= Trade union sponsorship of UK members of Parliament =

Trade union sponsorship of UK members of Parliament was a phenomenon whereby a union supported a member of the House of Commons with financial contributions.

== Background ==
Until 1996, all Labour parliamentary candidates had to have their candidatures supported by one of the organisations affiliated to the Labour Party, principally the constituency Labour Parties and trade unions. Those supported by the trade unions were conventionally referred to as "sponsored MPs" and, pejoratively, as "kept men", a phrase first used by the Conservative Walter Elliot. MPs were asked to declare their interests, and were not allowed to sign contracts which compelled them to achieve specific goals while in the Commons. However, many wished to speak on behalf of the union in debates and ask questions on topics of interest to the union, obtaining responses even when a union might be ignored. They could also keep unions informed of government or other public plans. If a union was unhappy with the position its sponsored MP took, it could speak out against them, or withdraw sponsorship. However, the sudden withdrawal of sponsorship was almost unknown; instead, an MP might be dropped at the next general election.

Throughout the history of sponsorship, the unions themselves made all decisions as to which candidates to support. Some held internal elections, at which members could select which candidates would receive sponsorship, while others allowed their executives to make a decision, usually on the back of interviews with prospective candidates. Some unions set tests for potential candidates.

Sponsored MPs tended to regard the Labour Party as the party of the trade unions, and resisted the efforts of some other MPs to break those links.

== Liberal-Labour MPs ==
Early sponsored MPs aligned themselves with the Radical section of the Liberal Party. The actual sponsorship in these years was not necessarily formal, the Lib-Lab MPs including some sponsored by local committees. There were also some Lib-Lab MPs who were only elected after they had ceased involvement in a trade union, such as Cremer or Hardie. However, sixty MPs between 1874 and 1910 had clear links. The Lib-Labs were broadly accepted in the Liberal Party, although slightly marginalised due to their lack of personal wealth; for example, Charles Fenwick was not invited to the Speakers' dinner in 1892 because he did not own formal clothes. Burns and Hardie emphasised their working class membership, and were considered more controversial. Some stood as Lib Labs up to 1918, including Burt, Brace, Kenyon, Galbraith and A. J. Bailey of the General Workers(?)

== The early Labour Party ==
Until 1911, Member of Parliament were not paid, and so workers could not afford to take up a seat in the Commons without sponsorship. Unions covered both electoral expenses and maintenance payments, to fund the living costs of an MP. Those Labour MPs who did not receive union sponsorship were instead paid from the Parliamentary Fund of the Labour Party, which was raised in part from unions. Even after salaries were introduced, they were low, and made it difficult for MPs to survive entirely on them, so the maintenance element endured for many years.

In the early years, they provided trade unions with access to Parliament, and many were senior union officials.

| Union | 1900 | | 1906 | | 1910 Jan | | 1910 Dec | |
| Union | Candidates | MPs | Candidates | MPs | Candidates | MPs | Candidates | MPs |
|---|---|---|---|---|---|---|---|---|
| ASC&J | 0 | 0 | 2 | 1 | 3 | 1 | 2 | 1 |
| ASE | 0 | 0 | 5 | 2 | 5 | 2 | 2 | 2 |
| ASLP | 0 | 0 | 1 | 1 | 0 | 0 | 0 | 0 |
| ASPD | 0 | 0 | 0 | 0 | 1 | 0 | 0 | 0 |
| ASRS | 1 | 1 | 3 | 2 | 3 | 3 | 3 | 3 |
| ASS | 1 | 0 | 2 | 2 | 2 | 1 | 1 | 1 |
| ASLEF | 0 | 0 | 1 | 0 | 0 | 0 | 0 | 0 |
| BSSA | 1 | 0 | 2 | 2 | 3 | 1 | 2 | 1 |
| DWR | 0 | 0 | 1 | 0 | 0 | 0 | 0 | 0 |
| FTU | 0 | 0 | 0 | 0 | 1 | 0 | 0 | 0 |
| FSIF | 0 | 0 | 1 | 1 | 1 | 1 | 1 | 1 |
| LSC | 0 | 0 | 1 | 1 | 1 | 1 | 1 | 1 |
| MFGB | 0 | 0 | 2 | 2 | 27 | 17 | 23 | 17 |
| NAFTA | 0 | 0 | 1 | 1 | 1 | 1 | 1 | 1 |
| NAUSAWC | 0 | 0 | 2 | 1 | 1 | 1 | 1 | 0 |
| NAC | 0 | 0 | 0 | 0 | 1 | 0 | 1 | 1 |
| NUB | 0 | 0 | 0 | 0 | 1 | 0 | 0 | 0 |
| NUBSO | 0 | 0 | 1 | 1 | 2 | 0 | 0 | 0 |
| NUDL | 0 | 0 | 1 | 0 | 1 | 0 | 0 | 0 |
| NUGW | 1 | 0 | 2 | 1 | 2 | 1 | 1 | 1 |
| NUT | 0 | 0 | 0 | 0 | 0 | 0 | 1 | 0 |
| OSM | 0 | 0 | 1 | 0 | 0 | 0 | 0 | 0 |
| Postmen | 0 | 0 | 1 | 0 | 1 | 0 | 0 | 0 |
| TA | 0 | 0 | 1 | 1 | 1 | 1 | 1 | 1 |
| UPA | 0 | 0 | 0 | 0 | 1 | 1 | 1 | 1 |
| USB | 0 | 0 | 2 | 0 | 0 | 0 | 0 | 0 |
| UTFWA | 0 | 0 | 2 | 2 | 2 | 2 | 3 | 2 |
| Trades councils | 1 | 0 | 3 | 1 | 0 | 0 | 0 | 0 |
| Total | 5 | 1 | 37 | 22 | 62 | 34 | 42 | 33 |

== Sponsorship of MPs from other parties ==
Although the large majority of trade unions sponsored MPs initially from the Liberal Party, and later from the Labour Party, a few tried to spread their sponsorship between different parties. James Mawdsley stood as a Conservative-Labour candidate in 1899, as did Fortescue Flannery of the Amalgamated Society of Engineers in 1906, but neither was elected.

From 1895 on, the National Union of Teachers sponsored candidates. It did not affiliate to any party, but attempted to balance the number of candidates between the Liberal, Labour and Conservative parties. From 1922 onwards, the majority of successful candidate were from the Labour Party, and although it continued to sponsor member of the other parties, it sometimes failed to interest candidates in standing for the other parties.

The Scottish Miners' Federation did not develop a relationship with the Liberal Party. It initially sponsored candidates from the Scottish United Trades Councils Labour Party, then the Independent Labour Party, followed by the Scottish Workers' Representation Committee. The Durham Colliery Mechanics' Association stood John Wilkinson Taylor in 1906 as an independent candidate, and Ebby Edwards was sponsored as an independent by the Northumberland Miners' Association in 1918. Of these, only Taylor was elected, and he later joined the Labour Party.

The National Farmers' Union sponsored a National Party candidate and five independents at the 1918 UK general election, none of whom were elected. At the 1922 election, it sponsored three independents and four Conservative party candidates, of whom only the Conservatives were elected, and it continued to sponsor Conservative candidates until 1935. However, the National Farmers' Union was not part of the trade union movement and the sponsored candidates did not have a similar status to sponsored MPs in the Labour Party.

The United Patternmakers' Association's general secretary, George Buchanan, remained with the Independent Labour Party after it split from the Labour Party in 1931, and it sponsored him in that election. By 1935, the union withdrew official sponsorship for him, but it set up a voluntary fund to back him to which members could choose to donate. He subsequently returned to the Labour Party.

== The Labour Party between the wars ==
Increasing responsibilities of both MPs and union leaders tended to prevent people from combining the two after World War I, although there were exceptions, principally in the National Union of General and Municipal Workers. Increasingly, sponsored MPs were retired officials, or those who had been defeated in elections but the union still wished to maintain. Even though some proved fairly ineffective as politicians, trade unions which sponsored them gained prestige in the movement. Trade unions often paid the large majority of expenses of their sponsored candidates, but their main influence lay in sending delegates to selection meetings to secure the adoption of their preferred candidate. They preferred to sponsor candidates in safe seats, and so the majority were successful in winning election.

Some MPs were not sponsored by their union. In the case of the Union of Post Office Workers, from 1927, the union was barred from affiliating to the Labour Party. Instead, its candidates were sponsored by a Direct Parliamentary Representation Society, with the same membership as the union. Some candidates sponsored by Divisional Labour Parties received small payments from the unions of which they held membership, such as Emmanuel Shinwell, or those backed by the National Union of Agricultural Workers. Other trade union members received no support at all from their union, such as F. W. Jowett.

The sponsorship of candidates and MPs in this period was not always clearly recorded until the 1929 UK general election. However, it is clear the large majority of trade union-sponsored candidates were in urban areas, with most of the remainder in coalfield seats. Following the Labour Party's landslide defeat in the 1931 UK general election, although a lower percentage of trade union candidates won their seats, they represented a record high proportion of the much smaller parliamentary party. During this period, only one trade union-sponsored MP was a woman: Ellen Wilkinson, of the National Union of Distributive and Allied Workers.

With the 1933 Hastings Agreement, for the first time, the Labour Party regulated trade union sponsorship, limiting the amount of election and organisational expenses, and costs of an agent, that unions could cover.

| Union | 1918 | | 1922 | | 1923 | | 1924 | | 1929 | | 1931 | | 1935 | |
| Union | Cand | MPs | Cand | MPs | Cand | MPs | Cand | MPs | Cand | MPs | Cand | MPs | Cand | MPs |
|---|---|---|---|---|---|---|---|---|---|---|---|---|---|---|
| ABFSWS | 0 | 0 | 0 | 0 | 0 | 0 | 0 | 0 | 1 | 0 | 0 | 0 | 0 | 0 |
| ASC&J/ASW | 5 | 1 | 6 | 1 | 6 | 3 | 6 | 2 | 6 | 6 | 5 | 1 | 4 | 2 |
| ASDFKT | 0 | 0 | 0 | 0 | 0 | 0 | 0 | 0 | 1 | 1 | 1 | 0 | 1 | 1 |
| ASE/AEU | 17 | 1 | 15 | 7 | | 7 | | 4 | 3 | 3 | 3 | 2 | 3 | 3 |
| ASLEF | 3 | 0 | 1 | 0 | 1 | 0 | 1 | 1 | 1 | 1 | 0 | 0 | 1 | 1 |
| ASPD | 0 | 0 | 0 | 0 | 0 | 0 | 0 | 0 | 1 | 0 | 1 | 0 | 1 | 0 |
| AUBTW | N/A | N/A | 0 | 0 | 0 | 0 | 0 | 0 | 0 | 0 | 1 | 0 | 1 | 0 |
| AUCE/NUDAW | | 0 | | 1 | 4 | 1 | | 4 | 6 | 4 | 5 | 1 | 9 | 5 |
| BFAWU | 0 | 0 | 1 | 0 | 0 | 0 | 0 | 0 | 0 | 0 | 0 | 0 | 1 | 1 |
| BISAKTA | 4 | 2 | 4 | 2 | 4 | 1 | 3 | 3 | 5 | 4 | 3 | 1 | 2 | 1 |
| CIOM&KTA | 1 | 0 | 1 | 1 | 1 | 1 | 1 | 0 | N/A | N/A | N/A | N/A | N/A | N/A |
| CMSA | 1 | 1 | 1 | 1 | 1 | 1 | 1 | 1 | 1 | 1 | 1 | 0 | 0 | 0 |
| FSIF/NUFW | 2 | 1 | 1 | 0 | 1 | 0 | 1 | 1 | 1 | 1 | 1 | 0 | 0 | 0 |
| LSC | 1 | 1 | 2 | 2 | 2 | 2 | 2 | 2 | 2 | 2 | 2 | 0 | 2 | 2 |
| MFGB | 51 | 25 | 52 | 41 | 47 | 43 | 47 | 40 | 42 | 42 | 43 | 26 | 38 | 32 |
| NAFTA | 2 | 1 | 0 | 0 | 1 | 1 | 1 | 0 | 1 | 1 | 0 | 0 | 0 | 0 |
| NAOP | 0 | 0 | 0 | 0 | 0 | 0 | 0 | 0 | 1 | 0 | 0 | 0 | 0 | 0 |
| NATSOPA | 1 | 0 | 1 | 0 | 1 | 1 | 1 | 0 | 1 | 1 | 1 | 0 | 1 | 0 |
| NAULAW | N/A | N/A | 0 | 0 | 0 | 0 | 0 | 0 | 0 | 0 | 1 | 0 | 0 | 0 |
| NSPW | 0 | 0 | 0 | 0 | 0 | 0 | 1 | 1 | 1 | 1 | 1 | 0 | 1 | 1 |
| NUAW | 2 | 0 | 3 | 0 | 2 | 1 | 2 | 0 | 3 | 0 | 4 | 0 | 0 | 0 |
| NUB | 1 | 0 | 1 | 0 | 1 | 1 | 1 | 0 | 1 | 0 | 0 | 0 | 0 | 0 |
| NUBSO | 1 | 1 | 4 | 2 | 3 | 1 | 2 | 0 | 5 | 2 | 5 | 0 | 3 | 0 |
| NUGW/NUGMW | 7 | 4 | | 4 | | 5 | 7 | 4 | 8 | 6 | 11 | 2 | 11 | 6 |
| NUR | 6 | 1 | 12 | 3 | 5 | 3 | 7 | 3 | 11 | 8 | 10 | 0 | 12 | 5 |
| NUS | 0 | 0 | 0 | 0 | 0 | 0 | 0 | 0 | 0 | 0 | 0 | 0 | 1 | 0 |
| NUTW | 0 | 0 | 1 | 1 | 1 | 0 | 1 | 1 | 1 | 0 | 1 | 0 | 1 | 0 |
| NUVB | 1 | 0 | 1 | 0 | 1 | 1 | 1 | 1 | 1 | 1 | 1 | 0 | 1 | 1 |
| OBDFA | 0 | 0 | 0 | 0 | 0 | 0 | 0 | 0 | 0 | 0 | 1 | 0 | 1 | 0 |
| PSU | 0 | 0 | 1 | 0 | 1 | 1 | 1 | 0 | 1 | 1 | 0 | 0 | 0 | 0 |
| RCA | 6 | 0 | 8 | 0 | 5 | 1 | 7 | 0 | 8 | 7 | 7 | 0 | 10 | 6 |
| TA | 1 | 1 | 2 | 1 | 1 | 1 | 1 | 1 | 1 | 1 | 1 | 0 | 2 | 1 |
| TGWU | N/A | N/A | | 7 | | 10 | | 10 | 17 | 13 | 16 | 1 | 11 | 7 |
| UPA | 0 | 0 | 1 | 1 | 1 | 1 | 1 | 1 | 1 | 1 | 2 | 1 | 1 | 1 |
| UPW | N/A | N/A | 6 | 2 | 6 | 3 | 6 | 2 | 6 | 6 | 5 | 0 | 3 | 0 |
| USB | 5 | 1 | 5 | 1 | 5 | 2 | 6 | 2 | 4 | 1 | 5 | 1 | 2 | 1 |
| UTFWA | 10 | 4 | 10 | 3 | 7 | 3 | 7 | 2 | 6 | 4 | 8 | 0 | 6 | 0 |
| WU | 2 | 0 | 6 | 2 | 6 | 2 | 6 | 5 | 6 | 6 | N/A | N/A | N/A | N/A |
| Other unions | 59 | 6 | | 8 | | 16 | | 8 | 0 | 4 | 0 | 0 | 0 | 3 |
| Total | 163 | 49 | 157 | 86 | 129 | 102 | 144 | 88 | 139 | 114 | 138 | 35 | 129 | 78 |

Others in 1918: Dockers: 4, Postmen: 4, Fawcett Assoc: 1, P&TCA: 4

== The Labour Party after World War II ==
The maintenance payments made by unions tended not to be increased, so by the 1950s, they formed a less significant portion of MP's income, and many unions phased them out. However, the payment of election and organisation expenses remained significant. By 1983, the GMB, AEU, NUM and NUR all paid the maximum amounts permitted under the revised Hastings agreement, but other unions, such as the TGWU and ASTMS, paid less than half of this.

Constituencies were more likely to select candidates with union sponsorship, but from the late 1950s, this effect weakened, as the local dominance of individual industries, such as mining, declined, and in many cases, unions were less likely to affiliate to constituency labour parties.

By the 1960s, unions increasingly saw the role as symbolic, and the sponsorship as a way of more broadly supporting the Labour Party, many sponsored MPs having little or no previous activity in the union. Sponsored MPs usually met with union officials, sometimes on a quarterly basis, but often felt that the relationship with their union suffered from poor communication and a lack of more regular contact. In some cases, MPs gave regular reports to a union's executive, conference or journal.

By the 1970s, manufacturing unions were in decline, and far more MPs were sponsored by white collar unions. The National Union of Mineworkers, in particular, saw a big decline in the number of MPs it sponsored, while the ASTMS, NUPE and TASS greatly increased their representation. The major general unions, the TGWU and GMB, also increased their representation, and the TGWU over took the NUM as the union sponsoring the most MPs.

| Union | 1945 | | 1950 | | 1951 | | 1955 | | 1959 | | 1964 | | 1966 | | 1970 | | 1974 Feb | | 1974 Oct | |
| Union | Cand | MPs | Cand | MPs | Cand | MPs | Cand | MPs | Cand | MPs | Cand | MPs | Cand | MPs | Cand | MPs | Cand | MPs | Cand | MPs |
|---|---|---|---|---|---|---|---|---|---|---|---|---|---|---|---|---|---|---|---|---|
| ACT | 0 | 0 | 0 | 0 | 1 | 0 | 0 | 0 | 0 | 0 | 0 | 0 | 0 | 0 | 0 | 0 | 0 | 0 | 0 | 0 |
| AESD/DATA/TASS | 0 | 0 | 2 | 0 | 2 | | 2 | 0 | 2 | 0 | 3 | 0 | 2 | 2 | 4 | 4 | 4 | 4 | 4 | 4 |
| AEU | 4 | 4 | 10 | 8 | 13 | 8 | 12 | 6 | 15 | 8 | 19 | 17 | 17 | 17 | 21 | 16 | 21 | 17 | 18 | 16 |
| ASLEF | 1 | 2 | 2 | 2 | 3 | 2 | 3 | 2 | 3 | 3 | 1 | 1 | 1 | 1 | 0 | 0 | 1 | 0 | 0 | 0 |
| ASSET/ASTMS | 0 | 0 | 0 | 0 | 0 | 0 | 0 | 0 | 0 | 0 | 1 | 1 | 2 | 2 | 4 | 3 | 14 | 9 | 13 | 12 |
| ASW | 4 | 3 | 3 | 3 | 3 | 3 | 2 | 2 | 2 | 1 | 1 | 0 | 1 | 1 | 1 | 2 | N/A | N/A | N/A | N/A |
| AUBTW/UCATT | 1 | 1 | 1 | 0 | 1 | 0 | 1 | 0 | 0 | 0 | 1 | 1 | 1 | 1 | 1 | 1 | 3 | 2 | 3 | 3 |
| BISAKTA | 2 | 2 | 2 | 2 | 2 | 2 | 2 | 2 | 2 | 2 | 1 | 1 | 1 | 1 | 2 | 2 | 3 | 2 | 2 | 2 |
| CAWU/APEX | 1 | 1 | 2 | 1 | 1 | | 2 | 1 | 2 | 1 | 3 | 1 | 4 | 4 | 3 | 3 | 6 | 6 | 6 | 6 |
| CEU | 0 | 0 | 0 | 0 | 0 | 0 | 0 | 0 | 0 | 0 | 1 | 1 | 1 | 1 | 1 | 1 | 1 | 1 | 1 | 1 |
| ETU/EETPU | 1 | 1 | 2 | 1 | 3 | 1 | 2 | 0 | 4 | 0 | 5 | 1 | 2 | 1 | 3 | 3 | 3 | 3 | 3 | 3 |
| FBU | 0 | 0 | 0 | 0 | 0 | 0 | 0 | 0 | 0 | 0 | 1 | 1 | 1 | 1 | 1 | 0 | 0 | 0 | 0 | 0 |
| LSC/NGA | 2 | 2 | 0 | 0 | 0 | 0 | 0 | 0 | 0 | 0 | 1 | 1 | 2 | 2 | 1 | 0 | 1 | 0 | 0 | 0 |
| MU | 0 | 0 | 0 | 0 | 0 | 0 | 0 | 0 | 0 | 0 | 1 | 1 | 1 | 1 | 2 | 1 | 1 | 0 | 1 | 0 |
| NATSOPA | 1 | 1 | 1 | 1 | 1 | | 1 | 1 | 0 | 0 | 0 | 0 | 0 | 0 | 0 | 0 | 0 | 0 | 0 | 0 |
| NAULAW | 1 | 1 | 1 | 1 | 0 | 0 | 0 | 0 | 0 | 0 | 0 | 0 | N/A | N/A | N/A | N/A | N/A | N/A | N/A | N/A |
| NUAW | 3 | 1 | 2 | 1 | 2 | 1 | 3 | 1 | 4 | 2 | 3 | 1 | 1 | 1 | 2 | 0 | 0 | 0 | 1 | 1 |
| NUB | 0 | 0 | 0 | 0 | 0 | 0 | 1 | 0 | 0 | 0 | 1 | 1 | 1 | 1 | 1 | 1 | 1 | 1 | 1 | 1 |
| NUBSO/NUFLAT | 4 | 4 | 2 | 1 | 1 | 1 | 0 | 0 | 0 | 0 | 0 | 0 | 1 | 0 | 0 | 0 | 1 | 0 | 0 | 0 |
| NUDAW/USDAW | 8 | 8 | 9 | 8 | 10 | 9 | 10 | 9 | 10 | 9 | 10 | 10 | 8 | 8 | 7 | 9 | 6 | 6 | 5 | 5 |
| NUDBTW | 0 | 0 | 0 | 0 | 0 | 0 | 1 | 0 | 0 | 0 | 0 | 0 | 0 | 0 | 0 | 0 | 0 | 0 | 0 | 0 |
| NUFTO/FTAT | 0 | 0 | 0 | 0 | 0 | | 0 | 0 | 0 | 0 | 2 | 0 | 0 | 0 | 1 | 1 | 2 | 1 | 2 | 1 |
| NUFW/AUFW | 0 | 0 | 1 | 0 | 1 | 0 | 0 | 0 | 0 | 0 | 0 | 0 | 0 | 0 | 0 | 0 | 0 | 0 | 0 | 0 |
| NUGMW | 10 | 10 | 10 | 6 | 7 | 6 | 4 | 4 | 6 | 4 | 9 | 9 | 10 | 10 | 12 | 12 | 13 | 13 | 13 | 13 |
| NUM | 34 | 34 | 37 | 37 | 37 | 36 | 35 | 34 | 31 | 31 | 29 | 28 | 28 | 27 | 21 | 20 | 21 | 18 | 20 | 18 |
| NUPE | 0 | 0 | 1 | 1 | 3 | | 2 | 2 | 2 | 1 | 2 | 2 | 5 | 5 | 6 | 6 | 7 | 6 | 7 | 6 |
| NUR | 13 | 12 | 12 | 10 | 10 | 9 | 11 | 8 | 9 | 5 | 7 | 6 | 8 | 7 | 6 | 5 | 7 | 6 | 6 | 6 |
| NUS | 0 | 0 | 1 | 0 | 0 | 0 | 0 | 0 | 1 | 0 | 0 | 0 | 1 | 0 | 1 | 1 | 2 | 1 | 1 | 1 |
| NUTGW | 0 | 0 | 0 | 0 | 0 | 0 | 0 | 0 | 1 | 1 | 0 | 0 | 0 | 0 | 0 | 0 | 0 | 0 | 0 | 0 |
| NUVB | 0 | 0 | 0 | 0 | 0 | 0 | 1 | 0 | 1 | 1 | 1 | 1 | 1 | 1 | 1 | 1 | N/A | N/A | N/A | N/A |
| POEU/NCU | 0 | 0 | 0 | 0 | 0 | 0 | 0 | 0 | 0 | 0 | 0 | 0 | 1 | 0 | 3 | 1 | 3 | 2 | 2 | 2 |
| SCMU | 0 | 0 | 0 | 0 | 0 | 0 | 0 | 0 | 0 | 0 | 0 | 0 | 0 | 0 | 1 | 0 | N/A | N/A | N/A | N/A |
| SUBAW | 0 | 0 | 1 | 0 | 0 | 0 | 0 | 0 | 0 | 0 | 0 | 0 | 0 | 0 | 0 | 0 | 0 | 0 | 0 | 0 |
| TA | 2 | 2 | 2 | 1 | 1 | 1 | 1 | 1 | 1 | 1 | 0 | 0 | 0 | 0 | 0 | 0 | 0 | 0 | 0 | 0 |
| TGWU | 18 | 17 | 19 | 16 | 17 | 14 | 16 | 14 | 19 | 14 | 23 | 21 | 27 | 27 | 23 | 19 | 23 | 23 | 23 | 21 |
| TSSA | 9 | 9 | 11 | 7 | 11 | 7 | 10 | 5 | 8 | 5 | 7 | 7 | 5 | 5 | 4 | 4 | 5 | 3 | 4 | 3 |
| TWU | 0 | 0 | 0 | 0 | 0 | 0 | 0 | 0 | 1 | 0 | 0 | 0 | 0 | 0 | 0 | 0 | 0 | 0 | 0 | 0 |
| UTFWA | 3 | 3 | 3 | 2 | 3 | 1 | 2 | 1 | 2 | 1 | 1 | 1 | 1 | 1 | 1 | 0 | 0 | 0 | 0 | 0 |
| UPA | 2 | 2 | 0 | 0 | 1 | | 1 | 1 | 1 | 1 | 1 | 1 | 0 | 0 | 0 | 0 | 1 | 0 | 0 | 0 |
| UPW | 1 | 1 | 3 | 1 | 4 | 2 | 2 | 1 | 2 | 2 | 3 | 2 | 4 | 4 | 3 | 1 | 5 | 2 | 4 | 2 |
| Total | 126 | 121 | 140 | 110 | 137 | 105 | 129 | 96 | 129 | 93 | 138 | 120 | 138 | 132 | 137 | 114 | 155 | 127 | 141 | 129 |

== End of the system ==
By the 1980s, many unions had moved from holding elections to identify candidates, to setting tests. Another trend was to co-opt existing MPs, with their agreement, who may have had no previous link with the union, but were willing to work with it in exchange for sponsorship. Most unions removed any requirement to have worked in the industry they represented, although the NUM and ASE continued to only sponsor candidates with trade experience. In some cases, such as that of Frank Dobson, this was deemed a success; he was the son of a railway worker and regularly spoke up on issues of interest to the National Union of Railwaymen. However, in other cases, such as that of the Confederation of Health Service Employees, many sponsored MPs had little connection with union and did little to represent its interests. Some MPs hoped to receive a front-bench portfolio and focus on that, rather than union matters.

Even where trade unions still sponsored members to stand for election, many introduced bans on salaried officials doing so, not wanting to lose their expertise. The Post Office Engineering Union took a different approach, and instead required John Golding to stand down as an MP on his election as general secretary of the union.

The NUR attempted to reform its relationship with its sponsored MPs in 1976, by appointing Keith Hill as Political Liaison Officer, based in Westminster, and focusing on communicating with, researching for, and giving Parliamentary Questions to, the MPs. This practice was copied first by the TGWU, which appointed Jenny Pardington as Parliamentary Liaison Assistant, and then Alan Meale of ASLEF, Roger Godsiff of APEX, Bill Gilby of NUPE, Angela Eagle of COHSE, and John Starmer of the NCU. The officers began working together through Trade Unionists for a Labour Victory, which broadened into the TUCC and then TUFL, campaigning for a stronger trade union role in political matters.

Despite these changes, the proportion of sponsored MPs rose through the 1980s, largely because of the smaller number of Labour MPs. By 1990, more than 60% of the party's MPs were sponsored. There was also a slow growth in the number of women who were sponsored, although their numbers remained small. Another major change was the proportion of the frontbench which was sponsored; by 1989, all but two Shadow Cabinet members were sponsored, and they were given limited assistance by the GMB. However, some unions felt that they were better off sponsoring backbenchers, as they would have more time to devote to union interests, and would be less sensitive to any press criticisms of union influence over their activities.

The system led to a poor distribution of resources, with most union funds supporting MPs in safe seats, who were least in need of the election and agent expenses. In addition, some unions became frustrated that they could not get candidates adopted in seats where they had traditionally sponsored the MP, and in some cases, struggled to get them adopted in any winnable seats.

The system for adopting candidates was changed in the 1980s, with an electoral college system created, giving affiliated unions a fixed but minority say in decisions. In 1990, it was changed again to a one member one vote system, despite the concerns of many unions that the party leadership was seeking to reduce their influence in the party.

The Committee on Standards in Public Life issued the Nolan Report in 1995, which expressed concerns that the sponsorship system could be abused. In response, the following year, the Labour Party abolished the system. Thereafter, trade unions were invited to sponsor constituencies, rather than MPs, enabling the party to direct funding to marginal seats, and reduce the ability of unions to put forward preferred candidates.

| Union | 1979 | | 1983 | | 1987 | | 1992 | |
| Union | Cand | MPs | Cand | MPs | Cand | MPs | Cand | MPs |
|---|---|---|---|---|---|---|---|---|
| AEU | 18 | 16 | 27 | 13 | 15 | 12 | 15 | 13 |
| APEX | 6 | 5 | 3 | 3 | 3 | 3 | N/A | N/A |
| ASLEF | 1 | 0 | 2 | 0 | 0 | 0 | 2 | 1 |
| ASTMS/MSF | 12 | 8 | 11 | 10 | 9 | 8 | 13 | 13 |
| BISAKTA | 2 | 2 | 3 | 1 | 3 | 1 | 1 | 0 |
| CEU | 1 | 1 | | | N/A | N/A | N/A | N/A |
| COHSE | 6 | 3 | 3 | 3 | 8 | 4 | 6 | 6 |
| ETU/EETPU | 4 | 4 | 7 | 3 | 3 | 3 | 10 | 3 |
| FBU | 0 | 0 | | | 1 | 1 | 0 | 0 |
| GMB | 14 | 14 | 14 | 11 | 12 | 11 | 22 | 17 |
| NACODS | 0 | 0 | 1 | 1 | 2 | 1 | 1 | 1 |
| NATSOPA/SOGAT | 0 | 0 | 2 | 2 | 2 | 2 | N/A | N/A |
| NCU | 4 | 3 | 3 | 3 | 2 | 2 | 4 | 3 |
| NGA/GPMU | 1 | 0 | 1 | 0 | 2 | 0 | 7 | 5 |
| NUAW | 1 | 1 | N/A | N/A | N/A | N/A | N/A | N/A |
| NUB | 1 | 1 | 1 | 1 | N/A | N/A | N/A | N/A |
| NUFLAT | 1 | 0 | | | 0 | 0 | N/A | N/A |
| NUFTO/FTAT | 1 | 1 | | | 0 | 0 | 0 | 0 |
| NUM | 18 | 16 | 14 | 14 | 13 | 13 | 14 | 14 |
| NUPE | 8 | 7 | 10 | 10 | 16 | 8 | 15 | 12 |
| NUR/RMT | 13 | 12 | 12 | 10 | 9 | 8 | 13 | 12 |
| NUS | 1 | 1 | 1 | 1 | 1 | 1 | N/A | N/A |
| NUSMWCHDE | 1 | 0 | | 0 | N/A | N/A | N/A | N/A |
| SLADE | 0 | 0 | 2 | 2 | N/A | N/A | N/A | N/A |
| TASS | 5 | 4 | N/A | 5 | 7 | 5 | N/A | N/A |
| TGWU | 29 | 20 | 30 | 26 | 44 | 33 | 44 | 38 |
| TSSA | 3 | 3 | 1 | 0 | 2 | 2 | 2 | 2 |
| UCATT | 4 | 2 | 2 | 1 | 1 | 1 | 0 | 0 |
| UPW | 2 | 2 | 1 | 1 | 1 | 1 | 1 | 0 |
| USDAW | 6 | 5 | 2 | 2 | 9 | 8 | 3 | 3 |
| USB | 2 | 2 | N/A | N/A | N/A | N/A | N/A | N/A |
| Other unions | 0 | 0 | 1 | 1 | 0 | 0 | 0 | 0 |
| Total | 159 | 132 | 153 | 114 | 146 | 130 | 199 | 157 |

== See also ==
- British MPs sponsored by mining unions
