= Tony Burke (British trade unionist) =

British trade union leader

Anthony Burke (born April 1952) is a British trade unionist. He was an official in print unions including the National Graphical Association (NGA) as Northern Regional Secretary, Graphical, Paper and Media Union (GPMU) as Deputy General Secretary, and Amicus as Assistant General Secretary. He retired in 2022 as an Assistant General Secretary of Unite the Union.

== Biography ==
A Mancunian and print worker, he joined the print union the NGA as an apprentice aged 17, became the Father of The Chapel (Senior Shop Steward) in print companies and newspapers where he worked as a printer and became president of the NGA's Stockport branch. In this role, he was at the forefront of disputes with newspaper owner Eddy Shah. A member of the National Council of the NGA and serving a term as vice president of the union, he was member of the NGA National Council during the Wapping dispute, . In 1991, the NGA merged with sister print union Sogat to form one union for printing, publishing, papermaking and media workers the GPMU.

In 1990 he was elected the NGA regional secretary in the north of England and in 1994, elected as deputy general secretary of the GPMU (the merged union of the NGA and the Society of Graphical and Allied Trades). He became known for his focus on organising workers, and was appointed as chair of the Trades Union Congress's (TUC) New Unionism Task Group.

With Frances O'Grady, who later became the General Secretary of the TUC, they developed the use of trained union organisers from different backgrounds from inside and outside of union movement to recruit and organise new members and workforces into the trade union movement.

Burke led negotiations with print, papermaking and packaging employers for the modernisation of national collective agreements, the use of new technologies, skills, retraining and apprenticeships.

In 2004, the GPMU merged into Amicus, and Burke was appointed as one of its assistant general secretaries, leading its Graphical, Paper and Media Sector. Amicus, in turn, became part of Unite, with Burke retaining his post as assistant general secretary, and taking responsibility for and coordinating and overseeing Unite's manufacturing sectors including autos, aerospace, shipbuilding, general and electrical engineering and manufacturing, steel, graphical, paper, media and IT, chemicals, pharma, textiles, rubber, glass and oil including offshore rigs and exploration and undertook international work within the union. .

Burke also represented the TUC on the board of the COGENT - the sector skills body for the Chemicals, Pharma, Life Sciences and Nuclear Industries and represented the Confederation of Shipbuilding and Engineering Unions (CSEU) on the board of Engenuity the sector skills body for the engineering, metals and manufacturing sectors.

Burke served on the General Council of the Trades Union Congress from 1993 until 2002, and again from 2008 to 2022. He also served on the TUC's Executive Committee, where he was the TUCs lead on employment and union rights. He represented Unite on the Labour Party's National Policy Forum. He was a vice president of IndustriALL Europe from 2019 - 2023, a founding member of the board of Workers Uniting the independent global trade union formed by Unite, the United Steelworkers in the USA and Canada and Los Mineros, the Mexican mining and metals trade union. He was the President of the CSEU.

With former National Officer of GPMU, Amicus and Unite Ann Field he co-wrote A Glorious History: Print and paper making trade union in the UK and Ireland. He also helped produce a biography of print trade unionist and activist Betty Tebbs, and with leading union shop stewards Unite's strategy for manufacturing in the UK and the case for remaining a member of the European Union.

Burke writes for the Morning Star and publishes on various websites with a focus on union organising, international trade unionism, employment and trade union rights, and trade agreements.

He is currently Co-chair of the Campaign for Trade Union Freedom, a board member of the People's Press Printing Society and is the trade union co-ordinator for the Morning Star. and is involved in the Palestine Solidarity Campaign, Labour & Palestine, trade union solidarity campaigns with Latin American counties, Media North, History & Policy Network, and the Labour Party currently serving as Trade Union officer in his Constituency Labour Party.

Trade union offices
Preceded by Brenda Dean	Deputy General Secretary of the Graphical, Paper and Media Union; 1994–2004	Succeeded by Union merged
Preceded by Jimmy Knapp	Chair of the Trades Union Councils' Joint Consultative Committee; 2001–c.2005	Succeeded by Jeremy Dear
Preceded by Ian Tonks	President of the Confederation of Shipbuilding and Engineering Unions; 2019–2022	Succeeded by Bob King
