= Bob Willis (trade unionist) =

British trade unionist

Robert Willis (27 February 1904 – 20 September 1982) was a British trade unionist.

Willis worked as a printer, then as a compositor with Reynolds News, and joined the London Society of Compositors in 1930. A member of the Communist Party of Great Britain in his youth, he left in the early 1930s, describing it as an "intellectual straitjacket". In 1938, he was elected as the Secretary of the London Trades Council, then in 1945, he became the general secretary of his union. He was elected to the General Council of the Trades Union Congress in 1947, serving until 1965, and became the President of the Trades Union Congress in 1959. From 1952, he also served as Chairman of the London Trades Council.

Under Willis' leadership, the London Society of Compositors merged with the Printing Machine Managers' Trade Society to form the "London Typographical Society". He became known as a strong speaker with forceful views. In 1964, Willis led the Compositors into a merger with the Typographical Association to form the National Graphical Association, of which he served as joint general secretary until 1969. He took a leave of absence from 1965 to 1967 to serve on the National Board for Prices and Incomes.

Trade union offices
Preceded by Alfred M. Wall	Secretary of the London Trades Council; 1938–1945	Succeeded by Julius Jacobs
Preceded by New position	Chairman of the London Trades Council (1952); 1953–1959	Succeeded by Jock Halliday
Preceded by Tom Yates	President of the Trades Union Congress; 1959	Succeeded by Claude Bartlett
Preceded by Alfred M. Wall	General Secretary of the London Society of Compositors; 1945–1964; With: Percy Astins (1955)	Succeeded by Position abolished
Preceded by E. W. Spackman	Printing and Paper Group representative on the General Council of the TUC; 1947 – 1965	Succeeded by Richard Briginshaw
Preceded by New position	General Secretary of the National Graphical Association; 1964–1969; With: John Bonfield	Succeeded by John Bonfield
