= NGA Dispute =

1983 industrial dispute involving the National Graphical Association in the UK

The NGA Dispute was a 1983 labour dispute between the print workers at the Warrington Messenger newspaper group in the north of England, all members of the National Graphical Association trade union, and Eddy Shah, the owner of the newspaper group.

== Background ==
Eddy Shah was an English businessman, most notable for his involvement in the newspaper industry. In the early 1980s, he owned the Warrington Messenger Group, comprising six local newspapers in the north of England. The printers of these newspapers were members of the National Graphical Association (NGA), a trade union that represented typographers in the United Kingdom.

In 1979, the Conservative Party led by Margaret Thatcher would win a majority in Parliament, and subsequently began to enact a series of laws restricting trade union rights in the UK. In the early 1980s, the Home Office and the Association of Chief Police Officers also created the classified Public Order Manual of Tactical Options and Related Matters, with the goal of implementing new tactics for handling public-order crimes and protests, as well as to build a closer collaboration between police and the Home Office.

== Dispute ==
On 4 July 1983, six Stockport Messenger workers walked off the job in protest against Shah's management. These six were Phil Daniels, Kevin Shervin, Stan Hart, John Noble, Neil McAllister, and Father of the Chapel Alan Royston. The outcry among the workers that followed afforded Shah the chance to break the closed shop arrangement of the Warrington Messenger Group, where all workers had to be a member of the union, in this case the NGA.

On 29 November, a picket line with 4000 workers was set up in front of the Stockport Messenger's printing plant. In response, 2000 police officers were mobilised to forcibly break up the picket line. For seven hours, the police charged the picket line and its attempts to regroup, while also seizing the NGA's loudspeakers, leading the strikers to throw stones and bricks back at the police. This clash would come to be known as the "Battle of Winwick Quay." Over 70 strikers were arrested by the police, and at least 34 injured. The police stated that 22 police offers had been injured. The picket line ultimately failed to prevent the 30 November edition of the Stockport Messenger from being printed and distributed.

Shah also sued the NGA over the strike. British courts would levy fines worth hundreds of thousands of pounds on the union.

In early December, the NGA announced plans for a national newspaper strike in solidarity with the Warrington Messenger Group strikers. The plans were then lent support by the economic committee of the Trades Union Congress (TUC). However, after TUC general secretary Len Murray criticised the committee's backing, the NGA temporarily suspended the plans until the TUC general council could hold a vote on them. On 14 December, the general council of the Trades Union Congress voted 29 to 21 against holding the national strike.

== Reactions ==
British Prime Minister Margaret Thatcher stated in the House of Commons that "employees at the Warrington Messenger Group have exercised their right by ballot to reject a closed shop" and that "this dispute is about the NGA attempting to intimidate them to make them, nevertheless, join a closed shop." Minister of State for the Arts Grey Gowrie condemned the strike as "indiscriminate and damaging" and claimed that the fundamental cause of the strike was "not in fact the future of the six dismissed strikers but the NGA's rigid insistence on a closed shop."

Director of the Newspaper Publishers' Association John LePage condemned the NGA's move for solidarity strikes as "flagrant breaches of contract against employers in no way remotely involved in the Stockport Messenger dispute," saying that the printing industry's "financial viability is in doubt." The Sunday Times editor in chief Andrew Neil secretly asked Home Secretary Leon Brittan to do more to repress the strike.

According to Paul Mason of the New Statesman, there was "genuine shock among the printers and their working class supporters at the brutality of the police response" and that the Battle of Winwick Quay "has since been recognised by academics as a turning point in UK public order."

== Aftermath ==
The militarised tactics used by the police in breaking up the strike would go on to be used with success by the British to break up further picket lines in the 1980s, most notably during the 1984–1985 United Kingdom miners' strike. The 1980s would also see another much larger industrial dispute in the printing industry: the 1986 Wapping dispute, which would fail like the NGA Dispute.
