= John Jackson (trade unionist) =

- Born: 12 January 1919; Camberwell, U.K.
- Died: 20 April 1995 (aged 76)
- Organizations: Society of Lithographic Artists, Designers and Engravers; National Graphical Association; Citizens Advice Bureau
- Military career
- Branch: British Army
- Service years: 1940–1946

John Jackson (12 January 1919 – 20 April 1995) was a British trade unionist, who became the leader of one of the country's print unions.

Born in Camberwell, Jackson completed an apprenticeship as a printer on metal, with the Amalgamated Press. He joined the Society of Lithographic Artists, Designers, Engravers and Process Workers (SLADE) when he was seventeen, and devoted much of his time to the union.

In 1940, Jackson joined the British Army, becoming a gunner, and at one point was the youngest Regimental Sergeant Major in the Army. He was demobbed in 1946, and returned to printing, and to SLADE.

Jackson was elected as general secretary of SLADE in 1972, taking over a union with booming membership, but which he believed was threatened by technological change. Rather than attempting to resist the changes, he tried recruiting members in new areas, but ran into controversy as the union was accused of creating closed shops in businesses where workers would have preferred to join a different union. He changed direction, and opened merger negotiations with several other unions, including the National Union of Journalists, but ultimately merged it into the National Graphical Association (NGA).

Following the merger, the NGA renamed itself as the "National Graphical Association '82", and appointed Jackson as joint general secretary. The next couple of years were difficult, leading up to the Wapping dispute, but Jackson retired in 1984, before it played out. In retirement, he volunteered for the Citizens Advice Bureau, and the Family Court in Bedford.

Trade union offices
Preceded by Len Knapp	General Secretary of the Society of Lithographic Artists, Designers, Engravers and Process Workers; 1972–1982	Succeeded by Position abolished
Preceded by Joe Wade	General Secretary of the National Graphical Association; 1982–1984; With: Joe Wade (1982–1984)	Succeeded by Tony Dubbins
