= Printing Machine Managers' Trade Society =

Former trade union of the United Kingdom

The Printing Machine Managers' Trade Society (PMMTS) was a trade union representing supervisors of machinery in the printing trade.

The union was founded in 1839 as the London Printing Machine Managers' Trade Society. Steam-powered printing machines were being gradually introduced to the trade, and its members differentiated themselves from the compositors who held membership of existing societies. By the 1880s, the London Society of Compositors and the Typographical Association also tried to recruit machine managers, and because of the conflict, the society did not initially join the Printing and Kindred Trades Federation. Instead, the union removed "London" from its name, and attempted to organise nationally.

The union focused on matters directly relating to the industry, and did not pay benefits to members who were out of work. To cover this, it set up a related organisation, the "Machine Managers' Benefit Society".

The union grew steadily for many years, membership reaching 1,525 in 1892, and about 4,500 in 1925. It generally voted against mergers with other unions, rejecting an amalgamation with the Platen Printing Machine Minders' Society or the National Society of Operative Printers and Assistants in 1912, but the London United Society of Plate Printers did join in 1919. It finally agreed a working arrangement with the London Society of Compositors in 1953, and merged into that union two years later.

== General secretaries ==
1860s: John Shreeve
c.1890: Daniel David Leahy
1890s: W. Bowns
1895: J. Dewar
1901: Henry Wilson Howes
1935: F. J. Kitts
1945: Percy Astins
