= Bonfield =

Bonfield may refer to:

- Bonfield, Illinois
- Bonfield, Ontario
- Bonfield (surname)
