= Bonfield (surname) =

Bonfield is a surname. Notable people with the surname include:

- Dawn Bonfield, British materials engineer
- George Robert Bonfield (1802–1898), English-born American sketcher and painter
- James Bonfield (1825–1883), Canadian politician
- John Bonfield (1915–1976), British trade unionist
- Peter Bonfield (born 1944), British business executive
- William Bonfield (born 1937), British material scientist
