= Richard Briginshaw, Baron Briginshaw =

British politician and trade unionist

The Right Honourable The Lord Briginshaw

Personal details
- Born: Richard William Briginshaw; 15 May 1908 Brixton, London, England
- Died: 26 March 1992 (aged 83) Croydon, London, England
- Occupation: Trade union leader

Richard William Briginshaw, Baron Briginshaw (15 May 1908 – 26 March 1992) was a British trade union leader and politician.

Born in Brixton, South London to a working-class family, Briginshaw left school at the age of fourteen to become a printer's devil. While his own family was relatively well off, he was exposed to the poverty of Brixton at the time, and his experiences of knowing children at school without shoes, and often without food, was to colour his political views for the rest of his life.

During his early career, Briginshaw worked as a machine hand for many different newspapers, but also attended night school, studying law and economics and eventually gaining a diploma from University College London. He also became active in the trade union movement, and in 1938 became Assistant secretary of the London branch of the National Society of Operative Printers and Assistants (NATSOPA). However, he was dismissed from his union post because of his communist leanings - he was a member of the Communist Party of Great Britain and an organiser for the Printers' Anti-Fascist Movement, which the union's leadership regarded as a communist front.

After the outbreak of the Second World War, Briginshaw joined the Army in 1941 and served in India, the Middle East and Western Europe. He impressed his superiors and was offered a commission, but turned it down, preferring to remain an ordinary soldier.

Following the end of the war, Briginshaw left the communist movement and joined the Labour Party. While he was firmly on the left of the party, he now enjoyed a rapid rise in his trade union, and in 1951 he became General Secretary of NATSOPA; a post he would hold for the next twenty-three years.

As a trade union leader, Briginshaw was seen as an uncompromising negotiator and a strong advocate for his members. He was also a fierce opponent of the incomes policies which both Labour and Conservative governments sought to introduce. However, he also foresaw the changes in printing technology which would eventually transform the newspaper industry and weaken the trade unions. To counter this he pushed for the industry's fragmented trade unions to amalgamate into one large union with mixed success; he merged his trade union with the National Union of Printing, Bookbinding and Paper Workers in 1966 to form the Society of Graphical and Allied Trades, but the two sections split shortly afterwards and were not reunited until after his retirement. His political alliances were often controversial; when the Conservative-supporting Rupert Murdoch and the Labour-supporting Robert Maxwell were vying for control of The Sun newspaper, he angered other union leaders by supporting Murdoch, who he believed would deliver better wages and job security for his members. He was a strong opponent of Britain's membership of the European Economic Community, denouncing the day Britain joined as "the blackest day in the calendar of [its] history"

After his retirement in 1973, Briginshaw surprised many observers by accepting a life peerage from Harold Wilson, joining the House of Lords and taking the title Baron Briginshaw, of Southwark in Greater London, in January 1975. The following year he published a pamphlet called Abolish the House of Lords, denouncing it as "a worthless anachronism". He died in 1992 in Croydon of a perforated duodenal ulcer and was survived by six children.

Trade union offices
Preceded by Harry Good	General Secretary of NATSOPA; 1951–1975	Succeeded by Owen O'Brien
Preceded by Robert Willis	Printing and Paper Group representative on the General Council of the TUC; 1965 – 1975	Succeeded by Bill Keys
