= NUPT =

NUPT can stand for:

- Nanjing University of Posts and Telecommunications, Chinese university
- National Union of Press Telegraphists, former British trade union
