= Joe Wade (trade unionist) =

British trade union leader

Joseph Frederick Wade (18 December 1919 – 5 October 2004) was a British trade union leader.

Born in Blackburn in Lancashire, Wade trained as a compositor with the Blackburn Times until 1940, then during World War II served with the East Lancashire Regiment and the Royal Army Ordnance Corps.

Wade returned to compositing in 1946, and became active in the Labour Party, for which he served on Blackburn County Borough Council from 1952 until 1956. He also joined the Typographical Association, becoming a full-time union official in 1956. The Typographical Association became part of the National Graphical Association (NGA) in 1964, and Wade became its first National Officer. In 1968, he was promoted to become Assistant General Secretary, and in 1976 he won election as General Secretary.

As leader of the union, Wade promoted the introduction of new technologies in a gradual manner, to give time to retrain staff and ensure any redundancies were voluntary. He agreed mergers with a number of smaller unions which led the union to become NGA'82, and was elected to the General Council of the Trades Union Congress in 1983. He retired in 1984, but served as a visiting professor at the University of Strathclyde from 1985 until 1988.

Trade union offices
Preceded by John Bonfield	General Secretary of the National Graphical Association; 1976–1984; With: John Jackson (1982–1984)	Succeeded by Tony Dubbins
