= Tony Dubbins =

British trade unionist

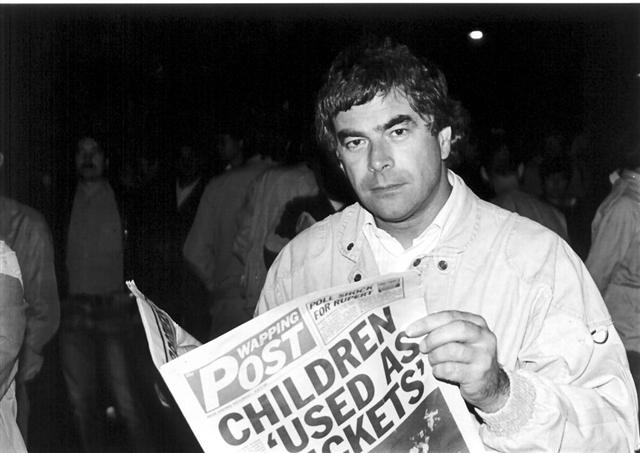

Personal details
- Party: Labour
- Occupation: Trade unionist

Tony Dubbins was a prominent British trade unionist until his retirement from Unite in 2008.

He first became a full-time union official in the National Graphical Association and became general secretary in 1984, leading the union through the Wapping dispute.

The NGA merged with the Society of Graphical and Allied Trades in 1990. Dubbins won the subsequent election against Brenda Dean, SOGAT's General Secretary, to become the first, and only, general secretary of the Graphical, Paper and Media Union.

Following the GPMU's merger with Amicus in 2004, he became Deputy General Secretary. Amicus then merged with the Transport & General Workers Union in May 2007 to form Unite.

He was president of the Trades Union Congress in 1997.

Between 2003 and 2008 he was chairman of the Trade Union and Labour Party Liaison Organisation. During this period he delivered the groundbreaking Warwick Agreement, ensuring every employee was entitled to 20 days paid holiday and maternity leave was increased to nine months. He led the campaign to ensure employment rights for Agency and Temporary Workers.

Trade union offices
Preceded by John Jackson and Joe Wade	General Secretary of National Graphical Association; 1984–1991	Succeeded by Position abolished
Preceded by New position	General Secretary of Graphical, Paper and Media Union; 1991–2005	Succeeded by Position abolished
Preceded by Lucy Anderson and Ed Sweeney	Deputy General Secretary of Amicus; 2005–2007; With: Ed Sweeney (2005 – 2007); Graham Goddard (2006 – 2007)	Succeeded by Position abolished
Preceded by Margaret Prosser	President of the Trades Union Congress; 1997	Succeeded by John Edmonds
