= NFIW =

NFIW may stand for:

- National Federation of Indian Women, women's organisation in India
- National Federation of Insurance Workers, a former British trade union federation
