= Percy Astins =

British trade unionist and politician (1888–1963)

Percy Astins (22 February 1888 – 1 March 1963) was a British trade unionist and politician.

Astins became active in the London United Society of Plate Printers, and served as its final general secretary. In 1919, he took the union into a merger with the Printing Machine Managers' Trade Society, and began working part-time as an official for the larger union. He was also active in the Labour Party, standing unsuccessfully in Bury St Edmunds at the 1929 United Kingdom general election, and in Ilford at the 1931 and 1935 United Kingdom general elections. He did succeed in winning election to Essex County Council, spending several years as the council's chairman.

In 1945, Astins became the full-time general secretary of the Printing Machine Managers' Trade Society. Ten years later, he took the union into a merger with the London Society of Compositors. That union was renamed as the "London Typographical Society", and Astins served as its joint general secretary for a year before he retired.

In retirement, Astins continued to serve as an alderman on Essex County Council, and was also chair of the governors of Essex Technical College, and a magistrate.

In 1947, Astins was made a Commander of the Order of the British Empire.

Trade union offices
Preceded by G. E. Barnard	General Secretary of the London United Society of Plate Printers; 1919	Succeeded by Position abolished
Preceded by F. J. Kitts	General Secretary of the Printing Machine Managers' Trade Society; 1945–1955	Succeeded by Position abolished
Preceded by Robert Willis	General Secretary of the London Typographical Society; 1955; With: Robert Willis	Succeeded by Robert Willis
Civic offices
Preceded by Gilbertson Smith	Chair of Essex County Council; 1946–1948	Succeeded by Joseph Hewett
Preceded by Joseph Hewett	Chair of Essex County Council; 1948–1949	Succeeded by Frank Savin Foster
