= Association of Correctors of the Press =

Former trade union of the United Kingdom

- Merged into: National Graphical Association
- Founded: 1854
- Dissolved: 1965
- Headquarters: 1 Gough Square, London
- Location: United Kingdom
- Members: 1,535 (1938)
- Affiliations: TUC, Labour

The Association of Correctors of the Press (ACP) was a longstanding trade union representing proofreaders in the United Kingdom.

The union was founded in 1854 as the London Association of Correctors of the Press. At first a very small organisation, it grew gradually to 174 members in 1884, and 483 in 1898. By 1903, it was able to appoint a full-time general secretary, and selected S. F. Crampin. The union dropped "London" from its name in 1905, and registered with the government in 1907. It continued to grow, peaking at 1,500 members by the late 1920s.

The union long had demarcation disputes with the London Society of Compositors (LSC); the ACP argued that proofreading was a profession which required the completion of an apprenticeship and the passing of examinations which it set, while the LSC believed that proofreading was a skill which compositors could learn through informal experience. As a result, while the ACP was recognised in the majority of newspaper offices in London, a large minority recognised only the LSC.

In both 1912 and 1924, the ACP organised a merger with the LSC, but on both occasions this was voted down by the ACP's members. Only in 1952 did the unions finally reach a formal agreement on their jurisdictions. In 1965, the ACP merged into the National Graphical Association.

== General Secretaries ==
1854: J. M. Philp
1855: R. S. Maurice
1862: J. E. Pincott
1867: J. H. Murray
1867: George Chaloner
1873: A. F. Whittaker
1890: G. Wilbrahim
1896: John Randall
1903: S. F. Crampin
1931: H. S. Temple
1947: C. W. Wallace
1964: Owen McCarthy
