= Lloyd Turner (journalist) =

British journalist (1938–1996)

- Born: 2 October 1938; Australia
- Died: 12 September 1996 (aged 57); London, England
- Occupations: Journalist; farmer
- Employer(s): Newcastle Morning Herald; Manchester Evening News; Daily Express; Daily Star; Today; The Post
- Known for: Newspaper editor
- Spouse: Jill Turner (m. 1973)

Lloyd Turner (2 October 1938 – 12 September 1996) was a newspaper editor in the United Kingdom.

Born in Australia, Turner worked on the Newcastle Morning Herald before moving to England to work as a journalist at the Manchester Evening News. He subsequently relocated to London to work on the Daily Express, where he became father of the chapel of the newspaper's National Union of Journalists. During this period, he founded the 84 Club, a drinking club, with Peter Tory.

After working for many years as chief sub editor of the Express, Turner was appointed editor of its stablemate, the Daily Star. He increased its sales, at the expense of the Daily Mirror, but was sacked in 1987 after a lawsuit against the newspaper's publisher found that the publication had libelled Jeffrey Archer, for claiming that he had had sex with prostitute Monica Coghlan. Archer was awarded a then-record £500,000 in damages but, in 2001, Archer was convicted of perjury and perverting the course of justice at the 1987 trial, and was imprisoned. Out of journalism, Turner bought a farm and began rearing bulls.

He was brought back in November 1988 as editor of the short-lived newspaper The Post until the paper closed five weeks later.

Returning to farming, Turner came back one more time to the national newspaper Today, serving as an assistant editor until the paper closed down in 1995. He worked as an advisor to the National Farmers' Union of England and Wales on Bovine spongiform encephalopathy until his death, at which time he was planning to again return to an editorial post, this time on the Daily Mail.

Media offices
Preceded by Derek Jameson	Editor of the Daily Star; 1980–1987	Succeeded by Michael Gabbert
