= National Union of Insurance Workers =

Former trade union of the United Kingdom

The National Union of Insurance Workers (NUIW) was a trade union representing workers in the insurance industry in the United Kingdom.

The union was formed in 1964, when the National Amalgamated Union of Life Insurance Workers merged with the National Federation of Insurance Workers. Initially, the union operated as a federation, with affiliates representing workers at larger individual companies, and a Composite Section for workers at smaller companies. Several of these sections left in the 1970s to join the Association of Scientific, Technical and Managerial Staffs. Three sections remained, representing workers at the Prudential, Liverpool Victoria and the Royal London, and these merged into the central union in 1984.

The union's membership fell over the years, from 25,740 in 1974, to only 12,519 in 1993. In 2000, it merged into the Manufacturing, Science and Finance trade union.

== Affiliates ==
- Britannic Field Staff Association
- Liverpool Victoria Workers' Union
- London and Manchester Field Staff Association
- National Pearl Federation
- National Union of Pearl Agents
- Prudential Staff Union
- Refuge Field Staff Association
- Royal Liver Employees' Union
- Royal London Staff Association

== Leadership ==
=== General Secretaries ===
1964: Terry Quinlan
1974: Fred Jarvis
1980: James Patrick Brown
1988: R. Main
1993: Ken Perry

=== Presidents ===
1965: Ernest Lorenz
1983: Fred S. Perry
