= Owen O'Brien =

British trade union leader (1920–1987)

Owen O'Brien (22 June 1920 – 2 November 1987) was a British trade union leader.

Born in Stepney, in the East End of London, O'Brien started work in the printing industry when he was fourteen years old. He completed an apprenticeship, during which period he was active in anti-fascist activity, taking part in the Battle of Cable Street.

O'Brien served in the Merchant Navy and was on board the Rangatiki in the Jervis bay incident then the Royal Air Force during World War II. After the war, he returned to printing, becoming active in the Labour Party and his union, the National Society of Operative Printers' Assistants (NATSOPA). In 1952, he was elected as secretary of the union's London Machine Branch, and then as secretary of the union's London Joint Branches group. He was elected as the union's assistant general secretary in 1964, and that year also became a governor of the London College of Printing, later chairing the organisation.

In 1975, O'Brien was elected as general secretary of NATSOPA. He was succeeded as assistant general secretary by his brother, Edward. His time in office was marked by rapid change in the industry, with much industrial action taking place, including a major strike at The Times. O'Brien opposed such strikes, and focused on negotiated settlements of disputes. The Times later wrote that "...of all the print union leaders he was the most ready to discuss options for co-operation with employers".

O'Brien supported the merger of the various print unions. In 1976, NATSOPA passed a motion to this effect, and O'Brien forged a close working relationship with Bill Keys of the Society of Graphical and Allied Trades (SOGAT). In 1982, NATSOPA merged with SOGAT, forming SOGAT '82; O'Brien and Keys served as joint general secretaries of the new union until O'Brien retired at the end of 1983. O'Brien died while on holiday in Portugal, four years later.

Trade union offices
| Preceded by J. T. Allen | Assistant General Secretary of the National Society of Operative Printers' Assistants; 1964–1975 | Succeeded by Edward O'Brien |
| Preceded by Richard Briginshaw | General Secretary of the National Society of Operative Printers and Media Personnel; 1975–1982 | Succeeded by Position abolished |
| Preceded by Bill Keys | General Secretary of the Society of Graphical and Allied Trades 1982; 1982–1984; With: Bill Keys | Succeeded by Brenda Dean |
