= Bill Keys (trade unionist) =

British trade union leader

William Herbert Keys (1 January 1923 – 19 May 1990) was a British trade union leader.

Keys grew up in south London, and served in the British Army during World War II. After being demobbed, he joined the National Union of Printing, Bookbinding and Paper Workers (NUPBPW), serving as its National Organiser from 1953 to 1960.

In 1960, Keys became the London Secretary of the NUPBPW, remaining in the role when it became part of the Society of Graphical and Allied Trades. In 1970, he was promoted to become General President of the union, then in 1974 he was elected as General Secretary. That year, he was also elected to the General Council of the Trades Union Congress.

Keys served on numerous committees, including those of the Central Arbitration Committee, the Commission for Racial Equality, the Institute of Manpower Studies and the European Social Fund.

Keys retired in 1985, and died five years later.

Trade union offices
| Preceded by Vincent Flynn | General President of the Society of Graphical and Allied Trades; 1970 – 1974 | Succeeded by Albert Powell |
| Preceded by Vincent Flynn | General Secretary of the Society of Graphical and Allied Trades; 1974 – 1985; With: Owen O'Brien (1982 – 1983) | Succeeded by Brenda Dean |
| Preceded by Richard Briginshaw | Printing and Paper Group representative on the General Council of the TUC; 1975 – 1983 | Succeeded by Council reorganised |
