= Eddy Shah =

British businessman (1944–2025)

- Born: Selim Jehan Shah; 20 January 1944; Cambridge, England
- Died: 29 December 2025 (aged 81)
- Other name: Eddie Shah
- Occupations: Businessman, Publisher, Author
- Known for: Messenger Group (Today, The Post)
- Notable work: The Lucy Ghosts; Ring of Red Roses; Manchester Blue; Fallen Angels; Second World
- Spouse(s): Jennifer White Shah (m. circa 1968; died 2023)
- Children: 3

Selim Jehan Shah (20 January 1944 – 29 December 2025), commonly known as Eddy Shah or Eddie Shah, was a British businessman based in Manchester who was the founder of the then technologically advanced UK newspaper Today in 1986, and of the short-lived tabloid The Post. He was also the owner of the Messenger Group.

== Life and career ==
=== Early life and education ===
Eddy Shah was born in Cambridge. His mother was English and his father was Iranian. Shah was educated at Karachi Grammar School, the Scottish co-educational independent boarding school of Gordonstoun, and at both Haywards Heath Grammar School and Haywards Heath Secondary Modern School, at Haywards Heath in Sussex. He then attended a Brighton cram school, where he obtained seven GCE 'O' Levels.

=== Television ===
Shah held various jobs, amongst which was floor manager for Granada's television studio. One show he worked on was Coronation Street. He was an uncredited floor assistant on the Doctor Who serials The Smugglers, The Tenth Planet, and The Power of the Daleks between 1966 and 1967.

=== Publisher ===
After he was fired from the Manchester Evening News in 1976, he decided to launch into newspaper publishing on his own and started with the proceeds of £14,000 from the sale of his first home, in Sale, which he had bought for £4,000.

As the owner of six local newspapers, Shah employed anti-trade union laws introduced by the Margaret Thatcher governments to defeat the print unions after national strikes that went on for seven months, despite receiving death threats. The Wapping dispute followed three years later.

Shah first confronted the trade unions in July 1983 at his Warrington print works and the Manchester news offices as the owner of the Warrington Messenger, he sacked six workers when they went on strike. They had been ordered to strike by the NGA in protest against the employment of non-union members, Shah believed this to be an illegitimate reason after recent laws passed by the Thatcher government. In response, the National Graphical Association (NGA) began mass picketing of the Messenger's offices.

On 29 November the courts sequestered the NGAs bank accounts to force payment, and kept them frozen as long as the NGA continued illegal action. When other newspapers reported on picketers charged with violence, the NGA shut down those newspapers too. In November, 1983, over four thousand trade unionists attended a mass picket. The police brought in riot-trained Police Support Units from five surrounding areas and the confrontation became physical. Baton charges were used to clear the road and allow newspaper deliveries to leave. Bottles and bricks were thrown at police, 23 police and 13 picketers were injured, 86 picketers were arrested, one of whom had a replica pistol. In January 1985 the NGA agreed to abide by the court orders, and removed support for the picket. The strike ended entirely in May.

In 1986 he launched Today, selling it in 1987 to Tiny Rowland's conglomerate Lonrho. He then launched The Post, which ran five weeks before shutting down. Shah sold his newspapers in 1988 and set up an independent TV company.

=== Author ===
Shah was the author of several novels, including The Lucy Ghosts (Doubleday, 1991), Ring of Red Roses (Corgi, Doubleday, 1992), Manchester Blue (Corgi, 1993), and Fallen Angels (Doubleday, 1994). After a break from writing, he returned in 2008 with a thriller entitled Second World (Pan Books).

=== Later business activities ===
Shah later owned and ran golf courses, leisure centres and hotels, including the Wiltshire Golf and Country Club, Royal Wootton Bassett. He built 44 holiday homes near his Wiltshire Hotel and Golf Club, but later sold it in or around 2013/14.

== Personal life and death ==
Shah was married to the late actress Jennifer White Shah, whom he first met while he was working for Granada Television. The company was producing The Caesars (1968) and Jennifer White was an actress playing Caligula's sister in the series. They had three children, and lived in Chippenham.

Shah died on 29 December 2025, at the age of 81. His death went unreported until 6 February 2026.

== Controversies ==
In October 2012, he was charged with child sex offences allegedly committed in the 1990s. In December 2012, he denied six counts of rape involving a girl under 16. The trial started at the Old Bailey on Tuesday 7 May 2013. On 12 July he was found not guilty.

In August 2013, he said that girls who throw themselves at celebrities or who "go out and just have a good time" could themselves be to blame. In such cases, charges involving girls under the age of consent could just be a technicality. His comments drew strong criticism from the National Association of People Abused in Childhood, who said that rape was always a crime and the law was configured on the assumption that adults would want to protect children. Shah's comments came directly after a prosecuting barrister was suspended following "inappropriate comments" concerning the rape of a 13-year-old.
