= Herbert Skinner (trade unionist) =

British trade unionist

John Herbert Sebastian Skinner (5 September 1861 – 2 June 1934) was a British trade unionist.

Skinner was born in Tiverton in Devon. He was living with a 27-year-old aunt prior to his 10th birthday. He worked as a compositor and moved to Kingston-upon-Hull to work at a newspaper there. He became involved with the Typographical Association, and in 1894 became its full-time National Organiser. From this post, he was promoted to Assistant General Secretary, then in 1900 was elected as its General Secretary.

During his time as General Secretary, Skinner devoted much effort to building links with other unions. He represented the Typographical Association to the Trades Union Congress (TUC), serving for a time on the General Council of the TUC, and in 1908 being chosen as its delegate to the American Federation of Labour. He also served on the Joint Industrial Council and Printing and Kindred Trades Federation.

Skinner resigned from his trade union posts around the start of 1933, due to poor health, and died 18 months later in Manchester.

Trade union offices
Preceded by A. Jones	General Secretary of the Typographical Association; 1900 – 1933	Succeeded by John Fletcher
Preceded by John Hodge and David Shackleton	Trades Union Congress representative to the American Federation of Labour; 1908; With: John Wadsworth	Succeeded by J. R. Clynes and Alfred Henry Gill
Preceded by New position	Printing and Paper Group member of the General Council of the Trades Union Congress; 1921 – 1933	Succeeded by George Isaacs
