= The Post (British newspaper) =

- Type: Daily newspaper
- Format: Tabloid
- Owner: Messenger Group
- Publisher: Eddy Shah
- Editor: Lloyd Turner
- Founded: 10 November 1988
- Ceased publication: December 1988
- Headquarters: Warrington, Cheshire

The Post was a national tabloid newspaper in the United Kingdom, owned by Eddy Shah's Messenger Group. It ran for only five weeks in November and December 1988. As the first national newspaper to be both conceived and composed by journalists, The Post dedicated itself to being sensationalism-free, a bit of a departure for British tabloids of that period. During its short life The Post had the most advanced production techniques devised (which were project-managed and implemented by Bryan Dean and Graham Binns). The paper never found a consistent editorial voice or audience, and folded due to financial pressures just five weeks after starting up.

== Publication history ==
Publisher Eddy Shah had been forced to sell his previous venture, Today, in 1986, and was determined to start another paper. The Post was produced at Messenger Newspapers, Warrington, UK, using Apple Macintosh IIfx computers and NewsWrite software, from Talbot Publishing Systems Limited, giving it a "what you see is what you get" (WYSIWYG) page design. In addition, pages were transmitted by phone line to the print shop, which gave the paper extra lead time due to a lack of need for courier services.

The first edition of The Post was issued on Thursday 10 November and cost 20p. The paper's final edition came out the week of 11 December 1988.

== Contributors and staff members ==
Lloyd Turner, former editor of the Daily Star, was The Post's editor.

Ian St John and Jimmy Greaves, then the hosts of an ITV football series called Saint and Greavsie, had a column in the paper on Saturdays.

Graham Ball was features editor at The Post newspaper; Rebekah Brooks was a staff member.

Cartoonist Steve McGarry's Western comic strip, Badlands, debuted in The Post; after the paper's closure Badlands ran for 13 years in The Sun.
