= Brenda Dean =

British trade unionist and Labour Party politician

The Right Honourable The Baroness Dean of Thornton-le-Fylde PC FRSA
- Dean in the House of Lords (December 2017)

Member of the House of Lords
- Lord Temporal
- Life peerage 12 October 1993 – 13 March 2018

Personal details
- Born: 29 April 1943 Salford, England
- Died: 13 March 2018 (aged 74) Nottingham, England
- Party: Labour
- Spouse: Keith McDowall CBE
- Occupation: Peer; Trade unionist

Brenda Dean, Baroness Dean of Thornton-le-Fylde, PC, FRSA (29 April 1943 – 13 March 2018) was a British trade unionist and Labour Party politician. As general secretary of SOGAT from 1985 until 1991, she was "the first woman elected to head a major industrial trade union."

== Early life ==
She was born in Salford; her father was a railway signalman and her mother worked in a carpet factory. When she was a child the family moved to Eccles, and she attended Stretford High School for Girls.

== Trade union career ==
She began her career as a trade unionist as a teenager, initially as a member of the National Union of Printing, Bookbinding and Paper Workers. In 1972 she became assistant secretary of the Manchester branch of the print union SOGAT (Society of Graphical and Allied Trades), and became involved in negotiations over the introduction of new technology to the printing industry. Rising through the union hierarchy, she became President of SOGAT in 1983, and was elected as its General Secretary in 1985, becoming "the first woman elected to lead a major industrial union".

She recognised the threats to her members' jobs of impending changes in the print industry, and, it later became clear, held private meetings with Rupert Murdoch in secret to discuss his plans. During the Wapping dispute of 1986/87, she "became one of the best-known trade union leaders in Britain." However, in her attempts to resolve the strike, "she was bitterly denounced by some people in the militant Fleet Street chapels (union branches) as a “Judas”, she was derided as “a film star” because of her blond good looks and her leadership was decried when she put the survival of the union, with 90% of its members in the provinces, ahead of what was essentially a London dispute."

In 1991, SOGAT became part of the Graphical, Paper and Media Union. Dean stood for the general secretaryship, but was narrowly defeated by Tony Dubbins, by 78,654 votes to 72,657. Instead, she became the union's deputy general secretary, serving for a single year before resigning.

== Member of the House of Lords ==
Dean was raised to the peerage in October 1993 as Baroness Dean of Thornton-le-Fylde, of Eccles in the County of Greater Manchester and was appointed to the Privy Council in 1998.

She was a member of the Labour opposition front bench in the House of Lords from 1994 until 1997, and a member of the National Committee of Inquiry into Higher Education that published an influential report in 1997. She chaired the armed forces pay review body (1999-2004), the Covent Garden market authority (2005–13) and the Housing Corporation, now Homes England, (1997-2003); and was a member of the Royal Commission on House of Lords Reform in 1999.

== Other activities ==
She was elected a Fellow of the Royal Society of Arts in 1992.

Her autobiography, Hot Mettle, deals largely with her tenure as SOGAT General Secretary at the time of Rupert Murdoch's battles with her own and other trades unions, notably the Wapping dispute. She was a vice-president of the Debating Group.

She was interviewed by National Life Stories in 2007–8 for the 'Oral History of the British Press' collection held by the British Library.

She became a director for Labour Tomorrow on 28 June 2016, an organisation that funds groups that oppose Jeremy Corbyn as Labour leader.

== Personal life ==
From 1977, her partner was Keith McDowall, later deputy director general of the Confederation of British Industry; they married in 1988.

Brenda Dean died on 13 March 2018, aged 74. Her death was described as "sudden" and "a shock" by Conservative peer Philip Norton.

== Theatre portrayal ==
In March 2026 the story of Brenda Dean and her fight to save 5000 jobs premiered as In The Print at the King’s Head Theatre, Islington.

Written by Robert Khan and Tom Salinsky, the play depicts a true story of power, print and protest and portrays Dean’s influence in matters that changed Fleet Street forever.

Trade union offices
Preceded by Bill Keys; Owen O'Brien	General Secretary of SOGAT; 1985–1991	Position abolished
New post	Deputy General Secretary of the Graphical, Paper and Media Union; 1991 – 1992	Succeeded by Gerry Sutcliffe
