= Eddie Smith (trade unionist) =

British trade union leader

Edwin Smith (died 1945) was a British trade union leader.

Smith worked as a printers' assistant for various magazines and newspapers. He joined the Printers' Labourers' Union, and became Father of the Chapel firstly at The Field, then at Queen, and finally at the Daily Mail. In 1897, he became the chair of the union, and argued for it to change its name to reflect the fact that most of its members were skilled workers who would not generally be regarded as labourers. This was approved, and at the start of 1899 the union was renamed as the "Operative Printers' Assistants Union".

In 1897, Michael Vaughan was elected as general secretary of the union, but in 1898 he permitted a lapsed member of the society to remain on the ballot to replace Smith as the union's chair. The union's executive viewed this as dereliction of duty, and removed him from office. Smith was appointed as acting general secretary, and he then beat James Keep by 924 votes to 147 in an election, to win the position on a permanent basis.

As leader of the union, Smith focused on centralising its organisation and finances. He transferred its banking to the London Trading Bank, and was able to employ a clerk to assist him. He affiliated the union with the London Printing and Kindred Trades Federation in 1901, and the following year, he represented it at the refounding of the national Printing and Kindred Trades Federation.

The union only operated in London until 1904, but Smith then toured the country, establishing new branches in Leeds, Leicester, Liverpool, Manchester and Reading. In 1907 he moved the union's offices to Caxton House on Blackfriars Road, and he also established a superannuation scheme for members. He kept the union out of party politics, and personally generally identified with the Liberal-Labour tradition.

In the second half of 1908, the union had to make numerous unexpected welfare payments to members. This led to a financial crisis, and Smith retired abruptly, to be replaced by George Isaacs. Smith moved to Canada, but the union remained appreciative of his service. When he visited London in 1925, the union sent him a formal letter greeting him and wishing him well.

Trade union offices
Preceded by Michael Vaughan	General Secretary of the Operative Printers' Assistants' Union; 1898–1908	Succeeded by George Isaacs
