= National Typographical Association =

Former trade union of the United Kingdom

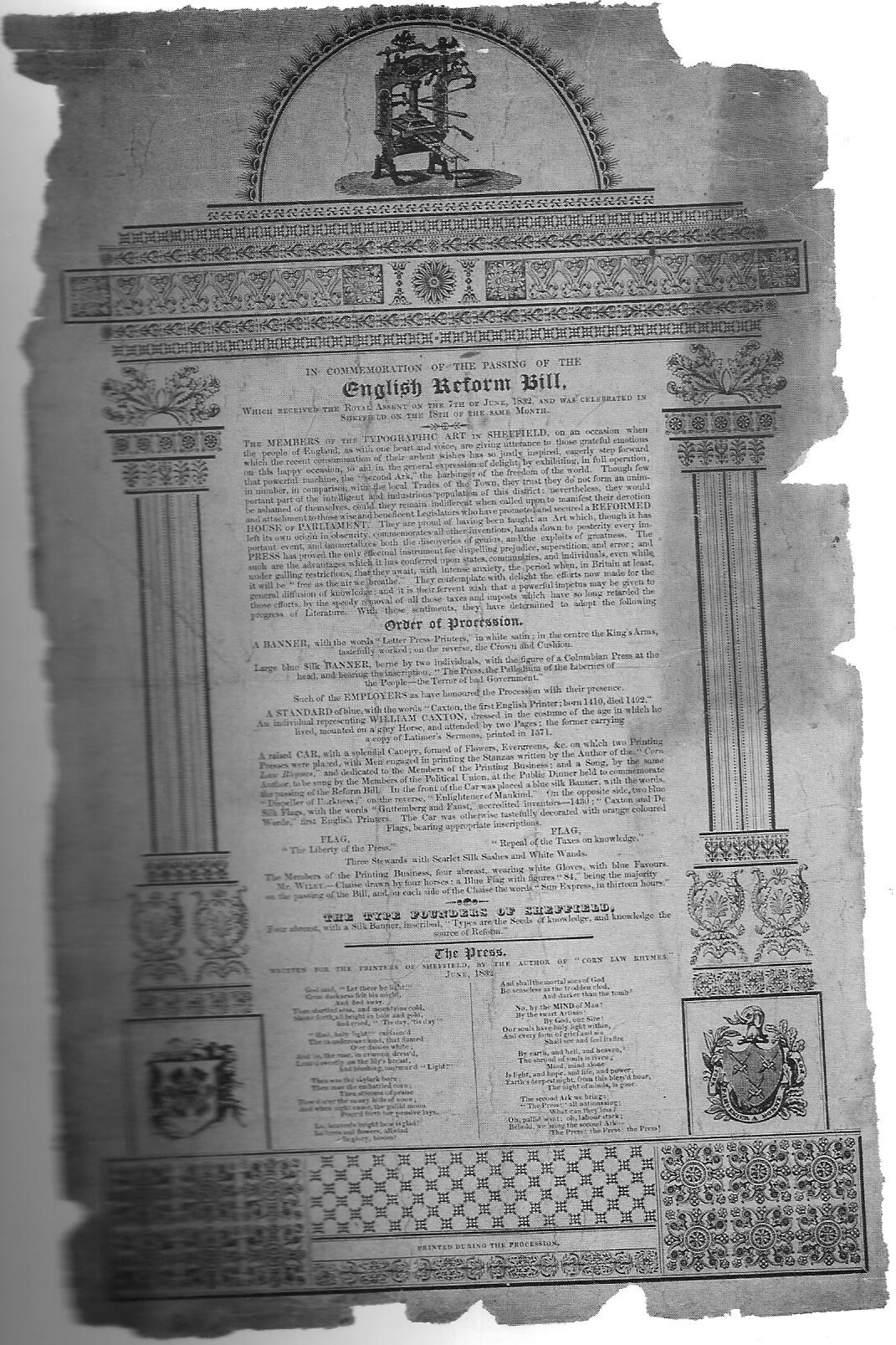
Poster produced by the Sheffield Typographical Association, a constituent society of the Northern Typographical Union, in support of the Reform Act 1832.

The National Typographical Association was an early British trade union, operating on a national basis.

The union was founded in 1830 as the Northern Typographical Union, a federation of small, local societies in England and the Isle of Man, including the well-established Manchester Typographical Society. Led by John Backhouse, the Association aimed to co-ordinate the activities of its member organisations. By 1840, the union had 44 member societies, representing more than 1,000 members.

During the early 1840s, the union began organising typographers in southern towns, but suffered setbacks due to a recession. As a result, it reconstituted itself as the "National Typographical Association" in 1844. By 1846, the organisation had 74 branches and 5,418 members. The London Union of Compositors had reconstituted itself as the South East Region, and the General Typographical Association of Scotland as the Northern Region. However, the organisation had insufficient income to cover disputes, and following a major strike in Edinburgh during 1848, it was forced to dissolve.

The Association's South East Region re-established itself as the London Society of Compositors, while several societies in the north of England formed the Provincial Typographical Association. It was not until 1853 that the surviving Scottish societies formed the Scottish Typographical Association.
