= John Mack (British politician) =

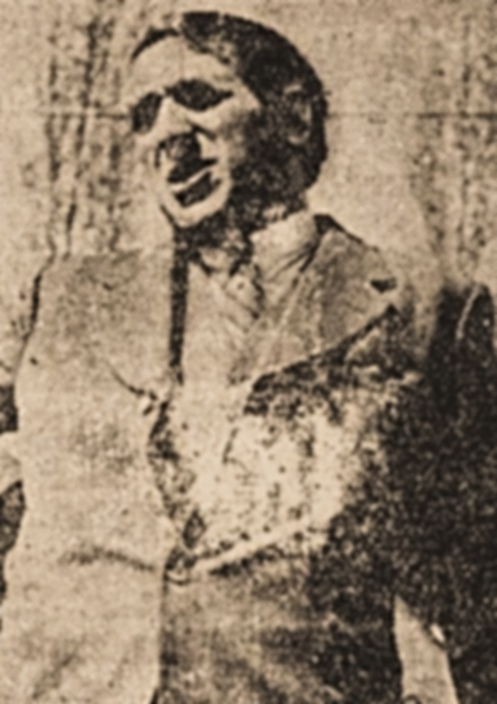
Mack in Bucharest, April 1946

John David Mack (26 June 1891 – 9 February 1957) was a Labour Party politician in the United Kingdom. He was a member of parliament (MP) from 1942 to 1951.

Born in Liverpool as Jacob David Mack, he grew up in Wrexham before becoming a life assurance agent in Liverpool. Mack became active in the National Amalgamated Union of Life Assurance Workers, then began working for the Labour Party as a lecturer. In 1928, he was elected to Liverpool City Council, serving until 1946.

Mack unsuccessfully contested the Wallasey constituency at the 1929 general election and at the 1931 election. He did not contest the 1935 general election, but in 1942 he was elected unopposed at a by-election on 11 March in the Newcastle-under-Lyme constituency. The seat had been vacated when the sitting Labour MP Josiah Wedgwood was elevated to the peerage.

Mack represented the constituency until he stood down at the 1951 general election.

Mack was active in the Liverpool branch of Poale Zion, and served as a vice-president of the Committee for a Jewish Army, which led to the formation of the Jewish Brigade. In 1946, he travelled to Bulgaria and Romania to ask their new governments to assist surviving Jews in those countries.

Parliament of the United Kingdom
Preceded by Josiah Wedgwood	Member of Parliament for Newcastle-under-Lyme; 1942–1951	Succeeded by Stephen Swingler
