= National Union of Press Telegraphists =

Former trade union of the United Kingdom

The National Union of Press Telegraphists (NUPT) was a trade union representing newspaper and news agency staff involved in communications.

The union was founded in 1909, and by 1911 had only 142 members. In 1923, it affiliated to the Trades Union Congress, and it grew steadily, reaching 444 members that year, and 1,500 members by the mid-1960s. From 1924, it published a journal, The Press Telegraphist.

In 1964, the Typographical Association and the London Typographical Society merged to form the National Graphical Association (NGA). The NUPT supported this consolidation, so in June 1965, it also merged into the NGA.

== General Secretaries ==
G. W. Pryke
S. Cox
1920s: T. H. Andrewartha
1936: Vernon Allen
1951: M. A. Clayton
