= Jennifer White Shah =

British actress (1943–2023)

- Born: Jennifer Farquharson White; 16 February 1943; Cardiff, Wales, United Kingdom
- Died: 20 August 2023 (aged 80); Wiltshire, England
- Other name: Jenny White
- Occupation: Actress
- Spouse: Eddy Shah (m. 1970)
- Children: 3

Jennifer Farquharson White Shah (16 February 1943 – 20 August 2023), also known as Jenny White, was a British actress.

== Life and career ==
Jennifer Farquharson White was born in Cardiff, Wales, on 16 February 1943.

White played Julia Livilla in The Caesars and also appeared in the original Casino Royale film and in Carry on Doctor.

White was married to newspaper owner and writer Eddy Shah. She died on 20 August 2023, at the age of 80.
