= National Amalgamated Union of Life Assurance Workers =

Former trade union of the United Kingdom

- Merged into: National Union of Insurance Workers
- Founded: 1919
- Dissolved: 1964
- Headquarters: 11 Mauldeth Road, Manchester
- Location: United Kingdom
- Members: 14,106 (1923)
- Affiliations: TUC, ITUC, Labour

The National Amalgamated Union of Life Assurance Workers (NAULAW) was a trade union representing insurance workers in the United Kingdom and Ireland.

== History ==
The union was founded in 1919 when the National Union of Life Insurance Agents merged with the National Association of Prudential Insurance Agents, the Blackburn Philanthropic Agents Association, the National Association of Wesleyan and General Insurance Agents, and the Planet Agents Association. Although all the founding organisations mentioned insurance agents in their name, other workers in the industry, including managers and clerical staff, were also represented.

By 1923, the union already had 14,106 members, although this fell to only 7,722 by 1948, and just 2,238 by 1963. It merged with the National Federation of Insurance Workers in 1964, forming the National Union of Insurance Workers.

== Election results ==
The union sponsored a Labour Party candidate in several Parliamentary elections, including a Member of Parliament from 1942 to 1951.

Election	Constituency	Candidate	Votes	Percentage	Position
1931 general election	Liverpool Everton	Samuel Lewis Treleaven	7,786	31.2	2
1942 by-election	Newcastle-under-Lyme	John Mack	unopposed	N/A	1
1945 general election	Newcastle-under-Lyme	John Mack	25,903	66.2	1
1950 general election	Newcastle-under-Lyme	John Mack	30,249	57.8	1

== General Secretaries ==
1919: Bernard Brooke
1926: W. Sheard
c.1950: William B. Hannaford
1959: Frank Crump
1963: W. Hindson
