= Bill O'Neill (media) =

Australian businessman

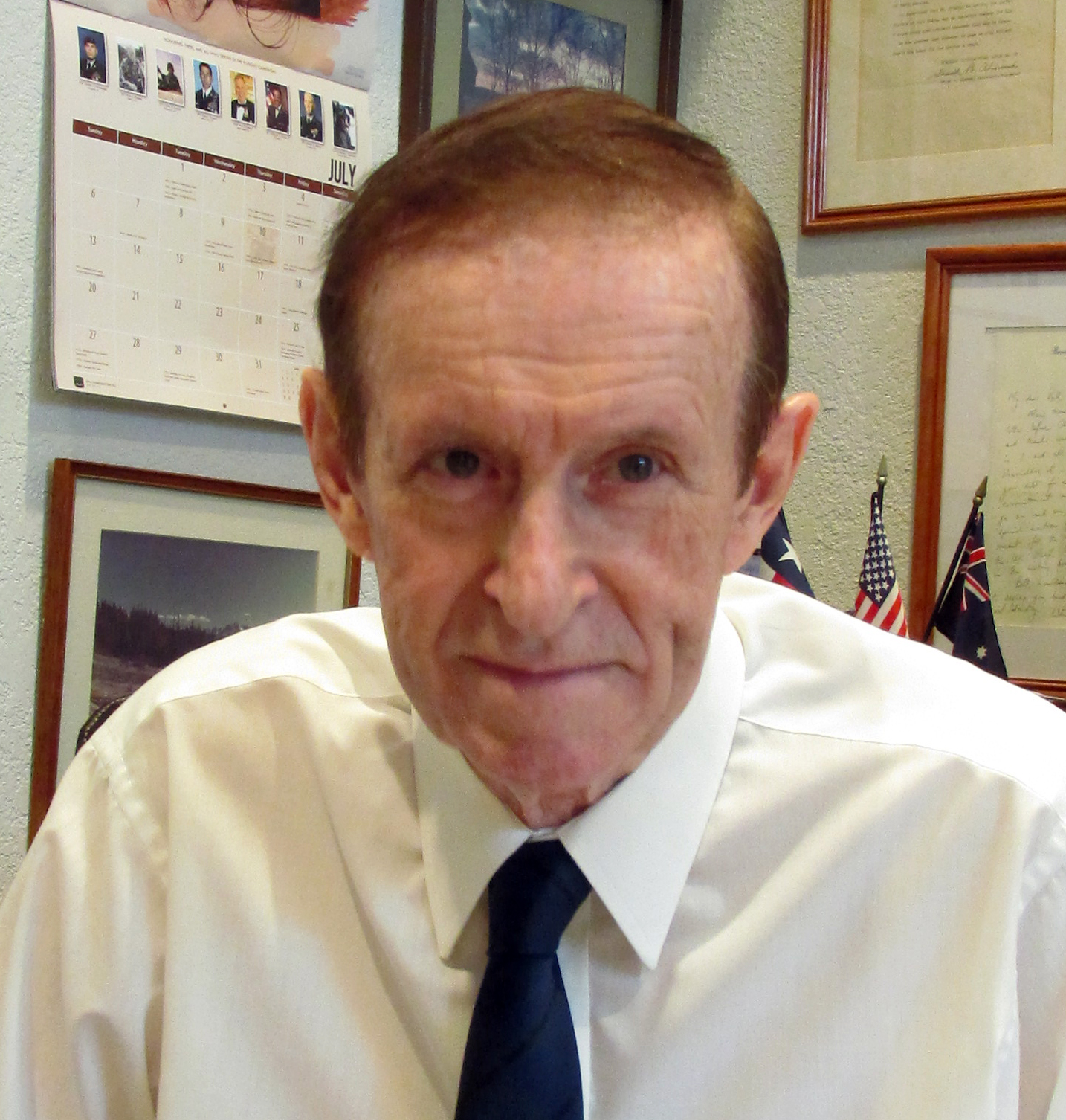
- Born: May 22, 1936 (age 90); Sydney, Australia
- Citizenship: United States/Australia
- Occupations: Former Director of News Corporation; Former EVP of News Corporation; CEO of News International, EVP and GM of New York Post
- Spouse(s): Alene Joy Brown, m. 1962

William Alan O'Neill (born May 22, 1936) is an Australian-American former media executive. He held multiple positions within News Corporation, including two separate terms as head of News International, director on the company's main board, and executive vice president of News Corporation with global responsibility for human resources, over a period of 50 years.

== Early life and education ==
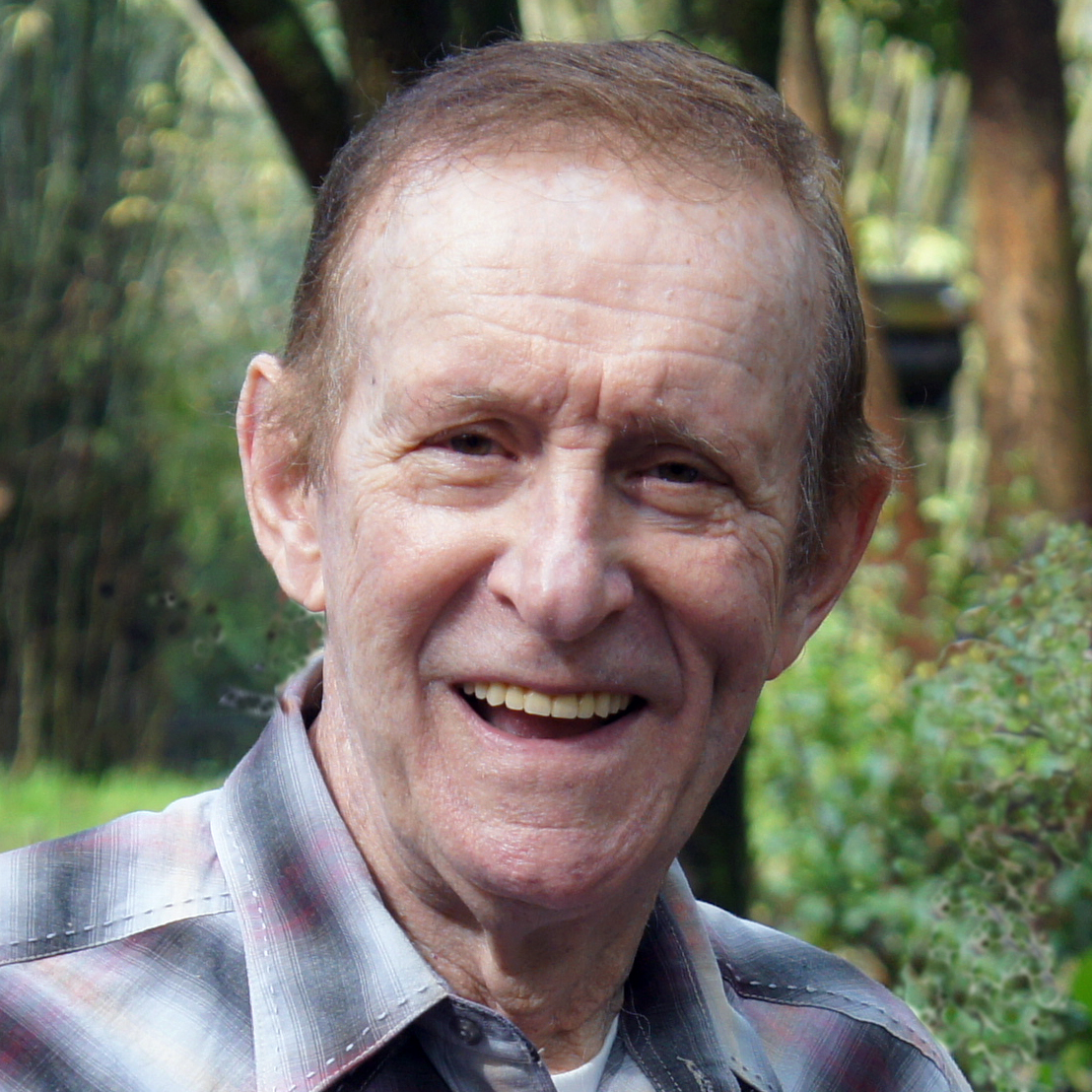
Bill O'Neill in 2014

William Alan O'Neill was born on May 22, 1936 in Sydney, Australia)

In 1952, he commenced a six-year apprenticeship as a hand and machine compositor with Truth and Sportsman, publisher of the Sydney Daily Mirror.

== Career ==
After completing his apprenticeship and military draft commitment in the Australian Army, O'Neill traveled to the United States, where in 1958, he joined the International Typographical Union in San Francisco. He also worked for a time in Canada and was employed with The Vancouver Sun when, in 1958, it merged with the other major newspaper, The Province.

He returned to Australia and the Daily Mirror as a Linotype operator just before the company was bought by Rupert Murdoch in May 1960.

O'Neill brought an interest in trade unionism with him from America and became a vice president of the New South Wales branch of the Printing Industries Employees' Union of Australia. Disenchanted with union politics, he joined a research and development team within Murdoch's News Limited and after a short time was selected to lead the company's industrial relations. In 1981 he was sent to London to negotiate with the Fleet Street unions. A successful agreement allowed Rupert Murdoch to purchase The Times and Sunday Times. O'Neill and fellow British negotiator, John Collier, were named Joint General Managers of Times Newspapers Limited and appointed to its board.

In 1983 he negotiated with the print unions for their entry to the new print center at Wapping. Talks broke down and he took over duties in New York as vice president/labor relations at News America. His responsibilities involved the New York Post, the Boston Herald, the San Antonio Express-News and the Chicago Sun-Times.

In 1985 he was sent back to London to again negotiate with the print unions regarding Wapping. These talks were unsuccessful and led to the 13-month-long Wapping dispute.

Most of 1986 saw him fulfilling the role of general manager at the New York Post and meeting with the British unions in an attempt to bring the strike to an end. The strike finally came to an end of February 6, 1987. At the beginning of 1987 he took over as managing director of News International, responsible for The Times, the Sunday Times, The Sun, the News of the World and later, the Today newspaper. He was appointed to the News Corporation Board of Directors that year and served until 1990. He transferred management of News International to Gus Fischer and returned to the United States at the beginning of 1990 to lead News Corporation's global human resources program.

On 25 November 1990, O'Neill arrived in Geneva, Switzerland, to represent the United States as the employer delegate at a tripartite meeting of the International Labour Organization. He had been nominated to attend by the American Newspaper Publishers Association. The week-long meeting was convened to discuss the international working conditions of journalists. Little was achieved, and this led The Guild Reporter, voice of The Newspaper Guild to write in its issue of December 14, 1990, "the cause was the U.S. labor-management issues that simmered constantly beneath the surface."

O'Neill testified before a U.S. Congressional Committee in 1991 as an expert witness on the Striker Replacement Bill. In 1993, he led the management team negotiating with the unions that led to News Corporation reacquiring the New York Post.

In 1995, he was back at Wapping, this time as CEO, while a management reshuffle was effected. At year's end he handed over control of News International to incoming chairman, Les Hinton.

Until his retirement in 2002, he continued in his role as News Corporation's executive vice president of human resources. He left the company exactly 50 years from the day he started on the Sydney Daily Mirror as a 15-year-old apprentice.

Following his retirement O'Neill compiled a memoir that dealt with his involvement in the acquisition of Times Newspapers, the Wapping Strike and the reacquisition of the New York Post. Since 2009 the memoir, titled "Copy Out!" has been available from the University of Warwick.

In July 2011, at the height of the phone hacking scandal at the News of the World, he was contacted by the BBC's Business Daily Program and interviewed on his years with News Corporation and his impression of Rupert Murdoch's contribution to the newspaper publishing industry.

== Personal life ==
O'Neill married Alene Joy Brown in February 1962. She died on January 30, 2018. Their son, David, died on February 19, 2012, aged 47, after a lifetime career in newspapers.

In 1993, O'Neill became a United States citizen. As of 2011 O'Neill was living in San Antonio, Texas,

O'Neill is a lifetime member of the American Australian Association.
