= Claude Bartlett =

British trade union leader (1897–1972)

Claude Bartlett (1897 – 1 April 1972) was a British trade union leader.

Bartlett worked in asylums and joined the National Asylum Workers' Union in 1919. He became President of the union in 1927, which in 1931 was renamed the "Mental Hospital and Institutional Workers' Union", all the while remaining a hospital employee. He chaired the conference which saw the union merge with others to form the Confederation of Health Service Employees, and was also elected as president of the new union.

In 1948, Bartlett was elected to the General Council of the Trades Union Congress, and in 1960, he became President of the Trades Union Congress, the first holder of that post in many years to remain in non-trade union employment. He was appointed a CBE in 1960, and retired in 1962.

Following his retirement, Bartlett lived in Ivybridge in Devon, where he served as a parish councillor.

Trade union offices
Preceded by E. R. Blackburn	President of the Mental Hospital and Institutional Workers' Union; 1927–1946	Succeeded by Position abolished
Preceded by New position	President of the Confederation of Health Service Employees; 1946–1962	Succeeded by Ron Farmer
Preceded by Robert Willis	President of the Trades Union Congress; 1960	Succeeded by Ted Hill
Preceded by Frank Cousins and Frederick Hayday	Trades Union Congress representative to the AFL-CIO; 1961; With: Bill Webber	Succeeded by Harry Douglass and Anne Godwin
