= Wapping dispute =

Failed strike by print workers in England

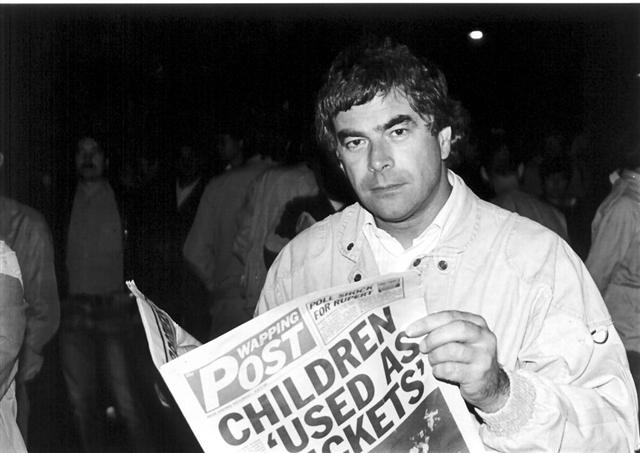
Tony Dubbins, General Secretary of the National Graphical Association, on the picket line during the Wapping dispute

The Wapping dispute was a lengthy failed strike by print workers in London in 1986.

Print unions tried to block distribution of The Sunday Times, along with other newspapers in Rupert Murdoch's News International group, after production was shifted to a new plant in Wapping in January 1986.

At the new facility, modern computer facilities allowed journalists to input copy directly, rather than involving print union workers who used older "hot-metal" Linotype printing methods. All of the workers were dismissed. The failure of the strike was devastating for the print union workers, and it led both to a general decline in trade union influence in the UK, and to a widespread adoption of modern newspaper publishing practices.

== Political significance ==
Along with the miners' strike of 1984–85, the Wapping dispute was a significant defeat in the history of the British trade union movement. The 51-week miners' strike of 1984–85 was followed a year later by the 54-week "Wapping dispute" launched by newspaper printers in London. It resulted in a second major defeat for unions and another victory for Margaret Thatcher's union policies, especially her assurance that the police would defend the plants against pickets trying to shut them down. The target was Britain's largest privately-owned newspaper company, News International (parent of The Times and News of the World and others, all owned by Rupert Murdoch). He wanted to introduce technological innovations that would put 90% of the old-fashioned typesetters out of work. The company offered redundancy payments of £2,000 to £30,000 to each printer to quit their old jobs. The union rejected the offer and on 24 January 1986 its 6,000 members at Murdoch's papers went on strike. Meanwhile News International had built and clandestinely equipped a new printing plant in the London district of Wapping.

The principal print unions – the National Graphical Association (NGA), the Society of Graphical and Allied Trades (SOGAT 82) and the Amalgamated Union of Engineering Workers (AUEW) – ran closed shops: only union members could be hired at the old Fleet Street plants; most were sons of members. The new plant in Wapping did not have a closed shop contract. The company activated its new plant with the assistance of another union, the Electrical, Electronic, Telecommunications and Plumbing Union (EETPU). Most members of the National Union of Journalists moved to Wapping and NUJ Chapels continued to operate. The NUJ urged its member journalists not to work there and many NUJ members, known as "refuseniks", refused to go to Wapping. However, enough printers were employed – 670 in all – to produce the same number of newspapers that it took 6,800 employees to print at the old shop. The efficiency was obvious and frightened the union into holding out an entire year. Thousands of union pickets tried to block shipments out of the plant; they injured 574 policemen. There were 1,500 arrests. The pickets failed. The union tried an illegal secondary boycott and was fined in court, losing all of its assets. In the next two years Britain's national newspapers opened new plants and abandoned Fleet Street, adopting the new technology with far fewer employees. This is thought to have led to greater support for Thatcher among the press.

== Background ==
For years Fleet Street had been living with poor industrial relations, and the so-called "Spanish practices" – irregular or restrictive work practices – maintained by trade union officials had put limits on newspaper owners that they considered intolerable. On the other hand, the News International management team, led by Bill O'Neill, was seeking terms that the union considered unacceptable: flexible working, a no-strike clause, the adoption of new technology and the end of the closed shop.

Despite the widespread use of the offset litho printing process elsewhere, the Murdoch papers, in common with the rest of Fleet Street, continued to be produced by the labour-intensive hot-metal Linotype method, rather than being composed electronically. Eddy Shah's Messenger Group, in a long-running and bitter dispute at Warrington, also benefited from the Thatcher government's trade union legislation which allowed employers to de-recognise unions, enabling the Messenger Group to use an alternative workforce and new technology in newspaper production. Journalists could input copy directly, which reduced the need for labour in the print halls, cut costs and shortened production time dramatically.

Although individual journalists (many of whom were members of the National Union of Journalists) worked "behind the wire" for News International at Wapping, the NUJ opposed the move to Wapping and urged its members not to do so without proper negotiations. NUJ members who refused to work at Wapping became known during the dispute as "refuseniks". The NUJ was represented alongside the print unions in the negotiations with News International which eventually led to a monetary settlement.

== Start of dispute ==
Immediately after the strike was announced on 24 January 1986, dismissal notices were served on all those taking part in the industrial action, effectively sacking 6,000 employees. The timing of these dismissals followed legal advice that removing employees while they were taking part in strike action would prevent claims for redundancy payments and unfair dismissal under section 62 of the Employment Protection (Consolidation) Act 1978. This approach avoided paying an estimated £40 million in redundancy compensation. As part of a plan that had been developed over many months, the company replaced the workforce with members of the EETPU and transferred its four main titles (The Times, The Sunday Times, The Sun and the News of the World) to the Wapping plant.

Murdoch had led the print unions to think that the Wapping plant was to be used for a new evening newspaper, the London Post. This began what became known as the Wapping dispute. In support of sacked members, the print unions organised regular demonstrations outside the company's premises in Pennington Street, with six pickets posted on Virginia Street and marches of large numbers of people usually converging nearby on The Highway in Wapping.

The demonstrations outside the Wapping plant were not peaceful, although the trade unions maintained that they were committed to pursuing peaceful means to resolve the dispute.

The unions and leading members of the Labour Party also called for a boycott of the four newspapers involved. The print unions had encouraged the national boycott of Murdoch's papers, and had been relying on the rail unions to ensure that they were not distributed, a problem Murdoch circumvented by distributing his papers via TNT instead of British Rail's trains.

Like the miners' strike, large demonstrations were mounted to dissuade workers – in this case, TNT's drivers as well as journalists and operators of the new printing process – from entering the premises, and a large police operation used force to ensure they were not able to physically stop the movement of TNT's lorries distributing newspapers from the plant. More than 400 police officers, some TNT drivers and many members of the public were injured, and more than 1,200 arrests made during the dispute. A large-scale police operation was mounted throughout London to ensure the Wapping plant could operate effectively, and the movement of local residents was heavily restricted. To ensure their safety, workers at the plant were often taken to and from work in buses modified to withstand the attacks they came under.

Despite some public sympathy for the plight of the pickets, the boycott of Wapping's news titles was not successful, and not a single day of production was lost throughout the year of the dispute's duration.

== End of strike ==
News International's strategy in Wapping had strong government support, and enjoyed almost full production and distribution capabilities and a complement of leading journalists. The company was therefore content to allow the dispute to run its course. With thousands of workers having gone for over a year without jobs or pay, the strike eventually collapsed on 5 February 1987.

With the restrictive trade union practices associated with the traditional Fleet Street publishing empires removed, the trade union movement in Britain was irrevocably changed. The actions of News International and Rupert Murdoch, together with the EETPU and the police were criticised – in particular the policing methods that were employed. People in Wapping were largely viewed by the police as sympathetic to the strikers, and were frequently denied access to their own streets and homes. The strike also coincided with the redevelopment of the Docklands, of which Wapping is a part, and saw the end of the traditional association of the area with the labour movement.

By 1988, nearly all the national newspapers had abandoned Fleet Street to relocate in the Docklands, and had begun to change their printing practices to those being employed by News International. In 2016 the Dundee-based Sunday Post closed the last remaining Fleet Street newspaper office.

== See also ==
- NGA Dispute – 1983 labour dispute

== Sources ==
- Haldane Society of Socialist Lawyers, A Case to Answer? A report on the policing of the News International demonstration at Wapping on 24 January 1987, The Haldane Society of Socialist Lawyers, 1987
- B MacArthur, Eddy Shah: Today and the Newspaper Revolution, David & Charles, 1988
- L Melvern, The End of the Street, Octavo/Methuen, 1986
- A Mintz et al., The Picket
- National Council for Civil Liberties, No Way in Wapping, Civil Liberties Trust, 1986
- N Oatridge, Wapping '86: The Strike that Broke Britain's Newspaper Unions, Coldtype, 2002
- J Pilger, Hidden Agendas, Vintage, 1998 (Fortress Wapping – extract)
- M Richardson, Leadership, Mobilisation and the 1986–87 News International dispute, Paper submitted to the Historical Studies in Industrial Relations and the Society for the Study of Labour History Joint Conference, 2002
- P Wintour, The Rise & Fall of Fleet Street, Hutchinson, 1991
- Mark Steel, "Reasons to be Cheerful"
- Marco Pellegrino, From the Winter of Discontent to the Wapping Dispute: A critical assessment of the relation between the British government and the Conservative press, 2017
