= Graphical, Paper and Media Union =

1991–2005 trade union in the UK

GPMU
- Graphical, Paper and Media Union
- Merged into: Amicus
- Founded: 1991
- Dissolved: 2005
- Headquarters: 63-67 Bromham Road, Bedford
- Location: United Kingdom
- Members: 282,000 (1991)
- Key people: Tony Dubbins, General Secretary
- Affiliations: TUC
- Website: www.gpmu.org.uk

The Graphical, Paper and Media Union (GPMU) was a trade union in the United Kingdom and Ireland between 1991 and 2005.

== History ==
The GPMU was formed from the merger of SOGAT and the National Graphical Association (NGA) and claimed to be the world's largest media union, having over 200,000 members working in the print, publishing, paper, IT and media industries.

The general secretaries of both predecessor unions stood in the GPMU leadership election, with an agreement that the loser would become deputy general secretary. Tony Dubbins of the NGA narrowly defeated Brenda Dean of SOGAT, by 78,654 votes to 72,657. Dubbins served as general secretary throughout the GPMU's existence, but Dean stood down after one year; in 1994, Tony Burke became deputy general secretary. The first general president was Bryn Griffith, former general president of the NGA, who defeated Danny Sergeant of SOGAT. Griffith was succeeded by Doug Douglas, following a controversial High Court case, when the union tried to ignore the ballot result in 1995.

Facing a decline in membership, in February 2004, GPMU opened merger negotiations with the skilled engineering, manufacturing and white collar union Amicus. In August 2004, results of a ballot of all members were released, showing 86% of members in favour of merger. The formal merger took place in early 2005, (at the same time the finance union UNIFI joined Amicus) and GPMU became the semi-autonomous Graphical, Paper and Media sector of Amicus. Tony Dubbins became the deputy general secretary of Amicus and Tony Burke became assistant general secretary of Amicus. Tony Dubbins was also the union's political head and chair of TULO. He retired to Spain in October, 2008.

Amicus merged with the Transport & General Workers Union in May 2007 to form Unite the Union. The GPM sector of Amicus become the Graphical, Paper & Media sector of Unite the Union.

Tony Burke became the assistant general secretary of Unite responsible for the union's manufacturing section.

In 2014 faced with major changes to the print, communications and the media industries, the Unite sectors GPM merged with Information, Technology and Communications sector to form the GPM ITC sector, currently known as the GPM & IT sector.

A permanent display of memorabilia and the history of the print and papermaking unions of the UK and Ireland is housed at the Marx Memorial Library in Clerkenwell, London.

== Election results ==
The union sponsored several Parliamentary candidates, many of whom won election. All such sponsorship arrangements ended in 1995, when the Labour Party changed its rules.

Election	Constituency	Candidate	Votes	Percentage	Position
1992 general election	Bradford North	Terry Rooney	23,420	47.8	1
1992 general election	Clackmannan	Martin O'Neill	18,829	49.1	1
1992 general election	Leeds North East	Fabian Hamilton	18,218	36.8	2
1992 general election	Leicester South	Jim Marshall	27,934	52.3	1
1992 general election	Manchester Central	Bob Litherland	23,336	72.7	1
1992 general election	Newham North East	Ron Leighton	20,952	58.3	1
1992 general election	Stretford	Tony Lloyd	22,300	59.6	1
1994 by-election	Bradford South	Gerry Sutcliffe	17,014	55.3	1
