= Society of Lithographic Artists, Designers and Engravers =

Former trade union of the United Kingdom

SLADE
- Society of Lithographic Artists, Designers and Engravers
- Merged: National Graphical Association (1982)
- Founded: 1885
- Dissolved: 1982
- Headquarters: Slade House, Clapham Common, London
- Location: United Kingdom
- Members: 24,921 (1980)
- Publication: SLADE Journal
- Affiliations: TUC, P&KTF, Labour

The Society of Lithographic Artists, Designers and Engravers (SLADE) was a British trade union representing workers in the printing industry.

== History ==
The union was formed in Manchester in 1885 as the National Society of Lithographic Artists, Designers and Writers, Copperplate and Wood Engravers, and it became the Society of Lithographic Artists, Designers, Engravers and Process Workers in 1903. In 1919, it relocated to London.

The United Society of Engravers merged into SLADE in 1972, which promptly formed a wallpaper and textiles section. In 1975, the Slade Art Union was formed as an autonomous section of SLADE, hoping to attract workers involved in preparing photography and art.

In the 1970s, SLADE was one of several trade unions targeted for criticism by Conservative Party politicians and the right-wing press as part of their campaign against the closed shop, being singled out for an enquiry into their activities in the Conservative manifesto for the 1979 UK general election. SLADE was attacked for seeking to extend unionisation into new areas of the print origination sector where they were trying to recruit and to negotiate 'Union Membership Agreements' or 'Agency Agreements' (a type of 'pre-entry closed shop' where the trade union acts as a staff recruitment agency) with employers. Such arrangements largely disappeared in the printing industry (and elsewhere) following anti-Union legislation passed by Margaret Thatcher's Conservative government in the 1980s and the successful assault on the print unions (after SLADE had merged with the NGA) led by Rupert Murdoch's News International Company in 1986.

SLADE amalgamated with the larger skilled workers' (craft) union in the printing industry, the National Graphical Association (NGA), in 1982 to form the National Graphical Association (1982).

== Sponsored Members of Parliament ==
The union sponsored two Members of Parliament from 1979 onwards. Although SLADE had merged into the NGA by the 1983 general election, the MPs were sponsored in that election by the specific SLADE section of the NGA, rather than the merged union.

Election	Constituency	Candidate	Votes	Percentage	Position
1983 general election	Clackmannan and Eastern Stirlingshire	Martin O'Neill	22,780	41.9	1
1983 general election	Hyndburn	Arthur Davidson	19,384	42.2	1

== General Secretaries ==
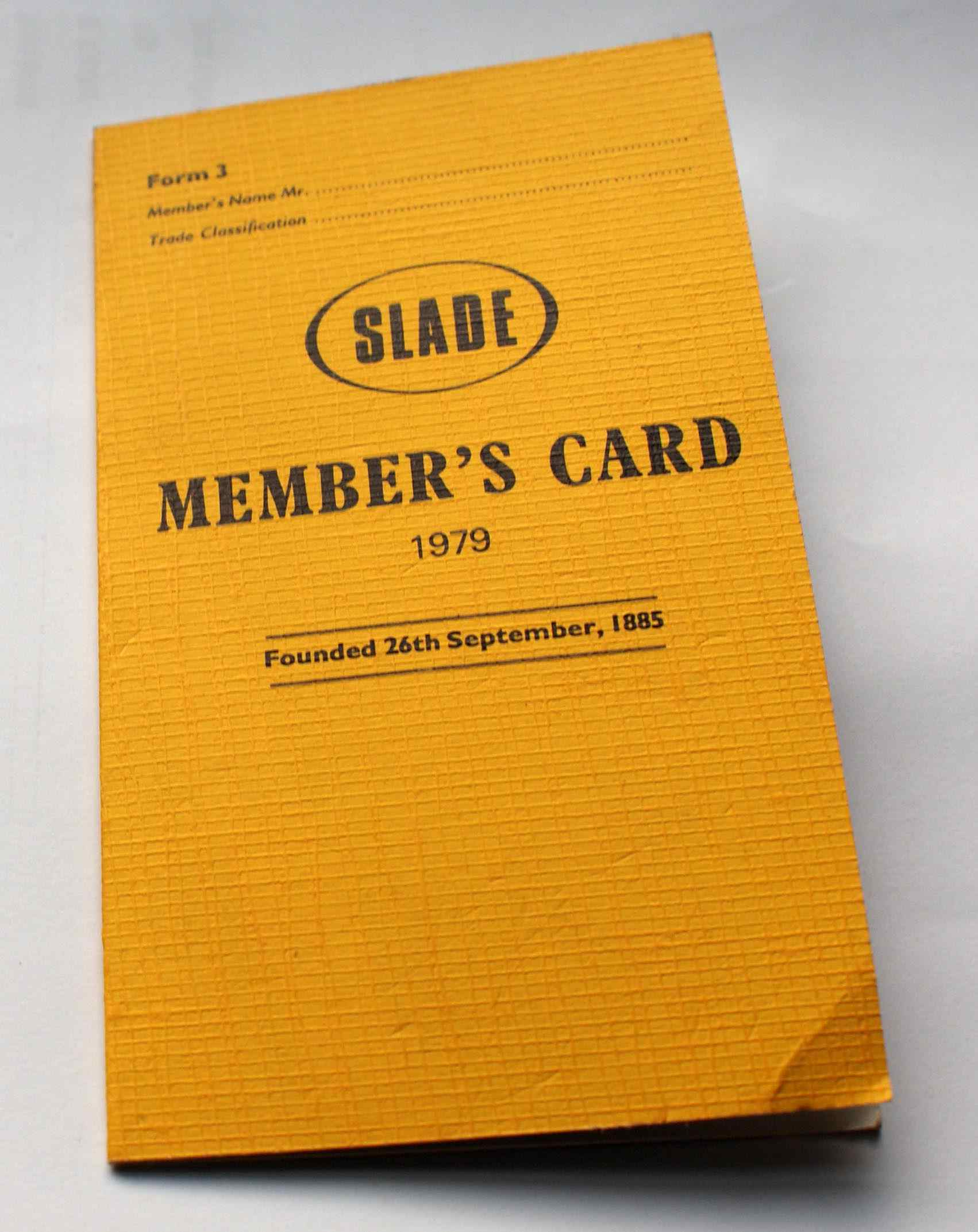
A union membership card

1885: Charles Harrap
1899: Robert Barnes
1917: Rupert Kneale
1941: Victor M. Butler
1956: H. G. Bellingham
1969: Len Knapp
1972: John Jackson
