= John Bonfield =

British trade unionist

- Born: John Martin Bonfield; 1 May 1915; England
- Died: 9 January 1976 (aged 60)
- Occupation: Trade unionist

John Martin Bonfield (1 May 1915 – 9 January 1976) was a British trade unionist.

Bonfield grew up in Hitchin in Hertfordshire before becoming a printer. He joined the Typographical Association, becoming its National Assistant Secretary in 1948, then General President in 1955 and General Secretary in 1957. That year, he was also elected to the executive of the International Graphical Federation, becoming president in 1967. In 1961, he was also elected as President of the Printing and Kindred Trades Federation.

Under Bonfield's leadership, the Typographical Association merged with the London Typographical Society to form the National Graphical Association. Bonfield became joint general secretary, with Robert Willis, working alone from 1965 to 1967 while Willis took a leave of absence, and serving permanently alone from 1969, when Willis retired.

Bonfield retired from most of his trade union posts in 1974, although he remained general secretary of the NGA, and also on the Eastern Electricity Board, a part-time post he had held since 1968. He died on 9 January 1976 in Brickhill near Milton Keynes.

Trade union offices
Preceded by F. C. Blackburn	General President of the Typographical Association; 1955–1957	Succeeded by Fred Simmons
Preceded by F. C. Blackburn	General Secretary of the Typographical Association; 1957–1963	Succeeded by Position abolished
Preceded by Bill Morrison	President of the Printing and Kindred Trades Federation; 1961–1973	Succeeded by Position abolished
Preceded by New position	General Secretary of the National Graphical Association; 1964–1976; With: Robert Willis (1964 – 1969)	Succeeded by Joe Wade
Preceded by Ernst Leuenberger	President of the International Graphical Federation; 1967–1976	Succeeded by Leonhard Mahlein
