= Prudential Staff Union =

Former trade union of the United Kingdom

- Merged into: National Union of Insurance Workers
- Founded: October 1909
- Dissolved: 31 December 1984
- Headquarters: 14-17 Holborn Hall, Grays Inn Road, London
- Location: United Kingdom
- Members: 6,677 (1925)
- Publication: Prudential Staff Gazette
- Parent organization: National Union of Insurance Workers (from 1964)
- Affiliations: Labour Party, NFIW

The Prudential Staff Union was a trade union representing workers at the Prudential insurance company, in the United Kingdom. The only union of insurance workers to affiliate to the Labour Party, it was briefly represented on its National Executive Committee, and for a time sponsored a Member of Parliament.

== History ==
In the 1900s, many staff at the Prudential were represented by the National Association of Prudential Assurance Agents (NAPAA). It was led by socialist activists and frequently came into conflict with the company, particularly in its calls for a Charter of Rights for employees. The Prudential Staff Federation was founded in October 1909 as a more moderate rival union. It claimed that the NAPAA was undemocratic, and that it excluded staff other than agents from membership. In contrast, it admitted even superintendents into membership, and called for workers to help the company be more prosperous, an approach strongly favoured by the company's management.

H. Birnage served as general secretary for the first few years, then in 1914 the union appointed Edward Timothy Palmer as his replacement. The federation registered as a trade union in 1915, at which time it had 3,968 members.

Initially named the Prudential Staff Federation, the union became the "Prudential Staff Union" in the early 1920s. It affiliated to the Labour Party, and sponsored Palmer as a candidate in Greenwich in each general election from 1922 to 1929. Palmer won the seat in 1923, and again in 1929. At the 1931 UK general election, the union decided no longer to financially support his candidacy, leaving him to try to fundraise his own expenses, and he lost the seat. Instead, in 1931, much of the union's funds were used to support the successful appeal of its member William Herbert Wallace, who had been charged, convicted, sentenced to death, then had his conviction quashed on the charge of murdering his wife.

By the 1940s, Thomas Scrafton was the union's secretary. He was elected to the Labour Party's National Executive Committee (NEC) in 1945, when James Walker, a sitting member, died. He held his seat in 1946, but stood down the following year.

The union was affiliated to the National Federation of Insurance Workers and, from 1964, to its successor, the National Union of Insurance Workers (NUIW). It was renamed as the National Union of Insurance Workers (Prudential Section), but retained a high level of autonomy until 1984, when it decided to fully merge into the NUIW.

== Election results ==
Election	Constituency	Candidate	Votes	Percentage	Position
1922 general election	Greenwich	Edward Timothy Palmer	10,860	39.1	2
1923 general election	Greenwich	Edward Timothy Palmer	12,314	42.7	1
1924 general election	Greenwich	Edward Timothy Palmer	17,409	48.5	2
1929 general election	Greenwich	Edward Timothy Palmer	20,328	46.3	1

== General Secretaries ==
1909: H. Birnage
1914: Edward Timothy Palmer
1927: Edward Timothy Palmer and William Thomas Brown
1929: William Thomas Brown
1939: Thomas Scrafton
1964: Ernest Lorenz
1983: Ken Perry
