= George Robert Bonfield =

American painter (1802–1898)

- Born: 1802; England, U.K.
- Died: 1898 (aged 95–96)
- Occupation: Painter
- Relatives: William Van de Velde Bonfield (son)

George Robert Bonfield (1802–1898) was an English-born American sketcher and marine painter. His work is in the collections of the National Museum of American History, the Pennsylvania Academy of the Fine Arts, and the Philadelphia Museum of Art.

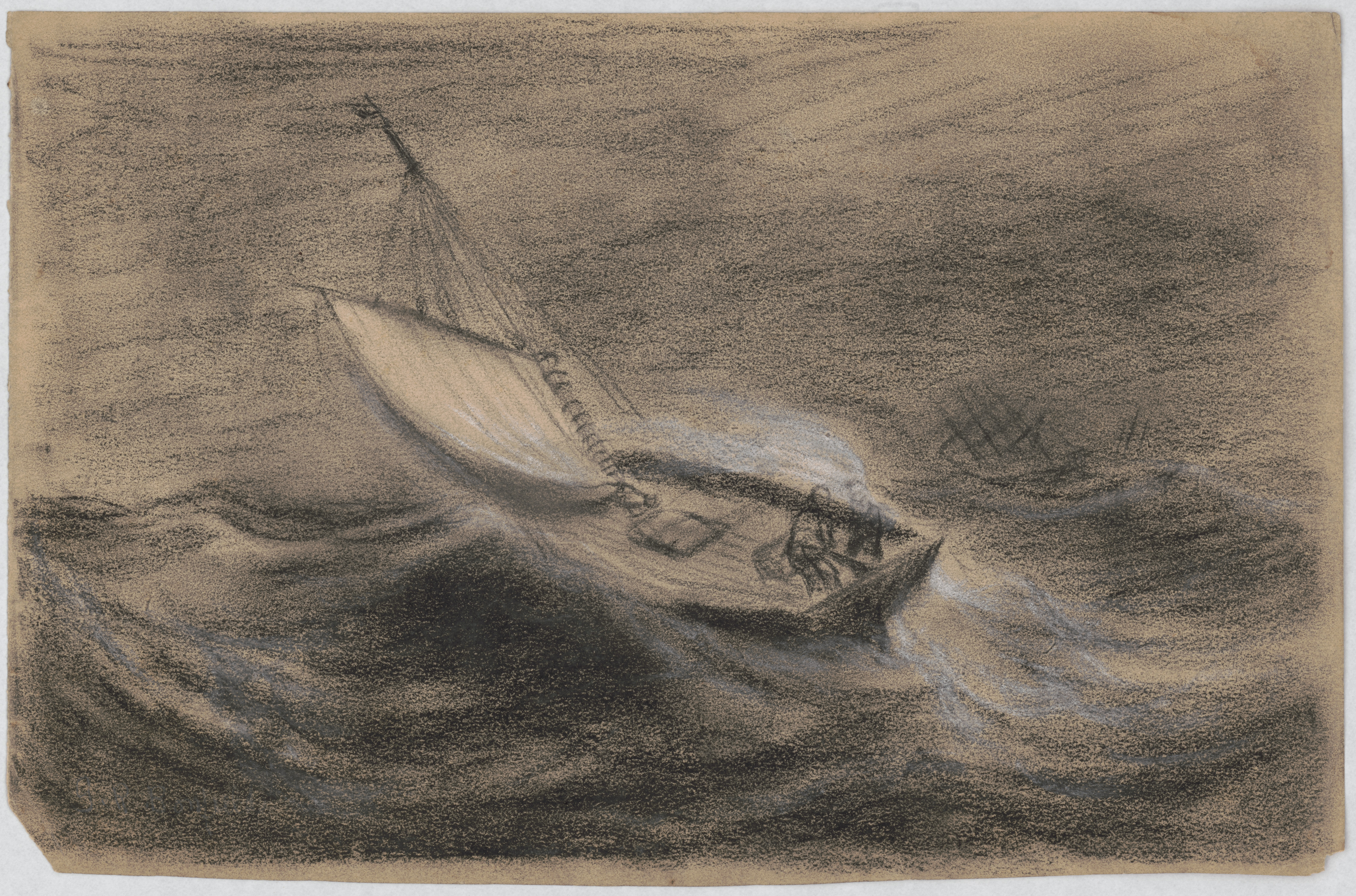
Two men in a small sailboat on rough seas.
