= 1942 Newcastle-under-Lyme by-election =

UK parliamentary by-election

The 1942 Newcastle-under-Lyme by-election was a by-election held for the British House of Commons constituency of Newcastle-under-Lyme on 11 March 1942. The seat had become vacant when the Labour Member of Parliament (MP) Josiah Wedgwood was elevated to the peerage as Baron Wedgwood. He had held the seat since the 1906 general election.

The Labour candidate, John Mack, was returned unopposed; during the Second World War the parties in the wartime coalition government had a pact not to contest by-elections in seats held by the incumbent party. He represented the constituency until he retired from the House of Commons at the 1951 general election.

== See also ==
- List of United Kingdom by-elections
