= National Federation of Insurance Workers =

Former trade union of the United Kingdom

- Merged into: National Union of Insurance Workers
- Founded: 1919
- Dissolved: 1964
- Headquarters: 16 Red Lion Square, London
- Location: United Kingdom
- Members: 24,168 (1938)
- Affiliations: TUC, ITUC

The National Federation of Insurance Workers (NFIW) was a trade union federation of insurance trade unions in the United Kingdom.

The federation was established in 1919, and by 1927 its affiliates had a total of 19,863 members, with around a third of the total being members of the Prudential Staff Union. While its members largely operated independently, the federation represented them at the Trades Union Congress. It continued to grow, and by 1938 represented 24,168 workers. Its affiliates as of 1947 were:

- Britannic Field Staff Association
- Liverpool Victoria Workers' Union
- London and Manchester Field Staff Association
- National Federation of Scottish Legal Life Insurance Agents
- National Pearl Federation
- National Union of Pearl Agents
- Prudential Staff Union
- Refuge Field Staff Association
- Royal Co-operative Agents' and Employees' Union
- Royal Liver Employees' Union
- Royal London Staff Association

The NFIW merged with the rival National Amalgamated Union of Life Insurance Workers in 1964, forming the National Union of Insurance Workers.

== General Secretaries ==
1919: J. P. Hutchings
1929: F. D. W. Ross
1941: P. W. Auton and A. Kennard
1945: P. W. Auton and A. Barnett
1947: P. W. Auton
1959: Thomas Scrafton
