= National Society of Operative Printers and Assistants =

1889–1982 British trade union

NATSOPA
- National Society of Operative Printers and Assistants
- Merged into: Society of Graphical and Allied Trades
- Founded: 1889
- Dissolved: 1982
- Headquarters: Caxton House, Borough Road, London
- Location: United Kingdom
- Members: 20,877 (1946); 54,464 (1980)
- Key people: George Isaacs, Richard Briginshaw
- Publication: NATSOPA Journal and Graphic Review
- Affiliations: TUC, P&KTF, Labour

The National Society of Operative Printers and Assistants (NATSOPA) was a British trade union.

== History ==
Formed as part of the New Unionism movement in September 1889, the union was originally named the Printers' Labourers' Union and was led by George Evans. In 1899, it was renamed the Operative Printers' Assistants Union, and in 1904 it became the National Society of Operative Printers' Assistants, taking the acronym NATSOPA for the first time. In 1911, it assumed its long-term name, the "National Society of Operative Printers and Assistants". By this point, it had 4,722 members, and it grew rapidly, having 25,000 members in 92 branches by 1929.

In 1966, the union merged with the National Union of Printing, Bookbinding and Paper Workers, becoming Division 1 of the Society of Graphical and Allied Trades (SOGAT), but in 1970 the failure to agree a common rulebook led to Division 1 leaving to become the National Society of Operative Printers and Media Personnel. In 1972, it merged with the Sign and Display Trade Union, and in 1982 it again merged with SOGAT, on this occasion the merger proving successful.

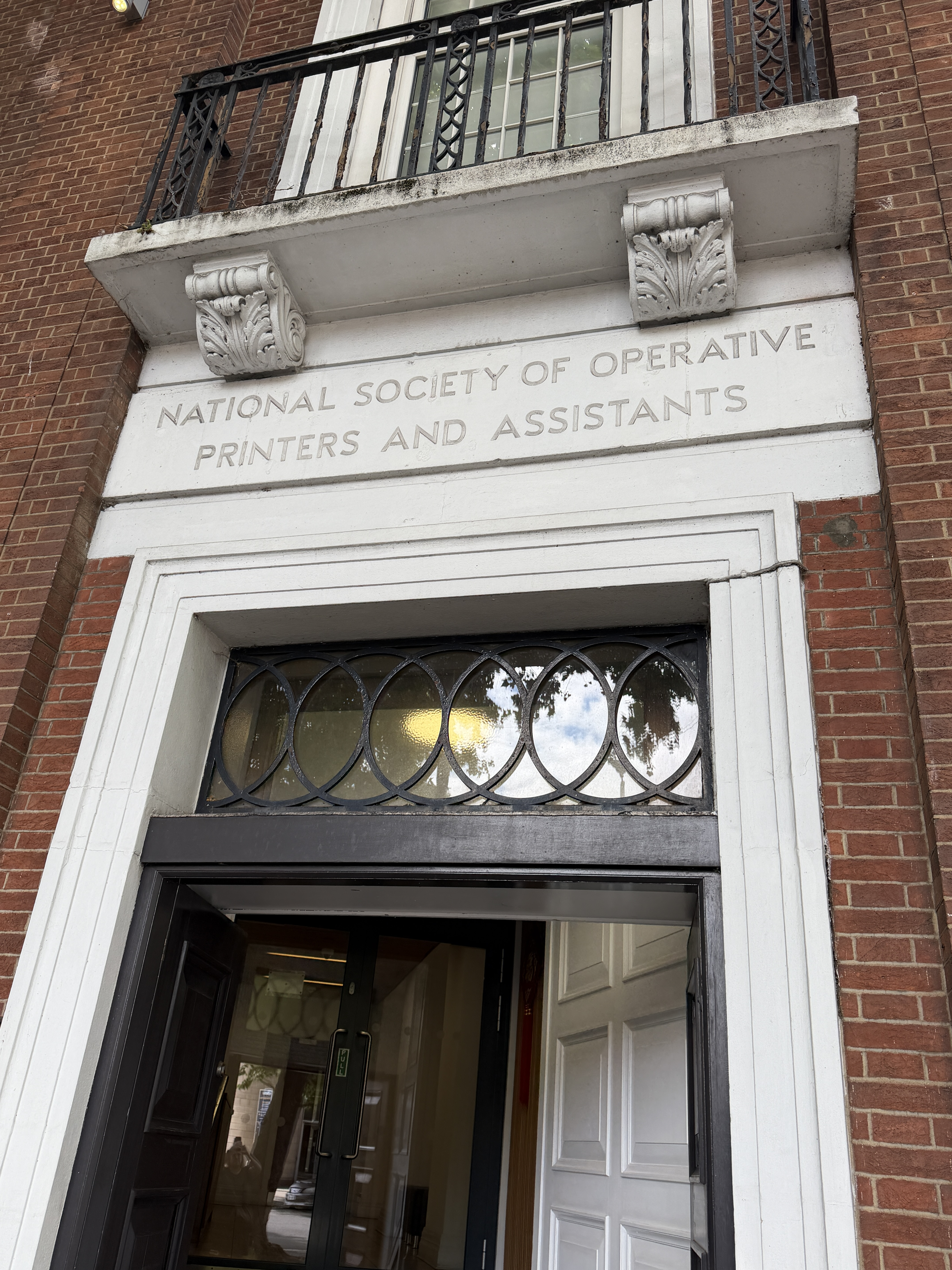
Signage on Caxton House on Borough Road, London SE1.

== Election results ==
The union sponsored George Isaacs as a Labour Party candidate in each general election and two by-elections between 1918 and 1955.

Election	Constituency	Candidate	Votes	Percentage	Position
1918 general election	Southwark North	George Isaacs	2,027	22.4	3
1922 general election	Gravesend	George Isaacs	7,180	35.6	2
1923 general election	Gravesend	George Isaacs	9,776	43.4	1
1924 general election	Gravesend	George Isaacs	10,969	41.6	2
1927 by-election	Southwark North	George Isaacs	6,167	36.9	2
1929 general election	Southwark North	George Isaacs	9,660	45.8	1
1931 general election	Southwark North	George Isaacs	7,053	35.1	2
1935 general election	Southwark North	George Isaacs	8,007	49.8	2
1939 by-election	Southwark North	George Isaacs	5,815	57.4	1
1945 general election	Southwark North	George Isaacs	5,943	69.0	1
1950 general election	Southwark	George Isaacs	35,049	68.3	1
1951 general election	Southwark	George Isaacs	36,586	72.3	1
1955 general election	Southwark	George Isaacs	28,174	70.3	1

== Leadership ==
=== General Secretaries ===
1889: George Evans
1890: Thomas O'Grady
1897: Michael Vaughan
1898: Eddie Smith
1909: George Isaacs
1948: Harry Good
1951: Richard Briginshaw
1975: Owen O'Brien

=== Presidents ===
1889: James Keep
1891: Frederick Quinn
1893: James Keep
1898: Eddie Smith
1899: Harry Cook
1901: J. B. Sullivan
1904: George Cullen
1905: J. B. Sullivan
1907: James Keep
1910: A. Bispham
1917: J. C. Mead
1920: George T. Bevan
1929: William Plunkett
