= Society of Graphical and Allied Trades =

Former trade union of the United Kingdom

- Predecessor: National Union of Printing, Bookbinding and Paper Workers; National Society of Operative Printers and Assistants
- Merged into: Graphical, Paper and Media Union
- Founded: 1966
- Dissolved: 1991
- Headquarters: SOGAT House, London Road, Hadleigh, Essex
- Location: United Kingdom
- Members: 205,784 (1980)
- Publication: SOGAT Journal
- Affiliations: TUC, Labour

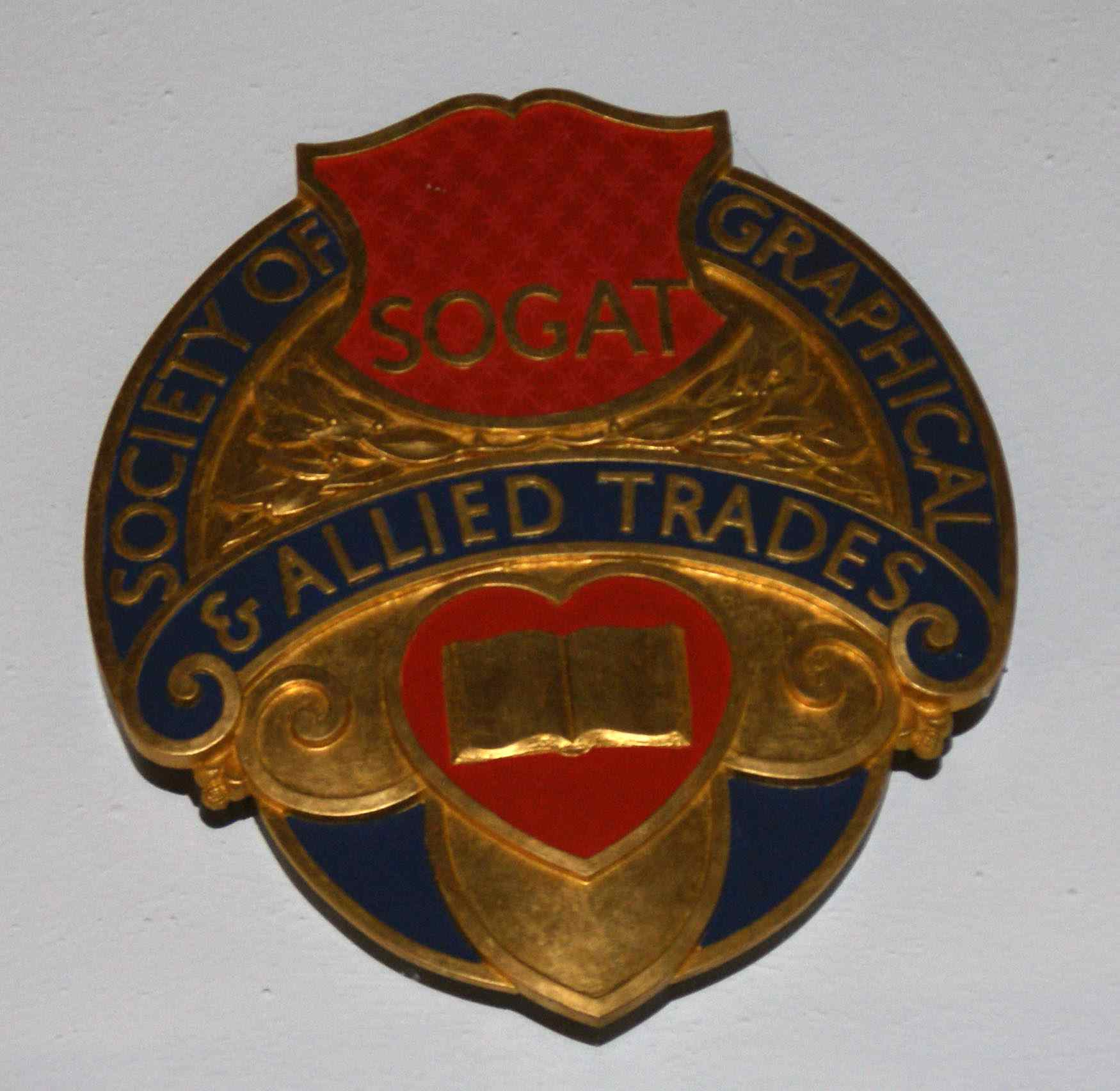
The SOGAT crest

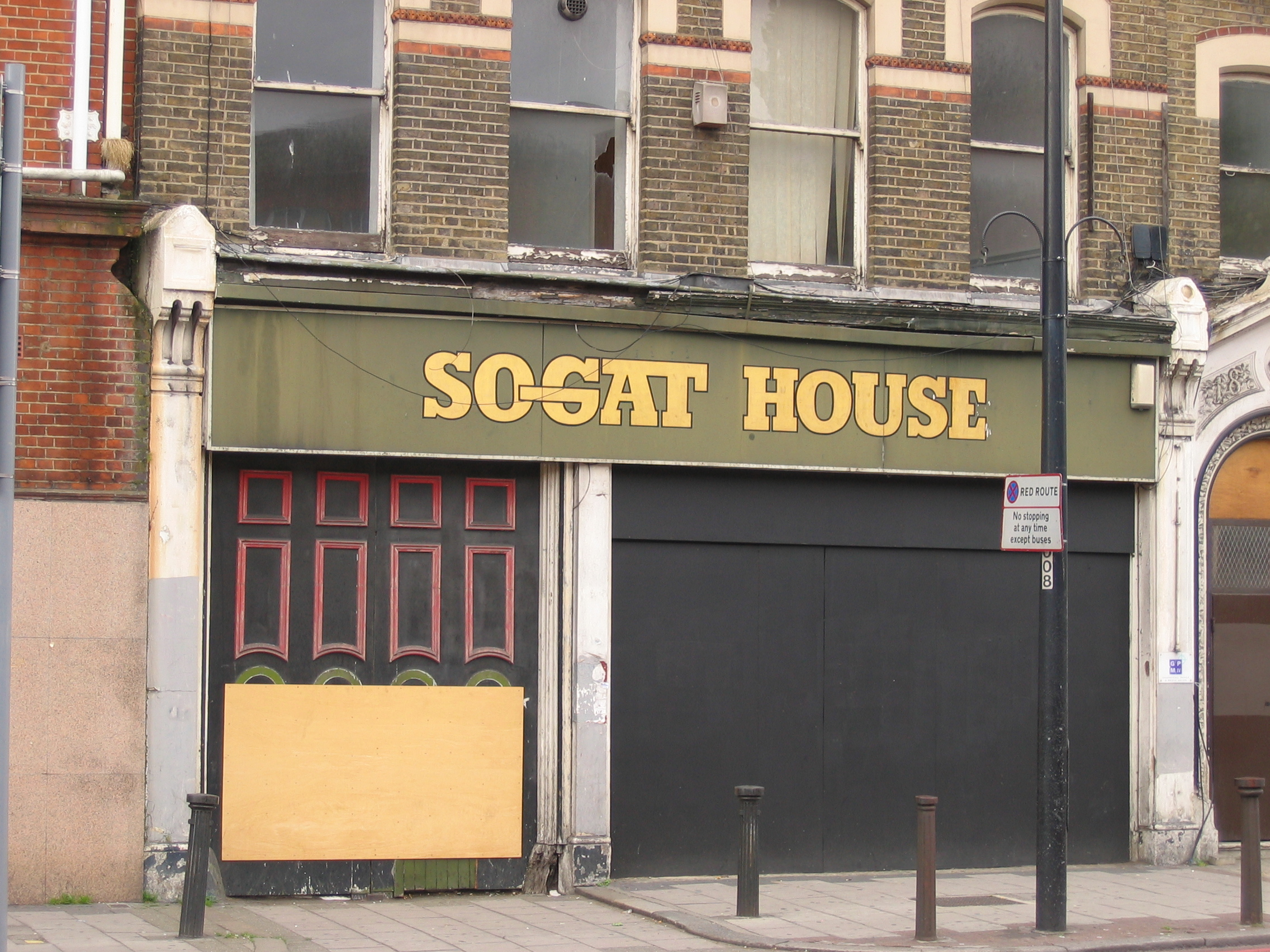
The former SOGAT House at Oval, London. Photo taken July 2007.

The Society of Graphical and Allied Trades (SOGAT) was a British trade union in the printing industry.

== History ==
SOGAT was formed in 1966 by the National Union of Printing, Bookbinding and Paper Workers and the National Society of Operative Printers and Assistants (NATSOPA). The National Union of Printing, Bookbinding and Paper Workers became the Society of Graphical and Allied Trades Division A and NATSOPA became the Society of Graphical and Allied Trades Division 1. The aim was to achieve a complete merger over time, but differences led to in-fighting and in 1970 the two divisions split, Division A retaining the name Society of Graphical and Allied Trades and Division 1 becoming the National Society of Operative Printers, Graphical and Media Personnel (but retaining the NATSOPA acronym).

In 1975, SOGAT officially became the Society of Graphical and Allied Trades 1975 (SOGAT '75) after amalgamation with the Scottish Graphical Association. In 1982, SOGAT '75 and NATSOPA finally amalgamated to become the Society of Graphical and Allied Trades 1982 (SOGAT '82). In 1991, SOGAT '82 merged with the National Graphical Association to form the Graphical, Paper and Media Union, which subsequently merged with Amicus to become that union's Graphical, Paper and Media industrial sector.

== Election results ==
The union did not initially sponsor Parliamentary candidates, but shortly after the 1979 general election, it changed its policy. It sponsored Bob Litherland's successful candidacy in the 1979 Manchester Central by-election, and also began sponsoring Ron Leighton, who was already a sitting Member of Parliament.

Election	Constituency	Candidate	Votes	Percentage	Position
1979 by-election	Manchester Central	Bob Litherland	7,494	70.7	1
1983 general election	Manchester Central	Bob Litherland	27,353	65.3	1
1983 general election	Newham North East	Ron Leighton	19,282	49.7	1
1987 general election	Manchester Central	Bob Litherland	27,428	68.2	1
1987 general election	Newham North East	Ron Leighton	20,220	51.9	1

== General Secretaries ==
1966: Tom Smith
1970: Vincent Flynn
1975: Bill Keys
1982: Bill Keys and Owen O'Brien
1985: Brenda Dean

== Presidents ==
1966: John McKenzie
1967: Vincent Flynn
1970: Bill Keys
1975: Albert Powell
1983: Brenda Dean
1985: Danny Sergeant
