= National Graphical Association =

1964–1991 trade union in the UK

- Merged into: Graphical, Paper and Media Union
- Founded: 1964
- Dissolved: 1991
- Headquarters: Graphic House, Bromham Road, Bedford
- Location: United Kingdom
- Members: 136,300 (1982)
- Key people: Robert Willis, Tony Dubbins
- Publication: Print
- Affiliations: TUC, P&KTF, Labour Party

The National Graphical Association (NGA) was a trade union representing typographers and related workers in the United Kingdom.

== History ==
The union was formed in 1964 by the merger of two long-term rival unions, the Typographical Association and the London Typographical Society. It was joined by a large number of small craft print unions including the National Society of Electrotypers and Stereotypers, National Union of Press Telegraphists, Association of Correctors of the Press, Amalgamated Society of Lithographic Printers. Society of Lithographic Artists, Designers and Engravers (SLADE) and National Union of Wallcoverings and Allied Trades. By 1982 it had a membership of 136,300.

In 1978 the General Secretary Joe Wade asserted in a letter to the Sunday Times that "recruitment through secondary boycott has been a legitimate trade union tactic for many years."

The NGA merged with the Society of Graphical and Allied Trades in 1991 to form the Graphical, Paper and Media Union.

== Election results ==
The union sponsored several Parliamentary candidates, many of whom won election.

Election	Constituency	Candidate	Votes	Percentage	Position
1964 general election	Bristol South	William Wilkins	26,569	63.5	1
1966 general election	Billericay	Eric Moonman	40,013	46.5	1
1966 general election	Bristol South	William Wilkins	26,552	67.1	1
1970 general election	Billericay	Eric Moonman	43,765	47.8	2
Feb 1974 general election	Basildon	Eric Moonman	33,499	45.2	1
Oct 1974 general election	Basildon	Eric Moonman	32,298	47.9	1
1979 general election	Basildon	Eric Moonman	32,739	40.5	2
1983 general election	Colchester North	Ray Allen	10,397	18.4	3
1987 general election	Clackmannan	Martin O'Neill	20,317	53.7	1

== Leadership ==
=== General Secretaries ===
1964: Robert Willis and John Bonfield
1969: John Bonfield
1976: Joe Wade
1982: John Jackson and Joe Wade
1984: Tony Dubbins

=== General Presidents ===
1964: Fred Simmons
1974: Les Dixon
1982: Bryn Griffiths
