= Typographical Association =

Former trade union of the United Kingdom

- Predecessor: National Typographical Association
- Merged into: National Graphical Association
- Founded: 1848
- Dissolved: 1964
- Headquarters: Beechwood, Oak Drive, Fallowfield, Manchester
- Location(s): United Kingdom and Ireland
- Members: 38,277 (1939)
- Publication: Typographical Circular
- Affiliations: TUC, ITUC, P&KTF, IGF, Labour

The Typographical Association (TA) was a trade union representing typographers in the United Kingdom and Ireland.

== History ==
The National Typographical Association collapsed in 1848, and delegates from across Yorkshire and Lancashire met at Angel Street in Sheffield to found the Provincial Typographical Association, intended to recreate the former Northern Typographical Union and to focus on paying benefits to members on strike. The union grew gradually from 481 members at the end of 1849 to 5,300 in 1877. In that year, it merged with a related relief association and dropped "Provincial" from its title.

Based in Manchester, the union focussed on demanding members serve a seven-year apprenticeship. In 1894, it began admitting women. In the 1910s, the Association established a branch in London, but the Trades Union Congress instituted arbitration which restricted it from a fifteen-mile radius of central London, the rival London Society of Compositors having rights to organise in the city.

By 1946, membership had reached 13,958. In 1964, the Association merged with the London Typographical Society to create the National Graphical Association.

== Election results ==
The union sponsored Labour Party candidates in several Parliamentary elections, many of whom won election.

Election	Constituency	Candidate	Votes	Percentage	Position
1906 general election	Norwich	George Henry Roberts	11,059	37.5	1
1910 Jan general election	Norwich	George Henry Roberts	11,159	28.7	2
1910 Dec general election	Norwich	George Henry Roberts	10,003	35.8	2
1917 by-election	Norwich	George Henry Roberts	unopposed	N/A	1
1918 general election	West Bromwich	Frederick Roberts	11,572	54.0	1
1922 general election	Buckingham	Owen Connellan	7,343	26.3	2
1922 general election	West Bromwich	Frederick Roberts	14,210	50.6	1
1923 general election	West Bromwich	Frederick Roberts	12,910	44.8	1
1924 general election	West Bromwich	Frederick Roberts	15,384	51.6	1
1929 general election	West Bromwich	Frederick Roberts	19,621	52.1	1
1931 general election	West Bromwich	Frederick Roberts	17,204	44.4	2
1935 general election	Blackburn	George Henry Walker	34,423	23.8	4
1935 general election	West Bromwich	Frederick Roberts	19,113	51.3	1
1945 general election	Bristol South	William Wilkins	24,929	58.8	1
1945 general election	Rossendale	George Henry Walker	15,741	43.6	1
1950 general election	Bristol South	William Wilkins	23,456	59.9	1
1950 general election	Woodford	Seymour Hills	18,740	30.0	2
1951 general election	Bristol South	William Wilkins	24,444	63.3	1
1955 general election	Bristol South	William Wilkins	24,954	64.1	1
1959 general election	Bristol South	William Wilkins	27,010	60.8	1

In both the 1910 elections, Roberts was elected by taking second place in a two-seat constituency.

== Leadership ==
=== General Secretaries ===
1849: Josephus Speak
1865: Henry Roberts
1869: Henry Slatter
1897: Richard Hackett
1900: A. W. Jones
1900: Herbert Skinner
1934: John Fletcher
1942: Harry Riding
1955: F. C. Blackburn
1957: John Bonfield

=== General Presidents ===
1852: William Dronfield
1855:
1886: Owen Connellan
1888: Daniel Bird
1889:
1891: Richard Hackett
1892:
1893: Richard Hackett
1897:
1899: O. Waddington
1902: H. Matthewman
1908: John H. Boothman
1913: Jimmy French
1934: Hugh Inglis
1949: F. C. Blackburn
1955: John Bonfield
1957: Fred Simmons
