= London Society of Compositors =

Former trade union of the United Kingdom

- Predecessor: London Trade Society of Compositors; London General Trade Society of Compositors
- Merged into: National Graphical Association
- Founded: 1834
- Dissolved: 1964
- Headquarters: 7-9 St Bride Street, London
- Location: England
- Members: 12,387 (1907)
- Publication: London Typographical Journal
- Affiliations: TUC

The London Society of Compositors was a British trade union, representing print workers in London.

== History ==
The union was founded as the London Union of Compositors in 1834 by the merger of the London Trade Society of Compositors and the London General Trade Society of Compositors. The following year, it was joined by the News Society of Compositors. In 1845, the union was officially dissolved, its members designating it the South Eastern District of the National Typographical Association. The national organisation collapsed, and the London group re-established itself as the "London Society of Compositors".

The union had a membership of over 10,000 by 1910, and attempted to expand outside London, but the Trades Union Congress instituted arbitration which limited it to a fifteen-mile radius of central London, the Typographical Association having rights to organise in the remainder of England.

In 1955, the Society merged with the Printing Machine Managers' Trade Society and was renamed the London Typographical Society. In 1964, it merged with the Typographical Association to form the National Graphical Association.

== Election results ==
The union sponsored Labour Party candidates in several Parliamentary elections, many of whom won election.

Election	Constituency	Candidate	Votes	Percentage	Position
1906 general election	Deptford	C. W. Bowerman	6,236	52.2	1
1910 Jan general election	Deptford	C. W. Bowerman	6,880	52.0	1
1910 Dec general election	Deptford	C. W. Bowerman	6,357	51.4	1
1918 general election	Deptford	C. W. Bowerman	14,073	54.4	1
1918 general election	Southwark South East	Thomas Naylor	2,718	27.4	2
1921 by-election	Southwark South East	Thomas Naylor	6,561	57.0	1
1922 general election	Deptford	C. W. Bowerman	18,512	52.6	1
1922 general election	Southwark South East	Thomas Naylor	7,734	43.6	2
1923 general election	Deptford	C. W. Bowerman	21,576	63.0	1
1923 general election	Southwark South East	Thomas Naylor	9,374	54.3	1
1924 general election	Deptford	C. W. Bowerman	21,903	54.5	1
1924 general election	Southwark South East	Thomas Naylor	11,635	54.3	1
1929 general election	Deptford	C. W. Bowerman	26,848	55.2	1
1929 general election	Southwark South East	Thomas Naylor	13,527	60.4	1
1931 general election	Deptford	C. W. Bowerman	22,244	45.6	2
1931 general election	Southwark South East	Thomas Naylor	9,678	46.7	2
1935 general election	Islington South	William Cluse	12,526	52.4	1
1935 general election	Southwark South East	Thomas Naylor	11,942	63.2	1
1945 general election	Islington South	William Cluse	12,893	72.5	1
1945 general election	Southwark South East	Thomas Naylor	9,599	76.9	1

== General Secretaries ==
- 1848: Edward Edwards
- 1850: John Boyett
- 1854: William Cox
- 1857: William Beckett
- 1863: Henry Self
- 1881: C. J. Drummond
- 1892: C. W. Bowerman
- 1906: Thomas Naylor
- 1938: Alfred M. Wall
- 1945: Robert Willis
- 1955: Robert Willis and Percy Astins
- 1956: Robert Willis
