= Walter Green (politician) =

British politician (1878–1958)

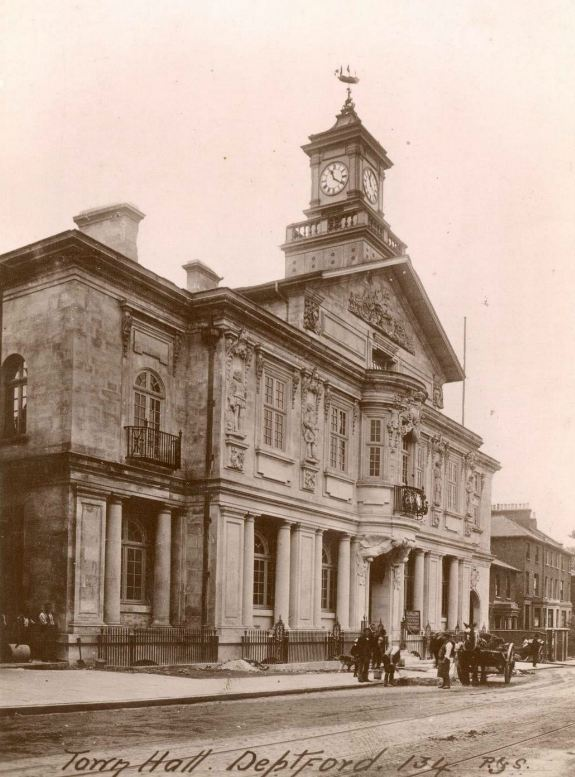
Deptford Town Hall c.1910, about the time that Walter Green became a town councillor

Walter Henry Green CBE, (1878 – 13 April 1958) was a British Labour and Co-operative politician for Deptford, elected in 1935 and MP until 1945. He became a councillor in Deptford in 1909, its mayor 1920–1922, and in 1944 became the first freeman of the borough. Later he became a member of the Metropolitan Water Board 1946–1953, and was appointed the C.B.E. Order of the British Empire in 1949.

== Mayor of Deptford ==
Between 1920–1922, he was Mayor of Deptford. As part of his duties, on 22 March 1921, he unveiled the First World War memorial.

== Members of Parliament 1935–1945 ==
Walter Green was elected Member of Parliament in the 1935 General Election, in which he gained the seat for Labour, with a majority of 6,892 (14.62%) over Conservative Prospective parliamentary candidate, Sir Malcolm Campbell, the then land and water speed record holder.

== Royal Arsenal Co-operative Society chairman ==
Between 1935–1947, he was Political Secretary of the Royal Arsenal Co-operative Society, the only Co-operative Society to be affiliated to the Labour Party nationally.

== Labour Party Chairman ==
Between 1941–42 he was chairman of the Labour Party.

== Personal ==
He married Grace Edith Puddlefoot in 1904, and together had a son and a daughter.

Parliament of the United Kingdom
Preceded by Denis Hanley	Member of Parliament for Deptford; 1935–1945	Succeeded by John Wilmot
Civic offices
Preceded by William Wayland	Mayor of Deptford; 1920–1922	Succeeded by Joseph Tiffen
Party political offices
Preceded by Thomas Williams	Socialist societies representative of the Labour Party National Executive Committee; 1935–1946	Succeeded by Joseph Reeves
Preceded by James Walker	Chair of the Labour Party; 1942–1943	Succeeded by Alfred Dobbs
