= Maurice Alexander (barrister) =

Canadian lawyer and soldier

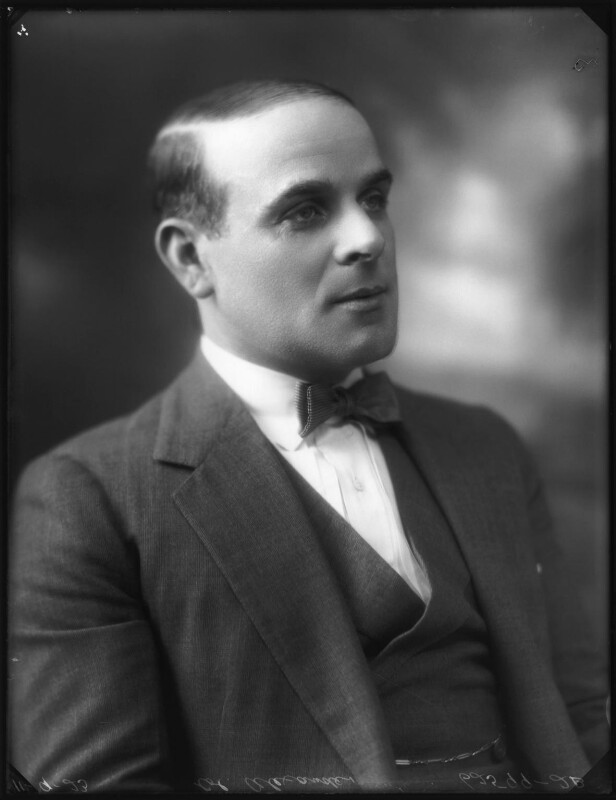

Member of the British Parliament for Southwark South East
- In office 15 November 1922 – 6 December 1923
- Monarch: George V
- Prime Minister: David Lloyd George; Bonar Law
- Preceded by: Thomas Ellis Naylor
- Succeeded by: Thomas Ellis Naylor

Personal details
- Born: 24 December 1889 Canada
- Died: 17 June 1945 (aged 55) Westminster, London, England
- Party: National Liberal, Labour, National Government
- Education: McGill University
- Occupation: Lawyer, diplomatic service, & military officer

Maurice Alexander, CMG, KC (24 December 1889 – 16 July 1945) was a Canadian barrister and soldier who later moved to England and had careers in the Diplomatic Service, English law and politics.

== Family and education ==
Maurice Alexander was born into a Jewish family, the son of L G Alexander JP. He was educated at McGill University in Montreal, where he was a Gold Medallist of the Literary Society. He obtained BA and BCL degrees.

== Career ==
Alexander went in for the law. He was called to the bar of Quebec in 1910 and became a member of the firm of Davidson, Wainwright, Alexander and Elder barristers of Montreal.

In 1911, he was commissioned as a lieutenant of the Canadian Grenadier Guards, rising to the rank of lieutenant-colonel by 1916. He served in the European theatre from 1914 to 1917 as a member of the Canadian Expeditionary Force. In 1916 he was appointed to the post of Deputy Judge Advocate-General, and stepped up to the full role in 1917. He was mentioned in despatches and in 1917 he won the CMG.

In 1918 he entered the service of the Overseas Department of the Foreign Office and acted as First Secretary at the British Embassy in Washington from 1919 to 1920. He returned to the United Kingdom to practice law and was called to English Bar at the Middle Temple in 1920 and was appointed to North Eastern Circuit. In 1922 he was appointed King's Counsel by the government of Canada.

Alexander also had private business interests. He was a director of the Elkington Co., Ltd, of Birmingham and London.

== Politics ==
=== 1922 ===
Alexander was on the left. He began his political career as a National Liberal, i.e. as a member of that wing of the Liberal Party which supported the Coalition Government 1916-1922 of Prime Minister David Lloyd George. In December 1921 there had been a by-election in Southwark South East, which had resulted in the capture of the seat from the Coalition Liberals by Labour. The defeated Liberal candidate, T. O. Jacobsen, decided not to contest the seat again at the 1922 general election and Alexander stepped into the breach, gaining it back for the Liberals in a straight fight with Labour's successful by-election candidate Thomas Ellis Naylor, winning with a majority of 2,280 votes.

=== 1923 ===
The next general election followed quickly in 1923, on the issue of whether to reintroduce or 'reform' tariffs, and following Bonar Law's death. By this time, the Lloyd George National/Coalition Liberals had reunited with the Independent Liberals, led by former Prime Minister H. H. Asquith. In Southwark South East, Alexander, standing as a Liberal (without the prefix) had another straight fight with Naylor. Although the 1923 general election was largely successful for the reunited Liberals, bringing it 30% of the popular vote and 158 seats, this was almost entirely at the expense of the Conservatives in rural and suburban seats. The story against Labour in working class and industrial seats was very different. Alexander lost his seat to Naylor by a majority of 1,490 votes.

=== 1924 ===
The 1923 general election brought to power the first Labour government, and the Liberal Party in Parliament found itself divided over whether to support it. During the short life of the government, the Liberals were badly split on key votes, presenting a picture of disunity and political incoherence to the electorate. At the 1924 general election, Alexander decided to cut his ties with Southwark, and stood instead as a Liberal candidate in North Norfolk. This was the seat of Noel Buxton, a former Liberal who had defected to Labour. Alexander came a poor third in the contest, losing his deposit.

=== 1929–1931 ===
Alexander did not contest the 1929 general election, apparently reverting to his law practice in London, but in 1931, perhaps influenced by his defeat by Buxton, he surfaced as the Labour candidate in Newcastle upon Tyne East. However, in a straight fight with the sitting MP, the Liberal National, Sir Robert Aske, he lost by the wide margin of 10,346 votes.

=== National candidate ===
Alexander did not contest any further Parliamentary elections, but in 1938, it was reported that he was likely to be selected as the candidate of the National Government in the constituency of Bermondsey West, in opposition to the sitting Labour MP, Alfred Salter. The intervention of the Second World War meant that the general election due to be held by 1940 was postponed, and Alexander did not get to contest Bermondsey. It is not clear when or why he lost faith with the Labour Party, or why he should have been drawn to Sir John Simon's Liberal Nationals.

== Death ==
Alexander died suddenly at his flat at Chesterfield House, South Audley Street, Mayfair, aged 55 years.

Parliament of the United Kingdom
Preceded by Thomas Ellis Naylor	Member of Parliament for Southwark South East; 1922 – 1923	Succeeded by Thomas Ellis Naylor
