= James Dawes =

James Dawes may refer to:

- James Dawes (British politician) (1866–1921), British solicitor and politician
- James W. Dawes (1845–1918), state senator and sixth governor of Nebraska
