= David Carnegie (scientist) =

British scientist, engineer and Liberal Party politician

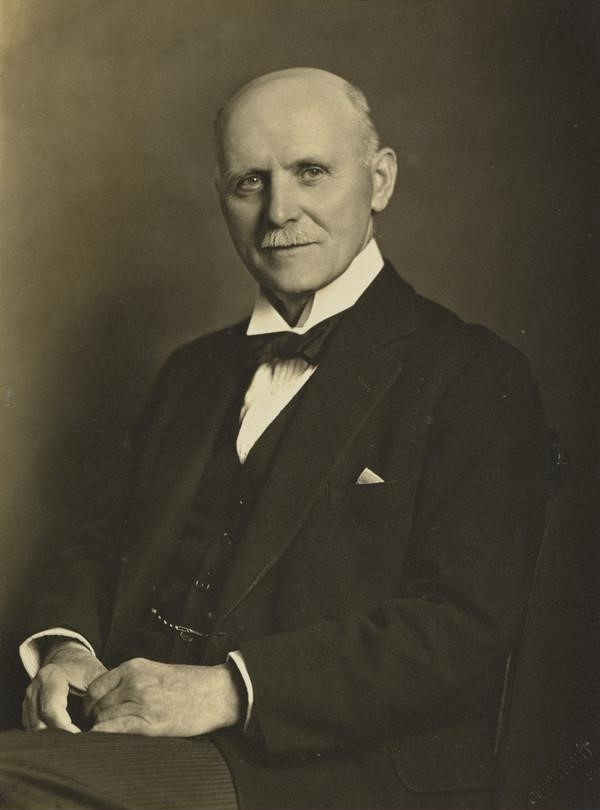
- Portrait by Edward Drummond Young (courtesy Scottish National Portrait Gallery)
- Born: 15 February 1868; Aberdeen, Scotland
- Died: 14 March 1949 (aged 81); Seasalter, Kent
- Education: Gordon's College, Aberdeen; Royal College of Science, London
- Occupation: Engineer
- Spouse: Frances Ellen Lloyd (m. 1896)
- Parent(s): David Carnegie; Margaret Bogue

Col. David Carnegie CBE, FRSE, MInstCE, MInstME, JP (15 February 1868 – 14 March 1949), was a British scientist, engineer and Liberal Party politician who worked for the Canadian government.

== Background ==
He was the son of David Carnegie and Margaret Bogue of Aberdeen. He was educated at Gordon's College, Aberdeen and at the Royal College of Science, London. In 1896, he married Frances Ellen Lloyd of Leicester, and they had three sons.

Carnegie was a member of the Institution of Civil Engineers and the Institution of Mechanical Engineers, and was elected an Ordinary Fellow of the Royal Society of Edinburgh in 1910.

== Engineering career ==
Before World War I, Carnegie worked at the Royal Laboratory of the Royal Arsenal at Woolwich, and later at Samuel Osborn & Company in Sheffield and Carnegie Brothers and Company in London. In 1916, he was described as "a consulting engineer of high standing".

In September 1914 he was appointed as Ordnance Adviser to the Shell Committee in Canada, on which he also sat as a member. When the Committee was replaced by the Imperial Munitions Board in December 1915, he was appointed as one of its members, and continued to serve as such until 1919. In 1915 he was appointed by the Canadian Government to chair a Commission to inquire into the feasibility of refining zinc and copper in Canada, and he also conducted an inquiry into what coke oven capacity existed in Canada for the production of toluol (a key component of trinitrotoluene). He was Chairman of the Inventions Committee in Canada. He was appointed an Honorary Lieutenant-Colonel of the Canadian Militia in 1915, and became an Honorary Colonel in 1916, on his appointment as Consulting Technical Ordnance Adviser to the Department of Militia and Defence.

== Public service ==
At the end of the War he returned to the UK and settled at Seasalter in Whitstable, Kent, but returned in 1919 as a delegate to the National Industrial Conference in Ottawa, where he spoke about the UK experience in establishing the Whitley Councils. In 1920 he was made a Commander of the Order of the British Empire.

In 1922 he was appointed to substitute for Minister of Labour James Murdock at that year's meetings of the International Labour Conference. He was a Canadian employers' representative to the International Labour Organization who was also named by the ILO to sit on the Temporary Mixed Commission for the Reduction of Armaments at the League of Nations from 1921–24.

Carnegie took a particular interest in international affairs through the League of Nations Union which was formed in 1918. In 1925 he was elected a member of its executive committee, on which he remained for the next nine years. He was also interested in serving the local community and was a Justice of the peace.

== Political career ==
He was the Liberal candidate for the Canterbury division of Kent—in which his Whitstable residence was located—at the 1924 General Election. It was a safe Unionist seat that had not elected a Liberal since 1868.

1924 General Election: Canterbury
Party	Candidate	Votes	%	±%
Unionist	Ronald McNeill	16,693	70.3	+11.9
Liberal	David Carnegie	7,061	29.7	−11.9
Majority		9,632	40.6	+23.8
Turnout		23,754	65.9	+9.4
Registered electors		36,045		
Unionist hold		Swing	+11.9	

In November 1927 he was again Liberal candidate for the 1927 Canterbury by-election.

1927 Canterbury by-election
Party	Candidate	Votes	%	±%
Unionist	William Wayland	13,657	57.3	−13.0
Liberal	David Carnegie	10,175	42.7	+13.0
Majority		3,482	14.6	−26.0
Turnout		23,832	60.8	−5.1
Unionist hold		Swing	-13.0	

He was Liberal candidate for the third time at Canterbury for the 1929 general election.

1929 General Election: Canterbury
Party	Candidate	Votes	%	±%
Unionist	William Wayland	19,181	56.7	−0.6
Liberal	David Carnegie	9,937	29.4	−13.3
Labour	P S Eastman	4,703	13.9	n/a
Majority		9,244	27.3	+12.7
Turnout		33,821	68.3	
Unionist hold		Swing	+6.3	

He did not stand for parliament again.

== Bibliography ==
He published a number of works:

- Carnegie, David; Gladwyn, Sidney C. (1920). Liquid steel, its manufacture and cost. London: Longmans, Green and Co. OCLC 39774590.
- Carnegie, David (1920). Can Church and Industry Unite?. London: Marshall Bros. OCLC 150594483.
- — (1925). The History of Munitions Supply in Canada 1914-1918. London: Longmans, Green and Co. OCLC 4673665.
- The Arms Industry, 1936
- — (26 October 1937). The steel sanction: armaments and raw materials (Speech). London: Adam Smith Club. OCLC 931242626.
- World Economics and Peace, 1939
- The International Labour Organization in World Affairs, 1943
- — (1945). Armaments with Security Explained. Aberdeen: Aberdeen University Press. OCLC 236109712.
