= RACS =

RACS may refer to:

- Royal Australasian College of Surgeons
- Royal Arsenal Co-operative Society
