= Owen Jacobsen =

Member of Parliament for Hyde
- Preceded by: Francis Neilson
- Succeeded by: Constituency abolished

Personal details
- Born: Thomas Owen Jacobsen; 23 April 1864
- Died: 15 June 1941 (aged 77)
- Party: Liberal

Thomas Owen Jacobsen (23 April 1864 – 15 June 1941) was a British businessman and Liberal politician. He was born in Richmond Terrace, Liverpool, on 23 April 1864, and was the son of a naturalised Dane. He was a master printer and the senior partner in the stationery company of Jacobsen, Welch and Company, whose paper mills were at Hyde, Cheshire.

In March 1916, Francis Neilson, MP for Hyde, resigned his seat. Jacobsen was chosen as the Liberal candidate and was endorsed by the Asquith led Coalition Government. He was elected at the ensuing by-election. He held the seat until the 1918 general election, when the constituency was abolished. In 1917, he was appointed as private secretary to Leo Chiozza Money, Parliamentary Secretary to the Ministry of Shipping. In 1918, he contested the new seat of Stalybridge and Hyde and was defeated.

Jacobsen was a resident of Brixton in South London and, in 1919, he was elected as a member of the London County Council for Lambeth North. He was part of the Liberal-supported Progressive grouping on the council. In 1921, the MP for Southwark South East resigned and Jacobsen was chosen by the local Liberal Progressive and Radical Association to fight the by-election. He was not opposed by the Conservative Party but refused to describe himself as a Coalition Liberal, but as a "Liberal supporting the Coalition Government". The by-election took place on 14 December 1921 when Jacobsen was heavily defeated by Thomas Naylor, leader of the London Labour Party.

Jacobsen retired from the London County Council in 1922, and stood unsuccessfully for the Liberals at Lambeth Kennington at the 1923 general election. He was going to stand at the 1924 general election but withdrew. The 1929 election was his last electoral contest, when he failed to win the City of London for the Liberals.

Jacobsen retired from politics and was president of the Stationers Association of Great Britain and Ireland from 1929 to 1931. In 1935, the Jacobsen and Welch Company was sold. He died in Worthing, Sussex, in 1941, aged 77.

== Electoral record ==
1916 Hyde by-election
Party	Candidate	Votes	%	±%
Liberal	Owen Jacobsen	4,089	56.0	+4.6
Independent	DP Davies	3,215	44.0	n/a
Majority		874	12.0	+9.2
Turnout			54.7	−34.3
Liberal hold		Swing	n/a	

General election 1918: Stalybridge and Hyde
Party	Candidate	Votes	%	±%
Unionist	John Wood	13,462	51.4	
Labour	Walter Fowden	6,508	24.8	
Liberal	Owen Jacobsen	6,241	23.8	
Majority		6,954	26.6	
Turnout			60.0	
Unionist hold		Swing		

1919 London County Council election: Lambeth North (2 seats)
Party	Candidate	Votes	%	±%
Progressive	Owen Jacobsen	2,656	38.1	
Independent	Rose Emma Lamartine Yates	2,619	37.6	n/a
Municipal Reform	Louis Courtauld	885	12.7	
Municipal Reform	Camac Wilkinson	809	11.6	
Majority		1,734	24.9	
Progressive hold		Swing		
Independent gain from Municipal Reform		Swing	n/a	

1921 Southwark South East by-election
Party	Candidate	Votes	%	±%
Labour	Thomas Naylor	6,561	57.0	29.6
National Liberal	Owen Jacobsen	2,636	22.9	−49.7
Ind. Unionist	Horace Louis Petit Boot	2,307	20.1	n/a
Majority		3,925	34.1	n/a
Turnout		11,504	38.5	−6.7
Labour gain from National Liberal		Swing	39.6	

General election 1923: Kennington
Party	Candidate	Votes	%	±%
Labour	Thomas Williams	8,292	39.2	+3.1
Unionist	Reginald Blair	7,782	36.8	−10.5
Liberal	Owen Jacobsen	5,075	24.0	+7.4
Majority		510	2.4	n/a
Turnout		21,149	57.6	−0.8
Registered electors		36,729		
Labour gain from Unionist		Swing	+6.8	

General election 1929: City of London (2 seats)
Party	Candidate	Votes	%	±%
Unionist	Vansittart Bowater	16,149	43.9	n/a
Unionist	Edward Grenfell	16,092	43.7	n/a
Liberal	Owen Jacobsen	4,579	12.4	n/a
Majority		11,513	31.3	n/a
Turnout		46,469	45.2	n/a
Unionist hold		Swing	n/a	

Parliament of the United Kingdom
Preceded by Francis Neilson	Member of Parliament for Hyde; 1916 – 1918	Constituency abolished
