= Royal Arsenal Co-operative Society =

Former English consumer co-operative

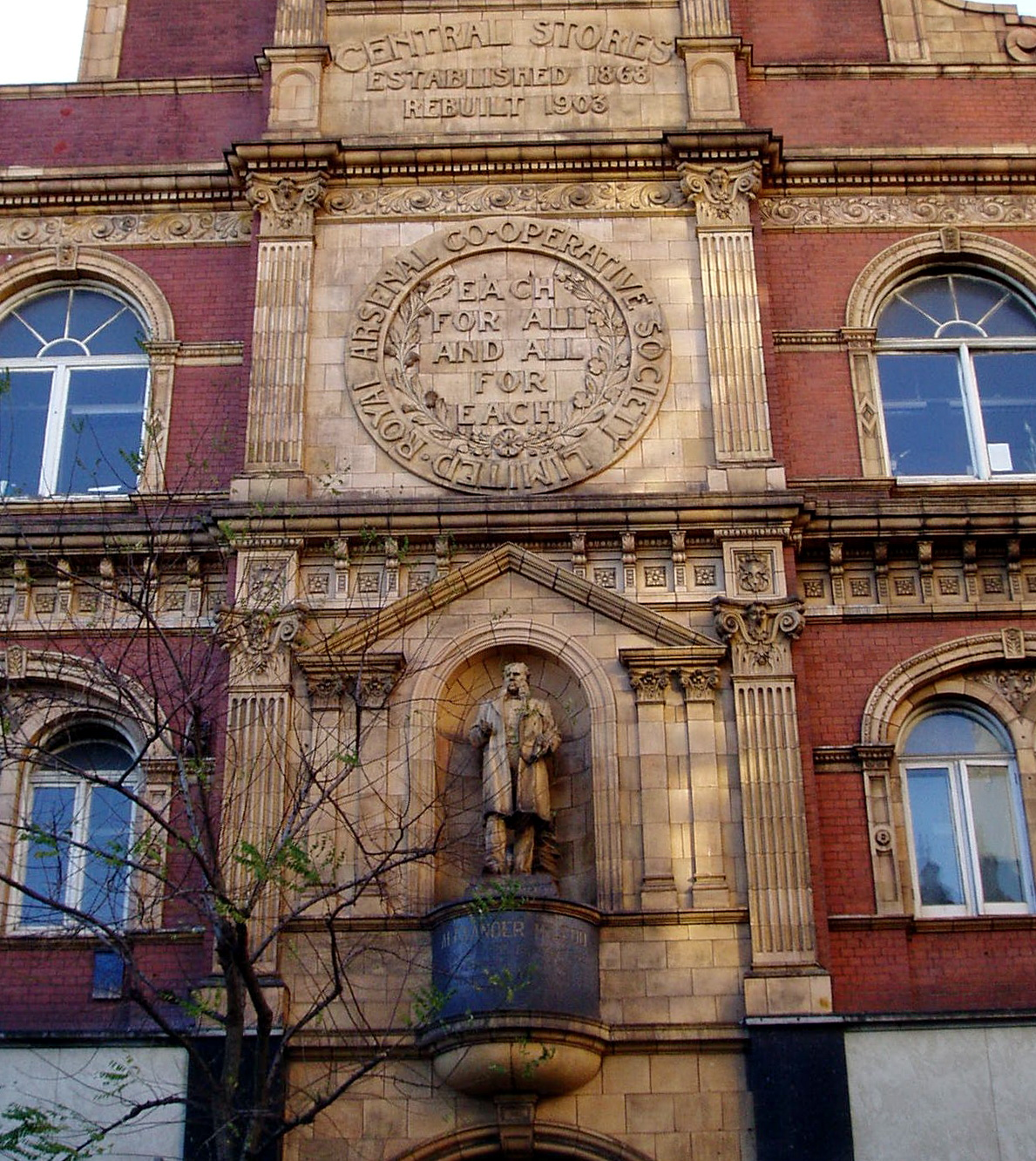
- Detail of Central Stores in Powis Street, Woolwich, with the RACS motto and a statue of Alexander McLeod
- Type: Consumers' co-operative
- Industry: Grocer, wholesale, pharmacy, optician, funeral services, travel agent, real estate, finance, social enterprise, education
- Predecessor: Royal Arsenal Supply Association (1868)
- Founded: 1872; 154 years ago
- Defunct: 1987; 39 years ago
- Fate: Merged with Co-operative Wholesale Society (1985)
- Headquarters: Woolwich, London, United Kingdom
- Area served: South London, Hampshire, Berkshire, Kent, Surrey, Sussex
- Key people: William Rose, Alexander McLeod (founders)
- Revenue: over £60m (1970s)
- Members: c. 500,000

The Royal Arsenal Co-operative Society (RACS) was a large consumer co-operative based in south east London, England. The co-operative took its name from the Royal Arsenal munitions works in Woolwich and its motto was: "Each for all and all for each". In 1985 it merged into the national Co-operative Wholesale Society.

== Establishment and growth ==
Co-operative trading had been rooted in Woolwich and the Royal Arsenal since the mid 18th century. In 1868 the Royal Arsenal Supply Association was established by William Rose (1843–1909?) and Alexander McLeod (1832–1902), consisting of 20 workers from the Royal Arsenal. The first base and store was at Rose's house at 11 Eleanor Road (now Barnard Close). In 1869 Rose was laid off at the Arsenal and emigrated to Canada (where his son William Oliver Rose became a well-known politician). McLeod took over as secretary and moved the store to Parry Place (Spray Street Quarter). The society adopted the Rochdale Principles of profit-sharing and renamed itself Royal Arsenal Co-operative Society in 1872.

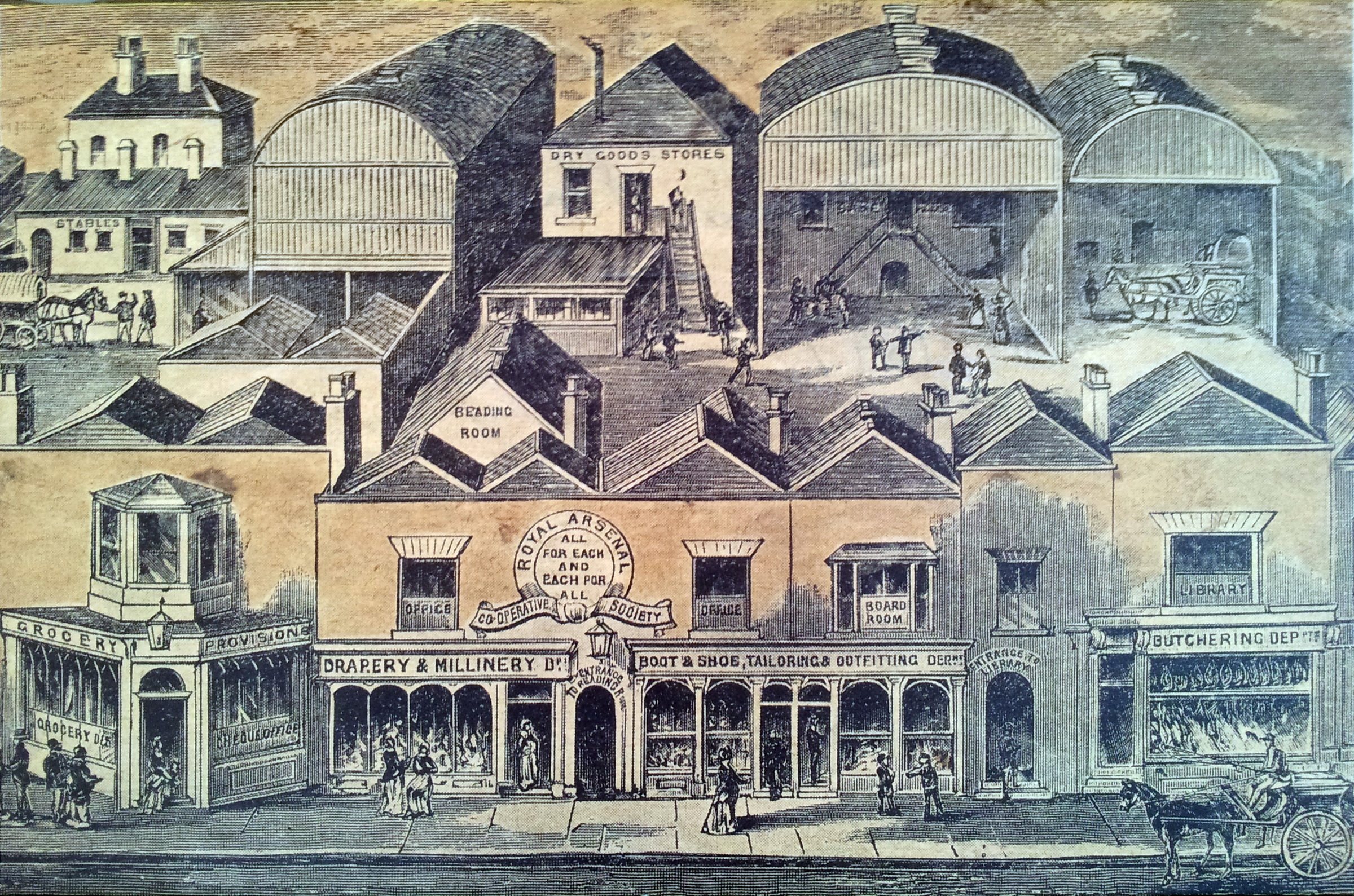
Various RACS stores in Powis Street, Woolwich, 1884

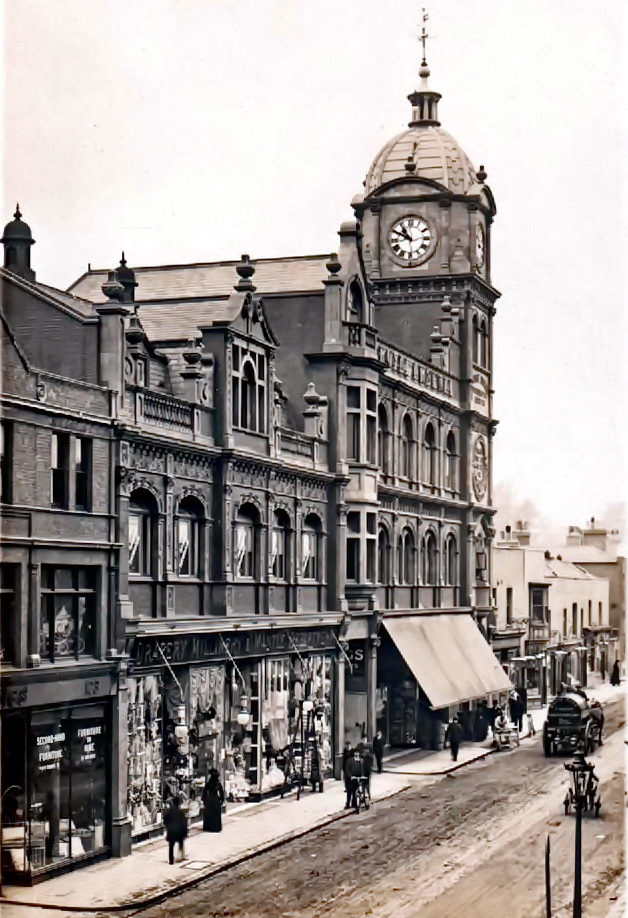
Half-finished Central Stores, Powis Street, Woolwich, 1907

At first, the store was only open four evenings a week and on Saturday afternoon, but this improved after 1873, when the store moved to larger premises in Powis Street, next but one to the house in which the Woolwich Equitable Building Society had been established in 1842. Membership grew from 232 in 1873 to 1,597 in 1879 and 6,721 in 1889. By that time it was the largest co-operative society in London and the 21st largest (of more than 1500) in the country. According to the social reformer Charles Booth, there was "nothing at all like it within the boundaries of London".

In the century that followed, the society's activities expanded from food retail into a huge range of commercial, social and political activities. In 1902 it had over 20,000 members. Shops opened up in areas beyond Woolwich and house-building took place beyond the parish boundaries in Abbey Wood and Eltham. In 1924 membership had surpassed 100,000 and in 1938 this number had quadrupled. At its height (circa 1975), membership had reached 500,000 and sales exceeded £60 million. The society had outlets across most of South London and parts of Hampshire, Berkshire, Kent, Surrey and Sussex.

== Activities ==
=== Retail and services ===
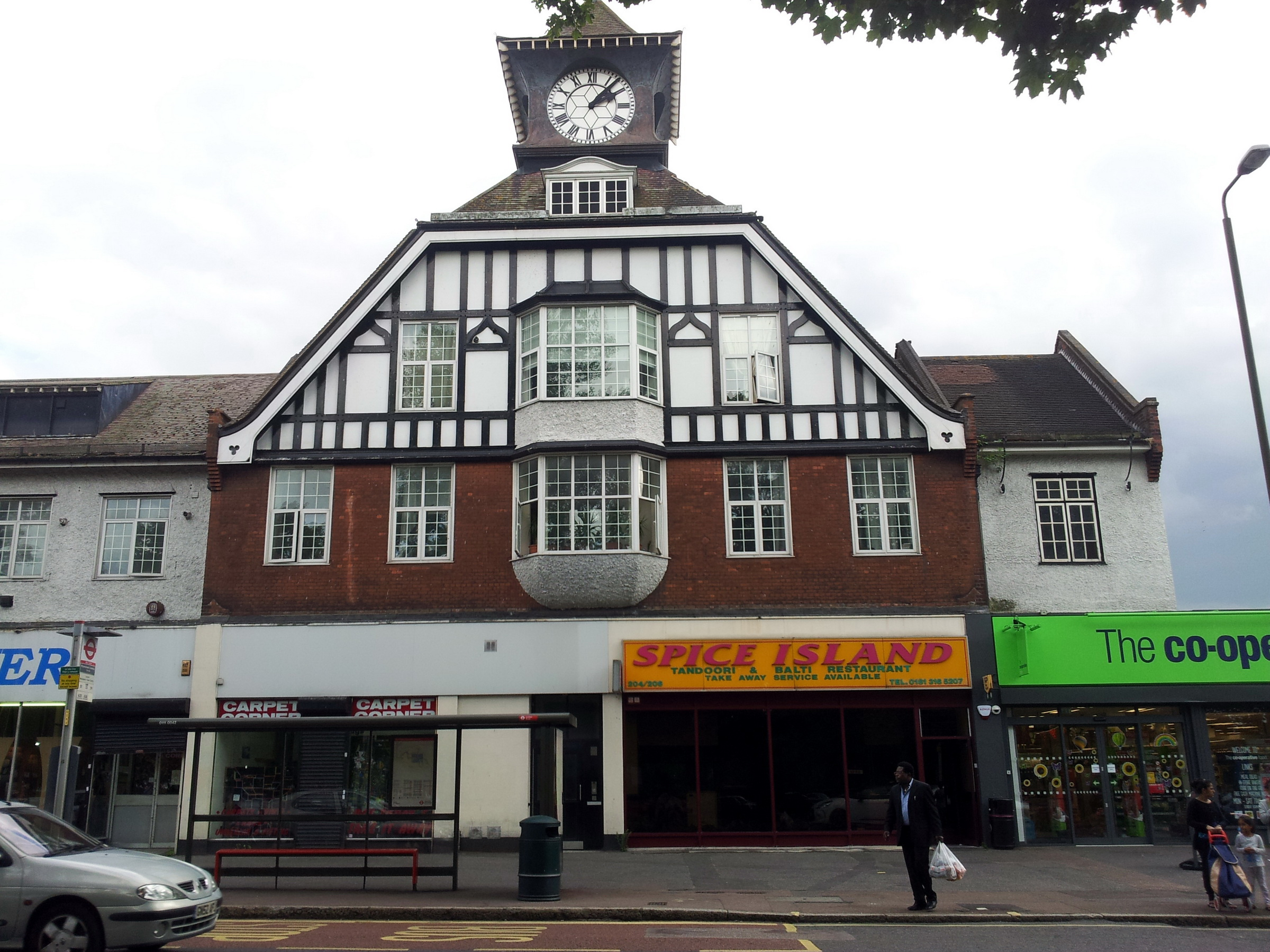
Former RACS store in Plumstead, partly used by a Co-op supermarket

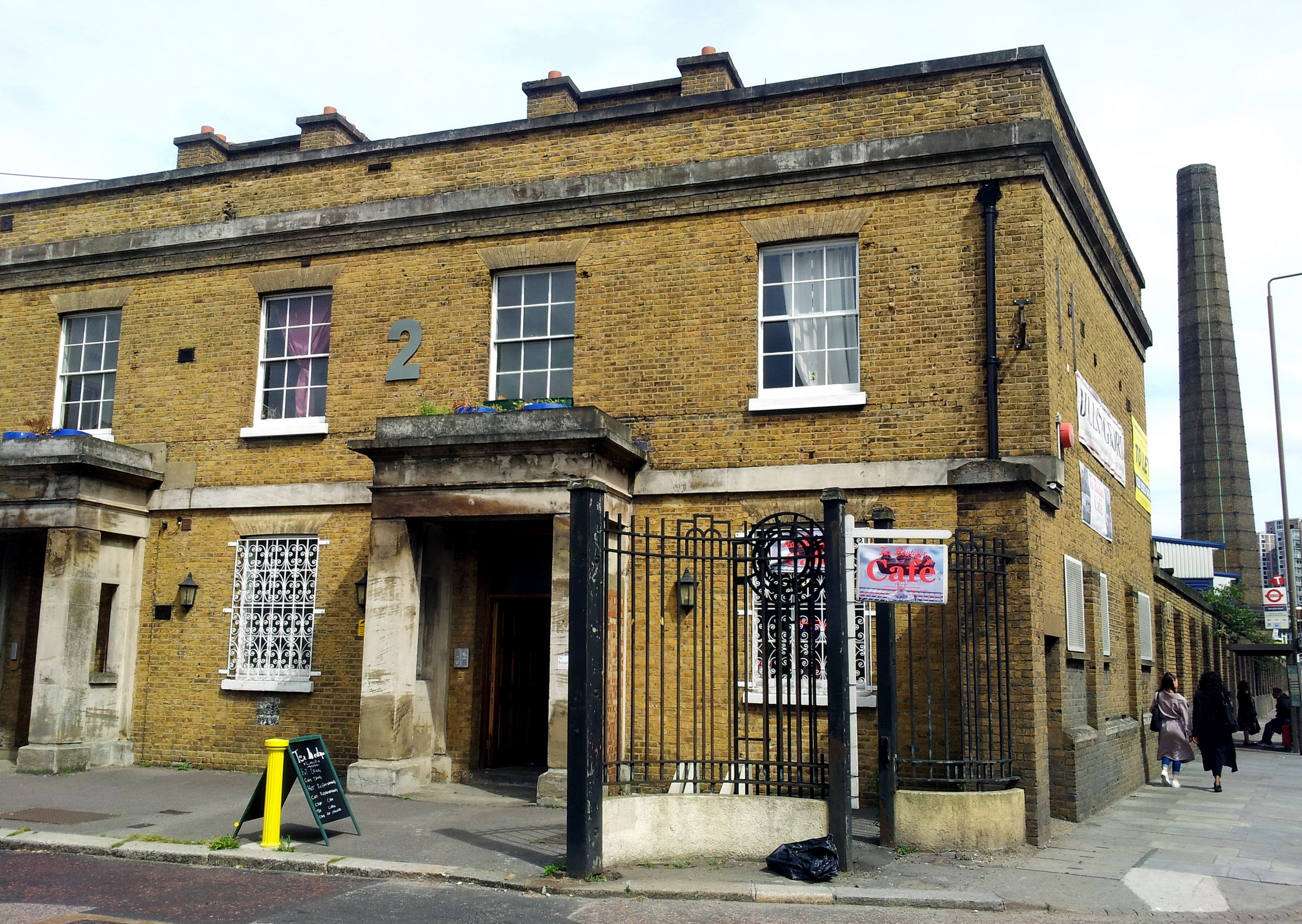
Funeral home (formerly RACS, now Co-op) in Woolwich Dockyard

The RACS ran not just food shops (a founding aim of the UK consumer co-operative movement being the provision of cheap unadulterated food) but also milk, bread and fuel deliveries, department stores, a bookshop, jewellery department, shoe shops and chemists. Other services included removals, catering, undertakers (customers included Herbert Morrison), hairdressers, laundry, a travel agency, insurance and savings clubs. As was usual for such co-operative societies, members were paid a dividend in proportion to their spending with the society – at one point in embossed tin tokens, later by the quoting of a "Divi Number", towards the end by stamps.

=== Production and distribution ===
To support its retail activities the RACS established bakeries, bought farms and piggeries and built food processing factories. It owned stables and railway wagons, an abattoir, dairy, a frozen food plant, a fleet of coaches and two hotels on the Isle of Wight.

=== Social ===
From 1878 onwards 2.5% of the society's profits were spent on education. The RACS had an Education Department, ran classes and sports days, opened reading rooms, supported the Woodcraft Folk and the Co-operative Women's Guild, youth clubs at Falconwood and Coldharbour, a cricket club, orchestras and at one point two choirs conducted by (Sir) Michael Tippett. The society opened its first library in Woolwich in 1879 some 20 years before the local authority provided such a facility.

In July 1888, the society helped Frank Didden raise funds to establish Woolwich Polytechnic, supporting a sports meeting held in Charlton Park. The Polytechnic eventually opened in 1891, also spawning day schools.

=== Housing ===
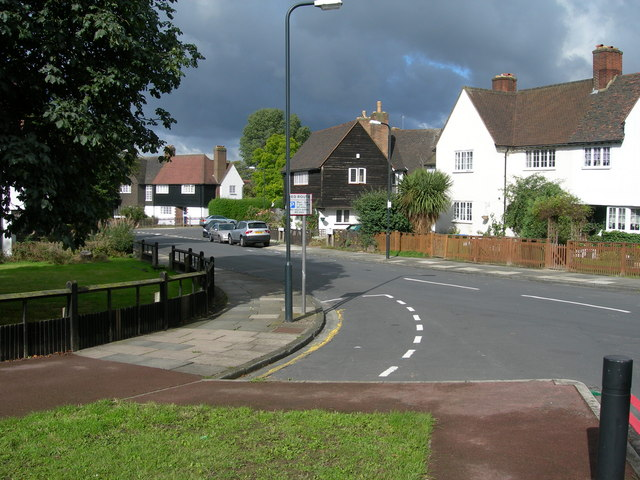
View of Progress Estate, Eltham

In 1900 the RACS became a large-scale housing developer by building the Bostall Estate on its farmland in Abbey Wood – Robert Mackay (chairman of the RACS) and its Works Department led by architect Frank Bethell constructing over a thousand homes between 1900 and 1914. In 1925 the RACS bought the 1250-home Royal Arsenal workers estate at Well Hall in Eltham from the Government, which it then renamed the Progress Estate.

=== Political ===
The RACS was always one of the more political co-operative societies. Its motto was "Each for All and All for Each"; it employed a Political Secretary, published magazines and newspapers (such as Comradeship and The Wheatsheaf) and housed Basque refugees from the Spanish Civil War (see also Milk for Spain). The RACS supported the campaign for working-class political representation (see Labour Representation Committee) and the election of Will Crooks as MP for Woolwich.

In 1929, the RACS affiliated directly to the Labour Party, rather than to the Co-operative Party as was more usual for such societies. It also affiliated to the London Labour Party and various borough and local labour parties. As well as the usual co-op dividend to its customer-members, the RACS also paid a "bonus to labour" – for instance paying the tradesmen building the Bostall Estate a halfpenny an hour above the trade union rate. Overall control of the RACS rested with a full-time Management Committee elected by society members under proportional representation.

The RACS directly sponsored Labour Party candidates in several Parliamentary elections, many of whom were successful.

Election	Constituency	Candidate	Votes	Percentage	Position
1950 general election	Greenwich	Joseph Reeves	29,379	57.9	1
1950 general election	Lewisham West	Arthur Skeffington	21,433	44.7	2
1950 general election	Woolwich West	Henry Berry	21,118	46.3	2
1951 general election	Greenwich	Joseph Reeves	30,326	60.4	1
1955 general election	Greenwich	Joseph Reeves	26,423	58.8	1
1959 general election	Greenwich	Richard Marsh	25.204	56.2	1
1979 general election	Thanet West	J. F. Little	8,576	26.2	2

== Decline and fall ==
By the late 1970s the RACS was in trouble. Greater customer affluence and competition from supermarket chains such as Sainsbury's were changing the society's market – its size and democratic ownership structure made it slow to adapt. Membership numbers declined, weakening the society's democratic basis. Reserves dwindled and dividend payments – for many, the Co-op's unique selling point – all but ceased. In 1985, after a century of expansion in size and scope the RACS avoided collapse by 'transferring its engagements' to the national Co-operative Wholesale Society. Many of the former RACS supermarkets and funeral homes remain as Co-op outlets.

== Legacy ==
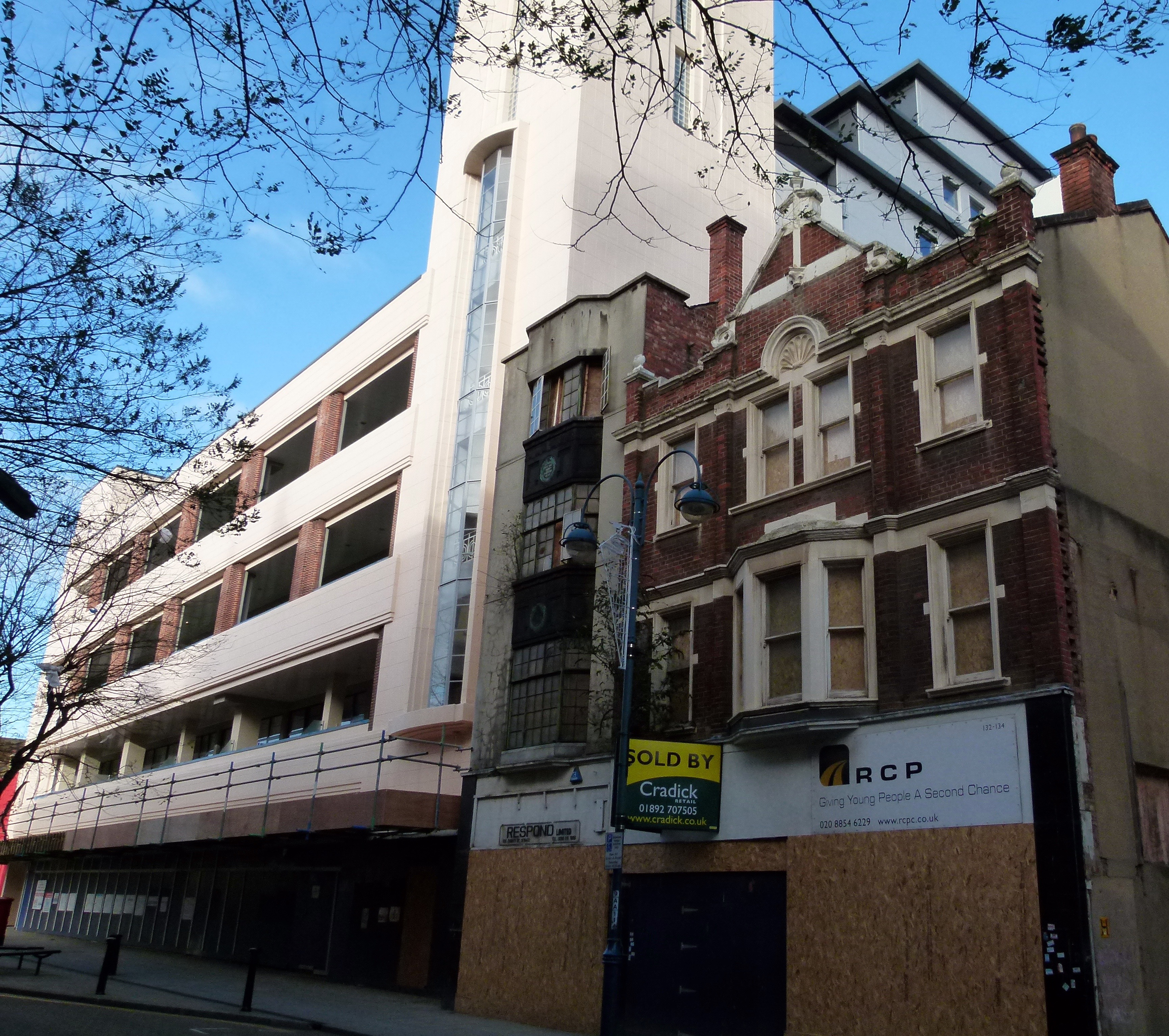
Three former RACS buildings in Powis Street, Woolwich, in 2015. Left: the art deco department store, now an apartment building. Centre and right: funeral home, chemist's and optician's, to be converted into a pub

Some of the former RACS buildings and farms have survived and are protected as cultural heritage. Woodlands Farm Trust in Shooters Hill is a former RACS farm that was threatened by redevelopment in the 1990s and is now run by a community trust.

The two large landmark buildings at the west end of Powis Street in Woolwich are evocative of the co-operative movement that was such a major force in this town. The Neo-Victorian RACS Central Stores (125–153 Powis Street) has an 82 m-long (269 ft) red brick and terracotta façade with a 32 m-high (105 ft) copper-domed clock tower (with a clock by Gillett & Johnston). It was designed by the Society's architect, Frank Bethell, and built in three phases: 1902–03, 1912 and 1926. Above the main entrance is a statue of the founder, Alexander McLeod, by Alfred Drury, and the society's motto. In 2011–13 it was converted into a hotel with 120 rooms and shop units.

The RACS department store (138–152 Powis Street) was built in 1938–1940 in a streamlined Art Deco style. The large, metal-framed windows emphasise the horizontal lines in the faience-tiled gable, set between two end towers. The elegant east tower contains an open stairwell with wrought-iron railings with the letters 'co op' integrated in the design. The west tower is less pronounced and stands over an access road to Mortgramit Square. In 2013-16 it was converted into apartments ("The Emporium"), adding three recessed storeys on top of the restored building.

The former RACS store on Lewisham High Street with a decorative facade has now been converted to flats.

The Bostall Estate in Abbey Wood consists of over one thousand late-Victorian houses. The streets still bear co-operative-themed names, such as Owenite (after Robert Owen), Commonwealth, Rochdale (after the 'Rochdale Pioneers'), McLeod and Will Rose (after founder-members Alexander McLeod and William Rose). The Progress Estate in Well Hall, Eltham, is a housing estate partly developed by Woolwich Borough, partly by RACS. The area was conceived as a garden city and is a conservation area since 1975.

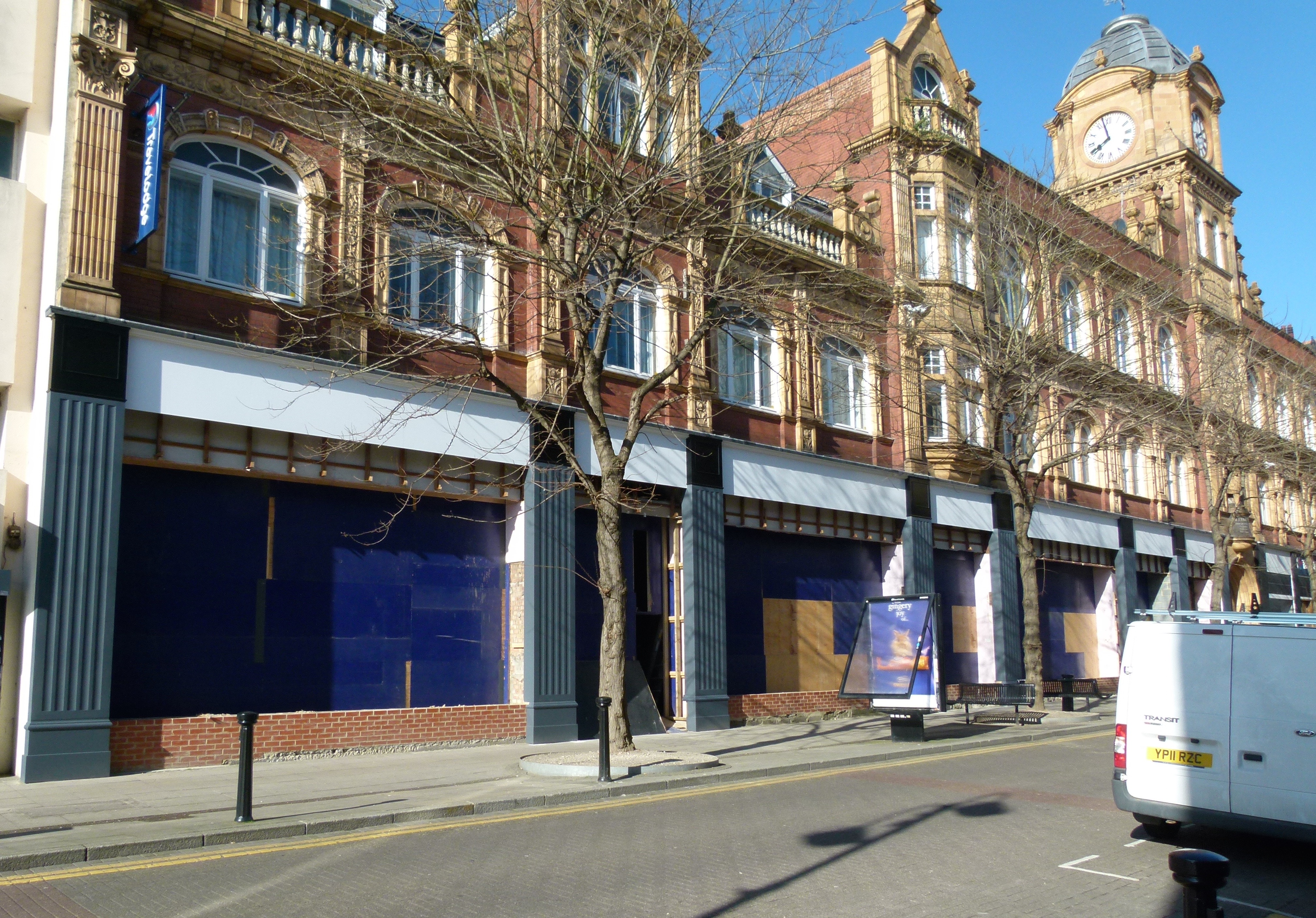
Former RACS Central Stores, Woolwich

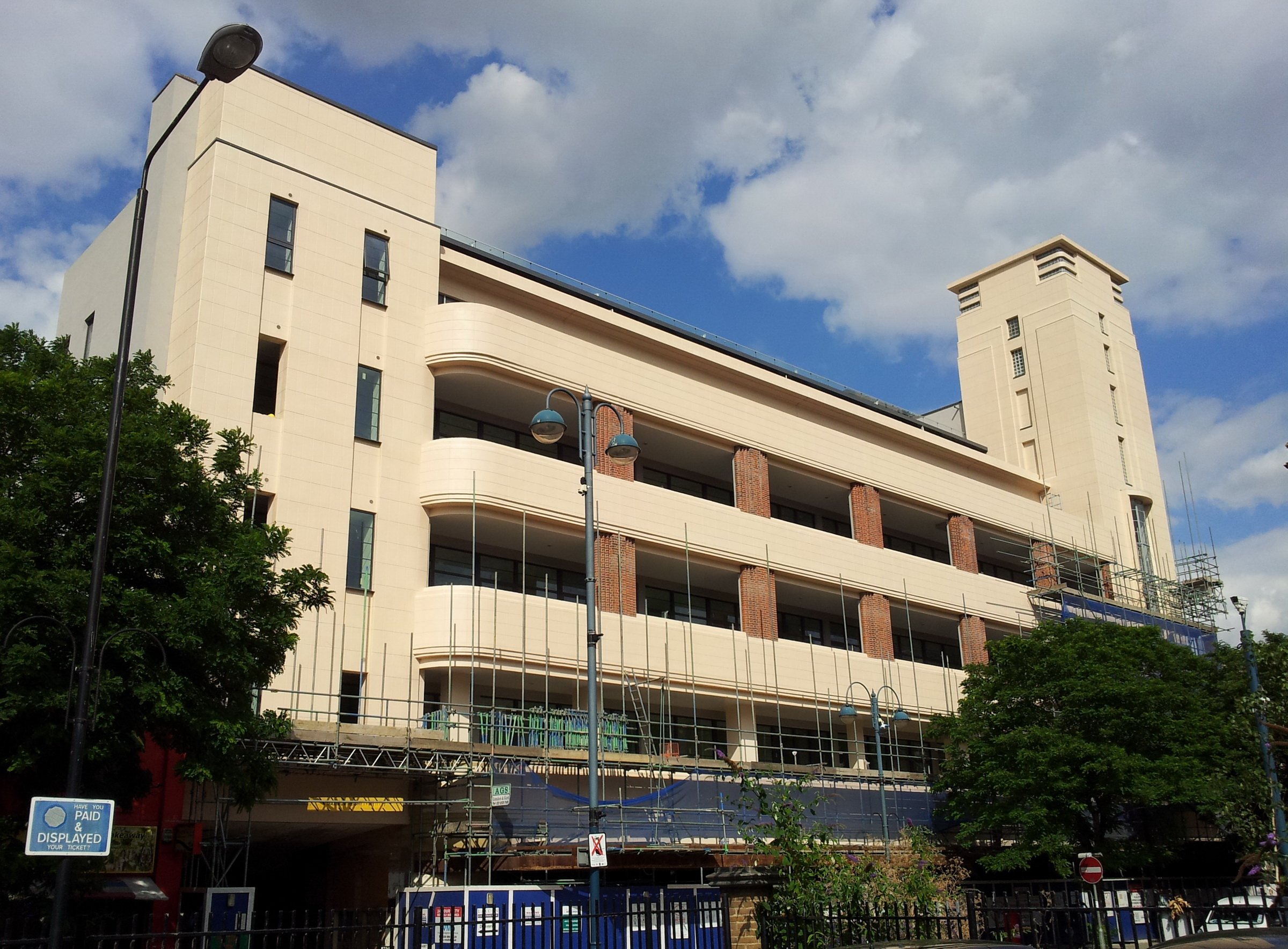
Former RACS department store, Woolwich

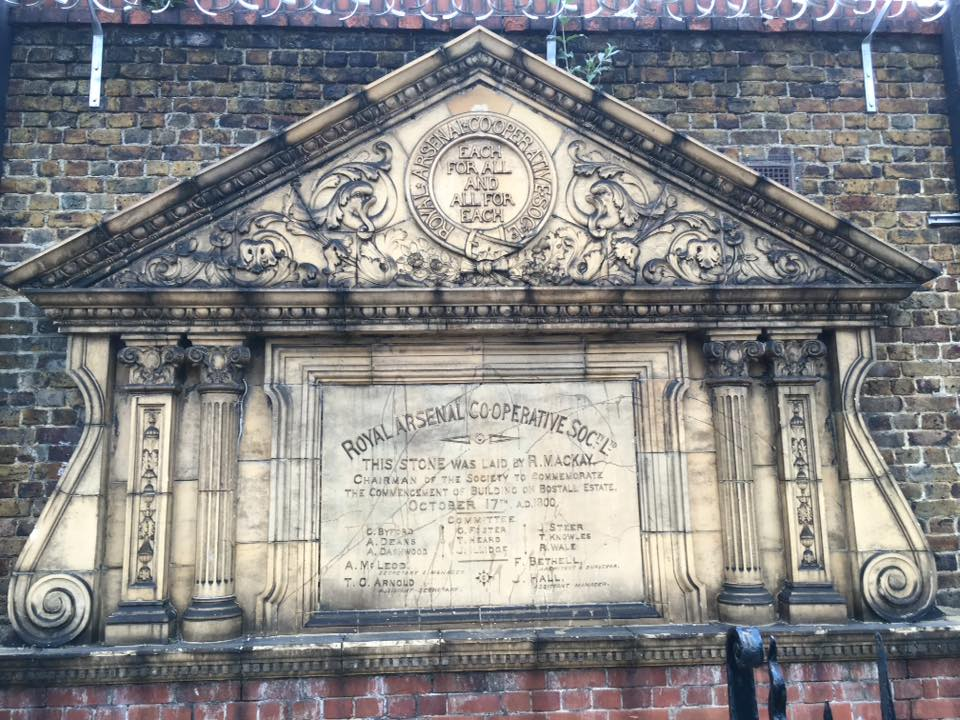
Commemorative stone Bostall Estate, Abbey Wood

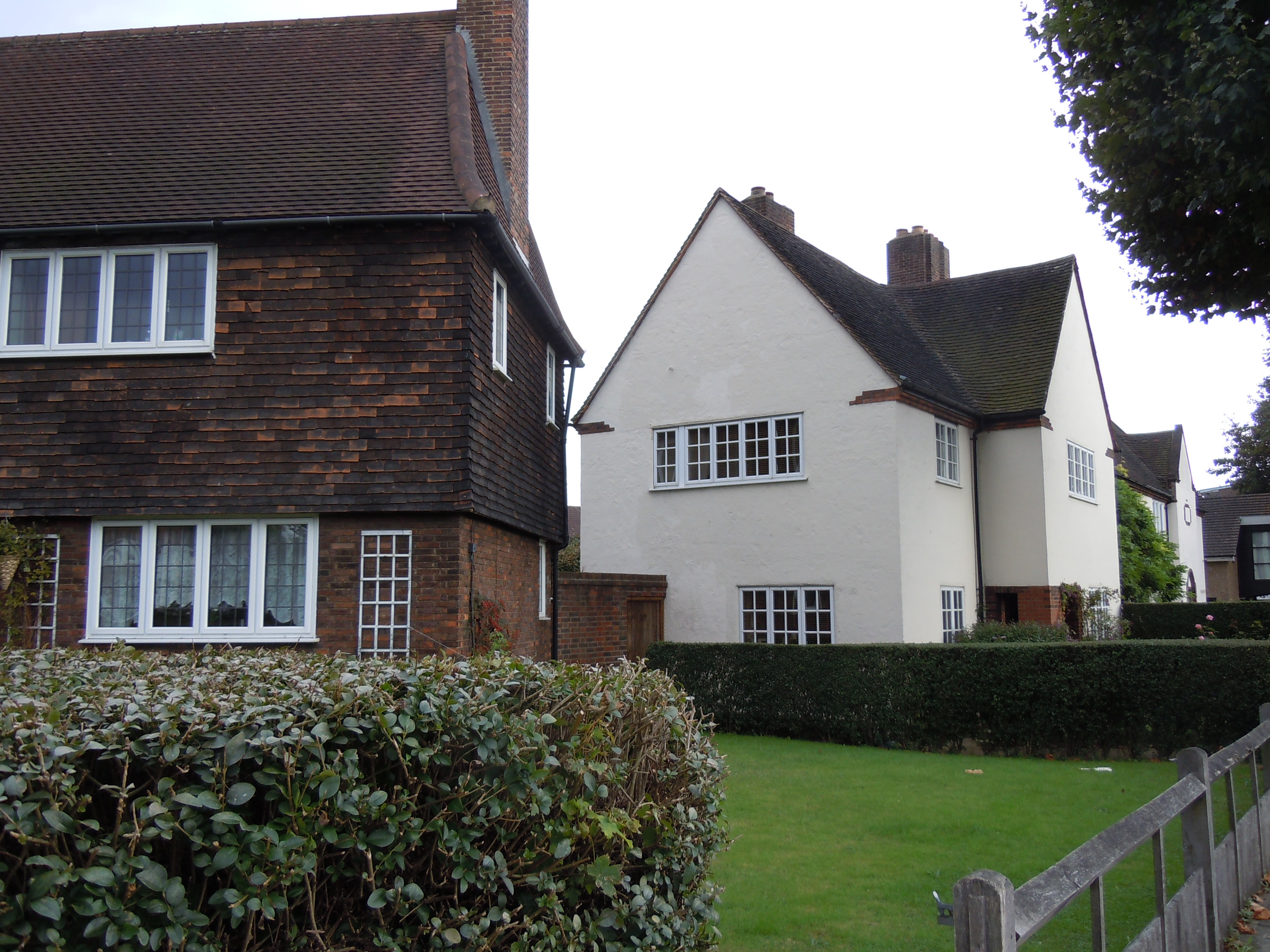
Progress Estate, Eltham

== See also ==
- Royal Arsenal
- Woodlands Farm Trust
- Progress Estate
- Other London-area consumer co-operative societies:
  - Croydon Co-operative Society
  - South Suburban Co-operative Society
  - London Co-operative Society
