= 1916 Hyde by-election =

1916 UK parliamentary by-election

The 1916 Hyde by-election was a Parliamentary by-election. It returned one Member of Parliament (MP) to the House of Commons of the United Kingdom, elected by the first past the post voting system. The by-election was held on 30 March 1916.

== Vacancy ==
Francis Neilson had been Liberal MP for the seat of Hyde since the January 1910 general election. He was a pacifist and had written the anti-war How Diplomats Make War in 1915. He resigned from parliament when his pacifist beliefs conflicted with the First World War.

== Electoral history ==
General election December 1910: Hyde
Party	Candidate	Votes	%	±%
Liberal	Francis Neilson	5,562	51.4	+11.9
Conservative	Tom Smith	5,268	48.6	+9.3
Majority		294	2.8	+2.6
Turnout		10,830	89.0	−4.2
Liberal hold		Swing	+1.3	

== Candidates ==
The Hyde Liberal Association chose Thomas Owen Jacobsen to defend the seat. Fifty-two-year-old Jacobsen was a locally based businessman who was born in Liverpool, and was the son of a naturalised Dane. He was a master printer and the senior partner in the stationery company of Jacobsen, Welch and Company, whose paper mills were at Hyde, Cheshire. In 1914 the Hyde Unionist Association had selected James Leadbitter Knott as their prospective parliamentary candidate in anticipation of a 1914/15 general election. Knott was a son of James Knott a former Conservative MP for Sunderland. When the election was called Knott was on active service. Due to the wartime party truce, the Unionists chose not to oppose the Liberal candidate and Jacobsen was endorsed by the Asquith led Coalition Government. DP Davies came forward as an Independent candidate. Davies was the nominee of the National Union of Attested Married Men, an organisation opposed to the government's policy on conscription.

== Result ==
Jacobsen held the seat for the government;

Jacobsen

1916 Hyde by-election
Party	Candidate	Votes	%	±%
Liberal	Owen Jacobsen	4,089	56.0	+4.5
Independent	DP Davies	3,215	44.0	New
Majority		874	12.0	+9.2
Turnout		7,304	54.7	−34.3
Liberal hold		Swing		

== Aftermath ==
In 1916 the prospective Unionist candidate, Leadbitter Knott was killed in action. Following boundary changes the Hyde constituency was abolished and merged with Unionist held Stalybridge. The Lloyd George led Coalition Government chose not to endorse Jacobsen but his Unionist opponent, the sitting MP for Stalybridge. This helped ensure Jacobsen's defeat;

General election 1918: Stalybridge and Hyde
Party	Candidate	Votes	%	±%
Unionist	John Wood	13,462	51.4	
Labour	Walter Fowden	6,508	24.8	
Liberal	Owen Jacobsen	6,241	23.8	
Majority		6,954	26.6	
Turnout		26,211	60.0	
Unionist win (new seat)				
