= James Bailey (British politician) =

British politician

The Right Honourable Sir James Bailey

Member of Parliament for Walworth
- In office 1895–1906

Personal details
- Born: 10 November 1840 Mattishall, Norfolk, England
- Died: 12 October 1910 (aged 69) 58 Rutland Gate, London, England
- Party: Conservative

Sir James Bailey, JP, DL (10 November 1840 – 12 October 1910) was a British businessman and Conservative politician who served from 1895 to 1906 as Member of Parliament (MP) for Walworth in South London. He was also a successful hotel developer, most notably for establishing the Bailey's Hotel in Kensington, and the founder of a London gentlemen's club, the Constitutional Club. Baileys Irish Cream is named for the hotel that bears his name.

== Early years ==
Bailey was born in 1840 (on 10 or 15 November) in Mattishall, Norfolk. According to the parish register, he was baptized there on 12 March 1843, son of William Bailey, a labourer, and Sarah (née Dunthron). William Bailey was also known to be a farmer of Mill Road (later Kensington House).

He received his education at Dereham Grammar School. Moving to London in 1860 at the age of twenty, he was initially employed as a butler.

== Career ==
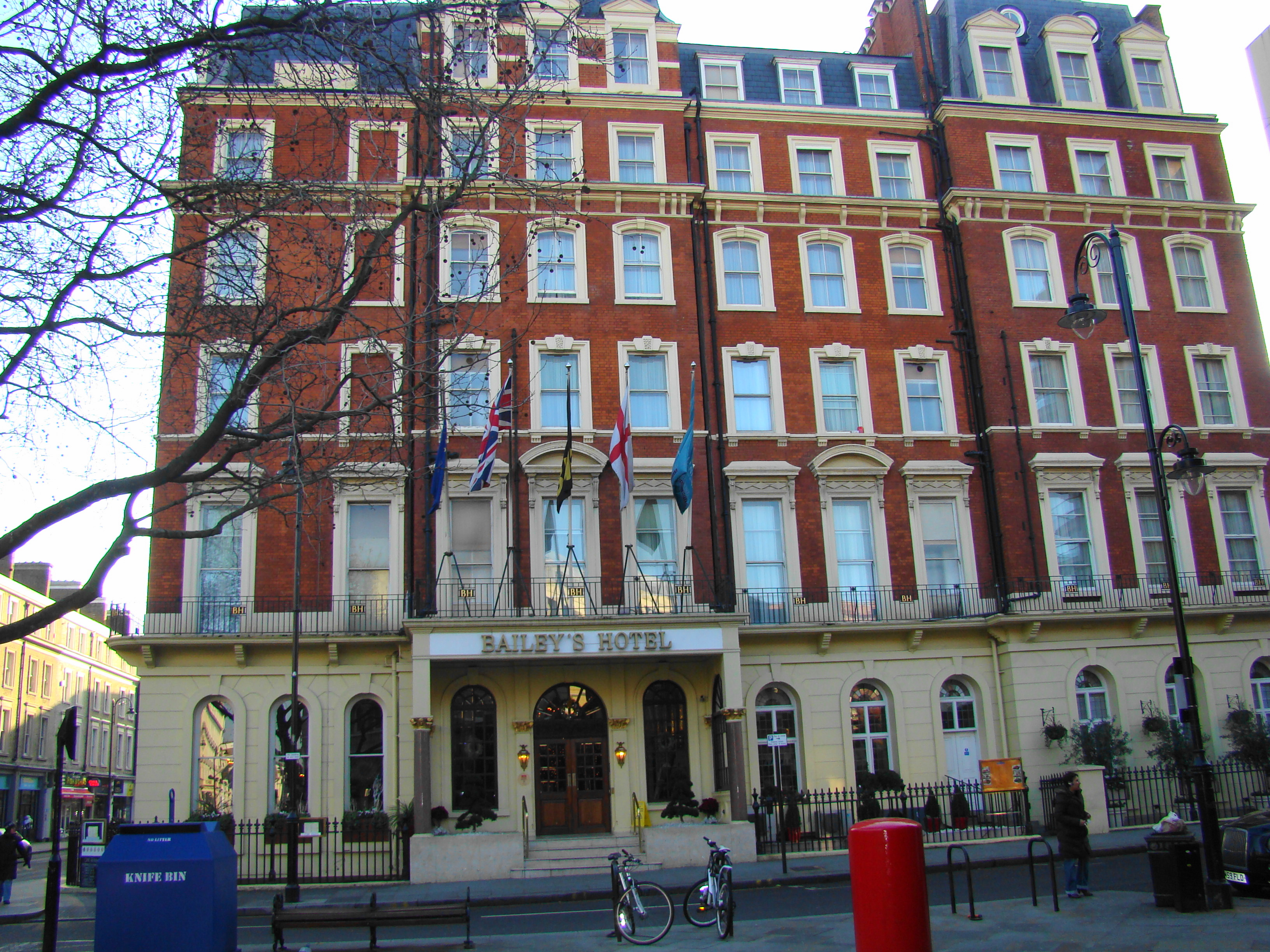
Bailey's Hotel today retains its Victorian style

Bailey's early years in business involved taking a small hotel in Gloucester Road, London, probably the Harrington Hotel, although Bailey's name is not on record. He established the hotel that bears his name in Kensington in 1876, one of the earliest privately funded hotels in London. It was a very modern hotel for this period, with an elevator and bathrooms on every floor. In 1886, he purchased the South Kensington Hotel, located in Queen's Gate Terrace. In 1894, after Bailey sold his hotels to Spiers and Pond Limited, he became managing director, a position he retained until 1898.He served on the boards of Harrods and D. H. Evans, as a Kensington vestryman (town councilor) from 1878 to 1894, as Deputy Lieutenant for Norfolk, and in 1895, Bailey became a Justice of the peace in Essex.

He won his seat in the House of Commons at his first attempt, in a by-election in June 1895 following the death of the Liberal MP William Saunders. One of his two opponents was the Social Democratic Federation candidate George Lansbury, who later became leader of the Labour Party. Bailey was re-elected at the general election in July 1895, and again in 1900, but lost his seat to a Liberal candidate, Charles James O'Donnell, at the 1906 general election and did not stand for Parliament again.

== Personal life ==
Bailey married firstly, in 1869, Catherine Smith (died 1892) of Benson, Oxfordshire; and secondly, in 1896, Lily Fass of Queen's Gate Gardens. He had three sons, Percy James Bailey (Lieut. 12th Royal Lancers), Frederick George Glyn Bailey, Sidney Robert Bailey (Admiral, K.B.E., C.B., D.S.O.; commander Battlecruiser Squadron (United Kingdom) 1934–1936; lived 1882–1942), and three daughters, Alice, Augusta Dunthorne Bailey (1872–1949) who married Vivian Nickalls (1871-1947), and Marie Elizabeth. He had a home in Harrington Gardens, South Kensington, S.W.; and he purchased the 700 acre Shortgrove estate, Newport, Essex in 1894 from Lord Cardross.

Bailey was one of the 1883 founders of the Constitutional Club, a club closely aligned to the Conservative party. He was also a member of two other gentlemen's clubs in London, the Carlton Club, a venue for political discussions between Conservative MPs, and the Junior Carlton Club which was also closely aligned to the Conservative party.

Bailey made time for several interests aside from his hotelier and political career. His hobbies included hunting and shooting; but, while he was a supporter of the Essex hunt, he must not be confused with James David Bailey, its huntsman between 1879 and 1920. Between 1878 and 1894, Bailey was active as a Kensington vestryman and People's Churchwarden. Bailey retained an affinity for his childhood home town, Mattishall, as, in 1894, he donated a church organ to All Saints' Church Mattishall in memory of his mother.

He was knighted on 18 December 1905, and died five years later, aged 69, at his London home, 58 Rutland Gate, leaving an estate valued at £245,000.

Parliament of the United Kingdom
Preceded by William Saunders	Member of Parliament for Walworth; 1895 – 1906	Succeeded by Charles James O'Donnell
