= Alfred M. Wall =

British trade union leader (1889–1957)

Alfred Mervyn Wall (1 November 1889 – 2 October 1957) was a British trade union leader and political activist.

Born in East Hamlet, Shropshire on 1 November 1889, Wall moved to London to work as a compositor, and was a member of the British Socialist Party (BSP). The BSP affiliated to the Labour Party after World War I, and Wall was unexpectedly elected to Wandsworth Metropolitan Borough Council for Clapham North in 1918. In this role, he frequently clashed with the local socialist preacher and pioneer druid George Watson MacGregor-Reid. He was also sympathetic to anarchism, and chaired the Frank Kitz Appeal Committee.

Wall represented the BSP's Clapham branch at the meeting which founded the Communist Party of Great Britain (CPGB), and subsequently sat as a Communist councillor. Initially one of the communist's main speakers in London, he stood as a joint Communist Party-Labour Party candidate in Streatham at the 1924 general election, taking 13.8% of the vote.

Wall represented the London Society of Compositors at the Labour Party conference in 1925, and eventually defected to the party, although he was still a communist in 1927 when he became a joint secretary of the "Hands Off China" campaign. In 1926, he was elected as Secretary of the London Trades Council. While holding this position, he promoted a trade union for actors, based on a closed shop principle. This became Equity, and he was elected to be its first secretary.

During the Spanish Civil War, Wall was vice-president of the Spanish Medical Aid Committee, In 1938, he won election as General Secretary of the London Society of Compositors, and stood down from the London Trades Council. In World War II, he served on the National Arbitration Union, and on Lord Swinton's Security Executive.

Wall retired from his union posts in 1945, but worked for a while as the secretary and welfare officer of C. and E. Layton.

Trade union offices
Preceded by Duncan Carmichael	Secretary of the London Trades Council; 1926–1938	Succeeded by Robert Willis
Preceded by New position	General Secretary of Equity; 1930–1934	Succeeded by Geoffrey Robinson
Preceded by Thomas Naylor	General Secretary of the London Society of Compositors; 1938–1945	Succeeded by Robert Willis
