= C. J. Drummond =

English trade unionist

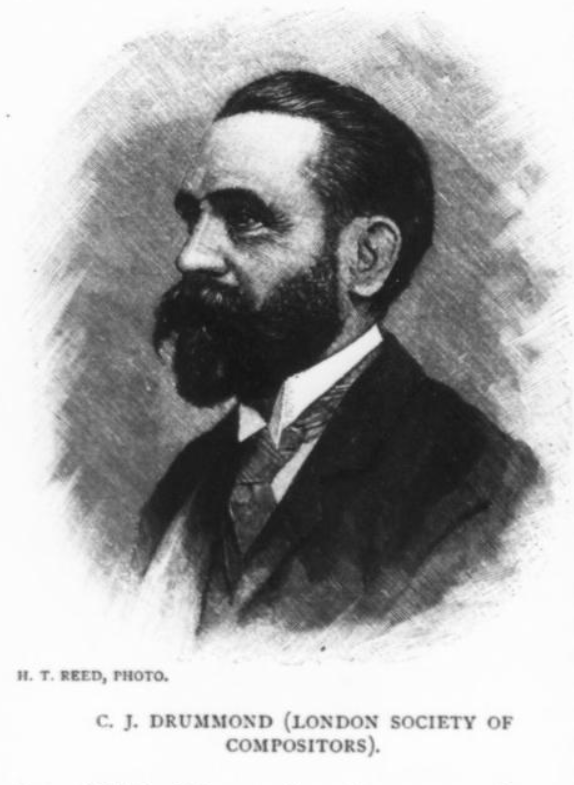
C. J. Drummond in 1890

Charles James Drummond (30 July 1848 – 10 February 1929) was a British trade union leader.

Drummond was born in Ipswich, the son of schoolmaster Charles Drummond and his wife, Lucy Stevens. He became a compositor. In 1869, he moved to London, and immediately joined the London Society of Compositors (LSC), also becoming active on the London Trades Council. He devoted much of his time to the LSC, and within a few years was elected to its committee and appointed as its chairman. In 1878, he was appointed as assistant secretary of the union, then in 1881 he succeeded as its general secretary.

As general secretary, Drummond focused on arbitrating disputes, often finding in favour of the employers, and also on an ultimately successful campaign for a nine-hour working day. He supported women joining the union, but only at the lower, journeyman, level, and proposed a resolution stating that "women are not physically capable of performing the duties of a compositor". In 1890, he was central to the formation of the Printing and Kindred Trades Federation, and served as its first president.

Unlike the large majority of trade unionists, Drummond was a supporter of the Conservative Party. This led to disputes between him and the majority of his union, and he resigned as secretary in 1892. After a period out of work, he found a job with the Labour Department of the Board of Trade, and remained in it until his retirement.

In 1923, Harry Levy-Lawson, 1st Viscount Burnham hosted a lunch in Drummond's honour, at which he was given an annuity of £200 per year.

Trade union offices
| Preceded by Henry Self | General Secretary of the London Society of Compositors; 1881 – 1892 | Succeeded by C. W. Bowerman |
| Preceded by New position | President of the Printing and Kindred Trades Federation; 1891 – 1892 | Succeeded by Henry Slatter |
