= South Suburban Co-operative Society =

Retail co-operative in south London, Surrey and Kent

- Merged into: Co-operative Wholesale Society
- Formation: 1918; 108 years ago
- Dissolved: 28 July 1984; 42 years ago
- Merger of: Croydon Co-operative Society; Bromley Co-operative Society; Crays Co-operative Society; Penge and Beckenham Co-operative Society
- Headquarters: Croydon
- Region served: South London; Surrey; Kent
- Members: 167,000 (1984)
- Affiliations: The Co-operative Party
- Revenue: £47m (1984)
- Staff: 1,100 (1984)

The South Suburban Co-operative Society (SSCS) was a co-operative retailer in south London, Surrey and Kent, England. It became part of the Co-operative Wholesale Society, now the Co-operative Group.

The SSCS came into existence in 1918 with the amalgamation of the Croydon (formed 1887), Bromley and Crays (formed 1882 and 1870) and Penge and Beckenham (formed 1879) Societies. In 1930, SSCS merged with the Reigate Industrial and Provident Society, followed by the Tonbridge Industrial Society in 1938.

In May 1947, a 13-acre (53,000 m^{2}) sports centre was opened at Beckenham and in May 1949 employees were accorded full membership rights.

The SSCS registered office was at 99 London Road, Croydon, Surrey, where it remained until it merged with the Co-operative Wholesale Society on 28 July 1984. Following the merger of the Royal Arsenal Co-operative Society (RACS) with CWS in February 1985, administration of both the SSCS and RACS was moved to Woolwich on 6 May 1985. The London Road offices closed on 17 May 1985 and moved to 18 Blackhorse Lane, Addiscombe until later that year.

Co-operative education was an important part of the SSCS philosophy and in 1920 an Education Department was formed to arrange numerous educational, cultural and social activities and events. It became very influential in both local and national co-operative educational affairs.

The SSCS financially supported a local Co-operative Party Committee, which initiated and sponsored local political candidates and events.

The merger with CWS saw the SSCS operating shops and services over an area of 400 square miles (1,000 km^{2}) of eastern Surrey and western Kent. In its last full trading year, the SSCS had a turnover of £47m, share capital of £1.7m, membership of 167,000, and 1,100 staff.
