= Denis Hanley =

Denis Augustine Hanley (26 July 1903 – 10 June 1980) was a British electrical engineer and Conservative Party politician.

The son of Edmund Hanley of Kintbury, Berkshire, he was educated at Downside School and Trinity College, Cambridge.

At the 1931 general election he was elected as Conservative Party member of parliament for Deptford, unseating the long-serving Labour incumbent, C. W. Bowerman.

In January 1935 he was found guilty of being drunk in charge of a motor car and was disqualified from driving. When an election was called later that year he choose not to defend his seat.

From 1938 to 1954 he was employed by the Royal Naval Scientific Service.

Parliament of the United Kingdom
Preceded by C. W. Bowerman	Member of Parliament for Deptford; 1931–1935	Succeeded by Walter Green
