= Woodlands Farm Trust =

Registered charity in London, England

Coordinates: 51.4673°N 0.0793°E

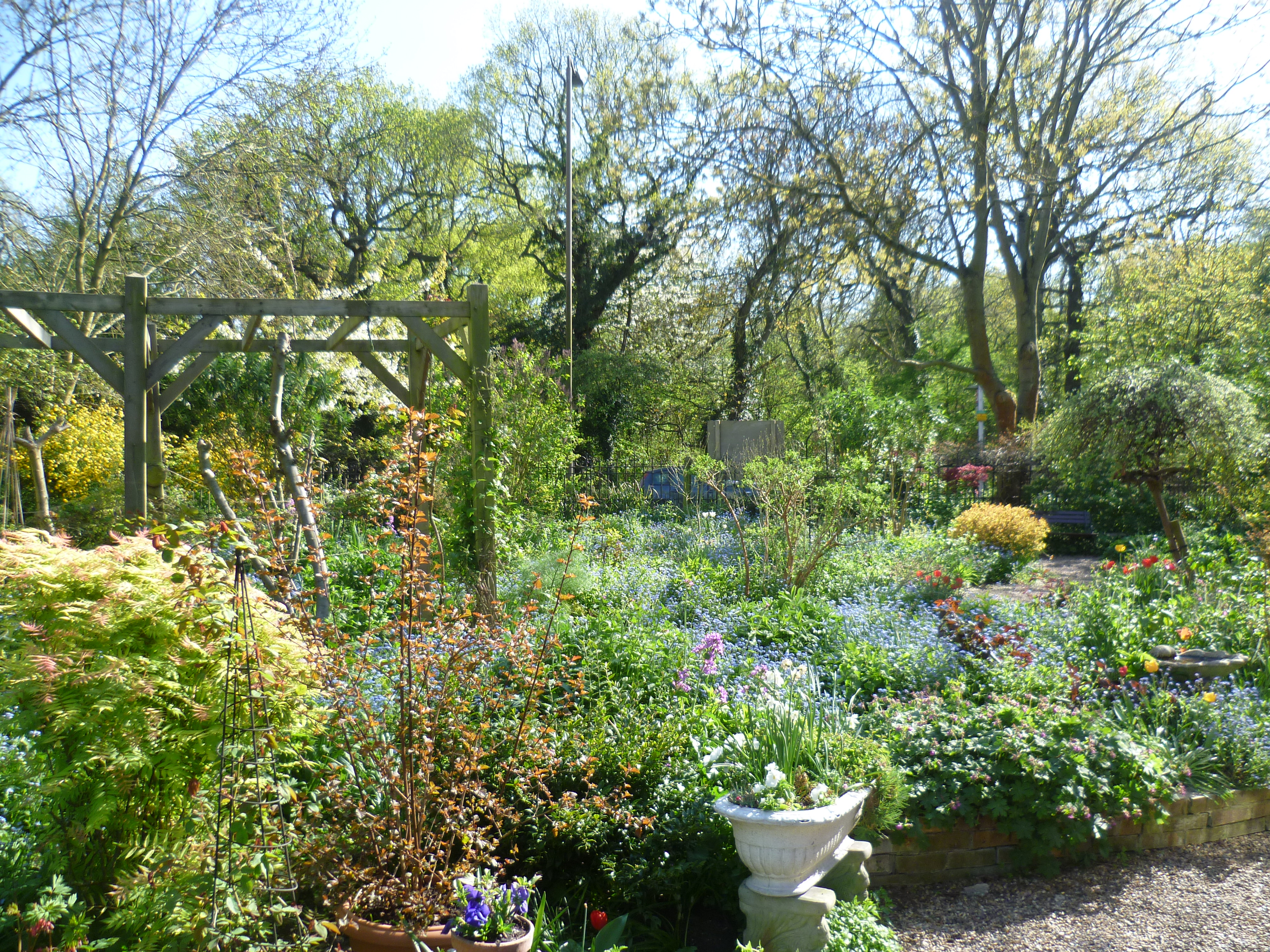
Organic garden at Woodlands Farm

The Woodlands Farm Trust is a registered charity that administers the 89-acre Woodlands urban farm in the Royal Borough of Greenwich, in southeast London. This city farm is located on the east side of Shooter's Hill, around 2km south of Plumstead and 1.5km west of Welling. A watercourse, the Wogebourne, flows northward through the farmland and is joined by several small tributaries.

== History ==
The original 122-acre Woodlands Farm was developed in the early 19th century, and was later managed by the Baldock family. In 1919, it was purchased by the Royal Arsenal Co-operative Society (RACS), later becoming a 'model' pig farm, and, briefly during World War II, a prisoner-of-war camp. In the 1980s, the farm was threatened by Greater London Council plans to build a major road, the East London River Crossing, through the farmland and nearby ancient forest in Oxleas Wood. Local opposition highlighted the issue across Europe and thwarted the plans, and the farmland became protected in 1997 after the Co-operative Group leased the site to the newly formed Woodlands Farm Trust on a 999-year lease at a peppercorn rent.

The farm is located on the east side of Shooter's Hill (on the north side of the A207 road), and is part of a protected stretch of green and wooded spaces between Eltham, Plumstead and Welling in southeast London. It is adjacent to the London Olympic legacy Greenwich Equestrian Skills Centre, managed by Hadlow College.

The community farm is focused on conservation, sustainable farming and education. It holds farm shows throughout the year and has an education centre hosting visits from schools and other groups.
