= Charles James O'Donnell =

Irish colonial administrator

C.J.O'Donnell

Charles James O'Cahan O'Donnell (1849 – 3 December 1934) was an Irish colonial administrator in the British Raj, and later a member of the Parliament of the United Kingdom.

O'Donnell was born in Donegal in 1849. His elder brother was Frank Hugh O'Donnell (1846–1916), later writer, journalist and nationalist politician. He was educated at Queens College Galway, and passed the Indian Civil Service Examinations in 1870. He served in Bengal and dealt with the famine of 1874. His duties also included tenant rights and judicial control of rents.

He was appointed assistant to the Director General of Statistics William Wilson Hunter in 1875 but returned to district work as a joint magistrate in 1884. He was the Superintendent of Bengal for the census of 1891, and rose to Commissioner in 1898 before his retirement in 1900.

O'Donnell had a palpable dislike of Lord Curzon as Viceroy of India, addressing "The Failure of Lord Curzon" to Lord Rosebery. He engaged in politics after his return to the United Kingdom, and was elected as the Liberal opposition candidate for Walworth constituency in London in January 1903. He had to wait another three years for a general election to be called, but was elected as a Liberal member for Walworth in the 1906 general election. In Parliament, O'Donnell levelled heavy criticism at the Secretary of State for India, for actions such as the partition of Bengal in 1905. He decided not to contest the January 1910 general election.

O'Donnell married Constance Langworth in 1882. He died at his residence, London, on 3 December 1934.

His legacy includes the commission of the annual "O'Donnell lectures" on British or Celtic elements in the English language or the existing population of England, which are held at the universities of Edinburgh, Oxford, Aberystwyth, Bangor, Cardiff, Swansea and Lampeter (Trinity St David). The inaugural lecturer was J.R.R. Tolkien in 1954.

== Sources ==
- Jim Haughey (2002). The First World War in Irish Poetry. Bucknell University Press. p. 19. ISBN 978-0-8387-5496-2.
- Robert Knight (1880). The Statesman: a monthly review of home & foreign politics, ed. by R. Knight. pp. 229.

Parliament of the United Kingdom
Preceded by James Bailey	Member of Parliament for Walworth; 1906 – January 1910	Succeeded by James Arthur Dawes
