= The Bailey's Hotel =

Hotel in London

The Bailey's Hotel London
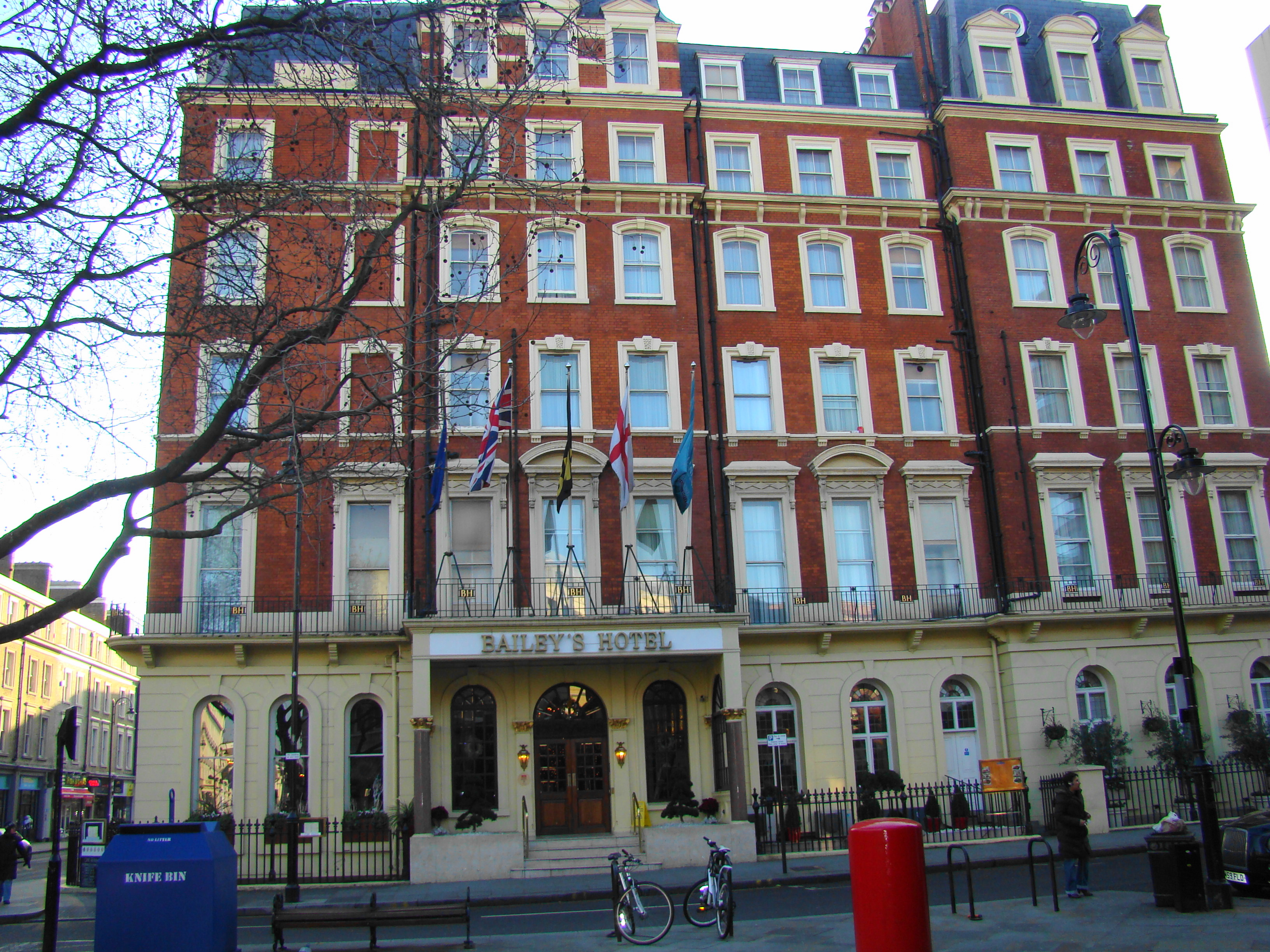
- Facade on Courtfield Road

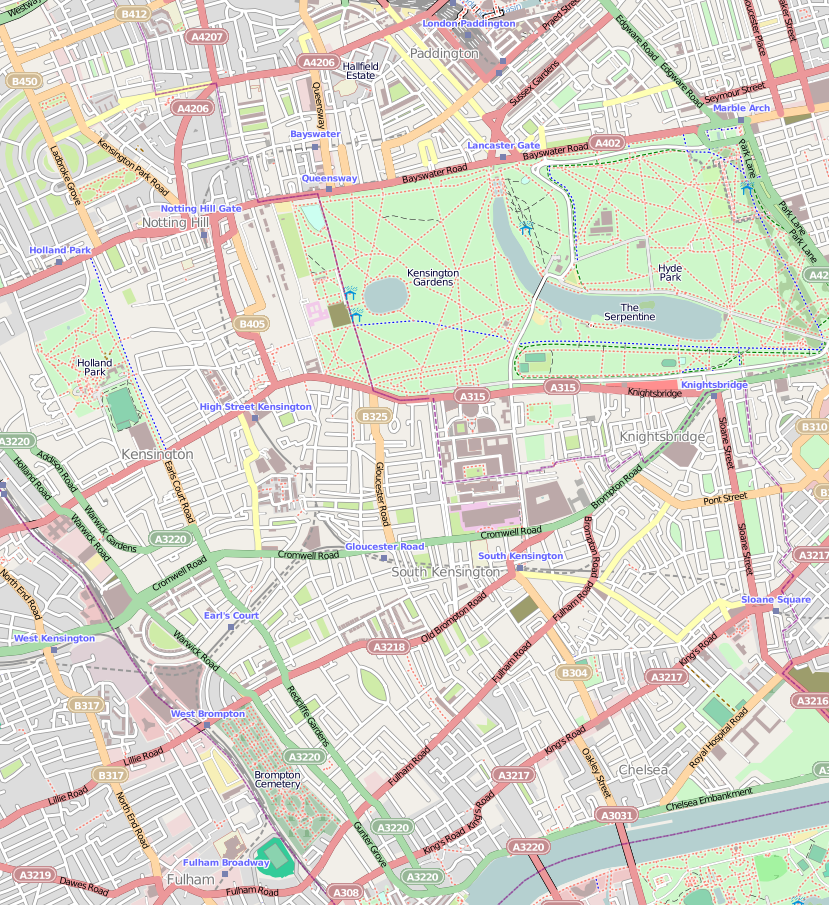
- Location in Kensington

General information
- Location: 140 Gloucester Road, Kensington, London, England
- Coordinates: 51°29′38″N 0°10′58″W
- Operator: Millennium Hotels

Technical details
- Floor count: 5

Design and construction
- Architect: Aldin and Sons
- Developer: Sir James Bailey

Other information
- Number of rooms: 212
- Number of restaurants: 2 (and a bar)

Website
- Official site

The Bailey's Hotel, is a historic hotel in the Kensington district of London. The postal address is 140 Gloucester Road, but the main entrance is on Courtfield Road, opposite Gloucester Road tube station. It was established in 1876 and named after its original owner, Sir James Bailey (1840-1910), Member of Parliament.

== History ==
Bailey's Hotel was one of the earliest privately built hotels in London, built between 1874 and 1876 by Aldin and Sons under the command of James Bailey, a hotelier. He erected the hotel in an upmarket location so as to attract London's aristocracy and wealthier inhabitants and to be easily accessible through Gloucester Road tube station. When completed the hotel also included nine stables to host a carriage service from the hotel.

In 1877 Bailey extended Bailey's Hotel along Courtfield Road and in 1881 replaced the stables with a garden and additional buildings, which today houses the Bombay Brasserie restaurant. In 1883 Bailey installed new bedrooms and built a new elevator and installed electric lights in 1890.

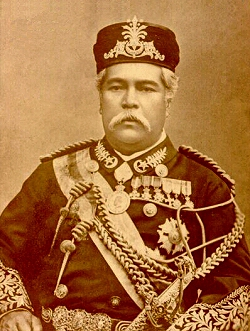
Abu Bakar of Johor spent his last days at Bailey's Hotel before dying of pneumonia on 4 June 1895.

By the 1890s Bailey's Hotel was one of the more successful hotels in London with over 300 rooms, and was popular with international guests. An American tourist guide published in 1891 mentioned the "cosy, homelike atmosphere, which is enhanced by the rich and substantial surroundings" (all for $1 a night at the time). Sultan Abu Bakar of Johor spent his last days in bed at the hotel before dying of pneumonia on 4 June 1895. At the peak of its success, Bailey sold the hotel to Spiers & Pond Limited in 1894, but remained as Managing Director for several years, as he was elected a Member of Parliament for Walworth, Newington, and was knighted in 1905.

By 1914 Bailey's Hotel faced stiff competition, with some fourteen hotels in eighteen buildings in close proximity. It survived, though, and during World War II was hit by an incendiary bomb, causing a major fire and damage, and again on 8 March 1941. A further fire broke out in the staff quarters in 1945, damaging the ceilings and floorboards, which meant the building had to be evacuated at a time when it was being used as a provisional hospital.

It was not until 1952-54 that the hotel was renovated, and new bathrooms were added in 1954 and a new bar in 1958. However, the hotel had significantly fallen from grace and was not the elegant, upmarket hotel it had been, and it changed ownership many times. The Royal Borough of Kensington and Chelsea protected the hotel from being demolished in the 1970s and 1980s because of its historical value. In the 1970s a room in the hotel cost just $12 a night, compared to $110 today. The hotel was completely restored in 1988 and purchased from the Taj Group by Securum Hotel Holdings in 1992, and by City Developments Limited (CDL) in July 1994. It is now operated by Millennium & Copthorne Hotels.

== Architecture ==
=== Exterior ===
The building retains its elegant Victorian appearance. The name of the hotel, Bailey's Hotel, is written in gold lettering above a central porch. Above the name are five royal flags of Great Britain.

=== Interior ===
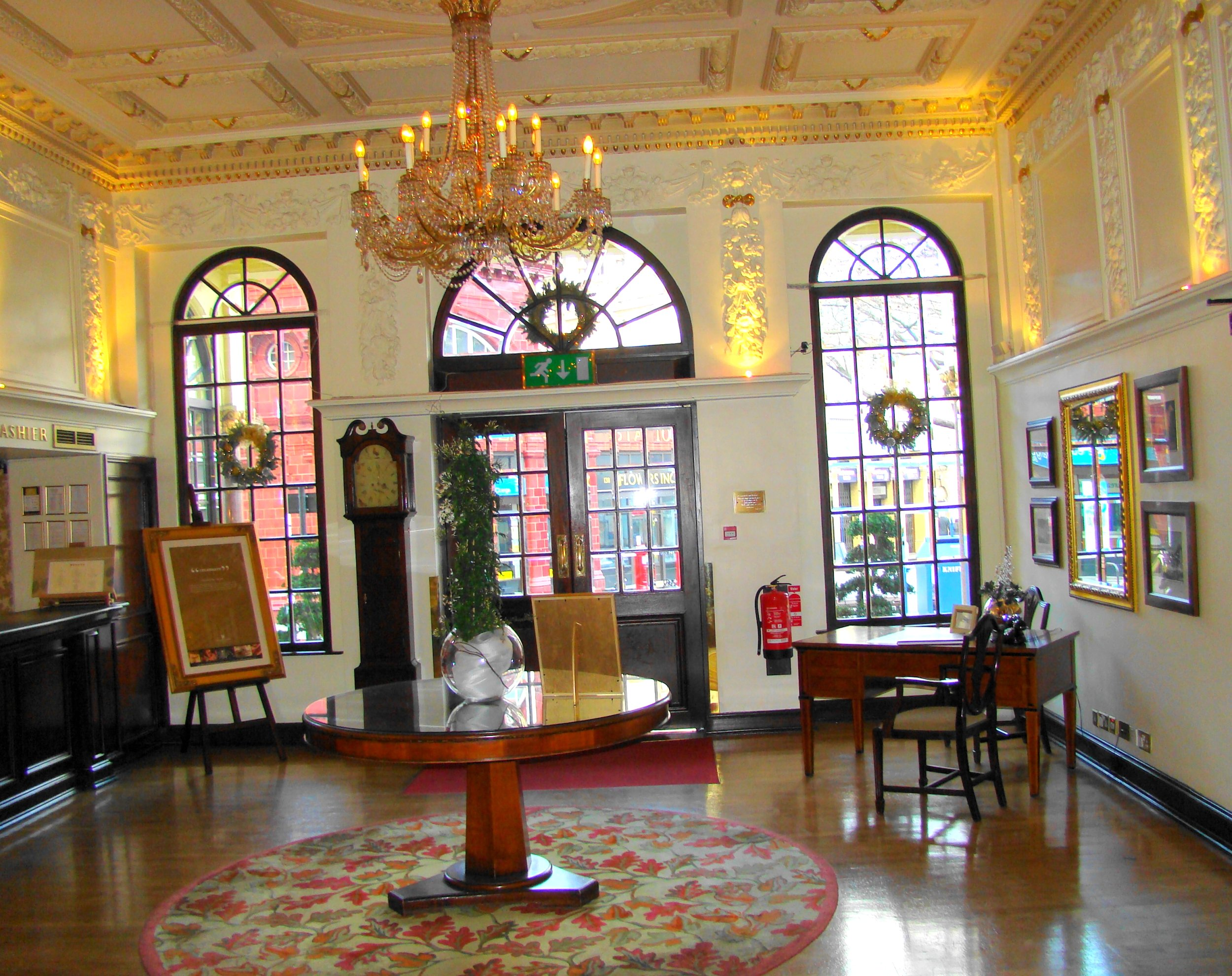
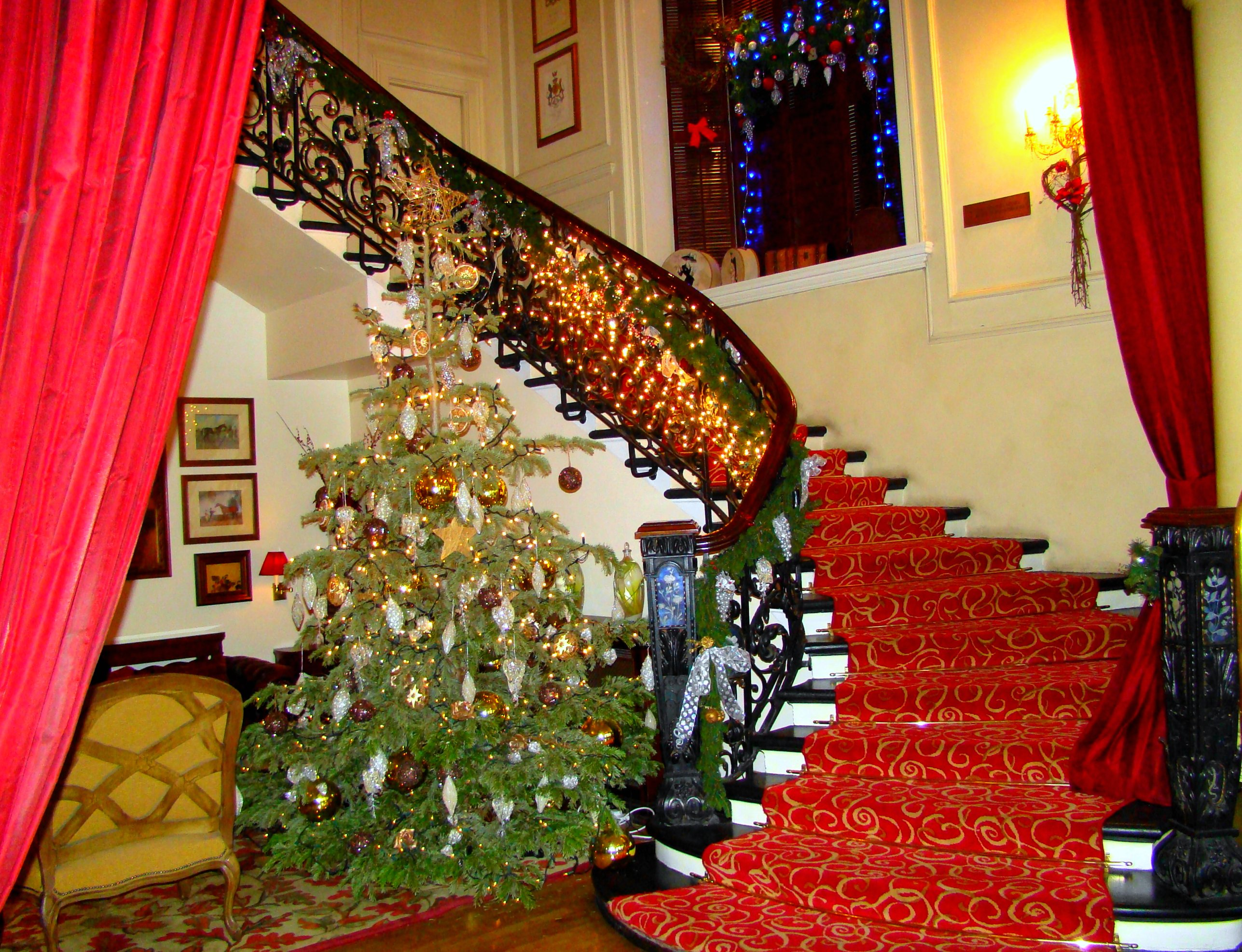
Bailey's Hotel at Christmas time. Left:Lobby. Right:Staircase

In 1996 it underwent renovation but today the hotel retains many of its Victorian furnishings, including the period fireplaces and grand, spiralling main staircase. The hotel is 5 floors in height and contains 212 rooms.

The main restaurant is the Bugis Singapore , which serves Singapore cuisine and Olive's Restaurant, a stylish Victorian restaurant that serves continental and full English breakfasts. The main bar is called Baileys Bar.
