= 1927 Canterbury by-election =

UK parliamentary by-election

The 1927 Canterbury by-election was a parliamentary by-election for the British House of Commons constituency of Canterbury, Kent on 24 November 1927.

== Vacancy ==
The by-election was caused by the elevation to the peerage of the sitting Unionist MP, Rt Hon. Ronald McNeill on 4 November 1927. He had been MP here since winning the seat at its creation in 1918.

== Election history ==
From its first election as a county constituency in 1918 onwards, Canterbury was a safe Unionist seat. The result at the last General Election was;

1924 general election: Canterbury Electorate 36,045
Party	Candidate	Votes	%	±%
Unionist	Ronald McNeill	16,693	70.3	+11.9
Liberal	David Carnegie	7,061	29.7	−11.9
Majority		9,632	40.6	+23.8
Turnout		23,754	65.9	+9.4
Unionist hold		Swing	+11.9	

== Candidates ==
- On 7 November 1927 The Canterbury Unionist Association chose 58-year-old Sir William Wayland as their candidate to defend the seat. He served as Mayor of Deptford from 1914 to 1920, for which he was knighted in the 1920 New Year Honours.
- The Canterbury Liberal Association re-adopted David Carnegie as their candidate to challenge for the seat. He had fought the seat at the last General Election. He had represented the Canadian Government on numerous commissions. He was a member of the Executive Committee of the League of Nations Union.

On 15 November 1927 the local Labour Party met and decided not to run a candidate.

== Campaign ==
Polling Day was set for 24 November 1927, just 20 days after the announcement of the vacancy, allowing for virtually no campaign.

Agricultural issues dominated the election.

Liberal Leader David Lloyd George visited Canterbury to speak in support of the Liberal candidate.

On 19 November 1927 voters polled in the 1927 Southend by-election which saw the Unionists hold the seat with a swing to the Liberals of less than 5%.

At an eve of poll Unionist meeting the former Canterbury MP Lord Cushendun criticised "Ignorant Liberal Bleatings".

== Result ==
Despite a swing of 13% to the Liberals, Wayland was able to hang onto the seat with some ease.

1927 Canterbury by-election Electorate 39,229
Party	Candidate	Votes	%	±%
Unionist	William Wayland	13,657	57.3	−13.0
Liberal	David Carnegie	10,175	42.7	+13.0
Majority		3,482	14.6	−26.0
Turnout		23,832	60.8	−5.1
Unionist hold		Swing	-13.0	

== Aftermath ==
The Labour Party intervened in the next contest and enabled the Unionists to increase their majority. The result at the following General Election;

1929 general election: Canterbury Electorate 49,499
Party	Candidate	Votes	%	±%
Unionist	William Wayland	19,181	56.7	−0.6
Liberal	David Carnegie	9,937	29.4	−13.3
Labour	P S Eastman	4,703	13.9	New
Majority		9,244	27.3	+12.7
Turnout		33,821	68.3	+7.5
Unionist hold		Swing	+6.3	

== See also ==
- List of United Kingdom by-elections
- United Kingdom by-election records
