= Evelyn George Harcourt Powell =

English politician (1883–1961)

Lieutenant-Colonel Evelyn George Harcourt Powell (21 February 1883 – 15 July 1961) was a British Army officer, and Conservative MP for Southwark South East.

== Biography ==
Powell was commissioned into the Militia as a second lieutenant in the 3rd Battalion, Gordon Highlanders on 2 May 1900. He joined the Regular Army on 5 January 1901 as a second lieutenant in the Grenadier Guards, and was promoted to lieutenant on 21 May 1904, captain on 16 November 1908 and major on 1 September 1915, later antedated to 15 July 1915. He was an acting lieutenant-colonel while commanding the 9th Battalion, London Regiment from 25 September 1916 to 6 September 1918 and from 12 October 1918 to 5 May 1919. On 3 June 1923 he succeeded Bertram Sergison-Brooke as commander of the 1st Battalion, Grenadier Guards, with promotion to lieutenant-colonel. On 3 June 1927 he completed his period of service in command of the battalion and retired, being appointed a lieutenant-colonel in the Reserve of Officers with seniority from 30 November 1920.

He contested Southwark South East in 1929, won it from Labour in 1931, but lost it back to them in 1935.

He had two daughters: Elizabeth who married Christopher Tennant, 2nd Baron Glenconner and was the mother of Emma Tennant, and Anne who married Philip Toynbee and Richard Wollheim and was the mother of Polly Toynbee.

Parliament of the United Kingdom
Preceded by Thomas Ellis Naylor	Member of Parliament for Southwark South East; 1931 – 1935	Succeeded by Thomas Ellis Naylor
