= C. W. Bowerman =

British trade unionist and politician

The Right Honourable C. W. Bowerman
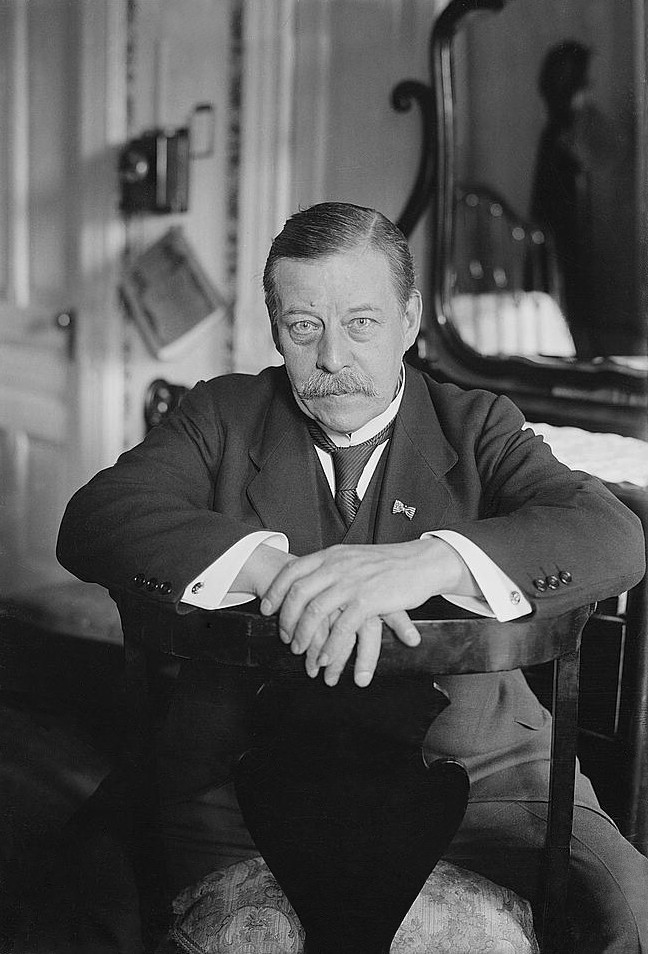
- Bowerman in 1917

Member of Parliament for Deptford
- In office 8 February 1906 – 27 October 1931
- Preceded by: Arthur Henry Aylmer Morton
- Succeeded by: Denis Augustine Hanley

1st General Secretary of the Trades Union Congress
- In office 1921–1923
- Assistant: Fred Bramley
- Preceded by: new office
- Succeeded by: Fred Bramley

11th Secretary of the Parliamentary Committee of the Trades Union Congress
- In office 1911–1921
- Preceded by: W. C. Steadman
- Succeeded by: office abolished

Alderman of the London County Council
- In office 1901–1907

President of the Trades Union Congress
- In office 1901
- Secretary: Sam Woods
- Preceded by: William Pickles
- Succeeded by: W. C. Steadman

General Secretary of the London Society of Compositors
- In office 1892–1906
- Preceded by: C. J. Drummond
- Succeeded by: Thomas Naylor

Personal details
- Born: 22 January 1851 Honiton, Devon, England
- Died: 11 June 1947 (aged 96) Highbury, London, England
- Party: Labour
- Other political affiliations: Progressive
- Occupation: Trade unionist, compositor, jeweller

Charles William Bowerman PC (22 January 1851 – 11 June 1947) was a British trade unionist and politician.

== Life ==
Born in Honiton, Bowerman moved to Clerkenwell in London at an early age. On leaving education, he worked as a jeweller and then a compositor. In 1872 he briefly worked for Hour newspaper before moving to The Daily Telegraph. He joined the London Society of Compositors in 1873 and became its General Secretary in 1892, a post he held until 1906.

In 1893, Bowerman joined the Fabian Society, and in 1897, he was elected to the Parliamentary Committee of the Trades Union Congress, the body which later became the General Council. In 1901, was elected as a Progressive Party alderman on London County Council, a position he held until 1907.

Bowerman was the President of the TUC in 1901, and the Secretary of the Parliamentary Committee from 1911 until 1921, when he became the organisation's first General Secretary. He retired from the post in 1923.

In 1906, Bowerman was elected as the Labour Party Member of Parliament for Deptford, a post he retained until the 1931 general election, becoming a privy councillor in 1916.

In the years following his defeat, Bowerman joined the Next Five Years Group, the council of Ruskin College and the board of directors of the Co-operative Printing Society.

He died on 11 June 1947.

== Legacy ==
There is a plaque commemorating Bowerman on 4 Battledean Road, a house in London N5.

Parliament of the United Kingdom
Preceded by Arthur Henry Aylmer Morton	Member of Parliament for Deptford; 1906–1931	Succeeded by Denis Hanley
Preceded by T. P. O'Connor	Oldest Member of Parliament (not Father of the House); 1929–1931	Succeeded by Samuel Samuel
Trade union offices
Preceded by C. J. Drummond	General Secretary of the London Society of Compositors; 1892–1906	Succeeded by Thomas Naylor
Preceded by William Inskip	Treasurer of the Trades Union Congress; 1899–1901	Succeeded by W. C. Steadman
Preceded by Francis Chandler	Chairman of the Parliamentary Committee of the Trades Union Congress; 1900	Succeeded by W. C. Steadman
Preceded by William Pickles	President of the Trades Union Congress; 1901	Succeeded by W. C. Steadman
Preceded by W. C. Steadman	Secretary of the Parliamentary Committee of the Trades Union Congress; 1911–1921	Office abolished
New office	General Secretary of the Trades Union Congress; 1921–1923	Succeeded by Fred Bramley
