= Milk for Spain =

British relief operation for Spanish Civil War victims

Milk for Spain was a British relief operation for the victims of the Spanish Civil War. Labour activists from the Co-operative Union along with the Labour Party set up the relief effort.

== Background ==
Whilst the Conservative government of Neville Chamberlain preserved official neutrality in its dealings with Spain following the 1936 military uprising, the civilian population of the Republic suffered terrible hardships in the winters that followed. The bombings and battles caught the attention of the media, but hunger and disease spread as supplies became difficult to obtain, with the coastlines being cut off from the Republican strongholds in the north and south of Spain.

As refugees congregating upon Catalonia and Valencia swelled the population of these cities by twice their normal size, the refugee homes often went for three days without a meal. No milk was being supplied without a certificate. The hunt for food led to some attempting to eat edible herbs and grass. Many of the children were left to sleep all day by their families to reduce the awareness of starvation. In these conditions, one in three refugee children became affected by tuberculosis. This was soon to amount to tens of thousands of consumptive children.

== Relief programme ==
In November 1937 a Milk for Spain fund was opened after an appeal to the various co-operative societies and Labour Party branches around the country. The response was overwhelming. The London Co-op raised £877 alone. In addition to large contributions from societies, anybody who shopped at a Co-op store was able to buy milk tokens; the proceeds of which would go to the Republican civilians. In particular, the milk was directed at children of under four years old and invalids. As the rate of donations from the societies gradually subsided, the selling of six-penny and three-penny tokens in shops assumed growing importance.

A major problem was how to deliver the supplies. The first delivery ship had a hazardous journey, with many delays. Deliveries by road were slowed by the difficult logistics involved in contracting lorries in France. Rail was probably the most reliable form of supply. All three methods were used; with no consignment ever going astray. The Co-operative Wholesale Society's Export Department lent its assistance to ensure the safe delivery of all consignments.

The first consignment of CWS powdered and condensed milk, over 7,000 cases, arrived in early 1938. These were sent to distribution centres under strict supervision of the Milk for Spain Committee. From here, the milk was distributed through maternity hospitals, food kitchens and rations.

By March 1938, co-operators had raised over £9,000, the Labour Party over £5,100. The Municipal Clinic in Madrid, the Catalonia region and Barcelona all benefited, as the insurgents made gains across the country. The Co-operative Union often spent the money before it had arrived, realising the urgency of the situation, and sent out a second appeal to co-ops in July 1938. A second wave of leaflets and posters were produced. A quickening in the rate of donations enabled Milk Canteens to be set up in elementary schools in Barcelona.

The breakdown of the Front in Catalonia exacerbated transport difficulties still further, but with the assistance of the International Federation of Trade Unions, supplies were maintained by sea until the final capitulation of the Republic.

By May 1939, more than £32,500 had been raised to alleviate the suffering of the Spanish people at the hands of insurgents and the Axis powers. Much of this money had come from people in deprived areas, and a retailer struggling with recession.

More than 4,000 Basque children had been brought to Britain and adopted. The remainder of the money was directed towards Spanish emigrants who had fled to refugee camps around Europe.
