= Walworth (UK Parliament constituency) =

Parliamentary constituency in the United Kingdom, 1885–1918

- Former borough constituency for the House of Commons
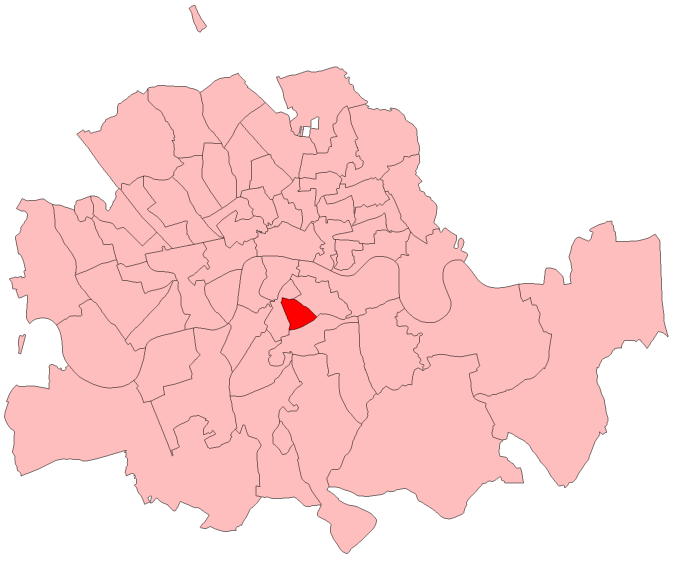
- Walworth in London

1885–1918
- Seats: one
- Created from: Lambeth (part of)
- Replaced by: Southwark South East

Walworth (strictly the Walworth division of Newington) was a parliamentary constituency centred on the Walworth district of South London, within the Newington Vestry. It returned one Member of Parliament (MP) to the House of Commons of the Parliament of the United Kingdom.

== History ==
The constituency was created by the Redistribution of Seats Act 1885 for the 1885 general election, and abolished for the 1918 general election.

== Members of Parliament ==
Election	Member	Party
1885	Lewis Isaacs	Conservative
1892	William Saunders	Liberal
1895 by-election	Sir James Bailey	Conservative
1906	Charles O'Donnell	Liberal
1910	James Dawes	Liberal
1916	James Dawes	Coalition Liberal
1918	constituency abolished	

== Elections ==
Decades:	1880s; 1890s; 1900s; 1910s

=== Elections in the 1880s ===
General election 1885: Walworth
Party	Candidate	Votes	%
Conservative	Lewis Henry Isaacs	1,885	47.8
Liberal	Alfred Gutteres Henriques	1,816	46.0
Independent Liberal	William Malthouse	246	6.2
Majority		69	1.8
Turnout		3,947	70.5
Registered electors		5,598	
Conservative win (new seat)			

General election 1886: Walworth
Party	Candidate	Votes	%	±%
Conservative	Lewis Henry Isaacs	1,983	53.1	+5.3
Liberal	Jabez Balfour	1,748	46.9	+0.9
Majority		235	6.2	+4.4
Turnout		3,731	66.6	−3.9
Registered electors		5,598		
Conservative hold		Swing	+2.2	

=== Elections in the 1890s ===
General election 1892: Walworth
Party	Candidate	Votes	%	±%
Liberal	William Saunders	2,514	53.1	+6.2
Conservative	Lewis Henry Isaacs	2,218	46.9	−6.2
Majority		296	6.2	N/A
Turnout		4,732	69.6	+3.0
Registered electors		6,798		
Liberal gain from Conservative		Swing	+6.2	

Saunders' death caused a by-election.

By-election, 14 May 1895: Walworth
Party	Candidate	Votes	%	±%
Conservative	James Bailey	2,676	52.2	+5.3
Liberal	James Colquhoun Revell Reade	2,105	41.0	−12.1
Social Democratic Federation	George Lansbury	347	6.8	New
Majority		571	11.2	N/A
Turnout		5,128	69.0	−0.6
Registered electors		7,430		
Conservative gain from Liberal		Swing	+8.7	

Bailey

General election 1895: Walworth
Party	Candidate	Votes	%	±%
Conservative	James Bailey	2,822	53.3	+6.4
Liberal	Russell Spokes	2,269	42.9	−10.2
Social Democratic Federation	George Lansbury	203	3.8	N/A
Majority		553	10.4	N/A
Turnout		5,294	71.3	+1.7
Registered electors		7,430		
Conservative gain from Liberal		Swing	+8.3	

=== Elections in the 1900s ===
General election 1900: Walworth
Party	Candidate	Votes	%	±%
Conservative	James Bailey	3,098	58.1	+4.8
Liberal	Russell Spokes	2,233	41.9	−1.0
Majority		865	16.2	+5.8
Turnout		5,331	68.6	−2.7
Registered electors		7,770		
Conservative hold		Swing	+2.9	

O'Donnell

General election 1906: Walworth
Party	Candidate	Votes	%	±%
Liberal	Charles James O'Donnell	3,187	56.9	+15.0
Conservative	James Bailey	2,418	43.1	−15.0
Majority		769	13.8	N/A
Turnout		5,605	78.4	+9.8
Registered electors		7,147		
Liberal gain from Conservative		Swing	+15.0	

=== Elections in the 1910s ===
Dawes

General election January 1910: Walworth
Party	Candidate	Votes	%	±%
Liberal	James Dawes	3,509	51.4	−5.5
Conservative	Ralph Emanuel Belilios	3,319	48.6	+5.5
Majority		190	2.8	−11.0
Turnout		6,828	80.1	+1.7
Registered electors		8,521		
Liberal hold		Swing	-5.5	

General election December 1910: Walworth
Party	Candidate	Votes	%	±%
Liberal	James Dawes	3,248	52.0	+0.6
Conservative	Ralph Emanuel Belilios	2,994	48.0	−0.6
Majority		254	4.0	+1.2
Turnout		6,242	73.3	−6.8
Registered electors		8,521		
Liberal hold		Swing	+0.6	

General Election 1914–15:

Another General Election was required to take place before the end of 1915. The political parties had been making preparations for an election to take place and by July 1914, the following candidates had been selected;

- Liberal: James Dawes
- Unionist:
