= William Wayland =

English Conservative Party politician and farmer

Lieutenant-Colonel Sir William Abraham Edward Wayland (1 September 1869 – 15 July 1950) was an English Conservative Party politician and farmer. He sat in the House of Commons from 1927 to 1945.

Wayland was educated at Marlowes College. He served as Mayor of Deptford from 1914 to 1920, for which he was knighted in the 1920 New Year Honours. He was elected as the Member of Parliament (MP) for Canterbury at a by-election in November 1927, holding the seat until he retired in 1945 because of a wish expressed by party leaders that no candidate should be aged over 70.

In 1931, the Conservative whip was withdrawn from him when he supported Sir Ernest Petter, standing as an Independent Conservative against the official Conservative candidate, in the Westminster St George's by-election, but it was restored before the general election later that year.

Wayland served as chairman of the Empire Day Movement from 1927 to 1948.

== Footnotes ==
Parliament of the United Kingdom
Preceded by Ronald McNeill	Member of Parliament for Canterbury; 1927 – 1945	Succeeded by John Baker White
Civic offices
Preceded by William Francis Marchant	Mayor of Deptford; 1914–1920	Succeeded by Walter Green
