= Croydon Co-operative Society =

Coordinates: 51.3809°N 0.1056°W

The Croydon Co-operative Society was a cooperative retailer in Croydon and surrounding parts of Surrey, England. In 1918, it became part of the new South Suburban Co-operative Society, now the Co-operative Group.

A co-operative society had been formed in Croydon in 1860, the Croydon Co-operative Industrial Society, with headquarters in Market Street and later at 39 Church Street. However, after several years of good progress, the Society went into voluntary liquidation in March 1874.

A new society was formed in 1887, established at 85 Chelsham Road, South Croydon. It first traded at 118 Church Street, then in 1888 moved to 128-130 Church Street and taking over neighbouring 132 in 1897. It was beset by inefficiency and poor practice, and competition from the rival Co-operative Coal Society operating from 1895 to 1902, registered in Northbrook Road. It was able to overcome other competition issues by a series of mergers - the Caterham Co-operative Society in 1906, the Epsom Co-operative Society in 1916 and the Sutton Co-operative Society.

In 1907, the Society moved its trading premises to 30 London Road and then in 1914 it began to develop 99 London Road, north of central Croydon, which would later become the headquarters of the South Suburban. Shops were opened in South Norwood and Thornton Heath, and a bakery and stables in Windmill Hill, as well as the shops of the merged societies. In 1917, just prior to merger, it had 7,595 members and 175 employees.

Key figures in the Croydon Society included Charles Bailey and Albert Gore. Bailey, an engineer, served as President from 1903, taking the society through the merger into the South Suburban and becoming President of the new society until 1938 – 35 years in office in total. Gore served on the board of Croydon and South Suburban for most of the period from the 1890s until 1945, and was a councillor in the town also.
