= Southwark South East (UK Parliament constituency) =

Parliamentary constituency in the United Kingdom, 1918–1950

- Former borough constituency for the House of Commons

1918–1950
- Seats: one
- Created from: Walworth
- Replaced by: Southwark

Southwark (Br [ˈsʌðɨk]) South East was a parliamentary constituency in the Metropolitan Borough of Southwark, in South London. It returned one Member of Parliament (MP) to the House of Commons of the Parliament of the United Kingdom.

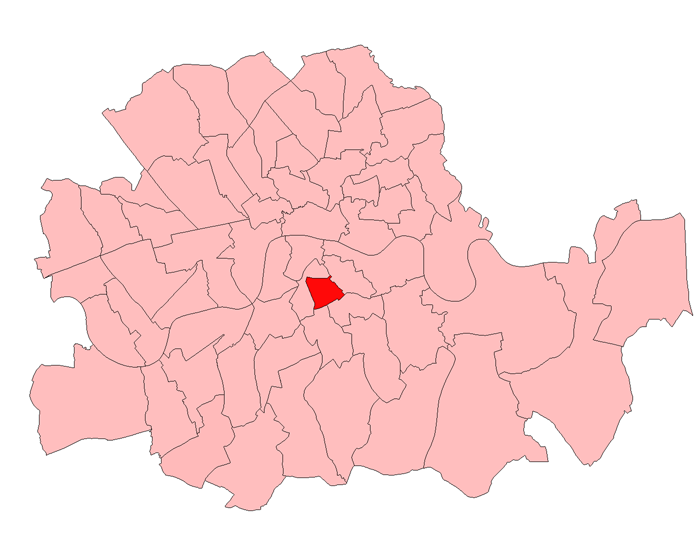
Southwark South East in the Parliamentary County of London, 1918-49

A map showing the wards of Southwark Metropolitan Borough as they appeared in 1916.

The constituency was created for the 1918 general election, and abolished for the 1950 general election, when it was largely replaced by the new Southwark constituency.

The constituency comprised the wards of St. George, St. John and St. Peter. It covered most of East Walworth and Faraday wards, together with a sliver of Grange ward, in the modern day London Borough of Southwark.

== Members of Parliament ==
Election	Member	Party
1918	James Dawes	Coalition Liberal
1921 by-election	Thomas Naylor	Labour
1922	Maurice Alexander	National Liberal
Nov 1923	Maurice Alexander	Liberal
Dec 1923	Thomas Naylor	Labour
1931	George Powell	Conservative
1935	Thomas Naylor	Labour
1950	constituency abolished	

== Elections ==
=== Elections in the 1910s ===
J.A. Dawes

General election 1918: Southwark South East
Party		Candidate	Votes	%
C	Coalition Liberal	James Dawes	7,208	72.6
	Labour	Thomas Naylor	2,718	27.4
Majority			4,490	45.2
Turnout			9,926	45.2
	National Liberal win (new seat)			
C indicates candidate endorsed by the coalition government.

=== Elections in the 1920s ===
Jacobsen

1921 Southwark South East by-election
Party	Candidate	Votes	%	±%
Labour	Thomas Naylor	6,561	57.0	+29.6
National Liberal	Owen Jacobsen	2,636	22.9	−49.7
Ind. Unionist	Horace Louis Petit Boot	2,307	20.1	New
Majority		3,925	34.1	N/A
Turnout		11,504	38.5	−6.7
Labour gain from National Liberal		Swing	+39.6	

M. Alexander

General election 1922: Southwark South East
Party	Candidate	Votes	%	±%
National Liberal	Maurice Alexander	10,014	56.4	–16.2
Labour	Thomas Naylor	7,734	43.6	+16.2
Majority		2,280	12.8	N/A
Turnout		17,748	58.2	+13.0
National Liberal hold		Swing	–16.2	

General election 1923: Southwark South East
Party	Candidate	Votes	%	±%
Labour	Thomas Naylor	9,374	54.3	+10.7
Liberal	Maurice Alexander	7,884	45.7	−10.7
Majority		1,490	8.6	N/A
Turnout		17,258	55.7	−2.5
Labour gain from Liberal		Swing	+10.7	

Elias

General election 1924: Southwark South East
Party	Candidate	Votes	%	±%
Labour	Thomas Naylor	11,635	54.3	0.0
Unionist	Geoffrey Lloyd	7,387	34.5	New
Liberal	Elsie Elias	2,388	11.2	−34.5
Majority		4,248	19.8	+11.2
Turnout		21,410	68.1	+8.4
Labour hold		Swing		

General election 1929: Southwark South East
Party	Candidate	Votes	%	±%
Labour	Thomas Naylor	13,527	60.4	+6.1
Liberal	William John Squire	4,766	21.3	+10.1
Unionist	Evelyn George Harcourt Powell	4,086	18.3	−16.2
Majority		8,761	39.1	+19.3
Turnout		22,379	58.9	−9.2
Labour hold		Swing	-2.0	

=== Elections in the 1930s ===
General election 1931: Southwark South East
Party	Candidate	Votes	%	±%
Conservative	Evelyn George Harcourt Powell	11,063	53.3	+35.0
Labour	Thomas Naylor	9,678	46.7	−13.7
Majority		1,385	6.6	N/A
Turnout		20,741	54.1	−4.8
Conservative gain from Labour		Swing		

General election 1935: Southwark South East
Party	Candidate	Votes	%	±%
Labour	Thomas Naylor	11,942	63.2	+16.5
Conservative	Evelyn George Harcourt Powell	6,945	36.8	−16.5
Majority		4,997	26.4	+19.8
Turnout		18,887	53.3	−0.8
Labour gain from Conservative		Swing		

General Election 1939–40

Another General Election was required to take place before the end of 1940. The political parties had been making preparations for an election to take place and by the Autumn of 1939, the following candidates had been selected;

- Labour: Thomas Naylor
- Conservative:

=== Elections in the 1940s ===
General election 1945: Southwark South East
Party	Candidate	Votes	%	±%
Labour	Thomas Naylor	9,599	76.9	+13.7
Conservative	James Greenwood	2,881	23.1	−13.7
Majority		6,718	53.8	+27.4
Turnout		12,480	60.8	+7.5
Labour hold		Swing		
