= 1921 Southwark South East by-election =

UK parliamentary by-election

- 14 December 1921
- Registered: 29,884
- Turnout: 38.5%
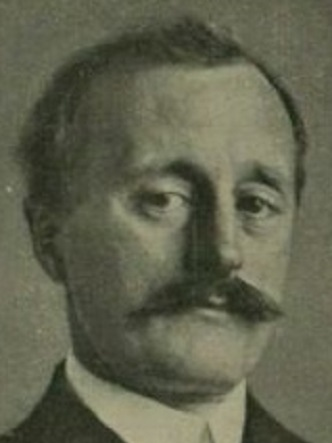

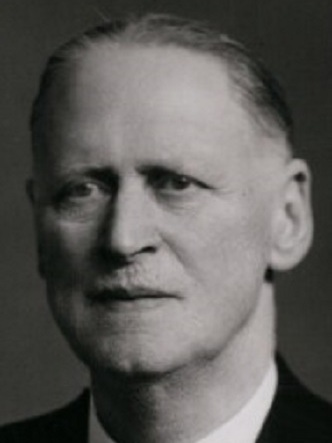
Candidate	Thomas Naylor	Owen Jacobsen	Horace Boot
Party	Labour	National Liberal	Ind. Conservative
Alliance		Coalition
Popular vote	6,561	2,636	2,307
Percentage	57.0%	22.9%	20.1%
Swing	▲29.6%	▼49.7%	New
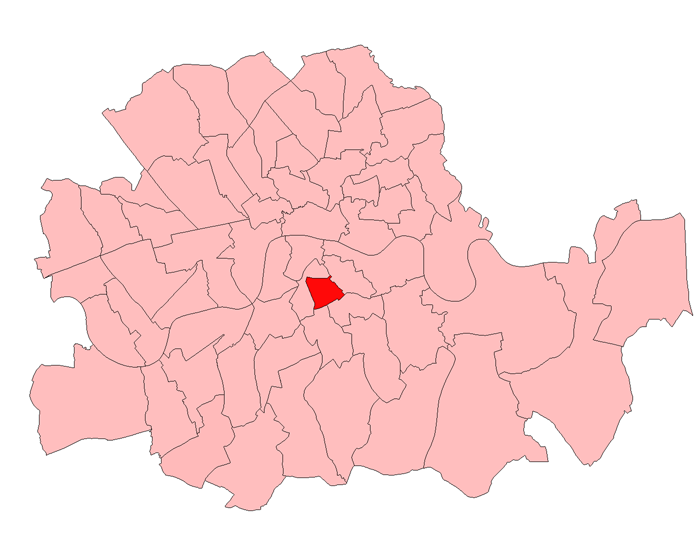
MP before election
James Dawes
National Liberal
Subsequent MP
Thomas Naylor
Labour

The 1921 Southwark South East by-election was a parliamentary by-election held on 14 December 1921 for the British House of Commons constituency of Southwark South East, in the Metropolitan Borough of Southwark in London.

The seat had become vacant on the death of the constituency's Coalition Liberal Member of Parliament (MP), James Arthur Dawes. Dawes had been MP for Southwark South East since the 1918 election, and before that Walworth since the January 1910 election. The Labour Party gained the seat from the Liberal Party.

== Previous result ==
Dawes

General election 1918: Southwark South East
Party		Candidate	Votes	%
C	National Liberal	James Dawes	7,208	72.6
	Labour	Thomas Naylor	2,718	27.4
Majority			4,490	45.2
Turnout			9,926	45.2
Registered electors			27,512	
	National Liberal win (new seat)			
C indicates candidate endorsed by the coalition government.

== Result ==
Southwark South East by-election, 1921
Party		Candidate	Votes	%	±%
	Labour	Thomas Naylor	6,561	57.0	+29.6
C	National Liberal	Owen Jacobsen	2,636	22.9	–49.7
	Ind. Conservative	Horace Boot	2,307	20.1	New
Majority			3,925	34.1	N/A
Turnout			11,504	38.5	−6.7
Registered electors			29,884		
	Labour gain from National Liberal		Swing	+39.6	
C indicates candidate endorsed by the coalition government.

== See also ==
- List of United Kingdom by-elections
- Southwark South East constituency
