= Thomas Naylor (politician) =

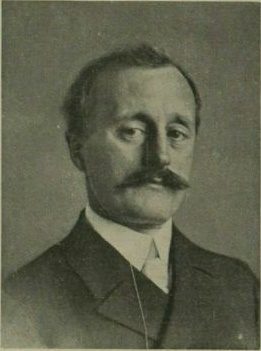
- Naylor in 1919.

Personal details
- Born: 5 March 1868
- Died: 24 December 1958 (aged 90)
- Political party: Labour

Thomas Ellis Naylor (5 March 1868 – 24 December 1958) was a Labour Party politician in the United Kingdom.

== Life ==
A compositor, as his father had been, Naylor was educated at a London Board School and Working Men's College. He became a journalist.

In 1906 Naylor succeeded C. W. Bowerman as secretary of the London Society of Compositors. Naylor advocated the launch of a daily newspaper that supported the Labour Party. He told the Trades Union Congress in 1907 that the Liberal Party-supporting press, which had been supportive, would not prove adequate to future labour conflicts. During the London printers' strike 1911, he produced the first editions under the Daily Herald title. In producing the Daily Herald as a newspaper rather than a strike sheet, Naylor is considered the paper's founder jointly with H. W. Hobart, both being syndicalist sympathisers, and having the backing of trade union militants. He also supported the separate existence, from 1912, of the Daily Citizen.

In 1915 Naylor became chairman of the London Labour Party, holding the position to 1928. In 1921 he was elected as Member of Parliament for Southwark South East. He lost the seat the following year but regained it, sitting 1923–1931 and 1935–1950. He did not stand for re-election in 1950, and was succeeded in the new Southwark seat by the Labour member for Southwark North, George Isaacs.

In a letter to the South London Press of August 1936, Naylor was strongly critical of remarks by Peter Amigo, his local Catholic bishop. They supported the Italian invasion of Abyssinia, and the Francoist uprising in Spain.

== Works ==
Naylor published:

- Rules and Conduct of Debate
- A Compositor in Canada (1921), reportage on union and left-wing activities; Naylor was a delegate at the 1920 Imperial Press Conference in Ottawa.
- Principles and Practice of Newspaper Make-up

From 1906 to 1938 he edited the London Typographical Journal.

== See also ==
- UK by-election records

Parliament of the United Kingdom
Preceded by James Arthur Dawes	Member of Parliament for Southwark South-East; December 1921 – November 1922	Succeeded by Maurice Alexander
Preceded by Maurice Alexander	Member of Parliament for Southwark South-East; 1923 – 1931	Succeeded by Evelyn George Harcourt Powell
Preceded by Evelyn George Harcourt Powell	Member of Parliament for Southwark South-East; 1935 – 1950	Constituency abolished
Trade union offices
Preceded by C. W. Bowerman	General Secretary of the London Society of Compositors; 1906–1938	Succeeded by Alfred M. Wall
Party political offices
Preceded by Fred Bramley	Chairman of the London Labour Party; 1919–1933	Succeeded by Harold Clay
