= James Dawes (British politician) =

English solicitor, businessman and Liberal Member of Parliament

Member of Parliament for Southwark South East Walworth (1910–1918)
- In office 15 January 1910 – 14 November 1921
- Preceded by: Charles James O'Donnell
- Succeeded by: Thomas Naylor

Personal details
- Born: James Arthur Dawes; 16 June 1866
- Died: 14 November 1921 (aged 55)
- Party: Coalition Liberal (1916–1921)
- Other political affiliations: Liberal (Before 1916)
- Spouse: Violet Pridmore
- Parent: Richard Dawes (father)
- Education: University College, Oxford
- Profession: Solicitor

James Arthur Dawes (16 June 1866 – 14 November 1921) was an English solicitor, businessman and Liberal member of Parliament (MP) from 1910 to 1921.

== Early life and career ==
James Arthur Dawes was the son of Richard Dawes of Castle Hill, Ealing, Middlesex, a solicitor in Angel Court, Throgmorton Street, London. He was educated at Harrow School and University College, Oxford where he gained MA and Bachelor of Civil Law degrees.

== Political career ==
Dawes qualified as a solicitor in 1891 and was admitted to his father's firm, Mssrs. Dawes and Sons, in January 1892 He was later a Justice of the Peace for the County of London. From the outset of the First World War, Dawes served with the Royal Naval Reserve and Royal Naval Volunteer Reserve raising to the rank of acting Commander by 1918. He was engaged in mine-sweeping operations and from July 1918 he served at the Admiralty. Unsurprisingly, one of Dawes recreations was yachting.

=== Southwark and London politics ===
Dawes had a home in Kennington Park Road in Southwark. He took a strong interest in local affairs and was chairman of the Vestry of Newington, the equivalent of a parish council, from 1897 to 1900. Dawes was then the first Mayor of the Borough of Southwark from 1900 to 1901 and Deputy Mayor the following year. He was re-elected mayor in 1913–14 and 1914–15. He also served as a founder member of the Metropolitan Water Board in 1903–1904. He was later elected as a member of the London County Council for the Progressive Party for Newington Walworth for various years between 1906 and 1913. In 1911 Dawes was appointed to the joint committee of the two Houses of Parliament to consider the bill promoted by the Metropolitan Water Board to construct a series of new works and reservoirs on the River Thames at Staines. From 1912 to 1914 he was chairman of the Insurance Committee for the County of London, created to administer the medical aspects of the National Insurance Act 1911, which for the first time established compulsory contributory insurance against illness and unemployment for workers. Dawes Street, London SE 17 was named after him to commemorate his appointment as the first Mayor of the Borough of Southwark.

=== Parliament ===
By 1908 Dawes had been selected as prospective Liberal candidate for Walworth in succession to Charles James O'Donnell who had decided not to contest the next election. Dawes was duly elected as Liberal MP for Walworth at the general election of January 1910. He held the seat with a slightly increased majority in December 1910. In 1918 his constituency disappeared in boundary changes but he was selected for the new local constituency of Southwark South East. He fought the 1918 general election as a Coalition Liberal, that is as a supporter of the Coalition Government of Prime Minister David Lloyd George. He presumably received the Coalition Coupon because he was not opposed by a Unionist candidate and won in a straight fight with Labour.

== Personal life ==
In 1920 he married Violet Pridmore from Penge in Surrey. They do not appear to have had children.

=== Death ===
On 9 November 1921 Dawes was chosen as Mayor of Dartmouth in Devon where he had his country home. His appointment was not to last long however as he died on 14 November 1921 at Sydenham at the age of 55 years. His death caused a by-election in Southwark which was won by Thomas Naylor for Labour. Dawes was buried in the churchyard at Perivale, a suburb of Ealing.

== Works ==
Dawes wrote two associated pamphlets on National Insurance for the Liberal Party.

- National Health Insurance: Part 1 of the National Insurance Act 1911 – Liberal Publications Dept, 1912
- National Health Insurance: Part 2 of the National Insurance Act 1911 – Liberal Publications Dept, 1912

Dawes also published a Dissertation on the Law of Partnership in 1909 and was a co-author of the Report of the National Committee to Promote the Break-up of the Poor Law in 1910.

Parliament of the United Kingdom
Preceded by Charles James O'Donnell	Member of Parliament for Walworth; January 1910 – 1918	Constituency abolished
New constituency	Member of Parliament for Southwark South East; 1918 – 1921	Succeeded by Thomas Naylor
