= Edward Friend =

British trade union leader

Edward Nicholas Friend (died 14 February 1948), also known as Teddy Friend, was a British trade union leader.

Friend worked in London as a bookbinder, specialising in binding account books using vellum. This was a small but established trade, and he joined a craft union, the Vellum (Account Book) Binders' Trade Society. Friend was an early supporter of the Labour Representation Committee and its successor, the Labour Party, in which union president Frederick Rogers was prominent. Friend was also secretary of the Shoreditch Labour League.

Pay and conditions for the vellum binders lagged behind those of other bookbinders, and by 1907, the union was strongly in favour of amalgamating with other, larger, unions in the trade. In 1909, Friend was elected as general secretary of the vellum binders, and he championed a merger between his union, the Bookbinders and Machine Rulers' Consolidated Union, the Society of Day-working Bookbinders of London, Westminster, etc and the London Consolidated Society of Journeymen Bookbinders. This occurred at the start of January 1911, with the formation of the National Union of Bookbinders and Machine Rulers, and Friend becoming full-time secretary of its vellum binders' branch. He immediately became known as a critical voice in the union, arguing that the union's campaign for shorter working hours was poorly co-ordinated, and complaining that the letterpress branches had not taken part in action, as they already had a 48-hour week.

In 1913, with Friend's support, the vellum binders' branch of the union was merged with three other London branches of the union, and Friend became its full-time organiser. He already represented the union on the London Trades Council, and his new role gave him enough time that, in 1914, he became the chair of the trades council.

In 1917, the union moved its headquarters to London, and for the first time elected an executive, with Friend becoming one of four London representatives. In 1921, the union became part of the National Union of Printing, Bookbinding and Paper Workers (NUPBPW), with Friend remaining an organiser and executive member. He also remained chair of the London Trades Council, and thereby played a major role in organising workers in London during the 1926 UK general strike.

Friend retired late in 1940, and was the first employee of the NUPBPW to receive a pension from the union. He died early in 1948.

Trade union offices
Preceded by A. Goodhew	General Secretary of the Vellum (Account Book) Binders' Trade Society; 1909–1910	Succeeded by Union merged
Preceded by John Stokes	Chair of the London Trades Council; 1914–1940	Succeeded by George Lindgren
