= William Morrison =

William Morrison may refer to:

== Arts and literature ==
- William McKenzie Morrison (1857–1921), American photographer
- William Morrison (poet) (1881–1973), Irish poet
- Joseph Samachson or William Morrison (1906–1980), science-fiction writer
- William Morrison (director), Canadian music video director and musician

== Business ==
- William Morrison (trader) (1785–1866), fur trader in Old Crow Wing, Minnesota
- William Morrison (businessman) (1874–1956), English founder of supermarket chains

== Politics ==
- William Morrison (American politician), member of the North Carolina General Assembly of 1779
- William Ralls Morrison (1824–1909), U.S. Representative from Illinois
- William Robert Morrison (1878–1947), Canadian politician and mayor of Hamilton, Ontario
- William Morrison (Alberta politician) (1891–1970), member of the Legislative Assembly of Alberta
- William Morrison, 1st Viscount Dunrossil (1893–1961), British politician and governor general of Australia
- William McG. Morrison (1903–1960), mayor of Charleston, South Carolina
- Bill Morrison (politician) (William Lawrence Morrison, 1928–2013), member of the Australian House of Representatives
- William Morrison (British Columbia politician), politician in Lillooet, British Columbia
- Bill Morrison (trade unionist) (William Alfred Morrison), British trade union leader

== Science ==
- William Morrison (gardener), plant collector employed by Kew, 1824–1839
- William Morrison (chemist) (1850-1927), Scotland-born inventor of the first U.S. practical electrical car
- William Morrison (dentist) (1860–1926), American dentist

== Sports ==
- William Morrison (cricketer) (1850–1910), New Zealand cricketer
- William Morrison (rugby union) (1875-1944), Scotland international rugby union player
- Billy Morrison (footballer) (William Morrison, 1879–?), Scottish footballer
- Willie Morrison (William Morrison, 1934–2001), Scottish footballer

== Other people ==
- William Vitruvius Morrison (1794–1838), Irish architect
- William Morrison (missionary) (1867–1918), American missionary based in the Congo Free State
- William V. Morrison (1906–1977), American lawyer, probate investigator, and genealogical researcher
- William R. Morrison (historian) (born 1942), Canadian historian of the Canadian North
- William Garth Morrison (1943–2013), chief scout of the United Kingdom and Overseas Territories

== See also ==
- Bill Morrison (disambiguation)
- William Morison (disambiguation)
