= National Union of Paper Mill Workers =

The National Union of Paper Mill Workers (NUPMW) was a trade union representing labourers in paper mills in the United Kingdom.

The union was founded on 1 February 1890, and based itself at Hulme near Manchester. Unlike the rival United Brotherhood of Paper Makers, it accepted workers regardless of perceived level of skill, and the bulk of its members were in lower paid roles. William Ross was appointed as the union's secretary, holding the post unopposed until 1919, and then winning an election with a large majority over two other candidates.

The union's membership grew steadily, and by 1914, it had just under 6,000 members. The Scottish Operative Papermakers' Trade Protection Society, which had dissolved in 1873, left some remaining funds, which were passed to the NUPMW in 1894.

The union attempted to arrange a merger with the Amalgamated Society of Papermakers, successor of the United Brotherhood, in 1897, and again in 1905, without success. In 1914, it instead merged with the National Amalgamated Society of Printers' Warehousemen and Cutters and the United Vellum and Parchment Makers of Great Britain, to form the National Union of Printing and Paper Workers.
