= Bill Spackman =

E. W. Spackman (1882 – 17 December 1955), known as Bill Spackman, was a British trade unionist.

Spackman left school at the age of thirteen, and took his first job running errands for printers. In time, he became a printer himself, and joined the National Union of Printing and Paper Workers. This merged into the National Union of Printing, Bookbinding, Machine Ruling and Paper Workers, and Spackman became chair of its London Central branch, then secretary of the union's printing and paper-making section. When the union was reorganised, he became its organising secretary, then in 1939 he was elected as general secretary.

Spackman was also a member of the executive of the Printing and Kindred Trades Federation, chairing it for some years, and also served as chair of the Printing Trades Joint Industrial Council.

In 1945, Spackman was elected to the General Council of the Trades Union Congress. He retired from all his union posts in 1947, serving in his retirement on the Dental Estimates Board.

Trade union offices
Preceded by Tom Newland	General Secretary of the National Union of Printing, Bookbinding, Machine Ruling and Paper Workers; 1939–1947	Succeeded by Bill Morrison
Preceded by George Isaacs	Printing and Paper Group representative on the General Council of the TUC; 1945 – 1947	Succeeded by Robert Willis
