= H. R. King =

British trade union leader

Henry R. King (c. 1826 – 18 October 1903) was a British trade union leader. He was a leading advocate for women's trade unionism who served for many years as treasurer of the London Trades Council.

== Career ==
King worked as a bookbinder, and joined the London Consolidated Society of Journeymen Bookbinders, a long established union, led by Thomas Dunning. Dunning suffered an accident in 1871, and as a result, King was in his place appointed as secretary to a joint committee campaigning for a maximum nine hour working day. The committee brought together the London Consolidated Society together with the Dayworking Bookbinders Society and the Bookbinders' Consolidated Union, and quickly achieved its aim.

By 1873, Dunning's health had not improved, and he had to resign as secretary of the London Consolidated Society. Following his success with the nine hour day campaign, King was elected as his successor. He was also elected as treasurer of the London Trades Council, and in 1874 he was a founder member of the Women's Trade Union League. His support of women's trade unionism was not shared by everyone in the movement, and led to a major dispute in 1883, when the London Consolidated Society ignored requests from the Dublin branch of the Consolidated Union for support in a strike opposing the employment of women bookbinders in the city. A committee of the Trades Union Congress was assembled, and the London Consolidated Society was required to pay some costs of the Dublin branch.

== Later years ==
Under King's leadership, the union's membership grew steadily, reaching 1,240 by 1896. He retired in 1899, and was granted a pension of 30 shillings per week. He died four years later.

Trade union offices
Preceded by Thomas Dunning	General Secretary of the London Consolidated Lodge of Journeymen Bookbinders; 1873–1899	Succeeded by William Coffey
Preceded by Edwin Coulson and James Fitzpatrick	Auditor of the Trades Union Congress; 1876; With: John Inglis	Succeeded by W. J. Davis and John P. Walker
