= Alfred Evans (trade unionist) =

Alfred Evans (1851 or 1852 – 17 August 1918) was a British trade union organiser.

Evans was general secretary of the Printers' and Stationers' Warehousemen, Cutters and Assistants' Union from its formation in 1889. He took the union through a series of mergers; notably, the National Bookfolders' and Kindred Trades Union joined, giving the union a significant female membership. Evans became a keen advocate of women's trade unionism.

In 1914, Evans took the Warehousemen and Cutters into a further merger, forming the National Union of Printing and Paper Workers, and he again became general secretary of the new union. In this role, he promoted the construction of a large convalescent home for workers in Carshalton, which was completed before the end of World War I.

Evans also held various posts in the broader union movement: he was a member of the Parliamentary Committee of the Trades Union Congress from 1911 until 1915, served on the executive of the Printing and Kindred Trades Federation, and also as its London District Secretary.

Trade union offices
Preceded by New position	General Secretary of the National Amalgamated Society of Printers' Warehousemen and Cutters; 1899 – 1914	Succeeded by Position abolished
Preceded by New position	General Secretary of the National Union of Printing and Paper Workers; 1914 – 1918	Succeeded by Tom Newland
