= Tom Newland =

British trade union leader

Thomas George Newland (2 February 1872 – 14 September 1943) was a British trade union leader.

Born in Islington, Newland served with the City Imperial Volunteers during the Second Boer War. After the war, he returned to the UK, where in 1893 he joined the National Amalgamated Society of Printers' Warehousemen and Cutters. He was elected to the union's London Branch Committee in 1901. He first came to prominence in 1905, when he moved a motion in opposition to affiliation to the Labour Representation Committee, objecting to the organisation's support of the middle class candidate Stanton Coit while it did not endorse the candidature of Harry Quelch, a member of the union, who shared Newland's membership of the Social Democratic Federation.

Newland was elected as the union's national president in 1908, and became branch secretary the following year. In 1918, he was elected as general secretary of its successor, the National Union of Printing and Paper Workers, which he took into a merger to form the larger National Union of Printing, Bookbinding and Paper Workers, continuing as general secretary.

As leader of the paper workers, Newland served on the executive of the Printing and Kindred Trades Federation, and the Joint Industrial Council for the industry. In his spare time, he served as a magistrate, and he was also a Freeman of the City of London.

Newland retired in 1938, and died five years later. The union renamed its convalescent home in Filey in his memory.

Trade union offices
Preceded by R. H. Swift	President of the National Amalgamated Society of Printers' Warehousemen and Cutters; 1908–1909	Succeeded by R. H. Swift
Preceded by Alfred Evans	General Secretary of the National Union of Printing and Paper Workers; 1918–1921	Succeeded by Position abolished
Preceded by New position	General Secretary of the National Union of Printing, Bookbinding, Machine Ruling and Paper Workers; 1921–1938	Succeeded by Bill Spackman
