= George Davy Kelley =

British trades unionist and politician (1848–1911)

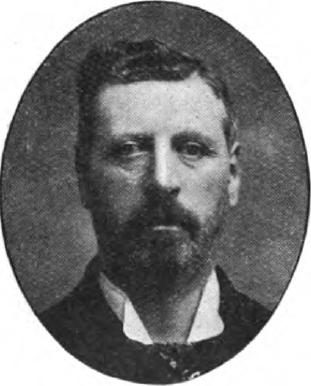
Kelley in the mid-1900s

George Davy Kelley (1848 – 18 December 1911) was a British trades unionist and Labour politician.

Kelley was born in Ruskington, Lincolnshire in 1848. He became apprenticed to the lithographic printing trade in York. Following his apprenticeship, he worked as a printer in London, Birmingham, Leeds and Bradford. He moved to Manchester to become general secretary of the Amalgamated Society of Lithographic Printers, formed in 1880.

Kelley was an early proponent of the Labour movement putting forward candidates for election. He became vice-president of the Labour Electoral Association in 1889, and presided at the Labour Electoral Congress held in Hanley in 1890. He was elected to the parliamentary committee of the Trades Union Congress in 1892.

He held the office of secretary of a number of bodies: the Manchester Trades and Labour Council, the Lancashire and Cheshire Federation of Trade Councils, the Manchester and District Board of Conciliation and the National Printing and Kindred Trades Federation.

In 1902 he travelled to New York City as part of Alfred Moseley's Commission of Inquiry into the organisation of Labour. Two years later as vice-chairman of the National Committee of Organised Labour, he campaigned for the introduction of a universal old age pension.

At the 1906 general election he was selected as one of the Labour Representation Committee candidates, and was elected as member of parliament for Manchester South West, unseating the sitting Conservative MP. Due to ill-health he retired from parliament at the next general election in January 1910. He died in Manchester in December 1911, aged 63.

Parliament of the United Kingdom
Preceded by William Johnson Galloway	Member of Parliament for Manchester South West; 1906 – January 1910	Succeeded by Arthur Colefax
Trade union offices
Preceded by New position	General Secretary of the Amalgamated Society of Lithographic Printers; 1879–1911	Succeeded by Thomas Sproat
Preceded by Peter Shorrocks	Secretary of the Manchester and Salford Trades Council; 1883–1906	Succeeded by Tom Fox
Preceded by Thomas Ashton and John Wilson	Auditor of the Trades Union Congress; 1885; With: Joseph Hope	Succeeded by T. J. Elvidge and Ben Pickard
Preceded by New position	General Secretary of the Printing and Kindred Trades Federation; 1891–1911	Succeeded by A. E. Holmes
Preceded by Charles Harrap	General Secretary of the International Federation of Lithographers and Kindred Trades; 1900–1907	Succeeded by Otto Sillier
