= Robert Banner =

Robert Banner may refer to:

- Robert Bruce Banner, birth name of Hulk
- Bob Banner (1921–2011), American producer, writer and director
- Robert Banner (socialist) (1855–1910), Scottish socialist politician and trade unionist
