= Bill Morrison =

Bill Morrison or Billy Morrison is the name of:

- Bill Morrison (director) (born 1965), American filmmaker
- Bill Morrison (comics) (born 1959), co-founder of Bongo Comics
- Bill Morrison (politician) (1928–2013), Australian politician for the Division of St George
- Bill Morrison (trade unionist) (fl. from 1938), British trade union leader
- Billy Morrison (born 1969), British guitarist and singer
- Billy Morrison (footballer), footballer for Fulham F.C. 1904–1908

== See also ==
- Bill Mollison (1928–2016), Australian researcher, author, scientist, teacher, and biologist
- William Morrison (disambiguation)
