= National Society of Electrotypers and Stereotypers =

Former trade union of the United Kingdom

- Merged into: National Graphical Association
- Founded: October 1893
- Dissolved: 30 October 1967
- Headquarters: 80 Blackfriars Road, London
- Location: United Kingdom
- Members: 5,056 (1966)
- Key people: Walter C. Warren (Gen Sec)
- Affiliations: TUC, P&KTF, Labour

The National Society of Electrotypers and Stereotypers (NSES) was a trade union representing workers in print foundries in the United Kingdom.

The union was founded in October 1893 as the Federated Society of Electrotypers and Stereotypers by various local unions. The London-based Stereotypers' and Electrotypers' Assistants' Society, also formed in 1893, did not join, although by 1914, the National Society had far more members in London than the Assistants' Society had in total. That year, the Assistants voted against merging into the National Society, and instead decided to dissolve their union, and encourage its members to join a new Electrotypers and Stereotypers section of the National Society of Operative Printers and Assistants (NATSOPA). The Federated Society took advantage of the situation by renaming itself as the Federated Society of Electrotypers, Stereotypers and Assistants, and by the end of 1915, it had more than 1,800 members, including more than 1,000 in London.

In 1917, the Federated Society renamed itself as the National Society of Electrotypers, Stereotypers and Assistants in 1917, and by 1919 it was sufficiently dominant that NATSOPA agreed to transfer its Electrotypers and Stereotypers section to the National Society. By the mid-1920s, membership had risen to 3,400, growing to a peak of more than 5,000 by the early 1960s. By this point the move away from letterpress printing and a fall in print advertising was reducing the number of jobs in the industry. In response, the society advocated that the six main unions in the trade, all members of the Printing and Kindred Trades Federation, should merge. The idea was not taken up until many years later, but on 30 October 1967, the union merged into the National Graphical Association.

== General Secretaries ==
1911: Walter C. Warren
1952: Alf Buckle
