= Amalgamated Society of Lithographic Printers =

Former trade union of the United Kingdom

- Predecessor: Central Association of Lithographic and Copper-Plate Printers' Societies
- Merged into: National Graphical Association
- Founded: 1879
- Dissolved: 1969
- Headquarters: 137 Dickenson Road, Rusholme, Manchester
- Location(s): United Kingdom and Ireland
- Members: 11,895 (1968)
- Key people: George Davy Kelley (Gen Sec)
- Affiliations: TUC, ITUC, P&KTF

The Amalgamated Society of Lithographic Printers (ASLP) was a trade union representing printers and their assistants in the United Kingdom and Ireland.

== History ==
The Central Association of Lithographic and Copper-Plate Printers' Societies was founded in or before 1860 by local trade unions, in Belfast, Dublin, Edinburgh, Glasgow, Liverpool, Manchester and Sheffield. Unions in Bradford and Stockport later joined, and in 1879 the Bradford and Manchester unions took the initiative in establishing a new, centralised union. This was the Amalgamated Society of Lithographic Printers and Auxiliaries, based in Manchester.

The union initially had about 500 members, but it grew rapidly under the leadership of George Davy Kelley, setting up its own offices in Manchester. The Manchester branch ran the union, with it electing the entire executive until 1914. Membership grew to about 3,500 by 1900, and reached 5,168 in 1915. In 1930, it was further boosted when the Litho Music Printers merged into the ASLP.

In the 1950s and 1960s, there was a boom in lithographic printing, and although it led membership to increase to 11,000, the union worried that it would lose control of the trade. As a result, in 1969, it merged into the National Graphical Association.

== Election results ==
The union sponsored its general secretary as a Labour Party candidate in the 1906 UK general election.

Constituency	Candidate	Votes	Percentage	Position
Manchester South West	George Davy Kelley	4,101	58.8	1

== General Secretaries ==
1879: George Davy Kelley
1912: Thomas Sproat
1931: F. F. Boaler
1937: R. T. Williams
1958: Stanley Gilman
1960: Ron Emerick
