= Walter C. Warren =

British trade union leader

Walter Clark Warren (1880 – 2 November 1952) was a British trade union leader.

Born in Peckham, Warren completed an apprenticeship with Cassell as an electrotyper and joined the Federated Society of Electrotypers and Stereotypers in 1901. He was elected as general secretary of the union in 1911, and he championed merging it with the London-based Stereotypers' and Electrotypers' Assistants' Society, to create a single union for the craft. While the London-based union voted against a merger, instead joining the rival National Society of Operative Printers and Assistants (NATSOPA), the Federated Society took advantage of the situation, renaming itself in 1917 as the National Society of Electrotypers, Stereotypers and Assistants (NSES), and in 1919 the assistants transferred from NATSOPA into the NSES.

As general secretary of the NSES, Warren served on the executive committee of the Printing and Kindred Trades Federation (P&KTF), eventually being elected as its vice-president, and then in 1945 as its president. He also served on the Joint Industrial Council for the printing industry from its formation, and served as its chair in 1926/27. In addition, he served on the governing board of the London School of Printing, was a member of the committee which drafted the constitution of the International Graphical Federation, and was a liveryman of the Worshipful Company of Stationers and Newspaper Makers.

In 1946, Warren was made a Commander of the Order of the British Empire. He resigned from his P&KTF post early in 1952 due to poor health, and died later in the year.

Trade union offices
| Preceded by ? | General Secretary of the National Society of Electrotypers and Stereotypers; 1911–1952 | Succeeded by Alf Buckle |
| Preceded by George Isaacs | President of the Printing and Kindred Trades Federation; 1945–1952 | Succeeded by R. T. Williams |
