= London Consolidated Lodge of Journeymen Bookbinders =

Former trade union of the United Kingdom

The London Consolidated Lodge of Journeymen Bookbinders was a trade union representing bookbinders based in London.

In 1839, there were three lodges of bookbinders in London, and they undertook a thirty-week strike to limit the number of apprentices being taken on. This was broadly successful, as the masters agreed to recognise the workers' right to unionise, and some limits were placed on future numbers of apprentices.

Thomas Dunning emerged as the leading figure in the London bookbinders, and he used the prestige of the successful strike to convince the national Bookbinders' Consolidated Relief Fund to reorganise as a more centralised organisation, the Bookbinders' Consolidated Union. He also convinced the three London lodges of bookbinders to merge, with the plan of taking over the management of the union, but after they did so, they found that the Consolidated Union's finances were in a worse state than expected, and so the London Consolidated Lodge instead became a separate union.

While the Consolidated Union continued to represent bookbinders outside London, Dunning steadfastly refused all proposals to merge the London Consolidated Lodge into it. He remained secretary of the lodge until 1873, when he was severely injured by being hit by a vehicle, and continued to edit the union's journal, the Circular, until his death in 1875.

In later years, the union became known as the London Consolidated Society of Journeymen Bookbinders. It supported the eight-hour movement, and was a founding member of the Printing and Kindred Trades Federation. On 1 January 1911, it finally merged with the Bookbinders' and Machine Rulers' Consolidated Union, the Society of Day-working Bookbinders of London and the Vellum (Account Book) Binders' Trade Society, to form the National Union of Bookbinders and Machine Rulers.

== General Secretaries ==
1840: Thomas Dunning
1873: H. R. King
1899: William Coffey
