= Andreas Scheu =

Austrian socialist (1844–1927)

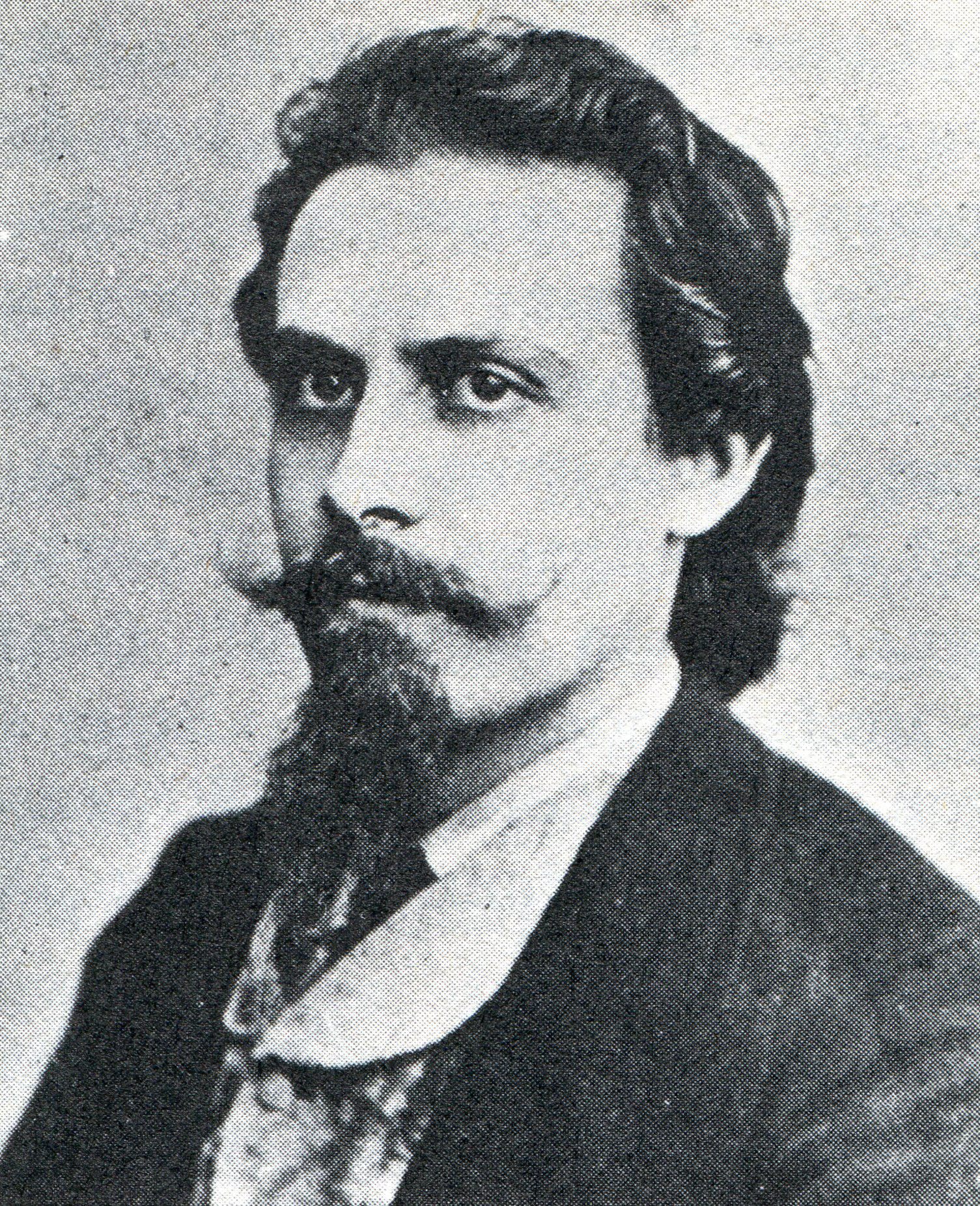
Scheu

Andreas Scheu (27 January 1844 – 29 August 1927) was an Austrian socialist activist.

Born in Vienna, Scheu completed an apprenticeship as a gilder and furniture maker. He worked in Vienna as a journeyman, then in 1861 moved to Prague for a year. On returning to Vienna, he found work with the leading furniture maker, Benedikt Kölbl.

Scheu had become interested in pacifism, and when he was called up for military service in 1864, he planned to become a conscientious objector. However, he was rejected for service on the grounds of poor eyesight.

In 1867, Scheu represented Kölbl's firm at the Exposition Universelle in Paris, and while there he met Thérèse Arocker, the two marrying in May. Despite Arocker's opposition, on returning to Austria, Scheu became increasingly involved in the workers' movement, joining the Workers' Educational Association, organising a workers' exhibition in the city in 1868, co-founding the Volkswille newspaper, and speaking publicly on socialism.

Scheu joined the International Workingmen's Association in 1869, and attended the Eisenach Congress which saw the foundation of the German Social Democratic Workers' Party. In 1870, he was one of seventeen leaders of the Austrian workers' movement convicted of treason and sentenced to five years penal servitude. He was released after just one year, as part of an amnesty, and became increasingly outspoken in his political views, arguing against any co-operation with the middle and upper classes. He fell out with Heinrich Oberwinder, who lost a lengthy court case to Scheu, but Scheu promised that he would not stand in the way of attempts to reunify the Austrian socialist movement. Also facing harassment from the government and financial problems, Scheu moved to London in June 1874, where his brother Heinrich worked for the Daily Graphic.

In London, Scheu initially became involved with two groups of socialist immigrants, but became convinced that he could achieve more by focusing on British workers. He moved to Glasgow and then Edinburgh, working for furniture designers, and spoke regularly on socialism, convincing John Burns and Robert Banner of his ideas. He returned to London in 1881, where his friend Johann Most was now living, helping him with editing Freiheit, and also struck up a friendship with Bernard Shaw. He joined the Democratic Federation and served on its executive from at least 1883, working with Joseph Lane and William Morris to oppose H. M. Hyndman's nationalism and authoritarianism. They appeared to succeed at the organisations 1884 conference, at which it declared itself to be a socialist organisation, renamed itself as the "Social Democratic Federation" (SDF), and Scheu won election as president.

After the 1884 conference, Scheu returned to work in Edinburgh. There, John Lincoln Mahon persuaded Scheu that the SDF would not succeed unless it linked up with the crofters' movement, and so the pair formed the Scottish Land and Labour League, intending that it would affiliate to the SDF. Hyndman disagreed with this policy, and urged the local SDF to refuse the league permission to affiliate. On Morris' urging, Scheu visited London in December, to defend his actions, against Hyndman. Scheu had already been urging his supporters to split from the SDF, and this proved the trigger for this, launching Commonweal at the end of the year, then forming the Socialist League, with Scheu sitting on its provisional council and drafting its manifesto. Despite claims to the contrary by Hyndman and his supporters, Scheu was not an anarchist, and when anarchists came to run the Socialist League, he resigned from the party.

Scheu was one of the first employees of Jaeger, from 1884, serving until 1891, when he began representing the Löwenbräu Brewery. He reduced his activism, but wrote for Justice under the pseudonym "Andrew Joy", and lectured occasionally for the Hammersmith Socialist Society. He retired in 1911, moving to Weimar, but opposed World War I and so in 1915 relocated to Switzerland. He enthusiastically supported the October Revolution and ensuing uprisings in Germany and Austria, and wrote an autobiography, Umsturzkeime, published in 1923. His health declined, and in 1927 he died in Rapperswil.
