= J. Frank Dalton =

Impostor who claimed to be Jesse James (1848–1951)

- Born: John Frank Dalton; March 8, 1848
- Died: August 15, 1951 (aged 103); Granbury, Texas, U.S.
- Known for: Claimed to be Frank Dalton and Jesse James

John Frank Dalton (March 8, 1848 – August 15, 1951) was an American impostor and centenarian who drew notice late in life by successively claiming to be two long-dead famous Western historical figures, lawman Frank Dalton and outlaw Jesse James.

In the late 1930s and early 1940s, J. Frank Dalton attracted considerable attention by telling tales of being Deputy U.S. Marshal Frank Dalton (1859–1887). After historians confronted him with compelling evidence to the effect that he definitely could not be the same man as Marshal Frank Dalton, starting in April 1948 in Lawton, Oklahoma, he took up claiming to be Jesse James (1847–1882) instead. J. Frank Dalton was allegedly over 100 years old at the time of his first public appearance as Jesse James at Lawton, claiming in an affidavit that he had been a member of Quantrill's guerrillas during the Civil War. Though he convinced several people of note, such as journalist/novelist Robert Ruark, extensive research by historians has never been able to verify Dalton's claims, and recent DNA evidence supports the traditional account of James's 1882 death (this report has been heavily disputed by a book written by distant relatives of Jesse James). J. Frank Dalton died in Texas in 1951.

== Claim to be Deputy U. S. Marshal Frank Dalton ==
The true origin of J. Frank Dalton remains obscure, and his claimed name, which is identical to the full name of U.S. Marshal Frank Dalton, was perhaps just an alias. Ed Bartholomew, a rare book dealer and Old West historian, would relate that Dalton was using the nickname "the Kid" when they first met at a 1933 Corpus Christi old-timers' convention and said he remembered at least one local paper drawing the possible connection between Dalton and Billy the Kid. He also said that Dalton was going by the name of Dolby at the time. In a 1936 family history, a man who referred to himself as "Frank Dalton" wrote in detail about the death of Jesse James, claiming that he (Dalton) was present when reporters, law enforcement officers, and locals gathered to witness the scene, and where James's murderer Bob Ford confessed. The author of the account seems to question the accepted historical narrative surrounding the outlaw's death. He goes on to say that he is aware of others' efforts to pose as James. It is uncertain whether the author of this account is the same man as the later Marshal Dalton/Jesse James impostor J. Frank Dalton.

While a resident of the Roper Hotel in Marble Falls, Texas, in the early 1940s, J. Frank Dalton claimed to be the famous lawman of the Old West named J. (John) Franklin "Frank" Dalton, who from 1884 until his death in 1887 had served as Deputy U.S. Marshal for the Western District of Arkansas, administered out of Fort Smith, Arkansas, with jurisdiction including the Oklahoma Territory or Indian Territory. He had previously made such claims while living in Independence County, Arkansas. Contrary to J. Frank Dalton's claims, the marshal was shot and killed in the line of duty on November 27, 1887, in a gun battle with members of the Smith-Dixon Gang.

== Claim to be Jesse James ==
Following the death of Jesse James hoaxer William John James in 1947, Orvus Lee Howk, who claimed to be a grandson of J. Frank Dalton and later renamed himself Jesse Lee James III, engineered Dalton's adoption of a new identity as Old West outlaw Jesse James. Signing himself as J. Frank Dalton, the old man on April 24, 1948, executed an affidavit recounting the details of the historical Jesse James's birth and claimed to be the famous outlaw. The affidavit was published, with additional historical information about James and the claim, in the newspaper The Lawton Constitution the following month. On May 22, 1948, Dalton made two public appearances in Lawton's business district, giving speeches at each location. Dalton posed as Jesse James in front of the crowds and spoke about what life was like in the days of the Old West. This fed into not infrequent claims that Jesse James had faked his 1882 death and then adopted an alias, and Dalton's account incorporated many aspects told by prior Jesse James impostor William John James. James expert Homer Croy went to Lawton and found Dalton unable to answer many questions the authentic James should have known, but Howk continued to promote Dalton as Jesse James.

On hearing of the claim, Rudi Turilli, the manager of Meramec Caverns in Missouri, arranged to bring Dalton to his site and launched a major promotional campaign. It was there that in June 1949, Dalton was interviewed by journalist Robert C. Ruark, who then published a three-article account of this interview. Dalton, claiming to be 102 years old, told Ruark that the man shot and killed in 1882 and identified as Jesse James was actually a similar-looking houseguest of James named Charlie Bigelow. Dalton related that after Bigelow's murder, he fled to Kansas City, Memphis, New Orleans and Florida, then to Brazil, and later to Mexico. He claimed to have eventually returned to Oklahoma, where he was elected to the territorial legislature under the name J. Frank Dalton before relocating to Texas. Dalton's account of himself as Jesse James did not hold up under questioning from James's surviving relatives. A debate between supporter Ruark and critic Croy was broadcast nationally by CBS.

On September 5, 1949, Turilli, along with cavern owner Lester B. Dill, hosted what was claimed to be a 102nd birthday party for Dalton (as Jesse James), also inviting James Russell Davis of Nashville, who claimed to be Cole Younger. A 110-year-old Oklahoma man who claimed to have known both outlaws was invited, and made a positive identification, while a 1930s-era Oklahoma bank robber was also invited. The next day Dalton was posed for a photograph with another Old West pretender, Brushy Bill Roberts, who claimed to be Billy the Kid, and the two would offer mutual support for each other's claims. J. Frank Dalton died on August 15, 1951, in Granbury, Texas, and a post-mortem examination was said to have found several of the distinguishing body marks/features that the real Jesse James was rumored to have had, including numerous bullet wounds, a rope burn around his neck, a damaged fingertip, and severely burned feet. This claim differs from earlier reports that showed Dalton's finger injury was to the wrong finger, and that he had no evident chest wounds, which Howk explained by claiming skin grafts had been performed. Dalton's death certificate was recorded with the name of the man he claimed to be, Jesse Woodson James, the name also appearing on a gravestone erected at his burial site in Granbury Cemetery in 1983.

In 1966 Turilli offered a $10,000 reward for anyone who could prove that Dalton was not James. After the daughter-in-law and grandchildren of the real Jesse James presented their evidence, it ended in a court case in which they were ruled to have satisfied the burden of proof, and Turilli was ordered to pay the reward. The decision was upheld on appeal, but Turilli died in 1972, never paying.

== Exhumations ==
In 1995, the gravesite historically attributed to Jesse James at the Mt. Olivet Cemetery in Kearney, Missouri, was exhumed. The remains were examined and found to be consistent with James's historical record, and mitochondrial DNA analysis performed on the remains were found to match two matrilineal relatives of the historic outlaw, leaving "no scientific basis for doubting" that it was indeed the outlaw Jesse James whose remains had been transferred to Mt. Olivet in 1902 from the gravesite on the James family farm where he had been buried in 1882. This conformed with an earlier handwriting analysis performed in 1986, which concluded that examples of Dalton's handwriting did not match that found in an 1880 letter written by Jesse James.

Beginning in 1996, amateur historian Bud Hardcastle, with the support of 3 sons of James descendant Jesse Cole James, began a push to exhume the Granbury, Texas, grave belonging to Dalton to allow for DNA testing of the remains. The 3 James brothers believed that J. Frank Dalton was their grandfather, and that he was also the real Jesse James. An initial petition to the Hood County, Texas, court was declined that year, but a subsequent request was approved in 2000. During the exhumation, which occurred on May 30, 2000, the investigative team found two coffins at the grave site (a large steel vault, and a wooden casket), and since the exhumation order was restricted to one coffin, that closest to the tombstone (the steel vault) was removed for study. However, when the contents of the steel vault were examined, they proved to be the remains of a one-armed Granbury resident named William Henry Holland, leaving the question of Dalton's genetic identity unanswered.
