= National Union of Printing, Bookbinding and Paper Workers =

Former trade union of the United Kingdom

- Merged into: Society of Graphical and Allied Trades
- Founded: 1921
- Dissolved: 1966
- Headquarters: 74 Nightingale Lane, London
- Location: United Kingdom
- Members: 160,000 (1960)
- Affiliations: TUC, ITUC, P&KTF

The National Union of Printing, Bookbinding and Paper Workers (NUPBPW) was a British trade union.

== History ==
The union was founded in 1921 as the National Union of Printing, Bookbinding, Machine Ruling and Paper Workers when the National Union of Bookbinders and Machine Rulers and the National Union of Printing and Paper Workers merged. The Platen Printing Machine Minders' Society and the London Society of Machine Rulers soon also joined. In 1926, its central London branch broke away, but rejoined in 1931. In 1928, the union dropped "machine ruling" from its name. In 1937 it was joined by the Amalgamated Society of Paper Makers, and in 1948, by the small Original Society of Papermakers.

By 1960, the union over 160,000 members. Following mergers with several small unions, in 1966 it joined with the National Society of Operative Printers and Assistants to form the Society of Graphical and Allied Trades.

== Leadership ==
=== General Secretaries ===
1921: Tom Newland
1938: Bill Spackman
1947: Bill Morrison
1961: Tom Smith

=== General Presidents ===
1921: George Harraway
1938: E. C. Hooker
1950: Cecil Sharp
1954: John Mackenzie
