= Frederick Rogers (bookbinder) =

English bookbinder, trades unionist, writer and journalist

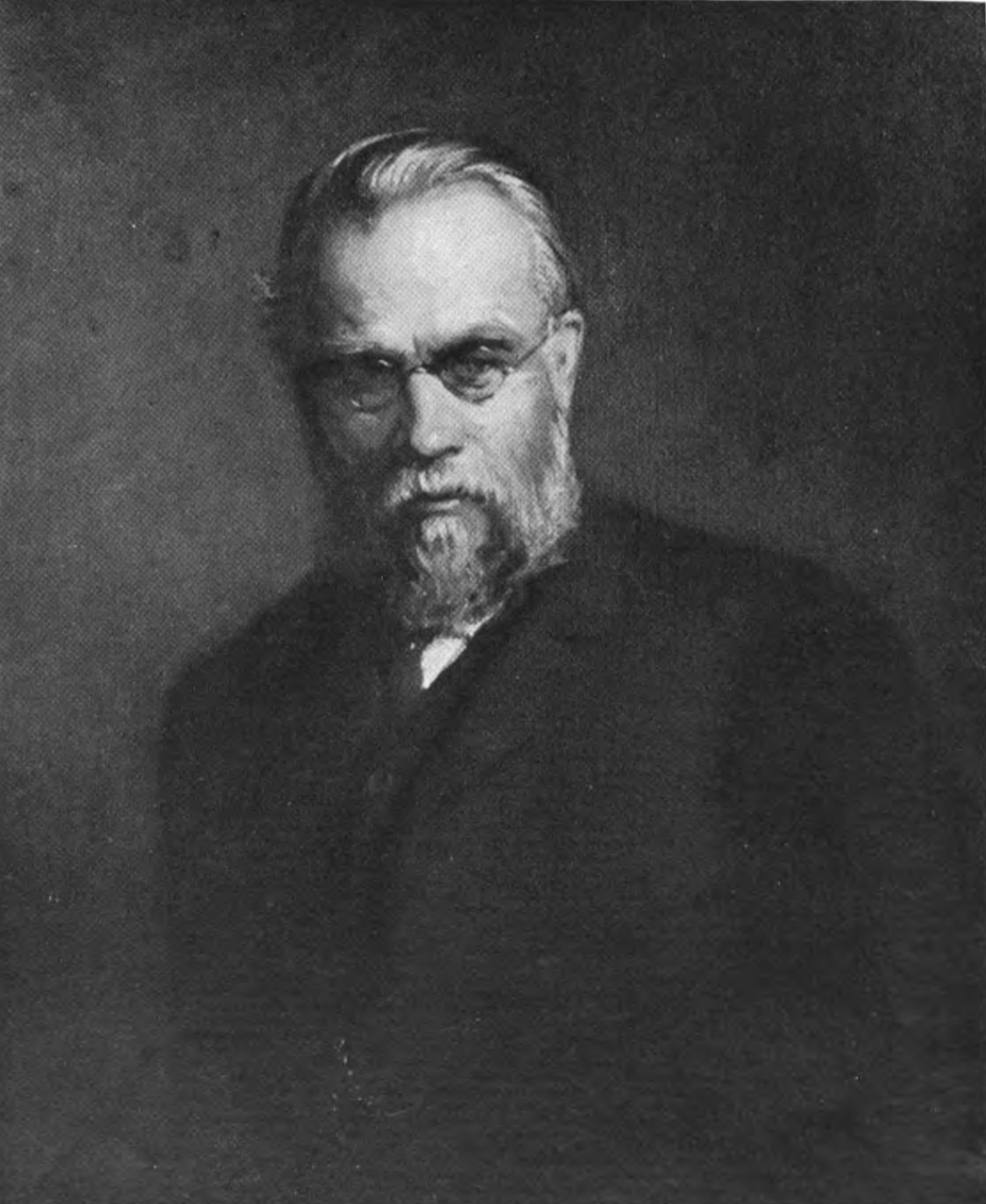
- Portrait of Frederick Rogers by Ernest Stafford Carlos

Chairman of the Labour Representation Committee
- In office 1900–1901
- Preceded by: New position
- Succeeded by: Allen Gee

Personal details
- Born: 27 April 1846 Whitechapel, London, England
- Died: 1915
- Occupation: Bookbinder, trade unionist, writer, journalist

Frederick Rogers (27 April 1846 – 16 November 1915) was an English bookbinder, trades unionist, writer and journalist. He is notable as first chairman of the Labour Representation Committee, the political pressure group to which the Labour Party traces its origins, as well as for a lifetime of work dedicated to educational improvement for the working class, and to the introduction of a general tax-funded system of old-age pensions.

== Biography ==
Rogers was born on 27 April 1846 in Whitechapel, London to a working-class family. His father, also Frederick Rogers, was variously a dock labourer, sailor, and linen drapers assistant; his mother Susan Bartrup a laundress. He left school at or before age 10, and after a period as an ironmonger's boy was employed in a stationery warehouse where he learned the skilled craft of bookbinding. His artisanal career for the next forty years was as a bookbinder specialising in vellum-bound accounts books.

Rogers was an autodidact who pursued four entwined interests through his life: trades unionism, education for the working-class, journalism, and religion. He was also greatly interested in English literature and was considered to be extremely well-read - "the most scholarly man I know in the Labour movement", according to an anonymous writer in a 1909 Railway Review article. Rogers took some pride in having overcome a lack of formal education (and a spinal complaint) in his childhood.

He joined the Vellum (Account Book) Binders' Trade Society in the 1870s whilst working for the Co-Operative Printing Society. In this period, he is mainly noted for his interest in the settlement movement and facilitating the education of working people. He acted as secretary from the outset of the University Extension Movement, working in collaboration with Alfred Milner to encourage universities to deliver lectures in 'extension centres' in cities across the UK. His work, in part, gave rise to Toynbee Hall, a university settlement house delivering education to working people, in which Rogers for many years involved himself, acting as vice-president from 1886 onwards. He was active on the London School Board and within working-men's clubs in east-end London. His work in these fields brought him into the society of reformers such as the Samuel and Henrietta Barnett, and Francis Herbert Stead, founder of the Browning Hall. Direct involvement in the English literature teaching at Toynbee Hall facilitated Rogers' introduction to many socially concerned literary figures of the period.

He became increasingly active as a journalist from the 1880s, writing for many publications and having a column in the Weekly Dispatch. In this guise he was an early advocate of the formation of an independent Labour party. In 1892 he assumed the presidency of the Vellum (Account Book) Trade Society, it having been damaged by failed industrial action, and held the post for the next 6 years. Involvement in unionism at this level propelled him, later, into two notable occupations.

The first was as a Trades Union Congress delegated representative at the February 1900 inaugural meeting of the Labour Representation Committee, which made him their first chairman. The foundation of the LRC is seen as the origin of the British Labour Party. Rogers remained a member of the Committee's executive, acting as treasurer in its third year.

The second, from July 1900, was his service as Organising Secretary of the National Committee of Organised Labour (NECL), which worked to encourage the introduction of old-age pensions funded from general taxation - a campaign won in 1909. The Committee arose out of a campaign of meetings organised by F. H. Stead, known to Rogers through his Settlement movement interests. Stead and Rogers dedicated a decade of work, writing pamphlets and books, lobbying parliament and religious leaders, and travelling the length of the country to speak for the cause.

Rogers was a signatory in March 1901, with many other trades unionists, of a pamphlet opposing the Second Boer War. In contrast he was a proponent of the need to wage World War I, and acted as a speaker at recruitment rallies. He parted company from his liberal and socialist colleagues in the 1901-6 period over disagreements about the future of education, and later served as a Conservative Alderman on London County Council from 1910 to 1911.

Rogers was strong in his religious faith, converting to the Anglo-Catholic movement in the 1890s. His outlook made him additionally useful during his work with the NECL by enabling him to draw support from religious communities for the campaign. His 1903 book, The Seven Deadly Sins, combines his interest in the Christian faith with his great love for Elizabethan literature.

Rogers died, unmarried, in 1915; he lived with his parents until 1907, and thereafter with his sister. An obituary noted the contrast between his outside form - "strange and blurred" - and his character - "sound-hearted, sound-tempered, straight, clear, simple, good ... the most companionable of fellow workers, so reliable, so steady, so right."

== Works ==
Works by Rogers include:

- The Art of Bookbinding, 1894
- The Art of Bookbinding Past and Present, 1899
- Old Age Pensions, 1903
- The Seven Deadly Sins, 1907
- Labour, Life and Literature, 1913

His autobiography, Labour, Life and Literature (1913) is identified as his most important writing work by David Rubinstein in his Oxford Dictionary of National Biography entry, and was highly commended in a short notice in the Labour History Review which found "aspects of his memoirs which lift them well above the average for this class of writing".

== Notes ==
Sources

- Finch, Harold (1992). "Frederick Rogers: Bookbinder and Journalist" (PDF). East London Record (15). East London History Society: 10–14.
