= Brushy Bill Roberts =

American man who claimed to be Billy the Kid (1879–1950)

- Brushy Bill
- Born: August 26, 1879
- Died: December 27, 1950 (aged 71); Hico, Texas, U.S.
- Other name: Oliver L. Roberts
- Occupation: Laborer

Oliver Pleasant Roberts, best known as Brushy Bill Roberts (August 26, 1879 – December 27, 1950; claimed date of birth December 31, 1859), and also known as Ollie Roberts, Ollie P. Roberts, Oliver P. Roberts, O.P. Roberts, or O. L. Roberts, was an American man who attracted attention in the late 1940s and the 1950s by claiming to be Billy the Kid, the Western outlaw killed by Pat Garrett in 1881. Roberts's claim was rejected by New Mexico Governor Thomas J. Mabry in 1950. Brushy Bill's story is promoted by the "Billy the Kid Museum" in his hometown of Hico in Hamilton County, Texas.

== Early life ==
Oliver Pleasant Roberts, also known as "Brushy Bill" Roberts, was born August 26, 1879, in Bates, Sebastian County, Arkansas. His parents were Henry Oliver Roberts and Sara Elizabeth Ferguson Roberts.

== Billy the Kid claims ==
The historian Dale L. Walker writes that a St. Louis paralegal and probate investigator, William V. Morrison, in 1948 located an elderly man named Joe Hines who was living in Florida and had spent time in the New Mexico Territory in the 1870s. The old man claimed that he had fought for the Dolan faction in the Lincoln County War and that Billy the Kid was still alive. According to Walker, he refused to reveal the name that William Bonney had assumed or exactly where he was living. Another historian, Leon Claire Metz, however, writes that the name of Billy the Kid came up often in their discussions, and Hines asserted that Pat Garrett had not killed the Kid, whom he swore was still alive, living in Hamilton, Texas, and calling himself Brushy Bill Roberts. The same year, an elderly man named J. Frank Dalton in Lawton, Oklahoma, claimed to be Jesse James, and also declared that Billy the Kid was still alive in Hamilton, Texas, where he was known as O. L. Roberts.

Morrison tracked down and began a correspondence with Roberts, who eventually "confessed" to being Billy the Kid, and detailed his supposed exploits as an outlaw. He told anecdotes that, if true, would fill in undocumented gaps in many aspects of the life of Billy the Kid. He also asked for Morrison's help in acquiring the full pardon that he claimed he had been promised by New Mexico Governor Lew Wallace in 1879, but which was subsequently withdrawn. He demonstrated his ability to slip out of handcuffs, and said that Pat Garrett had actually shot and killed another gunslinger named Billy Barlow and had passed his body off as Billy the Kid's, which had allowed the Kid to vanish and escape to Mexico. There is no historical record of a "Billy Barlow". The only three witnesses to the alleged killing of the Kid by Pat Garrett were Garrett himself and Deputies John W. Poe and Thomas ("Kip") McKinney.

Roberts told Morrison that he would agree to tell the "whole truth" in exchange for the full pardon that Billy the Kid had been promised by Governor Wallace following the Lincoln County War. Brushy Bill claimed to have been born William Henry Roberts on December 31, 1859, on a cattle drive in Taylor County, near Abilene, but he was known to use several other aliases during his life. An Arizona historian, Marshall Trimble, cites a 1987 letter by Mrs. Geneva Pittmon in which she states that her uncle, the man known as "Brushy Bill", was named Oliver P. Roberts, and that he was born August 26, 1879, according to the family Bible. Writer W. C. Jameson claims that Brushy Bill's actual name was William Henry Roberts, and that Oliver Pleasant Roberts was not the same person as "Brushy Bill". According to Jameson, Roberts's niece definitively stated that her uncle "Brushy Bill" was named Oliver P. Roberts, and was not Billy the Kid.

If Brushy Bill had been born in 1859, he would have been 90 at the time of his death in Hico, Texas. Having been born in 1879, he was only 71 at the time of his death. In 1950, an article in the Austin American Statesman reported that Roberts had claimed to be a member of Jesse James's gang, before deciding to come out as the authentic Billy the Kid. In January 1950, Brushy Bill claimed that he had been a member of the James–Younger Gang as a teenager, and identified J. Frank Dalton as Jesse James.

=== Killing of Billy the Kid ===
According to Jon Tuska, Pete Maxwell, a large landholder and rancher, was so upset by the love affair the Kid was carrying on with his sister Paulita that he notified the authorities of the outlaw's presence in the area. Word was passed on to Poe, who relayed it to Garrett, but the sheriff thought it was dubious. Poe insisted they should investigate so urgently that Garrett relented, and near midnight they approached the Maxwell house. Pete Maxwell was asleep in his bed when Garrett entered his room to rouse him and speak to him while Poe and McKinney waited outside. Poe said afterwards that it was not more than thirty seconds later when he and McKinney saw a partially dressed man approaching the house who addressed them in Spanish: "¿Quién es? Quién es?" (Who is it? Who is it?). Poe and McKinney said nothing and the Kid stepped into the bedroom. Garrett saw only a silhouette, and fired twice. Initially there was some confusion about who had been shot. Moments after the shooting, Poe told Garrett that he had "shot the wrong man".

A crowd had gathered outside Pete Maxwell's bedroom after people were wakened by the sound of gunfire. Garret had not gone back into the bedroom to confirm that he had actually shot Billy the Kid. Deluvina Maxwell, a Navajo woman who had been taken in by the Maxwell family and was very devoted to Billy the Kid, calling him her chiquito (little boy), got a lamp and went into the room with Jesús Silva where they found the lifeless body of the Kid. She began to cry and came outside screaming, ¡Mi chiquito está muerto! (My little boy is dead!) She cursed Garrett roundly, calling him every name she could think of and crying, "You son of a bitch!" John W. Poe recounted later that when he and Garrett went into the room, they found the body of Billy the Kid. Jesús Silva and Deluvina, along with several young Hispanic women, carried Billy's body out and laid it on a workbench. They sealed the bullet hole with a cloth and washed the corpse.

News of the killing spread quickly among residents of Fort Sumner and in the surrounding countryside, and a large number of the Kid's friends attended the wake. The historian Frederick Nolan says that "[p]ractically the whole population attended the funeral". Garrett assembled an official inquest and solidified his claim to the killing and all outstanding rewards. Billy the Kid was buried the next day in the military cemetery associated with Fort Sumner. The original rough wooden grave marker disappeared long ago, most likely in a flooding of the Pecos River. According to the author Richard M. Patterson, another possibility is that his body, along with those of his friends Charlie Bowdre and Tom O'Folliard, was disinterred by the US Army when most of the remains were moved to Santa Fe National Cemetery. Nolan concurs with this opinion, and says further that in 1904 the Pecos flooded its banks and the area was flooded to a depth of four feet for a week, washing away most of the grave markers and headstones. In 1882 a reporter for the Las Vegas Daily Optic described the location of the grave—according to Nolan, the evidence, alongside the reporter's description, suggests that the plot now called his grave is probably closer to the actual location than might be expected.

=== Meeting with governor and death ===
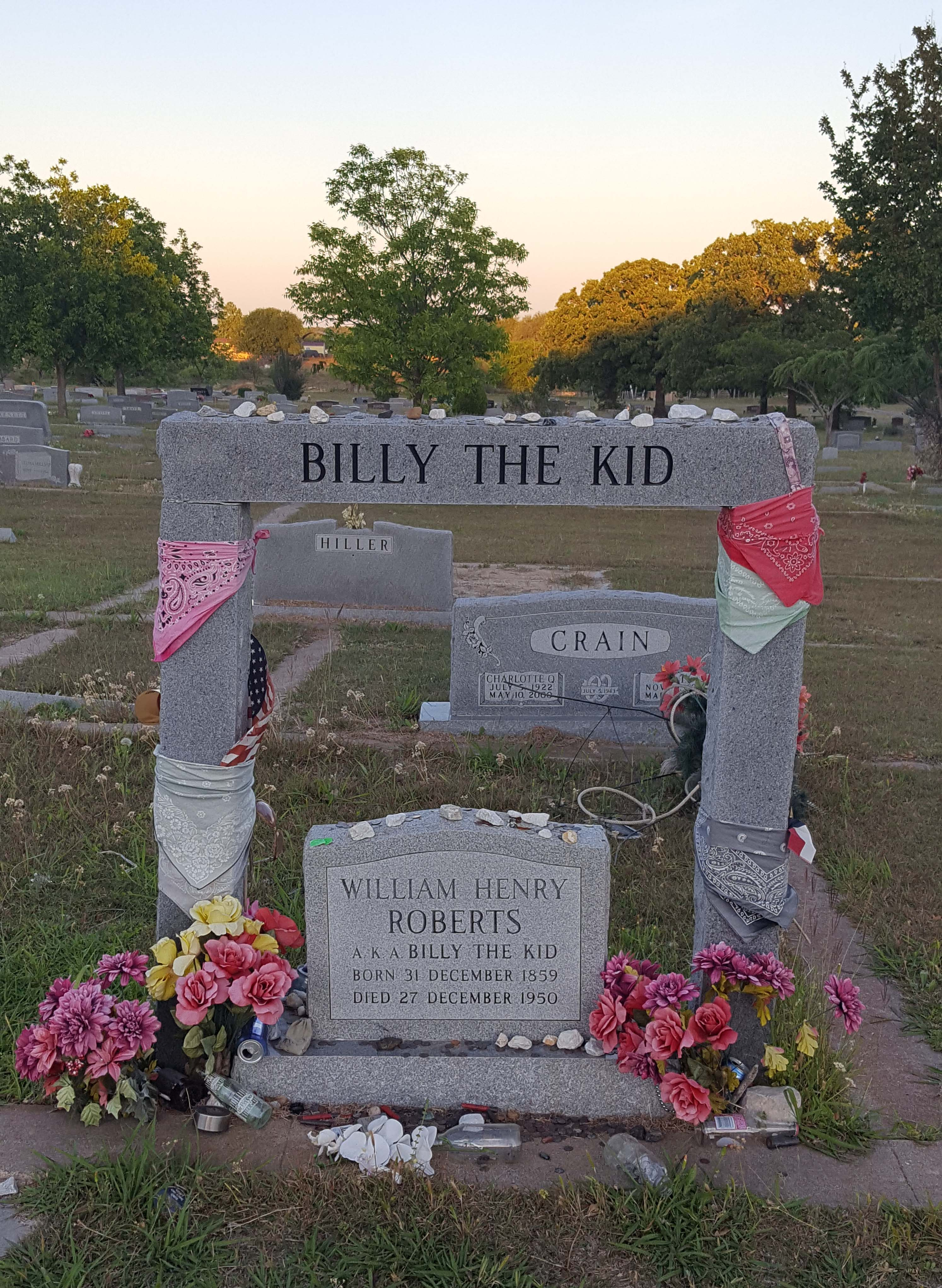
Roberts's gravesite in Hamilton, Texas

Morrison claimed that upon examination of Roberts's stripped body he showed 26 bullet and knife scars. Morrison also attempted to track down former Jesse Evans gang member Jim McDaniels, and located him in Round Rock, Texas. McDaniels, Severo Gallegos, Martile Able and Jose Montoya all knew Billy the Kid, and they signed affidavits verifying their belief that Roberts was, in fact, Billy the Kid. Bill and Sam Jones declined to sign such affidavits, Sam Jones begging off with the statement, "Received your letter, and am sorry but feel that I can't sign your affidavit. I'm old and I just don't feel like being obligated so." Bill Jones's grandson expressed doubts about the veracity of Roberts's claims in a letter of refusal written on his grandfather's behalf. Billy the Kid could read and write English, and he was fluent in spoken Spanish. Roberts was literate, and kept details of his stories in composition books and loose-leaf notebooks, but he spoke very little Spanish.

Governor Mabry had a meeting with Morrison and Roberts at the executive mansion in Santa Fe on November 29, 1950, which was disastrous for the old man. Oscar and Jarvis Garrett, Pat Garret's sons, were present, along with Cliff McKinney, the son of Garrett's deputy, Kip McKinney. Historians and newspaper reporters attended the event as well. Oscar Garrett was provided the opportunity to interrogate Roberts regarding his claims, but he said he chose not to "dignify the occasion" with a reply.

During his testimony with Governor Mabry, Roberts could not remember Pat Garrett's name, nor could he remember places he was supposed to have been. Roy L. Haws, whose great-grandmother was the daughter of Henry Oliver Roberts, Brushy's father, from his first marriage, writes that the meeting "...was by all accounts a ridiculous media event. Brushy, without the benefit of his composition notebooks, could not satisfy even the simplest questions asked." The press ambushed him and under the stress Roberts could hardly speak. Publicly embarrassed and obtaining no pardon from Mabry, he left Santa Fe and returned to his hometown of Hico in Hamilton County, Texas. The ordeal he had undergone left him bedridden for three weeks, and he died of a heart attack soon afterwards, on December 27, 1950. Roberts and his story were largely forgotten until the movie Young Guns II depicted him as the narrator of events surrounding the life and times of Billy the Kid and the Lincoln County War, even though its screenwriter, John Fusco, abhorred Roberts' tale.

At the time of his death, Brushy Bill lived on West 2nd Street in Hico. He was buried in Hamilton, the county seat, 20 miles south of Hico. Despite the discrepancies noted above, the Hico Chamber of Commerce has capitalized on his claim by opening the "Billy the Kid Museum" in the historic Western section of Hico. In the downtown is a marker devoted to Brushy Bill that says: "Ollie L. 'Brushy Bill' Roberts, alias Billy the Kid, died in Hico, Texas, December 27, 1950. He spent the last days of his life trying to prove to the world what he claimed was his true identity, and to obtain the pardon promised to Billy the Kid by the governor of the territory of New Mexico (Lew Wallace)".

=== Photograph ===
According to western writer W.C. Jameson, in 1990, a study utilizing photo comparison equipment in the Advanced Graphic Laboratory in the University of Texas was conducted by image-experts Scott Acton and Alan Bovik. The study corrected for the facial positioning and used the same face recognition techniques used by the FBI, CIA and Interpol which are claimed to provide a "significant level of statistical validity." A photograph alleged to be of a "young William Henry Roberts" were compared to the well known Dedrick-Upham tintype, the only authenticated image of Billy the Kid, and it was found to have large enough discrepancies to be rejected as being of Billy the Kid, but it turned out to be a photograph of a relative. A photograph of an elderly Robertswas compared to the Billy the Kid tintype and found to have enough similarity to suggest a match. In 1996 the results of the study were presented to Andre McNeil, chancery judge of the 12th judicial district, and a prominent Arkansas attorney, Helen Grinder, who stated that based on the study and other evidence the case for Roberts being Billy The Kid was "strong and substantial."

The Lincoln County Heritage Trust later commissioned a computer study by forensic anthropologist Clyde Snow. Scanned photographs of Billy and Roberts, along with those of 150 other people, were fed into a computer utilizing a "similarity index" to match 25 facial "landmarks." This resulted in Roberts' photo ranking 42nd, as 41 other people more closely resembled the tintype than Roberts. Snow indicated that if the two were the same person, then Roberts should have ranked at least 2nd. The accuracy of facial comparisons are reliant on the position of the face in the photographs being the same.

=== DNA ===
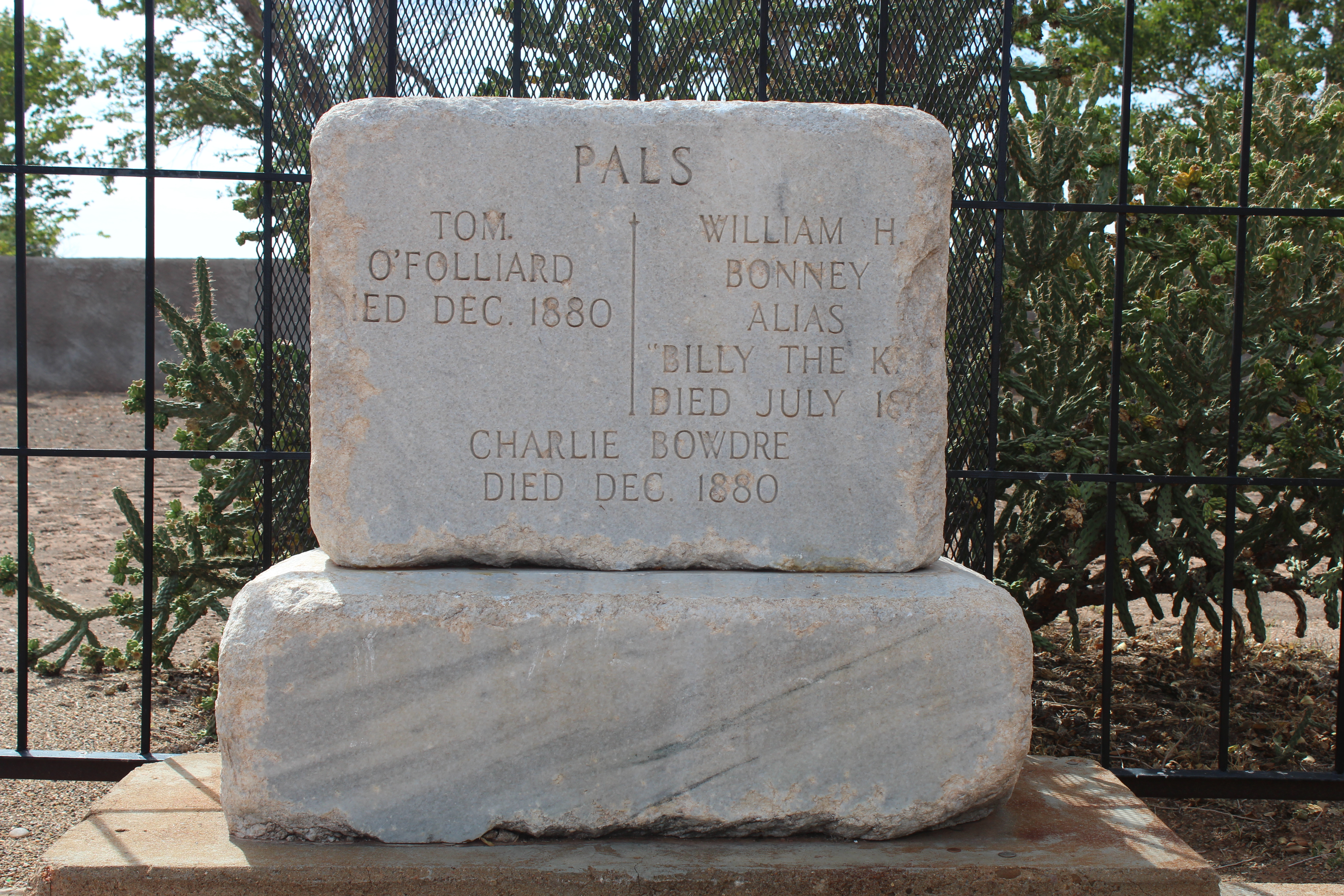
Billy the Kid's headstone in Fort Sumner, New Mexico

In 2003, as detailed by the forensic anthropologists Komar and Buikstra, the governor of New Mexico, Bill Richardson, told the press that he supported reopening the investigation into the death of Billy the Kid to determine whether the outlaw was actually buried in the New Mexico gravesite that had become a popular tourist attraction. The group leading the investigation was composed of a New Mexico history professor, a county attorney, local sheriffs, and the mayor of the town of Capitan.

They announced that the case was a criminal investigation, and stated that it was intended to: "determine whether or not Pat Garret had shot William Bonney (a.ka. known as Billy the Kid) in Fort Sumner on July 14, 1881", to exhume the remains in the putative grave for DNA testing, and to exhume the remains of Catherine Antrim, William Bonney's mother. Per Komar and Buikstra: "The investigators also indicated their intent to test Antrim's DNA against that of "Brushy" Bill Roberts, who had claimed to be Billy the Kid." No forensic scientists were included in the group, contrary to their stated goal in the press release: "to put modern forensic science to the test to answer the questions surrounding those days in New Mexico history." The state medical examiner's office refused to issue a permit for any exhumation. The exhumation of both sets of remains was blocked in court in September 2004.

== In popular culture ==
Brushy Bill's quest to prove that he was the real Billy the Kid is dramatized in the 1990 film Young Guns II, where Billy the Kid and an elderly Brushy Bill are both portrayed by the film's star Emilio Estevez.

Billy the Kid in Hico
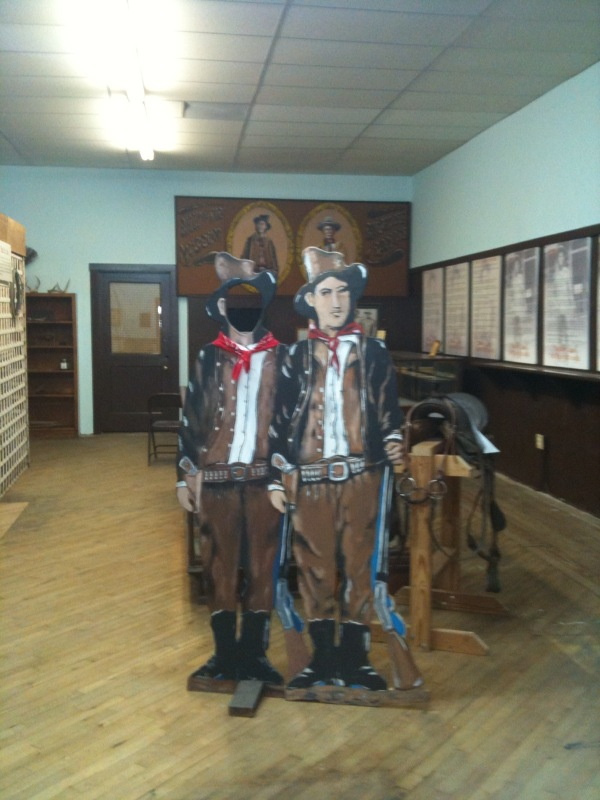
Photo-op mockup of Billy the Kid in the Chamber of Commerce, Hico, Texas, April 1, 2010

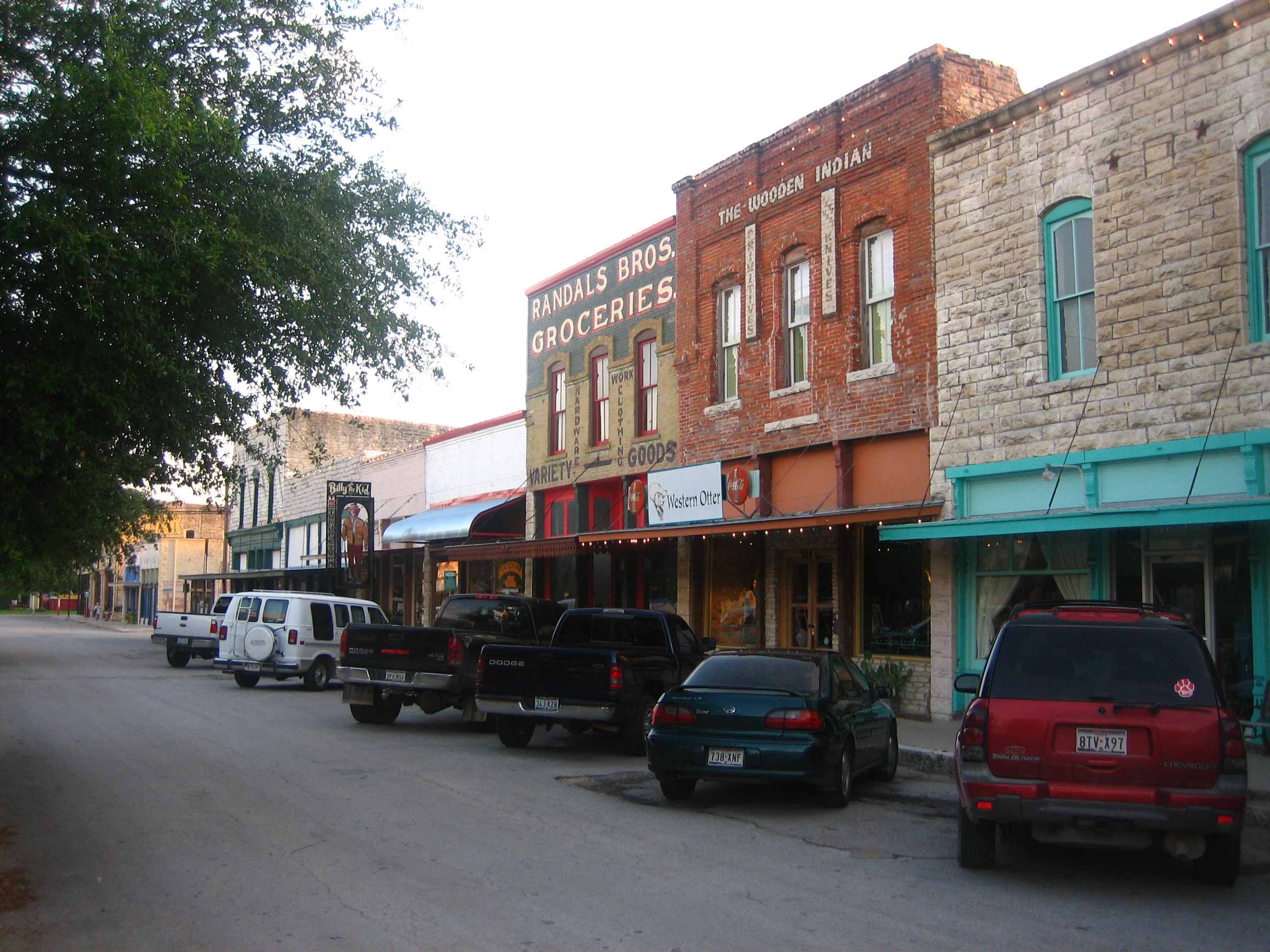
Historic district in Hico with Billy the Kid Museum

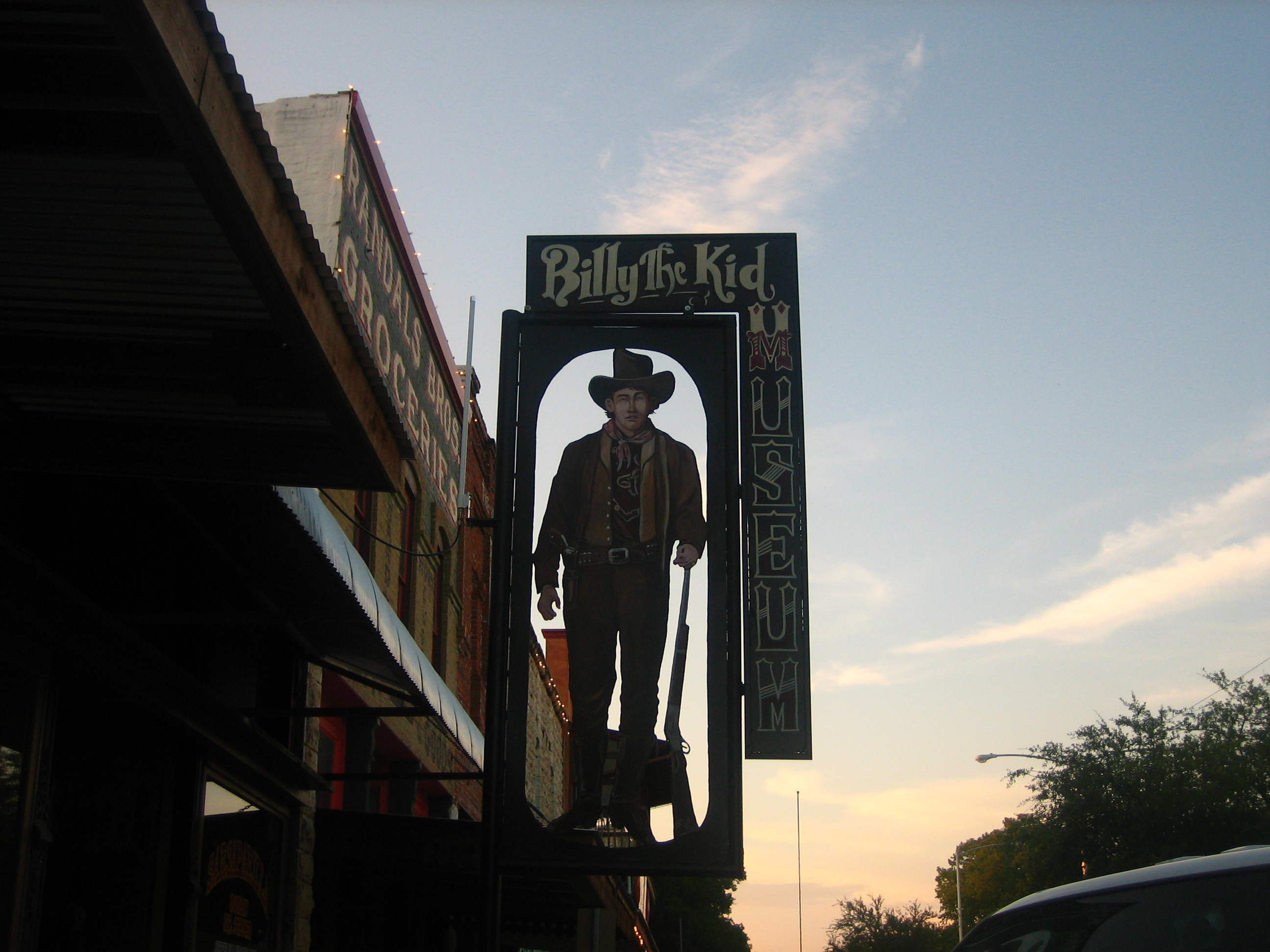
Billy the Kid Museum

== See also ==
- Folklore of the United States
- The Authentic Life of Billy, the Kid
- List of Old West gunfighters
- List of Old West lawmen
