= Robert Banner (socialist) =

Robert Banner (27 November 1855 – 7 November 1910) was a Scottish socialist politician and trade unionist.

Born in Edinburgh, Banner undertook an apprenticeship as a bookbinder. He was a founding member of the Edinburgh Republican Club in 1871, and became its secretary in 1874. Through it, he struck up a friendship with Andreas Scheu, who influenced his future politics.

In 1877, on completing his apprenticeship, Banner joined the Bookbinders' and Machine Rulers' Consolidated Union, which he represented as a delegate to Edinburgh Trades Council. He unsuccessfully argued that the council should focus on campaigning for a nine-hour maximum working day, and that it should not endorse Liberal Party candidates. He soon became a supporter of Karl Marx and Friedrich Engels. He asked Marx to translate Das Kapital into English, while Marx asked him to update him on developments in the Scottish labour movement.

In 1881, Banner called a conference of social democrats in Hamilton, trying to use his connections with Keir Hardie in a failed attempt to found a Scottish Labour Party. Instead, he joined the Democratic Federation winning election to its executive in 1882. He also co-operated with the Irish Land League, later implying that he had been involved with the Phoenix Park Murders.

Later in 1882, Banner moved to Woolwich, where he joined the Invicta Working Men's Club. He also remained active in the Democratic Federation, launching meetings every Sunday in Regents Park, and also speaking outside Woolwich Arsenal. In 1884, he launched a Woolwich branch of the federation, and was re-elected to its national executive. He was part of the split which formed the Socialist League, leading the whole Woolwich branch into the new organisation. Banner himself served on the league's executive, and was proposed as its secretary, without his support or knowledge. He opposed the growth of anarchism in the league, and this led him to resign from it in 1886. However, he remained in close contact with it, and in particular, with Alexander K. Donald and John Lincoln Mahon of its Bloomsbury group. In 1888, they began forming the Labour Union, and Banner took an active role until late 1889, when he became convinced that the group would not prove a success.

Banner continued speaking in support of socialism, calling for an eight-hour working day and the formation of the Woolwich Labour Party. He also supported the National Union of Gas Workers and General Labourers, through which activity he became reacquainted with Keir Hardie. He served as Hardie's election agent in his successful campaign in West Ham South at the 1892 UK general election. That year, he also won election to the Fabian Society's executive, but resigned soon after as his working hours meant he was unable to attend its meetings.

Banner led the tiny Woolwich Labour Party into the new Independent Labour Party (ILP). He won election to the Woolwich Local Board of Health, and championed numerous improvements, many of which were achieved, but he lost his seat in 1899. This position also gave him a seat on the board of Woolwich Polytechnic; he led a campaign which saved it from closure, and Sidney Webb ensured that he was able to keep this position for the remainder of his life. In 1899, he became secretary of the Woolwich Progressive Association, which aimed to bring together labour and liberal supporters at elections, but this was dissolved in 1903, as the new Labour Representation Committee had become overwhelmingly strong in the borough. In 1903, Banner won election to Woolwich Metropolitan Borough Council, and was given a seat on its library committee. He lost his seat in 1906.

Banner spoke at Eleanor Marx's funeral. He continued his trade union activity, standing unsuccessfully to become its assistant secretary in 1908. He helped negotiate with other unions in the industry, but he died in September 1910, shortly before the formation of the new National Union of Bookbinders and Machine Rulers.
