= William Morison =

William Morison may refer to:

- William Morison (1663–1739), MP for Haddingtonshire and Peeblesshire
- Sir William Morison (1781–1851), MP for Clackmannanshire and Kinross-shire
- William Morison (minister) (1843–1937), Scottish clergyman and advocate

== See also ==
- William Morrison (disambiguation)
