= Francis Herbert Stead =

English social reformer (1857–1928)

Francis Herbert Stead (1857 – 14 January 1928), commonly cited as F. H. Stead, was an English social reformer notable for the establishment of Browning Hall in London, 1895, and for his work on the National Committee of Organised Labour which waged a decade-long campaign for the introduction of a general tax-funded system of old-age pensions from 1899.

== Biography ==
Francis Herbert Stead was born in 1857 in Howdon, near Wallsend, North Tyneside, in the north-east of England, the son of a Congregational minister, the Rev William Stead, and Isabella (née Jobson), a cultivated daughter of a Yorkshire farmer. For a time Francis followed in the footsteps of his older brother William Thomas Stead, a campaigning journalist. Later he took a Master of Arts in theology at the University of Glasgow in 1881 and trained there for the ministry. He thereafter studied in Germany and travelled in Europe.

He was the Minister of Gallowtree Gate Congregational Church, Leicester, from 1884 to 1890, during which period he married Bessie MacGregor, a school teacher. They had two daughters and two sons. Stead moved to London to assume the editorship of the Independent and Nonconformist from 1890 to 1892 and was involved in the settlement movement, which aimed to encourage relatively wealthy, educated and socially advantaged people to live in proximity with the working poor. Perhaps influenced by the model of Toynbee Hall and the work of Samuel and Henrietta Barnett, in 1894–95 he founded Browning Hall in 1894–95 at 62 Camberwell Road, Walworth. The Robert Browning Settlement provided accommodation for some university educated residents and a relatively large number of autodidacts such as James Keir Hardie.

Browning Hall formed a centre for practical experimentation in social change, with a more political emphasis than other contemporary settlements, and became a local centre for trade union activities. Stead's interest in the problems of old-age led to a Browning Hall conference on pensions in December 1898, out of which arose the National Committee of Organised Labour (NECL), which worked to encourage the introduction of old-age pensions funded from general taxation – a campaign won with the passing of the Old Age Pensions Act 1908. Stead worked with Frederick Rogers for a decade, writing pamphlets and books, lobbying parliament and religious leaders, and travelling the length of the country to speak for the cause.

Stead died at Blackheath on 14 January 1928.
