= Original Society of Papermakers =

The Original Society of Papermakers was an early trade union in the United Kingdom.

== History ==
The union is generally held to have been founded in 1800, although minutes of a meeting held in 1799 survive. Some accounts mention a preceding guild which had ceased to function. It represented journeymen, and was particularly strong in Kent; by 1825 it was said to have about 1,000 members in the county, and 2,000 elsewhere. It led successful strikes against wage reductions in 1804 and 1812. While its existence was well-known, trade unions were illegal, and the secretary would often bury the books and other documents, to prevent their seizure. In 1815, a meeting of the society at St Paul's Cray was raided, the secretary escaping through the window and travelling to Maidstone, where the headquarters remained thereafter.

The union represented hand paper makers, although it did not support machine breaking, and did admit a few members who worked on machines. In 1830, it split over a dispute about pay for producing ledger paper, with the two factions being known as The Star and The Deckle. They reunited in 1837, but the 1840s proved a difficult decade, with strikes over reductions leading to one mill being burned down, the Scottish and Irish papermakers leaving the union, and the introduction of a scheme to assist members to emigrate. In 1854, the rival United Brotherhood of Paper Makers was founded, to represent machine paper makers, and the Original Society fell into a long decline. By 1947, the union had only 47 members, and the following year, it merged into the National Union of Printing, Bookbinding and Paper Workers.

== Secretaries ==
1800: W. Bell
James Burne
George Peters
Daniel Gardiner
Robert Rankin
1830: John Rankin and William Grigsby
1837: John Rankin
William Baker
Joseph Sharp
Fred Melluish
Richard Allen
Robert Peters
John Potter
George Wright
W. Bune
James Bourne
Robert Robertson
Arthur Smith
J. J. Highsted
