= Arthur Colefax =

British patent lawyer and Liberal Unionist politician

Sir Henry Arthur Colefax, KBE, KC (9 July 1866 – 19 February 1936) was a British patent lawyer and Liberal Unionist politician.

== Biography ==
Colefax was born in Bradford, Yorkshire, and was the son of J S Colefax, a woollen merchant. He was initially educated at Bradford Grammar School before studying natural science and chemistry at the University of Strasbourg, and at Merton and Christ Church Colleges at the University of Oxford.

In 1894 he was called to the bar at Lincoln's Inn, and quickly became an acknowledged expert on patent law. He was made a King's Counsel in 1912.

At the January 1910 general election he was elected as Liberal Unionist Member of Parliament (MP) for Manchester South West, benefiting from a split in anti-Unionist vote between the Social Democratic Federation and Liberal candidates. He held the seat for less than a year, and was defeated at ensuing election in December.

Much of his work was involved in Anglo-German patents, but this was ended by outbreak of the First World War. He became head of the scientific department of the Ministry of Munitions for the duration of the war. He was knighted for his wartime services in 1920.

In 1918 he was appointed as solicitor-general of the County Palatine of Durham, becoming Chancellor of the Chancery Court of the Palatine in 1930. These offices had been almost entirely ceremonial since 1837.

In 1901 he married Sibyl Halsey, and they had two sons. Sibyl Colefax was to become a renowned interior designer.

Colefax died from pneumonia at his Chelsea home in 1936, aged 69.

Parliament of the United Kingdom
Preceded by George Davy Kelley	Member of Parliament for Manchester South West; January 1910 – December 1910	Succeeded by Christopher Thomas Needham
