= Amalgamated Society of Paper Makers =

The Amalgamated Society of Paper Makers (ASPM) was a trade union in the United Kingdom.

The union was founded in 1854 as the United Brotherhood of Paper Makers. Many of its founding members split away from the Original Society of Papermakers, which focused on representing workers who did not use machinery. The new union represented beatermen, machinemen, and finishers, who were seen as the more skilled machine workers in the industry.

The system of tramping for work was rare in the industry in the 1850s, but re-emerged in the 1860s. A group within the union opposed this, and in 1869 they split away, forming the Modern Society of Paper Makers. In 1894, the Modern Society rejoined the United Brotherhood, which renamed itself as the "Amalgamated Society of Paper Makers". By World War I, it had begun working closely with the National Union of Printing and Paper Workers, and on 1 January 1937 it merged into its successor, the National Union of Printing, Bookbinding and Paper Workers.

== Secretaries ==
1894: Charles Howard
1899: William Dyson
1920: Arthur Fowler
