= William Johnson Galloway =

British politician

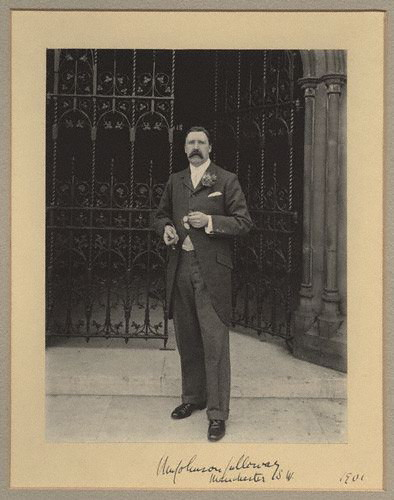
William Johnson Galloway

William Johnson Galloway (5 October 1868 – 28 January 1931) was a British businessman and Conservative politician.

Galloway was born on 5 October 1868 in Sale, Cheshire, and was the only son of John Galloway, JP. He was educated at Wellington College and Trinity Hall, Cambridge. He made his home at Old Trafford, near Manchester, and became a partner in W & J Galloway & Sons, engineers and boiler makers, in the city.

He was active in the Conservative Party in Manchester, and at the 1892 general election stood unsuccessfully for the party in the South-Eastern or Rugby Division of Warwickshire. In 1895 he was elected as Member of Parliament for Manchester South West. He held the seat until the 1906 general election, when he was defeated by a Labour Party opponent.

Galloway was a Lieutenant in the Duke of Lancaster's Own Yeomanry, later becoming Honorary Colonel of the East Lancashire Royal Engineers, a Volunteer unit (later part of the Territorial Force). During the First World War he was on the staff of the Quartermaster General and also held positions with the Ministry of Information and the Foreign Office.

In 1903, he was elected a director of the Great Eastern Railway Company, becoming chairman of the Locomotive Committee. When the GER was merged into the London and North Eastern Railway, Galloway became a director and was chairman of the Steamships and Continental Committee, a position he held until his death on 28 January 1931, aged 62.

Aside from his Manchester address, Galloway also maintained houses in London and at Skaife (or Scaife) Hall, Otley, Yorkshire. He was also a director of the Blackpool Lane Company and of the Carnforth Hematite Iron Company.

He was elected a Member of the Worshipful Company of Musicians in January 1903.

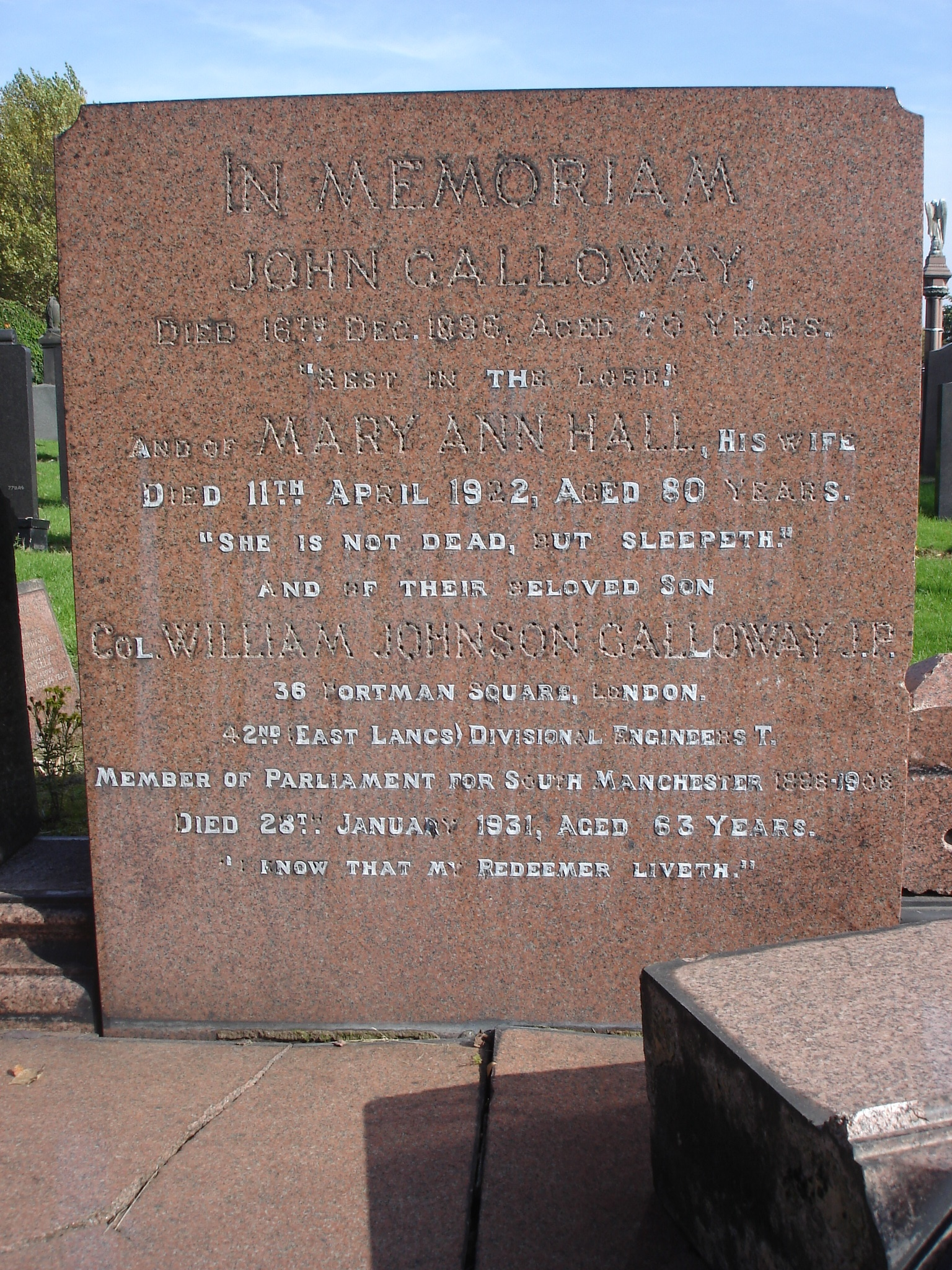
Galloway grave, Weaste cemetery

On his death he was buried in the Galloway family grave at Weaste Cemetery.

== Publications ==
Galloway published at least three books:

- Musical England
- Operatic Problem
- Advanced Australia

Parliament of the United Kingdom
| Preceded by Jacob Bright | Member of Parliament for Manchester South West; 1895–1906 | Succeeded by George Davy Kelley |
