= Christopher Needham =

British politician (1866–1944)

Christopher Needham

Sir Christopher Thomas Needham (30 August 1866 – 29 April 1944) was a British businessman and Liberal politician.

Needham was educated at Manchester Grammar School and the University of Manchester. He was to maintain a link with the university throughout his life, becoming a governor in 1908, a chairman of the council from 1936 to 1941. He became a partner in the family company, John Needham and Sons of Manchester, iron and steel merchants.

He stood as Liberal candidate for the constituency of Manchester South West at the January 1910 general election, but was defeated by the Conservative, Arthur Colefax. The position was reversed at the ensuing election in December, when Needham unseated Colefax to become a Member of Parliament. He held the seat until 1918.

General election 1918: Manchester Hulme
Party	Candidate	Votes	%	±%
Unionist	Joseph Nall	10,895	54.0	n/a
Liberal	Christopher Needham	5,969	29.6	n/a
Independent Labour	Alfred Hilton (Note: Nominee of the United Carters' and Motormen's Association)	2,572	12.8	n/a
Independent	George Milner (Note: Supported by and possibly the nominee of the National Federation of Discharged and Demobilized Sailors and Soldiers)	729	3.6	n/a
Majority		4,926	24.4	n/a
Turnout		20,165	52.9	n/a
Unionist win (new seat)				

After leaving parliament, Needham was knighted in 1919, and expanded his business interests. He became chairman of the Manchester and Liverpool District Banking Company in 1922. He remained chairman of the company (renamed the District Bank) until 1936. He was chairman of the National Boiler and General Insurance Company and was also a director of the London and North Eastern Railway, the Manchester Ship Canal and the Alliance Assurance company. Outside of business, he was chairman of Lancashire County Cricket Club from 1941 to 1943. Sir Christopher was elected to membership of the Manchester Literary and Philosophical Society in 1942.

He married Florence White in 1902, and they had one daughter before her death in 1905. Sir Christopher Needham died at his home in West Didsbury in 1944, aged 77.

== Notes ==
Parliament of the United Kingdom
Preceded by Arthur Colefax	Member of Parliament for Manchester South West; December 1910–1918	Constituency abolished
Professional and academic associations
Preceded by Very Rev. Mgr Dr Anselm Pocock	President of the Manchester Statistical Society; 1919–21	Succeeded by Frank Roby
