= Tom Smith (trade unionist) =

British trade union leader

Thomas James Smith (20 November 1905 – 3 August 1970) was a British trade union leader.

Smith was educated at the Shoreditch Technical Institute. He worked as a printer for various newspapers in London, and joined the National Union of Printing, Bookbinding and Paper Workers. He became the full-time secretary of the union's London Central branch in 1951. Ten years later, he was elected as general secretary of the union, narrowly beating John McKenzie and Vincent Flynn. He was also appointed as a member of the economic development committees for Printing, and for Paper and Board.

Smith led the union into a merger with the National Society of Operative Printers and Assistants (NATSOPA), forming the Society of Graphical and Allied Trades (SOGAT) in 1966. He became joint general secretary of the new union, but the merger soon collapsed, and with NATSOPA leaving, and Smith became sole general secretary of the union.

In December 1968, Smith suffered a heart attack. He received medical advice to rest, but returned to work, anticipating his retirement in November 1970. However, he suffered a further heart attack and died in his office in August of that year.

Trade union offices
Preceded by Bill Morrison	General Secretary of the National Union of Printing, Bookbinding and Paper Workers; 1961–1966	Succeeded by Position abolished
Preceded by New position	General Secretary of the Society of Graphical and Allied Trades; 1966–1970; With: Richard Briginshaw (1966)	Succeeded by Vincent Flynn
