= Thomas Dunning =

English bookbinder and trade unionist

- Born: 12 January 1799; Southwark, England
- Died: 23 December 1873 (aged 74)
- Occupations: Bookbinder, trade unionist

Thomas Joseph Dunning (12 January 1799 – 23 December 1873) was an English bookbinder and trade unionist.

== Biography ==
He was born on 12 January 1799 in Southwark, the son of Joseph Hill Dunning, a waterworks turncock, and Ann Barber Dunning. He was apprenticed to a bookbinder in 1813. In 1820, he joined the Journeymen Bookbinders of London and was elected to its chairing committee in the late 1830s. In the strike of 1839 he favoured a view, in contrast to the majority, that a deal should be struck with the employers. He resigned from the committee but was part of negotiations of the final settlement. In 1840, he took part in reorganization of the existing in London bookbinders' trade union groups which resulted in defection of the London Consolidated Society of Journeymen Bookbinders from the national union. Dunning stayed at the helm of the London Consolidated Society until 1871 when he resigned for health reasons. He continued to edit the Bookbinder's Trade Circular that he founded until his death in 1873.

Dunning married twice, first, on 28 June 1824 taking Susannah Hooper as his wife; and then, after becoming a widower, on 8 September 1840 he married Susannah Heath.

== Political and economic views ==
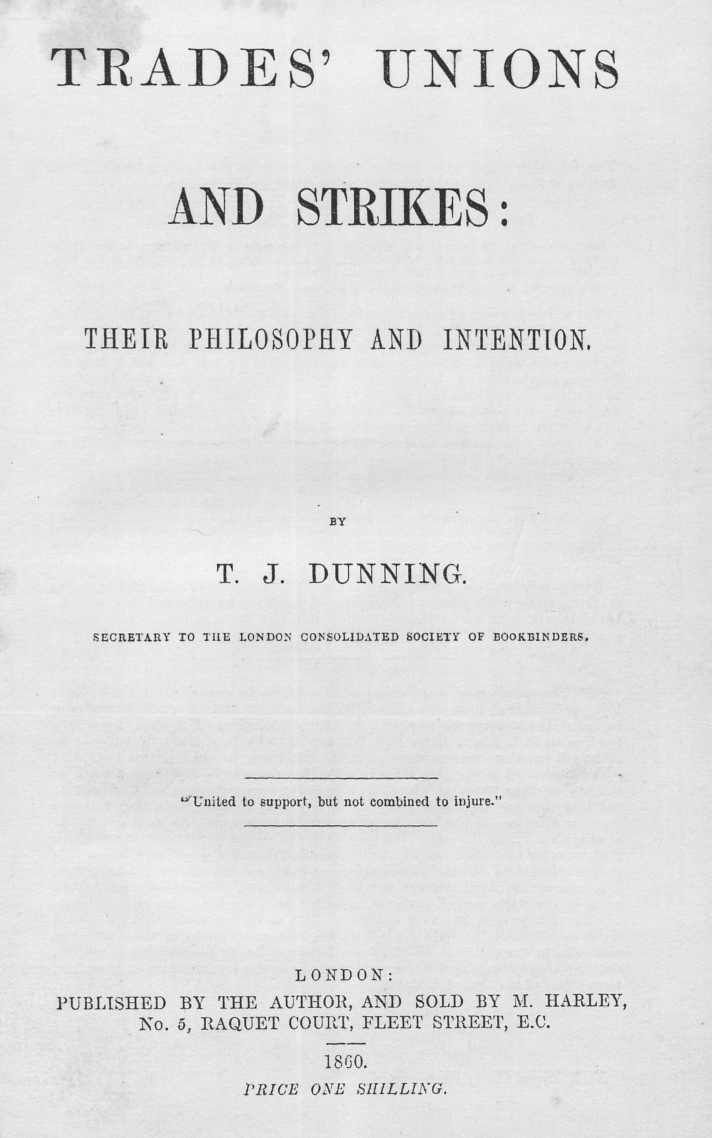
Title page of Trades' unions and strikes (1860)

Dunning was involved with the Chartist movement in 1840s and collaborated with William Lovett. He continued to support political franchise after the defeat of Chartism becoming a staunch Liberal. However, as a trade union leader he advised to avoid entanglement in disputes and schemes of major party politics and negatively viewed participation in potentially dividing political campaigns especially when they involved international issues. For example, Dunning advocated non-involvement during the 1863 Polish rebellion crisis and supported the independence of the South in the American Civil War; like some other ex-Chartists, i.e., John Bedford Leno and Patrick Matthew, he distrusted centralization of the federal government in America and compared Abraham Lincoln to Xerxes.

Dunning viewed laws regulating relations between employers and employees, such as Master and Servant Acts, as putting industrial labour under "the old feudal notion of serfdom". In his writing, he called for industrial harmony but also justified the right of British workingmen, both urban and rural, to strike and unionize in order to raise the price of labour during the ongoing mid-Victorian economic upswing. On the request of the members of his trade union, he wrote and published a pamphlet on the philosophy of trade unionism, Trades' unions and strikes: their philosophy and intention (1860). He argued that employer and employed workmen were not standing on equal footing during bargaining process and encouraged workers to combine into unions to increase their bargaining powers. However, he cautioned against falling into radicalism and anarchy and emphasized that capital and labour "are each, notwithstanding these occasional disagreements, the truest friends of the other, and neither can inflict an injury on the other without its recoiling on himself. Capital and Labour should go hand in hand. Experience has amply proved that the Capitalist cannot injure the Labourer, or the Labourer the Capitalist, without each inflicting injury, and perhaps ruin, upon themselves."

He argued that rural trade unionism was not a revolutionary threat: "...the landowners and farmers ought to rejoice that it has taken place, for it is of all others a circumstance which if successful, will give stability to their position and render impossible to them similar fate to that of the French nobility and farmers who were swept from the face of the earth for the same kind of oppression. To avert such a catastrophe, success must attend the movement of the agricultural labourers." He criticised land nationalisation as not only economically inefficient but politically dangerous as it would create a government monopoly. The solution was to liberalise the market through the abolition of primogeniture and the laws of settlement and entail.

== Recognition ==
Liberal political economist John Stuart Mill commended Dunning for writing an "able tract" containing "many sound arguments." Socialist economists Sydney and Beatrice Webb characterized Dunning as "one of the ablest Trade Unionists of his time." In his turn, Karl Marx thought highly of Dunning and quoted him several times.

Famous quote in Marx's Capital from Dunning's pamphlet, Trades' unions and strikes runs as:

Capital is said by a Quarterly Reviewer to fly turbulence and strife, and to be timid, which is very true; but this is very incompletely stating the question. Capital eschews no profit, or very small profit, just as Nature was formerly said to abhor a vacuum. With adequate profit, capital is very bold. A certain 10 per cent. will ensure its employment anywhere; 20 per cent. certain will produce eagerness; 50 per cent., positive audacity; 100 per cent. will make it ready to trample on all human laws; 300 per cent., and there is not a crime at which it will scruple, nor a risk it will not run, even to the chance of its owner being hanged. If turbulence and strife will bring a profit, it will freely encourage both. Smuggling and the slave-trade have amply proved all that is here stated.

British labour historian Royden Harrison called Dunning, "the authoritative voice of the Trades Union oligarchy". Another British historian Lawrence Goldman summarised Dunning's legacy as follows: "Dunning and his contemporaries had harnessed the organized working class to the Liberal Party, to liberal political economy, and to the liberal values of equality before the law."

== Later life ==
Dunning remained secretary of the London Consolidated Lodge for thirty-one years. In June 1871, he was knocked over by a vehicle, hospitalised with a severe concussion, and partially paralysed. He resigned as secretary, but was granted a pension by the union, and continued to edit the union's newsletter, the Circular, until 1873. He is buried in Abney Park Cemetery, Stoke Newington.

== Works ==
- Trades' unions and strikes: their philosophy and intention (1860)
- The advantages and disadvantages of trade combinations (1864)

== Notes ==
Trade union offices
Preceded by New position	General Secretary of the London Consolidated Lodge of Journeymen Bookbinders; 1840–1871	Succeeded by H. R. King
