= William V. Morrison =

William Vincent Morrison
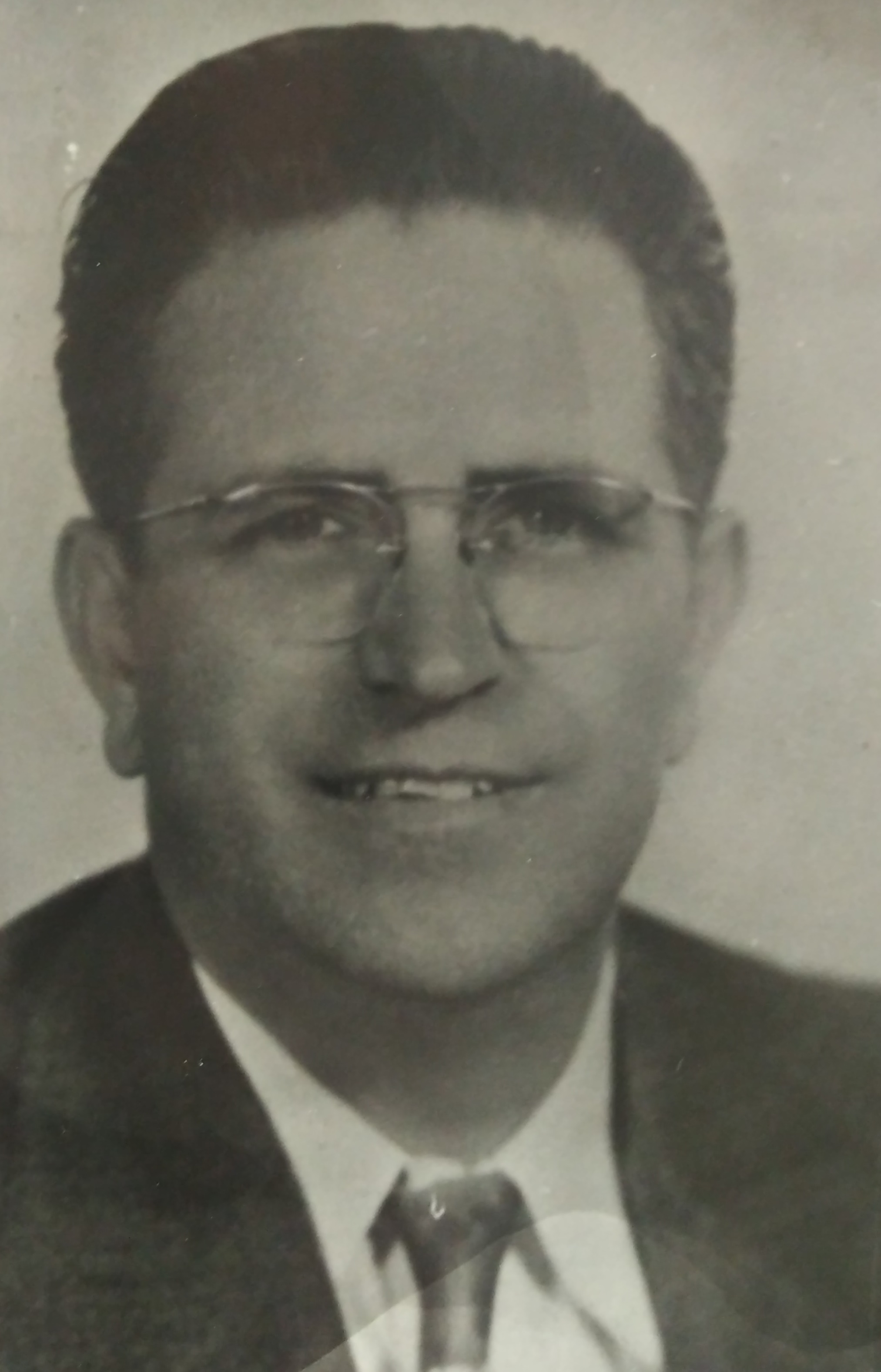
- William V. Morrison Author Photo
- Born: November 26, 1906; Illinois, U.S.
- Died: August 30, 1977 (aged 70); El Paso, Texas, U.S.
- Education: LaSalle Extension University
- Occupations: Probate investigator, author

William Vincent Morrison (1906-1977) was an American paralegal, probate investigator, and genealogical researcher best known for his efforts in seeking a pardon for William H. "Brushy Bill" Roberts in 1950, a man who in the 1940s appeared claiming to be Billy the Kid.

== Early life and career ==
Morrison was born in Illinois and was a descendant of Lucien Bonaparte Maxwell. Following high school, he became the manager of a grocery store in St Louis, Missouri in 1930 and continued taking correspondence courses at LaSalle Extension University, graduating in 1940. By the 1940s, Morrison had become a court appointed probate investigator, specializing in wills and bankruptcies, often working with various law firms in St. Louis, Missouri, and in Texas.

== Genealogical studies and research on the Maxwell Land Grant ==
Morrison was a member of the Missouri Historical Society and conducted extensive primary research on the Maxwell Land Grant. Many of Morrison's papers have been donated to the Abraham Lincoln Presidential Library in Springfield, Illinois.

== Joe Hines and Billy the Kid ==
In 1949, Morrison was appointed to settle a court case involving a man named Joe Hines, whose brother had died in Minot, North Dakota. During the course of proving his identity to the court, Hines claimed that he was in fact the notorious outlaw Jesse Evans that had fought in the Lincoln County War and related that Billy the Kid was not killed by Pat Garrett in 1881. Morrison was intrigued, but skeptical. Hines would not reveal the name or whereabouts of The Kid, but did provide some leads that Morrison was able to follow which eventually led him to William H. "Brushy Bill" Roberts in Hico, Texas. Following a period of interviews and approximately one year of gathering evidence, Morrison became convinced that Roberts was The Kid and took the 90-year-old Roberts in front of New Mexico Governor Thomas Mabry to obtain a pardon. Mabry was unimpressed, and allowed numerous skeptics to attend the meeting, who peppered Roberts with questions. Roberts had a stroke on the spot, and died slightly more than a month later. Disappointed with the results, and believing that Roberts had not received a fair hearing, Morrison collaborated with renowned folklorist C. L. Sonnichsen on a book entitled Alias Billy the Kid published in 1955.
