= Browning Hall =

Social settlement house in inner London

Coordinates: 51.48241°N 0.09495°W

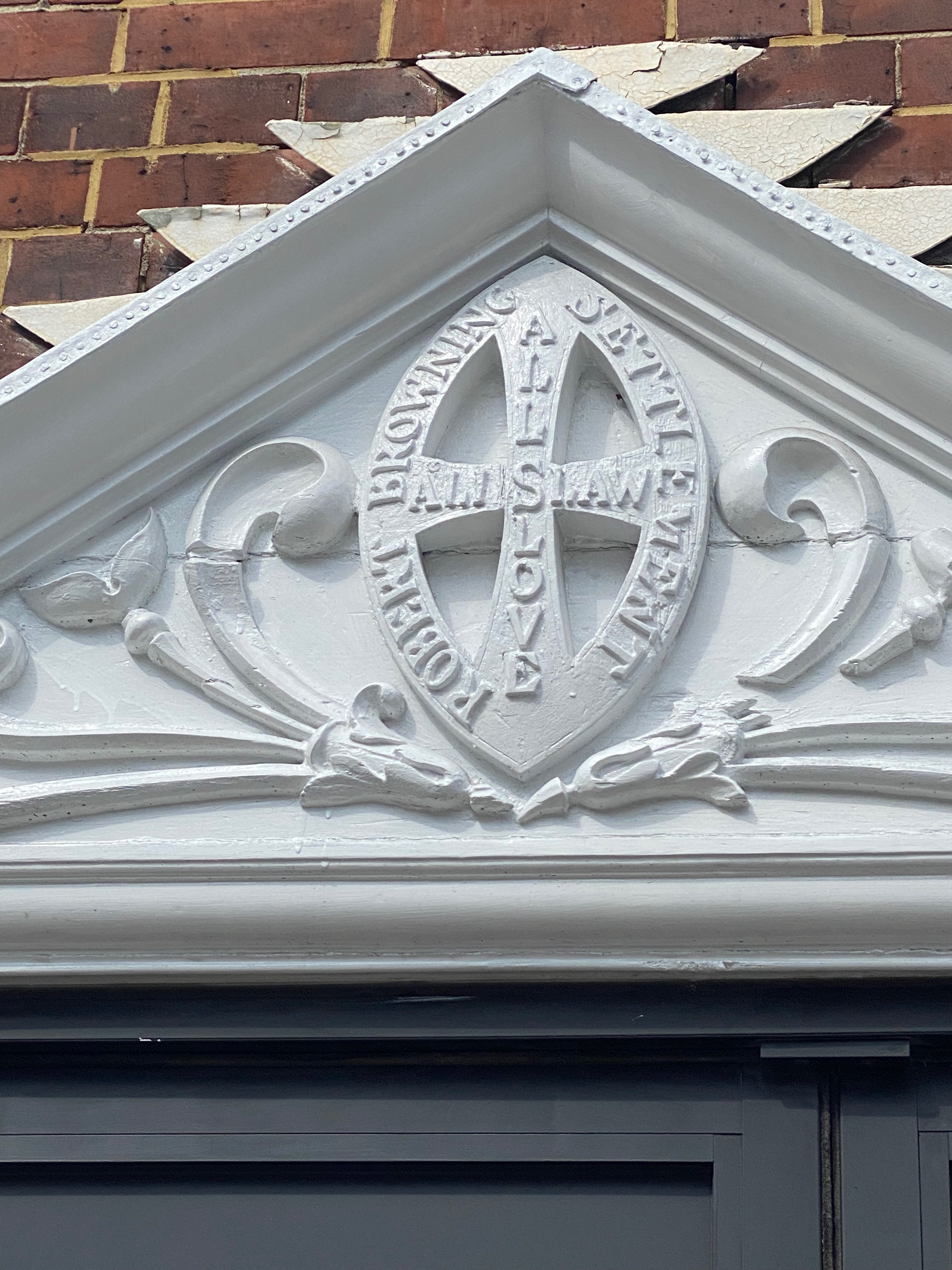
Plaque above the door to Herbert Morrison House, 195 Walworth Road

Browning Hall, properly The Robert Browning Settlement, was a social settlement established in Walworth, London, in 1895, one of a number of such 'settlements' arising out of the settlement movement and the university extension movement. It provided a range of social services to the poor of its deprived area, and provided accommodation enabling relatively well-educated people to live amongst the people with whom they worked.

== Origins ==
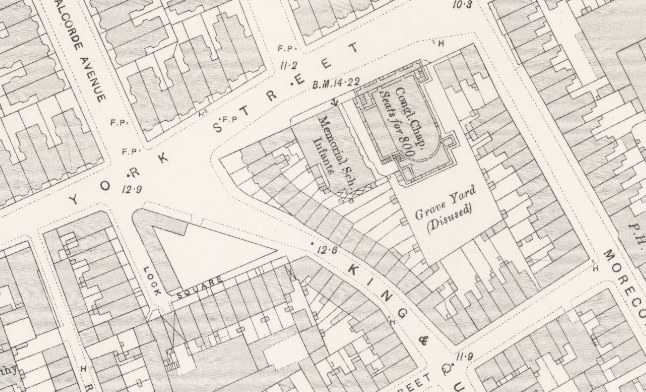
York Street chapel shown on the 1895 Ordnance Survey map

The settlement movement was a reformist social movement, beginning in the 1880s and peaking around the 1920s, with a goal of getting the rich and poor in society to live more closely together in an interdependent community. Its main object was the establishment of "settlement houses" in poor urban areas, in which volunteer middle-class "settlement workers" would live, hoping to share knowledge and culture with, and alleviate the poverty of, their low-income neighbors. The university extension movement was similarly disposed, to bring high quality education to the urban poor by means of the establishment of university settlement houses. An early and prominent example was offered by the formation of Toynbee Hall by Samuel and Henrietta Barnett

The Browning Hall settlement was formed by Francis Herbert Stead, a congregationalist minister who served at the York Street Chapel in Walworth. The chapel was in 1890 renamed "Browning Hall", honouring Robert Browning, who had been baptised there in 1812. The settlement was established along the lines of Toynbee Hall. Initially closely associated with the chapel, the settlement was inaugurated in November, 1895 with an address given by H. H. Asquith. In 1902, it established itself in separate premises at 62 Camberwell Road.

== Operation ==
The settlement provided accommodation for a number of university-educated volunteers, but also a relatively large proportion of self-taught volunteers, including James Keir Hardie. Browning Hall offered a wide range of services over time, including adult education (including acting as the Walworth centre for the London University Extension Society), social-work training, a savings club, legal aid, organised country holidays, summer camps, and a range of clubs and societies.

By design, the settlement had an interest in Labour politics. Its entry in the Directory of Settlements stated: "We stand for the Labour Movement in religion. We stand for the endeavour to obtain for Labour not merely more of the good things of life, but most of the best things in life. Come and join us in the service of Him who is the Lord of Labour and the soul of all social reform". It became a hub for trade union activity, most notably giving rise to the 1899–1908 National Committee of Organised Labour, which successfully campaigned for the introduction of general tax funded old-age pensions; and later becoming involved in a further successful campaign for the provision of old-people's homes.

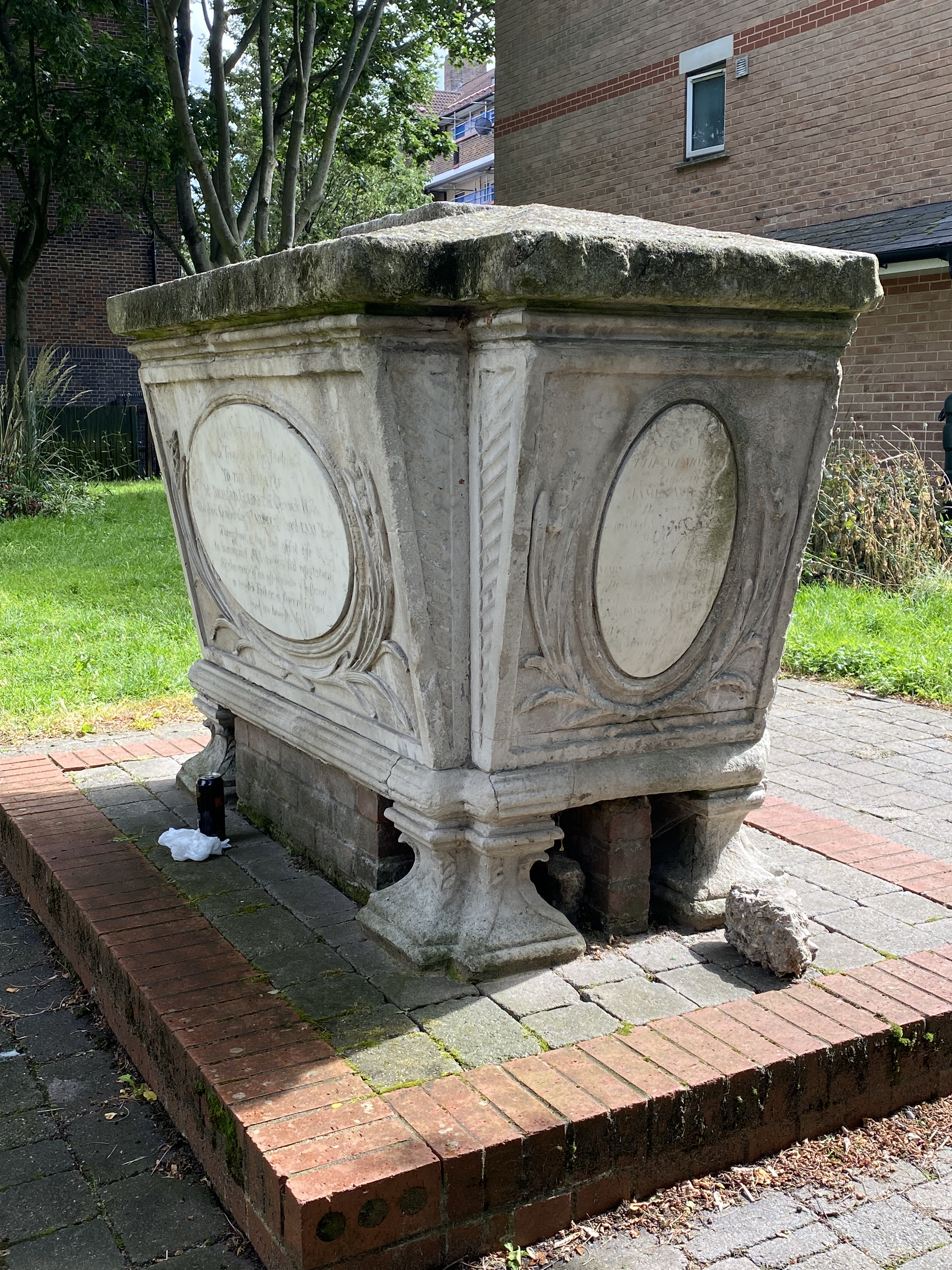
Tomb in Browning Settlement Garden, near former site of York Road Chapel
