= Bookbinders' and Machine Rulers' Consolidated Union =

Former trade union of the United Kingdom

- Merged into: National Union of Bookbinders and Machine Rulers
- Founded: 19 October 1835
- Dissolved: 1 January 1911
- Location: United Kingdom
- Members: 4,657 (1911)
- Publication: Circular
- Affiliations: TUC, P&KTF, Labour

The Bookbinders and Machine Rulers' Consolidated Union (B&MRCU) was a trade union representing people involved in the manufacturing of books in the United Kingdom.

The union was founded on 19 October 1835 in Manchester as the Bookbinders' Consolidated Relief Fund, with the principal aim of funding journeymen bookbinders to travel to other cities to find work, although it did also hope to improve the working conditions of bookbinders. It brought together local organisations around the UK, but it did not include the larger unions based in London and Edinburgh. Individuals could also join the union, but had to pay one guinea as an entrance fee.

In June 1836, the first chief secretary of the union, James Winkworth, claimed to have lost money provided to him to pay a printers' bill. The union's central committee believed that he had embezzled the money, and removed him from office. Four years later, Thomas Dunning persuaded the union to reorganise as the Bookbinders' Consolidated Union, a more centralised body, while he merged the various London unions to form the London Consolidated Lodge of Journeymen Bookbinders. The plan was for the London union to merge into the national union, and take over its leadership, but it was found to be in a weak financial position, and the national union decided to remain separate. The national union itself began struggling, and nearly collapsed in 1842, leading the headquarters of the union to move to the stronger branch in Dublin the following year.

Henry Searson became the chief secretary of the union in 1843, but after his wife died, he struggled to keep up with the work, and in 1847 a vote moved the headquarters of the union again, on this occasion to Liverpool. The union had grown significantly to 39 branches, and in 1854 an unemployment benefit for members was introduced. By 1855, the Liverpool branch was itself suffering from internal disputes, and the headquarters of the union were moved to Oxford. The union opened its first branch in London in 1857, directly competing with the London Consolidated Lodge. The headquarters moved to Manchester in 1858, by which time finances were again weak, as the unemployment benefit had been unexpectedly costly.

In 1872, the union was renamed as the Bookbinders' and Machine Rulers' Consolidated Union, recognising a significant section of its membership. On 1 September, the Edinburgh Union Society of Journeymen Bookbinders, which had been involved in an unsuccessful strike, finally merged into the union. The rest of the decade was a difficult period, and in 1881 it was discovered that during it, secretary Richard Ballard had embezzled £202. He was able to avoid prosecution by refunding the money, but in light of this, the union headquarters were once again moved to Liverpool, and a new rule was introduced that no city could host the seat of the union for more than six years in a row. This led it to move to Glasgow in 1888, at which time it was found that the previous secretary, Daniel Hughes, had embezzled £211. In 1894, the headquarters moved to Bradford, which persuaded members to appoint a full-time chief secretary, this post going to the previous part-time holder, David Sharpe, who accordingly relocated to Bradford. The union affiliated to the Printing and Kindred Trades Federation, and in 1899 its headquarters returned to Manchester, then in 1905 to Sheffield.

The union established a general council for the first time in 1900, and this decided to affiliate to the Labour Representation Committee. Its membership continued to grow, and in 1908 it appointed an assistant secretary, W. H. Dyer defeating Robert Banner in a ballot.

On 1 January 1911, the union finally merged with the London Consolidated Society of Journeymen Bookbinders, the Society of Day-working Bookbinders of London and the Vellum (Account Book) Binders' Trade Society, to form the National Union of Bookbinders and Machine Rulers.

== General Secretaries ==
1835: James Winkworth
1836: John Dickinson
1840:
1843: Henry Searson
1847: Hugh Shimmin
c.1850: William Mason
1855: William Robinson
1855: Charles Bacon
1858: John Roberts
1860: George Owen
1872: Richard Ballard
1881: Charles Lloyd
1884: Daniel Hughes
1888: David Sharpe
1899: James Kelly
