= National Committee of Organised Labour =

Pension reform organisation

The National Committee of Organised Labour for Promoting Old Age Pensions for All, often shortened to National Committee of Organised Labour, was a British campaign group established at the end of the nineteenth century which sought the introduction of a general-tax funded old-age pension. The campaign succeeded with the introduction of the Old Age Pensions Act 1908.

== Origins ==
Poverty in old age was, in the late 19th century, widely recognised by social reformers as a problem capable of solution. Canon W. L. Blackley, sometime Rector of North Waltham and of King's Somborne, had called for a sick-pay and pensions system based on national insurance contributions in 1878. From 1885 Charles Booth's work had provided insight into the poverty of old age. Trade unions, friendly societies, and individuals such as Joseph Chamberlain, Samuel Barnett, George Cadbury and Benjamin Seebohm Rowntree involved themselves in the issue.

A catalyst for concerted action was the passing, in New Zealand, of the Old-age Pensions Act, 1898, which provided means-tested benefits for aged people 'of good character'.

Francis Herbert Stead, warden of Browning Hall and an active campaigner for social reform, invited William Pember Reeves, the New Zealand Agent General in London to speak on a number of occasions at address Browning Hall, culminating in a conference on the subject held at the hall in December 1898 attended by friendly societies, trade unionists, and addressed by Charles Booth, amongst others. Regional meetings across the country were held in the months immediately following, and by May 1899 the National Committee of Organised Labour was formed to lead and coordinate a campaign.

== Organisation ==
Stead was appointed honorary secretary, and in July 1900 Frederick Booth was appointed Organising Secretary. Stead and Rogers dedicated a decade of work, writing pamphlets and books, lobbying parliament and religious leaders, and travelling the length of the country to speak for the cause. The campaign won the backing of concerned groups including the Trades Union Congress, the Labour Party Conference, and the Co-operative Congress, as well as by Friendly Societies.

The campaign was ended after the passing of the 1908 act, Stead going on to campaign for the provision of old-aged homes.
