= Vellum (Account Book) Binders' Trade Society =

Former trade union of the United Kingdom

The Vellum (Account Book) Binders' Trade Society was a British trade union formed in 1823, and with a tiny membership representing a small fraction of bookbinders.

It is perhaps best remembered in contemporary times for its president from 1892 to 1898, Frederick Rogers, who in 1900 acted as the first chairman of the Labour Representation Committee, the immediate forerunner of the British Labour Party. Rogers describes the union as small, old-fashioned and decidedly conservative. He assumed office after an unsuccessful industrial action from 1891 to 1892, in support of an eight-hour working day, resulted in the halving of its membership and severe depletion of its funds.

In 1911, it amalgamated with the Bookbinders and Machine Rulers' Consolidated Union, the Society of Day-working Bookbinders of London, Westminster, etc and the London Consolidated Society of Journeymen Bookbinders to form the National Union of Bookbinders and Machine Rulers.

== Secretaries ==
1892: A. Goodhew
1909: Edward Friend
