= William Morrison (poet) =

Irish poet

William (Billy) Morrison was born in County Antrim, Ireland, in a small village near Glengormley, called at Mallusk on 14 July 1881. He was a gifted poet and nature lover and his moving accounts of rural Mallusk remain particularly poignant today in light of the increasing industrialization of the area.

== Early life and family ==
Billy's original home was Old Bush House, a Blacksmiths Forge, located in one of the Barron Family's Dairy Fields. It was known as 'Frank's Field' after his blacksmith grandfather and was opposite the Old Scullion's Road where the Northern Bank is today.

His grandfather Francis Morrison married Margaret Ayr of Broughshane and had a family of three sons and four daughters. Their first son, Frank, the Bard's father, married John Adams's daughter Mary Elizabeth on 14 April 1876, her family owned the ‘Crown and Shamrock’ pub on the Antrim Road between Glengormley and Templepatrick.

Billy attended Mallusk National School at Trench Lane and his poem 'The Old Schoolhouse' is a classic account of 19th century schooldays.

== Spouses ==
Billy married twice. His first wife was Miss Nellie Vint, a teacher in Carnmoney School. After her death he married Miss Kathleen Cooke. The marriage to Ellen Vint was on 19 April 1916, the marriage to Kathleen Cooke was 3 March 1932.

== Working life ==
Billy worked in the linen trade, initially at the Hyde Park Works, Belfast, where he inspected cloth for shipment. His poem 'The Old Bleach Green' laments the passing of the once vibrant works at Hydepark, now in ruins.

One of the Weaver Poets, Thomas Beggs (1789–1847) worked at the same Bleaching works and lived in a nearby cottage at Hydepark. Billy also worked at Ewarts on the Crumlin Road, Belfast and during this time lived at Joanmount Gardens off the Oldpark Road.

The Bard was also a keen amateur journalist and cycled to events as a reporter and had many articles and poems published by the East Antrim Times, Belfast Telegraph and Ireland's Saturday Night. Morrison composed sales ditties for Belfast firms, such as his poem for Ivy bicycles a North Street shop.

"Ride the same Ivy,
So light and so neat,
Sold by Sam Cochrane,
Of Upper North Street"

== Poet and Nature Lover ==
Billy was a devotee of Robbie Burns and he and his wife made regular pilgrimages to Scotland, Burn's home country. His own poetry reflected his love of nature.

And he was clearly influenced by the beauty of the hills and countryside of North Belfast, including Boghill, Carrs Glen, Hazelwood and Ben Madigan.

== Most notable works ==
It was his attachment to his birthplace and the Barron family of The Dairy that gave him the inspiration for arguably his finest poem 'A Dream Of The Past', the last verse of which refers to the arrival of the Michelin Factory in the 1960s marking the beginning of the end of rural Mallusk.

== Legacy ==
Billy returned to his beloved Mallusk and retired to Rosevale Cottage (where Mallusk Play Park is today) until his death in 1973. He is buried along with his second wife in Mallusk Cemetery. At his funeral at Hydepark Presbyterian Church the Rev Corkey read a verse from one of his Poems.

The Bard's insightful writings remain an inspiration to the Village's environmental campaigners of today and their work in protecting what remains of rural Mallusk. The Mallusk Play Park was named in his memory in 2014, and will ensure that the legacy of William Morrison lasts and that his poems are enjoyed by future generations.

In 2012 the Mallusk Community Action Group (MCAG) published a collection of his poems. The collection's editor, Barry Macaulay, described the poems as "great social history pieces," evocative of a period before intense development of the area.
