= Manchester South West =

Parliamentary constituency in the United Kingdom, 1885–1918

- Former borough constituency for the House of Commons

1885–1918
- Created from: Manchester
- Replaced by: Manchester Hulme

Manchester South West was one of six single-member Parliamentary constituencies created in 1885 by the division of the existing three-member Parliamentary Borough of Manchester. It was abolished in 1918.

== Boundaries ==
The constituency, which was created by the Redistribution of Seats Act 1885, consisted of the civil parish of Hulme.

== Members of Parliament ==
Election	Member	Party
1885	Lord Frederick Spencer Hamilton	Conservative
1886	Jacob Bright	Liberal
1895	William Johnson Galloway	Conservative
1906	George Davy Kelley	Labour
1910 (Jan)	Arthur Colefax	Liberal Unionist
1910 (Dec)	Christopher Needham	Liberal
1918	constituency abolished	

== Elections ==
Decades:	1880s; 1890s; 1900s; 1910s

=== Elections in the 1880s ===
General election 1885: Manchester South West
Party	Candidate	Votes	%	±%
Conservative	Frederick Spencer Hamilton	3,929	53.9	
Liberal	Jacob Bright	3,362	46.1	
Majority		567	7.8	
Turnout		7,291	82.0	
Registered electors		8,890		
Conservative win (new seat)				

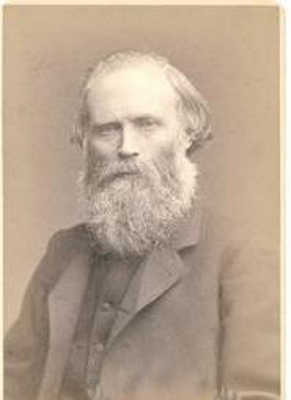
Bright

General election 1886: Manchester South West
Party	Candidate	Votes	%	±%
Liberal	Jacob Bright	3,570	50.8	+4.7
Conservative	Frederick Spencer Hamilton	3,459	49.2	−4.7
Majority		111	1.6	N/A
Turnout		7,029	79.1	−2.9
Registered electors		8,890		
Liberal gain from Conservative		Swing	+4.7	

=== Elections in the 1890s ===
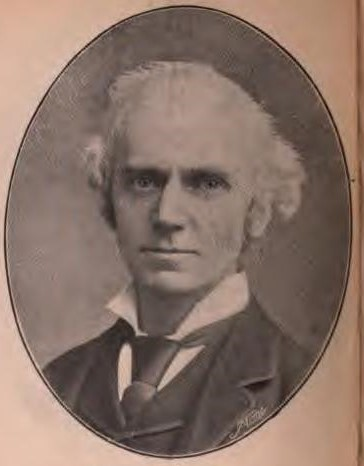
Hopkinson

General election 1892: Manchester South West
Party	Candidate	Votes	%	±%
Liberal	Jacob Bright	3,924	51.0	+0.2
Liberal Unionist	Alfred Hopkinson	3,776	49.0	−0.2
Majority		148	2.0	+0.4
Turnout		7,700	79.6	+0.5
Registered electors		9,674		
Liberal hold		Swing	+0.2	

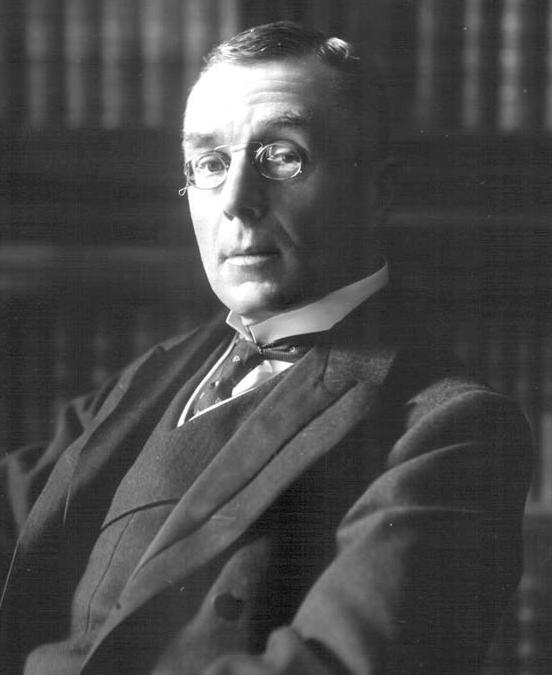
Astbury

General election 1895: Manchester South West
Party	Candidate	Votes	%	±%
Conservative	William Johnson Galloway	3,994	53.3	+4.3
Liberal	John Meir Astbury	3,496	46.7	−4.3
Majority		498	6.6	N/A
Turnout		7,490	78.9	−0.7
Registered electors		9,496		
Conservative gain from Liberal		Swing	+4.3	

=== Elections in the 1900s ===
General election 1900: Manchester South West
Party	Candidate	Votes	%	±%
Conservative	William Johnson Galloway	4,017	62.6	+9.3
Labour Repr. Cmte.	Fred Brocklehurst	2,398	37.4	New
Majority		1,619	25.2	+18.6
Turnout		6,415	70.5	−8.4
Registered electors		9,102		
Conservative hold		Swing		

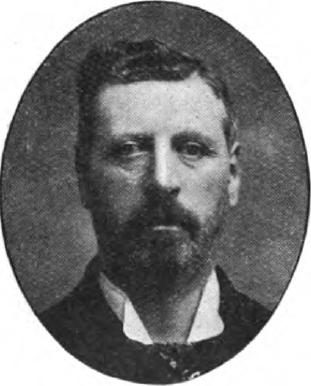
Kelley

General election 1906: Manchester South West
Party	Candidate	Votes	%	±%
Labour Repr. Cmte.	George Davy Kelley	4,101	58.8	+21.4
Conservative	William Johnson Galloway	2,875	41.2	−21.4
Majority		1,226	17.6	N/A
Turnout		6,976	81.6	+11.1
Registered electors		8,551		
Labour Repr. Cmte. gain from Conservative		Swing	+21.4	

=== Elections in the 1910s ===
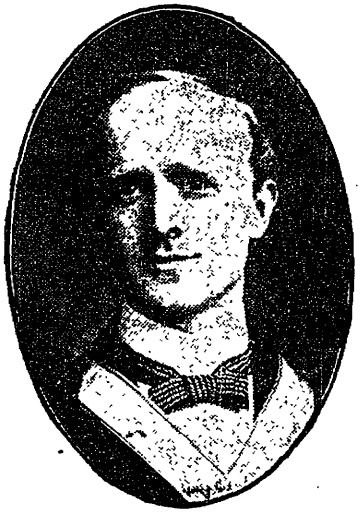
McLachlan

General election January 1910: Manchester South West
Party	Candidate	Votes	%	±%
Liberal Unionist	Arthur Colefax	3,111	42.4	+1.2
Liberal	Christopher Needham	3,004	41.0	New
Labour	J. M. McLachlan	1,218	16.6	−42.2
Majority		107	1.4	N/A
Turnout		7,333	89.6	+8.0
Liberal Unionist gain from Labour		Swing		

Needham

General election December 1910: Manchester South West
Party	Candidate	Votes	%	±%
Liberal	Christopher Needham	3,590	51.9	+10.9
Liberal Unionist	Arthur Colefax	3,331	48.1	+5.7
Majority		259	3.8	N/A
Turnout		6,921	84.6	−5.0
Liberal gain from Liberal Unionist		Swing	+2.6	

General Election 1914–15:

Another General Election was required to take place before the end of 1915. The political parties had been making preparations for an election to take place and by July 1914, the following candidates had been selected;

- Liberal: Christopher Needham
- Unionist:
