= National Union of Printing and Paper Workers =

Former trade union of the United Kingdom

The National Union of Printing and Paper Workers was a trade union representing workers in the printing industry in the United Kingdom.

The union was founded in 1914 by the merger of the National Amalgamated Society of Printers' Warehousemen and Cutters, the National Union of Paper Mill Workers, and the United Vellum and Parchment Makers of Great Britain. Alfred Evans, formerly of the Warehousemen and Cutters, became general secretary, while William Ross, formerly of the Paper Mill Workers, became assistant general secretary.

Membership of the union was more than 20,000, and it grew as the Male Relief Stampers' Society joined in 1919. In 1921, it merged with the National Union of Bookbinders and Machine Rulers to form the National Union of Printing, Bookbinding, Machine Ruling and Paper Workers.

== General Secretaries ==
1914: Alfred Evans
1918: Tom Newland

== Presidents ==
1914: R. H. Swift
1918: H. Chalk
