= National Amalgamated Society of Printers' Warehousemen and Cutters =

Former trade union of the United Kingdom

The National Amalgamated Society of Printers' Warehousemen and Cutters was a trade union in the United Kingdom.

== History ==
The union originated as the Printers' and Stationers' Warehousemen, Cutters and Assistants' Union, founded early in 1889 by Alfred Evans, who remained general secretary throughout its existence. Later in the year, it merged with the Amalgamated Society of Printers' Warehousemen to form the National Amalgamated Society, based in Fleet Street. By 1900, the union had 1,500 members, and it continued to grow rapidly, the Manchester Printers' and Stationers' Cutters' Union joining in 1901, and the union accepting women as members from 1902. In 1903, the National Bookfolders' and Kindred Trades Union affiliated to the National Amalgamated Society, becoming the union's women's section.

The Dublin Paper Cutters' Society joined the union in 1904. By 1910, it had 5,276 members, and by 1914, more than 9,000, more than a third being women, unusual for the period.

In 1914, the union merged with the National Union of Paper Mill Workers and the Vellum and Parchment Makers' Society to form the National Union of Printing and Paper Workers.

== Presidents ==
1899: R. H. Swift
1908: Tom Newland
1909: R. H. Swift
