= Bill Morrison (trade unionist) =

British trade union leader

William Alfred Morrison OBE was a British trade union leader.

Morrison became active in the National Union of Printing, Bookbinding and Paper Workers, and in 1938 was elected as secretary of its London Central branch, the largest branch of the union. In this role, he supported C. C. Diels in refusing to work with the Mosley News Letter, a fascist publication put out by Oswald Mosley. Mosley Publications took the two to the High Court, along with the uninvolved Cyril Watt, arguing that they were guilty of conspiracy to prevent their publications being printed, but Morrison and the union activists won the case. He was elected as general secretary of the National Union of Printing, Bookbinding and Paper Workers in 1947, taking 31,515 votes in the election, compared to 11,290 for Vincent Flynn, and 4,204 for F. A. J. Stickland.

While leader of the Paper Workers, Morrison played a prominent role in various other organisations. From 1950 until 1952 he was president of the bookbinders' group of the International Graphical Federation, and for many years he served on the executive committee of the IGF. In 1955, he was elected as vice-president of the Printing and Kindred Trades Federation, becoming president in 1956. In 1955, he was also chair of the scrutineers at the Trades Union Congress. He retired at the end of 1960, but in 1963 he was appointed to the committee of the Joint Industrial Council for the printing industries.

In 1957, Morrison was made an Officer of the Order of the British Empire.

Trade union offices
Preceded by Bill Spackman	General Secretary of the National Union of Printing, Bookbinding and Paper Workers; 1947–1960	Succeeded by Tom Smith
Preceded by R. T. Williams	President of the Printing and Kindred Trades Federation; 1957–1960	Succeeded by John Bonfield
