= Printing and Kindred Trades Federation =

UK trade union federation

- Founded: 8 September 1890
- Dissolved: December 1973
- Location: United Kingdom
- Members: 405,000 (1971)

The Printing and Kindred Trades Federation (P&KTF) was a trade union federation in the United Kingdom.

== History ==
The federation was established at a conference in Manchester on 8 September 1890, organised on the initiative of George D. Kelley. The conference was attended by eleven unions in the printing industry:

- Amalgamated Society of Lithographic Artists
- Amalgamated Society of Lithographic Printers
- Bookbinders' and Machine Rulers' Consolidated Union
- Leeds Typographical Society
- London Consolidated Lodge of Journeymen Bookbinders
- London Printing Machine Managers' Trade Society
- London Society of Compositors
- Scottish Typographical Association
- Typographical Association

The federation agreed to focus on recognising employers who conformed to the best practice of all its member unions, and to assist affiliates in supporting the pay and conditions of their members. But it would not organise strike action, or ask affiliates to financially support each other. The eleven unions each put membership of the new federation to their members; those based in London rejected it, while the five based outside approved it, and were joined by the Dublin Typographical Society and the Edinburgh Machinemen.

During the 1890s, the organisation achieved little, beyond forming local federations in various towns around the country. By 1896, it was said to exist only on paper, and proposals that year for affiliates to pay a membership fee were defeated, alternative proposals being successful in 1899. That year, new rules were drawn up to expand its remit, but affiliates were very slow to vote on whether to approve them. In the meantime, the London-based societies were planning their own rival federation. A conference in December 1900 between them and the P&KTF agreed the terms for a national federation, and this was finally established in 1902 as the National Printing and Kindred Trades Federation.

By 1903, the following unions were affiliated:

- Amalgamated Society of Lithographic Artists
- Amalgamated Society of Lithographic Printers
- Amalgamated Society of Pressmen
- Bookbinders' and Machine Rulers' Consolidated Union
- Lithographic Music Printers
- Lithographic Stone and Plate Preparers
- London Consolidated Society of Journeymen Bookbinders
- London Society of Compositors
- London Society of Lithographic Printers
- London Society of Machine Rulers
- National Amalgamated Society of Printers' Warehousemen and Cutters
- Operative Printers' Assistants' Society
- Scottish Typographical Association
- Stereotypers' Assistants' Society
- Typographical Association
- Vellum Binders' Society

Following its re-establishment, the federation held an annual conference, and from 1903 it elected an executive committee, which tried to maintain control over strikes by affiliates. A conciliation board was established in 1908, in conjunction with the Federation of Master Printers and Allied Trades, and the aim of avoiding industrial action, but as its use was voluntary, it did little. In 1919, the federation supported the establishment of the Joint Industrial Council for the Printing and Allied Trades, and organised an industry-wide agreement on holidays and working hours. It grew to include 23 members in 1927, and although there was a gradual process of mergers among its affiliates, the total number of workers it represented generally grew, reaching 320,000 in 1956, and 405,000 in 1971. The federation continued to negotiate agreements on sick pay, redundancy and pensions, although it never involved itself in the setting of wages themselves.

The P&KTF was run by a large administrative council, on which each union had at least one representative, but larger unions had several - at its peak, the Society of Graphical and Allied Trades (SOGAT) had 33 members of the council. One seat was reserved for a woman, while the other seats were consistently filled by men. The administrative council elected an executive committee of fifteen members, a president and vice president, while a general secretary, assistant general secretary and assistant secretary carried out most of the work of the federation.

By the 1970s, continued mergers had reduced the role of the P&KTF. Two of the three unions with the largest number of print workers, the National Society of Operative Printers and Assistants (NATSOPA) and SOGAT, voted to disband the federation in 1972. Although they were defeated by the smaller members, SOGAT decided not to attend any further meetings of the federation. The remaining members attempted to reorganise the federation as the "Printing Trade Unions Co-ordinating Bureau", but NATSOPA was unhappy with the planned financial arrangements, and declared it would not remain part of such an organisation. The organisation decided that there was no point in continuing without the two largest unions in the sector and voted to dissolve in December 1973.

== Membership ==
Members in 1969 included:

- National Graphical Association
- National Union of Journalists
- National Society of Operative Printers and Assistants
- National Union of Wallcoverings, Decorative and Allied Trades
- Sign and Display Trade Union
- Society of Graphical and Allied Trades
- Society of Lithographic Artists, Designers and Engravers
- Scottish Typographical Association

== General Secretaries ==
1891: George Davy Kelley
1911: Albert Edward Holmes
1941: John Fletcher
1958: Granville Eastwood
1974: Gloria Hart (acting)

== Presidents ==
1891: C. J. Drummond
c.1892: Henry Slatter
c.1897: A. W. Jones
c.1910: C. W. Bowerman
1939: George Isaacs
1945: Walter C. Warren
1952: R. T. Williams
1957: Bill Morrison
1961: John Bonfield
