= National Union of Bookbinders and Machine Rulers =

Former trade union of the United Kingdom

- Merged into: National Union of Printing, Bookbinding, Machine Ruling and Paper Workers
- Founded: 1911
- Dissolved: 1921
- Headquarters: 9 Independent Buildings, Fargate, Sheffield
- Location: United Kingdom
- Members: 7,000 (1912)
- Affiliations: Trades Union Congress

The National Union of Bookbinders and Machine Rulers was a trade union representing bookbinders and related workers in the United Kingdom.

The union was founded in 1911 when the Bookbinders' and Machine Rulers' Consolidated Union merged with the London Consolidated Society of Journeymen Bookbinders, the Vellum Account Book Binders' Trade Society and the Day Working Bookbinders of London. Many Dublin-based members of the union left in 1920 to form the Irish Bookbinders' and Paper Rulers' Trade Union.

In 1921, the union merged with the National Union of Printing and Paper Workers to form the National Union of Printing, Bookbinding, Machine Ruling and Paper Workers.

== General Secretaries ==
1911: James Kelly
