= 1927 Southwark North by-election =

UK parliamentary by-election

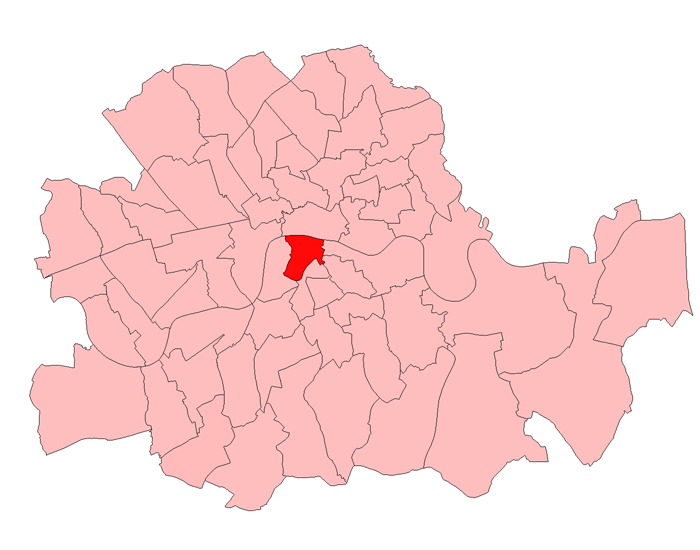
Southwark North in the County of London from 1918 to 1949.

The 1927 Southwark North by-election was a parliamentary by-election for the UK House of Commons constituency of Southwark North held on Wednesday, 28 March 1927.

The election was won by Edward Strauss of the Liberal Party, regaining the seat from the Labour Party.

== Vacancy ==
The by-election was caused by the resignation of the sitting Labour MP, Leslie Haden-Guest. Haden-Guest had represented Southwark North since the 1923 general election but found himself increasingly at odds with official Labour Party policy. The immediate cause of Haden-Guest's resignation from the Parliamentary Labour Party was the policy the party had adopted in respect of the Chinese Civil War. Haden-Guest believed that Labour's policy was tantamount to a call for intervention in the civil war and was therefore in contravention to the policy agreed at the party conference in Margate in 1926 and that as a consequence; British citizens in Shanghai would be put at risk. Labour Party leader Ramsay MacDonald called on Haden-Guest to resign his seat, assuming that Labour would be able to hold it at the ensuing by-election. Haden-Guest declared that he was willing to contest a by-election, standing as an Independent Constitutionalist. There was never any Constitutional Party as such with any centralised organisation but it fielded candidates at the 1924 general election in constituencies where local Conservative and Liberal parties were willing to join forces against socialism. Haden-Guest sought local Conservative Party backing for his candidacy, attending a meeting of the North Southwark Conservative Association on 3 March 1927 – although making it clear he would not stand as a Conservative. They endorsed his stance against Labour's Chinese policy which they described as 'anti-British' and their candidate, Rear Admiral Humphrey Hugh Smith announced his willingness to stand aside for Haden-Guest at a by-election urging local Conservative supporters to vote for him. Smith later reinforced and justified his position in a letter to The Times later in the campaign.

Haden-Guest resigned from Parliament using the traditional device of applying for the Chiltern Hundreds.

== Previous result ==
General election, 29 October 1924 Electorate: 25,897
Party	Candidate	Votes	%	±%
Labour	Leslie Haden-Guest	8,115	43.8	−7.4
Liberal	Edward Strauss	7,085	38.3	−10.5
Unionist	J G Llewellin	3,305	17.9	New
Majority		1,030	5.5	+3.1
Turnout		18,505	71.5	+11.8
Labour hold		Swing		

== Candidates ==
- At an early stage after Haden-Guest's resignation from the Parliamentary Labour Party, it seemed that Labour was anxious to use the opportunity of a by-election to get William Wedgwood Benn into Parliament as a Labour MP. Benn had been Liberal MP for the St George's division of Tower Hamlets in east London from 1906 until 1918 and then for Leith in Scotland, a seat he held until March 1927, when he resigned from the Liberal Party and from Parliament. Despite the flurry of attention paid by the press to a possible candidacy by Wedgwood Benn, Labour was also reported to be considering George Isaacs. Isaacs was a trade union official, being general secretary of the National Society of Operative Printers and Assistants. He was the former MP for Gravesend and had fought Southwark North at the 1918 general election. Another name apparently being considered was that of Herbert Morrison who was at that time secretary of the London Labour Party, having previously been MP for Hackney South and who was a member of the London County Council. On 10 March 1927 Labour unanimously adopted Mr Isaacs.
- The Liberals re-selected the experienced Edward Strauss. Strauss was a corn, grain and hop merchant by profession but he had entered politics and was the local MP from 1918 to 1923, having also previously represented Abingdon and Southwark West.
- The Conservatives honoured their promise to Haden-Guest, choosing not to put up a candidate and supporting his campaign.

== Campaign ==
Haden-Guest and his Conservative backers wished to present the by-election as a struggle between socialism and constitutional government. They declared that the duty of the electorate was to revolt against a Labour Party they believed was drifting increasingly leftwards. For this reason they were horrified by the decision of the Liberal Party to intervene in the contest and risk splitting the anti-socialist vote. Haden-Guest's split with Labour over China appears to have been symptomatic of wider differences of opinion with the party. He had already taken a different line on the issue of the 1926 General Strike. Opinions also diverged on foreign and Empire policy issues. Haden-Guest was a supporter of Imperial Preference which brought him into conflict with party policy and he had a reputation as a strong supporter of the Empire.

Strauss indicated he would support an orthodox Liberal approach in line with a recent speech by Liberal Party Deputy Leader Sir Herbert Samuel, adhering strongly to the traditional Liberal policy of Free Trade.

Haden-Guest wished not only to appeal to the electorate on the basis of his opposition to Labour policy and what he and the Conservatives were presenting as the struggle between constitutional government and socialism. He wanted to stress his local credentials and commitment to the community as a former medical officer of the London County Council with a clinic in the heart of the Borough of Southwark where he cared for large numbers of local people.

Strauss had well-established local credentials of his own. He had been MP for Southwark West from 1910 to 1918, for Southwark North from 1918 to 1922 and had twice fought the seat since then. His campaign devoted much time and effort to local issues in addition to the national and Imperial questions which were dominating the fight between Haden-Guest and Isaacs. Strauss picked up on voter dissatisfaction with housing policy. He resurrected his proposals for the building of homes for working-class tenants in Borough High Street which he had campaigned for after the end of the Great War but for which the local Labour borough council had refused to grant the necessary planning permission. The Liberals also tried to knock the shine off Haden-Guest's medical good works by pointing out that his clinic was not personally funded by him, as some Constitutionalist supporters were happy to imply.

== Result ==
The result was a gain for the Liberal Party with Strauss obtaining a majority of 1,167 over Isaacs with Haden-Guest a distant third with less than 20% of the poll.

Southwark North by-election, 1927: Electorate 26,601
Party	Candidate	Votes	%	±%
Liberal	Edward Strauss	7,334	43.9	+5.6
Labour	George Isaacs	6,167	36.9	−6.9
Constitutionalist	Leslie Haden-Guest	3,215	19.2	New
Majority		1,167	7.0	N/A
Turnout		16,716	62.8	−8.7
Liberal gain from Labour		Swing	+6.3	

In his speech to the crowd after the count, Haden-Guest condemned the Liberal intervention in the by-election as opportunistic. He seemed to feel that it was for him to decide the issue on which the election was determined, rather than the electors of Southwark North. He displayed a proprietarial disposition towards the electorate saying that Strauss had "......intrude[d] on what I had hoped was going to be the direct vote of my own people on the unpatriotic attitude of the Labour Party."

== Aftermath ==
Strauss' victory, together with a number of other Liberal gains from the Conservatives which followed in the rest of 1927 and into 1928 led the Liberals to hope for a political revival, which it was believed would reap dividends at the next general election which was due by 1929. However, many Liberal analysts – including David Lloyd George – were cautious, worrying that a combination of three-cornered contests and growing Labour strength in industrial areas would weigh seriously against them under the first-past-the-post electoral system. Strauss himself spoke for those who had faith that revival had come. He felt the doomsayers had got it all wrong and shared a widespread Liberal hope that the electorate, disillusioned by the government of Stanley Baldwin yet unwilling to turn to the socialist ideas of Labour would rally to the Liberal cause. He wrote to one sceptic saying,"I cannot allow you to cast any doubt on the reality of the Liberal revival." The outcome of the 1929 general election saw the fears of the doubters realised however with only a limited increase in Liberal representation in the House of Commons and in Southwark North Strauss was unable to hold off a renewed challenge by Isaacs who took the seat by a majority of 432.

General election, 30 May 1929 Electorate 32,340
Party	Candidate	Votes	%	±%
Labour	George Isaacs	9,660	45.8	+2.0
Liberal	Edward Strauss	9,228	43.8	+5.5
Unionist	Marcus Samuel	2,198	10.4	−7.5
Majority		432	2.0	N/A
Turnout		21,386	65.2	−6.3
Labour gain from Liberal		Swing	+4.5	

== See also ==
- List of United Kingdom by-elections
- United Kingdom by-election records
