= Hannah Bevan =

British philanthropist

Hannah Marishall Bevan
- Born: 1 February 1798; London
- Died: 7 November 1874 (aged 76); Penge
- Known for: Philanthropy
- Spouse: Thomas Bevan MD
- Relatives: Thomas Bevan (politician) (son) Theodore Francis Bevan (explorer) (grandson) Thomas Bevan (cricketer) (Great grandson) David Lean (Great grandson)

Hannah Marishall Bevan or Hannah Marishall Bennett (1 February 1798 – 7 November 1874) was a British philanthropist. She visited convict ships and workhouses and was involved in creating the Band of Hope in London.

== Life ==
Bevan was born in London in 1798 to a Quaker family, William and Hannah (born Fossick) Bennett. Her father was a tea merchant. When she was twelve she was sent to Croydon for schooling. Her mother suffered from partial paralysis as the result of a stroke and on her return she cared for her until her death. Her father died soon after, in 1818, leaving Bevan as head of the family business and head of the family of herself and her two brothers, one of whom died at an early age.

Elizabeth Fry started the "British Ladies Society for promoting the reform of female prisoners" in 1821 after visiting a prison and being horrified by the conditions. Bevan joined Fry's new society. In 1822 Bevan was listed as one of Elizabeth Pryor's helpers visiting convict ships, together with Elizabeth Hanbury and Katherine Fry. Hanbury would in time take over the organisation of convict ship visiting after Elizabeth Pryor was disowned after she asked the prison authorities for remuneration.

In 1827 she stopped visiting ships but continued to attend meetings until 1831. In 1827 she married the surgeon Thomas Bevan, and in 1828 she had their first child and became a Quaker minister. The following year her child died, but during the time of 1829 to 1842 she and Thomas had seven more children. She and some friends started the Foster Street ragged school in about 1847. Ragged schools hoped to supply some type of education and inspire children to work, but they also realised that some benefit was obtained by just keeping children out of the cold. The Foster Street school was still operating in 1865 and it was member of the Ragged School Union. During this time she stopped attending prison reform meetings and there is no record of her attending after 1831.

The first "Band of Hope" in London was formed at her house by Thomas Bywater Smithies and it included some of her neighbours and children.

Her husband and two youngest children died in 1847. Five years later she was in Darlington where she took an interest in improving the lot of children, in particular, in the local workhouse. She had a long decline starting in 1859 in Darlington that progressed via a stroke and taking her to London where she died in Penge in 1874.
