= Bedford Pim =

English naval officer and barrister (1826–1886)

Rear-Admiral Bedford Pim FRGS
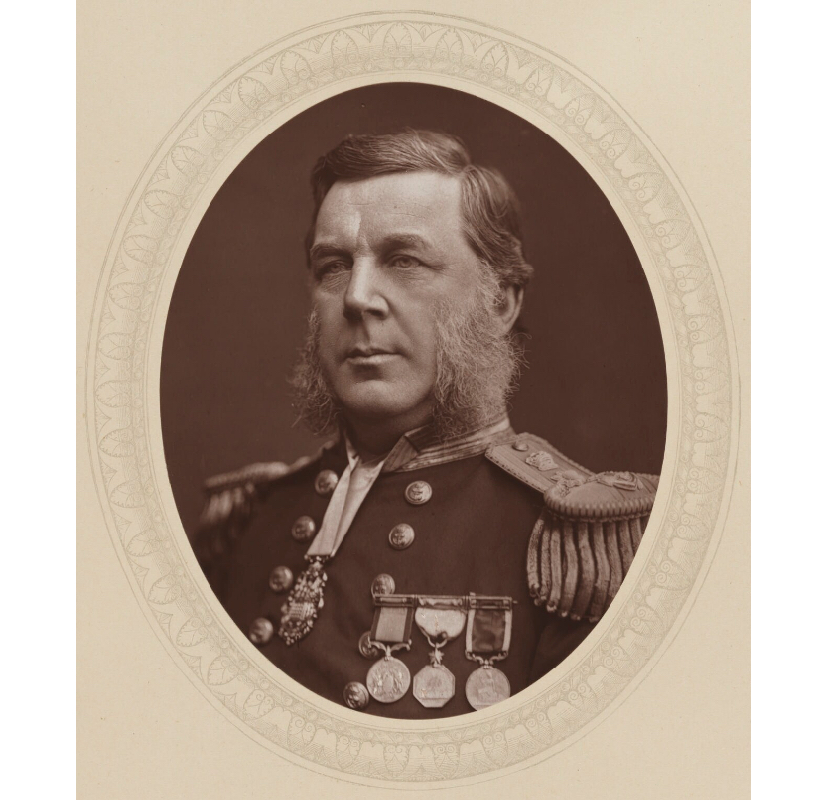

Member of Parliament for Gravesend
- In office 6 February 1874 – 3 April 1880
- Preceded by: Sir Charles Wingfield
- Succeeded by: Thomas Bevan

Personal details
- Born: Bedford Clapperton Trevelyan Pim; 12 December 1826 Bideford, Devon, England
- Died: 30 September 1886 (aged 59) Deal, Kent, England
- Party: Conservative
- Spouse: Susanna Locock (m. 1861)
- Education: Royal Naval School

Military service
- Branch: Royal Navy
- Years of service: 1842–1870
- Rank: Rear-Admiral
- Commands: HMS Magpie (1855); HMS Banterer (1855); HMS Gorgon (1837); HMS Fury (1845)
- Wars: Crimean War; Second Opium War

Bedford Clapperton Trevelyan Pim FRGS (12 June 1826 – 30 September 1886) was a Royal Navy officer, Arctic explorer, barrister, and author. He was the first man who travelled from a ship on the eastern side of the Northwest Passage to one on the western side.

== Early years ==
Pim was born in Bideford, Devon, England, son of Edward Bedford Pim of Weirhead, Exeter, a British navy officer who died of yellow fever in 1830 off the coast of Africa while engaged in the suppression of the slave trade, and Sophia Soltau Harrison, eldest daughter of John Fairweather Harrison, Esquire of Totnes. Educated at the Royal Naval School, the younger Pim went to India in the British Merchant Navy, and in 1842, upon return to England, was appointed a volunteer in the Royal Navy.

== Career ==
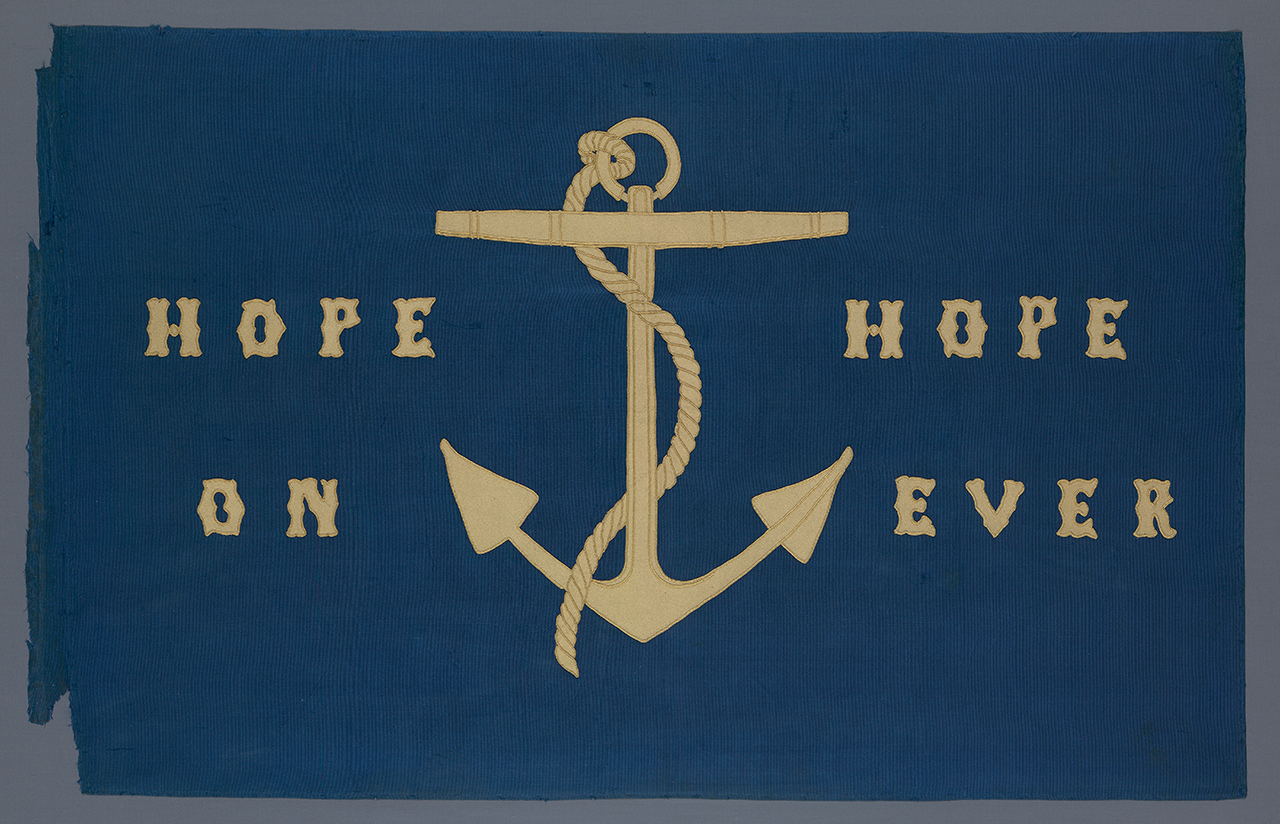
Flag flown by Pim on his sledge John Barrow during the 1852–1854 search for Franklin's expedition

In 1845, Pim was posted to the survey ship, HMS Herald, under Captain Henry Kellett. By 1846 he was in command of the 'Owen,' one of the Herald's tenders which made extensive surveys on the Pacific side of the Isthmus of Central America. In 1847 he travelled with Berthold Carl Seemann on a journey across the Cordillera of the Andes. He also took part in surveys in the Falkland Islands, the western coast of South America, and north to British Columbia. During this time he took part in three detours to search for the missing Sir John Franklin expedition. He transferred from Herald to HMS Plover, wintering at Chamisso Island in Kotzebue Sound during 1849/50, spending considerable time with the local Malimiut, before returning to Herald. He was promoted to lieutenant in 1851, and in April 1852 he returned to the Arctic, taking part in the rescue of Robert McClure and the crew of HMS Investigator. Pim was the first man to travel from a ship on the eastern side of the Northwest Passage to one on the western side.

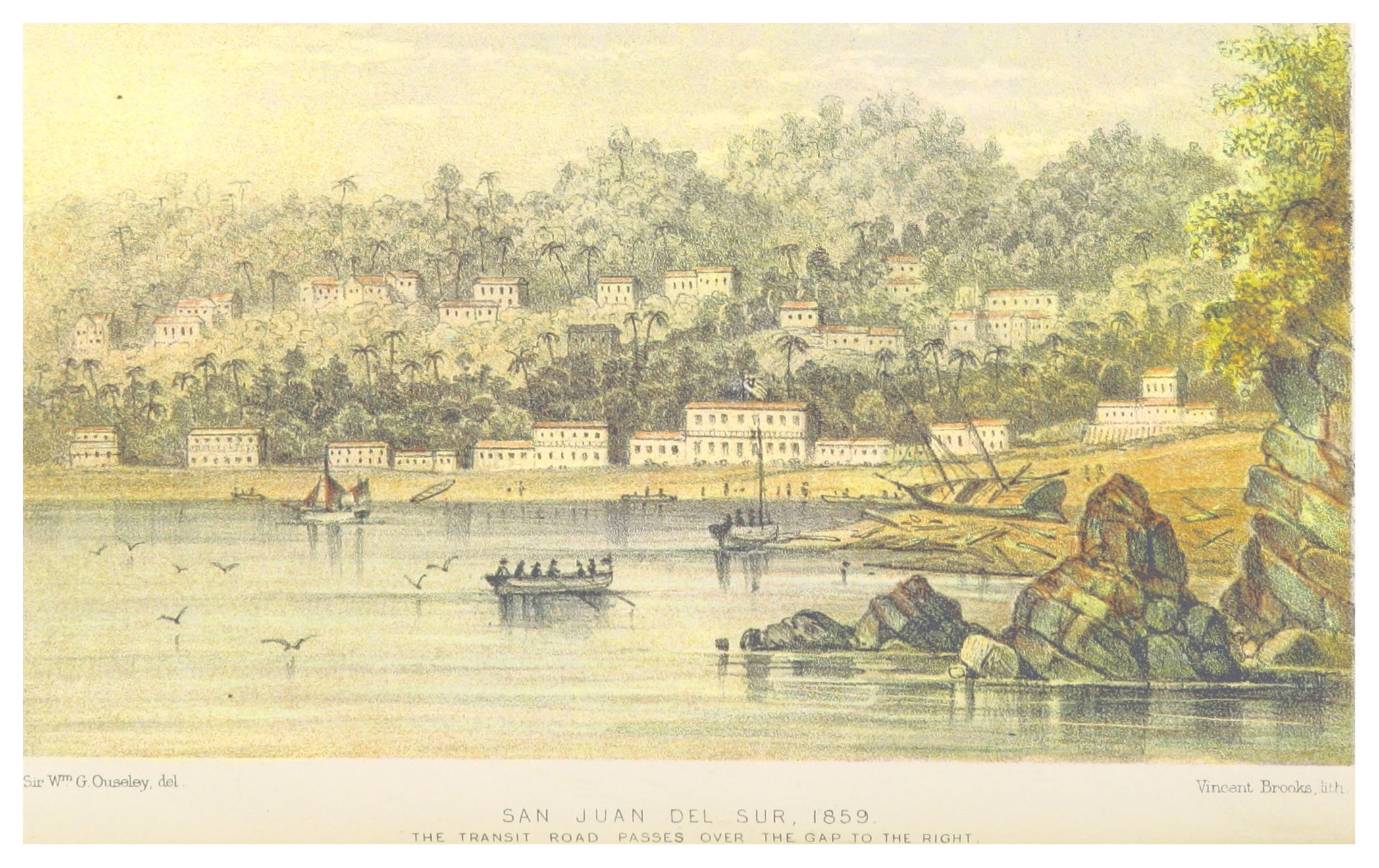
San Juan del Sur, Nicaragua, an image extracted from The Gate of the Pacific by Bedford Clapperton Trevelyan Pim, illustrated with lithographs by Vincent Brooks

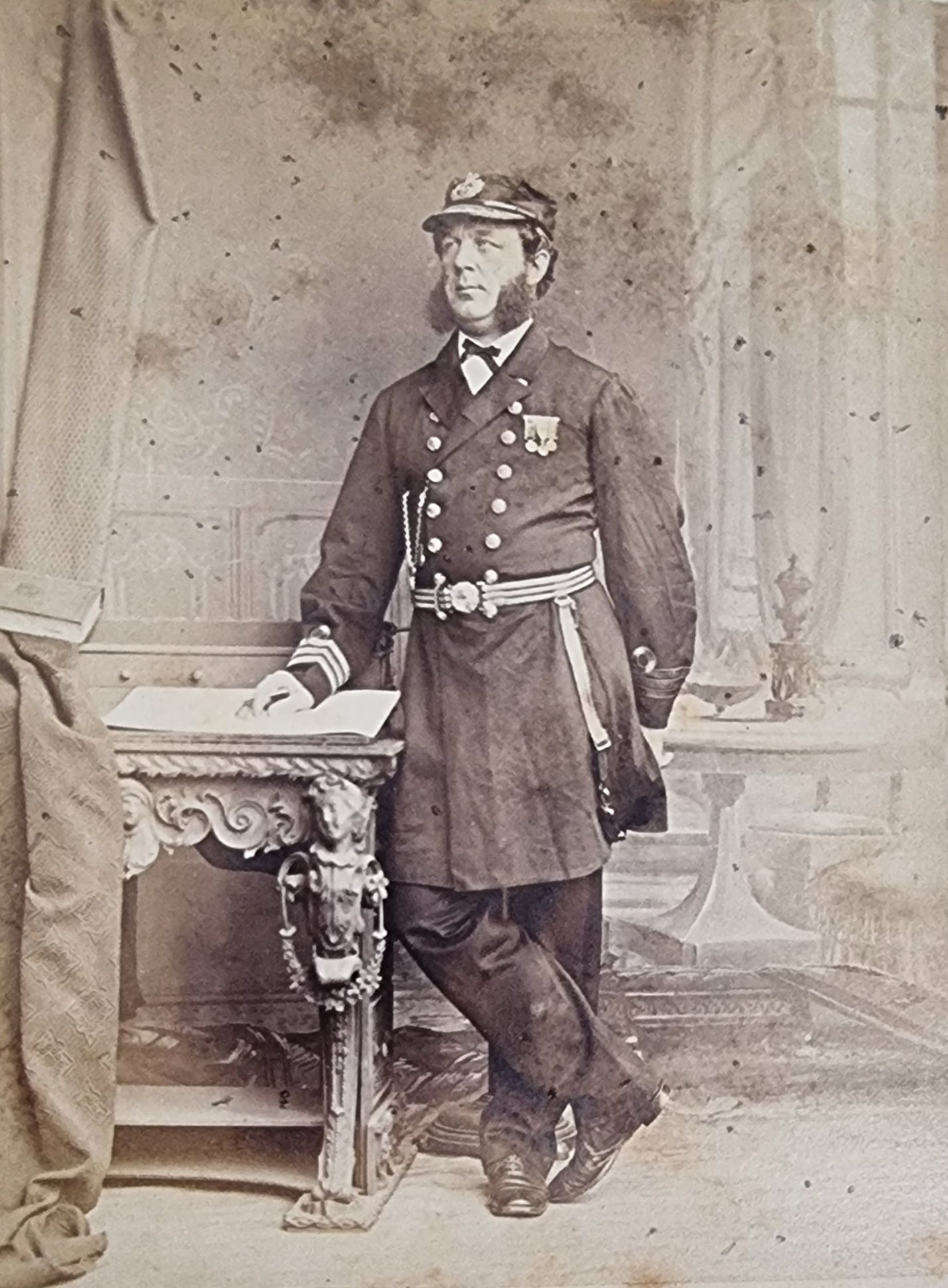
Bedford Pim, c. 1866, by Ernest Edwards

Pim served in the Baltic in 1855 during the Crimean War commanding HMS Magpie where he was wounded.

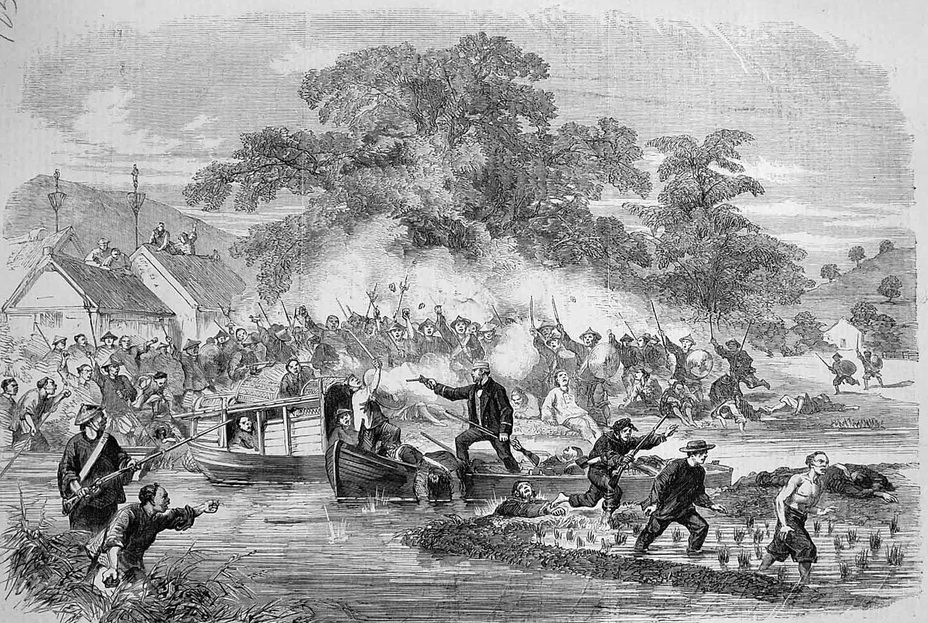
The war in China, the attack on the "Banterer's" boat in Sai-Lau Creek, Canton River on 13 December 1857. Pim fends off the attackers.

He was wounded again in 1857 while commanding HMS Banterer in Chinese waters.

He was made a commander in 1858. The following year, he investigated the possibility of a transoceanic canal and became a proponent of the Nicaragua Canal.

Pim went to the West Indies in command of HMS Gorgon in 1860 and returned home on HMS Fury. He made post captain in 1868 and was compulsorily retired in 1870. He studied law after retirement and was called to the Bar of the Inner Temple in 1873. Pim practiced law in Bristol, mainly on admiralty cases, and became a magistrate for the county of Middlesex. He wrote, When Do Sheriffs Take Office? in 1879.

A Conservative, Pim stood unsuccessfully for election in Totnes in July 1865 and Gravesend in December 1868. He was elected Member of Parliament for Gravesend in 1874. Pim was made rear-admiral in 1885.

Pim wrote several articles, books, and pamphlets. "Remarks on the Isthmus of Suez, with Special Reference to the Proposed Canal" was published in the Proceedings of the Royal Geographical Society of London in 1859, and Proposed Transit-Route across Central America, from a New Harbour in Nicaragua was published three years later. His 1839 A Brief sketch of the life of the late Zachary Macaulay, Esq., F.R.S. As connected with the subjects of the abolition of the slave trade and slavery was his only biography. His journals as a Midshipman aboard the Herald provided most of the discussion for the Arctic portions of the six-year cruise.

== Organisations ==
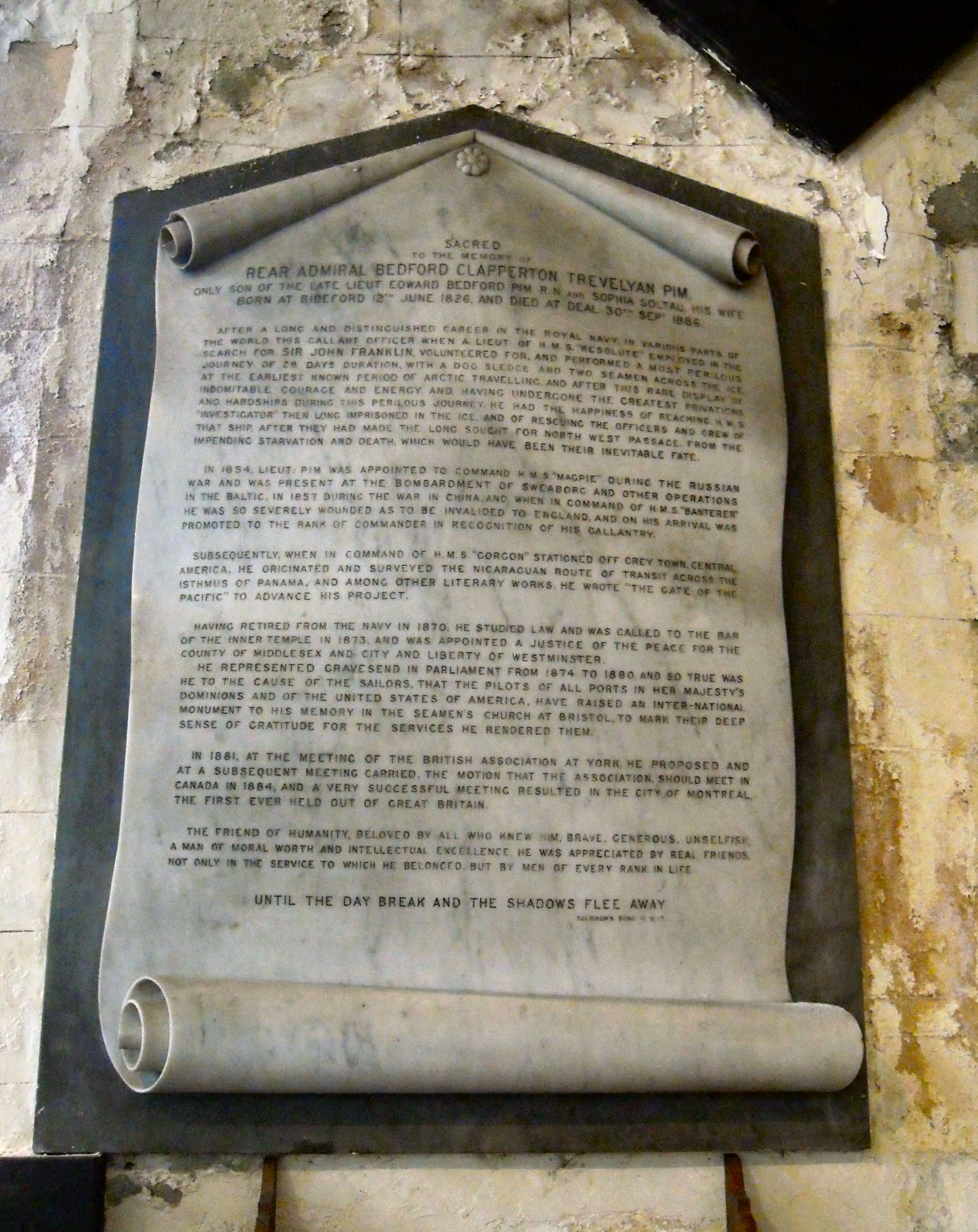
Memorial to Admiral Bedford Pim in St Mary's church in Bideford, Devon

Pim belonged to several scientific organisations. He was elected a Fellow of the Royal Geographical Society in 1854. In 1861, he became an associate of the Institute of Civil Engineers. He was also an honorary member of the Dulwich College Science Society.

== Personal life ==
Pim was a major landowner in Central America and the Caribbean. He married Susanna Locock on 3 October 1861 and they had two sons, including the Rev. Henry Bedford Pim. They lived for a time at Belsize and Dulwich. Pim died at Deal, Kent, England, on 30 September 1886. A brass plaque honoring Pim was moved in 1981 from The Missions to Seamen Institute to St. Nicholas Church, Bristol, England.

Pim was a virulent racist. In both The Negro and Jamaica and Dottings on the Roadside he articulated personal concerns with the supposed "savagery" of African peoples. Despite the acclaim Pim has garnered for his explorations, many of his personal observations of Africans in Jamaica perpetuated falsely racist claims about cannibalism and profligacy.

== Legacy ==
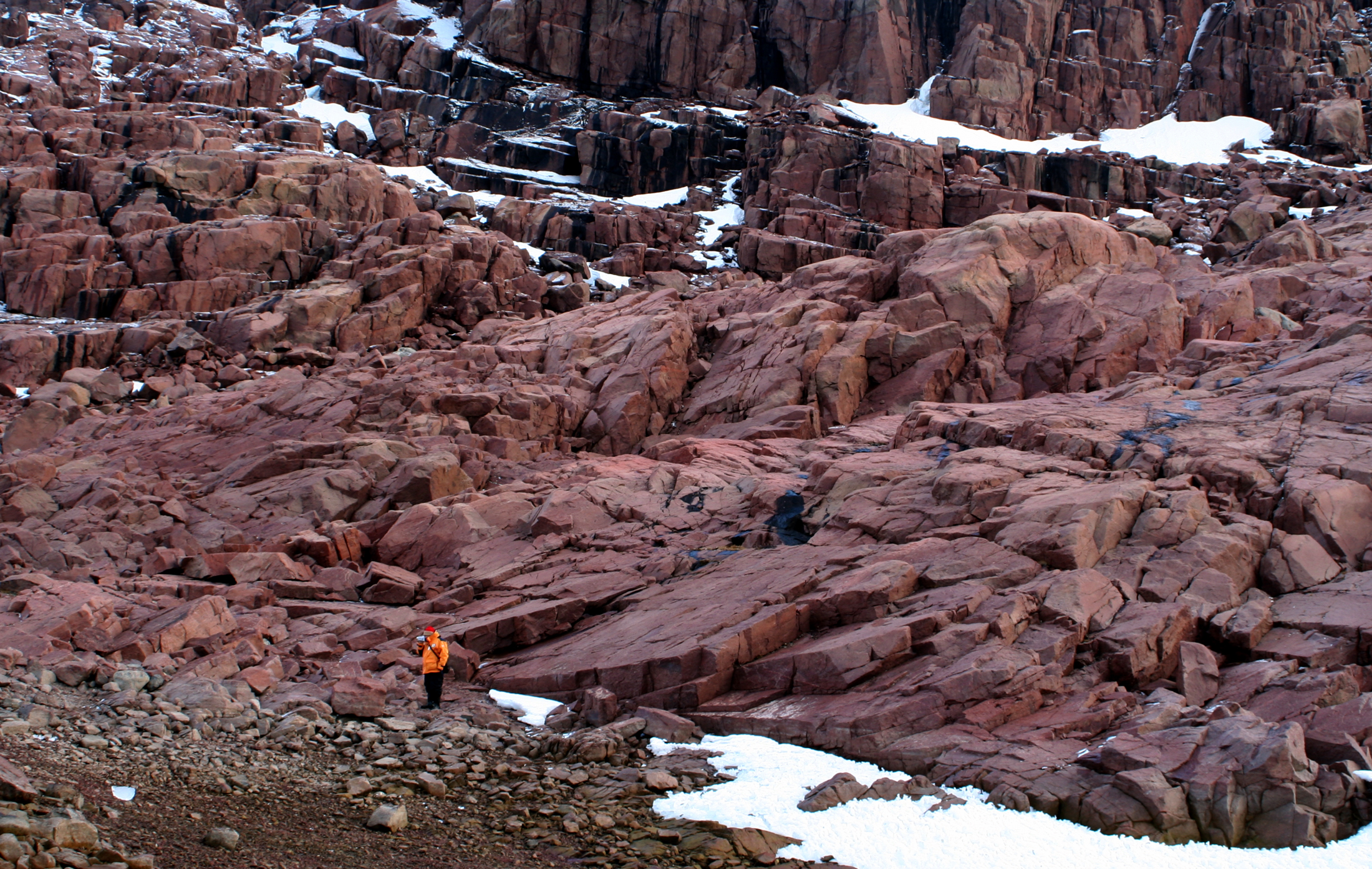
Pim Island (2005)

- Pim Island, Nunavut, Canada.
- Pim's Bay (variant Monkey Point), 40 mi (64 km) of Greytown, Nicaragua

== Partial works ==
- (1857) An earnest appeal to the British public on behalf of the missing Arctic Expedition.
- (1858) Notes on Cherbourg.
- (1863) The Gate of the Pacific.
- (1868) The negro and Jamaica. Read before the Anthropological Society of London, etc.
- (1869) Dottings on the Roadside in Panama, Nicaragua, and Mosquito ... Illustrated with plates and maps.
- (s.d.) War chronicle, with memoirs of the emperor Napoleon III, the emperor-King William I, map and official documents, from the breaking out of the war to the final evacuation of French territory by the German troops.
- In the 1870s he was the proprietor of a newspaper "The Navy Royal and Mercantile". Edition no.38 volume II bears the date "Saturday, Feb 13, 1875".
- (1876) British Manufacturing Industries series, vol. 10: "Ship-building"
- (1877) The Eastern question, past, present and future : with official documents.
- (1881). Gems from Greenwich Hospital.
- (1883). Transit across Central America.

Parliament of the United Kingdom
Preceded by Sir Charles John Wingfield	Member of Parliament for Gravesend; 1874–1880	Succeeded by Thomas Bevan
