= Sir William Dunn, 1st Baronet, of Clitheroe =

British Conservative politician

Sir William Henry Dunn, 1st Baronet (8 October 1856 – 12 June 1926) was a British Conservative Party politician and 589th Lord Mayor of London.

== Life ==
Dunn was born in Clitheroe, Lancashire. By profession he was an auctioneer and surveyor, a Fellow of the Surveyors' Institution. He was a well-known figure in the business and civic life of the City of London. He was an Alderman of the City of London and Sheriff in 1906–1907. He was Lord Mayor of London in 1916–1917. He was also a Liveryman of several of the City Guilds and an officer in the Territorial Force.

He was elected as Conservative Member of Parliament (MP) for Southwark West in the general election of January 1910, taking the seat from the sitting Liberal MP Richard Causton. However he lost the seat back to the Liberals in December 1910, losing to Edward Anthony Strauss.

He was knighted in 1907 and created a baronet in 1917. He was succeeded in the baronetcy by his son John Henry Dunn, who was only located many years later working at a coal mine near Barnsley.

== Family ==
Dunn was married to Ellen Pawle in 1885; the couple had a son and a daughter.

Honorary titles
| Preceded by Charles Wakefield | Lord Mayor of London; 1916–1917 | Succeeded by Charles Hanson |
Parliament of the United Kingdom
| Preceded by Richard Causton | Member of Parliament for Southwark West; January 1910 – December 1910 | Succeeded by Edward Anthony Strauss |
Baronetage of the United Kingdom
| New creation | Baronet (of Clitheroe); 1917–1926 | Succeeded by John Henry Dunn |
