= 1898 Gravesend by-election =

UK Parliamentary by-election

The 1898 Gravesend by-election was a Parliamentary by-election held on 13 July 1898. The constituency returned one Member of Parliament (MP) to the House of Commons of the United Kingdom, elected by the first past the post voting system.

The seat had become vacant following the resignation of the incumbent Conservative MP, James Dampier Palmer. Palmer vacated his Parliamentary seat by being appointed Steward of the Chiltern Hundreds on 2 July 1898. Palmer had been Member of Parliament for the constituency since 1892.

Palmer’s pending resignation was made public at the start of June.

== Candidates ==
The Conservative candidate was John Ryder. Ryder was a partner in the banking firm of Messrs. Coutts and Co. He was Deputy Lieutenant for Staffordshire.

The Liberal Party candidate was Walter Runciman. Runciman was adopted on 28 June 1898. He was the son of Walter Runciman, a Newcastle upon Tyne shipping magnate.

A third candidate, H. W. Davies, withdrew before nominations.

The date of nominations was set as Saturday 9 July with polling on Wednesday 13 July.

There were seven polling stations.

== Result ==
The Conservative Party held the seat with a reduced majority.

1898 Gravesend by-election
Party	Candidate	Votes	%	±%
Conservative	John Ryder	2,372	54.8	−11.6
Liberal	Walter Runciman	1,955	45.2	+11.6
Majority		417	9.6	−23.2
Turnout		4,327	82.0	+9.6
Registered electors		5,276		
Conservative hold		Swing	-11.6	
