= Charles John Wingfield =

British civil servant and politician

Sir Charles John Wingfield KCSI CB
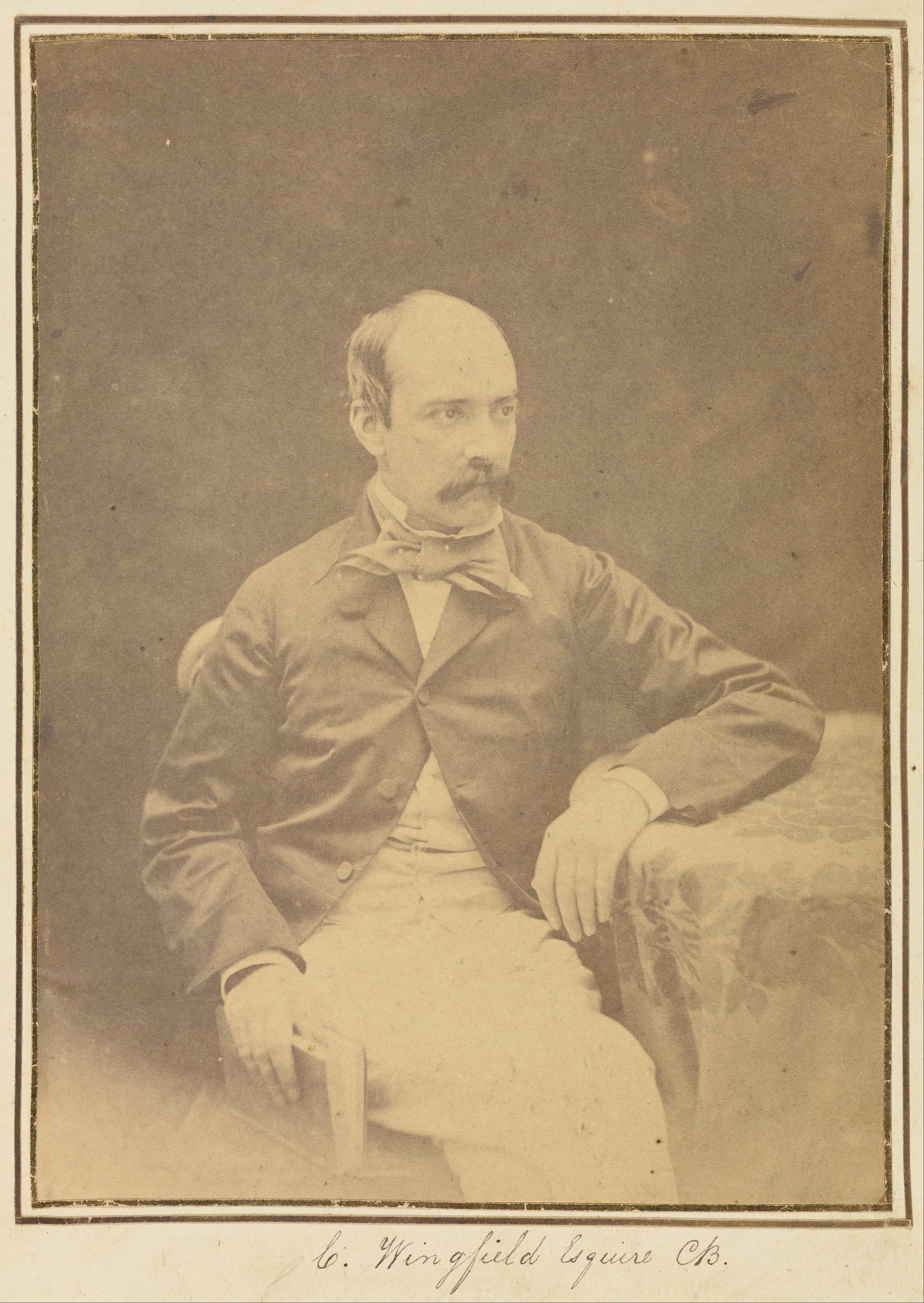
- Photograph by Felice Beato, 1858–1859

Member of Parliament for Gravesend
- In office 18 November 1868 – 5 February 1874
- Preceded by: New constituency
- Succeeded by: Bedford Clapperton Trevelyan Pim

Personal details
- Born: 16 April 1820
- Died: 27 January 1892 (aged 71)
- Party: Liberal
- Profession: Bengal Civil Service

Sir Charles John Wingfield KCSI CB (16 April 1820 – 27 January 1892) was a British civil servant and politician. He had a distinguished career with the Bengal Civil Service, was later elected as the first Member of Parliament for the United Kingdom's Parliament constituency of Gravesend.

== Early years ==
Wingfield was educated at Westminster School and Haileybury.

Wingfield's father, William Wingfield (1772–1858), was a Master in Chancery and served as a member of parliament for Bodmin in 1806. William changed his surname to Wingfield-Baker in 1849 by Royal licensure after his inheritance of Orsett Hall in Essex. Several of William's children changed their surname as well. From William's first marriage to Lady Charlotte-Maria (died 1807), eldest daughter of Henry Digby, 1st Earl Digby, Wingfield had several older half siblings including: George-Digby, John-Digby, Mary, Caroline, Frances-Eliza, and Richard Baker Wingfield-Baker, a member of parliament for South Essex.

By his father's marriage to Wingfield's mother, Elizabeth Mills, Wingfield had several additional siblings, including: William-Wriothesley-Digby, Frederick, Henry, Kenelm-Digby, Julia, and Lucy.

== Career ==
Wingfield served in the Bengal Civil Service from 1840 to 1866. He was a proponent of Charles Canning's clemency policy during the Indian Rebellion of 1857. While in the BCS, he held several offices including Commissioner of Gorakhpur, which is the post he held when appointed Companion of the Order of the Bath on 18 May 1860, and Vice-Chairman of the East India Association's Council. From 15 February 1859 to 20 April 1860, he was the Chief Commissioner of Oude. On 24 May 1866, he was appointed Knight Commander of the Order of the Star of India.

A Liberal, Wingfield was elected to Parliament over Bedford Pim, serving served during the period of 18 November 1868 to 5 February 1874 when Wingfield was unseated by Pim.

== Personal life ==
Wingfield never married. His residence was located first at 12 Albert Mansions, Victoria Street, London, and at the time of his death on 27 January 1892 at 66 Portland Place, London.

In his will (proved on 4 March 1892), Wingfield bequeathed money to at least two charities, including the London and the National Dental Hospitals.

== Legacy ==
The 80-acre (320,000 m^{2}) Wingfield Park, named in his honour, is half a mile south of Sikandar Bagh in Lucknow, Uttar Pradesh, India.

Parliament of the United Kingdom
New constituency	Member of Parliament for Gravesend; 1868–1874	Succeeded by Bedford Pim
