= James Dampier Palmer =

British politician (1851–1899)

Colonel James Dampier Palmer MP

Member of Parliament for Gravesend
- In office 8 July 1892 – 2 July 1898
- Preceded by: John Bazley White
- Succeeded by: John Ryder

Personal details
- Born: 6 September 1851 Stratford, Essex, England
- Died: 18 October 1899 (aged 48) Brighton, England
- Party: Conservative
- Spouse: Isabella Elizabeth Curteis Whelan
- Education: Felsted School
- Profession: Chairman, Messrs. Palmer & Co.

Colonel James Dampier Palmer MP (6 September 1851 – 18 October 1899), was an English businessman, British Army officer, and a Progressive-Conservative politician.

== Early years ==
Palmer's father was William Palmer of Bury House, Romford, Essex and his mother was Jane Michel Trestrail. He was educated at Felsted School.

== Career ==
Palmer worked in the banking firm and family business of Messrs. Palmer & Co., in Stratford and became its Chairman. He was also a Director of Hatch, Mansfield & Co., Ltd. of London, S.W. Palmer was a Justice of the peace for Kent and West Ham. During his political career, he served as a Member of Parliament for Gravesend on 8 July 1892 – 2 July 1898, leaving his seat in Parliament before the end of his second term as he had accepted the Stewardship of the three Chiltern Hundreds. As a result, a by-election was held 13 July 1898. He also served in the Volunteer Forces of the British Army. He was first commissioned as a supernumerary sub-lieutenant in the 5th Essex Rifle Volunteer Corps on 2 August 1876, and resigned that commission on 5 September 1877. He was later appointed Honorary Colonel of the 3rd Volunteer (Kent) Brigade, Cinque Ports Division, Royal Artillery.

== Personal life ==
He married Isabella Elizabeth Curteis Whelan (b. 20 November 1852) in 1874. Elizabeth's maternal grandfather was James Planché, a British dramatist, antiquary and officer of arms. Palmer and his wife had at least two children. Their only son was Vivian Trestrail Dampier Palmer, O.B.E. (b. 1876). A daughter was named Maud Isabel Dampier; she married William John Wisden in 1900.

In 1891, when prospective Member of Parliament for Gravesend, Palmer presented the Dampier-Palmer Cup which was competed for by local football clubs, until 2009, to raise money for local charities.

Palmer had multiple residences including 7 Park Place, St. James, S.W.; 31 Bruswick Terrace, Brighton; and Heronden Hall, Tenterden, Kent. He belonged to several clubs such as the Carlton Club, Junior Carlton Club, Bath Club, and Coaching Club.

He died at age 48 at Brighton on 16 October 1899. A brass plate commemorating Palmer's donations to the parish, including chancel screen, choir seats, choir screens, the lectern, and the pulpit, is located at the Parish Church of St. Mildred in Tenterden.

Parliament of the United Kingdom
Preceded by John Bazley White	Member of Parliament for Gravesend; 1892 − 1898	Succeeded by John Ryder
