= John Ovenden =

British politician (1942–2018)

John Frederick Ovenden (17 August 1942 – 17 July 2018) was a British Labour Party politician.

Born in Kent, Ovenden was educated at the Chatham House Grammar School in Ramsgate. From 1961 until 1974, he worked as an engineer with the Post Office. He joined the Labour Party, and served on Gillingham Council from 1966 to 1969, and again from 1972 to 1974.

Having contested Sevenoaks in 1970, Ovenden was elected as Member of Parliament for the marginal seat of Gravesend between 1974 and 1979, when he lost to the Conservative Timothy Brinton. He served on Kent County Council from 1985 to 2001, and was leader of the Labour Group and co-leader of the Council (in a Labour/Lib Dem alliance) from 1994 to 1997, the first period of non-Conservative control in the Council's history.

Parliament of the United Kingdom
Preceded by Roger White	Member of Parliament for Gravesend; February 1974 – 1979	Succeeded by Tim Brinton
Preceded by Brenda Trench	Leader of Kent County Council; 1993–1997	Succeeded by Sandy Bruce-Lockhart
