= 1918 Gravesend by-election =

UK parliamentary by-election

The 1918 Gravesend by-election was a Parliamentary by-election held on 7 June 1918. The constituency returned one Member of Parliament (MP) to the House of Commons of the United Kingdom, elected by the first past the post voting system.

== Vacancy ==
Sir Gilbert Parker had been Conservative MP for the seat of Gravesend since the 1900 general elections. In 1918, Parker resigned his seat.

== Electoral history ==
Parker had encountered few problems in holding the seat for the Conservatives, even in the Liberal landslide year of 1906. At the previous general election in 1910, Parker had a comfortable majority.

General election December 1910: Gravesend
Party	Candidate	Votes	%	±%
Conservative	Gilbert Parker	3,108	55.4	−0.3
Liberal	Samuel Roberts Jenkins	2,506	44.6	+0.3
Majority		602	10.8	−0.6
Turnout		5,614	83.4	−4.2
Conservative hold		Swing	-0.3	

== Candidates ==
Alexander Richardson was chosen to defend the seat for both the Unionist Party and the Coalition Government. He was a 54 year old engineering journalist and editor. He was standing for parliament for the first time. Due to the war-time electoral truce, he faced no opposition from either the Liberal Party or the Labour Patty. He faced two opponents, Alderman Henry Edward Davis running as an Independent Unionist and Harry Hinkley running as an Independent Labour candidate. Alderman Davis also supported the Coalition Government.

== Campaign ==
Polling Day was fixed for 7 June 1918.

== Result ==
The Unionists held the seat with a reduced share of the vote.

1918 Gravesend by-election
Party	Candidate	Votes	%	±%
Unionist	Alexander Richardson	1,312	44.0	−11.4
Ind. Unionist	Henry Edward Davis	1,106	37.1	New
Independent Labour	Harry Hinkley	562	18.9	New
Majority		206	6.9	−3.9
Turnout		2,980	36.6	−46.8
Unionist hold		Swing		

== Aftermath ==
At the general election later that year, Richardson was again endorsed by the Coalition Government. He again faced Davis and Hinkley. Hinkley this time being endorsed by the right-wing National Party. The Labour and Liberal parties also ran candidates, splitting the ant-coalition government vote and Richardson thus won easily.

General election 1918: Gravesend
Party		Candidate	Votes	%	±%
C	Unionist	Alexander Richardson	7,841	51.6	−3.8
	Labour	James Butts	3,254	21.5	New
	Ind. Unionist	Henry Edward Davis	1,817	12.0	New
	Liberal	Charles Edward Best	1,271	8.4	−36.2
	National	Harry Hinkley	985	6.5	New
Majority			4,587	30.1	+19.3
Turnout			15,168	48.8	−34.6
Registered electors			31,070		
	Unionist hold		Swing	+21.6	
C indicates candidate endorsed by the coalition government.
