= Henry Ryder, 4th Earl of Harrowby =

British peer

Henry Dudley Ryder, 4th Earl of Harrowby (3 May 1836 – 11 December 1900), was a British hereditary peer.

== Early life and education ==
Harrowby was the younger son of Dudley Ryder, 2nd Earl of Harrowby and his wife Frances Stuart, fourth daughter of John Stuart, 1st Marquess of Bute. He was educated at Harrow School and at Christ Church, Oxford.

== Later life ==
Harrowby became a senior partner at Coutts & Co. He held the offices of Deputy Lieutenant (DL) and Justice of the Peace (JP).

He succeeded his elder brother Dudley Ryder, 3rd Earl of Harrowby in the earldom and subsidiary titles on 26 March 1900.

== Marriage and children ==
Lord Harrowby married Susan Juliana Maria Hamilton Dent, only daughter of John Villiers Dent and his wife, Susan Orde, on 17 May 1859. They had eight children:

- Lady Margaret Susan Ryder (11 September 1860 - 17 September 1932)
- Lady Angela Mary Alice Ryder (1 March 1863 - 10 November 1939) who married Colin Campbell, 1st Baron Colgrain
- John Herbert Dudley Ryder, 5th Earl of Harrowby (22 August 1864 - 30 March 1956)
- Hon Archibald Dudley Ryder (26 July 1867 - 19 January 1950)
- Hon Edward Alan Dudley Ryder (22 October 1869 - 4 April 1949)
- Lady Constance Susan Euphemia Ryder (4 April 1871 - 24 February 1950)
- Lady Adelaide Audrey Ryder (19 November 1875 - 23 December 1956)
- Major Hon Robert Nathaniel Dudley Ryder (7 December 1882 - 30 November 1917), killed in action at the Battle of Passchendaele, also known as the Third Battle of Ypres.

== Death ==
Lord Harrowby died on 11 December 1900 on his yacht Miranda off Algiers and was buried at Sandon. He was succeeded in the earldom and other titles by eldest his son, John.

Peerage of the United Kingdom
| Preceded by Dudley Francis Stuart Ryder | Earl of Harrowby; March–December 1900 | Succeeded by John Herbert Dudley Ryder |
