= Garry Allighan =

British journalist and politician

Member of Parliament for Gravesend
- In office 5 July 1945 – 30 October 1947
- Preceded by: Sir Irving Albery
- Succeeded by: Richard Acland

Personal details
- Born: Ernest George Alligan; 16 February 1895
- Died: 17 August 1977 (aged 82) Johannesburg, South Africa
- Party: Labour (until 1947); Independent (from 1947)
- Occupation: Journalist and author

Ernest George Allighan (16 February 1895 – 17 August 1977) was a British journalist and Labour Party Member of Parliament (MP).

== Background ==
He was born with the surname Alligan and added the 'h' because he believed that it would make it seem more Irish (even though 'Alligan' is the original Irish spelling and he himself was of Irish descent).

== Parliamentary career ==
A former writer for the Daily Mirror, at the 1945 general election he was elected to Parliament for the constituency of Gravesend in Kent.

In 1947, he wrote an article for the World's Press News alleging that members of parliament gave information to the newspapers about private parliamentary party meetings, often in return for money, publicity or free drinks. The allegation, which was considered a grave infringement of parliamentary privilege, was investigated by the Committee of Privileges, who decided there was no evidence to support them. The only exception was the case of Allighan himself and another Labour member, who were found to have sold such information to the London Evening Standard.

The other member, Evelyn Walkden, admitted the offence and since he had paid taxes on the money, was permitted to remain as an MP. Allighan was charged with "aggravated contempt and gross breach of privilege" and expelled from the House of Commons on 30 October 1947. In the debate, the Leader of the House, Herbert Morrison, proposed six months' suspension but it was argued that this would deprive his constituents of representation for too long a period. It was also observed that after expulsion he was free to seek re-election if he believed he had been treated unfairly and, if returned, could resume his seat. However, he chose not to do this and immediately resigned from the Labour Party. He appears to have been the only MP since Charles Bradlaugh in the 19th century, and definitively the only one since 1945, to have been expelled from the Commons by motion of the House other than for a serious criminal offence or bankruptcy.

At the resulting Gravesend by-election, Richard Acland held the seat for Labour, with a reduced majority.

== Later life ==
After the affair, he moved to South Africa, where he became principal of the Premier School of Journalism in Johannesburg. He wrote a number of well-received books on the politics of South Africa and Rhodesia. In 1961 he published the controversial Four Bonnets to Golgotha, a book about four members of the Booth family: Catherine, Florence, Evangeline Booth and Catherine Bramwell-Booth.

He died in Johannesburg on 17 August 1977.

== Publications ==
- The Romance of the Talkies (London: Claude Stacey, 1929)
- Sir John Reith (London: Stanley Paul & Co, 1939)
- Curtain-Up On South Africa: Presenting a National Drama (London: Boardman, 1960)
- Four Bonnets to Golgotha (London: Macdonald, 1961)
- Verwoerd, The End (London: Boardman; Cape Town, Johannesburg: Purnell & Sons, 1961)
- The Welensky Story (London: Macdonald; Cape Town, Johannesburg: Purnell & Sons, 1962)
- The 65th Defendant: An Exposure of Gangster Crime and a Social Indictment (London and Cape Town: Bailey & Swinfen, 1963)

Parliament of the United Kingdom
Preceded by Sir Irving Albery	Member of Parliament for Gravesend; 1945–1947	Succeeded by Richard Acland
