= Albert Murray, Baron Murray of Gravesend =

British Labour Party politician

The Right Honourable The Lord Murray of Gravesend

Parliamentary Secretary to the Ministry of Transport
- In office 13 October 1969 – 19 June 1970
- Prime Minister: Harold Wilson
- Preceded by: Robert Brown
- Succeeded by: Michael Heseltine

Member of the House of Lords; Lord Temporal
- In office 28 June 1976 – 10 February 1980

Member of Parliament for Gravesend
- In office 15 October 1964 – 29 May 1970
- Preceded by: Peter Kirk
- Succeeded by: Roger White

Personal details
- Born: Albert James Murray; 9 January 1930
- Died: 10 February 1980 (aged 50)
- Party: Labour

Albert James Murray, Baron Murray of Gravesend (9 January 1930 – 10 February 1980) was a British Labour Party politician.

Murray represented Dulwich on London County Council from 1958 until the council's abolition, in 1965. At the 1964 general election, he was elected as Member of Parliament (MP) for Gravesend in Kent, a marginal seat which was normally won by the party forming the government. Indeed, Murray held the seat until it was regained by the Conservatives in 1970, the year Edward Heath became prime minister.

From 1969 to 1970, he was a junior minister in Harold Wilson's government, as Parliamentary Secretary to the Ministry of Transport, under Minister of Transport Richard Marsh.

After leaving the House of Commons, Murray was given a life peerage on 28 June 1976 as Baron Murray of Gravesend, of Gravesend in the County of Kent. From 1976 to 1979 he was a Member of the European Parliament. He died in 1980, at the age of 50 whilst watching his beloved Millwall. He was also President of Gravesend & Northfleet and the North Kent Sunday Football League.
