= John Bazley White =

John Bazley White (1848 – 9 February 1927) was an English cement manufacturer and Conservative Party politician.

White was born at Balham, the son of John Bazley White and his wife Mary. His father was a cement maker, who had pioneered the use of portland cement and acquired the cement making plant at Swanscombe, established by James Frost. White himself joined the firm of John Bazley White & sons.

In 1885 White was elected as the Member of Parliament (MP) for Gravesend. He held the seat until 1892. In 1889-90 he is noted as living at 21 Princes Gate.

White died at the age of 78.

White married Grace Leslie, a descendant of the Earl of Rothes, on 10 April 1876.

Parliament of the United Kingdom
Preceded by Sydney Waterlow	Member of Parliament for Gravesend; 1885 – 1892	Succeeded by James Dampier Palmer
