= Alexander Richardson (MP) =

British politician

Sir Alexander Richardson (27 March 1864 – 30 March 1928) was Conservative MP for Gravesend.

Before becoming an MP, he was a journalist and editor who specialised in engineering subjects. He was a long-time editor of Engineering magazine. He also wrote numerous historical works about engineering and engineering firm histories.

He was first elected at a by-election in 1918 during the war, was re-elected in the general elections of 1918 and 1922, but lost the seat to Labour in 1923. He was knighted in the 1922 New Year Honours.

== Sources ==
Parliament of the United Kingdom
Preceded by Sir Gilbert Parker	Member of Parliament for Gravesend; 1918–1923	Succeeded by George Isaacs
