= 1939 Southwark North by-election =

UK parliamentary by-election

- 19 May 1939

Constituency of Southwark North
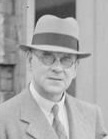
	First party	Second party
		LNP
Candidate	George Isaacs	A. H. Henderson-Livesey
Party	Labour	Liberal National
Popular vote	5,815	4,322
Percentage	57.4%	42.6%
Swing	▲7.6%	▼7.6%
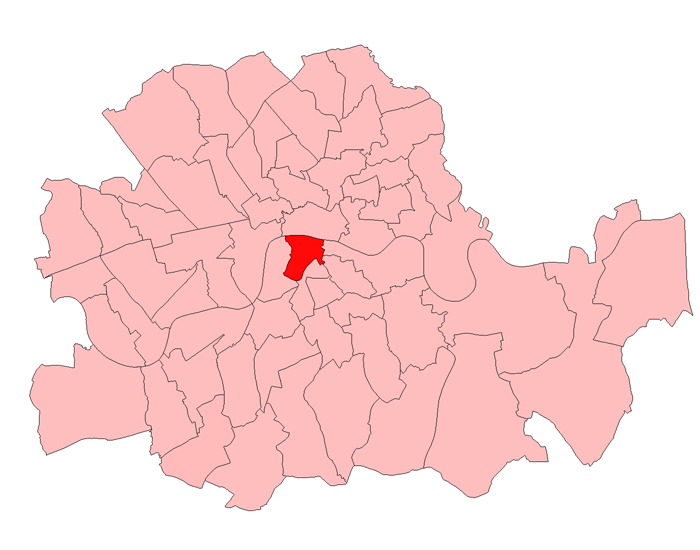
- A map of parliamentary constituencies within the County of London at the time of the by-election, with Southwark North highlighted in red.
MP before election
Edward Strauss
Liberal National
Elected MP
George Isaacs
Labour

The 1939 Southwark North by-election of 19 May 1939 was a parliamentary by-election held on 19 May 1939 for the British House of Commons constituency of Southwark North. The Labour Party gained the seat from the Liberal National Party.

== Previous result ==
1935 United Kingdom general election: Southwark North
Party	Candidate	Votes	%	±%
Liberal National	Edward Strauss	8,086	50.2	−14.7
Labour	George Isaacs	8,007	49.8	+14.7
Majority		79	0.4	N/A
Turnout		16,093	56.1	−7.1
Liberal National hold		Swing		

== Result ==
Southwark North by-election, 1939
Party	Candidate	Votes	%	±%
Labour	George Isaacs	5,815	57.4	+7.6
Liberal National	A.H. Henderson-Livesey	4,322	42.6	−7.6
Majority		1,493	14.8	N/A
Turnout		10,137	38.9	−17.2
Labour gain from Liberal National		Swing	+7.6	

== Aftermath ==
In the 1945 general election,

1945 United Kingdom general election: Southwark North
Party	Candidate	Votes	%	±%
Labour	George Isaacs	5,943	69.0	+11.6
Liberal National	Edward Terrell	2,673	31.0	−11.6
Majority		3,270	38.0	+23.2
Turnout		8,616	61.3	+22.4
Labour hold		Swing		
