= Roger White (politician) =

Roger Lowrey White (1 June 1928 – 16 February 2000) was a British Conservative Party politician and company director.

At the 1970 general election, he was elected as Member of Parliament (MP) for Gravesend in Kent, a marginal seat which traditionally was won by the party in power (the 1970 general election resulted in a surprise victory for the Conservatives). At the general election in February 1974, which resulted in a hung parliament, White lost to the Labour candidate John Ovenden.

White was a member of the right-wing Conservative Monday Club.

Roger Lowrey White was born in South London. His father, George Frederick White was a former trooper in the Blues & Royals, Household Cavalry, who went on to become an Inspector in the Metropolitan Police and a Board of Trade official. His mother was Dorothy Jeanette nee Lowrey - from the famous Lowrey family who had owned music halls in Ireland and the north of England. She had already lost two children in childbirth, and Roger had to battle and overcome various illnesses throughout his childhood. He had a younger sister Heather Louie White.

Roger was keen to serve in the RAF - however medical issues ended his career before it took off. He retained a life-time love for the RAF. Thwarted on this front, he channelled his energy into political activity in the Young Conservatives at a local and national level. He contested elections for the Conservatives in Stoke Newington and Orpington constituencies before his eventual election as MP for Gravesend. (see above).

Marriage: He married Angela Orman in Bromley, Kent in January 1962. Angela was a fellow Conservative member and activist who went on to serve as a county councillor for many years.

Post-Westminster Activities: Despite his disappointment at only being able to serve one term in Parliament, Roger remained active in public service. He was a senior magistrate (JP) on the bench at the historic City of Westminster Magistrates' Court, Horseferry Road. He was active in the Masonic Movement at a local and a national level. He had commercial interests in the tea business in the Far East. His striking head of white hair proved an advantage in those cultures where seniority is revered.

Retirement: He retired to Huntingdon and typically of his sense of humour lived in a property called The White House. He enjoyed a rich social life with friends from RAF Brampton and Brampton Golf Club.

Death: He died on 16 February 2000 in Huntingdon. A funeral service was held in the local parish church. A memorial service was held subsequently at St Margaret's Church, Westminster (adjacent to Westminster Abbey). Generous tributes were paid. Former Prime Minister, Sir John Major KG CH read one of the Bible readings. Roger's ashes were interred in the churchyard of St Giles, Stoke Poges (of Thomas Gray's "Elegy written in a country churchyard" fame) alongside his mother and other family members.

Parliament of the United Kingdom
Preceded by Albert Murray	Member of Parliament for Gravesend; 1970–February 1974	Succeeded by John Ovenden
