= 1947 Gravesend by-election =

UK Parliamentary by-election

The 1947 Gravesend by-election was a by-election held on 26 November 1947 to fill the vacant British House of Commons seat of Gravesend. The vacancy arose when the sitting Member of Parliament (MP), Garry Allighan, was expelled from the House for making allegations of corruption.

The seat was considered a marginal, having been won at the 1945 general election from the Conservatives, who had held it since the 1924 general election.

== Candidates ==
Labour selected as its candidate Sir Richard Acland, a baronet and former Liberal MP for Barnstaple. He had left the Liberal Party in 1942 to found the socialist Common Wealth Party, which polled well in war-time by-elections, but won only one seat at the 1945 general election. After his own defeat in Putney, where he came third with only 8% of the votes, Acland had joined Labour.

The Conservative Party candidate was Frank K. Taylor. The Liberals, who had polled only 12% of the vote in 1945, did not contest the election.

== Result ==
Labour, who had not lost a seat at a by-election since the general election, had done badly in the recent local elections and were concerned that the unpopularity of their economic policies might cause a loss of the seat. Although their majority was slashed from 7,056 to 1,675 they were satisfied with the result.

1947 Gravesend by-election
| Party | Candidate | Votes | % | ±% |
|---|---|---|---|---|
| Labour | Richard Acland | 24,692 | 51.8 | −0.7 |
| Conservative | Frank K. Taylor | 23,017 | 48.2 | +12.9 |
| Majority | | 1,675 | 3.6 | −13.6 |
| Turnout | | 47,709 | | |
| Labour hold | | Swing | −6.1 | |
