= Sir John Dyke Acland, 16th Baronet =

British baronet (1939–2009)

Sir John Dyke Acland, 16th Baronet (13 May 1939 – 26 September 2009) was the eldest son of Sir Richard Acland, 15th Baronet and Anne Stella Alford.

John Acland attended the Dragon School in Oxford, Clifton College, Magdalene College, Cambridge, and the University of Wisconsin.

Acland married Virginia Forge, daughter of Roland Forge, on 9 September 1961. His children were Dominic Dyke Acland (born 1962), Dr Piers Dyke Acland (born 1965), and Holly Dyke Acland (born 1972). He succeeded his father as baronet on the latter's death on 24 November 1990.

Acland died on 26 September 2009 a day after being involved in a car accident near Bedford, England.

== Sources ==
- Acland, Sir John (Dyke), Who's Who 2008, A & C Black, 2008; online edition, Oxford University Press, December 2007.
- Burke's Peerage, Baronetage & Knightage, 107th Edition, edited by Charles Mosley, Wilmington, Delaware, 2003, vol I, pp. 28–31., ISBN 0-9711966-2-1.

Baronetage of England
| Preceded by Richard Acland | Baronet (of Columb John); 1990–2009 | Succeeded by Dominic Dyke Acland |
