= Southwark North =

Parliamentary constituency in the United Kingdom, 1918–1950

- Former borough constituency for the House of Commons

1918–1950
- Seats: one
- Created from: Southwark West
- Replaced by: Southwark

Southwark (Br [ˈsʌðɨk]) North was a parliamentary constituency in the Metropolitan Borough of Southwark, in South London. It returned one Member of Parliament (MP) to the House of Commons of the Parliament of the United Kingdom.

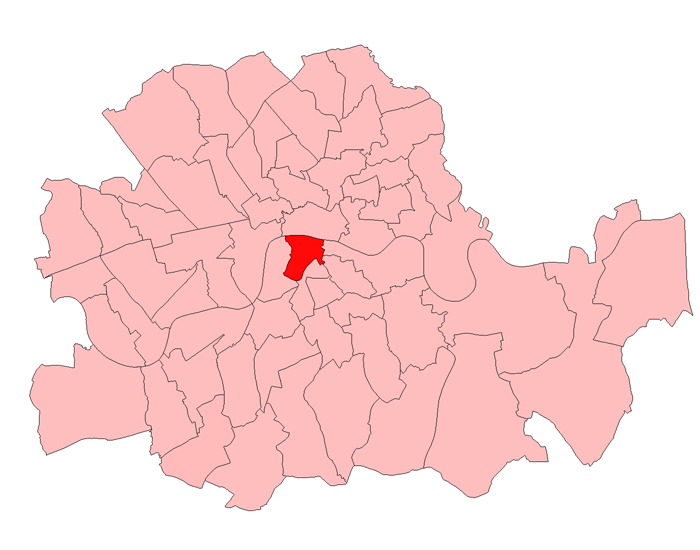
Southwark North in the Parliamentary County of London, 1918–50

== History ==
The constituency was created for the 1918 general election, and abolished for the 1950 general election, when it was largely replaced by the new Southwark constituency.

== Boundaries ==
A map showing the wards of Southwark Metropolitan Borough as they appeared in 1916.

The constituency comprised the Metropolitan Borough of Southwark wards of Christchurch, St. Jude, St. Michael and St. Saviour. It covered almost all of Cathedrals ward and the northern part of the Chaucer ward in the modern day London Borough of Southwark.

== Members of Parliament ==
Election	Member	Party
1918	Edward Strauss	Coalition Liberal
1922	Edward Strauss	National Liberal
Nov 1923	Edward Strauss	Liberal
Dec 1923	Leslie Haden-Guest	Labour
1927 by-election	Edward Strauss	Liberal
1929	George Isaacs	Labour
1931	Edward Strauss	National Liberal
1939 by-election	George Isaacs	Labour
1950	constituency abolished: see Southwark	

== Election results ==
=== Election in the 1910s ===
Edward Strauss

General election 1918: Southwark North
Party		Candidate	Votes	%
C	National Liberal	Edward Strauss	4,254	47.1
	Ind. Unionist	John Harrington	2,183	24.2
	Labour	George Isaacs	2,027	22.4
	NFDDSS	George Gregory Gebbett	573	6.3
Majority			2,071	22.9
Turnout			9,037	40.4
	National Liberal win (new seat)			
C indicates candidate endorsed by the coalition government.

=== Election in the 1920s ===
General election 1922: Southwark North
Party	Candidate	Votes	%	±%
National Liberal	Edward Strauss	7,435	54.0	+6.9
Labour	Leslie Haden-Guest	6,323	46.0	+23.6
Majority		1,112	8.0	−14.9
Turnout		13,758	56.1	+15.7
National Liberal hold		Swing		

General election 1923: Southwark North
Party	Candidate	Votes	%	±%
Labour	Leslie Haden-Guest	7,665	51.2	+5.2
Liberal	Edward Strauss	7,303	48.8	−5.2
Majority		362	2.4	N/A
Turnout		14,968	59.7	+3.6
Labour gain from Liberal		Swing	+5.2	

General election 1924: Southwark North
Party	Candidate	Votes	%	±%
Labour	Leslie Haden-Guest	8,115	43.8	−7.4
Liberal	Edward Strauss	7,085	38.3	−10.5
Unionist	John Llewellin	3,305	17.9	New
Majority		1,030	5.5	+3.1
Turnout		18,505	71.5	+11.8
Labour hold		Swing		

1927 Southwark North by-election
Party	Candidate	Votes	%	±%
Liberal	Edward Strauss	7,334	43.9	+5.6
Labour	George Isaacs	6,167	36.9	−6.9
Constitutionalist (Conservative)	Leslie Haden-Guest	3,215	19.2	New
Majority		1,167	7.0	N/A
Turnout		16,716	62.8	−8.7
Liberal gain from Labour		Swing	+6.3	

General election 1929: Southwark North
Party	Candidate	Votes	%	±%
Labour	George Isaacs	9,660	45.8	+2.0
Liberal	Edward Strauss	9,228	43.8	+5.5
Unionist	Marcus Samuel	2,198	10.4	−7.5
Majority		432	2.0	N/A
Turnout		21,086	65.2	−6.3
Labour gain from Liberal		Swing	+4.5	

=== Election in the 1930s ===
General election 1931: Southwark North
Party	Candidate	Votes	%	±%
Liberal	*Edward Strauss	13,045	64.9	+21.1
Labour	George Isaacs	7,053	35.1	−13.7
Majority		5,992	29.8	N/A
Turnout		20,098	63.2	−2.0
Liberal gain from Labour		Swing	+15.9	

- After the election, Strauss took the Liberal National whip.

General election 1935: Southwark North
Party	Candidate	Votes	%	±%
National Liberal	Edward Strauss	8,086	50.2	−14.7
Labour	George Isaacs	8,007	49.8	+14.7
Majority		79	0.4	N/A
Turnout		16,093	56.1	−7.1
National Liberal hold		Swing		

1939 Southwark North by-election
Party	Candidate	Votes	%	±%
Labour	George Isaacs	5,815	57.4	+7.6
National Liberal	Alfred Henderson-Livesey	4,322	42.6	−7.6
Majority		1,493	14.8	N/A
Turnout		10,137	38.9	−17.2
Labour gain from National Liberal		Swing	+7.6	

=== Election in the 1940s ===
General election 1945: Southwark North
Party	Candidate	Votes	%	±%
Labour	George Isaacs	5,943	69.0	+19.2
National Liberal	Edward Terrell	2,673	31.0	−19.2
Majority		3,270	38.0	+37.6
Turnout		8,616	61.3	+5.2
Labour hold		Swing		
