= Richard Acland =

English politician, a founder of the British Common Wealth Party

Sir Richard Acland, Bt

Member of Parliament for Gravesend
- In office 26 November 1947 – 6 May 1955
- Preceded by: Garry Allighan
- Succeeded by: Peter Kirk

Member of Parliament for Barnstaple
- In office 14 November 1935 – 15 June 1945
- Preceded by: Basil Peto
- Succeeded by: Christopher Peto

Personal details
- Born: 26 November 1906 Broadclyst, Devon, England
- Died: 24 November 1990 (aged 83) Exeter, Devon, England
- Party: Independent (from 1955); Labour (1945–1955); Common Wealth (1942–1945); Liberal (until 1942)
- Other political affiliations: Popular Front
- Spouse: Anne Stella Alford (m. 1936)
- Parents: Francis Acland (father); Eleanor Acland (mother)
- Education: Rugby School
- Alma mater: Balliol College, Oxford

Sir Richard Thomas Dyke Acland, 15th Baronet (26 November 1906 – 24 November 1990) was one of the founding members of the British Common Wealth Party in 1942, having previously been a Liberal Member of Parliament (MP). He joined the Labour Party in 1945 and was later a Labour MP. He was one of the founders of the Campaign for Nuclear Disarmament (CND).

== First years ==
Richard Thomas Dyke Acland was born on 26 November 1906 at Broadclyst, Devon, the eldest son of Sir Francis Dyke Acland (1874–1939), 14th Baronet, a Liberal Member of Parliament (MP) and of his first wife Eleanor Acland, née Cropper (1878–1933), a Liberal politician, suffragist, and novelist. He had two brothers and one sister; his brother Geoffrey Acland also became a Liberal politician.

He was educated at Rugby School and at Balliol College, Oxford, before qualifying as a barrister (admitted at the Inner Temple in 1930). He briefly served in peacetime as a lieutenant in the 96th (Royal Devon Yeomanry) Field Brigade, RA.

Acland stood unsuccessfully for Parliament as the Liberal candidate for Torquay at the 1929 general election. He was elected Liberal MP for Barnstaple at the 1935 election, having first contested the seat in the 1931 general election. He was a junior whip for the Liberals. He helped launch the Popular Front in December 1936. His politics changed course subsequently, as seen in the various political pamphlets he wrote.

On 15 April 1936, he married Anne Stella Alford, an architect; together they had four sons, including John Dyke Acland and Robert D. Acland.

He succeeded his father as baronet in 1939.

== Common Wealth Party ==
In 1942, Acland broke from the Liberals to found the socialist Common Wealth Party with J. B. Priestley and Tom Wintringham, opposing the coalition between the major parties. During the Second World War, the new party showed signs of a breakthrough, especially in London and Merseyside, winning three by-elections. However, the 1945 general election was a severe disappointment. Only one Member of Parliament, Ernest Millington, was elected, and other figures left, some joining the Labour Party. Acland himself failed to win Putney, where he came third.

== Labour MP ==
Acland joined Labour and was selected to fight the Gravesend seat following the expulsion of the Labour member of parliament Garry Allighan from the party for making allegations of corruption. He won the Gravesend by-election of November 1947 with a majority of 1,675.

Back in Parliament, Acland served as Second Church Estates Commissioner 1950–51. In 1955, he resigned from Labour in protest against the party's support for the Conservative government's nuclear defence policy, and lost Gravesend standing as an independent the same year, allowing the Conservatives to take the seat, denying it to the new Labour candidate, Victor Mishcon.

== Later career ==
As an advocate of public land ownership, Acland felt it impossible to reconcile his possession of the Acland estates with his politics; in 1944 he sold his West Country estates at Killerton in Devon and Holnicote in Somerset to the National Trust for £134,000 (2011 equivalent £13.5 million), partly out of principle and also to ensure their preservation intact.

This decision to relinquish the Acland property led to disagreements with his wife and the possibility of separation, but they eventually reconciled; Anne Acland, before depositing her letters, destroyed all those relating to this period of disagreement, between mid-summer 1942 and January 1943. Corresponding with the National Trust, Acland said: "I am not giving you all my property. I am keeping some of it to live on, some of it to buy a house, and some of it I am giving to Common Wealth. With what is left I pay off as much of the debts as possible [these being £21,000 death duties on his father's estate, and £11,000 accumulated debt, equivalent to circa £3 million in 2011], and then hand over the rest to you, leaving you, I regret to say, to look after what is left of the debts."

The terms of this deal were kept secret; "in widespread publicity from which the National Trust and the Aclands emerged glowing with virtue, the entire transaction was portrayed as a gift" and "the Aclands held on to... eighteenth-century family plates and dishes, portraits and landscapes, a group of family miniatures, an early nineteenth-century piano... they were able to buy a nice house in Hampstead at 66 Frognal Street; there was to be an education fund for the boys; and Common Wealth received about £65,000, allowing it to win two more by-elections."

Additionally, Acland retained some feudal rights, including the gift of the living at the parish church, and entitlement to shooting ("to be arranged as to suit the convenience of the shooting tenants") and fishing (with one rod on the Nutscale Reservoir).

Acland's sons were in later years displeased with the sale of the estates; the heir, John, left a 1994 document at Devon Record Office outlining "how he had made many requests that his mother 'should explain to me why the Killerton and Holnicote estates had been given [sic] to the National Trust in the 1940s'... John found on reading [the letters between his mother and father] that she had destroyed all the documents from the critical period at the end of 1942... His note continued: 'Anne only talked to me once, in 1989, about the gift [sic] of the estates... her principal contention was that she and Richard had been in complete agreement at every stage.' Perhaps all this secrecy, the denial of the story, was an attempt by Anne and Richard to protect themselves from the rage of their children."

Soon after leaving parliament he took a job as a maths master at Wandsworth Grammar School in Sutherland Grove, new Southfields, London, with effect from September 1955. In 1957 he helped to form the Campaign for Nuclear Disarmament (CND), and was a senior lecturer in education at St. Luke's College of Education, Exeter, between 1959 and his retirement in 1974. He became president of The Devonshire Association in 1974. Acland died in Exeter in 1990, two days before his 84th birthday.

== Writings ==
Acland's book, Unser Kampf, was published by Penguin in 1940, containing ideas inspired by a Christian-based moral view of society. It proved highly popular, going through five impressions in six months. His later works, The Forward March (1941) and How it can be done (1943) elaborated on these themes. He advocated for common ownership, citing the work of Conrad Noel as well as the Bible to support his views.

== Key publications ==
- Unser Kampf (Our Struggle). Penguin Books. 1940 – via Internet Archive.
- The Forward March. London: Allen & Unwin. 1941 – via Internet Archive.
- What It Will Be Like in the New Britain, Victor Gollancz, 1942
- How It Can Be Done, MacDonald, 1943

== Bibliography ==
- Leigh Rayment's list of baronets
- Leigh Rayment's Historical List of MPs
- The Acland Papers at the University of Exeter
- Becher, P., Becker, K. (2022). Antifaschismus, Demokratie und Gemeineigentum in Großbritannien. Richard Acland und die Vor- und Nachgeschichte des 'Spirit of '45', in Arbeit - Bewegung - Geschichte, volume xxi, no. 2, pp. 95-116.
- Nicolson, A., (2011). The Gentry, Harper Press
- Stenton, M., Lees, S. (1981). Who's Who of British Members of Parliament, volume iv (covering 1945–1979). Sussex: The Harvester Press; New Jersey: Humanities Press. ISBN 0-391-01087-5
- Neil Stockley, Richard Acland in Brack & Randall (eds.) Dictionary of Liberal Thought, Politico's 2007, pp3–5

Political offices
Preceded by J. B. Priestley	Chairman of the Common Wealth Party; 1942–1943	Succeeded by Kim Mackay
Preceded by Kim Mackay	Chairman of the Common Wealth Party; 1944–1945	Succeeded by C. A. Smith
Parliament of the United Kingdom
Preceded by Basil Peto	Member of Parliament for Barnstaple; 1935–1945	Succeeded by Christopher Peto
Preceded by Garry Allighan	Member of Parliament for Gravesend; 1947–1955	Succeeded by Peter Kirk
Baronetage of England
Preceded by Francis Dyke Acland	Baronet (of Columb John, Devonshire); 1939–1990	Succeeded by John Dyke Acland
