= George Isaacs =

British politician and trades unionist

George Isaacs JP DL
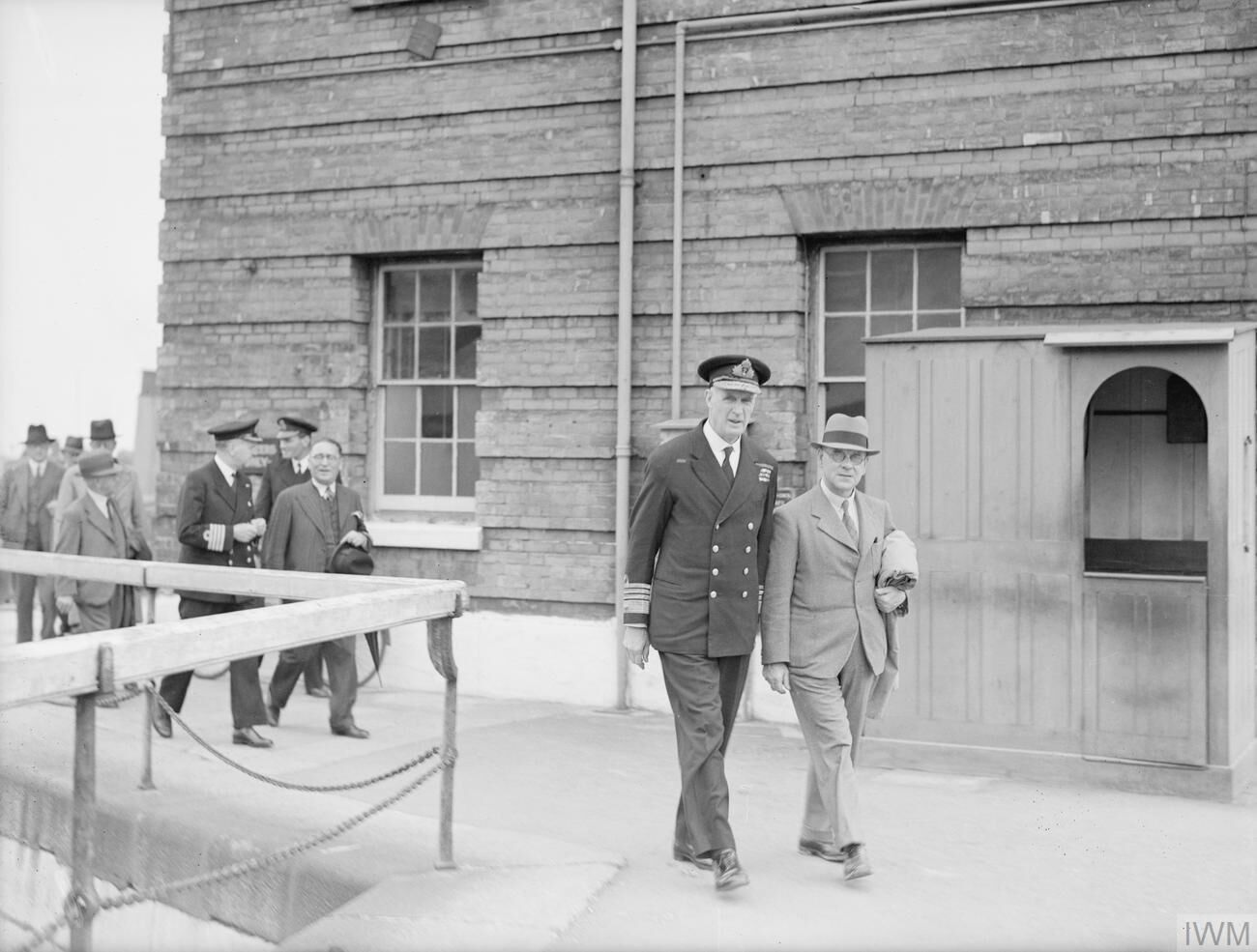
- Isaacs with Admiral Charles Little in 1943

Minister of Pensions
- In office 17 January 1951 – 5 November 1951
- Prime Minister: Clement Attlee
- Preceded by: Hilary Marquand
- Succeeded by: Derick Heathcoat-Amory

Minister of Labour and National Service
- In office 3 August 1945 – 17 January 1951
- Prime Minister: Clement Attlee
- Preceded by: Rab Butler
- Succeeded by: Aneurin Bevan

Member of Parliament for Southwark Southwark North (1929-31 and 1939–1950)
- In office 19 May 1939 – 18 September 1959
- Preceded by: Edward Anthony Strauss
- Succeeded by: Ray Gunter
- In office 30 May 1929 – 7 October 1931
- Preceded by: Edward Anthony Strauss
- Succeeded by: Edward Anthony Strauss

Member of Parliament for Gravesend
- In office 6 December 1923 – 9 October 1924
- Preceded by: Alexander Richardson
- Succeeded by: Irving Albery

Personal details
- Born: 28 May 1883 Finsbury, London
- Died: 26 April 1979 (aged 95)
- Party: Labour

George Alfred Isaacs JP DL (28 May 1883 – 26 April 1979) was a British politician and trade unionist who served in the government of Clement Attlee.

Isaacs was born in Finsbury to a Methodist family. He married Flora Beasley (1884–1962), daughter of Richard William Beasley and Mary Ann Brett, in 1905. He worked as a printer and became active in trade union organising early in life, becoming General Secretary of the National Society of Operative Printers and Assistants (NATSOPA) from 1909. This post, which he held for forty years, also took him onto the General Council of the Trades Union Congress. He was also active in the Labour Party.

He became involved in local politics in Southwark and was Mayor of the Borough of Southwark from 1919 to 1921. In the 1922 general election he fought Gravesend and was narrowly defeated; he was readopted to fight the seat in the 1923 election and won it from the Conservatives with a majority of 119. He served as Parliamentary Private Secretary to Jimmy Thomas, who was Secretary of State for the Colonies.

In the 1924 election Isaacs lost his seat, but when in 1927 the sitting Labour MP for Southwark North resigned after leaving the party, he was the natural choice to be the new candidate. However Isaacs failed to take the seat in the byelection and had to wait until the 1929 general election to return to Parliament. Thomas, now Secretary of State for Dominion Affairs, reappointed him as Parliamentary Private Secretary.

When Thomas joined Ramsay MacDonald in the National Government, Isaacs remained with the Labour Party, and in consequence again lost his seat in the 1931 general election when the Labour Party was heavily defeated. He failed by 79 votes to regain his seat in 1935. Concentrating on union affairs through the 1930s, Isaacs was appointed to a Royal Commission on Workmen's Compensation in 1938. In 1945 he was President of the World Trade Union Conference.

After the MP for Southwark North died in 1939, Isaacs was finally able to regain the seat. When Labour formed the government after the 1945 election, he was appointed Minister of Labour and National Service. In 1945, he also attended the World Trade Union Conference in London alongside many renowned trade unionists. Part of his responsibility was to oversee the successful demobilisation of the wartime British Armed Forces. Following the arrival at London of the troopship Windrush in 1948, carrying about 500 Jamaican men said to be seeking work, Isaacs stated to Members of Parliament:

"I don't know who sent these men ... it is bound to result in difficulties ... we can give no assurances that they can be found suitable work. I hope no encouragement will be given to others to follow them."

From January 1951 he was Minister of Pensions. Isaacs retired from Parliament in 1959. He had long since moved to East Molesey in Surrey where he served as a Deputy Lieutenant and as a Justice of the Peace. He was eventually Chairman of the Surrey Bench of Magistrates.

Parliament of the United Kingdom
Preceded by Alexander Richardson	Member of Parliament for Gravesend; 1923–1924	Succeeded by Sir Irving Albery
Preceded by Edward Strauss	Member of Parliament for Southwark North; 1929–1931	Succeeded by Edward Strauss
Preceded by Edward Strauss	Member of Parliament for Southwark North; 1939–1950	Constituency abolished
New constituency	Member of Parliament for Southwark; 1950–1959	Succeeded by Ray Gunter
Civic offices
Preceded by Walter Wightman	Mayor of Southwark; 1919–1921	Succeeded by George Hills
Trade union offices
Preceded by Eddie Smith	General Secretary of NATSOPA; 1909–1948	Succeeded by Harry Good
Preceded by Herbert Skinner	Printing and Paper Group representative on the General Council of the TUC; 1932 – 1945	Succeeded by E. W. Spackman
Preceded by C. W. Bowerman	President of the Printing and Kindred Trades Federation; 1939 – 1945	Succeeded by Walter C. Warren
Political offices
Preceded by Rab Butler	Minister of Labour and National Service; 1945–1951	Succeeded by Aneurin Bevan
Preceded by Hilary Marquand	Minister of Pensions; 1951	Succeeded by Derick Heathcoat-Amory
