= John Ryder, 5th Earl of Harrowby =

British hereditary peer and Member of Parliament

John Herbert Dudley Ryder, 5th Earl of Harrowby (22 August 1864 – 30 March 1956), briefly known as Viscount Sandon from March to December 1900, was a British hereditary peer and Conservative Member of Parliament.

== Early life and education ==
Harrowby was the son of Henry Ryder, 4th Earl of Harrowby and Susan Juliana Maria Hamilton Dent. He was educated at Trinity College, Cambridge.

== Career ==
In 1898 Harrowby was elected to the House of Commons for Gravesend, a seat he held until 1900 when he succeeded his father in the earldom and entered the House of Lords. From 1927 to 1948 Harrowby held the honorary post of Lord Lieutenant of Staffordshire. He worked at Coutts bank, was a Deputy Lieutenant (DL) for Staffordshire and lieutenant of the Staffordshire Yeomanry.

== Marriage and children ==
In 1887, Harrowby married Mabel Danvers Smith, daughter of William Henry Smith (of the W H Smith bookseller family) and his wife Emily Danvers Smith, 1st Viscountess Hambleden. They had four children:

- Lady Frances Ryder (7 August 1888 - 24 December 1965)
- Mary Alice Ryder (2 August 1889 - 17 September 1889)
- Dudley Ryder, 6th Earl of Harrowby (11 October 1892 - 7 May 1987)
- Alice Margaret Ryder (26 November 1898 - 18 April 1899)

Mabel, Countess of Harrowby, was appointed a Dame Commander of the Order of the British Empire (DBE) in the 1919 Birthday Honours for "services in connection with the entertainment of Officers of the Overseas Forces". She died on 27 March 1956.

== Death ==
Lord Harrowby died on 30 March 1956, only three days after his wife, at the age of 91. He was succeeded in the earldom and other titles by his only son, Dudley.

Parliament of the United Kingdom
Preceded by James Dampier Palmer	Member of Parliament for Gravesend; 1898–1900	Succeeded by Sir Gilbert Parker
Academic offices
Preceded by New institution	President of the University College of North Staffordshire; 1949–1956	Succeeded by The Princess Margaret
Honorary titles
Preceded by The Earl of Dartmouth	Lord Lieutenant of Staffordshire; 1927–1948	Succeeded by Harold Wallace-Copeland
Peerage of the United Kingdom
Preceded by Henry Dudley Ryder	Earl of Harrowby; 1900–1956	Succeeded by Dudley Ryder
