= Richard Causton, 1st Baron Southwark =

British politician

The Right Honourable The Lord Southwark PC DL

Paymaster General
- In office 12 December 1905 – 23 February 1910
- Monarchs: Edward VII; George V
- Prime Minister: Sir Henry Campbell-Bannerman; H. H. Asquith
- Preceded by: Sir Savile Crossley, Bt
- Succeeded by: Hon. Ivor Guest

Personal details
- Born: 25 September 1843 Deptford, Kent
- Died: 23 February 1929 (aged 85) 12 Devonshire Place, Marylebone, London
- Party: Liberal
- Spouse: Selina Mary Chambers

Richard Causton circa 1895

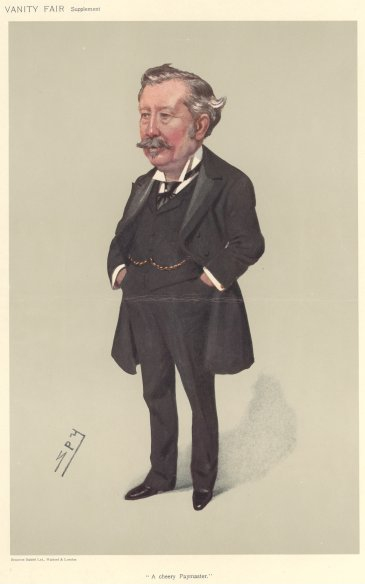
"A cheery Paymaster" Causton as caricatured by Spy (Leslie Ward) in Vanity Fair, June 1906

Richard Knight Causton, 1st Baron Southwark PC, DL (25 September 1843 – 23 February 1929) was an English stationer and Liberal politician who sat in the House of Commons in two periods between 1880 and 1910. In the same year he was raised to the peerage and sat in the House of Lords.

== Background ==
Causton was born in Deptford, Kent the son of Sir Joseph Causton alderman and sheriff of London and his wife Mary Anne Porter, daughter of Edward Porter. He was a partner in the firm of Causton and Sons, stationers and printers in Eastcheap, Southwark Street and Cary Street. He was a commissioner of lieutenancy for the City of London and a member of the Worshipful Company of Skinners of which he was master in 1877.

== Political career ==
Causton unsuccessfully contested Colchester in 1874, but was successfully returned for the constituency in 1880. However, he lost his seat in 1885 and once again stood unsuccessfully for the constituency in 1886. In 1888 he was successfully returned for Southwark West in a by-election, a seat he held until 1910. He served under William Ewart Gladstone and the Earl of Rosebery as a Junior Lord of the Treasury between 1892 and 1895 and continued as Liberal Whip until 1905. When the Liberals returned to power in December 1905 under Sir Henry Campbell-Bannerman, Causton was made Paymaster General. In January 1906 he was sworn of the Privy Council. He remained as Paymaster-General until 1910, the last two years under the premiership of H. H. Asquith. He lost his seat in parliament in 1910. The same year he was raised to the peerage as Baron Southwark, of Southwark in the County of London.

Causton was a Fellow of the Statistical Society, President of the London Chamber of Commerce in 1913 and Master of the Skinners Company again in 1921/22.

== Personal life ==
Lord Southwark died in February 1929, aged 85, his estate probated in the London Registry at £21282 12s 2d (equivalent to £1,169,000 in 2025). The barony became extinct on his death.

Causton married in 1871 Selina Mary Chambers, daughter of Sir Thomas Chambers QC, MP for Marylebone. She helped raise support for her husband's political career, sometimes addressing crowds of electors. In 1913 she published her book Social and Political Reminiscences, in which she relates her part in electioneering and reproduces her pencil sketches of their acquaintance in London society.

Parliament of the United Kingdom
Preceded by Alexander Learmonth; Herbert Mackworth-Praed	Member of Parliament for Colchester; 1880–1885; With: William Willis	Succeeded by Henry John Trotter
Preceded by Arthur Cohen	Member of Parliament for Southwark West; 1888 – Jan. 1910	Succeeded by Sir William Dunn, Bt
Political offices
Preceded by Sir Savile Crossley, Bt	Paymaster General; 1905–1910	Succeeded by Hon. Ivor Guest
Peerage of the United Kingdom
New creation	Baron Southwark; 1910–1929	Extinct
