= Gravesend (constituency) =

Former UK Parliament constituency

- Former county constituency for the House of Commons
- Gravesend in Kent, showing boundaries used from 1974-1983

1868–1983
- Seats: one
- Created from: West Kent
- Replaced by: Gravesham and Medway

Gravesend was a county constituency centred on the town of Gravesend, Kent which returned one Member of Parliament (MP) to the House of Commons of the Parliament of the United Kingdom from 1868 until it was abolished for the 1983 general election. It is most notable for being a bellwether, with the winner of Gravesend (and its successor Gravesham) winning every election from 1918 through to the present day except for 1929, 1951, and 2005.

== Boundaries ==
1868–1885: The parishes of Gravesend, Milton, and Northfleet.

1918–1950: The Borough of Gravesend, the Urban District of Northfleet, and the Rural Districts of Hoo and Strood.

1950–1955: The Borough of Gravesend, the Urban Districts of Northfleet and Swanscombe, and the Rural District of Strood.

1955–1983: The Borough of Gravesend, the Urban District of Northfleet, and the Rural District of Strood.

== Members of Parliament ==
Election	Member	Party
1868	Sir Charles John Wingfield	Liberal
1874	Bedford Pim	Conservative
1880	Thomas Bevan	Liberal
1880 by-election	Sir Sydney Waterlow	Liberal
1885	John Bazley White	Conservative
1892	James Dampier Palmer	Conservative
1898 by-election	John Ryder	Conservative
1900	Sir Gilbert Parker	Conservative
1918 by-election	Sir Alexander Richardson	Conservative
1923	George Isaacs	Labour
1924	Sir Irving Albery	Conservative
1945	Garry Allighan	Labour
1947 by-election	Sir Richard Acland	Labour
1955	Peter Kirk	Conservative
1964	Albert Murray	Labour
1970	Roger White	Conservative
Feb 1974	John Ovenden	Labour
1979	Tim Brinton	Conservative
1983	constituency abolished: see Gravesham	

== Election results ==
=== Elections in the 1860s ===
General election 1868: Gravesend
Party	Candidate	Votes	%	±%
Liberal	Charles John Wingfield	1,237	53.6	
Conservative	Bedford Pim	1,069	46.4	
Majority		168	7.2	
Turnout		2,306	84.7	
Registered electors		2,722		
Liberal win (new seat)				

=== Elections in the 1870s ===
General election 1874: Gravesend
Party	Candidate	Votes	%	±%
Conservative	Bedford Pim	1,355	54.3	+7.9
Liberal	Charles John Wingfield	1,142	45.7	−7.9
Majority		214	8.6	N/A
Turnout		2,497	87.4	+2.7
Registered electors		2,856		
Conservative gain from Liberal		Swing	+7.9	

=== Elections in the 1880s ===
General election 1880: Gravesend
Party	Candidate	Votes	%	±%
Liberal	Thomas Bevan	1,544	52.1	+6.4
Conservative	Francis Wyatt Truscott	1,422	47.9	−6.4
Majority		122	4.2	N/A
Turnout		2,966	90.3	+2.9
Registered electors		3,286		
Liberal gain from Conservative		Swing	+6.4	

The 1880 election was declared void on account of bribery, whereby Bevan had "given his men a holiday and paid them their wages".

1880 Gravesend by-election: Gravesend
Party	Candidate	Votes	%	±%
Liberal	Sydney Waterlow	1,504	53.9	+1.8
Conservative	Robert Peel	1,284	46.1	−1.8
Majority		220	7.8	+3.6
Turnout		2,788	84.8	−5.5
Registered electors		3,286		
Liberal hold		Swing	+1.8	

General election 1885: Gravesend
Party	Candidate	Votes	%	±%
Conservative	John Bazley White	1,916	50.9	+3.0
Liberal	Thomas Bevan	1,850	49.1	−3.0
Majority		66	1.8	N/A
Turnout		3,766	89.7	−0.6
Registered electors		4,200		
Conservative gain from Liberal		Swing	+3.0	

General election 1886: Gravesend
Party	Candidate	Votes	%	±%
Conservative	John Bazley White	1,938	57.5	+6.6
Liberal	Edward Smyth Pryce	1,430	42.5	−6.6
Majority		508	15.0	+13.2
Turnout		3,368	80.2	−9.5
Registered electors		4,200		
Conservative hold		Swing	+6.6	

=== Elections in the 1890s ===
Shipman

General election 1892: Gravesend
Party	Candidate	Votes	%	±%
Conservative	James Dampier Palmer	2,370	59.4	+1.9
Liberal	John Greenwood Shipman	1,619	40.6	−1.9
Majority		751	18.8	+3.8
Turnout		3,989	82.7	+2.5
Registered electors		4,821		
Conservative hold		Swing	+1.9	

Palmer

General election 1895: Gravesend
Party	Candidate	Votes	%	±%
Conservative	James Dampier Palmer	2,405	66.4	+7.0
Lib-Lab	Leslie Morton Johnson	1,218	33.6	−7.0
Majority		1,187	32.8	+14.0
Turnout		3,623	72.4	−10.3
Registered electors		5,001		
Conservative hold		Swing	+7.0	

Palmer resigned, causing a by-election.

Runciman

1898 Gravesend by-election
Party	Candidate	Votes	%	±%
Conservative	John Ryder	2,372	54.8	−11.6
Liberal	Walter Runciman	1,955	45.2	+11.6
Majority		417	9.6	−23.2
Turnout		4,327	82.0	+9.6
Registered electors		5,276		
Conservative hold		Swing	-11.6	

=== Elections in the 1900s ===
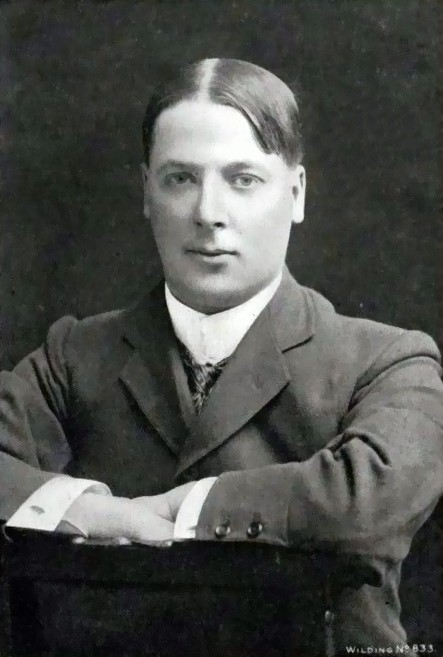
Harmsworth

General election 1900: Gravesend
Party	Candidate	Votes	%	±%
Conservative	Gilbert Parker	2,542	58.5	−7.9
Liberal	Hildebrand Harmsworth	1,804	41.5	+7.9
Majority		738	17.0	−15.8
Turnout		4,346	77.6	+5.2
Registered electors		5,600		
Conservative hold		Swing	−7.9	

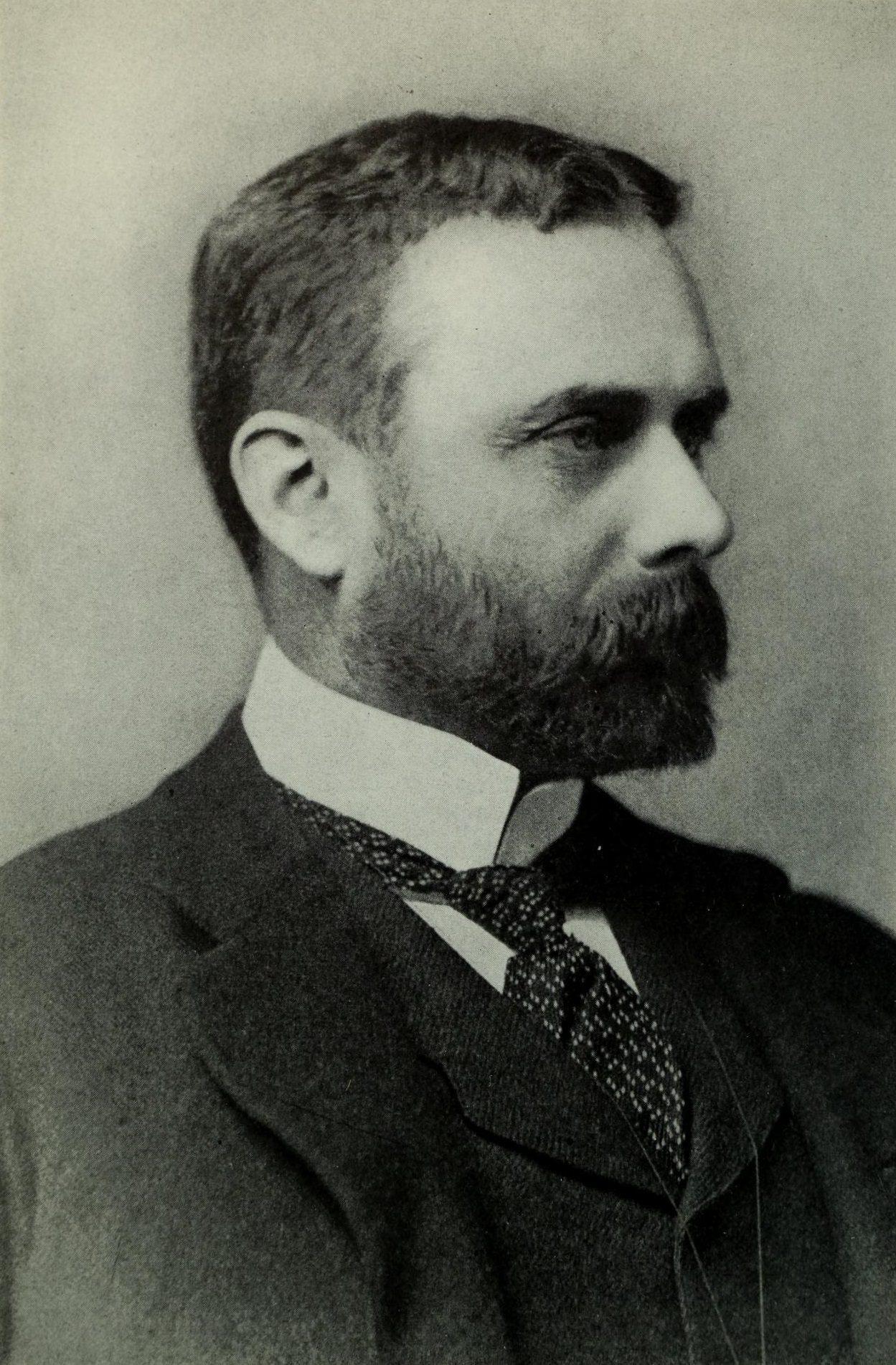
Parker

General election 1906: Gravesend
Party	Candidate	Votes	%	±%
Conservative	Gilbert Parker	3,102	57.6	−0.9
Liberal	Sir William Nevill Montgomerie Geary, 5th Baronet	1,413	26.2	−15.3
Labour Repr. Cmte.	James Macpherson	873	16.2	New
Majority		1,689	31.4	+14.4
Turnout		5,388	82.0	+4.4
Registered electors		6,568		
Conservative hold		Swing	+7.2	

=== Elections in the 1910s ===
General election January 1910: Gravesend
Party	Candidate	Votes	%	±%
Conservative	Gilbert Parker	3,286	55.7	−1.9
Liberal	Samuel Roberts Jenkins	2,612	44.3	+18.1
Majority		674	11.4	−20.0
Turnout		5,898	87.6	+5.6
Conservative hold		Swing	-10.0	

General election December 1910: Gravesend
Party	Candidate	Votes	%	±%
Conservative	Gilbert Parker	3,108	55.4	−0.3
Liberal	Samuel Roberts Jenkins	2,506	44.6	+0.3
Majority		602	10.8	−0.6
Turnout		5,614	83.4	−4.2
Conservative hold		Swing	-0.3	

General Election 1914–15:

Another General Election was required to take place before the end of 1915. The political parties had been making preparations for an election to take place and by July 1914, the following candidates had been selected;

- Unionist: Gilbert Parker
- Liberal:

1918 Gravesend by-election
Party	Candidate	Votes	%	±%
Unionist	Alexander Richardson	1,312	44.0	−11.4
Ind. Unionist	Henry Edward Davis	1,106	37.1	New
Independent Labour	Harry Hinkley	562	18.9	New
Majority		206	6.9	−3.9
Turnout		2,980	36.6	−46.8
Unionist hold		Swing		

General election 1918: Gravesend
Party		Candidate	Votes	%	±%
C	Unionist	Alexander Richardson	7,841	51.6	−3.8
	Labour	James Butts	3,254	21.5	New
	Ind. Unionist	Henry Edward Davis	1,817	12.0	N/A
	Liberal	Charles Edward Best	1,271	8.4	−36.2
	National	Harry Hinkley	985	6.5	New
Majority			4,587	30.1	+19.3
Turnout			15,168	48.8	−34.6
Registered electors			31,070		
	Unionist hold		Swing	+21.6	
C indicates candidate endorsed by the coalition government.

=== Elections in the 1920s ===
General election 1922: Gravesend
Party	Candidate	Votes	%	±%
Unionist	Alexander Richardson	8,166	40.6	−11.0
Labour	George Isaacs	7,180	35.6	+14.1
Ind. Unionist	*Henry Edward Davies	4,796	23.8	+11.8
Majority		986	5.0	−25.1
Turnout		20,142	63.0	+14.2
Registered electors		31,972		
Unionist hold		Swing	−12.6	

* Davies stood for election as an 'Anti-Waste' candidate, but was not officially supported by the Anti-Waste League

General election 1923: Gravesend
Party	Candidate	Votes	%	±%
Labour	George Isaacs	9,776	43.4	+7.8
Unionist	Alexander Richardson	9,657	42.8	+2.2
Liberal	Laurence Harry Duniam Jones	3,123	13.8	New
Majority		119	0.6	N/A
Turnout		22,556	68.8	+5.8
Registered electors		32,781		
Labour gain from Unionist		Swing	+2.9	

General election 1924: Gravesend
Party	Candidate	Votes	%	±%
Unionist	Irving Albery	15,410	58.4	+15.6
Labour	George Isaacs	10,969	41.6	−1.8
Majority		4,441	16.8	N/A
Turnout		26,379	78.0	+9.2
Registered electors		33,840		
Unionist gain from Labour		Swing	+8.7	

General election 1929: Gravesend
Party	Candidate	Votes	%	±%
Unionist	Irving Albery	14,644	46.1	−12.3
Labour	William James Humphreys	12,871	40.6	−1.0
Liberal	Frederick William Kershaw	4,220	13.3	New
Majority		1,773	5.5	−13.3
Turnout		31,735	71.8	−6.2
Registered electors		44,226		
Unionist hold		Swing	−5.7	

=== Elections in the 1930s ===
General election 1931: Gravesend
Party	Candidate	Votes	%	±%
Conservative	Irving Albery	22,410	64.2	+18.1
Labour	Ben Greene	12,488	35.8	−4.8
Majority		9,922	28.4	+22.9
Turnout		34,898	75.7	+3.9
Conservative hold		Swing	+11.5	

General election 1935: Gravesend
Party	Candidate	Votes	%	±%
Conservative	Irving Albery	20,438	56.1	−8.1
Labour	Ben Greene	15,994	43.9	+8.1
Majority		4,444	12.2	−16.2
Turnout		36,432	72.4	−3.3
Conservative hold		Swing	−8.1	

=== Elections in the 1940s ===
General election 1945: Gravesend
Party	Candidate	Votes	%	±%
Labour	Garry Allighan	21,609	52.5	+8.6
Conservative	Irving Albery	14,553	35.3	−20.8
Liberal	Reginald Edwin Goodfellow	5,033	12.2	New
Majority		7,056	17.2	N/A
Turnout		41,195	74.5	+2.1
Labour gain from Conservative		Swing	14.7	

1947 Gravesend by-election
Party	Candidate	Votes	%	±%
Labour	Richard Acland	24,692	51.8	−0.7
Conservative	Frank K. Taylor	23,017	48.2	+12.9
Majority		1,675	3.6	−13.6
Turnout		47,709		
Labour hold		Swing	−6.1	

=== Elections in the 1950s ===
General election 1950: Gravesend
Party	Candidate	Votes	%	±%
Labour	Richard Acland	28,297	53.07	
Conservative	John Gerrard Lowe	22,726	42.62	
Liberal	Mavis Doreen Ayliffe	2,298	4.31	
Majority		5,571	10.45	
Turnout		53,321	86.29	
Labour hold		Swing		

General election 1951: Gravesend
Party	Candidate	Votes	%	±%
Labour	Richard Acland	30,055	55.29	
Conservative	Charles P T Burke	24,300	44.71	
Majority		5,755	10.58	
Turnout		54,355	85.74	
Labour hold		Swing		

General election 1955: Gravesend
Party	Candidate	Votes	%	±%
Conservative	Peter Kirk	22,058	46.22	
Labour	Victor Mishcon	19,149	40.13	
Independent	Richard Acland	6,514	13.65	
Majority		2,909	6.09	N/A
Turnout		47,721	80.75	
Conservative gain from Labour		Swing		

General election 1959: Gravesend
Party	Candidate	Votes	%	±%
Conservative	Peter Kirk	27,124	52.08	+5.86
Labour	Victor Mishcon	24,962	47.92	+7.79
Majority		2,162	4.16	−1.93
Turnout		52,086	82.29	+1.54
Conservative hold		Swing	-1.0	

=== Elections in the 1960s ===
General election 1964: Gravesend
Party	Candidate	Votes	%	±%
Labour	Albert Murray	26,074	45.41	−3.81
Conservative	Peter Kirk	25,326	44.11	−7.97
Liberal	Jack Harris Barnett	6,015	10.48	New
Majority		748	1.30	N/A
Turnout		57,415	80.40	
Labour gain from Conservative		Swing	+2.1	

General election 1966: Gravesend
Party	Candidate	Votes	%	±%
Labour	Albert Murray	30,276	49.75	+4.34
Conservative	Roger White	25,484	41.88	−2.23
Liberal	Jack Harris Barnett	5,092	8.37	−2.11
Majority		4,792	7.87	+6.57
Turnout		60,852	82.04	
Labour hold		Swing	+3.3	

=== Elections in the 1970s ===
General election 1970: Gravesend
Party	Candidate	Votes	%	±%
Conservative	Roger White	29,924	46.85	+4.97
Labour	Albert Murray	28,711	44.95	−4.80
Liberal	Michael J Dunn	5,234	8.19	−0.18
Majority		1,213	1.90	N/A
Turnout		63,869	75.93	
Conservative gain from Labour		Swing	+4.9	

General election February 1974: Gravesend
Party	Candidate	Votes	%	±%
Labour	John Ovenden	29,571	40.83	
Conservative	Roger White	27,989	38.65	
Liberal	DC Mumford	13,136	18.14	
National Front	JD Turner	1,726	2.38	New
Majority		1,582	2.18	N/A
Turnout		72,422	83.73	
Labour gain from Conservative		Swing		

General election October 1974: Gravesend
Party	Candidate	Votes	%	±%
Labour	John Ovenden	29,569	43.09	
Conservative	Richard Needham	27,264	39.73	
Liberal	L Cartier	10,244	14.93	
National Front	JD Turner	1,304	1.90	
More Prosperous Britain	Tom Keen	239	0.35	New
Majority		2,305	3.36	
Turnout		68,620	78.63	
Labour hold		Swing		

General election 1979: Gravesend
Party	Candidate	Votes	%	±%
Conservative	Tim Brinton	37,592	51.95	
Labour	John Ovenden	28,246	39.04	
Liberal	Ian Goodwin	5,917	8.18	
National Front	George Willden	603	0.83	
Majority		9,346	12.91	N/A
Turnout		72,358	81.40	
Conservative gain from Labour		Swing		

== See also ==
- 1947 Gravesend by-election

== Bibliography ==
- Craig, F. W. S. (1983) [1969]. British parliamentary election results 1918-1949 (3rd ed.). Chichester: Parliamentary Research Services. ISBN 0-900178-06-X.
- Leigh Rayment's Historical List of MPs – Constituencies beginning with "G" (part 2)
