= Southwark West =

Parliamentary constituency in the United Kingdom, 1885–1918

- Former borough constituency for the House of Commons
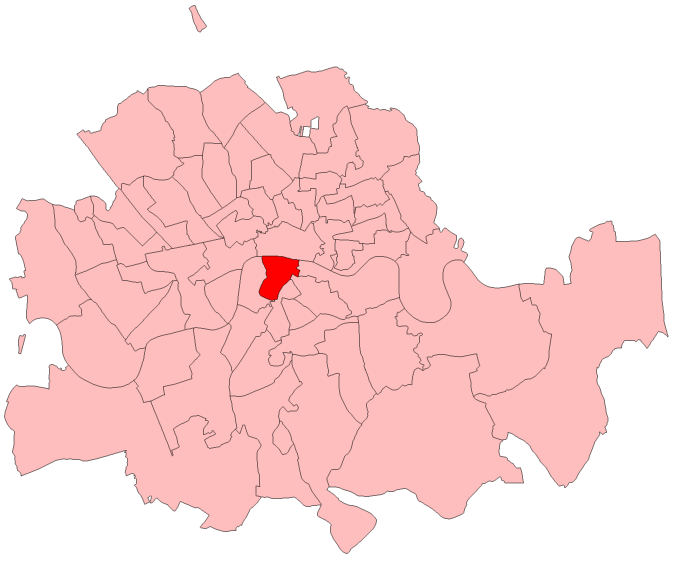
- Southwark West in London

1885–1918
- Seats: 1
- Created from: Southwark
- Replaced by: Southwark North

Southwark West was a parliamentary constituency centred on the Southwark district of South London. It returned one Member of Parliament (MP) to the House of Commons of the Parliament of the United Kingdom.

The constituency was created for the 1885 general election, and abolished for the 1918 general election.

== Members of Parliament ==
Election	Member	Party
1885	Arthur Cohen	Liberal
1888 by-election	Richard Causton	Liberal
1910	William Dunn	Conservative
1910	Edward Strauss	Liberal
1918	constituency abolished	

== Elections ==
Decades:	1880s; 1890s; 1900s; 1910s

=== Elections in the 1880s ===
General election 1885: Southwark West
Party	Candidate	Votes	%	±%
Liberal	Arthur Cohen	2,851	52.2	
Conservative	Augustus Beddall	2,611	47.8	
Majority		240	4.4	
Turnout		5,462	70.2	
Registered electors		7,776		
Liberal win (new seat)				

General election 1886: Southwark West
Party	Candidate	Votes	%	±%
Liberal	Arthur Cohen	2,566	51.1	−1.1
Conservative	Augustus Beddall	2,453	48.9	+1.1
Majority		113	2.2	−2.2
Turnout		5,019	64.5	−5.7
Registered electors		7,776		
Liberal hold		Swing	-1.1	

Cohen resigned, causing a by-election.

Causton

By-election, 17 Feb 1888: Southwark West
Party	Candidate	Votes	%	±%
Liberal	Richard Causton	3,638	59.8	+8.7
Conservative	Augustus Beddall	2,444	40.2	−8.7
Majority		1,194	19.6	+17.4
Turnout		6,082	73.3	+8.8
Registered electors		8,296		
Liberal hold		Swing	+8.7	

=== Elections in the 1890s ===
Bond

General election 1892: Southwark West
Party	Candidate	Votes	%	±%
Liberal	Richard Causton	3,534	60.6	+9.5
Conservative	Edward Bond	2,295	39.4	−9.5
Majority		1,239	21.2	+19.0
Turnout		5,829	72.4	+7.9
Registered electors		8,048		
Liberal hold		Swing	+9.5	

Causton was appointed a Lord Commissioner of the Treasury, requiring a by-election.

By-election, 23 Aug 1892: Southwark West
Party	Candidate	Votes	%	±%
Liberal	Richard Causton	Unopposed		
Liberal hold				

General election 1895: Southwark West
Party	Candidate	Votes	%	±%
Liberal	Richard Causton	2,989	51.0	−9.6
Conservative	Frederick William Horner	2,870	49.0	+9.6
Majority		119	2.0	−19.2
Turnout		5,859	72.2	−0.2
Registered electors		8,113		
Liberal hold		Swing	-9.6	

=== Elections in the 1900s ===
Causton

General election 1900: Southwark West
Party	Candidate	Votes	%	±%
Liberal	Richard Causton	2,893	51.1	+0.1
Conservative	Alfred Newton	2,763	48.9	−0.1
Majority		130	2.2	+0.2
Turnout		5,656	71.2	−1.0
Registered electors		7,945		
Liberal hold		Swing	+0.1	

General election 1906: Southwark West
Party	Candidate	Votes	%	±%
Liberal	Richard Causton	3,057	54.1	+3.0
Conservative	Arthur Salter	2,592	45.9	−3.0
Majority		465	8.2	+6.0
Turnout		5,649	79.9	+8.7
Registered electors		7,066		
Liberal hold		Swing	+3.0	

=== Elections in the 1910s ===
General election January 1910: Southwark West
Party	Candidate	Votes	%	±%
Conservative	William Dunn	3,387	51.2	+5.3
Liberal	Richard Causton	3,223	48.8	−5.3
Majority		161	2.4	N/A
Turnout		6,610		
Conservative gain from Liberal		Swing	+5.3	

Strauss

General election December 1910: Southwark West
Party	Candidate	Votes	%	±%
Liberal	Edward Strauss	3,028	50.1	+1.3
Conservative	William Dunn	3,010	49.9	−1.3
Majority		18	0.2	N/A
Turnout		6,038	74.9	
Liberal gain from Conservative		Swing	+1.3	

General Election 1914–15:

Another General Election was required to take place before the end of 1915. The political parties had been making preparations for an election to take place and by July 1914, the following candidates had been selected;

- Liberal: Edward Strauss
- Unionist:
