= Thomas Bevan (politician) =

English Liberal politician

- Born: 26 November 1829; London
- Died: 1 March 1907 (aged 77); London
- Education: City of London School
- Occupation: Cement manufacturer
- Relatives: Hannah Bevan (mother) Theodore Francis Bevan (nephew) Thomas Bevan (cricketer) (grandson)

Thomas Bevan (26 November 1829 – 1 March 1907) was an English Liberal Party politician who sat in the House of Commons briefly in 1880.

Bevan was elected member of parliament (MP) for Gravesend in the 1880 United Kingdom general election. That was election was declared void. In the subsequent by-election Sir Sydney Waterlow, 1st Baronet was elected MP.

He was elected Sheriff of London on 28 September 1878.

== Life ==
Bevan was born in London to a philanthropic Quaker family; his parents were Thomas Bevan MD FLS FLA MRCP MRCSE and Hannah Marishall Bevan.
