= Thomas Bevan (cricketer) =

English cricketer and British Army officer (1900–1942)

Personal information
- Full name: Thomas Bevan
- Born: 14 February 1900; Crayford, London, England
- Died: 12 June 1942 (aged 42); Knightsbridge Box, near Tobruk, Cyrenaica, Italian Libya
- Batting: Right-handed

Career statistics
| Competition | First-class |
|---|---|
| Matches | 1 |
| Runs scored | 7 |
| Batting average | 3.50 |
| 100s/50s | –/– |
| Top score | 6 |
| Catches/stumpings | –/– |
- Source: Cricinfo, 7 April 2019

Thomas Bevan (14 February 1900 – 12 June 1942) was an English first-class cricketer and British Army officer. Bevan was commissioned into the Coldstream Guards in December 1919 after graduating from Sandhurst. He would serve with the Coldstream Guards until his death during the Second World War, at which he commanded the 3rd Battalion, Coldstream Guards. He also played first-class cricket for the British Army cricket team.

He was the grandson of Thomas Bevan (politician).

== Life and military career ==
Bevan was born at Crayford in February 1900 to Wilfred Bevan and his wife, Ethel. He was educated at Eton College, before attending the Royal Military College, Sandhurst. Graduating from Sandhurst in December 1919, he entered into the Coldstream Guards as a second lieutenant. Two years later he was promoted to the rank of lieutenant in December 1921. He later appeared in a single first-class cricket match for the British Army cricket team against the Royal Air Force at The Oval in 1928. Batting twice in the match, he was dismissed for 6 runs by Richard Utley in the Army's first-innings, while following-on in their second-innings he was dismissed by Charles Blount for a single run.

Bevan was promoted to the rank of captain in November 1929. He was promoted to the rank of major in September 1937. Bevan served during the Second World War and was mentioned in dispatches for distinguished service in the Middle East during the period December 1940–February 1941. He was promoted to the rank of lieutenant colonel during the war and commanded the 3rd Battalion, Coldstream Guards during the Western Desert campaign. He saw action at the Battle of Gazala and The Cauldron. Days after the engagements at The Cauldron, Bevan was present at the Knightsbridge Box with the 201st Guards Brigade when it was attacked and surrounded by the 15th Panzer Division on 11 June 1942. He was seriously wounded the following day and died from his wounds shortly after.

Bevan was survived by his wife, Sylvia of Oakham, Rutland. He was subsequently buried at the Tobruk War Cemetery.
