= William Alcock =

William Alcock may refer to:

- William Alcock (footballer) (1860–1930), Irish footballer
- William Alcock Tully (1830–1905), Irish surveyor general of Queensland
- William Congreve Alcock (c. 1771–1813), Irish parliamentarian from Waterford
- William Alcock, Irish MP from Fethard, County Wexford 1764–1767

== See also ==
- William Aucock (1882–1937), British trade union leader
