= Union of Jute, Flax and Kindred Textile Operatives =

Former Scottish trade union

- Merged into: National Union of Dyers, Bleachers and Textile Workers
- Founded: 1906
- Dissolved: 1979
- Location: United Kingdom
- Members: 20,000 (1920s)
- Affiliations: GFTU, STUC, TUC

The Union of Jute, Flax and Kindred Textile Operatives was a trade union representing workers in the textile trades in and around Dundee in Scotland.

The union was founded after a major strike in the industry in Dundee. The strikers had no official union representation, as the Dundee and District Mill and Factory Operatives Union opposed the action. As a result, in 1906, Mary Macarthur and John Reed of Dundee Trades Council founded it as the Dundee and District Union of Jute and Flax Workers. On formation, it had 3,964 members, of whom two-thirds were women, rising to 5,000 by 1910.

John Sime became prominent in the union as its president, then as its general secretary. Under his leadership, the union came into conflict with the rival Dundee and District Mill and Factory Operatives Union, eventually coming to dominate the industry in the city. By the 1920s, membership had reached a peak of 20,000, but this gradually declined due to redundancies in the industry.

By 1979, the union had fewer than 2,000 members remaining, and it merged into the National Union of Dyers, Bleachers and Textile Workers.

== General Secretaries ==
1906: William Egerton
1908: John Sime
1940: Thomas Matthew Ferguson
1947: John Duffy
1958: Robert Doyle
1971: Margaret Fenwick

== Presidents ==
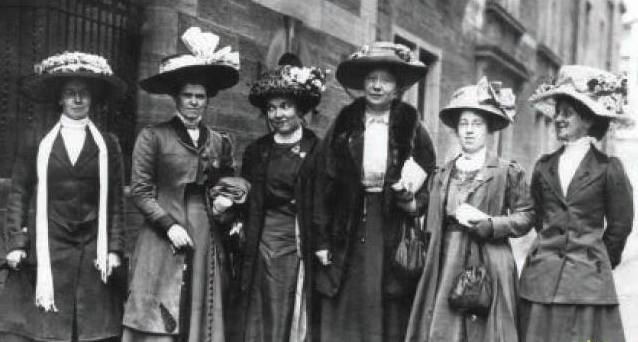
First women delegates to the STUC in 1911 in Dundee: L-R Jeanie Spence, Mrs Lamont, Agnes Brown, Mary Macarthur, Kate McLean? and Rachel Devine?

1906: John Sime
1908: Nicholas Marra
1911: Mary Wood
1924: Rachel Devine
1930: Jeannie Spence
1933: Robert Doyle
1937:
1945: Robert Doyle
1956:
