= John Lindsley =

John Lindsley may refer to:

- John Berrien Lindsley (1822–1897), American minister
- John Lindsley (trade unionist) (1889–?), British trade unionist and political activist
