= General Union of Lancashire and Yorkshire Warp Dressers' Association =

Former trade union of the United Kingdom

- Predecessor: Federated Society of Warpdressers
- Founded: 26 May 1894
- Dissolved: 1970
- Headquarters: 34 Greenhill Road, Bramley
- Location: England
- Members: 3,362 (1914)
- Affiliations: GFTU, NCTTF

The General Union of Lancashire and Yorkshire Warp Dressers' Association was a trade union representing workers involved in preparing warp yarn for weaving who were based in northern England.

== History ==
The origins of the union lay in the Federated Society of Warpdressers, founded in 1891. Three years later, it was reformed as the "General Union", with local unions in Bradford, Chorley, Halifax, Manchester, Nelson, Preston, Rochdale and Skipton affiliating. Unusually for a textile union, it covered workers in a variety of materials, including cotton, wool and worsted. It was also unusual in that it did not provide any support for industrial action, but instead saw its principal purpose as an employment exchange, helping unemployed members find work in other mills. Within Yorkshire, it also recruited twisters and drawers, but those workers in Lancashire instead joined the Amalgamated Association of Beamers, Twisters and Drawers (Hand and Machine).

Affiliates of the union included:

Union	Founded	Affiliated	Membership (1907)	Notes
Bradford and District	1887	1891	700	Merged into Yorkshire Society of Textile Craftsmen 1952
Chorley and District	1890	1891	46	Merged into Nelson and District 1930s
Halifax and District	1887	1891	c.100	Merged into Yorkshire Society of Textile Craftsmen 1952
Huddersfield and District	1907		109	Merged into Yorkshire Society of Textile Craftsmen 1952
Leeds and District	1898		120	Merged into Yorkshire Society of Textile Craftsmen 1975
Manchester and District	1882	1891	417	
Nelson and District	1886	1891	1,171	
Rochdale and District	1890	1891	164	Dissolved 1930s
Skipton and District	1891	1891	c.200	Dissolved 1920s

On formation, the union had only 1,179 members, but this steadily increased until 1914, when it peaked at 3,362. It affiliated to the Northern Counties Textile Trades Federation. It lost members when the Chorley and Preston societies disaffiliated, but these later rejoined; however, membership did not recover, and by 1949 was down to only 1,040. Faced with this decline, the Bradford and Halifax societies merged with two unaffiliated bodies: the Leeds Warpdressers and the Textile Daymen and Cloth Pattern Makers, forming the Yorkshire Society of Textile Craftsmen, the new organisation maintaining its affiliation.

In 1970, the union dissolved, its remaining constituents gradually merging into the Association of Preparatory Workers.

== General Secretaries ==
1891: W. Clayton
1899: James White
1928: Cameron W. Doodson
1962: Walter Rothwell
