= John Sime =

Scottish trade union leader

John Sime (died 1943) was a Scottish trade union leader.

In 1906, Sime was the founding president of the Dundee and District Union of Jute and Flax Workers. Two years later, he became its general secretary, and for many years the union thrived. It became increasingly hostile to the rival Dundee and District Mill and Factory Operatives' Union, which was opposed to strikes, and by 1919, it was the dominant union in the city, with 20,000 members.

In 1923, Sime led a strike at the Camperdown Works; although the workers there remained solid in support of the action, workers elsewhere in the city did not undertake solidarity action, and after many weeks, the strike was lost. Despite the defeat, the union remained active, and Sime remained prominent.

In 1925/26, Sime and local Member of Parliament Tom Johnston visited Calcutta to investigate working conditions there, and reportedly positively on the recently established Bengal Jute Mill Workers' Union.

Sime served on the Management Committee of the General Federation of Trade Unions from 1921, becoming chair in 1928 and 1929, and later being a trustee. He retired in 1941, and died two years later.

Trade union offices
Preceded by New position	President of the Dundee and District Union of Jute and Flax Workers; 1906–1907	Succeeded by Nicholas Marra
Preceded by William Egerton	General Secretary of the Dundee and District Union of Jute and Flax Workers; 1908–1940	Succeeded by Thomas Matthew Ferguson
Preceded by Alex Hutchison	Chair of the General Federation of Trade Unions; 1928–1930	Succeeded by Charles Kean
