= General Federation of Trade Unions (UK) =

National trade union centre in the United Kingdom

- General Federation of Trade Unions
- Founded: 1899
- Headquarters: 86 Wood Lane, Quorn, Leicestershire
- Location: United Kingdom
- Members: 214,000
- Key people: Gawain Little, General Secretary
- Website: www.gftu.org.uk

The General Federation of Trade Unions (GFTU) is a national trade union centre in the United Kingdom. It has 35 affiliates with a membership of just over 214,000 and describes itself as the "federation for specialist unions".

== History ==
In the 1890s, the development of socialist organisations and socialist thinking also found expression in the British trade union movement. Many of the new unions formed during that period were committed to the socialist transformation of society and were critical of the conservatism of the craft unions. The debate revolved around concept of building "one-big-union" which would have the resources to embark on a militant course of action and even change society. This thinking gained strength after the 1897 Engineering Employers Federation lockout which resulted in a defeat for engineering workers.

The view that it was necessary to develop a strong, centralised trade union organisation by forming a federation, which had been rejected only two years earlier, was now endorsed at the Trades Union Congress of September 1897. This resulted in the establishment of the General Federation of Trade Unions at a special Congress of the TUC in 1899, the principal objective of which was to set up a national organisation with a strike fund which could be drawn upon by affiliated trade unions.

GFTU participated in the foundation of the International Federation of Trade Unions at the Concertgebouw, Amsterdam in July 1919.

The federation has seen a large turnover of members, due largely to mergers in the movement. In 1979, its members were:

- Amalgamated Association of Beamers, Twisters and Drawers
- Amalgamated Felt Hat Trimers', Woolformers' and Allied Workers' Union
- Amalgamated Society of Journeymen Felt Hatters and Allied Workers
- Amalgamated Textile Workers' Union
- Amalgamated Union of Asphalt Workers
- Associated Metalworkers' Union
- Card Setting Machine Tenters' Society
- Ceramic and Allied Trades Union
- Cloth Pressers' Society
- Furniture, Timber and Allied Trades Union
- General Union of Associations of Loom Overlookers
- Hinckley Dyers' and Auxiliary Association
- Huddersfield Healders and Twisters Trade and Friendly Society
- Jewel Case and Jewellery Display Makers' Union
- Lancashire Amalgamated Tape Sizers' Association
- Lancashire Box, Packing Case and General Woodworkers' Society
- National Association of Licensed House Managers
- National Society of Brushmakers and General Workers
- National Society of Metal Mechanics
- National Union of Hosiery and Knitwear Workers
- National Union of Lock and Metal Workers
- National Union of Tailors and Garment Workers
- Nelson and District Association of Preparatory Workers
- Northern Carpet Trade Union
- Nottingham and District Dyers' and Bleachers' Association
- Rossendale Union of Boot, Shoe and Slipper Operatives
- Scottish Lace and Textile Workers' Union
- Screw, Nut, Bolt and Rivet Trade union
- Society of Shuttlemakers
- Tobacco Mechanics' Association
- Yorkshire Society of Textile Craftsmen

By 2016, none of the 1979 members remained as independent unions.

== Current role ==
The GFTU now concentrates on servicing the needs of specialist unions. It does this by providing courses, undertaking research for its affiliated Unions and administering a Pension Scheme for officials and staff of affiliated Unions. In keeping with its original objectives, the Federation pays dispute benefit in appropriate cases to affiliated Unions.

The Governing Body is the Biennial General Council Meeting, attended by delegates from affiliated Unions, at which policy and rule changes are debated and an Executive Committee of 14 members elected to meet on a monthly basis between Biennial General Council Meetings.

The Federation undertakes its Parliamentary activities by working closely with John Mann MP, Member of Parliament Bassetlaw constituency, particularly in respect of proposed legislation.

== Affiliated unions ==
- Aegis the Union
- Artists' Union England
- Association of Educational Psychologists
- Bakers, Food and Allied Workers Union
- Communication Workers' Union
- Community
- Coordinating Committee of International Staff Unions and Associations of the United Nations System
- Equal Justice The Union
- Gibraltar General and Clerical Association
- Hospital Consultants' and Specialists' Association
- Napo
- Nautilus International
- NHBC Staff Association
- Pharmacists' Defence Association
- POA
- Professional Cricketers' Association
- Professional Footballers' Association
- Psychotherapy and Counselling Union
- Public and Commercial Services Union
- Social Workers' Union
- Society of Union Employees
- Transport Salaried Staffs Association (TSSA)
- Workers' Educational Association

== General Secretaries ==
1899: Isaac Mitchell
1907: William A. Appleton
1938: George Bell
1953: Leslie Hodgson
1978: Peter Potts
1991: Michael Bradley
2010: Doug Nicholls
2023: Gawain Little

== Chairs ==
Year	Name	Union
1899	Pete Curran	National Union of Gasworkers and General Labourers
1910	Allan Gee	General Union of Weavers and Textile Workers
1912	James O'Grady	National Amalgamated Furnishing Trades Association
1918	Joseph Cross	Amalgamated Weavers' Association
1920	Thomas Mallalieu	Amalgamated Society of Journeymen Felt Hatters
1922	Alfred Short	National Union of Docks, Wharves and Shipping Staffs
1924	Fred Birchenough	Amalgamated Association of Operative Cotton Spinners and Twiners
1926	Alex Hutchison	National Union of Stove Grate Workers
1928	John Sime	Dundee and District Union of Jute and Flax Workers
1930	Charles Kean	Wallpaper Workers' Union
1932	William Aucock	National Society of Pottery Workers
1934	William Saxon	Amalgamated Machine, Engine and Iron Grinders' and Glazers' Society
1936	Joseph Frayne	Amalgamated Association of Card and Blowing and Ring Room Operatives
1938	Andrew Naesmith	Amalgamated Weavers' Association
1940	John Lee	Amalgamated Textile Warehousemen's Association
1942	Albert Taylor	Rossendale Union of Boot, Shoe and Slipper Operatives
1944	Horace Moulden	National Union of Hosiery and Knitwear Workers
1946	Frank Dickinson	Yorkshire Association of Power Loom Overlookers
1948	Fred Worthington	Felt Hatters' and Trimmers' Unions of Great Britain
1950	Albert Knowles	Amalgamated Association of Operative Cotton Spinners and Twiners
1952	Archie Robertson	National Association of Card, Blowing and Ring Room Operatives
1954	Cecil Heap	Wallpaper Workers' Union
1956	Bert Head	Chain Makers' and Strikers' Association
1958	Jack Wigglesworth	Iron, Steel and Metal Dressers' Society
1959	Alf Tomkins	National Union of Furniture Trade Operatives
1961	Robert Driver	Rossendale Union of Boot, Shoe and Slipper Operatives
1963	Fred Titherington	General Union of Associations of Loom Overlookers
1964	Leonard Jackson	National Society of Pottery Workers
1965	James W. Whitworth	Amalgamated Association of Operative Cotton Spinners and Twiners
1966	Edwin D. Sleeman	Yorkshire Association of Power Loom Overlookers
1967	Robert Doyle	Union of Jute, Flax and Kindred Textile Operatives
1968	F. C. Henry	Waterproof Garment Workers' Trade Union
1969	Fred Hague	Amalgamated Weavers' Association
1970	Jim Browning	National Union of Textile and Allied Workers
1971	Arthur Howcroft	General Union of Associations of Loom Overlookers
1972	Ken Arnold	Ceramic and Allied Trades Union
1973	Edward Tullock	Associated Metalworkers' Union
1974	Harold Gibson	National Union of Hosiery and Knitwear Workers
1975	Tom Whittaker	Rossendale Union of Boot, Shoe and Slipper Operatives
1976	Margaret Fenwick	Union of Jute, Flax and Kindred Textile Operatives
1977	D. Hill	Society of Lithographic Artists, Designers and Engravers
1978	David Coates	Furniture, Timber and Allied Trades Union
1979	John Martin	National Union of Lock and Metal Workers
1980	Harry M. Wareham	Amalgamated Union of Asphalt Workers
1981	Leslie R. Smith	Northern Carpet Trades Union
1982	Joe Quinn	Amalgamated Textile Workers Union
1983	Anne Spencer	National Union of Tailors and Garment Workers
1984	Charles P. McCarthy	National Society of Metal Mechanics
1985	David Lambert	National Union of Hosiery and Knitwear Workers
1987	James McChristie	GMB Union
1989	Michael Murray	Rossendale Union of Boot, Shoe and Slipper Operatives
1991	Keith Edmondson	Northern Carpet Trades Union
1993	Alfred Hitchmough	Amalgamated Society of Textile Workers and Kindred Trades
1995	Ron Marron	Associated Metalworkers Union
1997	Tony McCarthy	National Union of Domestic Appliances and General Operatives
1999	Terry Pye	Manufacturing, Science and Finance
2001	Michael J. Leahy	Community
2003	Des Farrell	GMB Union
2005	Garry Oakes	Ceramic and Allied Trades Union
2007	Doug Nicholls	Community and Youth Workers' Union
2009	Joe Marino	Bakers, Food and Allied Workers' Union
2011	Joe Mann	Community
2013	John Fray	National Union of Journalists
2015	Ben Marshall	Prospect
2017	John Smith	Musicians' Union
2019	Oshor Williams	Professional Footballers' Association
2021	Roy Rickhuss	Community
2023	Sarah Woolley	Bakers, Food and Allied Workers' Union

== See also ==
- List of trade unions
- List of trade unions in the United Kingdom
- List of federations of trade unions
- Trades Union Congress
- Scottish Trades Union Congress
- Irish Congress of Trade Unions
