= Scottish Lace and Textile Workers' Union =

Scottish trade union

The Scottish Lace and Textile Workers' Union was a trade union representing textile workers in Scotland.

== History ==
The union was founded in 1890 as the Newmilns and District Textile Workers' Union and Friendly Benefit Society, a local union representing twisthands in the Newmilns area of Ayrshire in Scotland. It gradually grew, reaching 430 members in 1906, and more than 1,000 by 1910.

In 1916, the union renamed itself as the Scottish Lace and Textile Workers' Union, claiming the right to organise textile workers across Scotland. It did increase its membership to around 2,000, and it joined the British Lace Operatives' Federation. While it tended to dominate the activities of the federation, the English Amalgamated Society of Operative Lace Makers was of similar size. However, in 1971, the Operative Lace Makers merged into the National Union of Hosiery and Knitwear Workers. The Scottish union decided to remain an independent union, dissolving the federation and affiliating with the General Federation of Trade Unions and the Scottish Trades Union Congress (STUC). It was one of the last two Scottish industrial unions affiliated to the STUC, alongside the Scottish Carpet Workers' Union.

By 1982, the union had only 942 members, based in Darvel, Kilmarnock and Newmilns. The following year, it merged into the GMB, its former members in 1991 being moved into the union's new Clothing and Textiles Section.

== General Secretaries ==
George Girvan
1935: Robert Calderwood
1940: George Girvan
1950s: H. Morton
1965: W. Dempster
1970: Bob Connell
1978: Jimmy McChristie
