= Isaac Mitchell (trade unionist) =

Early Scottish trade unionist

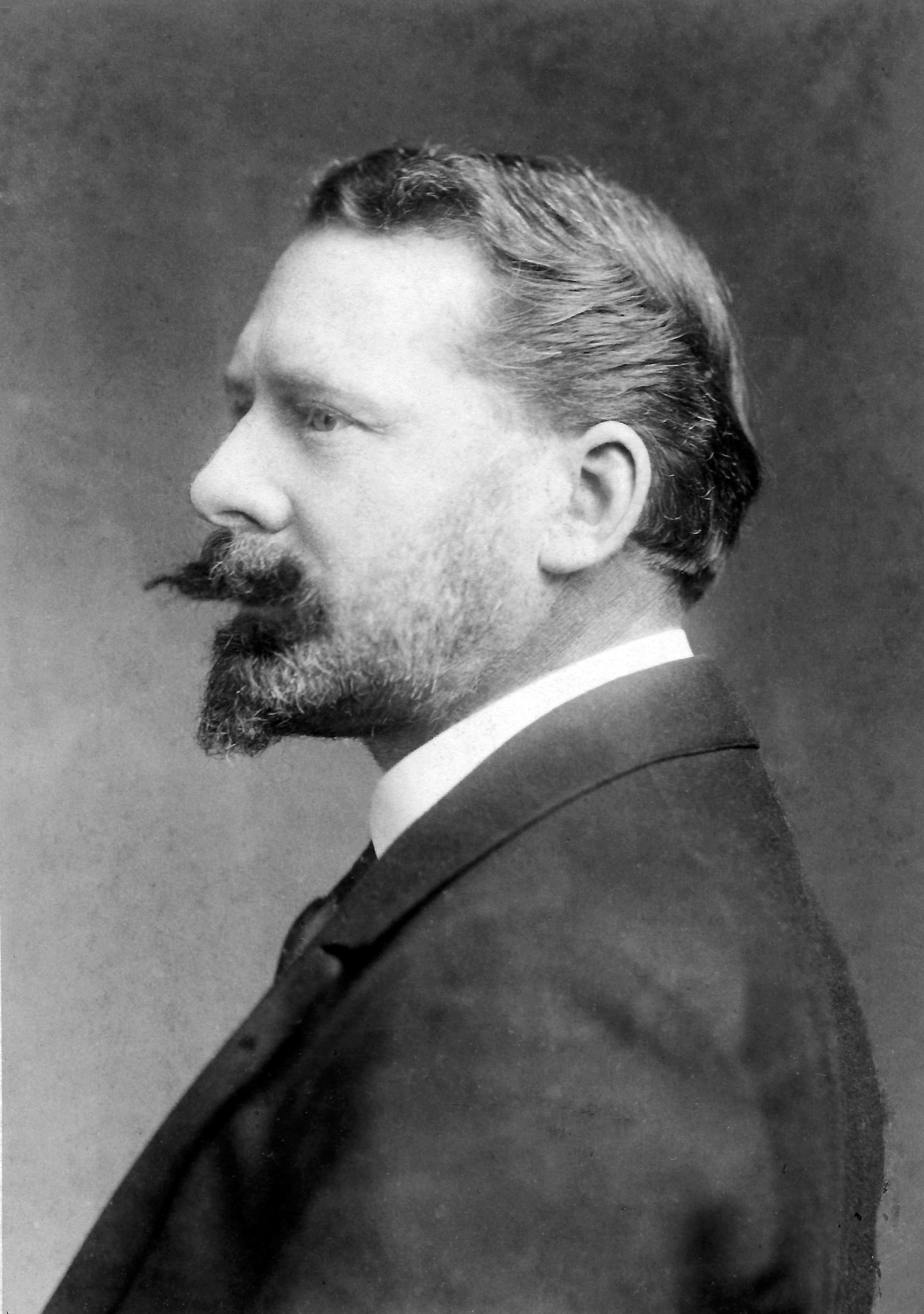
Isaac Haig Mitchell in 1903

Isaac Haig Mitchell (26 June 1867 – 15 March 1952) was the first general secretary of the General Federation of Trade Unions (GFTU), when it was founded in 1899, a post he held until 1907 when he took up a position with the Board of Trade of the British Government.

Isaac Haig Mitchell was born on June 26, 1867, in Roxburgh, Roxburghshire, Scotland, the son of Isabella and Alexander. He had one daughter with Margaret Mitchell. He then married Avis Chatterley Baird in 1927, and died on 15 March 1952, in London, England, at the age of 84.

== Early life ==
Isaac’s father, Alexander Mitchell (1816 – 1894) was a wool dyer and scourer, born in Eccles who lived all his life in the borders area between Scotland and England, and died in Hawick in 1894.

Born in Roxburghshire, Mitchell remained in school as a pupil-teacher after his classmates left to start work. He later completed an apprenticeship in engineering and in 1891 was living in Heaton which is a suburb of the city of Newcastle upon Tyne. There, he joined the Amalgamated Society of Engineers (ASE), and was immediately elected as its delegate to Newcastle Trades Council. Through this, he worked with John Burns in supporting a railway strike.

== Industrial organisation ==
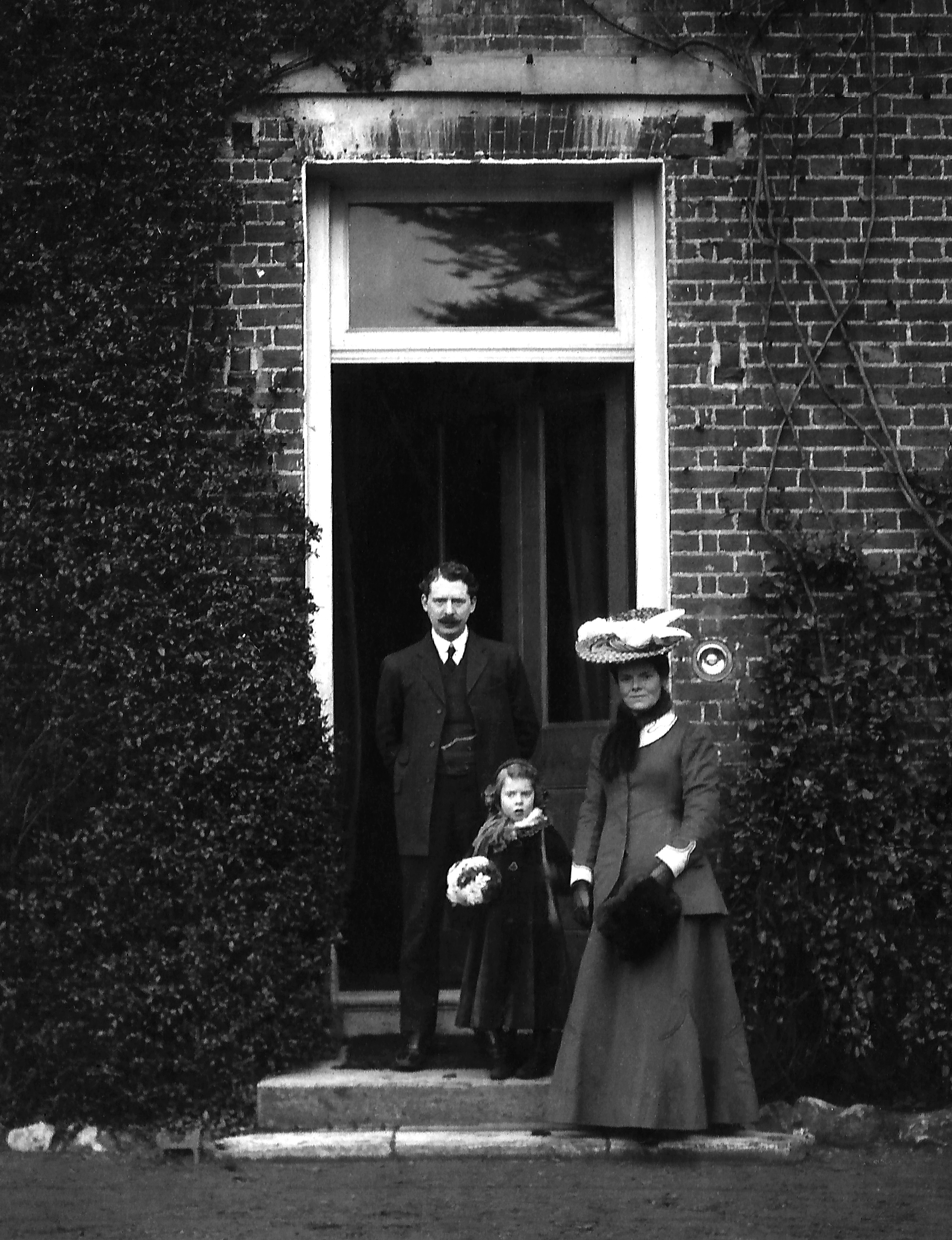
Isaac Haig Mitchell with Margaret Mitchell and their daughter in 1906

In about 1892, Michell moved to New York City, where he found work as a millwright, just six years after the Haymarket Affair in Chicago. He joined the young Socialist Labor Party of America and the esoteric Theosophical Society.

He moved back to Galashiels in Scotland in 1894, where he founded an early branch of the Independent Labour Party, which was only five years old at the time. He then moved on to Glasgow, where he was the ASE's delegate to the Trades Union Congress (TUC). He was elected to the Parliamentary Committee of the TUC in 1898.

His profession was listed as 'Mechanical Engineer' on his marriage certificate in 1899 and as 'Trade Union Secretary' on his daughter's birth certificate in 1901.

== General Federation of Trade Unions ==
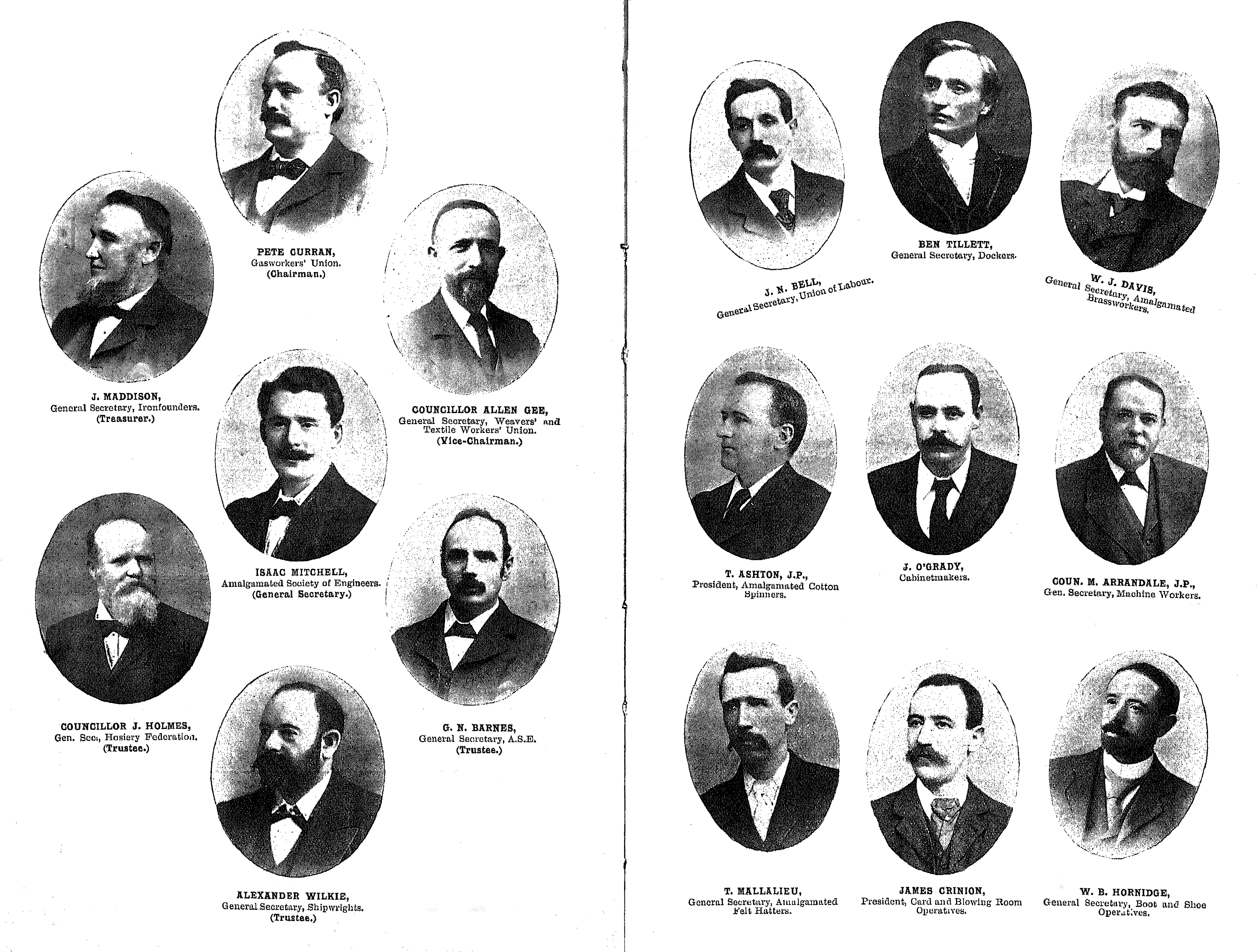
GFTU management committee 1901

In 1899 Mitchell became the first general secretary of the British General Federation of Trades Unions (GFTU). The GFTU were created by the TUC to bring all trade unions under one banner to act as an arbitration committee for industrial disputes and administrating a national strike fund. In 2024 the GFTU federation includes a joint membership of over 600,000 union members, ranging from 28 different union affiliates.

In contrast to other leading figures in the GFTU, Mitchell focused on conciliation and attracting new member unions to affiliate. The Joint Board of the TUC, GFTU and Labour Representation Committee (LRC) was formed in 1905, and Mitchell became its joint secretary.

Mitchell was also politically active. In 1904, he was elected as a Progressive Party alderman on the London County Council, elected in March 1904 for a six-year term, he resigned in 1907. He also stood for member of parliament for the LRC in Darlington at the 1906 general election, and he was only narrowly defeated.

== Board of Trade ==
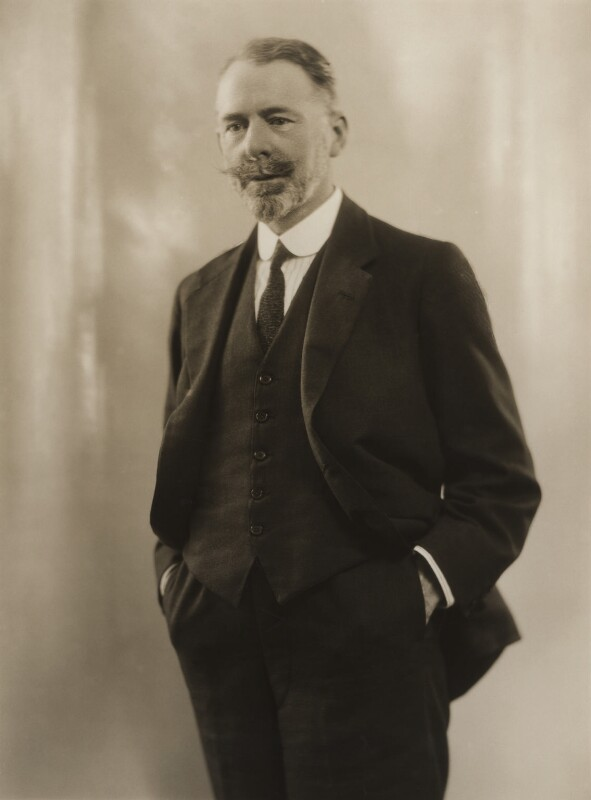
English delegate to Canada and the United States. Mitchell portrait by Bassano in 1926 NPG, London.

In 1907, Mitchell accepted an offer to work as an adviser to the Board of Trade, resigning all his trade union and political offices. He became known as "Haig Mitchell", and also apparently drew a distinction with his past by growing a beard. In April 1927 the London Gazette lists him as 'Ministry of Labour: Principal Conciliation Officer', where he remained until his retirement in 1932, by which time he was the Chief Conciliator. He was notably supportive of increases in the salaries of trade union leaders, and led initial investigations into the Clyde Workers' Committee, informing David Lloyd George that the Socialist Labour Party was centrally involved.

== Later life ==
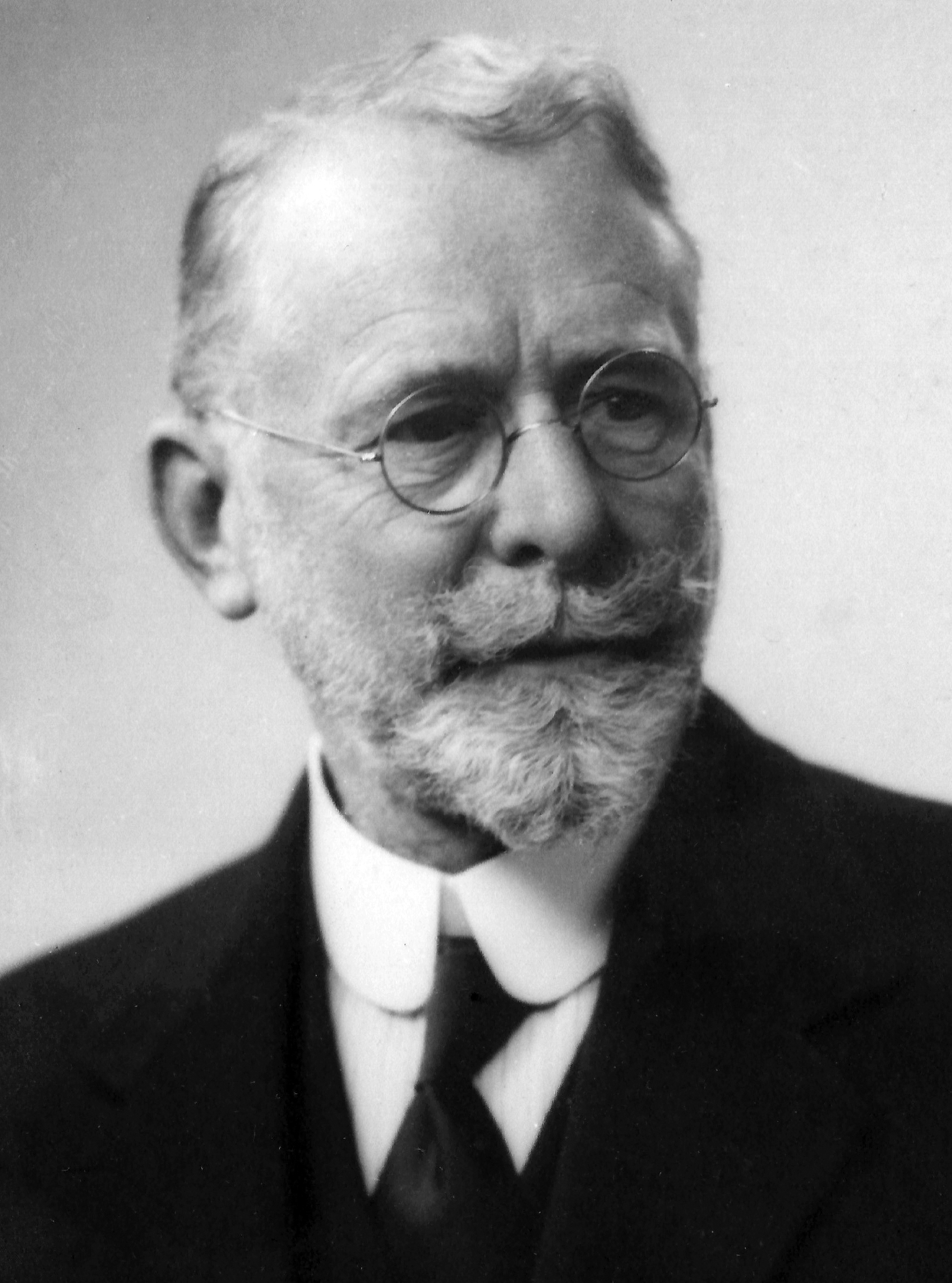
Isaac Haig Mitchell in 1929

Non-profit organization positions
Preceded by New position	General Secretary of the General Federation of Trade Unions; 1899 – 1907	Succeeded by William A. Appleton
