= Edward Duxbury =

British trade unionist

Edward Duxbury (1863–?) was a British trade unionist. He held important roles in both the Labour Party and the Trades Union Congress.

Born in Manchester, Duxbury began working in a spinning factory in the Rossendale Valley when he was eight years old. Initially a doffer, he gradually worked his way up to become a loom overlooker.

Duxbury joined the General Union of Loom Overlookers (GULO), and in 1913 he was elected as its general secretary, initially serving jointly with James E. Tattersall. During World War I, he served on the Cotton Control Board. In 1921, he became the president of the Northern Counties Textile Trades Federation. GULO was affiliated to the United Textile Factory Workers' Association, and Duxbury served as its vice president. He also served a year as an auditor of the Trades Union Congress, and was a trustee of the Cotton Memorial Fund.

Duxbury was a supporter of the Labour Party, and served on Chadderton Urban District Council for nine years. In 1923, he was elected to the National Executive Committee of the Labour Party, serving a single year.

In 1930, Duxbury served on a commission to investigate cotton production in East Asia. He retired from his trade union posts in 1935. In 1936, he stood unsuccessfully for Bury Council.

Trade union offices
Preceded by James E. Tattersall	General Secretary of the General Union of Loom Overlookers; 1913–1935; With: James E. Tattersall (1913–1921)	Succeeded by Jeremiah Proctor
Preceded by Edward Judson and David Watts Morgan	Auditor of the Trades Union Congress; 1913–1914; With: James Brown	Succeeded by Tom Shaw and J. Wood
Preceded by Albert Smith	Vice President of the United Textile Factory Workers' Association; 1919–1935	Succeeded by James Stott
