= Sarah Woolley =

British trade union leader

Sarah Woolley (born 1987) is a British trade union leader, the first ever woman to lead the Bakers, Food and Allied Workers' Union (BFAWU).

Woolley joined BFAWU while working part-time at a Bakers Oven shop. She became full-time, and later a shop manager, while Bakers Oven became part of Greggs. Following the merger, Woolley met the branch secretary and became active, firstly as a shop steward, and was later elected onto its national executive committee, then became a full time official. She is also the 2023-2025 President of the GFTU General Federation of Trade Unions.

Woolley was elected as leader of the union in 2019, and took up the post on 1 May 2020.

In the 2020 Labour Party leadership election, Woolley supported Rebecca Long-Bailey.

Trade union offices
Preceded by Ronnie Draper	General Secretary of the Bakers, Food and Allied Workers' Union; 2020–present	Succeeded by Incumbent
Preceded by Roy Rickhuss	President of the General Federation of Trade Unions; 2023–present	Succeeded by Incumbent
