= National Union of Domestic Appliances and General Operatives =

Former trade union of the United Kingdom

- Merged into: Community
- Founded: 1890
- Dissolved: 2006
- Headquarters: Imperial Buildings, Rotherham
- Location: United Kingdom
- Members: 5,500 (1980)
- Affiliations: CSEU, GFTU, LMTU, TUC, Labour

The National Union of Domestic Appliances and General Operatives (NUDAGO) was a trade union representing metal workers in the United Kingdom, principally in the town of Rotherham. It primarily represented workers employed in manufacturing whitegoods, but also had some membership in foundries and light engineering.

== History ==
The union was founded in 1890, following a successful strike in the light metal industry in Rotherham, led by the Knights of Labor. Initially named the National Union of Stove Grate Workers, it gradually recruited members in other parts of Yorkshire, Lancashire and the Midlands, and created a small branch in London. Over time, it expanded its remit, and was renamed the National Union of Stove Grate and General Metal Workers, then as the National Union of Domestic Appliance and General Metal Workers, before adopting its final name.

Never a large union, by 1979 it had 5,500 members, declining to 2,250 in 1997.

In 2006, the union merged into Community.

== General secretaries ==
1890s: William Knowles
1909: Alex Hutchison
1928: Adam Bennett
1953: Jack Higham
1979: Reg Preston
1989: Tony McCarthy
