= Frank Dickinson =

British trade union leader (1879–1962)

Frank Dickinson OBE (16 December 1879 – 7 January 1962) was a British trade union leader.

Born in Saltaire, Dickinson first came to prominence in 1915, when he was elected as the general secretary of the Bradford and District Power Loom Overlookers' Society. During World War I, he also served on the Wool Control Board. In 1916, he was a founder member of the National Association of Unions in the Textile Trade (NAUTT). In 1921, he was also elected as secretary of the Yorkshire Association of Power Loom Overlookers.

During World War II, Dickinson again served on the Wool Control Board, and from 1943 to 1946 he chaired the NAUTT. He then moved to become chair of the General Federation of Trade Unions (GFTU), serving for two years.

Dickinson was made an Officer of the Order of the British Empire in 1953, and finally stood down from his union posts in 1960.

Trade union offices
| Preceded by J. W. Butler | General Secretary of the Yorkshire Association of Power Loom Overlookers; 1921 – 1960 | Succeeded by Edwin D. Sleeman |
| Preceded by Horace Moulden | Chairman of the General Federation of Trade Unions; 1946 – 1948 | Succeeded by Fred Worthington |
