= Margaret Fenwick =

Scottish trade unionist

Margaret Taylor Naysmith Fenwick (19 August 1919 – 8 February 1992), born Margaret Mands, was a Scottish trade unionist, who became the leader of her trade union.

Born in Dundee, Fenwick was educated at Stobswell School, leaving at the age of fourteen to undertake an apprenticeship as a weaver at the Scottish Co-operative Wholesale Society's Taybank Works. She followed in a family tradition of becoming an active trade unionist, joining the Dundee and District Union of Jute and Flax Workers, and within a year achieved success in campaigning for apprentices to be paid at the same rate regardless of age.

In about 1948, Fenwick was elected to the Management Committee of the union, and that year married Andrew Small Fenwick, a co-worker; the couple had four children. She tried to become a shop steward in 1950, but the company management refused to allow this, claiming that because she was married and had young children, she would be unable to fulfil the role to the same standard as a single person.

Fenwick continued her activity in the union, which was renamed as the Union of Jute, Flax and Kindred Textile Operatives. She was elected as Assistant General Secretary in 1960, then as General Secretary in 1971. she served on various government committees relating to the jute industry, and was made a Member of the Order of the British Empire in 1973.

In 1976, Fenwick served as chair of the General Federation of Trade Unions, the first woman to hold the post.

Fenwick announced her retirement in 1978. Her post was not filled, as the union merged into the National Union of Dyers, Bleachers and Textile Workers the following May. In retirement, she focused on her role as a magistrate, and also served on industrial tribunals.

Trade union offices
Preceded by Robert Doyle	General Secretary of the Union of Jute, Flax and Kindred Textile Operatives; 1971 – 1978	Succeeded by Post abolished
Preceded by Tom Whittaker	Chair of the General Federation of Trade Unions; 1976	Succeeded by D. Hill
