= W. A. Appleton =

British trade union leader

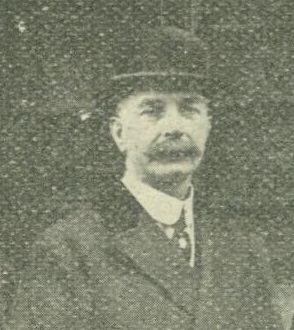
Appleton in 1918, while on a trade union delegation to Washington DC

William Archibald Appleton (31 December 1859 – 20 November 1940) was a British trade union leader.

Born in Nottinghamshire, Appleton attended the Trinity Day School and St Luke's Evening School before working making lace and hosiery in Nottingham. He joined the Amalgamated Society of Operative Lace Makers and was elected its general secretary in 1896, after its previous leader was sacked as he had been involved in fraud. Appleton ran the union in the style of a guild, with admission fees of up to £15 and benefits including two saloon bars in Nottingham exclusively for members' use, and loans of up to £200 available in order for members to set up their own businesses. He represented the union at the Trades Union Congress (TUC), but was unsuccessful in securing a powerful position in the wider trade union movement.

In 1898, Appleton was elected to Nottingham City Council, serving until 1907. He founded the International Lacemakers' Federation in 1900, with corresponding unions in Scotland and France. The following year, he became president of Nottingham Trades Council, serving until 1907, and affiliated the Lacemakers to the General Federation of Trade Unions (GFTU), and was elected to its management committee in 1903.

Isaac Mitchell, the secretary of the GFTU, resigned in 1907. Appleton was one of five candidates for the post, but the only one who was a member of the management committee. He won more than half the votes cast and was elected to the post. He stood down as secretary of the Lacemakers' Society, but remained treasurer of the International.

Initially, Appleton did not make significant changes to the GFTU. He focused on resolving disputes with employers and between unions, and attempted to recruit new affiliates through canvassing at Labour Party conferences. He promoted international links, and became a close friend of Samuel Gompers. During the 1910s, the organisation started to stagnate, many of its larger affiliates leaving, as they saw little need for the organisation when they held membership of the Trades Union Congress (TUC) and affiliations to the Labour Party. But there were successes, when the federation set up its own insurance scheme, which was very popular with smaller unions, without the resources to provide their own schemes. Appleton personally became a strong supporter of World War I and in 1917, he was made a Commander of the Order of the British Empire. When he and James O'Grady lobbied the government with specific proposals for increasing soldiers' pay, these were eventually implemented - albeit only in the summer of 1919.

During the war, Appleton organised two conferences of trade unionists from Allied countries, and in 1918 he travelled to the United States, on the invitation of Gompers, to speak to American trade unionists about the war effort. While the GFTU was excluded from the negotiations which set up the International Federation of Trade Unions (IFTU), Appleton represented the federation at its founding conference, and he was elected as the IFTU's first president. He defeated Jan Oudegeest, being acceptable both to Gompers and to the delegates from Germany and Austria. The following year, the TUC persuaded the IFTU that, as the larger body, it should represent the UK, and Appleton's term as president ended.

By 1919, the GFTU's journal, The Federationist, had a substantial deficit. Appleton took personal control of it, in exchange for taking responsibility for its debt, and renamed it The Democrat. He used it to promote his personal views, supporting the Liberal Party and attacking Robert Smillie and the Miners' Federation of Great Britain. Despite it no longer being the official journal of the GFTU, it was circulated to its members, and its views were widely interpreted as being the federation's policy, leading to much criticism from the TUC. The largest remaining unions left the federation after the UK general strike, as the federation had refused strike pay for their members, and by this point Sam Elsbury, a communist from the National Union of Tailors and Garment Workers described Appleton as "one of the worst lickspittles of the capitalist class that we have in this country today".

Appleton finally retired in 1938, and died two years later.

Trade union offices
Preceded by S. Varney	General Secretary of the Amalgamated Society of Operative Lace Makers and Auxiliary Workers; 1896–1907	Succeeded by Charles Wardle
Preceded by Isaac Mitchell	General Secretary of the General Federation of Trade Unions; 1907–1938	Succeeded by George Bell
Preceded by New position	President of the International Federation of Trade Unions; 1919–1920	Succeeded by J. H. Thomas
