= John Lindsley (trade unionist) =

John Lindsley (5 November 1886 – 1960) was a British trade unionist and political activist.

Lindsley was born in Sunderland and worked as a clerk. He joined the Independent Labour Party (ILP) at an early age and was chosen as secretary of the Sunderland ILP in 1907. He began working for Newcastle upon Tyne Council, and in 1908 formed the first branch of the National Union of Clerks (NUC) in North East England. He soon formed a Northern Council in the union, promoting the creation of other branches in the area.

In 1910, Lindsley was selected to contest Barkston Ash for the Labour Party. He ultimately withdrew his candidacy, but was selected as Prospective Parliamentary Candidate for Dumfries Burghs in 1911. Due to the outbreak of World War I, no election was held until 1918, and by that time, Lindsley's political views had changed. A strong supporter of British involvement in the war, he resigned from the ILP, and joined the National Democratic and Labour Party (NDP), standing unsuccessfully for it in Houghton-le-Spring.

Lindsley continued his trade union activism, serving as president of Newcastle upon Tyne Trades Union Council in 1914, and as president of the National Union of Clerks in 1915/16. He also spent a year as the union's paid National Propagandist Organiser, during which he focused on building up union membership in Wales. He then began working in Darlington as a publicity agent, making him ineligible to hold office in the NUC.

The NDP dissolved, and Lindsley became a supporter of the Conservative Party, standing unsuccessfully for the party in Jarrow at the 1923 UK general election. Disillusioned, he withdrew from party politics, and moved to Sydney in Australia. However, this did not prove a success and he soon returned to the UK, settling in Doncaster. There, he rejoined the NUC and the Labour Party.

He died in 1960, aged 74.

Trade union offices
Preceded by R. J. W. Scott	President of the National Union of Clerks; 1915–1916	Succeeded by Charles Latham
