= Doug Grieve =

Scottish trade unionist

Charles Douglas Grieve (27 April 1927 – December 1996) was a Scottish trade unionist.

Born in Partick, Grieve worked at the Mitchell factory in Glasgow. He joined the Tobacco Workers' Union (TWU), and was appointed to the joint post of national organiser and financial secretary. In October 1969, he succeeded Charles Butler as the union's general secretary.

In 1973, Grieve was elected to the General Council of the Trades Union Congress (TUC), on which he was part of a left-wing group, including Rodney Bickerstaffe, Ken Cameron, Bill Keys, Alan Sapper and Jim Slater. In 1981, he won election as chair of the Trades Councils Joint Consultative Committee, while, in 1983, he was expected to win election as President of the TUC, but the General Council was reorganised that year, and he lost his seat.

With the decline in tobacco-related employment in the UK, Grieve negotiated the merger of the TWU into the Technical, Administrative and Supervisory Section; once this was completed, in 1986, he retired.

In his spare time, Grieve organised a trade union brass band festival in County Durham, and he devoted much of his retirement to the event. He died in London in 1996.

Trade union offices
Preceded by Charles Butler	General Secretary of the Tobacco Workers' Union; 1969 – 1986	Succeeded by Position abolished
Preceded by Alf Allen and Stan Gretton	Food, Drink, etc. Group representative on the General Council of the TUC; 1973 – 1983; With: Alf Allen (1973 – 1979); Bill Whatley (1979 – 1983)	Succeeded by Council restructured
Preceded by Terry Parry	Chairman of the Trades Councils' Joint Consultative Committee; 1981 – 1986	Succeeded by Brian Nicholson
