= Baron Latham =

Title in the peerage of the United Kingdom

Barony Latham
- Creation date: 16 January 1942
- Created by: King George VI
- Peerage: Peerage of the United Kingdom
- First holder: Charles Latham
- Present holder: Dominic Latham, 2nd Baron Latham
- Heir presumptive: Anthony Latham
- Remainder to: Heirs male of the first baron's body lawfully begotten
- Motto: Bene est tentare ("It is good to try")

Baron Latham, of Hendon in the County of Middlesex, is a title in the Peerage of the United Kingdom. It was created in 1942 for the Labour politician Charles Latham. He was Leader of the London County Council from 1940 to 1947. As of 2017, the title is held by his grandson, the second Baron, who succeeded in 1970. He is the elder twin son of the Hon. Francis Charles Allman Latham (d. 1959). Lord Latham lives in Australia.

== Barons Latham (1942) ==
- Charles Latham, 1st Baron Latham (1888–1970)
- Dominic Charles Latham, 2nd Baron Latham (b. 1954)

The heir presumptive is the present holder's twin brother Anthony Latham (b. 1954).

== Arms ==
Coat of arms of Baron Latham
| Crest Two spurs one in bend the other in bend sinister rowels upwards Or straps Sable with buckles Gold. Escutcheon Per fess Gules and Chequy Or and Sable a fess barry wavy Argent and Azure in chief a seax fesswise point to the sinister cutting edge upwards Proper pommel and hilt of the second ensigned with a Saxon crown of the second. Supporters On either side a horse Sable charged on the shoulder with a plate and gorged with a mural coronet with a chain reflexed over the back Or. Motto Bene Est Tentare |
