= Sam Maddox =

British trade unionist

Samuel Maddox (died 1979) was a British trade unionist.

Maddox worked as a baker, and joined the Bakers, Food and Allied Workers' Union (BFAWU). In 1967, he won election to the union's executive council, but the following year he instead began working full-time for the union as a district organiser.

In 1975, Maddox was elected as general secretary of the union, serving until his death in 1979.

Trade union offices
Preceded by Stanley Gretton	General Secretary of the Bakers, Food and Allied Workers' Union; 1975–1979	Succeeded by Joe Marino
