= Kate McLean =

Catherine McLean
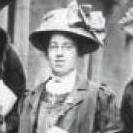
- in 1911 in Dundee
- Born: Catherine McLean; 6 January 1879; Glasgow, Scotland, United Kingdom of Great Britain and Ireland
- Died: 21 October 1960 (aged 81); Glasgow, Scotland, United Kingdom
- Other name: Kate Beaton
- Education: To age 12
- Occupation: Trade union official
- Known for: Leading strikes
- Spouse: Duncan Beaton

Catherine McLean known as Kate McLean and later Kate Beaton (6 January 1879 – 21 October 1960) was a British trade unionist and councillor in Glasgow. She led the National Federation of Women Workers (NFWW) and several disputes including the six-month-long networkers strike in Kilbirnie in 1913.

== Life ==
McLean was born in Glasgow in 1879. She was the fourth of six children and she attended school until the age of twelve. She began her association with socialist causes when she joined the Women's Labour League. The following year she was in the National Federation of Women Workers (NFWW). She was one of their delegates to the important Glasgow Trades Council. In 1911 she was one of the first six women to attend the Scottish Trades Union Congress in Dundee as delegates (rather than wives). She was involved with the STUC until 1914 when she married.

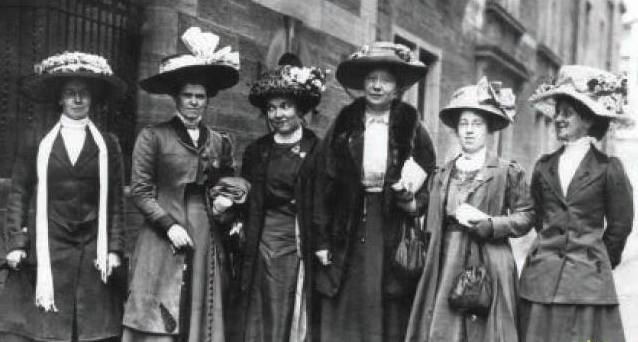
STUC delegates in 1911 in Dundee: L-R Jeanie Spence, Mrs Lamont, Agnes Brown, Mary Macarthur, Kate McLean and Rachel Devine

The cotton-thread workers of Neilston struck on 25 May 1910 and McLean and Esther Dick quickly signed up the strikers into the NFWW. The strike grew as the employers were unwilling to talk to the NFWW and by June it was a lock-out with hundreds of new (striking) NFWW members. The strike was important as it was the first time that the workers had moved away from paternalistic employers towards a union to support them.

She was again involved when the NFWW supported the 1911 strike at the Vale of Leven dyeworks at the United Turkey Red Company. This was a major dispute for this Alexandria company and there was some violence. The NFWW were already active there but they attracted many more members. By January they had 600 members and by February 1911 there were 2,000. The NFWW's policy was to try and steer these new members into existing unions where they would be accepted. These high numbers allowed the NFWW to apply pressure to the National Amalgamated Society of Dyers, Bleachers, Finishers and Kindred Trade and the women were accepted as members.

She was a leader too at the 1913 networkers' strike in Kilbirnie which was agreed at an NFWW meeting in late March. It lasted from April to September 1913 and it was the longest recorded strike of women workers at that time. The strike enjoyed community support and in May there was a meeting in Kilbirnie where 10,000 supporters were present. The NFWW welcomed the attention and McLean signed up 200 new members at the nearby Nobels’ dynamite factory in Ardeer, North Ayrshire. The networkers dispute was resolved on 2 September 1913. McLean gave the closing speech and noted that it was the union who had improved wages and working conditions.

She married in 1914 and it was as Kate Beaton that she was elected unopposed for the Hutchisontown ward as a Glasgow councillor. She kept that position until 1949 when she retired from the position.

McLean died in 1960 in Glasgow.
