= Charles Latham, 1st Baron Latham =

British politician

The Right Honourable The Lord Latham
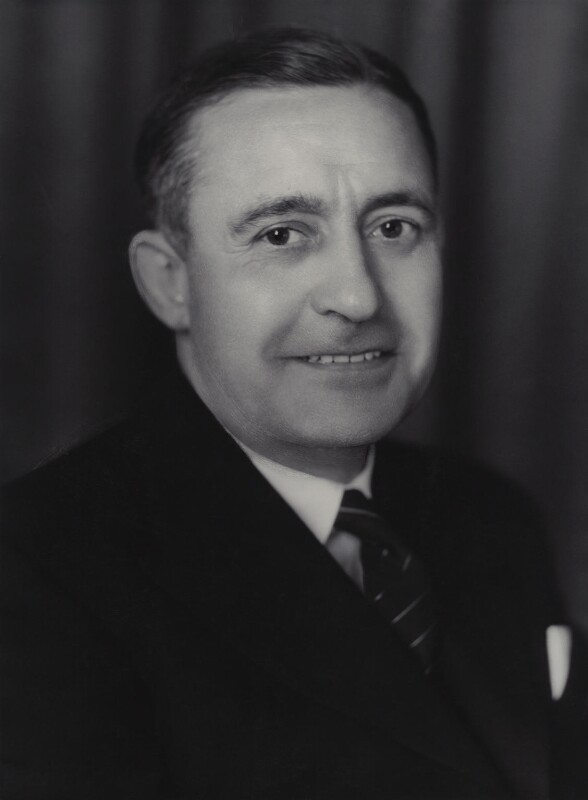

Leader of London County Council
- In office 1940–1947
- Preceded by: Herbert Morrison
- Succeeded by: Isaac Hayward

Personal details
- Born: Charles Lathan; 26 December 1888 Norwich
- Died: 31 March 1970 (aged 81) London
- Occupation: Politician

Charles Latham, 1st Baron Latham (1888–1970) was a British politician and Leader of the London County Council from 1940 to 1947.

== Early life and career ==
Latham was born with the surname Lathan in Norwich, and changed his name in order to distinguish himself from his elder brother, who also had a political career. He worked as a Railway Clerk there, and later moved to London where he became involved in Trade Union activities. He helped to form the London Labour Party in 1914, and was President of the National Union of Clerks in 1916. During World War I he fought in France with the Royal Sussex Regiment.

== Elected office ==
Latham had retrained as an accountant and continued his involvement in London politics, fighting the general elections of 1922 and 1923 in Hendon. His administrative skill and knowledge of transport issues led to his selection as a County Alderman on the London County Council in 1928. This brought him into close contact with Herbert Morrison, the Labour Leader on the LCC and Minister of Transport in the Labour government from 1929. Latham was a strong personal supporter of Morrison with whom he agreed on most issues (especially financial orthodoxy), and with Morrison's support, he was elected again to the London Executive.

In the 1934 election Latham gave up his seat as an Alderman for an elected Councillor at Hackney South, again using Morrison's influence (Morrison had been Mayor and MP for Hackney). Labour won a majority and Latham was appointed as Chair of the Finance Committee, which both Morrison and Latham agreed should make sure that taxation was kept as low as possible. This work was seen to be successful when Labour were re-elected in 1937.

On 16 January 1942 he was created Baron Latham, of Hendon in the County of Middlesex.

When Morrison was appointed to the Government in the wartime Coalition, he chose Latham as his successor as leader of the council. He was elected leader of the Council in May 1940. The circumstances of the time made civil defence of London the top priority for the council, and normal party politics were suspended. The council had a large share of the responsibility for Air Raid Precautions (it ran the Fire Service and the Ambulance Service) and it was the biggest hospital authority in the country. Latham took the chairmanship of the Civil Defence Committee for himself.

However, Latham did not ignore political issues during the war. He instigated a Labour Party inquiry into the structure of London government for the post-war period, which was an attempt to settle and justify his preferred policy of creating a Greater London Authority covering a much wider area. This was a highly controversial policy within the party, and two members of the committee drawing up the report voted against it, with four others unable to agree on the distribution of powers between various local government bodies.

After the end of the war Latham won the 1946 election in a landslide, following other large Labour victories at the General election and in municipal elections. However his relationship with the Labour group deteriorated with many complaints about lack of consultation and excessive discipline. Although this was characteristic of all Labour leaders of the LCC, Latham did not have the personality or the stature to overcome it. On 15 July 1947, Latham announced his resignation 'for personal reasons'. It is often held to be significant that his successor, Isaac Hayward, was one of those who had voted against his plan for a Greater London Authority, and Hayward's Chief Whip was the other.

He appears in the film The Proud City discussing the Abercrombie plans for the redevelopment of London after the war.

== London Transport Executive ==
Latham had served on the London Passenger Transport Board (LPTB) since 1935, and, within a month of his resignation as Leader of the LCC, his appointment as chairman of the London Transport Executive (LTE), which was to replace the LPTB from 1 January 1948, was announced by the Labour Government on 20 August 1947. Latham's appointment had been predicted in a House of Commons debate on the Transport Act on 24 July by MP Henry Strauss, and the coincidence of these two events provoked considerable comment and suggestions of a fix, but the Minister for Transport denied that he had had any contact with Latham.

Lord Ashfield, chairman of the outgoing LPTB, resigned the post on 31 October 1947, and Latham filled the role temporarily until the Board was abolished at the end of that year. As chairman of the LTE, Latham welcomed in London's last tram in the early hours of 6 July 1952. Latham served as Chairman for six years.

== Later career ==
He was made a peer from 1942 (when he was LCC Leader) and held public appointments later on the Metropolitan Water Board and the Standing Advisory Committee on Pay of the Higher Civil Service. He was Lord Lieutenant of Middlesex from 1945 to 1956.

He died in London in 1970, at the age of 81. His probate was sworn that year at £19,584 (equivalent to about £270,000 in 2025). His usual address was given as in Montagu Square, Marylebone.

== Personal life ==
Charles Latham was married twice.

Firstly, to Maya Helen Allman, on 14 June 1913. They were later divorced. They had four children:

- Francis Charles Allman Latham b. 24 Jan 1917, d. Nov 1959
- Barbara Wendy Latham b. 7 Jan 1920
- Jean Helen Latham b. 17 Jul 1921
- Diana Dorothy Latham b. 18 Sep 1925.

On 28 March 1957 he married Sylvia May Kennard (died 1985).

== Arms ==
Coat of arms of Charles Latham, 1st Baron Latham
Crest Two spurs one in bend the other in bend sinister rowels upwards Or straps Sable with buckles Gold. Escutcheon Per fess Gules and Chequy Or and Sable a fess barry wavy Argent and Azure in chief a seax fesswise point to the sinister cutting edge upwards Proper pommel and hilt of the second ensigned with a Saxon crown of the second. Supporters On either side a horse Sable charged on the shoulder with a plate and gorged with a mural coronet with a chain reflexed over the back Or. Motto Bene Est Tentare

Political offices
Preceded by Herbert Morrison	Leader of the London County Council; 1940–1947	Succeeded by Isaac Hayward
Preceded by Samuel Gluckstein	Chairman of the Finance Committee of London County Council; 1934–1940	Succeeded by Francis Douglas
Trade union offices
Preceded by John Lindsley	President of the National Union of Clerks; 1916–1918	Succeeded by James McKinlay
Business positions
Preceded by Lord Ashfield	Chairman (Pro tempore), London Passenger Transport Board; 1 November 1947 – 31 December 1947	Abolished
New post	Chairman, London Transport Executive; 1948–1953	Succeeded by Sir John Elliot
Honorary titles
Preceded by The Lord Rochdale	Lord Lieutenant of Middlesex; 1945–1956	Succeeded by Frederick Handley Page
Peerage of the United Kingdom
New creation	Baron Latham; 1942–1970	Succeeded by Dominic Latham
