= National Union of Wallcoverings, Decorative and Allied Trades =

Former trade union of the United Kingdom

- Predecessor: Wallpaper Stainers' Trade Union Federation
- Merged into: National Graphical Association
- Founded: 1919
- Dissolved: 1 October 1979
- Headquarters: 223 Bury New Road, Whitefield
- Location: United Kingdom
- Members: 4,700 (1975)
- Key people: Charles Kean (Gen Sec)
- Publication: Decor
- Affiliations: TUC, GFTU

The National Union of Wallcoverings, Decorative and Allied Trades (NUWDAT) was an industrial union representing workers connected with the manufacture of wallpaper in the United Kingdom.

== History ==
The origins of the union lay in the Wallpaper Stainers' Trade Union Federation, founded in 1917 by Charles Kean of the Amalgamated Union of Engravers to Calico Printers and Paper Stainers. Two years later, two other members of the federation, the Amalgamated Society of Machine Paper Stainers and Colour Mixers of Great Britain and the Paper Stainers' Union of General Workers, agreed to merge, forming the Wallpaper Workers' Union (WPWU). The Engravers' members in the wallpaper industry appear also to have joined, and Kean resigned as secretary of that union in 1920; its remaining members, concentrated in the cotton industry, became the United Society of Engravers of Great Britain and Ireland.

The new union was also joined by the London Paperstainers' Trade Union and Benevolent Society, which appears to have become the core of the Wallpaper Blockprinters' Trade Union, a small union affiliated to the WPWU. The Wallpaper Blockprinters, the WPWU, and the Print Block, Roller and Stamp Cutters' Society continued to work together in the Wallpaper Stainers' Trade Union Federation and also the Wallpaper Makers' Industrial Council. This council-based strategy of negotiations with employers and avoidance of industrial action became central to the WPWU under Kean's leadership, and that of his successor, Cecil Heap.

From the start, the WPWU represented workers in both the handmade and factory-production parts of the wallpaper industry; over time, it also recruited clerical staff and supervisors. Membership was fairly constant, from just under 3,000 in 1927, to 2,000 in the 1930s, peaking at 4,700 in 1975, then falling to 3,820 by 1979.

The collapse of the Trade Union Federation in 1951 gradually brought about a change in strategy. The Wallpaper Blockprinters was merged in to the WPWU in 1966, the same year that Duncan McIntosh became general secretary, and the Print, Block, Roller and Stamp Cutters' Society merged in 1969. In 1971, he attempted to attract more non-manual workers by creating their own affiliated union, the Wallcoverings Staff Association, but this never attracted enough members to be sustainable, and rejoined the union in 1975, which then changed its name to the "National Union of Wallcoverings, Decorative and Allied Trades". However, McIntosh resigned in 1974, following a censure vote by the union's Darwen branch.

By the 1970s, the union was considering a merger with a larger union, either Society of Lithographic Artists, Designers and Engravers or the National Graphical Association (NGA). In the end, it merged into the NGA in 1979.

== General Secretaries ==
1919: Charles Kean
1935: Cecil Heap
1967: Duncan McIntosh
1974: Bob Tomlins
