= Gawain Little =

British trade union leader (born 1980)

Gawain Robert Little (born 28 May 1980) is a British trade union leader.

Little grew up in Toxteth, Liverpool, in the early 1980s, leaving Liverpool in 1998 to study mathematics at St John’s College, Oxford University.

Whilst at university, Little was involved in the national campaign against Tuition Fees. From 2002-2011, Little was a National Council member of the Campaign for Nuclear Disarmament.

Having worked as a teaching assistant before completing his PGCE , he became a schoolteacher in 2004. He joined the National Union of Teachers (NUT), and became a workplace rep on his first day as a teacher.

Little was President of Oxford & District Trade Union Council from 2009 and, from 2010, Chair of Oxfordshire Anti-Cuts Alliance. In 2012, he was elected Secretary Oxfordshire NUT. The same year, he was elected to the union's national executive.

On the national executive, Little served on the International and Professional Unity Committees, as well as Education and Equalities, Organising and Membership, and Salaries and Superannuation Committees. In 2014, he was elected chair of the Professional Unity committee and, in this role, was involved in negotiating the amalgamation between NUT and ATL to create the new National Education Union.

Following the creation of the National Education Union, Little became chair of its international committee. From 2018 to 2023, he taught in primary schools in Norwich.

Little is a prominent member of the Communist Party of Britain, who served a term as general secretary of the Young Communist League. From 2019 to 2023, he served as editor of the Education for Tomorrow journal. He is a trustee of the National Education Museum and was for a long time an officer of Unify – the campaign for one education union. In 2021, he stood to become deputy general secretary of the NEU, taking second place in the election.

Little has written widely on education and trade unionism, including two edited collections –- Global Education Reform: Building resistance and solidarity and Beyond the Blockade: Education in Cuba (with Malcolm Richards, Aretha Green and Phil Yeeles). His most recent book is Lessons in Organising: What Trade Unionists Can Learn from the War on Teachers (with Ellie Sharp, Howard Stevenson and David Wilson).

In 2023, Little was elected as general secretary of the General Federation of Trade Unions.

Party political offices
Preceded by ?	General Secretary of the Young Communist League; 2003–2006	Succeeded by Ben Stevenson
Trade union offices
Preceded by Doug Nicholls	General Secretary of the General Federation of Trade Unions; 2023–present	Succeeded by Incumbent
