= Doug Nicholls (trade unionist) =

British trade union leader and writer (born 1956)

Douglas Nicholls (born 1956) is a British trade union leader and writer.

Nicholls was a part-time youth worker in Oxford in 1975, when he joined the Community and Youth Workers' Union (CYWU). In 1982, he moved to Coventry to work full-time in the field, and in 1987 he was elected as general secretary of the CYWU.

He was Secretary of the Coventry Trade Union Council 1984-1994 and the Secretary of the Coventry Miners' Support Committee during the miners' strike of 1984–85.

In 2007, Nicholls took the CYWU into a merger with the Transport and General Workers Union (TGWU); a few months later, the TGWU became part of Unite the Union, and Nicholls served as a national secretary of Unite until 2011.

Nicholls was elected to the Executive of the General Federation of Trade Unions in 1995 and served as its President from 2007 until 2009. He was elected as the Federation's General Secretary in 2012.

He became Chair of the national Chooseyouth campaign in 2011. This is an organisation composed of most youth service related organisations and young people's groups that campaigns for a statutory Youth Service.

In 2015, Nicholls became the first chair of Trade Unionists Against the European Union.

In 2021 he was elected as the first Chair of Rebuild Britain. www.rebuildbritain.org.uk.

== Selected book publications ==
- The Dance of Death, with illustrations by Tim Holman. Quatrain poems. 1979.
- Speaking Tools, Poems 1975-2005.
- Health and Safety in Youth and Community Work.
- Managing Violence and Aggression in Youth and Community Work.
- The EU: Bad for Britain - A Trade Union View. Bread Books. December 2005. ISBN 978-0954211257.
- For Youth Workers and Youth Work: speaking out for a better future. Bristol: Policy Press. May 2012. doi:10.2307/j.ctt1t6p78b. ISBN 978-1847428707.
- Lugalbanda, Lover of the Seed. Version with notes of a Sumerian poem. Manifesto Press.
- Editor: Workers' PlayTime, seven scripts from seven struggles. Selected plays about key moments in trade union history with an introduction.
- Advisor: For the Many Not the Few, A History of Britain Shaped by the People.
- Link contributor: Trade Union Education, Transforming the World.

Trade union offices
Preceded by Keith Bell	General Secretary of the Community and Youth Workers' Union; 1987 – 2007	Succeeded by Position abolished
Preceded by Garry Oakes	Chair of the General Federation of Trade Unions; 2007 – 2009	Succeeded by Joe Marino
Preceded by Michael Bradley	General Secretary of the General Federation of Trade Unions; 2012 – 2023	Succeeded by Gawain Little
