= George Bell (trade unionist) =

British trade unionist

George Bell (25 October 1878 – 20 February 1959) was a British trade union leader, who served as general secretary of the General Federation of Trade Unions (GFTU).

Bell worked in an iron foundry in his hometown of Nottingham. In 1898, he joined the Friendly Society of Iron Founders (FSIF), and he soon became active on Nottingham Trades Council, and in the Labour Party. He first stood for Nottingham City Council in 1907.

Bell became known as a strong speaker, and he became increasingly prominent in the FSIF. In 1911, he moved a resolution that the union should appoint full-time organisers. This was passed, and he secured one of the first positions. He later became the union's assistant general secretary. He was noted for his anti-German attitude during World War I, stating that Britain should "wipe the Germans out". In 1920, the union merged into the new National Union of Foundry Workers, and Bell left in 1922 to work for the GFTU.

Bell became the GFTU's first full-time organiser, travelling the country to negotiate with employers and between unions, and trying to gain the federation new affiliates. He proved unsuccessful at increasing membership, but he became popular with the unions affiliated to the GFTU, and was considered to be especially sympathetic to their officials, and he increasingly took over policy work from the general secretary, William A. Appleton. In 1938, Appleton retired, and Bell was elected unopposed as his replacement. The GFTU had stagnated under Appleton's leadership, and had increasingly come to represent smaller, craft unions. Bell saw the union through World War II, with a reduced staff and little input from member unions. The expansion of the welfare state after the war removed most of the GFTU's role in providing insurance coverage to workers. The organisation only survived the 1940s after it was determined that, if it was dissolved, founder members which had long since left would be entitled to a share of its substantial reserves.

Bell was nearly 70 by 1947, when the GFTU changed its rules to state that its general secretary must retire, and would receive a pension, from that age. But the uncertainty over whether the organisation would dissolve led the management council to repeatedly ask him to defer his retirement. As he and his wife had become the guardian of a young, orphaned, granddaughter, he was happy to continue, and from 1950 he tentatively introduced some new initiatives: joint campaigns with the Trades Union Congress, and from 1951, the quarterly Federation News in 1951.

In 1951, the management council appointed Harry Earnshaw to take over from Bell, but Earnshaw withdrew, and Bell continued in post. Leslie Hodgson was appointed as assistant general secretary in 1952, with a promise that, if his work was satisfactory that he would be promoted two years later, but Bell announced that he did not want an assistant and no longer wished to retire. Despite this, his health became increasingly poor, and early in 1953, he was persuaded to take a six-month leave of absence. At the end of the period, he was finally persuaded to retire. He died six years later.

Trade union offices
Preceded by William A. Appleton	General Secretary of the General Federation of Trade Unions; 1938–1953	Succeeded by Leslie Hodgson
