= General Union of Loom Overlookers =

Former trade union of the United Kingdom

- Predecessor: National Confederate Association of Power Loom Overlookers
- Founded: 17 May 1885
- Dissolved: 2007
- Headquarters: Blackburn
- Location: United Kingdom
- Members: 5,176 (1907); 8,820 (1933); 2,410 (1979)
- Affiliations: GFTU, Labour, NCTTF, TUC, UTFWA

The General Union of Loom Overlookers (GULO) was a trade union representing junior supervisors in textile manufacturing in the United Kingdom. While most members were based in Lancashire, it also had members in Yorkshire, East Anglia and Essex.

== History ==
In 1875, a National Confederate Association of Power Loom Overlookers was established as a loose organisation of sixteen local trade unions, most based in Lancashire. As all its affiliates were very small, its total membership was around 1,000. In 1885, it organised a conference with the larger Blackburn and Pendleton unions, which saw themselves as friendly societies and had refused to join the confederation. The conference was successful, and the General Union of Associations of Power-Loom Overlookers was established. It took part in a large number of local strikes in its early years.

Affiliates included:

Union	Founded	Affiliated	Membership (1907)	Notes
Accrington and District	1878	1885	121	Dissolved 1982
Ashton-under-Lyne and District	1872	1885	174	Merged into Hyde and District 1961
Bacup and District	1907	1907	83	Merged into Haslingden and District 1964
Bamber Bridge	1879	1885	76	Merged into Preston and Districts 1918
Blackburn and District	1850	1885	350	
Bolton and District	1871	1885	339	Merged into United Association 1984
Burnley and District	1884	1885	571	Dissolved 1974
Bury and District	1892		143	
Chorley and District	1878	1885	184	Merged into Preston and Districts 1973
Church and Oswaldtwistle	1867	1908	77	Merged into Great Harwood 1960
Clitheroe	c.1930		N/A	
Colne and District	1883		285	Merged into EETPU 1991
Darwen and District	1858		1,325	Dissolved 1960s
Derby	1937	1937	N/A	Merged into United Association 1978
Glossop	1875	1885	N/A	Merged into Hadfield 1901
Hadfield and District	1886	1893	120	Merged into Hyde 1976
Haslingden and District	1890		101	Merged into EETPU 1990
Heywood and District	1868	1893	81	Dissolved 1982
Hyde and District	1872	1885	108	
Leigh	1893	1893	56	Merged into Bolton 1973
Longridge and District	1888	1888	45	Merged into Preston and Districts 1966
National	1865	1885	581	Merged into EETPU 1990
Nelson and District	1889		513	Merged into EETPU 1989
Oldham	1870	1885	195	Merged into United Association 1990
Preston and Districts	1875	1885	665	Merged into Blackburn and District 1988
Radcliffe and District	1875	1893	89	Dissolved 1972
Skipton and District	1896	1896	102	
Stalybridge and District	1871	1885	88	Dissolved 1976
United	1887		535	Dissolved 1997
Wigan	1880s	1885		Merged into EETPU 1990

The union was keen to support broader trade union ventures. It was a founder member of the Labour Representation Committee, and affiliated to the United Textile Factory Workers' Association, the General Federation of Trade Unions and the Trades Union Congress. It was also a founder member of the Northern Counties Textile Trades Federation.

Early in the 1900s, the association changed its name to become the General Union of Associations of Loom Overlookers. Membership continued to grow until 1933, when it peaked at 8,820. It remained steady at around 5,000 until 1960, at which point 25 unions were affiliated. However, membership then began to fall, in line with the decline in the British cotton industry. In response, in 1971, the union founded the "British Federation of Textile Technicians" with two smaller, independent unions: the Yorkshire Association of Power Loom Overlookers and the Scottish Union of Power Loom Overlookers.

By 1979, the union consisted of fourteen local unions, although their total membership was only 2,410. It suffered a dramatic loss of membership as mills closed during the 1980s and 1990s, with only 265 members remaining at the end of the century. By 1997, it had only two affiliates, the United Association of Power Loom Overlookers and the Amalgamated Power Loom Overlookers, and that year its federal structure was abandoned, members instead joining the central body, now renamed the "General Union of Loom Overlookers". Despite this change, membership continued to drop, falling to only 138 in 2007, when the union was dissolved. Former members of the union transferred to the GMB.

== General Secretaries ==
1885: John Sidebotham
1905: James E. Tattersall
1913: James E. Tattersall and Edward Duxbury
1921: Edward Duxbury
1935: Jeremiah Proctor
1949: Fred Titherington
1963: Arthur Howcroft
1976: Harold Brown
1982: R. Richardson
1986: Eddie Macro
1990: Don Rishton
