= National Association of Licensed House Managers =

The National Association of Licensed house Managers (NALHM) was a trade union representing publicans in the United Kingdom.

The union was founded in 1970, in response to a growing trend of breweries purchasing public houses and then employing managers to run them. It affiliated to the General Federation of Trade Unions and to the Trades Union Congress, and by 1996 had 7,109 members. In 1997, it merged into the Transport and General Workers' Union.

== General Secretaries ==
1970: Harry Shindler
1990s: Peter Love
