= Federation of International Civil Servants' Associations =

FICSA
- Federation of International Civil Servants' Associations
- Founded: 1952
- Headquarters: Geneva, Switzerland
- Location: United Nations
- President: Imed Zabaar
- General Secretary: Cristina Pierini
- Key people: Imed Zabaar, President; Cristina Pierini, General Secretary; Anita Stefin, Treasurer
- Affiliations: Staff Federations of the United Nations
- Website: www.ficsa.org

The Federation of International Civil Servants’ Associations (FICSA) was founded in Paris in 1952. Its earliest members were the Staff Associations of the United Nations, New York; the European Office of the United Nations, Geneva; UNESCO; ICAO; WHO; WMO and the Staff Union of the ILO. FICSA has since expanded to a federated group of 30 staff associations/unions belonging to the United Nations common system with full membership status; 18 staff associations/unions outside the UN common system as associate members; 19 staff associations/unions as consultative members and 27 Federations of United Nations Staff Associations (FUNSA) as observers. While its members are diverse, they all have many workplace issues in common (performance management, workplace conflict, industrial relations, contractual arrangements, benefits and entitlements, training and career development, staff well-being, access to grievance mechanisms, diversity and inclusion, recruitment and selection policies, equity and fairness in the application of policies, organizational changes, downsizing, outsourcing, etc.) and can benefit from the exchanges of information and ideas, updates on employment trends and best practices, a wide range of workshops and training and direct advice and support provided by the Federation at the local as well as global level.

There are three labour or staff federations serving unions and staff associations in the UN system, the other organisations being CCISUA and UNISERV.

== Goals ==
FICSA seeks to foster the development of international civil servants in accordance with the principles set forth in the United Nations Charter and the constitutions of the specialized agencies.

The Federation does so by:

- Defending staff rights
- Ensuring that equitable conditions of service for all common system staff are maintained at a level which will ensure the recruitment and retention of the most qualified people
- Contributing to building a positive image of the international civil service

== Structure ==
Much like other international organizations, FICSA operates under a set of statutes that determine its administrative bodies and rules of procedure. The main bodies in FICSA are the Council, the Executive Committee, and the Standing Committees. FICSA is supported by a permanent secretariat based in Palais des Nations, Geneva.

=== Council ===
The Council consists of member association/union representatives and meets annually to define the Federation’s policy and elect the Executive Committee as well as four regional representatives.

=== Executive Committee and Regional Representatives ===
The Executive Committee and the regional representatives are responsible for implementing the Federation’s policies and representing the Federation at all high-level meetings dealing with all facets of staff employment conditions and human resources policy issues. It also draws up the annual program of work, based on the decisions and recommendations adopted by the Council.

==== Executive committee ====
- President (Imed Zabaar)
- General Secretary (Cristina Pierini)
- Treasurer (Anita Stefin)
- Members for Compensation Issues (Silvia Mariangeloni and Simone Grego)
- Member for Regional and Field Issues (Oleksandr Martynenko)
- Member without Portfolio (Steven-Geoffrey Eales)

==== Regional Representatives ====
- Africa – Christian Stéphane Tounta
- America – Glenda Lopez
- Asia – Jean-Michel Pedroso
- Europe – Maria Del Rocio Martin Vargas
- MENASC (Middle East, North Africa and Arabic-speaking Countries) – Mina Nagy

==== Standing Committees ====
There are eight standing committees whose officers are elected annually by the FICSA Council specializing in:

- Conditions of Service in the Field
- General Service Questions
- Human Resources Management
- Legal Questions
- Professional Salaries and Allowances
- Staff/Management Relations
- Social Security/OHS
- Programme, Budget, Administration and Strategy
