= Bill Whatley (trade unionist) =

British trade unionist

William Henry Potts Whatley OBE (16 December 1922 – 4 September 1997) was a British trade union leader.

== Early life ==
Whatley attended Gosforth Secondary School before briefly becoming a clerk with the Co-operative Wholesale Society. The following year, World War II broke out, and Whatley served with the Royal Air Force.

After the war, Whatley joined the Union of Shop, Distributive and Allied Workers (USDAW), becoming a full-time area organiser in Bristol in 1948. He was promoted to National Officer in 1966 and Chief Organising Officer in 1976, becoming third most senior official in the union.

In 1979, USDAW's general secretary, Alf Allen, stood down, and Whatley defeated John Dilks to succeed Allen. As general secretary, he also served on the General Council of the Trades Union Congress (TUC), and on the TUC's Economic Committee. He retired in 1985, and was made an Officer of the Order of the British Empire the following year.

Trade union offices
Preceded by Alf Allen	General Secretary of the Union of Shop, Distributive and Allied Workers; 1979 – 1985	Succeeded by Garfield Davies
Preceded by Alf Allen and Doug Grieve	Food, Drink, etc. Group representative on the General Council of the TUC; 1979 – 1983; With: Doug Grieve	Succeeded by Council restructured
