= Bakers, Food and Allied Workers' Union =

UK trade union

BFAWU
- Bakers, Food and Allied Workers' Union
- Founded: 1847; 179 years ago
- Headquarters: Stanborough House, Great North Road, Welwyn Garden City
- Location: United Kingdom
- Members: ▲14,645 (2024)
- General Secretary: Sarah Woolley
- Affiliations: Labour Party (1902–2021), TUC, GFTU, STUC, TUCG, ICTU, IUF
- Website: www.bfawu.org

The Bakers, Food and Allied Workers' Union (BFAWU) is a trade union in the United Kingdom that represents workers in the food industry. The BFAWU was founded in 1847 in Manchester.

The BFAWU is currently led by Sarah Woolley.

== History ==
The union dates its origin to 1847. The Manchester Friendly Association of Operative Bakers was established in 1849, and by 1854 it was led by Thomas Hodson. Under his leadership the union first expanded to represent bakers in Salford, becoming the first bakers' union in England to cover a wide area, though its membership remained below 200. In 1861 Hodson led the formation of the Amalgamated Union of Operative Bakers, bringing together unions in Bristol, Cheltenham, Hanley, Liverpool, London, Newcastle, Warrington and Wigan, along with his Manchester society. The new union gained prominence when its campaign for improvements in working conditions led to the Bakehouse Regulations Act 1863.

In about 1870 the union relocated its headquarters to London, but the majority of its members were still in Lancashire. Other unions gradually joined, including the South Wales Federation of Journeymen Bakers in 1893. By 1891 the union had 4,000 members, nearly half of them in London. In 1902, the union officially affiliated to the Labour Party, which had been founded two years prior.

For many years the union did not admit workers whom it considered unskilled. This led its London organiser, C. Mann, to form the rival National Union of Bakery Trade Workers in 1913. The following year the Operative Bakers agreed to accept all workers in the industry, and renamed itself as the Amalgamated Union of Operative Bakers, Confectioners and Allied Workers of Great Britain and Ireland. Mann's breakaway union was dissolved. In 1920 the union agreed to transfer its members in the milling industry to the rival Dock, Wharf and Riverside Workers' Union.

The union focused its campaigns on shorter working hours, better pay and working conditions. In 1919 it led a major strike against night work, but this was unsuccessful. It recruited well in cooperative bakeries, but struggled elsewhere, until the Second World War. In 1935 it barred master bakers from holding office in the union.

The union became more centralised in the 1950s. In 1964 it shortened its name to become the Bakers' Union. This was later lengthened to the present name.

=== Modern history ===
In July 2015 the BFAWU endorsed Jeremy Corbyn's campaign in the Labour Party leadership election.

In 2017 members of the BFAWU staged the first strikes at McDonald's in the UK.

During the Labour Party leadership election in 2020 the union backed Rebecca Long-Bailey. It also backed Richard Burgon for deputy leader.

In November 2020 the union announced that it planned to consult its members on whether to remain affiliated to the Labour Party following the suspension of former party leader Jeremy Corbyn. In September 2021 it announced during Labour's annual conference that it would disaffiliate from the party, citing dissatisfaction with Keir Starmer's leadership.

In 2023, the Solidarity Across Land Trades union (SALT) became an affiliate of the BFAWU.

== Solidarity Across Land Trades ==
Solidarity Across Land Trades (SALT) is a trade union representing land-based workers such as those working in agriculture, horticulture, floriculture, forestry, and conservation. The union has been affiliated to the BFAWU since 2023.

In 2025, SALT and the BFAWU published a report on the conditions of those working in agroecology.

== Leadership ==
=== General secretaries ===
1864: Thomas Hodson
1883: John Jenkins
1915: John William Banfield
1940: Joseph Thomasson
1952: Jock Halliday
1968: Stanley Gretton
1975: Sam Maddox
1979: Joe Marino
2010: Ronnie Draper
2020: Sarah Woolley

=== Presidents ===
1910: A. F. Bentley
1914: J. H. Brown
1926: T. Ferris
1927: H. Keen
1946: Ernest Haynes
1969: Chris Childs
1977: Terry O'Neill
1995: Dennis Nash
2000: Ronnie Draper
2010: Ian Hodson

== Election results ==
The union sponsored Labour Party candidates in several Parliamentary elections, winning twice.

Election	Constituency	Candidate	Votes	Percentage	Position
1922 general election	Fulham West	Robert Mark Gentry	8,210	35.6	2
1932 by-election	Wednesbury	William Banfield	21,977	54.7	1
1935 general election	Wednesbury	William Banfield	22,683	53.3	1
