= Amalgamated Society of Operative Lace Makers and Auxiliary Workers =

Former trade union of the United Kingdom

The Amalgamated Society of Operative Lace Makers and Auxiliary Workers, also known as the Lace Makers' Society, was a trade union representing laceworkers in England.

== History ==
The union was formed in 1874, when the Curtain Lace Trades Society merged with the Levers Lace Trades Society and the Plain Net Trade Society; for many years, the union remained divided into three branches, based on the former societies. It was originally named the Amalgamated Society of Operative Lace Makers, and it saw itself as a revival of the Lacemakers' Union, a short-lived society which had affiliated to the National Association for the Protection of Labour in 1831.

Most of the union's members were in Nottingham and, in the 1890s, it was the largest member of the Nottingham and District Lace Trade Unions Federation. In 1896, the union's general secretary was sacked after he was involved in fraud. He was replaced by William A. Appleton, who ran the union in the style of a guild, with admission fees of up to £15 and benefits including two saloon bars in Nottingham exclusively for members' use, and loans of up to £200 available in order for members to set up their own businesses. Appleton also founded the International Lacemakers' Federation, and affiliated the union to the General Federation of Trade Unions, of which he later became secretary.

Over time, the lace industry became established elsewhere in England, and the union absorbed the Bulwell society, and set up new branches in Beeston, Ilkeston, Southwell and Chard. Membership peaked at 3,361 in 1900, then gradually fell, as the Workers' Union set up rival laceworkers' sections. By 1933, its membership was down to 1,500, but was boosted when the Auxiliary Society of Male Lace Workers and Female Lace Workers' Society merged into it; it adopted a new name as the "Amalgamated Society of Operative Lace Makers and Auxiliary Workers".

In 1963, the union became the Amalgamated Society of Operative Lace Makers and Textile Workers, and the membership decline levelled off, leaving it with 1,200 members by the end of the decade. In 1971, it merged into the National Union of Hosiery and Knitwear Workers.

== General Secretaries ==
1876: G. Marriott
1879: S. Varney
1896: William A. Appleton
1907: Charles Wardle
1928: J. T. Severn
1950: J. E. Flewitt
