= Amalgamated Union of Asphalt Workers =

British trade union

- Merged into: Transport and General Workers' Union
- Founded: 1938
- Dissolved: 1987
- Headquarters: Jenkin House, Queen's Road, Peckham
- Location: United Kingdom
- Members: 2,680 (1980)
- Key people: F. V. Jenkin; Harry Wareham
- Affiliations: TUC, GFTU, NFBTO

The Amalgamated Union of Asphalt Workers (AUAW) was a trade union representing workers in the asphalt industry in the United Kingdom.

The union was founded in 1938 with the merger of the National Asphalt Workers' Union and the Northern Asphalt Workers' Union. Although its membership was always small, it covered the entirety of Great Britain and workers involved in all aspects of asphalt, from manufacture to construction workers.

In 1980, the union had 2,680 members. In 1988, it merged into the Transport and General Workers' Union.

== General Secretaries ==
1938: F. V. Jenkin
1950s: Herbert Softley
1960s: Harry M. Wareham
1986: Derek McCann

== Assistant General Secretaries ==
1960s: Tony (Antonio) Avella
1970s: Derek McCann
