= Alex Hutchison =

Scottish trade union leader

Alexander Hutchison (1864 – 1928) was a Scottish trade union leader who served as chair of the General Federation of Trade Unions (GFTU).

Born in Falkirk, Hutchison began working at the age of eight, later becoming an iron moulder. An early member of the National Union of Stove Grate and General Metal Workers, he became secretary of his local branch in 1893. He also joined the Independent Labour Party, and became a vocal advocate of women's suffrage.

In 1908, Hutchison became a full-time organiser for the Stove Grate Workers, and then in 1909 was elected as the union's general secretary. Relocated to Rotherham, he became active in the local Labour Party, being elected to the town council in 1916, and chairing the local Labour Party from 1918. Also in 1918, he was elected as chair of the National Federation of Foundry Unions, and in 1921 he was elected to the Management Committee of the GFTU.

Hutchison served as chair of the GFTU from 1926 to 1928, when he died suddenly.

Trade union offices
Preceded by William Knowles	General Secretary of the National Union of Stove Grate and General Metal Workers; 1909–1928	Succeeded by Adam Bennett
Preceded by Fred Birchenough	Chair of the General Federation of Trade Unions; 1926–1928	Succeeded by John Sime
