= Joint Committee of Light Metal Trades Unions =

Former trade union of the United Kingdom

- Founded: 1911
- Headquarters: Imperial Buildings, Rotherham
- Location: United Kingdom

The Joint Committee of Light Metal Trades Unions (LMTU) was a trade union committee consisting of unions based in the United Kingdom with members involved in producing castings for industry and construction.

The committee was established in 1911, as the Joint Committee of the Light Castings Trade Unions, adopting its final name in about 1930. It negotiated with the National Metal Trades Federation, which represented companies which produced castings.

The committee was based in Rotherham, sharing its offices and general secretary with the National Union of Domestic Appliance and General Metal Workers.

By the 1980s, the committee had the following members:

- Amalgamated Society of Boilermakers, Shipwrights, Blacksmiths and Structural Workers
- Amalgamated Union of Engineering Workers (Engineering, Foundry and TASS sections)
- Association of Patternmakers and Allied Craftsmen
- Association of Professional, Executive, Clerical and Computer Staff
- National Union of Domestic Appliance and General Metal Workers
- National Union of Sheet Metal Workers, Coppersmiths and Heating and Domestic Engineers
- Transport and General Workers' Union (Vehicle Building Automotive Group)
