= Amalgamated Machine, Engine and Iron Grinders' and Glazers' Society =

The Amalgamated Machine, Engine and Iron Grinders' and Glazers' Society was a small but long-lasting trade union representing machine workers in the United Kingdom and Ireland.

The union was founded in 1844, but grew only very slowly; by 1897, it had 514 members in eight branches. It affiliated to the General Federation of Trade Unions, within which its secretary, William Saxon, became prominent.

By 1956, membership had slumped to only 150, so in September, the union merged into the Amalgamated Engineering Union.

== General Secretaries ==
John Asquith
1926: William Saxon
1938: W. F. Irvine
1948: H. Milne
