= Card Setting Machine Tenters' Society =

English trade union

CSMTS
- Card Setting Machine Tenters' Society
- Founded: 1872
- Dissolved: 2008
- Headquarters: 36 Greenton Avenue, Cleckheaton
- Location: England
- Members: 297 (1952)
- Affiliations: TUC

The Card Setting Machine Tenters' Society (CSMTS) was a trade union representing workers responsible for setting up textile carding machines in the United Kingdom.

== History ==
The union was founded in late 1872 as a New Model Union and was initially based in Manchester. Other branches were formed in Cleckheaton, Halifax, Haughton Dale and Rochdale, and they initially had a high level of autonomy; those in Lancashire covered the cotton industry, while those in Yorkshire were primarily in the woolen industry. At this point, the union was also known as the Wire Card Setting Machine Tenters' Society.

In 1875, the union formed an executive council to co-ordinate activity, based in Halifax. That year, the Cleckheaton branch embarked on a strike to reduce their working week to 56 hours, but some members broke the strike, which collapsed, while the loyal members were sacked and generally unable to find work in the industry. Although greatly weakened, the union survived, and experienced its most successful period between 1898 and 1918, when it was led by Tom Forrest. It joined the General Federation of Trade Unions (GFTU) and affiliated to the Labour Representation Committee, becoming heavily involved in local politics.

In 1915/16, the union undertook a 23-week strike, demanding a 15% increase in wages. This was not achieved, although a smaller increase of 2 shillings per week was won. Thereafter, it focused on non-militant bargaining with employers.

In 1948, the CSMTS affiliated to the Trades Union Congress (TUC). It remained affiliated to the GFTU, and its former General President Leslie Hodgson was elected as General Secretary of the GFTU in 1953.

Membership of the union declined from the 1950s due to the introduction of metallic carding in the cotton industry. The union was thereafter restricted to the woolen industry in Yorkshire; by 1982, the majority of its members worked for the English Card Clothing Company, and by 1984, membership was down to just 130. Membership decline continued, to only 88 in 1994. That year, about half the remaining membership, including the general secretary, were laid off, leading to one final major strike.

By 2007, the CSMTS was the smallest union affiliated to the TUC, with just 19 members, falling to five at the end of the year, when it decided to dissolve.

== General Secretaries ==
1872: Samuel Green
1875: Samuel Midgley
1876: George Wood
1876: Edwin Kellett
1877: Briggs Shaw
1879: Joseph Kershaw
1881: Charles Ainley
1886: James Moore
1892: Sam Parker
1895: James Farrar
1897: John Garner
1898: Tom Forrest
1918: James Midgley
1924: Edgar Rothery
1931: George Hall
1939: John Maude
1946: Rawden Ashton
1965: Jack Bennett
1970: Granville Priestley
1991: A. Moorhouse
