= Alfred Allen, Baron Allen of Fallowfield =

British unionist and governor of the BBC (1914–1985)

Alfred Walter Henry Allen, Baron Allen of Fallowfield, CBE (7 July 1914 – 14 January 1985) was a British trade unionist and governor of the BBC.

== Early life ==
Born in Bristol, he was educated at East Bristol School and worked then for the Bristol Co-operative Society until 1940, when he joined the Royal Air Force. After the end of the Second World War in 1945, Allen left the Force as a sergeant and was chosen as an area organiser of the National Union of Distributive and Allied Workers in the year thereafter. Following its merger into the Union of Shop, Distributive and Allied Workers in 1947, he became a national officer in 1951. Allen was elected the Union's general secretary in 1962, a post he held for seventeen years until 1979. In the 1967 Birthday Honours, he was appointed a Commander of the Order of the British Empire (CBE).

Allen was a member of the general council of the Trades Union Congress and in 1974 was nominated its president. On 10 July of the latter year, he was created a life peer with the title Baron Allen of Fallowfield, of Fallowfield, in Greater Manchester. In 1977, Allen served in the Board of Governors of the BBC.

In 1940, he married Ruby Millicent Hounsell and they had a son and a daughter.

Trade union offices
Preceded by Alan Birch	General Secretary of the Union of Shop, Distributive and Allied Workers; 1962–1979	Succeeded by Bill Whatley
Preceded by Alan Birch	Food, Drink, etc. Group representative on the General Council of the TUC; 1962–1979; With: Harold Hewitt (1962–1964); Ernest Haynes (1964–1969); Stan Gretton (1969–1973); Doug Grieve (1973–1979)	Succeeded by Bill Whatley
Preceded by James Suffridge	President of the International Federation of Commercial, Clerical, Professional and Technical Employees; 1970–1976	Succeeded by Günter Stephan
Preceded by Joseph Crawford	President of the Trades Union Congress; 1974	Succeeded by Marie Patterson
Preceded by L. F. Edmondson and Cyril Plant	Trades Union Congress representative to the AFL-CIO; 1979	Succeeded by Thomas Jackson
