= Manchester and Salford Weavers' Association =

Former trade union of the United Kingdom

- Merged into: Ashton-under-Lyne Weavers', Winders' and Warpers' Association
- Founded: 1907
- Dissolved: 1951
- Headquarters: 11 Albert Place, Bridge Street, Manchester
- Location: England
- Members: 3,700 (1920)
- Key people: Cecil Heap (Gen Sec)
- Parent organization: Amalgamated Weavers' Association

The Manchester and Salford Weavers' Association was a trade union representing weavers in part of Lancashire, in England.

In 1902, a group of women weavers founded the Salford and District Power Loom Weavers' Association. Unlike other local unions of weavers, all of its officials were also women. It saw initial success, and by the end of the year had 700 members, but this dropped to only 320 the following year. It then began growing again, and by 1907 it had 1,107 members.

Almost all other local weavers' unions were affiliated to the Amalgamated Weavers' Association, and in 1907 it decided to establish an affiliated union for the area, the Manchester, Salford and Pendleton Weavers' Association. Its leader, S. J. Bardsley, claimed that the women's union had done nothing to improve wages or working conditions, but that as soon as trade improved, he would do so. He struggled to attract members, with only 270 by the end of 1908.

The Manchester and Salford Trades Council was concerned about conflict between the two unions, and in 1909 it was asked to adjudicate on the dispute. It recommended that the women's union ballot their members on affiliation to the Weavers' Amalgamation. The leaders of the women's union were dubious about the idea, and when they took it to a ballot, the members voted unanimously against affiliation.

The dispute took its toll on both organisations, and by the end of 1910, the women's union was down to 300 members, while the amalgamated union had just 100. The following year, the editor of the Cotton Factory Times offered to arbitrate between the two, but Bardsley stated that he planned to organise the women's union out of existence.

The women's union retained full membership in a few mills over the next years, but disappeared during World War I. The amalgamated union survived and, without competition, grew rapidly, reaching 3,700 members by 1920. Membership then began falling, but in 1925 Bardsley was replaced by the far more effective Cecil Heap. Heap doubled membership within four years, but by 1934 he was eager for a new challenge, and was replaced by his assistant, Bert Starkie.

The union's membership fell again, in line with employment in the Lancashire cotton industry, and by 1950 it had only 1,020 members. The following year, it merged into the Ashton-under-Lyne Weavers', Winders' and Warpers' Association.

== General Secretaries ==
1907: S. J. Bardsley
1925: Cecil Heap
1934: Bert Starkie
