= Community and Youth Workers' Union =

Former trade union of the United Kingdom

CYWU
- Community and Youth Workers' Union
- Merged into: Transport and General Workers' Union
- Founded: 1938
- Dissolved: 2007
- Headquarters: Birmingham, United Kingdom
- Location: United Kingdom
- Members: 4,800
- Key people: Doug Nicholls, General Secretary
- Affiliations: TUC, GFTU
- Website: www.cywu.org.uk

The Community and Youth Workers Union (CYWU) was a British trade union created in 1938 by ten female voluntary sector workers. It is now a section of Unite the Union. Its members were mainly made up of youth workers, workers in youth theatre, community education, outdoor education, play workers and personal advisers/mentors.

It produced a regular magazine for members, Rapport.

The union had not authorised any national strike action prior to 2004, although the CYWU is the majority union of the Joint Negotiating Committee (JNC) for youth and community workers.

The CYWU voted to join the Transport and General Workers' Union (TGWU) at its 2005 Conference. The merger was confirmed on 13 September 2006, following a vote amongst the unions membership (with 82% in favour on a 26% turnout) and approved by the Trades Union Certification Officer on 8 January 2007.

The General Secretary of CYWU from 1987 until 2007 was Doug Nicholls, who was also secretary of Trade Unionists Against the EU Constitution (UK).

In 2009 the first full history of the union was published Building Rapport: a brief history of the Community and Youth Workers' Union, by Doug Nicholls. This is available from the CYWU section office of Unite the union.

== See also ==
- List of trade unions
- Transport and General Workers' Union
- TGWU amalgamations
