= Arthur Howcroft =

British trade union leader

Arthur Howcroft (died 25 January 1976) was a British trade union leader.

Howcroft worked as a manager in the Bolton cotton mills, and he joined the Bolton and District Managers' and Overlookers' Association. In 1949, he was elected as general secretary of the small union. The union was affiliated to the General Union of Loom Overlookers (GULO), and in 1963, he was elected as general secretary of GULO.

While GULO was not a large organisation, Howcroft became prominent through representing it on other bodies. From 1964, he served on the Management Committee of the General Federation of Trade Unions (GFTU), and in 1971/72, he was chair of the GFTU. He briefly served as secretary of the Northern Counties Textile Trades Federation. Under his leadership, GULO formed the British Federation of Textile Technicians, to work more closely with other unions in the industry.

Howcroft died early in 1976, still in office.

Trade union offices
Preceded by J. E. Hosley	General Secretary of the Bolton and District Managers' and Overlookers' Association; 1949–1963	Succeeded by J. K. Brindle
Preceded by Fred Titherington	General Secretary of the General Union of Loom Overlookers; 1963–1976	Succeeded by Harold Brown
Preceded by Jim Browning	Chairman of the General Federation of Trade Unions; 1971–1972	Succeeded by Ken Arnold
