= Greater London Plan =

1944 development plan in England

The Greater London Plan of 1944 was developed by Patrick Abercrombie (1879–1957). The plan was directly related to the County of London Plan written by John Henry Forshaw (1895–1973) and Abercrombie in 1943. Following World War II, London was presented with an opportunity to amend the perceived failings of unplanned and haphazard development that had occurred as a result of rapid industrialisation in the nineteenth century.

During the Second World War, the Blitz had destroyed large urban areas throughout the entire county of London, but particularly the central core. Over 50,000 inner London homes were completely destroyed, while more than 2 million dwellings experienced some form of bomb damage. This presented the London County Council with a unique chance to plan and rebuild vacant tracts of the city on a scale not seen since the Great Fire of London.

The plan was based around five main issues facing London at the time:

- Population growth
- Housing
- Employment and industry
- Recreation
- Transport

== Plan ==
=== Population growth and decentralisation ===
Rapid population growth, combined with the inevitable return of many evacuees during the war, saw London facing significant housing shortages and density problems. The 118 square mile city was estimated to have a population of over 4 million in 1938. A series of four rings were outlined (Inner Urban, Suburban, Green Belt and Outer Country) in order to control development and limit sprawl into regional areas. The 'Inner Urban Ring' restricted any new housing or industrial development that were deemed to be above the limit of tolerable conditions, whilst reconstructing damaged buildings in a modern interpretation of their original state. The 'Suburban Ring' would be developed with a mix of both housing and light industry so that no regions became inefficient dormitory suburbs. The 'Green Belt Ring' encouraged the creation of parkland and recreational spaces, restrictions were placed on all development apart from that within existing villages. The 'Outer Country Ring' would support farmland whilst containing a number of satellite towns that would help to relocate large populations away from the overcrowded areas of central London. Indeed, Abercrombie's plan proposed to move over one million people out of Greater London into the New Towns, alongside related industrial employment. This was described by papers at the time as the 'biggest mass-migration in our history'. In a promotional film, 'The Proud City', produced at the time by the London County Council, Lord Latham, Leader of LCC stated "We must reduce the number of people and industries in the congested areas, if everyone is to be decently housed with plenty of open space for rest and play." The plan projected an increase in the population it expected would have to move compared to the County of London Plan, from 415,000 to 1,033,000 inhabitants.

=== Housing ===
The creation of new housing developments were to be mostly concentrated within areas damaged by the air raids, the suburban ring and in new satellite towns. Abercrombie notes the locations of existing communities within London, and aims to develop these communities as growth areas focused around a core neighbourhood. Housing development aimed to foster these communities with a mix of professions, family sizes and socio-economic groups. The 'Homes of One's Own' initiative aimed to reduce the number of families that were forced to share a dwelling (63.5% of families were forced to share their home in 1931). Affordable living options in both apartment and detached houses would be constructed under the Greater London Plan. Specific architectural styles would be adhered to throughout all new developments in order to create aesthetically pleasing streetscapes.

=== Employment and industry ===
The creation of strong neighbourhood centres would be complemented by a mix of commercial opportunities that service the immediate area. Employment opportunities were to be located in proximity to dwellings in order to allow the formation of a labour pool, yet not so close that it would adversely affect the surrounding populations. The main focus for manufacturing industries would be to relocate away from the dense inner city and into ‘new towns’ with access to a specialised labour force. Particular industries were to be located in areas with access to the relevant necessary resources such as rail stations or the River Thames. Complementary industries were encouraged to cluster together so that they could benefit from the input sharing and knowledge spillovers of each neighbouring firm.

=== Recreation ===
The development of open spaces was of high importance to Abercrombie in the Greater London Plan, recreation was seen as an essential part of life. All open spaces were to be retained, with particular significance given to the development of a 'green belt'. A variety of open spaces was to be established, from city squares and formal gardens to more wild and picturesque parks. A series of parkways would be created, allowing residents to walk between the major open spaces unimpeded by traffic. It was hoped that for every 1000 city residents there would be four acres of accessible open space. In 1944, some boroughs experienced 0.1 acre of open space per 1000 inhabitants. Abercrombie acknowledges that London is far too dense to provide an appropriate level of open space for each resident, so it is proposed that improved transport will allow every inhabitant access to recreational areas outside of their immediate neighbourhood.

=== Transport ===
Dwellings, industry and recreational spaces are all linked by transport within London. Ensuring adequate levels of efficient transport were key to the Greater London Plan. Although transportation had rapidly changed throughout the 20th century, the roadways had not. The number of cars in Britain had risen from 143,877 in 1910 to 3,084,896 in 1940. This led to areas of mass congestion and an increase in transport related accidents. Abercrombie sought to improve traffic circulation via a separation of differing modes on a number of levels throughout the city. A series of main arterial and ring roads would also allow road users to avoid the most congested sections of the network. Rail transit in London was to be separated into differing passenger and commercial networks. However rail was privately owned, creating an environment whereby planning legislation had little effect on the operations of railway companies. The River Thames was to be redefined as a focal point for the city, and it was hoped to maximize its potential as a trade and transport resource.

The plan introduced the idea of four ring roads: "inner", "built-up", "suburban", "Green Belt".

== Repercussions of The Greater London Plan ==
Although the report was comprehensive in attempting to solve the issues facing London at the time, its implementation was not fully realised. The economic climate in Britain during the post war era simply did not allow for major infrastructure development on the scale that Abercrombie had suggested. Even though a gradualist, Geddesian style approach was suggested, Abercrombie may not have consideredmay not have considered the minimal impact that one visionary can have on an ancient, complex and ever growing city such as London. No matter the resulting level of physical construction, the Greater London Plan was extremely successful in creating an optimistic outlook for the people of London, providing hope for the return of a great civilisation from the depths of World War Two.

== Proud City ==
A 24-and-a-half minute film about the plan, called The Proud City – A plan for London was produced for the Ministry of Information, with appearances by Abercrombie, J H Forshaw (Architect to the London County Council), Lord Latham (Leader of the LCC) and other members of the architect's staff. It was written and directed by Ralph Keene and is available online at the Internet Archive.

== Bibliography ==
- Abercrombie, Patrick. Greater London Plan, London: University of London Press, 1944.
- Asher, Wayne. 2018. Rings Around London – Orbital Motorways and The Battle For Homes Before Roads. ISBN 978-1-85414-421-8
- Carter, E.J. & Goldfinger, Erno. The County of London Plan, London: Penguin Books, 1945.
- White, Jerry. London in the 20th Century: A City and its People. London: Random House, 2008.
