= Lancashire Amalgamated Tape Sizers' Friendly Society =

Cotton trade union in Lancashire, England

- Merged into: Amalgamated Engineering and Electrical Union
- Founded: 1882
- Dissolved: 1993
- Headquarters: 238 Manchester Road, Nelson, Lancashire
- Location: England
- Members: 1,157 (1910)
- Affiliations: TUC, GFTU, NCTTF

The Lancashire Amalgamated Tape Sizers' Friendly Society was a trade union representing workers involved in the preparation of cotton in the Lancashire area of England.

== Tape sizing ==
Tape sizing is the process of adding polymers and wax to cotton yarn in order that it will be less likely to break when being woven. In the 19th- and early 20th-centuries, tape sizers were regarded as being the most skilled workers in the cotton industry and therefore were able to command relatively good wages and conditions of employment.

== History ==
The society regarded itself as having been founded in 1882, although the Board of Trade gave 1880 as the year of formation. Impetus for forming the society appears to have come from the Haslingden and Rossendale District Cotton Sizers' Protective Society. It was initially known as the North and North East Lancashire Amalgamated Tape Sizers' Protective Society.

By 1894, ten local unions held membership of the amalgamation, although as all were very small, it represented a total of only 910 workers. Early in the 1900s, it added "South Lancashire" to its name, probably in the hope of persuading the rival Amalgamated Tape Sizers' Friendly Protection Society to affiliate, although this Ashton-under-Lyne based union did not do so.

Affiliates of the union were:

Union	Founded	Affiliated	Membership (1907)	Notes
Accrington and Church	1860		64	Merged into Nelson, Colne and District 1984
Amalgamated	1861	1979	145	
Blackburn	1865		277	Merged into Association of Preparatory Workers 1990
Bolton and District	1877		79	Merged into Association of Preparatory Workers 1986
Burnley and District	1879		120	Merged into Association of Preparatory Workers 1986
Bury and District	1861		104	Merged into Nelson, Colne and District 1978
Darwen	1852		112	Merged into Blackburn 1964
Great Harwood	1860		70	Dissolved 1965
Haslingden and Rossendale	1877	1882	80	Merged into Nelson, Colne and District 1985
Nelson, Colne and District	1887		82	Merged into Association of Preparatory Workers 1986
Preston	1867		133	Merged into Nelson, Colne and District 1980

In 1908, the union became the Lancashire Amalgamated Tape Sizers' Friendly Society, and it was later renamed as the Lancashire Amalgamated Tape Sizers' Association. Membership rose slightly to 1,157 in 1910, falling slightly when the Great Harwood union left, although it later rejoined. Membership in 1955 was still 955, but it then began falling rapidly, to only 496 in 1968. Affiliates began merging with each other, although there was a small boost to membership in 1979 when the Amalgamated Tape Sizers finally affiliated. By 1990, only two affiliates remained: the Amalgamated Tape Sizers and the Association of Preparatory Workers.

In 1991, the union changed its organisation, so that all members would hold dual membership with the Association of Preparatory Workers. The Tape Sizers would conduct all trade union business, while the Preparatory Workers would only deal with matters relating to property. Membership continued to decline, and in 1993 the union merged into the Amalgamated Engineering and Electrical Union.

== General secretaries ==
as of 1896: R. Walkden
1913: John W. Ainsworth
1920s: W. Wallwork
c.1930: J. Ormerod
1930s: W. Burnett
1974: Harry Howorth
