= Stan Gretton =

British trade union leader

Stanley Gretton (1920 or 1921 – 17 June 1975) was a British trade union leader.

Gretton worked as a baker, and joined the Amalgamated Union of Operative Bakers in 1937. He soon became a shop steward, then branch secretary, before working full-time for the union at the district and regional level. In 1968, he was elected as general secretary of what was by then known as the Bakers' Union.

As leader, Gretton was considered to be on the right wing of the union movement. He focused his time on the industry's National Joint Committee for England and Wales, and was chosen as its chair. He was elected to the General Council of the Trades Union Congress (TUC) in 1969, but in 1972 the union refused to follow TUC policy of deregistering with the government, and was therefore expelled from the organisation. That year, he was made an Officer of the Order of the British Empire.

By 1974, union members were becoming increasingly discontented with low pay, but Gretton opposed claims for large wage increases, arguing that they were motivated by "outside influences". He died suddenly in 1975, and was succeeded by Sam Maddox, a more left-wing figure.

Outside his union Gretton also served on the committees of the Churchill Trust, the Pre-Retirement Association, and the Apprenticeship Council of the Baking Industry.

Trade union offices
Preceded by Jock Halliday	General Secretary of the Bakers' Union; 1968–1975	Succeeded by Sam Maddox
Preceded by Alf Allen and Ernest Haynes	Food, Drink, etc. Group representative on the General Council of the TUC; 1969–1972; With: Alf Allen	Succeeded by Alf Allen and Doug Grieve
