= Cecil Heap =

British trade union leader and politician

Cecil Heap (1902 – 24 March 1967) was a British trade union leader and politician.

The son of Fred Heap, Cecil was born in Bury, then in Lancashire. In 1919, Heap began working for the Manchester, Salford and District Weavers' Association. In 1925, the union's general secretary died, and Heap beat 26 other applicants in an exam set by the Amalgamated Weavers' Association, to win the post. The union was in decline, but Heap led an organising campaign which doubled its membership in five years, and also improved its finances. He also became active in the General Federation of Trade Unions (GFTU), and was a leading figure in its organising campaign of the late 1920s.

In 1935, Heap moved to become general secretary of the Wallpaper Workers' Union. He followed the policy of his predecessor, Charles Kean, of engaging in committees with employers, and avoiding industrial action. Membership grew slowly under his leadership, In 1938, he was elected to the Management Committee of the GFTU, and he served as its chair in 1956 and 1957.

Heap was also active in the Labour Party, and served on Bury Town Council. For a period, he was the leader of the Labour group on the council. In his spare time, Heap was a justice of the peace, chair of the governors of Bury Grammar School, and chair of Unsworth Cricket Club.

Heap was due to retire in March 1967, but died in hospital a few days before his planned retirement date.

Trade union offices
Preceded by S. J. Bardsley	General Secretary of the Manchester, Salford and District Weavers' Association; 1925–1934	Succeeded by Bert Starkie
Preceded by Charles Kean	General Secretary of the Wallpaper Workers' Union; 1935–1967	Succeeded by Duncan McIntosh
Preceded by Archie Robertson	Chair of the General Federation of Trade Unions; 1954–1956	Succeeded by Bert Head
