= Yorkshire Association of Power Loom Overlookers =

Former trade union of the United Kingdom

- Merged into: Transport and General Workers Union
- Founded: 1911
- Dissolved: 1993
- Headquarters: Textile Hall, Westgate, Bradford
- Location: United Kingdom
- Members: 2,300 (1920)
- Affiliations: General Federation of Trade Unions, Labour Party, Trades Union Congress

The Yorkshire Association of Power Loom Overlookers (YAPLO) was a trade union representing junior supervisors in weaving in the United Kingdom.

The association was founded in 1911 as the Yorkshire Federation of Power Loom Overlookers, then in 1921 took its final name. At this point, it consisted of local unions based in Dewsbury, Bradford, Halifax, Huddersfield, Keighley and Leeds. Membership peaked at 2,300 in 1920, but by 1973 was still at 1,815.

In 1971, the union founded the "British Federation of Textile Technicians" with the General Union of Associations of Power Loom Overlookers and the Scottish Union of Power Loom Overlookers.

Membership dropped rapidly from the 1970s on, reflecting widespread redundancies in the industry. It fell to 1,130 in 1979, and just 537 in 1989. With many of its affiliates no longer sustainable, in 1990, the Bradford, Halifax, Keighley and Leeds associations merged into YAPLO. In 1993, the union merged into the Transport and General Workers' Union.

== General Secretaries ==
1910s: J. W. Butler
1921: Frank Dickinson
1960: Edwin D. Sleeman
1978: K. Hattersley
