= Associated Metalworkers' Union =

Former trade union of the United Kingdom

- Merged into: Amalgamated Engineering and Electrical Union
- Founded: 1863
- Dissolved: 1999
- Headquarters: 92 Deansgate, Manchester
- Location: United Kingdom
- Members: 6,007 (1980)
- Affiliations: Trades Union Congress, GFTU

The Associated Metalworkers' Union was a trade union in the United Kingdom which existed between 1863 and 1999. It represented semi-skilled foundry workers known as iron dressers or fettlers, who were responsible for removing moulding sand and excess metal from castings.

== History ==
The union was founded in about 1863 as the Iron Dressers' Society, gradually extending its name to Iron, Steel and Metal Dressers' Society. The exact date of its foundation is unclear; the union itself gave 1868 as the date of its foundation, while the Board of Trade gave 1860. It was renamed in 1951 as the Iron, Steel and Metal Dressers and Kindred Trades Society, then in 1964 as the Associated Metal Workers Society, soon after taking its final name.

In 1980, the union had a membership just over 6,000, but by 1994 this had declined to only 928 members. Facing a dramatic drop in membership, it left the Trades Union Congress in 1987, but subsequently rejoined. In 1999, it merged into the Amalgamated Engineering and Electrical Union.

== General secretaries ==
1900s: C. W. Davidson
1928: Jack Wigglesworth
1958: Edward Tullock
1984: Ron Marron
