= Charles Kean (trade unionist) =

British trade union leader

Charles Kean (16 February 1868 – 16 January 1944) was a British trade union leader. He brought together workers in the wallpaper industry in a single union.

For many years, Kean was an active trade unionist, based in Manchester. In 1908, he began representing the Manchester and Salford Trades Council on the Manchester Education Committee, and in later years he also served as the council's president.

From 1909, Kean was leader of the small Amalgamated Union of Engravers to Calico Printers and Paper Stainers. In 1917, he founded the Wallpaper Stainers' Trade Union Federation, which also included the Amalgamated Society of Machine Paper Stainers and Colour Mixers of Great Britain and the Paper Stainers' Union of General Workers. Kean persuaded the two to join with those members of his union involved in the manufacture of wallpaper in forming a new Wallpaper Workers' Union.

Kean decided to focus on the wallpaper industry, and resigned from the Engravers in 1920; he was elected as the first general secretary of the Wallpaper Workers' Union. Under his leadership, the union established the Wallpaper Makers' Industrial Council, which focused on negotiations with employers, and the avoidance of industrial action. He represented the union to the General Federation of Trade Unions, serving on its management council for twelve years, and as chair of the federation from 1930 to 1932.

Kean retired as leader of the Wallpaper Workers' Union in 1935, becoming the superintendent of the Wallpaper Trade Convalescent and Holiday Home. He remained active on the Manchester Education Committee until shortly before his death, early in 1944.

Trade union offices
Preceded by New position	General Secretary of the Amalgamated Union of Engravers to Calico Printers and Paper Stainers; 1909–1920	Succeeded by James Thomson
Preceded by John Sime	Chair of the General Federation of Trade Unions; 1930–1932	Succeeded by William Aucock
Preceded by New position	General Secretary of the Wallpaper Workers' Union; 1920–1935	Succeeded by Cecil Heap
