= Scottish Union of Power Loom Overlookers =

The Scottish Union of Power Loom Overlookers was a trade union representing supervisors in textile mills in Scotland.

The union was founded at some point in the 1880s as the Dundee Power Loom Tenters' Association, and was led for many years by James Reid. Around the time of World War II, it changed its name to the Scottish Union of Power Loom Tenters, having incorporated local power loom tenters' organisations in Dunfermline and Perth.

In 1969, the union adopted its best known name, its membership at the time being around 350 workers. In 1971, the union founded the "British Federation of Textile Technicians" with the General Union of Associations of Power Loom Overlookers and the Yorkshire Association of Power Loom Overlookers.

Its membership then began to fall, dropping to only 65 by 1989, by which time it was known as the Scottish Union of Power Loom Technicians. It dissolved in 2000.

== General Secretaries ==
c.1890: James Reid
1910s: P. McGregor
1920s: R. Macbeth
1970s: J. D. Reilly
