= Tom Whittaker (trade unionist) =

British trade union leader

Thomas Whittaker (died 10 May 1995) was a British trade union leader. He devoted his life to a small trade union, while holding prominent positions in the General Federation of Trade Unions.

Whittaker worked in the shoe factory of Lambert Howarth and Sons. In 1935, he joined the Rossendale Union of Boot, Shoe and Slipper Operatives (RUBSSO), and in 1947 he was elected as the union's assistant general secretary. In 1969, Whittaker succeeded as general secretary of the union, in which post he was known for his unemotional approach to negotiations.

On being elected as leader of the Rossendale Union, Whittaker also won election to the Management Committee of the General Federation of Trade Unions (GFTU). He served as chair of the federation in 1975, and championed the creation of a GFTU Research Service.

Whittaker also served on a number of committees relating to the shoemaking industry, and on the Bacup, Rawtenstall and Ramsbottom Trades Council.

Whittaker retired in 1993, but remained active in trade unionism in a voluntary role. He died in 1995, on return home from the GFTU conference.

Trade union offices
Preceded by Robert Driver	General Secretary of the Rossendale Union of Boot, Shoe and Slipper Operatives; 1969–1983	Succeeded by Michael Murray
Preceded by Harold Gibson	Chair of the General Federation of Trade Unions; 1975–1976	Succeeded by Margaret Fenwick
