= Peter Potts =

Peter Potts (29 June 1935 – 30 January 1996) was a British trade unionist, who served as General Secretary of the General Federation of Trade Unions.

Potts grew up in Manchester, where he attended Chorlton High School. He began working and joined the Union of Shop, Distributive and Allied Workers in 1951. After undertaking National Service with the Royal Air Force from 1953 to 1955, he became increasingly involved in trade unionism, and in 1965 became the full-time research officer of the National Union of Tailors and Garment Workers (NUTGW). He also spent time studying at Ruskin College.

In 1974, Potts becoming NUTGW's national officer for clerical and supervisory staffs, and from 1975 he was involved in the Trade Union Research Unit, which he chaired from 1984. He was recruited by the General Federation of Trade Unions as its general secretary, taking over at the end of 1977. Alongside this post, he was also on the Trade Union Unit Trust Investors Committee, the governing council of Ruskin College, and from 1979, the Trade Union International Research and Education Group. From 1987 to 1990, he additionally served on the Press Council.

Potts retired in 1994, but remained active as the chair of the Trade Union International Research and Education Group. He died early in 1996.

Trade union offices
Preceded by Leslie Hodgson	General Secretary of the General Federation of Trade Unions; 1977–1994	Succeeded by Michael Bradley
