= United Society of Engravers =

Former trade union of the United Kingdom

The United Society of Engravers was a trade union representing engravers, principally in the cotton industry, but also in the paper printing industry, in the United Kingdom.

The union was founded in 1889 in Manchester, as the Engravers to Calico Printers and Paper Stainers. Its membership was over 1,000 by 1898, and in 1909 the Scottish Engravers to Calico Printers and Paper Stainers merged in, the union renaming itself as the Amalgamated Union of Engravers to Calico Printers and Paper Stainers.

The union's general secretary, Charles Kean, recognising that many of the union's members worked in the wallpaper trade, formed the Wallpaper Stainers' Trade Union Federation in 1917. This was a success, and in 1920 Kean took the union's wallpaper workers into a new Wallpaper Workers' Union along with other unions in the industry.

The remainder of the union, still covering both the cotton and paper printing industries, renamed itself as the United Society of Engravers of Great Britain and Ireland. Over time, it became more strongly associated with cotton. Membership peaked at 1,600 in the 1930s, but then began to fall, declining to only 500 by 1972.

In 1973, the union merged into the Society of Lithographic Artists, Designers, Engravers and Process Workers, forming its new wallpaper and textiles section.

== General Secretaries ==
1909: Charles Kean
1920: James Thomson
1953: D. Hill
