= Leslie Hodgson =

Leslie Hodgson (29 August 1914 – 17 January 1979) was a British trade unionist.

Born in Driffield, Hodgson came into contact with the trade union movement by playing cricket alongside coal miners. He trained as a carding machine operator in the woollen industry, and joined the Card Setting Machine Tenters' Society (CSMTS) in 1933. In 1951, he was elected as the union's General President.

The CSMTS was one of the smallest unions affiliated to the General Federation of Trade Unions (GFTU), and in 1952, Hodgson was elected as the GFTU's assistant general secretary, standing down from his post in the CSMTS. The GFTU's general secretary, George Bell, was in poor health, and the association had been struggling to recruit a suitable replacement. The union's management committee agreed with Hodgson that, if his work was satisfactory, he would be promoted within two years. However, when he arrived, Bell announced that he did not wish to retire and did not want an assistant.

Hodgson devoted his time as assistant general secretary to external training and learning the culture of the organisation. Early in 1953, the management committee convinced Bell to take a six-month leave of absence. At the end of this period, Bell finally decided to retire, and Hodgson was appointed as his replacement.

Alice Prochaska, who wrote the official history of the GFTU, describes the modern organisation as "substantially Leslie Hodgson's creation", although noting that he ensured all his innovations were proposed as the idea of a member union or one of its representatives, and had a low profile in the national union movement. Under Hodgson's leadership, the GFTU gained a significant number of new members, including some larger unions, and for the first time set up a research service.

Hodgson announced in 1976 that he wished to retire, but the Management Committee decided that none of the first set of candidates to replace him were suitable, so he served until December 1977, spending the last three months alongside his successor, Peter Potts. A few days after retiring, Hodgson was diagnosed with cancer, and he died in the middle of January 1979.

Trade union offices
Preceded by George Bell	General Secretary of the General Federation of Trade Unions; 1953 – 1977	Succeeded by Peter Potts
