= Lancashire Box, Packing Case and General Woodworkers' Society =

Former trade union of the United Kingdom

- Merged into: Transport and General Workers' Union
- Founded: 1825
- Dissolved: 1993
- Headquarters: 50 Burton Road, Withington, Manchester
- Location: England
- Affiliations: GFTU

The Lancashire Box, Packing Case and General Woodworkers' Society (LBPCGW) was a long-lived trade union in England, principally representing workers involved in making wooden boxes in the Manchester area.

== History ==
The union was founded in 1825 as the Manchester and Salford Trunk and Packing Case Makers' Friendly, Relief and Burial Society. Initially, all members had to have completed an apprenticeship in the trade, and to agree not to undertake piecework. Because most of the boxes made were for textile products, the union worked closely with those in the cotton trade, rather than other unions of woodworkers.

Membership of the union remained very small for many years: only 161 in 1849, and 360 in 1899. It tried to broaden its membership base, becoming the Manchester, Salford and Bolton Wood Packing Case Makers' Society in 1892, and unsuccessfully trying to recruit workers in the trade on lower wages in both 1900 and 1905. These workers instead formed a rival Manchester and Salford Wood Packing Case Makers (No 2 Society), which finally merged into the original union in 1910.

After World War I, the society again broadened its remit, accepting box makers from 1917, child workers from 1918, and workers undertaking piecework from 1919. This took membership over 1,000, and from 1918 the union was able to employ a full-time general secretary.

The cotton industry declined in Lancashire throughout the 20th-century, and the union began recruiting more workers involved in making packaging for heavy engineering products, such workers making up 90% of the total by the 1970s. It also recruited palette makers and some people involved in other areas of woodwork, and in recognition of this adopted its final name in 1945.

The union was still active in the mid-1980s, with around 500 members. In 1993, it merged into the Transport and General Workers' Union.

== General Secretaries ==
1970s-80s: Alan Smith, father of Jeff Smith.
