= Coordinating Committee of International Staff Unions and Associations of the United Nations System =

CCISUA
- Coordinating Committee of International Staff Unions and Associations of the United Nations System
- Founded: 1982
- Location: United Nations
- Members: 60,000
- Key people: Nathalie Meynet (UNHCR), President; Giammichele Dimaio (WFP), General Secretary; Pamela Odhiambo (UNON), Treasurer; Ian Richards (UNOG), Vice President for Conditions of Service; June Anyango (UNICEF), Vice President for Field and Security Issues; Carlos Carrion-Crespo (ILO), Vice President for Communication & Outreach
- Website: www.ccisua.org

The Coordinating Committee of International Staff Unions and Associations of the United Nations System (CCISUA) is an international federation of UN system staff unions and associations committed to an atmosphere of constructive cooperation in order to provide equitable and effective representation of staff at all levels. CCISUA primarily represents member interests in inter-agency bodies that make decisions and recommendations on conditions of service.

There are three labour federations serving unions and staff associations in the UN system, the other organisations being FICSA and UNISERV.

== Objectives ==
CCISUA's main objectives are as follows:

1. To promote the common interest of international civil servants of all categories whose staff unions/associations are members of CCISUA.

2. To provide a means for staff representative bodies with common concerns to consult with one another both formally and informally with a view to reaching consensus on issues affecting conditions of service and staff welfare.

3. To permit those staff unions, associations, and other staff representative bodies of the system to address advisory and decision-making bodies with a united voice and in particular to participate actively in the work of ICSC, HR Network, HLCM, CEB, the Pension Board, and the Fifth Committee of the General Assembly.

4. To assist each other in finding solutions to common problems and in monitoring the implementation of decisions affecting the staff both at Headquarters duty stations and in the field.

5. To cooperate with other staff groups with a view to formally arriving at common positions on matters affecting staff welfare.

6. To adhere to the spirit of solidarity and support for each member whenever needed.

== Industrial relations in the UN system ==
Unions and staff associations of the United Nations system are unique because UN staff do not have a single employer: they are employed by the 193 member states. Because they work for an international agency, they are not protected by any national labour legislation or international conventions. Although freedom of association is written into the UN staff regulations, national unions are not recognised, and terms and conditions are negotiated directly with representatives of the member states. The first collective agreement recognised by the UN system was signed with CCISUA affiliate ILO Staff Union in 2000.

UN Staff Regulation (SR) 8.1 allows for staff representative bodies to be established at each UN organisation or mission and for those bodies to represent the interests of the staff. Each UN mission or organisation has established its own union or staff association, and these are affiliated to either CCISUA or FICSA.

== Issues for UN staff ==
UN staff face many of the same issues as workers in national economies, and CCISUA affiliates represent both blue-collar staff - such as security guards - as well as white-collar UN civil servants. CCISUA affiliates do not represent UN Peacekeepers, who are made up of military and police personal contributed by member states.

There are a number of industrial relations issues that are peculiar to working within the UN system. The most important of these is perhaps the fact that UN staff are not protected by labour legislation, which means that all conditions need to be negotiated directly with employer representatives.

Also of great concern are the dangers to staff working in areas of conflict and other non-secure locations. Many UN staff are killed in the line of duty.

Another area of concern is the prevalence of short-term contracts in the UN system, the lack of job security and long-term career development.

== Affiliation ==
CCISUA shares fraternal links with the wider labour movement through its affiliation to the GFTU, and through the GFTU to the European Trade Union Confederation and the International Trade Union Confederation.

== Membership ==
Trade unions and staff associations of the following UN and international organisations are affiliated to CCISUA.

- UNICEF
- UN-Criminal Tribunals Staff Union
- International Criminal Court
- International Labour Organization
- United Nations University
- United Nations Economic Commission for Latin America and the Caribbean
- United Nations Economic and Social Commission for Western Asia
- United Nations Economic Commission for Africa
- United Nations Economic and Social Commission for Asia and the Pacific
- United Nations High Commissioner for Refugees
- International Telecommunication Union
- United Nations Industrial Development Organization
- UN Nairobi Staff Union
- UNOG Staff Coordinating Council (UN Staff Union Geneva)
- World Food Programme
- International Court of Justice
- Special Tribunal for Lebanon
- UN Institute for Training and Research

== Acknowledgements ==
Some information for this article was taken from a Masters thesis by Rick Cottam, President of the ICTY Staff Union.
