= Association of Educational Psychologists =

British trade union

- Founded: 1962; 64 years ago
- Headquarters: Durham
- Location: United Kingdom
- Members: ▲4,256 (2024)
- General Secretary: Donna Wiggett
- Affiliations: TUC; STUC; GFTU
- Website: aep.org.uk

The Association of Educational Psychologists is a trade union in the United Kingdom.

The British Psychological Society represented educational psychologists until 1962, when it received chartered status. Those members who wished to remain part of a body able to negotiate on their behalf formed the "Association of Educational Psychologists", although it delegated the actual negotiations to the National Union of Teachers and the Ulster Teachers Union.

In 1997, the organisation took over negotiation duties from the National Union of Teachers, and in 1999, it affiliated to the Trades Union Congress. It only began accepting members in Scotland in 2003. Its president in 2006 was Mary Jenkin.
