= Northern Carpet Trades Union =

Former trade union of the United Kingdom

NCTU
- Northern Carpet Trades Union
- Merged into: Transport and General Workers Union
- Founded: 1892
- Dissolved: 2000
- Headquarters: 22 Clare Road, Halifax, West Yorkshire
- Location: England
- Members: 2,065 (1979)

The Northern Carpet Trades Union (NCTU) was a trade union in the United Kingdom. It was first formed in 1892 in Halifax, West Yorkshire, later expanding to cover all of Northern England. The NCTU was formed later than the Power Loom Carpet Weavers' and Textile Workers' Association, based in Kidderminster, and was considerably smaller. Approximately a fifth of eligible workers were members of the NCTU in 1939, compared to 50 percent for the Kidderminster union. Attempts to amalgamate all unions in the carpet trade failed, but in 1917 the National Affiliation of Carpet Trade Unions was established with equal representation from the NCTU, Scottish Carpet Workers' Union, National Union of Dyers, Bleachers and Textile Workers and Power Loom Carpet Weavers' and Textile Workers' Union.

The NCTU originally only represented carpet weavers, but later came to represent all employees in the carpet industry including a staff section for supervisors and management. It merged with the Transport and General Workers' Union in 2000.

== General Secretaries ==
1915: Ellis Crowther
1950: H. H. Clee
1954: H. D. Pickles
1967: Reginald Townsend
1972: Leslie R. Smith
1980s: Keith Edmondson

== See also ==
- TGWU amalgamations
