= Joe Marino =

British trade unionist

Joe Marino (born 1946, Wythenshawe, Manchester) is a British trade unionist.

Marino joined the Bakers, Food and Allied Workers' Union (BFAWU) in his youth, and was elected as a shop steward in 1968. He was active in attempts to build a shop stewards' movement, and in 1971 was elected to the union's National Executive Council, soon also becoming involved in national negotiations over pay and conditions. He had worked previously as a baker at the Old Trafford factory of Knightsbridge Cakes.

BFAWU members undertook a national strike in 1978; this ended in defeat, but Marino's profile increased to the extent that he was elected as the union's general secretary the following year. At this time, he was a member of Militant, a Trotskyist group in the Labour Party.

Marino left the Labour Party in the 1990s, and joined the Socialist Labour Party, for which he stood unsuccessfully in London at the European Parliament election, 1999, championing a Eurosceptic position.

Marino remained general secretary of BFAWU until his retirement in 2010. From 1998, he also served on the executive of the General Federation of Trade Unions, and as its chair from 2009 until 2011.

Trade union offices
| Preceded by Sam Maddox | General Secretary of the Bakers, Food and Allied Workers' Union; 1979–2010 | Succeeded by Ronnie Draper |
| Preceded by Doug Nicholls | Chair of the General Federation of Trade Unions; 2009–2011 | Succeeded by Joe Mann |
