= Tobacco Workers' Union =

Former trade union of the United Kingdom

- Merged into: Technical, Administrative and Supervisory Section
- Founded: 1834
- Dissolved: 1986
- Headquarters: City Road, London
- Location: United Kingdom
- Members: 20,630 (1980)
- Publication: Tobacco Worker
- Affiliations: Trades Union Congress

The Tobacco Workers' Union (TWU) was a trade union representing workers in all areas of the tobacco industry in the United Kingdom.

== History ==
The union was founded in 1834 in London as the Friendly Society of Operative Tobacconists. Two years later, it expanded its membership to include tobacco cutters, dryers and stovers and was renamed the United Tobacconists Society. In 1851, it expanded again to include cigarette makers, and in 1881 it took another name, the United Operative Tobacconists throughout the Kingdom. For much of this period, the union was based in Liverpool at the houses of its successive general secretaries, but in 1918 it relocated to London.

In 1925, the association became an industrial union, admitting all workers in the tobacco industry, including women, and adopted its final name. However, the following year, it was disaffiliated from the Trades Union Congress after other unions complained that it was poaching their members. It rejoined only in 1941. In 1946, the union merged with the rival National Cigar and Tobacco Workers' Union.

In 1986, the union merged into Technical, Administrative and Supervisory Section, forming the union's new Tobacco Sector.

== Election results ==
The union sponsored its Liverpool district organiser as a Labour Party candidate in the 1959 general election:

Constituency	Candidate	Votes	Percentage	Position
Middleton and Prestwich	Fred Barton	21,248	40.4	2

== General secretaries ==
1834: Robert Stevens
1910s: E. Kayler
1924: C. W. Dorrell
1925: Andrew Boyd
1941: Percy Belcher
1964: David Burke
1967: Charles Butler
1969: Doug Grieve
