= Bengal Jute Mill Workers' Union =

Trade union in India

Bengal Jute Mill Workers' Union is a trade union of jute mill workers in West Bengal, India. The union is affiliated to the All India United Trade Union Centre.
