= Northern Counties Textile Trades Federation =

Trade union in England

The Northern Counties Textile Trades Federation was a trade union federation in northern England.

== History ==
The federation was founded in 1906. By 1907, it brought together unions representing 126,700 members. Despite its name, it only included unions representing workers in the cotton industry; the wool industry and textile finishing were instead covered by the National Association of Unions in the Textile Trade. Another similar organisation, the United Textile Factory Workers' Association, devoted itself to political work, and two of its members (the Amalgamated Association of Card and Blowing Room Operatives and the Amalgamated Association of Operative Cotton Spinners) never joined the federation.

By 1960, the federation's members were:

- Amalgamated Association of Beamers, Twisters and Drawers (Hand and Machine)
- Amalgamated Tape Sizers' Friendly Protection Society
- Amalgamated Textile Warehousemen's Association
- Amalgamated Weavers' Association
- General Union of Loom Overlookers
- Lancashire Amalgamated Tape Sizers' Friendly Society
- Lancashire and Yorkshire Warp Dressers' Association

== General Secretaries ==
1906: Tom Shaw
1919: Luke Bates
1943: Andrew Naesmith
1953: Lewis Wright
1968: Harry Kershaw
c.1970: Arthur Howcroft
1971: Fred Hague
1980s: Harry Haworth
