= William Aucock =

William Aucock (1882 – 1937) was a British trade union leader.

Born in Burslem, Aucock completed an apprenticeship as a potter, and became active in trade unionism. He became an organiser for the National Society of Pottery Workers, and then won election as the union's president. He served on the Management Committee of the General Federation of Trade Unions, serving as its chair from 1932 until 1934, and then becoming a trustee of the organisation.

Aucock was a supporter of the Labour Party, and in 1921 he was elected to Stoke-on-Trent City Council. One of three councillors sponsored by the Pottery Workers, he took 75% of the vote, making his the safest seat in the city.

Trade union offices
Preceded by Charles Kean	Chair of the General Federation of Trade Unions; 1932–1934	Succeeded by William Saxon
