= National Union of Lock and Metal Workers =

Logo of the union

The National Union of Lock and Metal Workers (NULM) was a trade union representing workers involved in the manufacture of metal items in the United Kingdom.

The union was founded in 1889 in Willenhall as the National Amalgamated Lock, Latch and Key Smiths' Trade Society, soon renaming itself as the National Amalgamated Lock Maker and Metal Workers' Trade Society to better reflect its membership, which peaked at 2,000 in 1900, falling back to only 180 ten years later.

In 1890, the Wednesfield Spring Trap Makers' Society was established. Although it later dropped "Wednesfield" from its name and sought to recruit workers in the field elsewhere, its membership remained tiny, reaching a maximum of 126 in 1900, and declining to 68 in 1910. By 1924, it was close to dissolution but survived by formally associating with the Lock and Metal Workers, which took its final name of the "National Union of Lock and Metal Workers" the following year. The Spring Trap Makers' Society remained separately registered and separately affiliated to the Trades Union Congress, but its administration and leadership was combined with the Lock and Metal Workers.

The NULMW participated in the Joint Industry Council for the Lock, Latch and Key Industry, and grew significantly; although never a large union, it had 7,000 members by 1984.

The Spring Trap Makers' Society was moribund by the 1980s, existing only to deal with legacy matters for former workers in the industry. It was eventually dissolved in 1988. The NULMW eventually merged into the Transport and General Workers' Union in 2004.

== General Secretaries ==
1911: George Bellamy
1940: Bob Gerrard
1959: John Martin
1987: Michael Bradley
1991: Ray Ward
