= Power Loom Carpet Weavers' and Textile Workers' Union =

Former trade union of the United Kingdom

- Merged into: Iron and Steel Trades Confederation
- Founded: 1865
- Dissolved: 2000
- Headquarters: Callows Lane, Kidderminster
- Location: United Kingdom
- Members: 6,023 (1980)
- Affiliations: TUC, NACTU, Labour Party

The Power Loom Carpet Weavers' and Textile Workers' Union (PLCWTWU) was a trade union representing workers in the textile industry in the Kidderminster area of England.

The union was founded in 1865 and was initially named the Power Loom Brussels Carpet Weavers Defence Association. In its early days, it advocated for the emigration of unemployed carpet weavers, in order that they could find alternative work elsewhere, and competition in the industry would be reduced. This idea was soon abandoned, and in 1869 the union began admitting tapestry weavers in the area, changing its name to the Power Loom Carpet Weavers Mutual Defence and Provident Association.

In its early years, the union was very small, with only 588 members by the end of the 1860s. It focused on providing benefits for members who were unable to work, but did organise a strike in 1884. Its membership peaked at 1,384 in 1893, but then declined.

In 1917, the union began admitting women and textile workers outside carpet and tapestry weaving, changing its name to the Power Loom Carpet Weavers' and Textile Workers' Association. This produced a jump in membership, which reached 4,500 by the end of 1918, and remained fairly constant thereafter, peaking at 6,000 in 1980. The 1980s proved a difficult time for the union as the industry declined in the Kidderminster area, and membership had fallen to 2,300 by 1991. It changed its name slightly to the "Power Loom Carpet Weavers' and Textile Workers' Union" then, in 2000, it merged into the Iron and Steel Trades Confederation.
