= Yorkshire Society of Textile Craftsmen =

Former trade union of the United Kingdom

The Yorkshire Society of Textile Craftsmen (YSTC) was a trade union representing workers in a variety of textile work in Yorkshire.

== History ==
The union was established in 1952, when the Bradford and District Association of Warp Dressers, the Halifax and District Association of Warpdressers and the Huddersfield and District Worsted and Woollen Warpers' Association merged with the Yorkshire Warp Twisters' Society. The industry was already in decline and, by 1960, its membership was only 1,239. The Bradford and Halifax Associations had both held membership of the General Union of Lancashire and Yorkshire Warpdressers Association, and the YSTC continued its affiliation until 1970, when the General Union was dissolved.

== Mergers ==
A series of further amalgamations took place, with the Textile Daymen and Cloth Pattern Makers' Association joining in 1968 and the Leeds and District Warp Dressers, Twisters and Kindred Trades Association joining in 1975. Despite this, its membership fell to only 913 in 1978, and at the end of 1980, it merged into the National Union of Dyers, Bleachers and Textile Workers.

== General Secretaries ==
1952: J. H. Norris
1958: Clifford Hall
1976: Fred Towers
