= Newcastle upon Tyne Trades Union Council =

Trades council in Newcastle upon Tyne

The Newcastle upon Tyne Trades Union Council is a trades council bringing together trade unionists in Newcastle upon Tyne, in northern England.

== History ==
The council was founded on 18 January 1873 at the Flying Horse Inn on Groat Market, as the Newcastle Gateshead and District Trades and Labour Council. It hosted the Trades Union Congress (TUC) in 1876 at the Newcastle Mechanics' Institute, with John C. Laird, trades council president, serving as president of the congress. In 1883, the council sponsored Laird as a candidate for Newcastle Town Council, the first worker to stand, and he was elected, in Elswick.

The trades council's activities during the 1880s remain obscure, but in 1890 it organised the city's first May Day celebration. That year, it revised its rules, this version still existing. In 1891, it again hosted the TUC in the city.

During the 1926 UK general strike, the trades council helped co-ordinate workers in the city, as part of the Northumberland and Durham General Council Joint Strike Committee.

In the 1970s, the council set up the UK's first Centre Against Unemployment, this example leading to the establishment of a national network. In 1986, it moved into a building on Cloth Market, which also became the council's first ever dedicated headquarters.

== Leadership ==
=== Presidents ===
1873: Gibson (Patternmakers)
1870s: John Crawford Laird (Tailors)

1930s: Thomas Aisbitt
1935: Ernest Fernyhough (NUDAW)
Dave Atkinson (UPW)
1970s: G. Laraman
1980s: Ken Ternant
1986: Ron Taylor (NATFHE)
1988: Tommy Gardner (EETPU)
1989: Berit McFadden (NUT)
1989: Martin Spence (BECTU)
1992: Maureen Foster and Margaret Sharkey (MSF)
1995: Maureen Foster (MSF)
1997: Martin Levy (UCU)

=== General Secretaries ===
1873: G. Atkinson

1890s: T. Wilkinson

1940s: W. E. Myatt

1980s: Colin Randall
1986: Steve Manchee (NALGO)
1990: Ken Turnett (MSF)
1991: Peter Burnett (MSF)
1992: Martin Spence (BECTU)
1994: Jimmy Barnes (GPMU)
1995: Norman Anderson (Unison)
1996: Ron Taylor (NATFHE)
1997: Maureen Foster (MSF)
1998: Joe Scurfield (Equity)
2000: Peter Burnett (MSF)
2003: Jim Sipkin (Unite)
