= List of acts of the Parliament of the United Kingdom from 1939 =

This is a complete list of acts of the Parliament of the United Kingdom for the year 1939.

Note that the first parliament of the United Kingdom was held in 1801; parliaments between 1707 and 1800 were either parliaments of Great Britain or of Ireland). For acts passed up until 1707, see the list of acts of the Parliament of England and the list of acts of the Parliament of Scotland. For acts passed from 1707 to 1800, see the list of acts of the Parliament of Great Britain. See also the list of acts of the Parliament of Ireland.

For acts of the devolved parliaments and assemblies in the United Kingdom, see the list of acts of the Scottish Parliament, the list of acts of the Northern Ireland Assembly, and the list of acts and measures of Senedd Cymru; see also the list of acts of the Parliament of Northern Ireland.

The number shown after each act's title is its chapter number. Acts passed before 1963 are cited using this number, preceded by the year(s) of the reign during which the relevant parliamentary session was held; thus the Union with Ireland Act 1800 is cited as "39 & 40 Geo. 3. c. 67", meaning the 67th act passed during the session that started in the 39th year of the reign of George III and which finished in the 40th year of that reign. Note that the modern convention is to use Arabic numerals in citations (thus "41 Geo. 3" rather than "41 Geo. III"). Acts of the last session of the Parliament of Great Britain and the first session of the Parliament of the United Kingdom are both cited as "41 Geo. 3". Acts passed from 1963 onwards are simply cited by calendar year and chapter number.

== 2 & 3 Geo. 6 ==
Continuing the fourth session of the 37th Parliament of the United Kingdom, which met from 8 November 1938 until 23 November 1939.

This session was also traditionally cited as 2 & 3 G. 6.

=== Public general acts ===
Short title	Citation	Royal assent
Long title
Custody of Children (Scotland) Act 1939 (repealed)	2 & 3 Geo. 6. c. 4	28 February 1939
An Act to enable courts of law in Scotland to make orders as to the custody, maintenance and education of and access to minor children under the age of sixteen. (Repealed by Law Reform (Parent and Child) (Scotland) Act 1986 (c. 9))
Export Guarantees Act 1939 (repealed)	2 & 3 Geo. 6. c. 5	28 February 1939
An Act to extend the powers of the Board of Trade to give guarantees for the purpose of establishing or encouraging overseas trade. (Repealed by Export Guarantees Act 1949 (12, 13 & 14 Geo. 6. c. 14))
Czecho-Slovakia (Financial Assistance) Act 1939 (repealed)	2 & 3 Geo. 6. c. 6	28 February 1939
An Act to authorise the Treasury to repay to the Bank of England sums advanced by that Bank to the National Bank of Czecho-Slovakia together with interest thereon, and to enable effect to be given to an agreement made between His Majesty's Government in the United Kingdom and the Government of the Czecho-Slovak Republic and to an agreement made between His Majesty's said Government, the Government of the French Republic and the Government of the Czecho-Slovak Republic. (Repealed by Statute Law Revision Act 1958 (6 & 7 Eliz. 2. c. 46))
Currency and Bank Notes Act 1939 (repealed)	2 & 3 Geo. 6. c. 7	28 February 1939
An Act to amend the law with respect to the Issue Department of the Bank of England, the Exchange Equalisation Account and the issue and place of payment of Bank of England notes. (Repealed by National Loans Act 1968 (c. 13))
Defence Loans Act 1939 (repealed)	2 & 3 Geo. 6. c. 8	27 March 1939
An Act to amend the Defence Loans Act, 1937. (Note: Defence Loans Act 1937 (1 Edw. 8 & 1 Geo. 6. c. 13)) (Repealed by Statute Law Revision Act 1964 (c. 79))
Mining Industry (Welfare Fund) Act 1939 (repealed)	2 & 3 Geo. 6. c. 9	27 March 1939
An Act to amend section twenty of the Mining Industry Act, 1920, (Note: Mining Industry Act 1920 (10 & 11 Geo. 5. c. 50)) and the enactments amending that section. (Repealed by Miners' Welfare Act 1952 (15 & 16 Geo. 6 & 1 Eliz. 2. c. 23))
Bacon Industry (Amendment) Act 1939 (repealed)	2 & 3 Geo. 6. c. 10	27 March 1939
An Act to amend section twenty-eight, and subsection (3) of section nineteen, of the Bacon Industry Act, 1938. (Note: Bacon Industry Act 1938 (1 & 2 Geo. 6. c. 71)) (Repealed by Agriculture Act 1957 (5 & 6 Eliz. 2. c. 57))
Czecho-Slovakia (Restrictions on Banking Accounts, &c.) Act 1939 (repealed)	2 & 3 Geo. 6. c. 11	27 March 1939
An Act to postpone the making of payments out of certain banking accounts and certain transfers of securities and gold connected with the Czecho-Slovak Republic; and for purposes connected with the matters aforesaid. (Repealed by Statute Law (Repeals) Act 1989 (c. 43))
Consolidated Fund (No. 1) Act 1939 (repealed)	2 & 3 Geo. 6. c. 12	29 March 1939
An Act to apply certain sums out of the Consolidated Fund to the service of the years ending on the thirty-first day of March, one thousand nine hundred and thirty-eight, one thousand nine hundred and thirty-nine and one thousand nine hundred and forty. (Repealed by Statute Law Revision Act 1950 (14 Geo. 6. c. 6))
Cancer Act 1939	2 & 3 Geo. 6. c. 13	29 March 1939
An Act to make further provision for the treatment of cancer, to authorise the Minister of Health to lend money to the National Radium Trust, to prohibit certain advertisements relating to cancer, and for purposes connected with the matters aforesaid.
China (Currency Stabilisation) Act 1939 (repealed)	2 & 3 Geo. 6. c. 14	29 March 1939
An Act to facilitate the establishment of a fund to check undue fluctuations in the sterling value of the Chinese dollar. (Repealed by Statute Law Revision Act 1964 (c. 79))
Census of Production Act 1939 (repealed)	2 & 3 Geo. 6. c. 15	28 April 1939
An Act to amend the Census of Production Act, 1906. (Note: Census of Production Act 1906 (6 Edw. 7. c. 49)) (Repealed by Statistics of Trade Act 1947 (10 & 11 Geo. 6. c. 39))
Prevention of Fraud (Investments) Act 1939 (repealed)	2 & 3 Geo. 6. c. 16	28 April 1939
An Act to provide for regulating the business of dealing in securities; to restrict the registration of societies under the Industrial and Provident Societies Act, 1893, (Note: Industrial and Provident Societies Act 1893 (56 & 57 Vict. c. 39)) and confer on the registrar of building societies further powers in relation to such societies; to make general provision for preventing fraud in connection with dealings in investments; and to provide for purposes connected with the matters aforesaid. (Repealed by Prevention of Fraud (Investments) Act 1958 (6 & 7 Eliz. 2. c. 45))
Army and Air Force (Annual) Act 1939 (repealed)	2 & 3 Geo. 6. c. 17	28 April 1939
An Act to provide, during twelve months, for the discipline and regulation of the Army and the Air Force. (Repealed by Statute Law Revision Act 1950 (14 Geo. 6. c. 6), Statute Law Revision Act 1953 (2 & 3 Eliz. 2. c. 5) and Revision of the Army and Air Force Acts (Transitional Provisions) Act 1955 (3 & 4 Eliz. 2. c. 20))
Local Government Superannuation Act 1939 (repealed)	2 & 3 Geo. 6. c. 18	28 April 1939
An Act to amend the provisions of the Local Government Superannuation Act, 1937, (Note: Local Government Superannuation Act 1937 (1 Edw. 8 & 1 Geo. 6. c. 68)) and of the Local Government Superannuation (Scotland) Act, 1937, (Note: Local Government Superannuation (Scotland) Act 1937 (1 Edw. 8 & 1 Geo. 6. c. 69)) as to the local authorities to whom service must be rendered in order to constitute service for the purposes of those Acts respectively, to amend Part II of the First Schedule to the first-mentioned Act, and to provide for the admission to the benefits of that Act of certain employees of statutory undertakers who as such employees were entitled to the benefits of the Local Government and other Officers' Superannuation Act, 1922. (Note: Local Government and other Officers' Superannuation Act 1922 (12 & 13 Geo. 5. c. 59)) (Repealed by Superannuation Act 1972 (c. 11) and Local Government Superannuation Regulations 1974 (SI 1974/520))
Wild Birds (Duck and Geese) Protection Act 1939 (repealed)	2 & 3 Geo. 6. c. 19	25 May 1939
An Act to provide for the further protection of wild duck and wild geese. (Repealed by Protection of Birds Act 1954 (2 & 3 Eliz. 2. c. 30))
Reorganisation of Offices (Scotland) Act 1939	2 & 3 Geo. 6. c. 20	25 May 1939
An Act to provide for the transference of the functions of Scottish government departments to the Secretary of State, to make provision for the reorganisation of the General Board of Control for Scotland, and for purposes connected with the aforesaid matters.
Limitation Act 1939 (repealed)	2 & 3 Geo. 6. c. 21	25 May 1939
An Act to consolidate with amendments certain enactments relating to the limitation of actions and arbitrations. (Repealed by Limitation Act 1980 (c. 58))
Camps Act 1939	2 & 3 Geo. 6. c. 22	25 May 1939
An Act to promote and facilitate the construction, maintenance and management of camps of a permanent character. (Repealed for England and Wales by Statute Law (Repeals) Act 1973 (c. 39))
Public Health (Coal Mine Refuse) (Scotland) Act 1939 (repealed)	2 & 3 Geo. 6. c. 23	25 May 1939
An Act to amend the Public Health (Scotland) Act, 1897, (Note: Public Health (Scotland) Act 1897 (60 & 61 Vict. c. 38)) with respect to coal mine refuse liable to spontaneous combustion. (Repealed by Clean Air Act 1956 (4 & 5 Eliz. 2. c. 52))
Reserve and Auxiliary Forces Act 1939 (repealed)	2 & 3 Geo. 6. c. 24	25 May 1939
An Act to make further and temporary provision for enabling the reserve and auxiliary forces of the Crown to be called out for service as may be found necessary; and for purposes connected with the matter aforesaid. (Repealed by Statute Law Revision Act 1950 (14 Geo. 6. c. 6))
Military Training Act 1939 (repealed)	2 & 3 Geo. 6. c. 25	26 May 1939
An Act to make temporary provision for rendering persons between the ages of twenty and twenty-one years liable to undergo training in the armed forces of the Crown; and for purposes connected with the matter aforesaid. (Repealed by Statute Law Revision Act 1950 (14 Geo. 6. c. 6))
Charities (Fuel Allotments) Act 1939 (repealed)	2 & 3 Geo. 6. c. 26	13 July 1939
An Act to extend the powers of the Charity Commissioners as respects fuel allotments. (Repealed by Charities Act 1960 (8 & 9 Eliz. 2. c. 58))
Adoption of Children (Regulation) Act 1939 (repealed)	2 & 3 Geo. 6. c. 27	13 July 1939
An Act to regulate the making of arrangements by adoption societies and other persons in connection with the adoption of children; to provide for the supervision of adopted children by welfare authorities in certain cases; to restrict the making and receipt of payments in connection with the adoption of children; to amend section two of the Adoption of Children Act, 1926, (Note: Adoption of Children Act 1926 (16 & 17 Geo. 5. c. 29)) and section two of the Adoption of Children (Scotland) Act, 1930; (Note: Adoption of Children (Scotland) Act 1930 (20 & 21 Geo. 5. c. 37)) and for purposes connected with the matters aforesaid. (Repealed by Adoption Act 1950 (14 Geo. 6. c. 26))
Local Government Amendment (Scotland) Act 1939 (repealed)	2 & 3 Geo. 6. c. 28	13 July 1939
An Act to amend the law relating to the disqualification for membership of county, town and district councils in Scotland, and to make provision with regard to the disability of members of such councils in relation to contracts and other matters in which they have a pecuniary interest. (Repealed by Local Government (Scotland) Act 1947 (10 & 11 Geo. 6. c. 43))
Unemployment Insurance Act 1939 (repealed)	2 & 3 Geo. 6. c. 29	13 July 1939
An Act to amend the Unemployment Insurance Acts, 1935 to 1938, and to provide for the payment of contributions under the National Health Insurance Act, 1936, (Note: National Health Insurance Act 1936 (26 Geo. 5 & 1 Edw. 8. c. 32)) and the Widows', Orphans' and Old Age Contributory Pensions Act, 1936, (Note: Widows', Orphans' and Old Age Contributory Pensions Act 1936 (26 Geo. 5 & 1 Edw. 8. c. 33)) in respect of holiday periods. (Repealed for England and Wales and Scotland by Employment and Training Act 1948 (11 & 12 Geo. 6. c. 46) and for Northern Ireland by National Insurance Act (Northern Ireland) 1946 (c. 23 (N.I.)))
Access to Mountains Act 1939 (repealed)	2 & 3 Geo. 6. c. 30	13 July 1939
An Act to secure to the public access to mountains, moorlands and certain other land. (Repealed by National Parks and Access to the Countryside Act 1949 (12, 13 & 14 Geo. 6. c. 97))
Civil Defence Act 1939 (repealed)	2 & 3 Geo. 6. c. 31	13 July 1939
An Act to make further provision for civil defence and for purposes connected therewith. (Repealed by Civil Contingencies Act 2004 (c. 36))
Patents and Designs (Limits of Time) Act 1939 (repealed)	2 & 3 Geo. 6. c. 32	13 July 1939
An Act to amend certain provisions of the Patents and Designs Acts, 1907 to 1938, relating to time limits. (Repealed by Statute Law (Repeals) Act 1986 (c. 12))
Marriage Act 1939	2 & 3 Geo. 6. c. 33	13 July 1939
An Act to facilitate marriages in cases where one party resides in Scotland and the other in England and to make further provision as respects notices of marriage between parties one of whom resides in Scotland or England.
Marriage (Scotland) Act 1939 (repealed)	2 & 3 Geo. 6. c. 34	13 July 1939
An Act to amend the law relating to the constitution of marriage in Scotland. (Repealed by Marriage (Scotland) Act 1977 (c. 15))
Marriages Validity Act 1939 (repealed)	2 & 3 Geo. 6. c. 35	13 July 1939
An Act to remove doubts as to the validity of certain marriages. (Repealed by Marriage Act 1949 (12, 13 & 14 Geo. 6. c. 76))
Hall-marking of Foreign Plate Act 1939 (repealed)	2 & 3 Geo. 6. c. 36	13 July 1939
An Act to exempt foreign plate more than one hundred years old from assay, stamping and marking. (Repealed by Hallmarking Act 1973 (c. 43))
Wheat (Amendment) Act 1939 (repealed)	2 & 3 Geo. 6. c. 37	13 July 1939
An Act to amend the Wheat Act, 1932. (Note: Wheat Act 1932 (22 & 23 Geo. 5. c. 24)) (Repealed by Agriculture Act 1957 (5 & 6 Eliz. 2. c. 57))
Ministry of Supply Act 1939 (repealed)	2 & 3 Geo. 6. c. 38	13 July 1939
An Act to establish a Ministry of Supply and for purposes connected therewith. (Repealed by Supply Powers Act 1975 (c. 9))
Coast Protection Act 1939 (repealed)	2 & 3 Geo. 6. c. 39	13 July 1939
An Act to make further and better provision for the protection of the coast of Great Britain against erosion; and for other purposes connected with the matter aforesaid. (Repealed by Coast Protection Act 1949 (12, 13 & 14 Geo. 6. c. 74))
London Government Act 1939 (repealed)	2 & 3 Geo. 6. c. 40	13 July 1939
An Act to consolidate with amendments certain enactments relating to local government in London. (Repealed by London Government Act 1963 (c. 33))
Finance Act 1939	2 & 3 Geo. 6. c. 41	28 July 1939
An Act to grant certain duties of Customs and Inland Revenue (including Excise), to alter other duties, and to amend the law relating to Customs and Inland Revenue (including Excise) and the National Debt, and to make further provision in connection with finance.
Post Office & Telegraph (Money) Act 1939 (repealed)	2 & 3 Geo. 6. c. 42	28 July 1939
An Act to provide for raising further money for the development of the postal, telegraphic and telephonic systems, and for raising money for the purpose of repaying to the Post Office Fund lied thereout for such development. (Repealed by Post Office Act 1961 (9 & 10 Eliz. 2. c. 15))
Prevention of Damage by Rabbits Act 1939	2 & 3 Geo. 6. c. 43	28 July 1939
An Act to make provision for the prevention of damage by rabbits; and to amend the law relating to the use of poison and the use of spring traps above ground for the purpose of killing hares or rabbits.
House to House Collections Act 1939	2 & 3 Geo. 6. c. 44	28 July 1939
An Act to provide for the regulation of house to house collections for charitable purposes; and for matters connected therewith. (Repealed for Scotland by Civic Government (Scotland) Act 1982 (c. 45))
Mining Industry (Amendment) Act 1939 (repealed)	2 & 3 Geo. 6. c. 45	28 July 1939
An Act to remove the limitation imposed by subsection (2) of section five of the Mining Industry Act, 1920, upon the total amount of the salaries and remuneration of the staff and of the expenses of the Department of Mines in any year. (Repealed by Statute Law Revision Act 1953 (2 & 3 Eliz. 2. c. 5))
Milk Industry Act 1939 (repealed)	2 & 3 Geo. 6. c. 46	28 July 1939
An Act to authorise certain payments out of the Exchequer to milk marketing boards in respect of certain milk; to extend the powers and vary the duties of such boards as to the making of payments or allowances to producers of milk, and in connection with approved arrangements for the sale of milk at reduced prices, and as to the manner in which moneys paid to the boards from the Exchequer are to be dealt with; and to extend the functions of consumers' committees in relation to milk marketing schemes, milk product marketing schemes and milk product development schemes. (Repealed by Agricultural Marketing Act 1958 (6 & 7 Eliz. 2. c. 47))
Overseas Trade Guarantees Act 1939 (repealed)	2 & 3 Geo. 6. c. 47	28 July 1939
An Act to extend the powers of the Board of Trade to give guarantees for the purpose of establishing or encouraging overseas trade; to enable the Board to acquire and dispose of securities guaranteed by them under this Act or under the Export Guarantees Act, 1939, (Note: Export Guarantees Act 1939 (2 & 3 Geo. 6. c. 5)) and for purposes connected with the matters aforesaid. (Repealed by Export Guarantees Act 1949 (12, 13 & 14 Geo. 6. c. 14))
Agricultural Development Act 1939 (repealed)	2 & 3 Geo. 6. c. 48	28 July 1939
An Act to provide for securing farmers against low prices for oats, barley and fat sheep, and for securing a market for barley, for promoting the ploughing up in the year nineteen hundred and thirty-nine of grass land and rendering it fit for arable crops, for the establishment of a reserve of agricultural machinery, for increasing the resources of any company formed for such purposes as are mentioned in the Agricultural Credits Act, 1928, (Note: Agricultural Credits Act 1928 (18 & 19 Geo. 5. c. 43)) to amend the Agricultural Returns Act, 1925, (Note: Agricultural Returns Act 1925 (15 & 16 Geo. 5. c. 39)) and for purposes connected with the matters aforesaid. (Repealed by Statute Law (Repeals) Act 1986 (c. 12))
House of Commons Members' Fund Act 1939 (repealed)	2 & 3 Geo. 6. c. 49	28 July 1939
An Act to provide for the making, in certain cases, of grants to, and to the widows and to the children of, persons who have been members of the House of Commons; and for purposes connected with the matter aforesaid. (Repealed by House of Commons Members' Fund Act 2016 (c. 18))
Prevention of Violence (Temporary Provisions) Act 1939 (repealed)	2 & 3 Geo. 6. c. 50	28 July 1939
An Act to prevent the commission in Great Britain of further acts of violence designed to influence public opinion or Government policy with respect to Irish affairs; and to confer on the Secretary of State extraordinary powers in that behalf; and for purposes connected with the matters aforesaid. (Repealed by Statute Law (Repeals) Act 1973 (c. 39))
Public Trustee (General Deposit Fund) Act 1939	2 & 3 Geo. 6. c. 51	28 July 1939
An Act to amend the law with respect to the manner in which the public trustee may deal with certain trust moneys, to confirm the legality of certain dealings by the public trustee with such moneys and to require certain moneys in the hands of the public trustee to be paid into the Exchequer; and for purposes connected with the matters aforesaid.
Appropriation Act 1939 (repealed)	2 & 3 Geo. 6. c. 52	4 August 1939
An Act to apply a sum out of the Consolidated Fund to the service of the year ending on the thirty-first day of March, one thousand nine hundred and forty, and to appropriate the Supplies granted in this Session of Parliament. (Repealed by Statute Law Revision Act 1950 (14 Geo. 6. c. 6))
Isle of Man (Customs) Act 1939 (repealed)	2 & 3 Geo. 6. c. 53	4 August 1939
An Act to amend the law with respect to customs in the Isle of Man. (Repealed for the Isle of Man by Customs and Excise Legislation (Application) Order 1976 (GC No 1/76))
Cotton Industry (Reorganisation) Act 1939 (repealed)	2 & 3 Geo. 6. c. 54	4 August 1939
An Act to make provision for the better organisation of the cotton industry and certain industries related thereto; and for purposes connected with the matter aforesaid. (Repealed by Industrial Organisation and Development Act 1947 (10 & 11 Geo. 6. c. 40))
Building Societies Act 1939 (repealed)	2 & 3 Geo. 6. c. 55	4 August 1939
An Act to declare and amend the law as to the making of advances by building societies, as to the security taken for advances made by such societies, as to the payment of commissions in connection with the business of such societies and as to the liability of persons concerned in the administration of such societies; and for purposes connected with the matters aforesaid. (Repealed by Building Societies Act 1962 (10 & 11 Eliz. 2. c. 37))
Riding Establishments Act 1939 (repealed)	2 & 3 Geo. 6. c. 56	4 August 1939
An Act to provide for the inspection of riding establishments; and for other purposes connected therewith. (Repealed by Riding Establishments Act 1964 (c. 70))
War Risks Insurance Act 1939 (repealed)	2 & 3 Geo. 6. c. 57	4 August 1939
An Act to make provision for authorising the Board of Trade, in the event of war and in other circumstances, to undertake the insurance of ships and other goods; for the payment by the Board of Trade, in time of war, of compensation in respect of goods lost or damaged in transit; for requiring persons to insure goods against certain risks in time of war; and for purposes connected with the matters aforesaid. (Repealed by Statute Law (Repeals) Act 1981 (c. 19))
Public Health (Coal Mine Refuse) Act 1939 (repealed)	2 & 3 Geo. 6. c. 58	4 August 1939
An Act to amend the Public Health Act, 1936, (Note: Public Health Act 1936 (26 Geo. 5 & 1 Edw. 8. c. 49) with respect to coal mine refuse liable to spontaneous combustion. (Repealed by Clean Air Act 1956 (4 & 5 Eliz. 2. c. 52))
Air Ministry (Heston and Kenley Aerodromes Extension) Act 1939	2 & 3 Geo. 6. c. 59	4 August 1939
An Act to provide for the acquisition by the Secretary of State for Air of certain land in Middlesex, and for the stopping up of certain highways in Middlesex and Surrey; to confirm an agreement between the Mayor and Commonalty and Citizens of the City of London and the Secretary of State for Air relating to the extension of the site of Kenley Aerodrome; and for purposes connected with the matters aforesaid.
Senior Public Elementary Schools (Liverpool) Act 1939 (repealed)	2 & 3 Geo. 6. c. 60	4 August 1939
An Act to facilitate the provision in Liverpool of public elementary school accommodation for senior children. (Repealed by Education Act 1944 (7 & 8 Geo. 6. c. 31))
British Overseas Airways Act 1939 (repealed)	2 & 3 Geo. 6. c. 61	4 August 1939
An Act to provide for the establishment of a corporation to be known as the British Overseas Airways Corporation; to facilitate the acquisition by that Corporation of certain air transport undertakings; to make further and better provision for the operation of air transport services, and for purposes connected with the matters aforesaid. (Repealed by Air Corporations Act 1949 (12, 13 & 14 Geo. 6. c. 91))
Emergency Powers (Defence) Act 1939 (repealed)	2 & 3 Geo. 6. c. 62	24 August 1939
An Act to confer on His Majesty certain powers which it is expedient that His Majesty should be enabled to exercise in the present emergency; and to make further provision for purposes connected with the defence of the realm. (Repealed by Emergency Laws (Repeal) Act 1959 (7 & 8 Eliz. 2. c. 19))
Appropriation (No. 2) Act 1939 (repealed)	2 & 3 Geo. 6. c. 63	1 September 1939
An Act to apply a sum out of the Consolidated Fund to the service of the year ending on the thirty-first day of March, one thousand nine hundred and forty, and to appropriate the further Supplies granted in this Session of Parliament. (Repealed by Statute Law Revision Act 1950 (14 Geo. 6. c. 6))
Currency (Defence) Act 1939 (repealed)	2 & 3 Geo. 6. c. 64	1 September 1939
An Act to amend the law with respect to the application and financing of the Exchange Equalisation Account; to make postal orders and certain bank notes temporarily legal tender; and to make provision with respect to certain loans granted by the Bank of England. (Repealed by National Loans Act 1968 (c. 13))
Prize Act 1939	2 & 3 Geo. 6. c. 65	1 September 1939
An Act to apply prize law to aircraft; to amend and explain the enactments relating to prize; and to provide for purposes connected with the matters aforesaid.
Government of India Act (Amendment) Act 1939 (repealed)	2 & 3 Geo. 6. c. 66	1 September 1939
An Act to amend the Government of India Act, 1935. (Note: Government of India Act 1935 (26 Geo. 5 & 1 Edw. 8. c. 2)) (Repealed by Statute Law (Repeals) Act 1976 (c. 16))
Courts (Emergency Powers) Act 1939 (repealed)	2 & 3 Geo. 6. c. 67	1 September 1939
An Act to confer on courts certain powers in relation to remedies in respect of the nonpayment of money and the non-performance of obligations (including powers in relation to bankruptcy and winding-up proceedings), and to make provision for purposes connected with the matters aforesaid. (Repealed for Scotland by Courts (Emergency Powers) (Scotland) Act 1939 (2 & 3 Geo. 6. c. 113) (Note: Incorrectly cited as "Cts (Emergency Powers) (S), 1939 c 113, s 4(1)" in the Chronological Table of the Statutes.) and for England and Wales and Northern Ireland by Courts (Emergency Powers) Act 1943 (6 & 7 Geo. 6. c. 19))
Armed Forces (Conditions of Service) Act 1939 (repealed)	2 & 3 Geo. 6. c. 68	1 September 1939
An Act to amend the law with respect to the conditions of service of members of the armed forces of the Crown. (Repealed by Navy, Army and Air Force Reserves Act 1954 (2 & 3 Eliz. 2. c. 10))
Import, Export and Customs Powers (Defence) Act 1939	2 & 3 Geo. 6. c. 69	1 September 1939
An Act to provide for controlling the importation, exportation and carriage coastwise of goods and the shipment of goods as ships' stores; to provide for facilitating the enforcement of the law relating to the matters aforesaid and the law relating to trading with the enemy; and to provide for purposes connected with the matters aforesaid.
Ships and Aircraft (Transfer Restriction) Act 1939 (repealed)	2 & 3 Geo. 6. c. 70	1 September 1939
An Act to impose restrictions on certain transactions in respect of ships and aircraft and parts of aircraft; and for purposes connected with the matter aforesaid. (Repealed by Statute Law (Repeals) Act 1977 (c. 18))
Rent and Mortgage Interest Restrictions Act 1939 (repealed)	2 & 3 Geo. 6. c. 71	1 September 1939
An Act to continue and amend the Rent and Mortgage Interest Restrictions Acts, 1920 to 1938. (Repealed for England and Wales by Rent Act 1968 (c. 23) and for Scotland by Rent (Scotland) Act 1971 (c. 28) (Note: Incorrectly cited as "Rent (S), 1931 c 28" in the Chronological Table of the Statutes.))
Landlord and Tenant (War Damage) Act 1939	2 & 3 Geo. 6. c. 72	1 September 1939
An Act to modify the rights and liabilities of landlords, tenants and other persons interested in land damaged by war.
Housing (Emergency Powers) Act 1939 (repealed)	2 & 3 Geo. 6. c. 73	1 September 1939
An Act to empower local authorities to make fit for housing purposes buildings damaged by war, and for purposes connected therewith. (Repealed by Statute Law (Repeals) Act 1981 (c. 19))
Essential Buildings and Plant (Repair of War Damage) Act 1939 (repealed)	2 & 3 Geo. 6. c. 74	1 September 1939
An Act to provide for the repair of buildings used for purposes essential to the welfare of the civil population, and the reinstatement of the plant of undertakings carried on for such purposes, where the buildings or plant are damaged by war. (Repealed by Emergency Laws (Transitional Provisions) Act 1946 (9 & 10 Geo. 6. c. 26))
Compensation (Defence) Act 1939	2 & 3 Geo. 6. c. 75	1 September 1939
An Act to provide for compensation in respect of action taken on behalf of His Majesty in the exercise of certain emergency powers; and for purposes connected with the matter aforesaid.
Regional Commissioners Act 1939 (repealed)	2 & 3 Geo. 6. c. 76	1 September 1939
An Act to make provision with respect to Regional Commissioners and other persons appointed for the purpose of securing the co-ordination of measures of civil defence. (Repealed by Statute Law Revision Act 1950 (14 Geo. 6. c. 6))
Ministers of the Crown (Emergency Appointments) Act 1939 (repealed)	2 & 3 Geo. 6. c. 77	1 September 1939
An Act to make provision with respect to Ministers appointed in connection with the prosecution of war. (Repealed by Ministers of the Crown and House of Commons Disqualification Act 1942 (5 & 6 Geo. 6. c. 11) and House of Commons Disqualification Act 1957 (5 & 6 Eliz. 2. c. 20))
Administration of Justice (Emergency Provisions) Act 1939 (repealed)	2 & 3 Geo. 6. c. 78	1 September 1939
An Act to provide for the modification of the law relating to the administration of justice in the event of the outbreak or probability of war, and for purposes connected therewith. (Repealed by Statute Law Revision Act 1950 (14 Geo. 6. c. 6))
Administration of Justice (Emergency Provisions) (Scotland) Act 1939 (repealed)	2 & 3 Geo. 6. c. 79	1 September 1939
An Act to provide for the modification of the law relating to the administration of justice in Scotland in the event of the outbreak or imminence of war and for purposes connected therewith. (Repealed by Statute Law Revision Act 1950 (14 Geo. 6. c. 6))
War Damage to Land (Scotland) Act 1939	2 & 3 Geo. 6. c. 80	1 September 1939
An Act to modify the rights and liabilities of persons interested in and in Scotland damaged by war.
National Service (Armed Forces) Act 1939 (repealed)	2 & 3 Geo. 6. c. 81	3 September 1939
An Act to make provision for securing and controlling the enlistment of men for service in the armed forces of the Crown; and for purposes connected with the matter aforesaid. (Repealed by National Service Act 1948 (11 & 12 Geo. 6. c. 64) and Navy, Army and Air Force Reserves Act 1954 (2 & 3 Eliz. 2. c. 10))
Personal Injuries (Emergency Provisions) Act 1939	2 & 3 Geo. 6. c. 82	3 September 1939
An Act to make provision as respects certain personal injuries sustained during the period of the present emergency.
Pensions (Navy, Army, Air Force and Mercantile Marine) Act 1939	2 & 3 Geo. 6. c. 83	3 September 1939
An Act to make provision for the transfer to the Minister of Pensions of powers and duties with respect to pensions and grants vested in certain Naval, Military and Air Force authorities, to amend section nine of the War Pensions (Administrative Provisions) Act, 1918, (Note: War Pensions (Administrative Provisions) Act 1918 (8 & 9 Geo. 5. c. 57)) to make provision for awards in respect of war injuries to, and the detention of, mariners and other seafaring persons and war damage to their effects, and for purposes connected with the matters aforesaid.
National Health Insurance and Contributory Pensions (Emergency Provisions) Act 1939 (repealed)	2 & 3 Geo. 6. c. 84	3 September 1939
An Act to amend the law relating to national health insurance as respects the period of the present emergency, and to amend the law relating to widows', orphans' and old age contributory pensions as respects that period and as respects provisions against double pensions. (Repealed for England and Wales and Scotland by National Insurance Act 1946 (9 & 10 Geo. 6. c. 67) and for Northern Ireland by National Insurance Act (Northern Ireland) 1946 (c. 23 (N.I.)))
House of Commons (Service in His Majesty's Forces) Act 1939 (repealed)	2 & 3 Geo. 6. c. 85	3 September 1939
An Act to prevent membership of any of His Majesty's Forces being a disqualification for membership of the Commons House of Parliament. (Repealed by Statute Law Revision Act 1953 (2 & 3 Eliz. 2. c. 5))
Isle of Man (War Legislation) Act 1939 (repealed)	2 & 3 Geo. 6. c. 86	3 September 1939
An Act to enable His Majesty by Order in Council to extend to the Isle of Man Acts passed for purposes connected with the defence of the Realm. (Repealed by Statute Law (Repeals) Act 1973 (c. 39))
Navy and Marines (Wills) Act 1939 (repealed)	2 & 3 Geo. 6. c. 87	5 September 1939
An Act to enable the Admiralty to dispense, in certain cases, with the requirements of section five of the Navy and Marines (Wills) Act, 1865. (Note: Navy and Marines (Wills) Act 1865 (28 & 29 Vict. c. 72)) (Repealed by Navy and Marines (Wills) Act 1953 (1 & 2 Eliz. 2. c. 24))
Royal Marines Act 1939 (repealed)	2 & 3 Geo. 6. c. 88	5 September 1939
An Act to provide for the prolongation of the service of men of the Royal Marine forces. (Repealed by Revision of the Army and Air Force Acts (Transitional Provisions) Act 1955 (3 & 4 Eliz. 2. c. 20))
Trading with the Enemy Act 1939	2 & 3 Geo. 6. c. 89	5 September 1939
An Act to impose penalties for trading with the enemy, to make provision as respects the property of enemies and enemy subjects, and for purposes connected with the matters aforesaid.
Military and Air Forces (Prolongation of Service) Act 1939 (repealed)	2 & 3 Geo. 6. c. 90	5 September 1939
An Act to provide for the prolongation of the service of certain men serving in the armed forces of the Crown. (Repealed by Navy, Army and Air Force Reserves Act 1954 (2 & 3 Eliz. 2. c. 10))
National Registration Act 1939 (repealed)	2 & 3 Geo. 6. c. 91	5 September 1939
An Act to make provision for the establishment of a National Register, for the issue of identity cards, and for purposes connected with the matters aforesaid. (Repealed by Statute Law Revision Act 1953 (2 & 3 Eliz. 2. c. 5))
Unemployment Insurance (Emergency Powers) Act 1939 (repealed)	2 & 3 Geo. 6. c. 92	5 September 1939
An Act to empower the Minister of Labour in case of war to modify or suspend the operation of any of the provisions of the Unemployment Insurance Acts, 1935 to 1939, and make provision with respect to any of the matters to which the said Acts relate, and for purposes connected with the matters aforesaid. (Repealed for England and Wales and Scotland by National Insurance Act 1946 (9 & 10 Geo. 6. c. 67) and for Northern Ireland by National Insurance Act (Northern Ireland) 1946 (c. 23 (N.I.)))
Unemployment Assistance (Emergency Powers) Act 1939 (repealed)	2 & 3 Geo. 6. c. 93	5 September 1939
An Act to empower the Minister of Labour in case of war to extend the Unemployment Assistance Act, 1934, (Note: Unemployment Act 1934 (24 & 25 Geo. 5. c. 29)) to additional classes of persons, and to modify or suspend any of the provisions of the said Act, and to make provision for the payment of allowances in an emergency. (Repealed by National Assistance Act 1948 (11 & 12 Geo. 6. c. 29))
Local Government Staffs (War Service) Act 1939 (repealed)	2 & 3 Geo. 6. c. 94	5 September 1939
An Act to make provision with respect to the war service of clerks and deputy clerks of the peace, coroners and persons employed by local and public authorities and certain undertakers, and to prevent persons being disqualified for membership of a local authority by reason of employment in civil defence service or being disqualified for such employment by reason of such membership. (Repealed by Statute Law (Repeals) Act 1975 (c. 10))
Teachers Superannuation (War Service) Act 1939 (repealed)	2 & 3 Geo. 6. c. 95	5 September 1939
An Act to enable war service to be treated as contributory service, approved external service or qualifying service for the purpose of the Teachers (Superannuation) Acts, 1918 to 1937, and for purposes connected therewith. (Repealed by Teachers' Superannuation Act 1965 (c. 83))
Education (Scotland) (War Service Superannuation) Act 1939	2 & 3 Geo. 6. c. 96	5 September 1939
An Act to enable war service to be treated as service under any scheme framed in pursuance of the Education (Scotland) (Superannuation) Acts, 1919 to 1937.
Import Duties (Emergency Provisions) Act 1939 (repealed)	2 & 3 Geo. 6. c. 97	7 September 1939
An Act to make temporary provision for the exercise of powers, which are exercisable on the recommendation of the Import Duties Advisory Committee, without any such recommendation, and for the extension of certain powers of the Treasury and the Board of Trade in relation to duties of customs and excise and drawbacks thereof, and for purposes connected with the matters aforesaid. (Repealed by Import Duties Act 1958 (6 & 7 Eliz. 2. c. 6))
Sheriff Courts (Scotland) Act 1939 (repealed)	2 & 3 Geo. 6. c. 98	7 September 1939
An Act to amend the provisions of the Sheriff Courts (Scotland) Act, 1907, (Note: Sheriff Courts (Scotland) Act 1907 (7 Edw. 7. c. 51)) with regard to leave of absence to salaried sheriffs-substitute. (Repealed by Sheriff Courts (Scotland) Act 1971 (c. 58))
Income Tax Procedure (Emergency Provisions) Act 1939 (repealed)	2 & 3 Geo. 6. c. 99	7 September 1939
An Act to make temporary provision for the performance by other Commissioners or persons of any of the functions of the General Commissioners, the Additional Commissioners, or the Assessor for any division, area or parish. (Repealed by Statute Law Revision Act 1950 (14 Geo. 6. c. 6))
Government and other Stocks (Emergency Provisions) Act 1939	2 & 3 Geo. 6. c. 100	7 September 1939
An Act to make temporary provision for rendering inscribed stocks transferable by instrument in writing, and for extending, in certain circumstances arising from war, the time limited by the National Debt Act, 1870, (Note: National Debt Act 1870 (33 & 34 Vict. c. 71)) for the payment of coupons.
Exchequer and Audit Departments (Temporary Provisions) Act 1939 (repealed)	2 & 3 Geo. 6. c. 101	7 September 1939
An Act to authorise issues and transfers from the Consolidated Fund of the United Kingdom without the grant of credits by the Comptroller and Auditor-General, and to suspend the necessity for the countersignature by or on behalf of the Comptroller and Auditor-General to warrants authorising the issue of Treasury bills. (Repealed by Emergency Laws (Transitional Provisions) Act 1946 (9 & 10 Geo. 6. c. 26))
Liability for War Damage (Miscellaneous Provisions) Act 1939	2 & 3 Geo. 6. c. 102	7 September 1939
An Act to modify certain rights and liabilities with respect to goods lost or damaged by war.
Police and Firemen (War Service) Act 1939 (repealed)	2 & 3 Geo. 6. c. 103	7 September 1939
An Act to make provision with respect to constables and firemen serving in His Majesty's forces during the period of the present emergency, to suspend the right of constables and firemen to retire on pension during that period, to provide that war injuries shall be deemed to be nonaccidental injuries for the purpose of enactments and other instruments relating to the pensions of constables and firemen, to amend section sixteen of the Fire Brigade Pensions Act, 1925, (Note: Fire Brigade Pensions Act 1925 (15 & 16 Geo. 5. c. 47)) and for purposes connected with the matters aforesaid. (Repealed by Statute Law (Repeals) Act 2008 (c. 12))
Control of Employment Act 1939 (repealed)	2 & 3 Geo. 6. c. 104	21 September 1939
An Act to confer on the Minister of Labour and National Service powers with respect to the control of employment during the present emergency; and for purposes connected with the matter aforesaid. (Repealed by Statute Law Revision Act 1950 (14 Geo. 6. c. 6))
Administration of Justice (Emergency Provisions) (Northern Ireland) Act 1939 (repealed)	2 & 3 Geo. 6. c. 105	21 September 1939
An Act to provide for the modification of the law relating to the administration of justice in Northern Ireland as respects the period of the present emergency and for purposes connected therewith. (Repealed by Statute Law Revision Act 1950 (14 Geo. 6. c. 6))
Universities and Colleges (Emergency Provisions) Act 1939 (repealed)	2 & 3 Geo. 6. c. 106	21 September 1939
An Act to provide, in connexion with the present emergency, for amending the Universities and College Estates Act, 1925, (Note: Universities and College Estates Act 1925 (15 & 16 Geo. 5. c. 24)) and for extending the powers of the Universities of Oxford and Cambridge and the Colleges therein to make statutes. (Repealed by Statute Law Revision Act 1950 (14 Geo. 6. c. 6))
Patents, Designs, Copyright and Trade Marks (Emergency) Act 1939	2 & 3 Geo. 6. c. 107	21 September 1939
An Act to make such special provision with respect to patents, registered designs, copyright and trade marks, as is expedient to meet any emergency which may arise as a result of war.
Possession of Mortgaged Land (Emergency Provisions) Act 1939 (repealed)	2 & 3 Geo. 6. c. 108	21 September 1939
An Act to restrict the rights of mortgagees to obtain possession of mortgaged land; and to amend the Courts (Emergency Powers) Act, 1939. (Note: Courts (Emergency Powers) Act 1939 (2 & 3 Geo. 6. c. 67)) (Repealed by Courts (Emergency Powers) Act 1943 (6 & 7 Geo. 6. c. 19))
Finance (No. 2) Act 1939 (repealed)	2 & 3 Geo. 6. c. 109	12 October 1939
An Act to increase certain duties of customs and excise; to increase the standard rate of income tax for the year 1939-40 and the higher rates of income tax for the year 1938-39 and to make certain other amendments in the Income Tax Acts; to increase the rates of estate duty; to impose an excess profits tax; and for purposes connected with the matters aforesaid. (Repealed by Statute Law (Repeals) Act 2008 (c. 12))
Solicitors (Disciplinary Committee) Act 1939 (repealed)	2 & 3 Geo. 6. c. 110	12 October 1939
An Act to amend the provisions of the Solicitors Act, 1932, (Note: Solicitors Act 1932 (22 & 23 Geo. 5. c. 37)) relative to the Disciplinary Committee. (Repealed by Solicitors Act 1957 (5 & 6 Eliz. 2. c. 27))
Education (Emergency) Act 1939 (repealed)	2 & 3 Geo. 6. c. 111	12 October 1939
An Act to modify the provisions of the Education Act, 1936, (Note: Education Act 1936 (26 Geo. 5 & 1 Edw. 8. c. 41)) in relation to the coming into operation of sections one to six of that Act, and for purposes connected with the said modification. (Repealed by Education Act 1944 (7 & 8 Geo. 6. c. 31))
Education (Emergency) (Scotland) Act 1939 (repealed)	2 & 3 Geo. 6. c. 112	12 October 1939
An Act to modify the provisions of the Education (Scotland) Act, 1936, (Note: Education (Scotland) Act 1936 (26 Geo. 5 & 1 Edw. 8. c. 42)) in relation to the coming into operation of section fourteen of the Education (Scotland) Act, 1918, and for purposes connected with the said modification. (Repealed by Statute Law (Repeals) Act 1971 (c. 52))
Courts (Emergency Powers) (Scotland) Act 1939 (repealed)	2 & 3 Geo. 6. c. 113	12 October 1939
An Act to confer on courts in Scotland certain powers in relation to remedies in respect of the non-payment of money and the non-performance of obligations (including powers in relation to bankruptcy and winding-up proceedings) and to make provision for purposes connected with the matters aforesaid. (Repealed by Statute Law Revision Act 1950 (14 Geo. 6. c. 6) and Statute Law Revision Act 1953 (2 & 3 Eliz. 2. c. 5))
Execution of Trusts (Emergency Provisions) Act 1939 (repealed)	2 & 3 Geo. 6. c. 114	12 October 1939
An Act to facilitate the execution of trusts during the period of the present emergency. (Repealed by Statute Law (Repeals) Act 1973 (c. 39))
Local Elections and Register of Electors (Temporary Provisions) Act 1939 (repealed)	2 & 3 Geo. 6. c. 115	31 October 1939
An Act to postpone elections of local authorities, to postpone the preparation of the register of electors, to suspend certain powers relating to the alteration of the areas or of the constitution of local authorities, and for purposes connected with the matters aforesaid. (Repealed for England and Wales and Scotland by Representation of the People Act 1945 (8 & 9 Geo. 6. c. 5) and for Northern Ireland by Statute Law Revision Act 1953 (2 & 3 Eliz. 2. c. 5))
Cotton Industry (Reorganisation) (Postponement) Act 1939 (repealed)	2 & 3 Geo. 6. c. 116	31 October 1939
An Act to postpone the operation of the Cotton Industry (Reorganisation) Act, 1939. (Note: Cotton Industry (Reorganisation) Act 1939 (2 & 3 Geo. 6. c. 54)) (Repealed by Industrial Organisation and Development Act 1947 (10 & 11 Geo. 6. c. 40))
National Loans Act 1939	2 & 3 Geo. 6. c. 117	16 November 1939
An Act to confer on the Treasury powers to raise money and exchange securities, and for purposes connected therewith.
Prices of Goods Act 1939 (repealed)	2 & 3 Geo. 6. c. 118	16 November 1939
An Act to prevent the price of goods of such descriptions as may be specified by the Board of Trade being raised above a basic price for those goods by more than an amount referable to increases in certain specified expenses, and for purposes consequential thereon and incidental thereto. (Repealed by Goods and Services (Price Control) Act 1941 (4 & 5 Geo. 6. c. 31) and Statute Law Revision Act 1953 (2 & 3 Eliz. 2. c. 5))
Chartered and Other Bodies (Temporary Provisions) Act 1939 (repealed)	2 & 3 Geo. 6. c. 119	16 November 1939
An Act to make provision for promoting economy and efficiency in the carrying on under war conditions of the work of certain chartered and other bodies not being local authorities; for enabling certain Universities and colleges to adapt themselves to war conditions; and for purposes connected with the matters aforesaid. (Repealed by Statute Law (Repeals) Act 1971 (c. 52))
Restriction of Advertisement (War Risks Insurance) Act 1939	2 & 3 Geo. 6. c. 120	23 November 1939
An Act to restrict the distribution of circulars, and the publication of advertisements, relating to the insurance of property against war risks, to provide for the imposition of certain conditions and requirements in cases where permission for such distribution or publication is granted, and for purposes connected with the matters aforesaid.
Official Secrets Act 1939	2 & 3 Geo. 6. c. 121	23 November 1939
An Act to amend section six of the Official Secrets Act, 1920. (Note: Official Secrets Act 1920 (10 & 11 Geo. 5. c. 75))

=== Local acts ===
Short title	Citation	Royal assent
Long title
Kirkcaldy Corporation Order Confirmation Act 1939	2 & 3 Geo. 6. c. vi	27 March 1939
An Act to confirm a Provisional Order under the Private Legislation Procedure (Scotland) Act 1936 (Note: Private Legislation Procedure (Scotland) Act 1936 (26 Geo. 5 & 1 Edw. 8. c. 52)) relating to Kirkcaldy Corporation.
	Kirkcaldy Corporation Order 1939 Provisional Order to extend the boundaries of the royal burgh of Kirkcaldy to extend the limits of compulsory water supply to consolidate with amendments the Acts and Orders of or relating to the burgh and the gas electricity harbour water and omnibus undertakings thereof to confer further powers with respect to such undertakings and for other purposes.	
Ministry of Health Provisional Order Confirmation (South Staffordshire Joint Hospital District) Act 1939	2 & 3 Geo. 6. c. vii	27 March 1939
An Act to confirm a Provisional Order of the Minister of Health relating to the South Staffordshire Joint Hospital District.
	South Staffordshire Joint Hospital Order 1938 (Note: Although passed in 1939, the short title is specified as the South Staffordshire Joint Hospital Order 1938.) Provisional order forming a united district under section 6 of the Public Health Act 1936. (Note: Public Health Act 1936 (26 Geo. 5 & 1 Edw. 8. c. 49))	
Ministry of Health Provisional Order Confirmation (Blackburn) Act 1939 (repealed)	2 & 3 Geo. 6. c. viii	27 March 1939
An Act to confirm a Provisional Order of the Minister of Health relating to the borough of Blackburn. (Repealed by County of Lancashire Act 1984 (c. xxi))
	Blackburn Order 1938 (Note: Although passed in 1939, the short title is specified as the Blackburn Order 1938.) Provisional order amending certain local Acts and provisional orders.	
Ministry of Health Provisional Order Confirmation (Hastings) Act 1939 (repealed)	2 & 3 Geo. 6. c. ix	27 March 1939
An Act to confirm a Provisional Order of the Minister of Health relating to the borough of Hasting. (Repealed by East Sussex Act 1981 (c. xxv))
	Hastings Order 1939 Provisional order altering a local act. (Note: Hastings Corporation (General Powers) Act 1937 (1 Edw. 8 & 1 Geo. 6. c. lxxviii))	
Ministry of Health Provisional Order Confirmation (Leyton) Act 1939 (repealed)	2 & 3 Geo. 6. c. x	27 March 1939
An Act to confirm a Provisional Order of the Minister of Health relating to the borough of Leyton. (Repealed by Local Law (North East London Boroughs) Order 1965 (SI 1965/510))
	Leyton Order 1939 Provisional Order amending certain local Acts.	
Ministry of Health Provisional Order Confirmation (Luton Extension) Act 1939 (repealed)	2 & 3 Geo. 6. c. xi	27 March 1939
An Act to confirm a Provisional Order of the Minister of Health relating to the borough of Luton. (Repealed by Luton Borough Council Act 1985 (c. xi))
	Luton (Extension) Order 1939 Provisional Order made in pursuance of the Local Government Act 1933 (Note: Local Government Act 1933 (23 & 24 Geo. 5. c. 51)) for altering borough boundaries.	
Maryport Harbour Act 1939	2 & 3 Geo. 6. c. xii	27 March 1939
An Act to make provision in regard to the finance of the commissioners for the Harbour of Maryport and for other purposes.
Ministry of Health Provisional Order Confirmation (Colchester) Act 1939 (repealed)	2 & 3 Geo. 6. c. xiii	28 April 1939
An Act to confirm a Provisional Order of the Minister of Health relating to the borough of Colchester. (Repealed by Essex Act 1987 (c. xx))
	Colchester Order 1939 Provisional Order for partially repealing a local Act. (Note: Colchester Town, Port and Navigation Act 1847 (10 & 11 Vict. c. cclxxxi))	
Ministry of Health Provisional Order Confirmation (Newbury) Act 1939 (repealed)	2 & 3 Geo. 6. c. xiv	28 April 1939
An Act to confirm a Provisional Order of the Minister of Health relating to the borough of Newbury. (Repealed by Reading and Berkshire Water, &c. Act 1959 (7 & 8 Eliz. 2. c. xxxiii))
	Newbury Order 1939 Provisional order altering a local Act (Note: Newbury Corporation Act 1925 (15 & 16 Geo. 5. c. c)) and a provisional order.	
Exeter Extension Act 1939 (repealed)	2 & 3 Geo. 6. c. xv	28 April 1939
An Act to extend the boundaries of the city and county of the city of Exeter and for other purposes. (Repealed by Exeter City Council Act 1987 (c. xi))
Conway Gas Act 1939	2 & 3 Geo. 6. c. xvi	25 May 1939
An Act to extend the limits of supply of the Conway Gas Company Limited and for other purposes.
All Hallows Lombard Street Act 1939	2 & 3 Geo. 6. c. xvii	25 May 1939
An Act to confer upon the Ecclesiastical Commissioners and other persons powers with reference to the churchyards appurtenant to the church of All Hallows Lombard Street in the city of London to provide for the extinguishment of rights of way and other rights over or in respect of certain lands to empower the said Commissioners to sell the said lands and for other purposes.
Northmet Power Act 1939	2 & 3 Geo. 6. c. xviii	25 May 1939
An Act to confer further powers on and to change the name of the North Metropolitan Electric Power Supply Company and for other purposes.
Wear Navigation and Sunderland Dock Act 1939 (repealed)	2 & 3 Geo. 6. c. xix	25 May 1939
An Act to confer further powers on the River Wear Commissioners and for other purposes. (Repealed by Sunderland Corporation Act 1972 (c. xxiii) (Note: Incorrectly cited as "Sunderland Corpn. 1972 (c.xxii)" in the Chronological Table of Local Acts.))
Mumbles Pier Act 1939	2 & 3 Geo. 6. c. xx	25 May 1939
An Act to confer further powers on the South Wales Transport Company Limited with respect to their Mumbles pier undertaking and for other purposes.
City of London (Various Powers) Act 1939	2 & 3 Geo. 6. c. xxi	25 May 1939
An Act to confer borrowing powers on the corporation of London as port health authority of the Port of London to amend the Public Health (London) Act 1936 to vary the financial powers of the Corporation to make provision as to legal quays and election expenses and for other purposes.
London and North Eastern Railway (Superannuation Fund) Act 1939	2 & 3 Geo. 6. c. xxii	25 May 1939
An Act to establish a superannuation fund for certain of the staff of the London and North Eastern Railway Company to provide that payments thereout shall not be assignable or chargeable to provide for winding up the affairs of Thompson McKay and Company Limited and for other purposes.
Willenhall Urban District Council Act 1939	2 & 3 Geo. 6. c. xxiii	25 May 1939
An Act to make further and better provision for the improvement health and local government of the urban district of Willenhall and for other purposes.
Gosport Corporation Act 1939	2 & 3 Geo. 6. c. xxiv	25 May 1939
An Act to confer powers upon the mayor aldermen and burgesses of the borough of Gosport relative to the acquisition and use of certain cliff lands and buildings and the pier and other premises at Lee-on-the-Solent in the said borough to extend the boundaries of the borough and to make further provision in regard to the undertakings of the said mayor aldermen and burgesses and the health local government and improvement of the borough and for other purposes.
Saint Nicholas Millbrook (Southampton) Church (Sale) Act 1939	2 & 3 Geo. 6. c. xxv	25 May 1939
An Act to provide for the pulling down of the Church of Saint Nicholas Millbrook in the county borough of Southampton for the sale of the same and the site and churchyard thereof and the use of such site and churchyard for building or otherwise and for other purposes.
Methodist Church Act 1939	2 & 3 Geo. 6. c. xxvi	25 May 1939
An Act to constitute and incorporate the trustees for Methodist Church Purposes and to vest in them the properties formerly vested in the trustees for Wesleyan Methodist Chapel Purposes (Registered) or in the trustees for United Methodist Church Purposes Registered and for other purposes.
King Edward the Seventh Welsh National Memorial Association Act 1939 (repealed)	2 & 3 Geo. 6. c. xxvii	25 May 1939
An Act to make further provision with regard to the superannuation fund of The King Edward the Seventh Welsh National Memorial Association and for other purposes. (Repealed by National Health Service (Superannuation) Regulations 1947 (SR&O 1947/1755))
London Midland and Scottish Railway Act 1939	2 & 3 Geo. 6. c. xxviii	25 May 1939
An Act to empower the London Midland and Scottish Railway Company to acquire lands and for other purposes.
Royal Wanstead School Act 1939	2 & 3 Geo. 6. c. xxix	25 May 1939
An Act to confer further powers on the presidents vice-presidents treasurer and governors of the Infant Orphan Asylum to change the name of the said Corporation and for other purposes.
Scottish Union and National Insurance Company Act 1939 (repealed)	2 & 3 Geo. 6. c. xxx	25 May 1939
An Act for conferring further powers on the Scottish Union and National Insurance Company and for effecting certain amendments of the Acts which regulate the Company and for other purposes. (Repealed by Scottish Union and National Insurance Company's Act 1956 (4 & 5 Eliz. 2. c. lxv) (Note: Incorrectly cited as "S. Union and Nat. Insurance Co.'s 1956 (c.xlv)" in the Chronological Table of Local Acts.))
Smethwick Oldbury Rowley Regis and Tipton Transport Act 1939 (repealed)	2 & 3 Geo. 6. c. xxxi	25 May 1939
An Act to confer powers upon the corporations of Smethwick Oldbury Rowley Regis and Tipton in regard to certain tramways in their respective boroughs and to empower the said corporations to provide and work public service vehicles to confirm an agreement between the said corporations and the Birmingham and Midland Motor Omnibus Company Limited and for other purposes. (Repealed by West Midlands County Council Act 1980 (c. xi))
Dundee Corporation Order Confirmation Act 1939 (repealed)	2 & 3 Geo. 6. c. xxxii	13 July 1939
An Act to confirm a Provisional Order under the Private Legislation Procedure (Scotland) Act, 1936, relating to Dundee Corporation. (Repealed by Dundee Corporation (Consolidated Powers) Order Confirmation Act 1957 (6 & 7 Eliz. 2. c. iv))
	Dundee Corporation Order 1939	
Dundee Harbour and Tay Ferries (Superannuation) Order Confirmation Act 1939 (repealed)	2 & 3 Geo. 6. c. xxxiii	13 July 1939
An Act to confirm a Provisional Order under the Private Legislation Procedure (Scotland) Act, 1936, relating to Dundee Harbour and Tay Ferries (Superannuation). (Repealed by Dundee Harbour Act 1975 (c. xvii))
	Dundee Harbour and Tay Ferries (Superannuation) Order 1939	
Ministry of Health Provisional Order Confirmation (Congleton) Act 1939	2 & 3 Geo. 6. c. xxxiv	13 July 1939
An Act to confirm a Provisional Order of the Minister of Health relating to the borough of Congleton.
	Congleton Order 1939	
Ministry of Health Provisional Order Confirmation (Margate) Act 1939 (repealed)	2 & 3 Geo. 6. c. xxxv	13 July 1939
An Act to confirm a Provisional Order of the Minister of Health relating to the borough of Margate. (Repealed by Kent Water Act 1955 (4 & 5 Eliz. 2. c. xi))
	Margate Order 1939	
Ministry of Health Provisional Order Confirmation (Matlock) Act 1939	2 & 3 Geo. 6. c. xxxvi	13 July 1939
An Act to confirm a Provisional Order of the Minister of Health relating to the urban district of Matlock.
	Matlock Order 1939	
Ministry of Health Provisional Order Confirmation (Hailsham Water) Act 1939	2 & 3 Geo. 6. c. xxxvii	13 July 1939
An Act to confirm a Provisional Order of the Minister of Health relating to the Hailsham Water Company.
	Hailsham Water Order 1939	
Ministry of Health Provisional Order Confirmation (Luton Water) Act 1939	2 & 3 Geo. 6. c. xxxviii	13 July 1939
An Act to confirm a Provisional Order of the Minister of Health relating to the Luton Water Company.
	Luton Water Order 1939	
Ministry of Health Provisional Order Confirmation (South Kent Water) Act 1939	2 & 3 Geo. 6. c. xxxix	13 July 1939
An Act to confirm a Provisional Order of the Minister of Health relating to the South Kent Water Company.
	South Kent Water Order 1939	
Ministry of Health Provisional Order Confirmation (York Water) Act 1939	2 & 3 Geo. 6. c. xl	13 July 1939
An Act to confirm a Provisional Order of the Minister of Health relating to the York Waterworks Company.
	York Water Order 1939	
Ministry of Health Provisional Order Confirmation (Newhaven and Seaford Water) Act 1939	2 & 3 Geo. 6. c. xli	13 July 1939
An Act to confirm a Provisional Order of the Minister of Health relating to the Newhaven and Seaford Water Company.
	Newhaven and Seaford Water Order 1939	
Ministry of Health Provisional Order Confirmation (Corsham Water) Act 1939	2 & 3 Geo. 6. c. xlii	13 July 1939
An Act to confirm a Provisional Order of the Minister of Health relating to the Corsham Waterworks Company Limited.
	Corsham Water Order 1939	
Ministry of Health Provisional Order Confirmation (Burnham and District Water) Act 1939	2 & 3 Geo. 6. c. xliii	13 July 1939
An Act to confirm a Provisional Order of the Minister of Health relating to the Burnham Dorney and Hitcham Waterworks Company Limited.
	Burnham and District Water Order 1939	
Ministry of Health Provisional Order Confirmation (Slough) Act 1939	2 & 3 Geo. 6. c. xliv	13 July 1939
An Act to confirm a Provisional Order of the Minister of Health relating to the borough of Slough.
	Slough Order 1939	
Ministry of Health Provisional Order Confirmation (Swaffham Water) Act 1939	2 & 3 Geo. 6. c. xlv	13 July 1939
An Act to confirm a Provisional Order of the Minister of Health relating to the Swaffham Waterworks Company Limited.
	Swaffham Water Order 1939	
Ministry of Health Provisional Order Confirmation (Heywood and Middleton Water Board) Act 1939	2 & 3 Geo. 6. c. xlvi	13 July 1939
An Act to confirm a Provisional Order of the Minister of Health relating to the Heywood and Middleton Water Board.
	Heywood and Middleton Water Order 1939	
Ministry of Health Provisional Order Confirmation (Oxford) Act 1939 (repealed)	2 & 3 Geo. 6. c. xlvii	13 July 1939
An Act to confirm a Provisional Order of the Minister of Health relating to the city of Oxford. (Repealed by Oxfordshire Act 1985 (c. xxxiv))
	Oxford Order 1939	
South Shields Corporation (Trolley Vehicles) Order Confirmation Act 1939 (repealed)	2 & 3 Geo. 6. c. xlviii	13 July 1939
An Act to confirm a Provisional Order made by the Minister of Transport under the South Shields Corporation Act, 1935, (Note: South Shields Corporation Act 1935 (25 & 26 Geo. 5. c. xcvi)) relating to South Shields Corporation Trolley Vehicles. (Repealed by Tyne and Wear Act 1980 (c. xliii))
	South Shields Corporation (Trolley Vehicles) Order 1939	
St. Helens Corporation (Trolley Vehicles) Order Confirmation Act 1939	2 & 3 Geo. 6. c. xlix	13 July 1939
An Act to confirm a Provisional Order made by the Minister of Transport under the St. Helens Corporation Act, 1921, (Note: St. Helens Corporation Act 1921 (11 & 12 Geo. 5. c. lxxiii)) relating to St. Helens Corporation Trolley Vehicles.
	St. Helens Corporation (Trolley Vehicles) Order 1939	
Southend-on-Sea Corporation (Trolley Vehicles) Order Confirmation Act 1939	2 & 3 Geo. 6. c. l	13 July 1939
An Act to confirm a Provisional Order made by the Minister of Transport under the Southend-on-Sea Corporation Act, 1926, (Note: Southend-on-Sea Corporation Act 1926 (16 & 17 Geo. 5. c. civ)) relating to Southend-on-Sea Corporation Trolley Vehicles.
	Southend-on-Sea Corporation (Trolley Vehicles) Order 1939	
Sea Fisheries (Tollesbury and West Mersea) Order Confirmation Act 1939	2 & 3 Geo. 6. c. li	13 July 1939
An Act to confirm a Provisional Order made by the Minister of Agriculture and Fisheries under the Sea Fisheries Act, 1868, (Note: Sea Fisheries Act 1868 (31 & 32 Vict. c. 45)) for the establishment and maintenance of a Several Oyster Fishery at Tollesbury and West Mersea, in the estuary of the River Blackwater, in the county of Essex.
	Tollesbury and Mersea (Blackwater) Fishery Order 1939	
North West Midlands Joint Electricity Authority Order Confirmation Act 1939	2 & 3 Geo. 6. c. lii	13 July 1939
An Act to confirm a Provisional Order made under section one of the Electricity (Supply) Act, 1922, (Note: Electricity (Supply) Act 1922 (12 & 13 Geo. 5. c. 46)) relating to the North West Midlands Joint Electricity Authority.
	North-West Midlands Joint Electricity Authority (Increase of Borrowing Powers) Order 1939	
Oswestry Corporation Act 1939	2 & 3 Geo. 6. c. liii	13 July 1939
An Act to empower the mayor aldermen and burgesses of the borough of Oswestry to execute street improvements and to acquire lands for that purpose and for purposes of their market undertaking to confer further powers upon the Corporation in regard to their water electricity and markets undertakings and the health local government and improvement of the borough and for other purposes.
Tynemouth Corporation Act 1939	2 & 3 Geo. 6. c. liv	13 July 1939
An Act to empower the Mayor Aldermen and Burgesses of the Borough of Tynemouth to acquire lands for the protection of their waterworks and to effect adjustments of the boundaries of their water limits; to confer further powers upon them and make further provision with respect to their Water and Electricity Undertakings; to make further provision for the local government and finance of the Borough; and for other purposes.
Bognor and District Gas and Electricity Act 1939	2 & 3 Geo. 6. c. lv	13 July 1939
An Act to provide for the transfer to the Bognor Gas and Electricity Company of the Undertaking of the City of Chichester Gas Company; to confer further powers upon the Bognor Gas and Electricity Company and to change the name of that Company; and for other purposes.
London County Council (Money) Act 1939 (repealed)	2 & 3 Geo. 6. c. lvi	13 July 1939
An Act to regulate the expenditure on capital account and lending of money by the London County Council during the financial period from the first day of April one thousand nine hundred and thirty-nine to the thirtieth day of September one thousand nine hundred and forty and for other purposes. (Repealed by London County Council (Loans) Act 1955 (4 & 5 Eliz. 2. c. xxvi))
Southern Railway Act 1939	2 & 3 Geo. 6. c. lvii	13 July 1939
An Act to empower the Southern Railway Company to construct works and to acquire lands; to extend the time for the completion of a railway and the compulsory purchase of certain lands; to confer further powers on the Company; and for other purposes.
Croydon Corporation Act 1939 (repealed)	2 & 3 Geo. 6. c. lviii	13 July 1939
An Act to enable the Mayor Aldermen and Burgesses of the Borough of Croydon to pay compensation for certain loss injury or damage resulting from a certain outbreak of typhoid fever in the said borough notwithstanding certain provisions of the Public Authorities Protection Act 1893 (Note: Public Authorities Protection Act 1893 (56 & 57 Vict. c. 61)) and the Fatal Accidents Act 1846; (Note: Fatal Accidents Act 1846 (9 & 10 Vict. c. 93)) and for other purposes. (Repealed by Croydon Corporation Act 1960 (8 & 9 Eliz. 2. c. xl))
Saint Peter's Chapel Stockport Act 1939	2 & 3 Geo. 6. c. lix	13 July 1939
An Act to make provision with respect to the perpetual right of patronage of the Chapel of Saint Peter at Stockport in the County and Diocese of Chester and the sole right of nominating or presenting a Minister or Curate thereto; and for other purposes.
Droitwich Canals (Abandonment) Act 1939	2 & 3 Geo. 6. c. lx	13 July 1939
An Act to provide for the abandonment of the Droitwich Canal and the Droitwich Junction Canal and the vesting thereof in the Droitwich Corporation; and for other purposes.
Merthyr Tydfil Corporation Act 1939 (repealed)	2 & 3 Geo. 6. c. lxi	13 July 1939
An Act to provide for the discontinuance and abandonment of the light railways authorised by the Merthyr Tydfil Light Railway Orders 1899 and 1914 and for the running of omnibuses by the Mayor Aldermen and Burgesses of the borough of Merthyr Tydfil on the routes of such light railways; and for other purposes. (Repealed by Mid Glamorgan County Council Act 1987 (c. vii))
South Staffordshire Waterworks Act 1939	2 & 3 Geo. 6. c. lxii	13 July 1939
An Act to authorise the South Staffordshire Waterworks Company to construct new works; to raise additional capital; and for other purposes.
Jarrow Corporation Act 1939 (repealed)	2 & 3 Geo. 6. c. lxiii	13 July 1939
An Act to enlarge the powers of the Mayor Aldermen and Burgesses of the Borough of Jarrow with respect to the acquisition development and disposal of lands; to make further and better provision for the economic development and improvement of the Borough; and for other purpose. (Repealed by Tyne and Wear Act 1980 (c. xliii))
Stalybridge Hyde Mossley and Dukinfield Transport and Electricity Board Act 1939	2 & 3 Geo. 6. c. lxiv	13 July 1939
An Act to authorise the Stalybridge Hyde Hyde Mossley and Dukinfield Transport and Electricity Board to acquire by agreement from the Urban Electric Supply Company Limited Electricity the undertaking authorised by the Glossop Corporation Electric Lighting Order 1899; to enter into agreements with the Central Electricity Board in regard to the terms and conditions applicable to the supply of electricity to the undertaking after its acquisition by the Board; to extend the area of supply of electricity of the Board; and for other purposes.
Tiverton Corporation Act 1939	2 & 3 Geo. 6. c. lxv	13 July 1939
An Act to empower the Mayor Aldermen and Burgesses of the Borough of Tiverton to construct waterworks; to confer further powers upon them with respect to their water undertaking; to make further and better provision with respect to the health local government improvement and finance of the borough; and for other purposes.
Sunderland Corporation Act 1939	2 & 3 Geo. 6. c. lxvi	13 July 1939
An Act to empower the Mayor Aldermen and Burgesses of the Borough of Sunderland to appropriate the open space known as the West Park to the purposes of a civic centre and to construct upon the West Park and lands adjacent thereto a town hall and municipal and other buildings and to acquire lands compulsorily for those purposes; to authorise the abolition of the Corporation's market at High Street-East and to appropriate the site thereof for other purposes; to make further provision with regard to the health and good government of the borough; and for other purposes.
Stroud District Water Board &c. Act 1939	2 & 3 Geo. 6. c. lxvii	13 July 1939
An Act to constitute a joint board comprising representatives of the Stroud Rural District Council the Stroud Urban District Council and the Nailsworth Urban District Council; to transfer to and vest in the said Board the undertaking of the Stroud Water Company and the water undertakings of the Stroud Urban District Council and the Stroud Rural District Council; to empower the said Board to construct waterworks to supply water and to acquire lands; to make further provision with regard to the health local government and finance of the rural district of Stroud; and for other purposes.
Milford Haven and Tenby Water Act 1939	2 & 3 Geo. 6. c. lxviii	13 July 1939
An Act to empower the Urban District Council of Milford Haven to enlarge their Prescelly Reservoir and to confer further powers upon the Council in regard to their water undertaking; to empower the Mayor Aldermen and Burgesses of the Borough of Tenby to construct works to enable them to take a supply of water from the Urban District Council of Milford Haven; to make further provisions with respect to the finances of the Urban District; and for other purposes.
Port Glasgow Burgh and Harbour Order Confirmation Act 1939	2 & 3 Geo. 6. c. lxix	28 July 1939
An Act to confirm a Provisional Order under the Private Legislation Procedure (Scotland) Act, 1936, relating to Port Glasgow Burgh and Harbour.
	Port Glasgow Burgh and Harbour Order 1939	
Stirling Burgh Order Confirmation Act 1939	2 & 3 Geo. 6. c. lxx	28 July 1939
An Act to confirm a Provisional Order under the Private Legislation Procedure (Scotland) Act, 1936, relating to Stirling Burgh.
	Stirling Burgh Order 1939	
Ministry of Health Provisional Order Confirmation (North Lindsey Water Board) Act 1939	2 & 3 Geo. 6. c. lxxi	28 July 1939
An Act to confirm a Provisional Order of the Minister of Health relating to the North Lindsey Water Board.
	North Lindsey Water Order 1939	
Ministry of Health Provisional Order Confirmation (Wembley) Act 1939 (repealed)	2 & 3 Geo. 6. c. lxxii	28 July 1939
An Act to confirm a Provisional Order of the Minister of Health relating to the borough of Wembley. (Repealed by Local Law (North West London Boroughs) Order 1965 (SI 1965/533))
	Wembley Order 1939	
Ministry of Health Provisional Order Confirmation (Bacup) Act 1939 (repealed)	2 & 3 Geo. 6. c. lxxiii	28 July 1939
An Act to confirm a Provisional Order of the Minister of Health relating to the borough of Bacup. (Repealed by County of Lancashire Act 1984 (c. xxi))
	Bacup Order 1939	
Ministry of Health Provisional Order Confirmation (Falmouth) Act 1939	2 & 3 Geo. 6. c. lxxiv	28 July 1939
An Act to confirm a Provisional Order of the Minister of Health relating to the borough of Falmouth.
	Falmouth Order 1939	
Ministry of Health Provisional Order Confirmation (Hemel Hempstead) Act 1939	2 & 3 Geo. 6. c. lxxv	28 July 1939
An Act to confirm a Provisional Order of the Minister of Health relating to the borough of Hemel Hempstead.
	Hemel Hempstead Order 1939	
Ministry of Health Provisional Order Confirmation (Eastern Valleys (Monmouthshire) Joint Sewerage District) Act 1939	2 & 3 Geo. 6. c. lxxvi	28 July 1939
An Act to confirm a Provisional Order of the Minister of Health relating to he Eastern Valleys (Monmouthshire) Joint Sewerage District.
	Eastern Valleys (Monmouthshire) Joint Sewerage Order 1939	
Newquay and District Water Act 1939	2 & 3 Geo. 6. c. lxxvii	28 July 1939
An Act to confirm the construction by the Newquay and District Water Company of certain works to confer further powers upon the Company and for other purposes.
Colne Valley Water Act 1939	2 & 3 Geo. 6. c. lxxviii	28 July 1939
An Act to authorise the Colne Valley Water Company to construct new works and to raise additional capital; to extend the limits of supply of the Company; to make better provision with respect to the repair and maintenance of communication pipes; and for other purpose.
West Surrey Water Act 1939	2 & 3 Geo. 6. c. lxxix	28 July 1939
An Act to authorise the West Surrey Water Company to construct additional waterworks; to enlarge the capital and borrowing powers of the Company; to make better provision with respect to the laying and maintenance of pipes for the supply of water within the limits of supply of the Company; to confer further powers upon the Company; and for other purposes.
Falmouth Docks Acts 1939 (repealed)	2 & 3 Geo. 6. c. lxxx	28 July 1939
An Act to authorise the Falmouth Docks and Docks Engineering Company to construct a new quay; to confer further powers upon the Company; and for other purposes. (Repealed by Falmouth Docks Act 1959 (7 & 8 Eliz. 2. c. xl))
Bristol Waterworks Act 1939	2 & 3 Geo. 6. c. lxxxi	28 July 1939
An Act to authorise the Bristol Waterworks Company to construct new works and to raise additional capital and for other purposes.
Walsall Corporation Act 1939	2 & 3 Geo. 6. c. lxxxii	28 July 1939
An Act to authorise the purchase of lands by the mayor aldermen and burgesses of the borough of Walsall to vest in them the common known as Delves Green and to make further provision with regard to their electricity gas and other undertakings and the health local government and improvement of the borough and for other purposes.
Southampton Harbour Act 1939	2 & 3 Geo. 6. c. lxxxiii	28 July 1939
An Act to confer further powers on the Southampton Harbour Board and for other purposes.
Medway Conservancy Act 1939 (repealed)	2 & 3 Geo. 6. c. lxxxiv	28 July 1939
An Act to alter the constitution of the Conservators of the River Medway; to make further provisions with respect to the dues to be taken by the Conservators; to confer further powers upon the Conservators; and for other purposes. (Repealed by Medway Conservancy Act 1963 (c. xxv))
Bootle Corporation Act 1939	2 & 3 Geo. 6. c. lxxxv	28 July 1939
An Act to extend the boundaries of the borough of Bootle; to confer further powers on the Mayor Aldermen and Burgesses of the said borough with regard to the health improvement good government and finance of the borough; to provide for the constitution of the Rimrose Brook Joint Sewerage Board; to authorise the purchase of the Church of Saint John in the borough by the Corporation and the application of the purchase money to the erection of a new church in substitution therefor; and for other purposes.
National Trust Act 1939	2 & 3 Geo. 6. c. lxxxvi	28 July 1939
An Act to make further provision with respect to the transfer of lands to the National Trust for Places of Historic Interest or Natural Beauty and for other purposes.
Macclesfield Corporation Act 1939	2 & 3 Geo. 6. c. lxxxvii	28 July 1939
An Act to enable the Mayor Aldermen and Burgesses of the Borough of Macclesfield to construct further waterworks; to reduce the amount of compensation water which they are required to discharge into the River Bollin; to confirm an agreement for the purchase of the undertakings of the Electricity Company of Macclesfield Limited; to make further provision with regard to streets buildings sewers and drains and the health and good government of the borough; and for other purposes.
Coventry Corporation Act 1939	2 & 3 Geo. 6. c. lxxxviii	28 July 1939
An Act to empower the Mayor Aldermen and Citizens of the city of Coventry to construct waterworks and street works; to confer further powers on the Corporation with regard to the health improvement and good government of the city; and for other purposes.
London Passenger Transport Act 1939	2 & 3 Geo. 6. c. lxxxix	28 July 1939
An Act to empower the London Passenger Transport Board to provide certain services of trolley vehicles; to construct new works; to acquire lands; and to raise additional moneys; to extend the time for the compulsory purchase of certain lands and the completion of certain works; to confer further powers on the Board including powers as to the running of public service vehicles; and for other purposes.
Aberdeen Harbour (Superannuation) Order Confirmation Act 1939 (repealed)	2 & 3 Geo. 6. c. xc	4 August 1939
An Act to confirm a Provisional Order under the Private Legislation Procedure (Scotland) Act, 1936, relating to Aberdeen Harbour (Superannuation). (Repealed by Aberdeen Harbour Order Confirmation Act 1960 (9 & 10 Eliz. 2. c. i))
	Aberdeen Harbour (Superannuation) Order 1939	
Dunbartonshire County Council (Kirkintilloch Street Improvement) Order Confirmation Act 1939	2 & 3 Geo. 6. c. xci	4 August 1939
An Act to confirm a Provisional Order under the Private Legislation Procedure (Scotland) Act, 1936, relating to Dunbartonshire County Council (Kirkintilloch Street Improvement).
	Dumbartonshire County Council (Kirkintilloch Street Improvement) Order 1939	
Lanarkshire County Council Order Confirmation Act 1939	2 & 3 Geo. 6. c. xcii	4 August 1939
An Act to confirm a Provisional Order under the Private Legislation Procedure (Scotland) Act, 1936, relating to Lanarkshire County Council.
	Lanarkshire County Council Order 1939	
Motherwell and Wishaw Electricity &c. Order Confirmation Act 1939	2 & 3 Geo. 6. c. xciii	4 August 1939
An Act to confirm a Provisional Order under the Private Legislation Procedure (Scotland) Act, 1936, relating to Motherwell and Wishaw Electricity Confirmation &c.
	Motherwell and Wishaw Electricity, &c. Order 1939	
Ministry of Health Provisional Order Confirmation (Bethesda) Act 1939	2 & 3 Geo. 6. c. xciv	4 August 1939
An Act to confirm a Provisional Order of the Ministry of Health relating to the urban district of Bethesda.
	Bethesda Order 1939	
Ministry of Health Provisional Order Confirmation (Bradford) Act 1939 (repealed)	2 & 3 Geo. 6. c. xcv	4 August 1939
An Act to confirm a Provisional Order of the Ministry of Health relating to the City of Bradford. (Repealed by West Yorkshire Act 1980 (c. xiv))
	Bradford Order 1939	
Metropolitan Water Board Act 1939	2 & 3 Geo. 6. c. xcvi	4 August 1939
An Act to empower the Metropolitan Water Board to execute works and to acquire lands; and for other purposes.
London Building Acts (Amendment) Act 1939	2 & 3 Geo. 6. c. xcvii	4 August 1939
An Act to amend the enactments relating to streets buildings and structures in London.
West Gloucestershire Water Act 1939	2 & 3 Geo. 6. c. xcviii	4 August 1939
An Act to authorise the West Gloucestershire Water Company to construct new waterworks; to raise further capital; and for other purposes.
London Gas Undertakings (Regulations) Act 1939 (repealed)	2 & 3 Geo. 6. c. xcix	4 August 1939
An Act to provide for the making of regulations with respect to the installation of supplies of gas and gas-fired appliances to and in premises in the county of London and matters incidental to such installation; and for other purposes. (Repealed by Gas Act 1986 (c. 44))
London County Council (General Powers) Act 1939	2 & 3 Geo. 6. c. c	4 August 1939
An Act to confer further powers upon the London County Council and other authorities; and for other purposes.
London County Council (Improvements) Act 1939	2 & 3 Geo. 6. c. ci	4 August 1939
An Act to empower the London County Council to execute street works and acquire lands in the City of Westminster; and for other purposes.
Folkestone Water Act 1939	2 & 3 Geo. 6. c. cii	4 August 1939
An Act to extend the limits of supply of the Folkestone Waterworks Company; to authorise the Company to construct new works and to acquire lands; to confirm the construction of certain existing works; to consolidate with amendments the provisions of the Folkestone Water Acts and Order 1848 to 1930 relating to the capital and borrowing powers of the Company; to authorise the Company to raise additional, money; to confer further powers upon the Company; and for other purposes.
Sheffield Corporation Act 1939	2 & 3 Geo. 6. c. ciii	4 August 1939
An Act to authorise the Lord Mayor Aldermen and Citizens of the City of Sheffield to construct street improvements and water works to provide accommodation for public service and other vehicles and to acquire lands for these and other purposes; to use compulsorily certain lands; to confer further powers upon the Corporation with regard to their waterworks undertaking; to make provision for the protection of the gathering grounds of their waterworks undertaking; to enact provisions with respect to the licensing and insurance of window cleaners; to amend the Rating and Valuation Act 1925; (Note: Rating and Valuation Act 1925 (15 & 16 Geo. 5. c. 90)) to make further provision with regard to the health improvement local government and finance of the City; and for other purposes.
Hamilton Burgh Order Confirmation Act 1939	2 & 3 Geo. 6. c. civ	21 September 1939
An Act to confirm a Provisional Order under the Private Legislation Procedure (Scotland) Act, 1936, relating to Hamilton Burgh.
	Hamilton Burgh Order 1939	
Baird Trust Order Confirmation Act 1939 (repealed)	2 & 3 Geo. 6. c. cv	31 October 1939
An Act to confirm a Provisional Order under the Private Legislation Procedure (Scotland) Act, 1936, relating to the Baird Trust. (Repealed by Baird Trust Reorganisation Act 2005 (asp 11))
	Baird Trust Order 1939	

== 3 & 4 Geo. 6 ==
The fifth session of the 37th Parliament of the United Kingdom, which met from 28 November 1939 until 20 November 1940.

This session was also traditionally cited as 3 & 4 G. 6.

=== Public general acts ===
Short title	Citation	Royal assent
Long title
Expiring Laws Continuance Act 1939 (repealed)	3 & 4 Geo. 6. c. 1	14 December 1939
An Act to continue certain expiring laws. (Repealed by Statute Law Revision Act 1950 (14 Geo. 6. c. 6))
Postponement of Enactments (Miscellaneous Provisions) Act 1939 (repealed)	3 & 4 Geo. 6. c. 2	14 December 1939
An Act to postpone the commencement of the House to House Collections Act, 1939, (Note: House to House Collections Act 1939 (2 & 3 Geo. 6. c. 44)) the Marriage (Scotland) Act, 1939, (Note: Marriage (Scotland) Act 1939 (2 & 3 Geo. 6. c. 34)) and certain provisions of the Adoption of Children (Regulation) Act, 1939, (Note: Adoption of Children (Regulation) Act 1939 (2 & 3 Geo. 6. c. 27)) to amend sections eight and fifteen of the last mentioned Act, and to amend the provisions of section one hundred and forty of the Law of Property Act, 1922, (Note: Law of Property Act 1922 (12 & 13 Geo. 5. c. 16)) with respect to the period within which applications may be made under that section. (Repealed by Statute Law Revision Act 1950 (14 Geo. 6. c. 6), Adoption Act 1950 (14 Geo. 6. c. 26) and Statute Law (Repeals) Act 1969 (c. 52))

== See also ==
- List of acts of the Parliament of the United Kingdom
