= Walter Lee =

Walter Lee may refer to:

- Sir Walter Lee (English politician) (1348 or 1353 – 1395)
- Sir Walter Lee (Australian politician) (1874–1963), Nationalist Party Premier of Tasmania
- Walter Lee (New Zealand politician) (1811–1887), New Zealand MP
- Walter Lee (trade unionist) (1904–1967), British trade union leader
- Dick Lee (Australian footballer) (Walter Henry Lee, 1889–1968), Australian rules footballer for the Collingwood Football Club

== See also ==
- Walter Lea (1874–1936), Canadian politician
- Walter Leigh (1905–1942), English composer
