= James W. Whitworth =

British trade union leader and politician

James William Whitworth (16 January 1898 – 10 April 1995) was a British trade union leader and politician.

Whitworth was educated at St Stephen's School in Audenshaw, and then the local college of technology. He became a cotton spinner, and in 1926 he was appointed as secretary of the Ashton-under-Lyne Operative Cotton Spinners' and Twiners' Association.

Whitworth was a supporter of the Labour Party, and in 1934 he was elected to the Ashton-under-Lyne council. In 1946, he became an alderman on the council, which he remained until it was abolished in 1974, and he served as Mayor of Ashton from 1947 to 1949. From 1939 to 1942, he also served on the National Executive Committee of the Labour Party.

The Ashton-under-Lyne Spinners were affiliated to the Amalgamated Association of Operative Cotton Spinners, and Whitworth was elected as its vice-president, then in 1953 as its president. In 1960, he instead became its full-time general secretary. During this period, he served on the Cotton Board, and was prominent on the council of the United Textile Factory Workers' Association, serving for a period as its treasurer. In 1965, Whitworth stood down as general secretary to become chair of the General Federation of Trade Unions, ending his term the following year.

Whitworth was made a Commander of the Order of the British Empire, a Deputy-Lieutenant of Lancashire, and a freeman of Ashton-under-Lyne.

Whitworth died in Ashton-under-Lyne on 10 April 1995, at the age of 97.

Trade union offices
Preceded by Edward Judson	General Secretary of the Ashton-under-Lyne Operative Cotton Spinners' and Twiners' Association; 1920–1960	Succeeded by A. Powell
Preceded by Albert Knowles	President of the Amalgamated Association of Operative Cotton Spinners; 1953–1960	Succeeded by Walter Lee
Preceded by Charles Schofield	General Secretary of the Amalgamated Association of Operative Cotton Spinners; 1960–1965	Succeeded by Walter Lee
Preceded by Leonard Jackson	Chair of the General Federation of Trade Unions; 1965–1966	Succeeded by Edwin D. Sleeman
