= Edward Judson (trade unionist) =

Edward Wagstaff Judson (29 August 1868 – 14 August 1926) was an English trade unionist.

Judson was born in Ashton-under-Lyne, Lancashire, England to William Cornelius Judson and Charlotte Judson. He was baptized in the Wesleyan Methodist Church. He began working half-time in a cotton mill when he was ten years old. He joined the Ashton and District Operative Spinners' Association, and was elected as its general secretary in 1904. In 1913, he was additionally elected as president of the Amalgamated Association of Operative Cotton Spinners.

Judson was considered an effective leader of the spinners, leading the union through numerous trade disputes, while trying to avoid strike action. He served on the Parliamentary Committee of the Trades Union Congress from 1916 to 1918, but then stood down in order that Henry Boothman could contest a seat on the committee.

In 1919, Judson was chosen by the Ministry of Reconstruction to visit the United States and report back on various matters of interest. He was a supporter of the Labour Party, and was elected to Ashton-under-Lyne Town Council, on which he was the only Labour representative.

Judson suffered from increasingly poor health during the 1920s. He resigned as president of the Spinners' Union in late June 1926, and died a month and a half later.

Trade union offices
Preceded by William Marsland	General Secretary of the Ashton and District Operative Spinners' Association; 1904 – 1926	Succeeded by James W. Whitworth
Preceded by W. E. Harvey and James E. Tattersall	Auditor of the Trades Union Congress; 1912; With: David Watts Morgan	Succeeded by James Brown and Edward Duxbury
Preceded by Thomas Ashton	President of the Amalgamated Association of Operative Cotton Spinners; 1913 – 1926	Succeeded by Fred Birchenough
