= Albert Knowles =

British trade union leader

Albert Knowles (1885 – July 1953) was a British trade union leader.

Born in Turton, near Bolton, Knowles began working in a cotton mill at the age of eleven, also joining a local union. In 1908, he moved to Oldham and transferred to the Oldham Operative Cotton Spinners' Association. He was elected as the Oldham Spinners' assistant secretary in 1917, then 1936, became its general secretary. Also that year, he was elected to the management committee of the General Federation of Trade Unions (GFTU). In 1940, he was additionally elected as secretary of the Amalgamated Association of Operative Cotton Spinners.

From 1943, Knowles served on the Cotton Board, and was also elected to the executive of the British Cotton Growing Association. From 1950 to 1952, he was the chairman of the GFTU.

In his spare time, Knowles was active in the Workers Educational Association, acting as vice-chair of its North West District. He was made an Officer of the Order of the British Empire.

Trade union offices
Preceded by Fred Birchenough	General Secretary of the Oldham Operative Cotton Spinners' Association; 1936 – 1953	Succeeded by Walter Lee
Preceded by William Wood	President of the Amalgamated Association of Operative Cotton Spinners; 1940 – 1953	Succeeded by James W. Whitworth
Preceded by Fred Worthington	Chair of the General Federation of Trade Unions; 1950 – 1952	Succeeded by Archie Robertson
