= Charles Schofield (trade unionist) =

British trade unionist

Charles Schofield (died 5 December 1968) was a British trade unionist.

Schofield was born in Bolton, and worked in the cotton spinning department of W. Mather and Co. He joined the Bolton and District Operative Cotton Spinners' Provincial Association, and in 1914 was appointed as a full-time clerk for the union, but he was soon called up, and served overseas during World War I.

Schofield left the forces in 1919, and was appointed as assistant secretary of the Bolton Spinners. This was affiliated to the Amalgamated Association of Operative Cotton Spinners, and in 1920 he was elected to the amalgamation's executive committee. In 1940, was elected as the Bolton Spinners' general secretary, and also to the legislative council of the United Textile Factory Workers' Association (UTFWA).

In 1943, Henry Boothman, secretary of the Spinners' Amalgamation, became ill, and Schofield took over his duties. When Boothman retired the following year, Schofield was elected as his replacement, and he also replaced Boothman as treasurer of the UTFWA. As secretary, Schofield took a leading role in discussions about reorganising the industry. He also encouraged research into diseases which affected mule spinners. He was active in the General Federation of Trade Unions, the Cotton Board, and numerous other committees.

Schofield retired in 1960, and died eight years later. In his spare time, he was a justice of the peace, and in 1951 he was made an Officer of the Order of the British Empire.

Trade union offices
Preceded by William Wood	General Secretary of the Bolton and District Operative Cotton Spinners' Provincial Association; 1940–1960	Succeeded by J. G. Whalley
Preceded by Henry Boothman	General Secretary of the Amalgamated Association of Operative Cotton Spinners; 1944–1960	Succeeded by James W. Whitworth
