= Robert C. Handley =

British politician and trade unionist

Robert Crompton Handley (1881 – 4 February 1940) was a British politician and trade unionist.

Born in Bolton, Handley began working in a cotton mill as a half-timer at the age of ten. He eventually became a spinner, and joined the Preston Operative Cotton Spinners' Association, being elected as its treasurer, and then as its secretary.

Handley was also active in the Labour Party, and was elected to Preston Borough Council in 1923. In 1934/5, he served as Mayor of Preston, the third Labour mayor of the town. In 1936, he was elected as vice-chairman of the Amalgamated Association of Operative Cotton Spinners, and in 1938 he was also elected to the General Council of the Trades Union Congress.

Handley was also active internationally, attending the conferences of the International Labour Organization, at which he was particularly well known for his campaign for a maximum forty-hour working week.

Trade union offices
Preceded by James Billington	General Secretary of the Preston Provincial Operative Cotton Spinners' Association; 1919–1940	Succeeded by Harry Mercer
Preceded by James Bell and William Wood	Cotton Group member of the General Council of the Trades Union Congress; 1938–1940; With: James Bell	Succeeded by James Bell and Alfred Roberts
