= Preston Provincial Operative Cotton Spinners' Association =

Former trade union of the United Kingdom

- Founded: 1814
- Dissolved: September 1969
- Headquarters: Spinners Institute, Church Street, Preston
- Location: England
- Members: 1,464 (1920)
- Affiliations: Amalgamated Association of Operative Cotton Spinners

The Preston Provincial Operative Cotton Spinners' Association was a trade union representing cotton spinners in the Preston area of Lancashire, in England.

== History ==
A union of cotton spinners existed in Preston by 1795, but the union claimed a continuous existence only from 1814. In 1842 it was a founder member of the Association of Cotton Spinners, Twiners and Self-Actor Minders of the United Kingdom.

By 1854, the union was wealthy enough to rent its own premises, the Spinners Institute, and in 1873 it purchased the building, by which time the union's name was the Preston Operative Cotton Spinners' Association. In 1870, it was a founder member of the new Amalgamated Association of Operative Cotton Spinners. In 1886 it became the Association of Operative Cotton Spinners of Preston and its Vicinity, at which time it had 760 members, a figure which remained steady for many years.

In 1905, the union became the Preston Provincial Operative Cotton Spinners' Association, with the small Gregson Lane Operative Spinners' Association and Kirkham Operative Spinners' Association both affiliating. In 1920, the Farrington Operative Spinners' Association also affiliated, and the union for the first time admitted piecers, taking overall membership to a peak of 1,464.

The Gregson Lane affiliate was closed in 1939, while the Farrington and Kirkham ones survived until 1959. The Brierfield Operative Cotton Spinners' Association was established in 1942 as a new affiliate, but overall membership continued to fall, dropping to 427 by 1951, 112 in 1964, and just 69 in 1969. That year, the province was dissolved, with the few remaining members being accepted into the Bolton and District Operative Cotton Spinners' Provincial Association.

== General Secretaries ==
1854: Thomas Banks
1889: James Billington
1919: Robert C. Handley
1940: Harry Mercer
