= John William Ogden =

British trade unionist

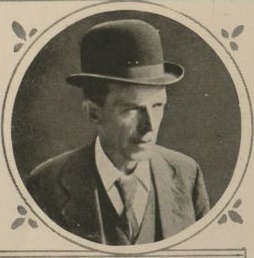
Ogden in 1920

John William Ogden (1862 – 23 March 1930) was a British trade unionist.

Ogden was born in Heywood, Greater Manchester, to Peter and Martha Ogden. He was baptised 14 September 1862. He began working half-time in a cotton mill at the age of eight and soon became active in his local trade union. In 1891, he was elected as secretary of the Heywood, Castleton, Norden and District Weavers' Association, and through this he served on the council of the Amalgamated Weavers' Association. He became president of the Amalgamated Weavers in 1910, and the following year was elected to the Parliamentary Committee of the Trades Union Congress (TUC). He served as President of the TUC in 1918, and as its delegate to the American Federation of Labour in 1920.

Ogden joined the Independent Labour Party in the 1890s, and through this became active in the Labour Party, standing unsuccessfully for Sowerby at the 1918 and 1922 general elections. He also served on Heywood Town Council and spent much of his spare time working with the Workers' Educational Association.

Ogden broke his leg around the end of 1929. The leg was amputated, but he died three months later from resulting complications.

Trade union offices
Preceded by J. Mills	General Secretary of the Heywood Weavers' Association; 1891 – 1930	Succeeded by John Cook
Preceded by David Shackleton	President of the Northern Counties Amalgamated Association of Weavers; 1910 – 1930	Succeeded by James Hindle
Preceded by John Hill	President of the Trades Union Congress; 1918	Succeeded by G. H. Stuart-Bunning
Preceded by Margaret Bondfield and Samuel Finney	Trades Union Congress representative to the American Federation of Labour; 1920; With: Jack Jones	Succeeded by J. H. Thomas and James Walker
Preceded by New position	Cotton Group member of the General Council of the Trades Union Congress; 1921 – 1930; With: Henry Boothman	Succeeded by Henry Boothman and James Hindle
