= Cotton Industry (Reorganisation) Act 1939 =

Act of the Parliament of the United Kingdom

Cotton Industry (Reorganisation) Act 1939 (Note: Section 41(1).)
- Act of Parliament
- Parliament of the United Kingdom
- Long title: An Act to make provision for the better organisation of the cotton industry and certain industries related thereto; and for purposes connected with the matter aforesaid.
- Citation: 2 & 3 Geo. 6. c. 54
- Territorial extent: United Kingdom

Dates
- Royal assent: 4 August 1939
- Commencement: On a date appointed by the Board of Trade (Note: Section 41(2), as substituted by section 1 of the Cotton Industry (Reorganisation) (Postponement) Act 1939 (2 & 3 Geo. 6. c. 116).)
- Repealed: 31 July 1947
Other legislation
| Amends | Cotton Spinning Industry Act 1936 |
| Amended by | Cotton Industry (Reorganisation) (Postponement) Act 1939 |
| Repealed by | Industrial Organisation and Development Act 1947 |

Status: Repealed

Text of statute as originally enacted

The Cotton Industry (Reorganisation) Act 1939 (2 & 3 Geo. 6. c. 54) was an act of the Parliament of the United Kingdom. It established the Cotton Board and was responsible for streamlining the industry by closing "surplus" factories.

== Subsequent developments ==
The whole act, and the postponement act, were repealed by section 16 of the Industrial Organisation and Development Act 1947 (10 & 11 Geo. 6. c. 40), which came into force on 31 July 1947.

== See also ==
- Cotton Spinning Industry Act 1936
- Cotton Industry Act 1959
