= Amalgamated Association of Operative Cotton Spinners =

Former trade union of the United Kingdom

Amalgamated Association of Operative Cotton Spinners and Twiners
- Founded: 1870
- Dissolved: 1970
- Headquarters: 115 Newton Street, Manchester
- Location: United Kingdom
- Members: 50,349 (1907)
- Key people: James Mawdsley (General Secretary)
- Affiliations: GFTU, TUC, UTFWA

The Amalgamated Association of Operative Cotton Spinners and Twiners, also known as the Amalgamation, was a trade union in the United Kingdom which existed between 1870 and 1970. It represented male mule spinners in the cotton industry.

== History ==
=== Background ===
The first attempts to form a trade union for cotton spinners occurred in the late 18th century, and there were numerous attempts to establish local and national unions throughout the 19th century. There had been the Manchester Spinners Union and the Grand General Union of Operative Spinners of the United Kingdom formed in 1828, by John Doherty. It only lasted two years. In 1845 several local associations in the North West and Yorkshire combined to form the Association of Operative Cotton Spinners, Twiners, and Self Acting Minders of the United Kingdom. This grew to 49 local affiliates, was able to appoint a full-time secretary, Thomas Brindle, and was central to the National Association of United Trades for the Protection of Industry. However, a downturn in the industry in 1849 led most of its affiliates to leave or dissolve entirely. It appears to have ceased to function after the Bolton union left in 1850, but maintained some nominal existence and revived from 1853 under Thomas Mawdsley. The association survived with around 4,000 members until, in 1870, it called a conference to found a new organisation, seeking to include local unions such as Oldham and Bolton which did not hold membership.

=== Growth ===
The Amalgamated Association of Operative Cotton Spinners, Self-Actor Minders, Twiners and Rovers of Lancashire and Adjoining Counties was formed in 1870. In 1878, James Mawdsley became the General Secretary of the Amalgamated Association of Operative Cotton Spinners. Shortly after his appointment he led the operatives in south east Lancashire in a strike against a 20% reduction in wages, securing 5% of this back in early 1880. In 1885 south east Lancashire employers sought a 10% reduction in wages. Again compromise was reached and a 5% reduction imposed.

The new union grew rapidly and by the late 1880s approximately 90 percent of cotton spinners were members. The union had 18,000 members at the turn of the century. By 1910 almost 100% of male mule spinners were members and its membership numbered 22000. The Amalgamation used the high level of union membership amongst mule spinners to restrict the supply of labour to employers, ensuring that their members were able to receive wages and working conditions significantly better than most British industrial employees. This elevated position within the industrial working class led to mule spinners being known as the Barefoot Aristocrats.

Less skilled workers in the cotton industry were generally not allowed to join the Amalgamation, instead forming their own unions. Female ring spinners were represented by the expansionist Amalgamated Association of Card and Blowing and Ring Room Operatives while the powerloom weavers were represented by the Amalgamated Weavers Association which had 114,000 members.

The Amalgamated Association of Operative Cotton Spinners had a federal structure with strong central leadership where control was in the hands of a small group of paid officials. While many of its affiliates were small unions, based in a single town, others were organised in five provinces, each of which covered a wide area and had numerous branches: the Blackburn Province of the Operative Cotton Spinners' Association, Bolton and District Operative Cotton Spinners' Provincial Association, Oldham Operative Cotton Spinners' Provincial Association, Preston Provincial Operative Cotton Spinners' Association, and Yorkshire Province of Operative Cotton Spinners. Union dues were high, so the fighting fund was large and the officials were skilled in defending the complex wage structures.

=== Decline ===
From the 1950s mule spinning was gradually replaced in the British cotton industry with ring spinning as improvements in technology allowed it to process finer grades of cotton. The size of the British textile industry also declined dramatically during this period due to a decline in demand and competition from foreign industry. This process was accelerated dramatically by the Cotton Industry Act 1959 which encouraged Lancashire cotton producers to rationalise by replacing or retiring older machines, primarily spinning mules.

This decline in available employment undermined the membership base of the Amalgamation and by December 1965 membership had fallen to 3,262. After considering amalgamation into the new Amalgamated Textile Workers' Union the decision was made to dissolve the union in 1970. The Amalgamation continued to function for several years, disbursing funds to former members and winding up the union's affairs, before it was finally deregistered in 1977.

== Office holders ==
All names from Alan Fowler and Terry Wyke, The Barefoot Aristocrats, p. 239

=== General Secretaries ===
1846: Thomas Brindle (Bolton)
1848: Thomas Mawdsley (Manchester)
1875: William Heginbotham (Hyde)
1878: James Mawdsley (Preston)
1902: William Howarth (Bolton)
1904: William Marsland (Ashton-under-Lyne)
1917: Henry Boothman (Oldham)
1944: Charles Schofield (Bolton)
1960: James W. Whitworth (Ashton-under-Lyne)
1965: Walter Lee (Oldham)
1967: Joseph Richardson (Bolton)

=== Presidents ===
1858: William Leigh (Hyde)
1876: William Radcliffe (Mossley)
1878: Thomas Ashton (Oldham)
1913: Edward Judson (Ashton-under-Lyne)
1926: Fred Birchenough (Oldham)
1936: William Wood (Bolton)
1940: Albert Knowles (Oldham)
1953: James W. Whitworth (Ashton-under-Lyne)
1960: Walter Lee (Oldham)
1966: Joseph Richardson (Bolton)
1967: Frederick Mayall (Oldham)

=== Treasurers ===
1849: William Fair (Manchester)
1876: William Leigh (Hyde)
1878: William Radcliffe (Mossley)
1883: Samuel Jones (Manchester)
1893: James Robinson (Bolton)
1896: Thomas Dawson (Oldham)
1932: Position abolished

== Bibliography ==
- Fowler, Alan; Wyke (1987). The Barefoot Aristocrats: A History of the Amalgamated Association of Operative Cotton Spinners. Littleborough: George Kelsall. ISBN 0-946571-10-4.

== External resources ==
- Amalgamated Association of Operative Cotton Spinners Archive at John Rylands Library, Manchester
