= Cotton Spinning Industry Act 1936 =

Act of the Parliament of the United Kingdom

Cotton Spinning Industry Act 1936 (Note: Section 23(1).)
- Act of Parliament
- Parliament of the United Kingdom
- Long title: An Act to provide for the elimination of redundant spinning machinery in cotton mills in Great Britain by means of a Board having power to acquire property and to borrow and levy money; for the making of certain payments to the said Board out of the Consolidated Fund or moneys provided by Parliament, and the making of certain payments by the said Board to the Exchequer; and for purposes connected with the matters aforesaid.
- Citation: 26 Geo. 5 & 1 Edw. 8. c. 21
- Territorial extent: England and Wales; Scotland; (Note: Section 23(2).)

Dates
- Royal assent: 29 May 1936
- Commencement: 29 May 1936 (Note: The Acts of Parliament (Commencement) Act 1793.)
- Repealed: 18 December 1953
Other legislation
Repealed by	Statute Law Revision Act 1953

Status: Repealed

Text of statute as originally enacted

The Cotton Spinning Industry Act 1936 (26 Geo. 5 & 1 Edw. 8. c. 21) was an act of the Parliament of the United Kingdom which introduced a compulsory levy on cotton machinery. The proceeds from this levy were used to scrap surplus spindles.

== Subsequent developments ==
The whole act was repealed by section 1 of, and the first schedule to, the Statute Law Revision Act 1953 (2 & 3 Eliz. 2. c. 5), which came into force on 18 December 1953.

== See also ==
- Cotton Industry (Reorganisation) Act 1939
- Cotton Industry Act 1959
