= William Wood (trade unionist, born 1873) =

British trade union leader

William Wood (18 February 1873 – 3 March 1956) was a British trade union leader.

Wood was born in Bolton, Lancashire. He left school at the age of 11, and began working half-time at a cotton mill. He joined the Bolton and District Operative Cotton Spinners' Provincial Association, and began working for the union in 1905. In 1914, he became its assistant secretary, then its secretary in 1920.

Wood became a magistrate in 1923, and was also involved with the Trustee Savings Bank, and sat on the executive of the United Textile Factory Workers Association.

In 1926, Wood was elected as vice-chairman of the Amalgamated Association of Operative Cotton Spinners, to which the Bolton Spinners were affiliated. In 1936, he became its president, and was also elected for two years to the General Council of the Trades Union Congress. However, in 1940, he was suffering with poor health, and decided to retire.

Trade union offices
Preceded by Peter Bullough	General Secretary of the Bolton and District Operative Cotton Spinners' Provincial Association; 1920–1940	Succeeded by Charles Schofield
Preceded by Fred Birchenough	President of the Amalgamated Association of Operative Cotton Spinners; 1936 – 1940	Succeeded by Albert Knowles
Preceded by Henry Boothman and James Hindle	Cotton Group member of the General Council of the Trades Union Congress; 1936 – 1938; With: James Hindle (1936 – 1937); James Bell (1937 – 1938)	Succeeded by James Bell and Robert C. Handley
