= Henry Boothman =

British trade union leader

Henry Boothman (5 February 1875 – 25 April 1953) was a British trade union leader.

Born in Clitheroe, Boothman moved with his family to Burnley when he was six years old, and he began working as a half-time in a local cotton mill when he was ten. He later became a minder at the mill, and relocated to Oldham when his parents died. In 1898, he began working full-time for the Oldham Operative Spinners' Association.

During World War I, Boothman served on the Cotton Control Board, and in 1916, he was elected as the General Secretary of the Amalgamated Association of Operative Cotton Spinners. Around the same time, he won election as treasurer of the United Textile Factory Workers' Association and, in 1919, he was elected to the Parliamentary Committee of the Trades Union Congress (TUC), and continued on its replacement, the General Council.

In 1922 Boothman was elected as a Labour Councillor in Oldham Council's St Pauls Ward for Labour, benefitting from a three way split in a Conservative, Liberal, Labor contest. He did not contest the seat again in 1924.

From 1925 to 1929, he served on the Board of Trade Committee.[3]  He also served as honorary treasurer of the United Textile Factory Workers' Association.[2]

Boothman served on the General Council of the TUC until 1936; during this time, he was asked to become chairman and President of the TUC, but he refused, on the grounds that this would require him to spend too much time away from the Lancashire base of his union. He served on the Cotton Board during World War II, but resigned from all his posts in 1943, after suffering from poor health. He died ten years later.

Trade union offices
Preceded by William Marsland	General Secretary of the Amalgamated Association of Operative Cotton Spinners; 1916 – 1943	Succeeded by Charles Schofield
Preceded by William Latham and Tom Shaw	Auditor of the Trades Union Congress; 1917; With: Frank Hodges	Succeeded by A. B. Hall and Charles Hobson
Preceded by New position	Cotton Group member of the General Council of the Trades Union Congress; 1921 – 1936; With: John William Ogden (1921 – 1929); James Hindle (1930 – 1936)	Succeeded by James Hindle and William Wood
