= Thomas Ashton (cotton spinner) =

British trade union leader and cotton spinner

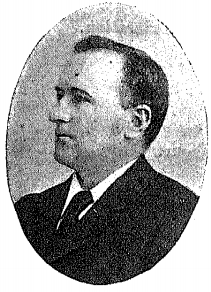
Ashton in 1901

Thomas Ashton (15 August 1841 – 15 September 1919) was a British trade union leader.

== Life ==
Ashton was born in Oldham, to William Ashton and his wife Sally Mellor, who were cotton workers. His mother became ill after his birth, and he was mainly brought up by an aunt. He did not attend school, and began working in a cotton mill at the age of eight. He undertook various jobs in the mill before replacing his father as a spinner. During this time, he attended evening classes in a wide variety of subjects, with a particular focus on statistics, and when he was 27, he left the cotton industry to set up a school.

In 1868, Ashton was invited to stand for the general secretaryship of the Oldham Operative Cotton Spinners' Association, beating five other candidates in an election. Under his leadership, the union soon won a half-day on Saturdays, a standard wage scale, and overall increases in wages.

Ashton was a founder member of the Amalgamated Association of Operative Cotton Spinners, and was elected as its president in 1878. He also served as treasurer of the United Textile Factory Workers' Association, and secretary of the Oldham Trades and Labour Council.

Ashton also took an interest in politics, and was twice selected as the Labour Party candidate for Oldham. However, he stood down before the 1906 UK general election after the Spinners Union resolved that he could not continue as president if he was elected to Parliament, and before the January 1910 UK general election due to concerns about his health.

Ashton resigned from his trade union posts in 1913, due to poor health. His wife died unexpectedly on 14 September 1919, and Ashton died the following day.

Trade union offices
Preceded by ?	General Secretary of the Oldham Operative Cotton Spinners' Association; 1868 – 1913	Succeeded by Fred Birchenough
Preceded by William Radcliffe	President of the Amalgamated Association of Operative Cotton Spinners; 1878 – 1913	Succeeded by Edward Judson
Preceded by James Millar Jack and Thomas Sharples	Auditor of the Trades Union Congress; 1884; With: John Wilson	Succeeded by Joseph Hope and George Davy Kelley
Preceded by J. T. Morrison and W. H. Lambton	Auditor of the Trades Union Congress; 1890–1894; With: R. Davidson (1890); R. Young (1891); Robert Johnstone (1892); W. C. Steadman (1893); Fred Hammill (1894)	Succeeded by William Parrott and William Henry Wilkinson
