= Oldham Operative Cotton Spinners' Provincial Association =

Former trade union of the United Kingdom

- Founded: 1843
- Dissolved: 1980
- Headquarters: 274 Rock Street, Oldham
- Location: England
- Members: 20,000 (1920)
- Affiliations: Amalgamated Association of Operative Cotton Spinners

The Oldham Operative Cotton Spinners' Provincial Association was a trade union representing cotton spinners across eastern Lancashire, in England. It was often the large spinners' union, and provided much of the leadership of the Spinners' Amalgamation.

== History ==
A union of spinners existed in Oldham by 1797, and may have been in continuous existence thereafter. In 1843, it was reconstituted under the name of the Oldham Provincial Cotton Spinners' and Self Actor Minders' Association, and established an office on Roch Street in the town. From the start, the union had branches in Lees, Shaw and Waterhead, in addition to Oldham, and it soon expanded to included branches in Chadderton, Hollinwood, Middleton and Royton. By 1868, it had 2,226 members.

The union was a member of the Association of Operative Cotton Spinners, Twiners and Self-Actor Minders of the United Kingdom from its formation in 1845, but left in 1853, and held membership intermittently thereafter. In 1870, it was a founder member of the new Amalgamated Association of Operative Cotton Spinners, but it retained control over the welfare benefits it paid members, and over wage negotiations. Initially its second-largest province, after Bolton, it grew steadily. By 1919, it provided 40% of the entire membership of the amalgamation, but when piecers were admitted, it again fell behind Bolton. In 1939, it still had 10,000 members, spread over 15 branches.

After World War II, membership of the union declined rapidly, and in 1973 it stood at only 12 people. Despite this, it survived until 1980, when it was dissolved.

== General Secretaries ==
1868: Thomas Ashton
1913: Fred Birchenough
1936: Albert Knowles
1953: Walter Lee
1967: Frederick Mayall
