= James Hindle =

British trade unionist (1871–1942)

James Hindle (13 April 1871 – 31 July 1942) was a British trade unionist.

Born in Heywood, Hindle became a weaver at an early age. In 1888, he moved with his family to Burnley and became involved in the Burnley Weavers' Association. Ten years later, he was appointed as the full-time Assistant Secretary of the association. In 1912, Fred Thomas, Secretary of the Burnley Weavers, lost a key vote relating to action during a lockout, and resigned, claiming that he was in poor health. Hindle, considered a more radical figure, took over the post.

Hindle became involved in the Labour Party, and from 1926 to 1928 served on its National Executive Committee. He also sat on a commission investigating the cotton industry in India. In 1930, he was elected as President of the Amalgamated Weavers' Association, of which the Burnley Weavers were a constituent, holding the post for seven years.

Hindle retired from his union posts in 1940, and died two years later.

Trade union offices
| Preceded by Fred Thomas | Secretary of the Burnley Weavers' Association; 1912 – 1940 | Succeeded by Robinson Graham |
| Preceded by John William Ogden | President of the Amalgamated Weavers' Association; 1930 – 1937 | Succeeded by James Bell |
| Preceded by John William Ogden and Henry Boothman | Cotton Group member of the General Council of the Trades Union Congress; 1930 – 1937; With: Henry Boothman (1930 – 1936); William Wood (1936 – 1937) | Succeeded by James Bell and William Wood |
