= Fred Birchenough =

British trade unionist

Frederick William Birchenough (12 November 1872 – 10 January 1951) was a British trade unionist.

Born in Macclesfield, Birchenough grew up in Chadderton. He joined the Oldham Operative Cotton Spinners' Association, becoming auditor of its Chadderton branch in 1903, and assistant secretary of the association in 1910. In 1913, he was elected as secretary of the Oldham Spinners. He was also elected to the executive of the Amalgamated Association of Operative Cotton Spinners, of which the Oldham Spinners held membership, and in 1926 additionally became president of this organisation.

The Spinners' Union was affiliated to the United Textile Factory Workers' Association, and Birchenough was elected to its legislative council in 1915. His rise to prominence continued in 1917, when he was elected to the management committee of the General Federation of Trade Unions (GFTU), and he served as chairman of the GFTU from 1924 to 1926.

Birchenough also served on the council of the British Cotton Growing Association and the Food Council, and in 1930/31 was part of the British Economic Mission to the Far East. He retired in 1936 and moved to Bispham, dying fifteen years later in Blackpool.

Trade union offices
Preceded by Thomas Ashton	General Secretary of the Oldham Operative Cotton Spinners' Association; 1913 – 1936	Succeeded by Albert Knowles
Preceded by Edward Judson	President of the Amalgamated Association of Operative Cotton Spinners; 1926 – 1936	Succeeded by William Wood
Preceded by Alfred Short	Chairman of the General Federation of Trade Unions; 1924 – 1926	Succeeded by Alex Hutchison
