= Cyril Harrison (businessman) =

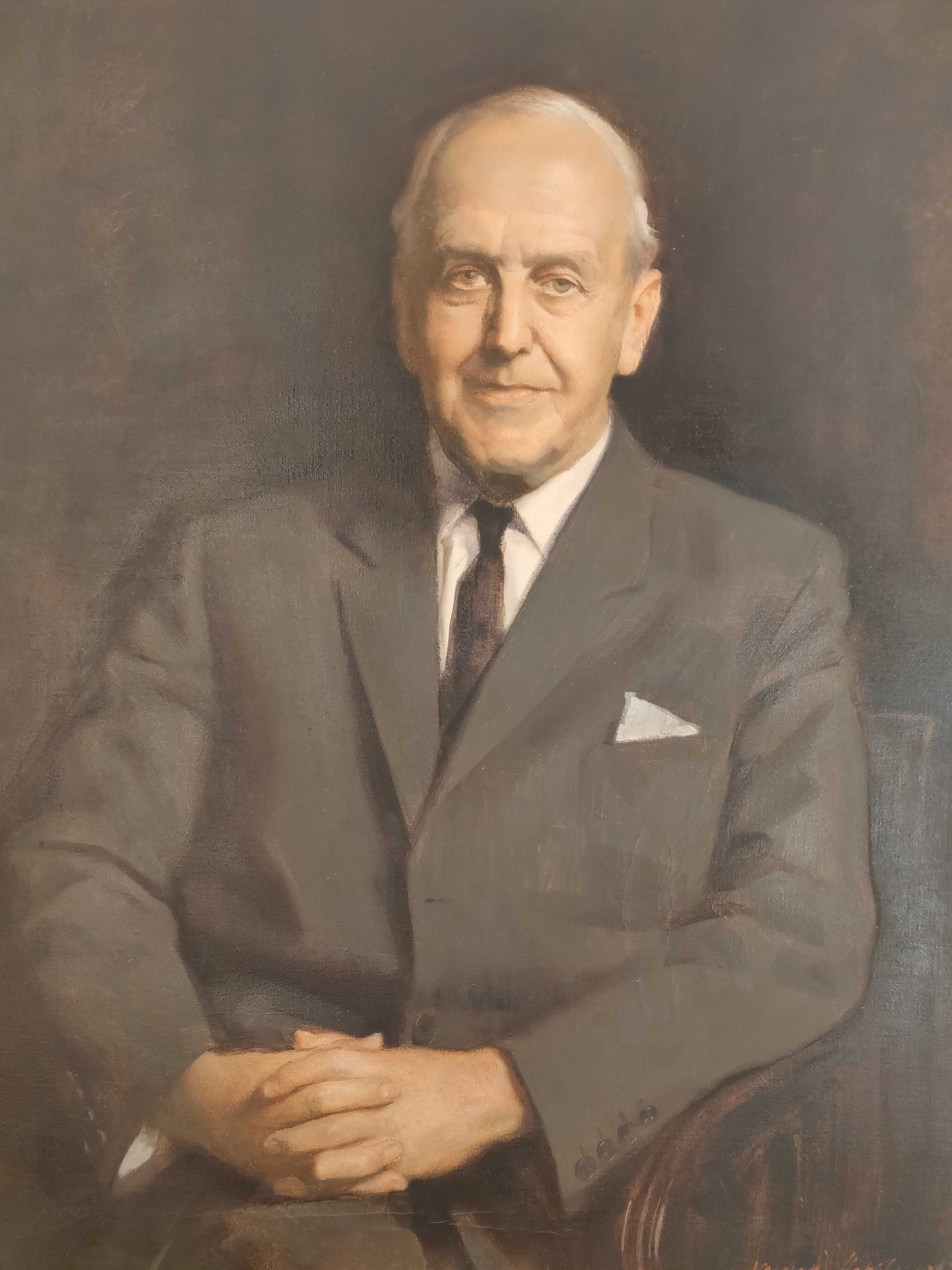
A portrait of Sir Cyril Harrison

Sir Cyril Ernest Harrison (14 December 1901, Sileby, Leicestershire – 15 March 1980, Wilmslow, Cheshire) was a cotton industrialist. He was President of the Federation of British Industry and Confederation of British Industry during the 1950s and 1960s following his work as Managing Director at English Calico.

== Career ==
At the age of 16 in 1917 he was an office boy at Perseverance Mill in Padiham, then trained as a weaver, and then became a fabric dealer on the Manchester Cotton Exchange. With a friend he then set up a fabric merchanting business, C E Harrison & Co, in 1928. He later qualified as a fellow of the Chartered Institute of Secretaries.

In 1939 he was appointed manager of the yarn sales division of the English Sewing Cotton Company (ESC), Britain's second largest producer of cotton thread. He became managing director in 1948, the business having prospered when wartime conditions restricted competition from overseas.

Competition returned in the 1950s from countries with lower labour costs and affected ESC's profits in spite of modernisation. In 1968, ESC merged with the Calico Printers' Association, a dominant textile firm, and adopted the name English Calico.

Harrison was President of the Manchester Chamber of Commerce from 1958 to 1959. From 1961 he was President of the Federation of British Industry (FBI) and in the same year was conferred an honorary master's degree by Manchester University. From 1961 to 1963 was on the grand council of the Confederation of British Industry (CBI). He was knighted for services to industry in 1963.

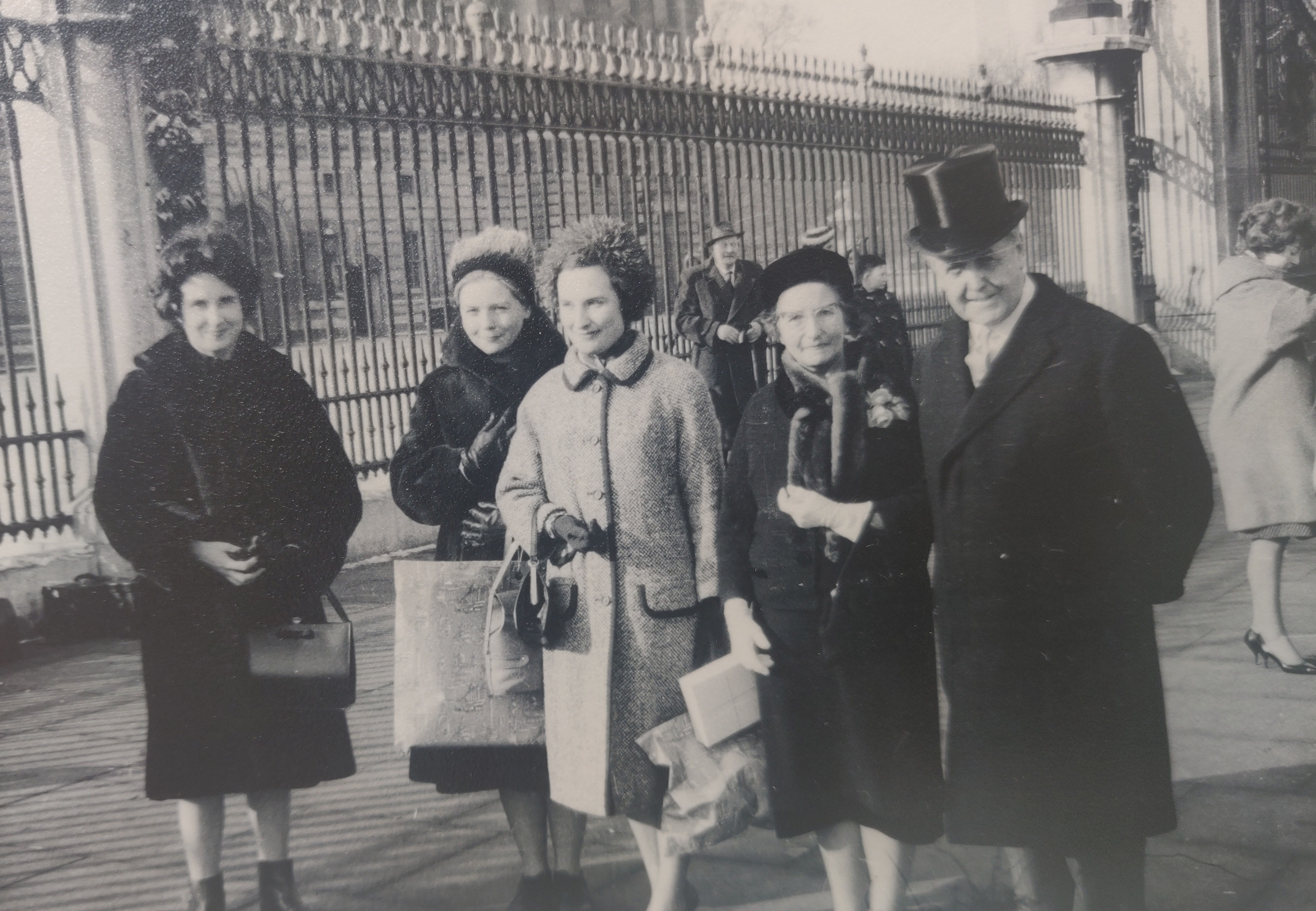
Sir Cyril with family outside of Buckingham Palace on the morning of his Knighthood in 1963

He was active in the Cotton Board, which represented Lancashire's interests.

He was a deacon and secretary of Wilmslow Congregational Church.

== Personal life ==
After his birth in Sileby his parents moved to Lancashire and he was educated at Padiham Wesleyan school and Burnley Grammar School. In 1927 he married Ethel (c. 1901 – 1971), daughter of Edward Wood, a Burnley accountant, and they had two sons, David Michael Harrison and Ian Wood Harrison.

== See also ==
- List of Mills in Padiham
- 1963 Birthday Honours
