= Cotton Industry Act 1959 =

Act of the Parliament of the United Kingdom

Cotton Industry Act 1959 (Note: Section 5(1).)
- Act of Parliament
- Parliament of the United Kingdom
- Long title: An Act to enable schemes made with a view to eliminating excess capacity in the cotton industry to provide for paying compensation for any such elimination and for raising the sums required for that and other purposes by levies on the industry; to enable the Board of Trade to make contributions towards any such compensation and to make grants for the re-equipment of the industry; and for purposes connected therewith.
- Citation: 7 & 8 Eliz. 2. c. 48
- Territorial extent: England and Wales; Scotland; (Note: Section 5(2).)

Dates
- Royal assent: 9 July 1959
- Commencement: 9 July 1959 (Note: The Acts of Parliament (Commencement) Act 1793.)
- Repealed: 16 June 1977
Other legislation
Repealed by	Statute Law (Repeals) Act 1977

Status: Repealed

Text of statute as originally enacted

The Cotton Industry Act 1959 (7 & 8 Eliz. 2. c. 48) was an act of the Parliament of the United Kingdom that aimed to reorganise the Lancashire cotton industry to prevent its further decline. It provided for grants to replace equipment. The reorganisation process was voluntary in large part to be managed by the Cotton Board.

It was the last major legislative intervention, following other attempts to help rationalise and modernise the industry including the Cotton Spinning Industry Act 1936 (26 Geo. 5 & 1 Edw. 8. c. 21) and the Cotton Industry (Reorganisation) Act 1939 (2 & 3 Geo. 6. c. 54).

Implementation of the act ran into considerable trouble as demand for cotton collapsed.

== Subsequent developments ==
The whole act was repealed by section 1(1) of, and part XIX of schedule 1 to, the Statute Law (Repeals) Act 1977, which came into force on 16 June 1977.
