= Bolton and District Operative Cotton Spinners' Provincial Association =

Former trade union of the United Kingdom

- Operative Cotton Spinners' Provincial Association of Bolton and District
- Founded: 1880
- Dissolved: 1973
- Headquarters: 77 St George's Road, Bolton
- Location: England
- Members: 18,501 (1927)
- Affiliations: Amalgamated Association of Operative Cotton Spinners

The Bolton and District Operative Cotton Spinners' Provincial Association (BOCSPA) was a trade union representing cotton spinners across central Lancashire, in England. It was the most important union of cotton spinners, and dominated the Spinners' Amalgamation.

== History ==
Bolton saw the earliest known unions of cotton spinners, one being in existence by 1810. A succession of societies grew and then collapsed, but there appears to have been a union in continuous existence from at least 1842, and in 1848 it was reformed as the United Operative Cotton Spinners and Self-Actor Minders' Association of Bolton and District. The Bolton Self-Actor Minders' Society split away in 1861, but the two unions merged in 1880, forming what in 1882 became known as the Operative Cotton Spinners' Provincial Association of Bolton and District.

The union was not restricted to Bolton, but included branches in Atherton, Farnworth, Leigh, Manchester and Reddish. As the hand mule spinning trade declined, machine spinning grew, and with it, so did the union, admitting branches in Chorley and Tyldesley in 1883, Hindley and Pendlebury in 1885, and several more in Manchester. The union proved successful in co-ordinating wage bargaining, with all the unions having similar, locally determined, wage lists, payment being based on the type of yarn used. In 1918, the union also admitted a branch in Wigan, and with the Manchester branches consolidated, this meant it had a total of eleven branches.

The union was affiliated to the Amalgamated Association of Operative Cotton Spinners, but it retained control over the welfare benefits it paid members, and over wage negotiations. The Amalgamation led on trade disputes and strike benefits payments, but the Bolton District was allocated an automatic majority of seats on its executive.

For many years, the union also represented cotton piecers, although they were not entitled to a vote in union business. In 1914, they split away to form the United Piecers' Association, significantly reducing the union's membership to below that of the Oldham Spinners. However, the breakaway was not a success, dissolving by 1919, and the piecers soon rejoined. Membership reached a peak of 18,501 in 1927, but the Great Depression saw up to 30% of union members unemployed, emptying the union's substantial reserves.

The outlying districts of Wigan and Hindley were dissolved in 1941, and the decline in the Lancashire cotton industry began to hit the union. By 1947, membership was 6,200, and by 1959 it was only 2,250. In response, in 1960, the Atherton, Manchester and Reddish districts were dissolved, followed in 1961 by Chorley, Farnworth and Pendlebury, and in 1962 by Tyldesley. Leigh was dissolved in 1964, leaving only the central Bolton district, and its membership fell rapidly, from 516 in 1964, to 187 in 1970, and just 23 in 1972. In October 1973, the union held its final meeting, which agreed to dissolve the organisation, with the final few members transferring to the Rochdale Spinners. It was deregistered as a union in 1975.

== General Secretaries ==
1880: John Fielding
1894:
1896: Alfred Gill
1914: Peter Bullough
1919: William Wood
1940: Charles Schofield
1960: J. G. Whalley
1960s: Joseph Richardson

== External Resources ==
- Bolton and District Operative Cotton Spinners Archive at John Rylands Library, Manchester
