= Walter Lee (trade unionist) =

British trade union leader

Walter N. Lee
- Born: 1904
- Died: 16 February 1967 (aged 62–63)
- Occupation: Trade union leader
- Known for: General Secretary of the Oldham Operative Cotton Spinners’ Association (1953–1960); President and General Secretary of the Amalgamated Association of Operative Cotton Spinners (1960–1967)

Walter N. Lee (1904 – 16 February 1967) was a British trade union leader.

Lee began working in a cotton spinning room at the age of twelve. He joined the Oldham Operative Cotton Spinners' Association, eventually becoming its assistant secretary, then, in 1953, its general secretary.

The Oldham Spinners were affiliated with the Amalgamated Association of Operative Cotton Spinners, and in 1960 Lee was additionally elected as its president. This was followed, in 1965, by his election as general secretary of the Spinners' Union.

Lee was also active in the Labour Party, and from 1959 served as an elected auditor of the party's accounts. He also served on the Textile Council, as a magistrate, and on the Oldham Health Executive Committee.

Trade union offices
Preceded by Albert Knowles	General Secretary of the Oldham Operative Cotton Spinners' Association; 1953–1967	Succeeded by Frederick Mayall
Preceded by James W. Whitworth	President of the Amalgamated Association of Operative Cotton Spinners; 1960–1965	Succeeded by Joseph Richardson
Preceded by James W. Whitworth	General Secretary of the Amalgamated Association of Operative Cotton Spinners; 1965–1967	Succeeded by Joseph Richardson
