= Industrial Organisation and Development Act 1947 =

Act of the Parliament of the United Kingdom

Industrial Organisation and Development Act 1947 (Note: Section 17(1).)
- Act of Parliament
- Parliament of the United Kingdom
- Long title: An Act to provide for the establishment of development councils to exercise functions for improving or developing the service rendered to the community by industries and for other purposes in relation thereto, for making funds available for certain purposes in relation to industries for which there is no development council, for the disposal of any surplus of funds levied under emergency provision for encouragement of exports, for the making of grants to bodies established for the improvement of design, and for purposes connected therewith and consequential thereon.
- Citation: 10 & 11 Geo. 6. c. 40
- Territorial extent: England and Wales; Scotland; (Note: Section 15.)

Dates
- Royal assent: 31 July 1947
- Commencement: 31 July 1947 (Note: The Acts of Parliament (Commencement) Act 1793.)

Other legislation
- Repeals/revokes: Cotton Industry (Reorganisation) Act 1939; Cotton Industry (Reorganisation) (Postponement) Act 1939
- Amended by: Statute Law Revision Act 1950; Statute Law (Repeals) Act 1978; Agriculture Act 1993

Status: Amended

Text of statute as originally enacted

Revised text of statute as amended

Text of the Industrial Organisation and Development Act 1947 as in force today (including any amendments) within the United Kingdom, from legislation.gov.uk.

The Industrial Organisation and Development Act 1947 (10 & 11 Geo. 6. c. 40) is an act of the Parliament of the United Kingdom that enabled the creation of industrial development boards with powers to raise levies from specific industrial sectors in the United Kingdom for co-ordinated action, particularly in research, marketing and industrial re-organisation. These boards were to report to the Board of Trade and have equal representation from trades unions and employers alongside independent experts.

== Origins of the act ==
During the Second World War the Board of Trade made plans for post-war industry boards that would report to an Industrial Commission, each with significant powers. The boards would be "responsible for a range of closely inter-related projects ... all concerned with various aspects of industrial efficiency in the widest sense – re-equipment, re-organisation, development of new ideas ..." and granted powers of compulsory purchase as a last resort.

In the event, the act made the relations of the industrial concerns to the boards largely voluntary, excepting powers to oblige them to register with the boards and pay levies to pay for the boards' activities. Historian Corelli Barnett quotes Harold Wilson, then President of the Board of Trade, as saying: "[they] largely depended for the success of their efforts on securing the agreement and co-operation of the individual undertakings in an industry". Barnett concludes that:

Given that the British industrial system was deeply, doggedly resistant to reform, and no parts more so than those most hidebound and therefore in need of reform, such agreement and co-operation proved hard to find.

== Initial controversy ==
Slow progress in setting up the development councils caused frustration among trades unions, and particularly the Trades Union Congress, who warned in that the establishment of development councils could not be delayed much longer "without harming the immediate future and long-term prospects of industry" The TUC, in the face of the need to increase domestic exports and production, believed that:

War-time experience showed that it was well worth while to appoint a special committee—a joint production committee—to concentrate on production problems. The form which regular consultation should take must vary from industry to industry; what is wanted is the initiative to agree upon the machinery and the will to make it work

Employers, however, were suspicious of the proposed new arrangements:

Employers' objections to development councils are attributed partly to a dislike of outsiders—or even union officials—having a say in the management of their industry, but perhaps more to anxiety lest the development council should prove, in spite of all assurances, to be a half-way house to nationalization

== Early industrial development boards and associations created under the act ==
Only four boards were created in first wave. These included bodies for the cotton industry, furniture and jewellery and silverware. The Wool Textile Research Council was established in 1950 which funded the Wool Industries Research Association.

An order was made to create the Lace Research Association in 1948 and help for export promotion a little later with both activities funded by levies.

However, suggestions for other development boards proved controversial, particularly among employers, while trades unions were more enthusiastic, pushing for a development board to be set up for the pottery industry, for example.

Despite pressure from Labour backbenchers and the Trades Union Congress (TUC), plans for a Hosiery Development Board came to nothing. Wilson explained: "The employers in this industry are opposed to the establishment of a statutory Development Council. My aim has been to proceed in this matter as far as possible by agreement and I have not given up hope of doing so." But a Hosiery Board was not established.

Dissatisfaction with slow progress included an adjournment debate in 1948, where Labour backbencher Mr. A. Edward Davies MP stated that:

In respect of furniture, pottery, mining, china clay, hosiery and cotton we were given an indication that the government took the view that there might be set up with some useful results, development councils which would have some limited statutory power, and we had hoped that by this time greater progress could have been reported on what had been done in industry along those lines. The position today is that unfortunately, apart from the cotton industry, little seems to have been achieved. In fact, we have had great and responsible organisations like the TUC criticising the Government for the delay in implementing the act and bringing in development councils.

Davies went on to explain that employers seemed to fear nationalisation or interference, and the equal representation from unions on the councils, adding that resisting modernisation was unreasonable. He particularly lamented the lack of progress in the pottery industry which he had been championing. For Davies and the TUC, therefore, development councils were expected to be a key part of industrial planning and modernisation.

From a Conservative point of view, the act was a failure because of mistrust of the intentions of the administration. Aubrey Jones MP said in 1952:

in 1945, the then Labour government had a double industrial programme; for certain industries, nationalisation; for others, development councils. In the light of history I think it will be judged that the Industrial Organisation Act, 1947, has failed, not because of any defect in the conception but because people feared that the development council was the thin end of the wedge of nationalisation.

== The act under Conservative administration ==
Under Churchill's new Conservative government, elected in 1951, two of the development boards were quickly abolished. These were the Clothing Industry Development Council, abolished in 1952, and the Jewellery and Silverware Council in 1953. Both boards had run into disagreements between their members about how to proceed.

== The Cotton Board ==
The Cotton Board, unlike other boards, had received support from its industry. It was used to help reorganise the industry in the late 1950s. Large scale government investment particularly to replace old equipment was facilitated by the Board, but a combination of a credit squeeze, cheaper imports led to a crisis of confidence. The re-organisation was not wholly successful.

The Cotton Board was abolished in 1972, after completing a major report into the future of the industry. Many of its recommendations, particularly the use of tariffs to limit imports rather than quotas, had been accepted.

== New uses of the act in the 1960s ==
The cutlery industry requested a specific research levy in 1960 and were granted it in 1962. Horticulturers requested support along these lines as well, as a replacement for the Horticultural Marketing Council.

Levies to support other industry projects, mainly in research, found more support under the Wilson government of the 1960s. An Apple and Pear Development Council was created in 1966. In 1967, iron casting research funding was obtained through the act followed by support for hosiery research in 1969. Unlike the first wave of Industrial Boards, the responsibilities of these bodies were generally more limited and industry support clearer.

== Later uses of the act ==
=== Agricultural research and marketing ===
Further industry requests for levy schemes to support agriculture came during the Conservative governments of the 1980s and 1990s, for instance from the National Farmers Union for a horticultural development council, which was established in 1986. A Potato Industry Development Council (1997), Scottish Seed Potato Development Council (1981–1997) and Milk Development Council (1994) were all established under the act.

The Horticultural Development Council, the Milk Development Council, and British Potato Council were funded under the act until 2008, when they were merged with the Home-Grown Cereals Authority and Meat and Livestock Commission. They operate as separate bodies, levy-funded by their industries, but are administered under the Natural Environment and Rural Communities Act 2006 as a single body: the Agriculture and Horticulture Development Board.

=== Wool and textiles ===
Other than agriculture, levies were still being raised on the wool textile industries to promote exports in the first decade of the 21st century. They were paid to the National Wool Textile Export Corporation. However, in 2007, a consultation was run to remove this levy and a Statutory Instrument to revoke it was passed in 2008.

== Impact ==
The act was not used extensively to reorganise British industry as originally envisaged. The act proved controversial at first, as it was seen as an attempt to increase government control of industry, union influence and perhaps pave the way for nationalisation. Only four development boards were created under the 1945–51 Labour government. Of the major industries, only cotton saw a powerful board created from the act that went on to play a strategic role in helping change its industry.

On the other hand, the act provided a useful mechanism to find funding for marketing and research. Establishments such as Wool Industries Research Institute, or the Shirley Institute for the cotton industry, had an international reputation in their fields, and very talented scientists developed their careers there. However, similar research institutes developed in other industries through a combination of direct funding and voluntary arrangements, such as the British Rubber Producers Research Association or British Rayon Research Association.

Later, limited schemes to raise levies under the act for research or marketing gained the support of specific industries, particularly in the agricultural sector. The use of levies to support this work continues, although no statutory organisation uses the powers of the act today.
