= Cotton Board (United Kingdom) =

The Cotton Board was an organisation to oversee the organisation, research, marketing and promoting the cotton textile industry mainly based in Lancashire and Glasgow. It existed from 1940, and as a statutory Industrial Development Board from 1948 to 1972, known in its last years as the Textile Council.

== Funding, aims and purpose ==
Prior to the war, the main organisation representing the cotton industry was the Joint Committee of Cotton Trade Organisations, established in 1925. A voluntary Cotton Board was set up in 1940 to “promote the welfare of the industry by internal reorganisation, by the development of export trade, scientific research, propaganda and other means.” Sir Stafford Cripps praised the work of the voluntary Cotton Board in a speech at the Midland Hotel, Manchester on 4 December 1946.

The board was given statutory status in 1948 under the Industrial Organisation and Development Act 1947. The Board had equal representation from industry and trades unions, with four members each, plus three independent members. It was given the power to levy up to £250,000 a year from the industry.

Although it was intended to be essentially focused on changing the industry through its own efforts, David Clayton says: “From the mid-1950s ... the Cotton Board also became a lobby organization demanding changes to industrial and commercial policies.”

Its headquarters was in Manchester, together with the “Colour, Design and Style Centre”, which became the public face of the board.

== Research and development ==
The Board funded research into cotton fabrics via an industry-wide levy. This was undertaken by the British Cotton Industry Research Association, better known as the Shirley Institute. By the 1960s, research also covered man-made fabrics, whose manufacturers began to pay a research levy to the Board from 1961, and the Shirley Institute was merged with the British Rayon Research Association.

== Industrial reorganisation and replacement of machinery ==
The Board also engaged in a major attempt to reorganise the cotton industry, initiated by the Cotton Industry Act 1959. Nicholas Ridley, recounting the Board's history during the 1971 debate preceding its dissolution, said that in 1959, the Board engaged in co-ordination of a

major reorganisation of the industry, entailing the scrapping of machinery and compensation for redundant workers in the industry, [which] was carried through with great success and great expedition.

However, a combination of reduced consumer demand, poor marketing and cheaper Commonwealth imports during the period of reorganisation created, a “complete lack of confidence in the industry” according to the Board's chairman Lord Rochdale. This both reduced the amount asked for by industry and invested by the government and resulted in machinery being installed in mills that either closed or became idle. Furthermore, because of the need to replace machinery on a ten-year cycle, idleness was likely to mean that investments would not be recouped.

Ridley concluded:

A sum of £38.9 million was spent on the reorganisation of the cotton industry, of which the Government of the time contributed £24.7 million. It did not, I fear, come up to the full expectation and did not go as far as the council had hoped in reorganising the industry. But I feel that undoubtedly the verdict of history will be that this was a successful operation in adaptation, for which the council should be given full credit.

== Productivity enquiry and import tariffs ==
Between 1967 and 1969, the Textile Council conducted an enquiry into the productivity of the industry, and produced a major report.

The report recommended a move away from cotton import quotas to imposition of tariffs on cotton goods imported from the British Commonwealth and elsewhere to protect British industries. The recommendation was accepted by Wilson's Labour government and its Conservative successor.

Anthony Crosland, speaking for the government in the 1969 debate, claimed that:

There is no reason to think that, with the possible exception of India, the developing countries of the Commonwealth generally will be able to export less to Britain over a tariff of this amount than they would under a continuation of the quota system. So far as India is concerned, the Government will, when the time comes to determine the level of aid to India after 1972, take into account, against the background of India's general aid requirements at that time, any adverse effects on her exports arising from the tariff.

The rates suggested by the report were accepted by the government, and came into effect in 1972. They were:

6½ per cent. on yarn, 15 per cent. on cotton cloth, which accounts for the greater part of the trade, and 17 per cent. on most garments

Other important recommendations concerned investment, multi-shift working and better links between production and marketing. The recommendation to finance 40% investment grants was rejected as the government felt it would “not be justified in singling out this industry for financial assistance on such a scale”. The government also decided to encourage further mergers among smaller firms.

The policies were carried forward by the next Conservative government. Ridley said, during the dissolution debate that:

All who have read the report which it produced will agree that it was a most comprehensive, penetrating and full document, which earned the commendation of all concerned with the cotton textile industry.

== Promotional work ==
Between 1956 and c. 1962, the Cotton Board organised promotions to try and increase sales of Lancashire cotton within the UK, using generic marks, particularly the slogan ‘Buy British Cottons’.

it was responsible for initiatives which included work on new methods for utilising labour, design innovations, recruitment and training, and the encouragement of collaboration within the cotton industry. British fashion designs and fabrics were showcased at national and international exhibitions, ranging from an exhibition on the history of the cotton mills and a display of 1960s children's clothing to soft furnishing promotions at large stores and national fashion shows.

== Dissolution of the statutory Textile Council and formation of the voluntary British Textile Council ==
The Cotton Board was renamed the Textile Council in 1967. It was dissolved in 1971–2, at its own request, as it was felt the work would be better handled by a new voluntary British Textile Council.

== Key personnel ==
=== Chairs ===
1940: Raymond Streat
1957: Lord Rochdale
1963: Frank Rostron
1969: James Steel

=== Other members ===
- Sir Cyril Ernest Harrison chairman of English Sewing Cotton. Led a trade mission to Australia and New Zealand in 1959
- C. M. Miles, compiler and drafter of the 1969 report
- T. D. F. Powell Director General
- Sir Alfred Roberts, member from 1948 until 1963
- Lewis Wright was a leading representative, and later became President of the Trades Union Congress.
