= Alice Foley =

British trade unionist

Alice Foley (28 November 1891 – 1 July 1974) was a British trade unionist, known as the first woman to work full-time as the leader of a trade union in the cotton industry.

Born in Bolton in Lancashire, Foley attended her local Roman Catholic school. Her mother was illiterate, but her Irish father enthused her about literature, particularly Shakespeare, and the cause of Irish Home Rule. While she excelled in education, the local Catholic schools were not eligible for any scholarships, so Foley had to leave to work at a local cotton mill at the age of thirteen.

Alice's older sister, Cissy, preceded her into the mill, and her involvement in the Bolton and District Weavers', Winders' and Warpers' Association, the local Labour Church and the suffragette movement all inspired Alice. When her father died, Alice joined the local socialist club, and became active in the trade union herself.

Foley worked her way to becoming a winder at the mill. When the National Insurance programme was set up, in 1912, the Bolton Weavers employed her as a full-time health visitor. During World War I, she studied shorthand and gained some part-time experience of weaving, hoping to further her position in the union. In 1917, the union's assistant secretary resigned, but initially it decided to leave the post vacant, with Foley appointed as a "temporary clerk", effectively filling the role. The following year, it set an examination to determine who would win the post, contested by three women and five men. One candidate received a mark of 72%, with the next highest on only 38%. The union refused to announce who had obtained the highest mark and stated that it would not appoint to the position; it was widely believed that Foley was the highest-ranked candidate. Instead, she was given a position of union woman officer, effectively continuing as assistant secretary. In this role, she asked to be permitted to represent the union at meetings and conferences, but permission was refused, the union leadership preferring to be unrepresented than represented by a woman. In later years, Foley stated that "they were afraid to call me the assistant secretary because a woman trade union officer was a very rare bird in those days". The position was readvertised in 1919, and on this occasion, only men were permitted to apply.

Foley remained woman officer of the union, and in 1930 also became a local magistrate. In 1934, she obtained a one-year scholarship to study literature with the Workers' Educational Association (WEA), and subsequently became president of the Bolton WEA. She became active in the Labour Party, and was placed on the United Textile Factory Workers' Association's panel of Parliamentary candidates in 1935, but was ultimately not selected as a candidate for any constituency. In 1940, she was part of the negotiating team which won the right to paid holiday for textile workers in Lancashire, while in 1948, she travelled to Germany and Austria with Ness Edwards to assess whether some of the displaced persons were suitable for work in the cotton industry.

The Bolton Weavers were affiliated to the Amalgamated Weavers' Association, and in 1947, Foley became the first woman to win election to its Central Committee. The following year, she was elected as secretary of the Bolton Weavers. At the time, the Manchester Guardian noted that she was "believed to be the first full-time woman trade union secretary in the cotton industry". It described her appointment as "belated but welcome", and noted that the weavers were ahead of the Cardroom Amalgamation in the matter.

Under Foley's leadership, working hours for weavers in Bolton were reduced, and wages increased. In 1956/57, she was the first woman to serve as president of the Bolton Trades Council. She retired in 1961, and was succeeded by her assistant, Hilda Unsworth. In retirement, she wrote her autobiography, which was published in 1973 as A Bolton Childhood.

Foley was made a Member of the Order of the British Empire in 1950, and received an honorary Master of Arts degree from the University of Manchester in 1961.

Trade union offices
Preceded by Cephas Speak	General Secretary of the Bolton Weavers' Association; 1948–1961	Succeeded by Hilda Unsworth
