= Stockport Card, Blowing and Ring Room Operatives' Association =

English trade union

Stockport Cardroom Association
- Stockport Card, Blowing and Ring Room Operatives' Association
- Merged into: South East Lancashire and Cheshire Textile Operatives' Association
- Founded: 1859
- Dissolved: 1967
- Headquarters: Textile Hall, Chestergate, Stockport
- Location: England
- Members: 3,349 (1936)
- Parent organization: Cardroom Amalgamation

Stockport Card, Blowing and Ring Room Operatives' Association was a trade union representing cotton industry workers in the Stockport area of Cheshire in England.

The union was founded in 1859, shortly after the Bolton Cardroom Association, the two being the oldest unions of cardroom workers to endure. In its early years, the union organised only strippers and grinders, and was only open to men. This caused problems in 1867 when women workers, who were not permitted to join the union, agreed to accept a 5 per cent cut in wages. As a result, the union lost a strike against a 10 per cent cut in its own members' wages.

The union was a founder constituent of the Cardroom Amalgamation in 1886, but at the time it had only 91 members, despite having broaden its base by becoming the Stockport Association of Card and Blowing Room Operatives, Ring and Throstle Spinners. However, this proved the start of a rapid growth in membership, which reached 670 by 1892, 1,023 in 1895, and 1,835 in 1908.

The union had adopted the name Stockport Card, Blowing and Ring Room Operatives' Association by 1919, and its membership continued growing, peaking at 3,349 in 1936, at which time it was the fifth-largest union of cardroom workers. It changed its name again, to the Stockport Card and Ring Spinning Room Operatives' Association.

Membership of the union declined in line with employment in the Lancashire cotton industry, and in 1967 it merged with the Hyde and District Card, Blowing and Ring Frame Operatives' Association and the South East Lancashire Provincial Card and Blowing Room Operatives' Association, forming the South East Lancashire and Cheshire Textile Operatives' Association.

== General Secretaries ==
F. Parker
1916: Joseph Frayne
1944: D. A. Mainds
1957: J. McKenzie
