= Luke Park =

British trade union leader

Luke Park (1840 – 28 September 1921) was a British trade union leader.

Born in Kirkham, Lancashire, Park began working as a handloom weaver when he was only eight years old. About ten years later, he moved to Preston to work on powerlooms in a mill, and he was an early member of the Preston and District Weavers', Winders' and Warpers' Association.

In 1875, Park was appointed as the general secretary of the Preston Weavers, and in this role, he supported the formation of the Amalgamated Weavers' Association (AWA). The Preston Weavers affiliated to the new union, and Park was elected as one of six members of its first central committee, alongside president David Holmes of Burnley, agent Joshua Barrows of Padiham, George Barker of Blackburn, A. Buckley of Oldham, and William Booth of Ashton.

In 1916, the AWA made Park an honorary member of its central committee, in recognition of his long service. He retired in 1919, and was given 100 guineas as a golden handshake. When he died, two years later, the Manchester Guardian described him as "the oldest trade union official in North and Mid Lancashire".

Trade union offices
Preceded by J. Swift	General Secretary of the Preston and District Weavers', Winders' and Warpers' Association; 1875–1919	Succeeded by R. J. H. Riding
