= Oldham Provincial Card and Blowing Room and Ring Frame Operatives' Association =

Former trade union of the United Kingdom

Oldham Cardroom Association
- Oldham Provincial Card and Blowing Room and Ring Frame Operatives' Association
- Merged into: GMB
- Founded: 1880
- Dissolved: 1986
- Headquarters: 108 Union Street, Oldham
- Location: England
- Members: 28,850 (1922)
- Parent organization: Amalgamated Association of Card and Blowing Room Operatives

The Oldham Provincial Card and Blowing Room and Ring Frame Operatives' Association was a trade union representing cotton industry workers in Oldham, Lancashire, in England. Long the largest union in the industry, it played a leading role in establishing a regional federation of cardroom workers.

While a union of workers involved in preparing cotton existing in Oldham by the early 1860s, it dissolved later in the decade. A second union was established in about 1870, but was dissolved at the end of that decade. The Oldham Card and Blowing Room Operatives' Association was established in 1880 as its replacement.

By 1885, the union had 1,279 members, which although only 10% of relevant workers in the town, still made it one of the largest cotton industry unions at the time. That year, there was a major strike in the industry, and many of the striking workers joined the union, raising its membership to more than 5,000. This enabled it to, for the first time, employ a full-time secretary, George Silk. Inspired by the successful Oldham Operative Cotton Spinners' Provincial Association, Silk restructured the union, also changing its name slightly to become the Oldham Provincial Card and Blowing Room Operatives' Association.

In 1886, the union played a leading role in founding the Amalgamated Association of Card and Blowing Room Operatives (Cardroom Amalgamation), Silk becoming its first president, and William Mullin, also from Oldham, its first secretary. Of the first executive committee, four out of five members were from Oldham. Initially, it formed about half the total membership of the amalgamation, although over time this dropped to one-third.

Silk launched campaigns to increase wages, and 1889 the union agreed a provisional wage list with local employers. In addition, the union began accepting ring frame operatives into membership, and in 1890 added them into its name. Membership reached 12,465 in 1892, and peaked at 28,850 in 1922, remaining over 20,000 until World War II.

Oldham was known for its significant number of Conservative Party supporters, and in 1894 it voted against supporting independent labour politicians. It did vote for the United Textile Factory Workers' Association to affiliate to the Labour Representation Committee in 1902, but by a smaller margin than other unions, and only 40% of members later contracted in to pay a political levy.

Membership of the union declined along with the Lancashire cotton industry, and in 1968 it merged with the Oldham and District Weavers', Winders', Reelers', Beam and Sectional Warpers' Association, forming the Oldham Provincial Union of Textile and Allied Workers In 1986, this merged into the GMB.

== General Secretaries ==
1885: George Silk
c.1900: Michael Connolly
1922: Archie Robertson
1953: Jim Browning
as of 1982: J. J. Martin and D. Lucas
