= Zeph Hutchinson =

British trade unionist and political activist

Zephaniah Hutchinson (2 November 1888 – 5 January 1959) was a British trade unionist and political activist. Known as the leading left-wing activist in the Lancashire cotton trade unions, he served for 28 years as leader of the Bacup Weavers' Association.

Born in Cowling, Craven, in Yorkshire, Hutchinson began working in a cotton mill in Colne at the age of twelve. Three years later, he joined the Colne Weavers' Association. He later moved to work in Nelson, becoming a prominent activist in the Nelson Weavers' Association.

While in Nelson, Hutchinson joined the Independent Labour Party (ILP). He became the ILP's leading member in the cotton trade unions, and in this role tried, unsuccessfully, to get the United Textile Factory Workers' Association (UTFWA) to adopt Philip Snowden as a candidate in the 1920 Nelson and Colne by-election.

The ILP was affiliated to the Labour Party, which appointed Hutchinson as a circulation organiser for its newspaper, the Daily Citizen. The paper proved short-lived, and Hutchinson moved on to work for The Daily News. He married, and decided to return to weaving, but remained active in the Labour Party, for which he stood unsuccessfully in Chorley at the 1923 and 1924 United Kingdom general elections. His candidacy was funded by the UTFWA, the only left-wing candidate it backed in this period.

Hutchinson was keen to progress in the trade union movement, but was unsuccessful for many years as his maths skills were poor, and these were considered vital for cotton trade union leaders. Eventually, in 1926, he was appointed as the full-time general secretary of the Bacup Weavers', Winders' and Beamers' Association. He proved highly effective, tripling the union's membership within three months. He chaired the Bacup Textile Trades Federation, and also wrote widely about weaving. During the more looms dispute of the early 1930s, he led a delegation to Parliament, largely consisting of Nelson Weavers officials. This was successful in getting employers to back down, although the victory was short-lived.

Hutchinson remained the leading left-wing member of the cotton unions, and led opposition to UTFWA calls for a new Cotton Control Board, arguing instead for the nationalisation of the industry. However, the Communist Party of Great Britain and its National Minority Movement, led in the cotton industry by Harold Dickinson, refused to work with him. By 1933, he had left the ILP and joined the Socialist League.

Hutchinson retired in 1954, and died in 1959.

Trade union offices
Preceded by Robert Green	General Secretary of the Bacup Weavers' Association; 1926–1952	Succeeded by Position abolished
Preceded by New position	General Secretary of the Todmorden, Bacup and District Weavers' Association; 1952–1954	Succeeded by W. S. Mellor
