= Rossendale Weavers', Winders' and Beamers' Association =

English trade union representing cotton industry workers

Rossendale Weavers' Association
- Rossendale Weavers', Winders' and Beamers' Association
- Merged into: Burnley, Nelson, Rossendale and District Textile Workers' Union
- Founded: 1873
- Dissolved: 1977
- Headquarters: 245 Bacup Road, Rawtenstall
- Location: England
- Members: 2,800 (in 1907)
- Affiliations: North East Lancashire Amalgamated Weavers' Association (1877–1880); Amalgamated Weavers' Association (1892–1974); Amalgamated Textile Workers' Union (1974–1977)

The Rossendale Weavers', Winders' and Beamers' Association was a trade union representing cotton industry workers in the Rossendale area of Lancashire in England.

The union was founded in 1873, and affiliated to the North East Lancashire Amalgamated Weavers' Association in 1877. It left this "First Amalgamation" in 1880 and remained unaffiliated until 1892, when it belatedly joined the Amalgamated Weavers' Association.

By the 1890s, the union had more than 1,500 members, and this continued to grow, reaching 2,800 in 1907 before falling back a little to 2,000 by 1920. Thereafter, it declined in line with employment in the Lancashire textile trade, falling to only 1,020 in 1960. That year, the Haslingden Weavers' Association merged in, the union relocating its office to Haslingden, and renamed itself as the Rossendale Valley Textile Workers' Association, membership recovering to 2,555.

In 1977, the union merged into the Burnley, Nelson and District Textile Workers' Union, which accordingly renamed itself as the Burnley, Nelson, Rossendale and District Textile Workers' Union.

== General Secretaries ==
J. Wright
1890s: John Farron
1926: Albert Lomax
1960: Mary Abbott
