= Walter Gee (trade unionist) =

Former British trade union leader and politician

Walter Gee (died 14 June 1924) was a British trade union leader and politician.

Gee live in Hyde, and came to prominence in the Hyde and District Cardroom Workers' Association, in time being elected as its secretary. The union was affiliated to the Cardroom Workers' Amalgamation (CWA), and in about 1894, he was elected to its executive committee. The CWA was, in turn, affiliated to the United Textile Factory Workers' Association, and Gee was elected as its president in 1919, winning re-election each year thereafter.

Gee was also elected to Hyde Town Council and served for six years around the turn of the century. In his spare time, he served as a magistrate.

Gee became seriously ill early in 1924 and died in June.

Trade union offices
Preceded by ?	General Secretary of the Hyde and District Card, Blowing and Ring Frame Operatives' Association; 1890s–1924	Succeeded by F. Grimes
Preceded by Alfred Smalley and David Watts Morgan	Auditor of the Trades Union Congress; 1907; With: S. H. Whitehouse	Succeeded by Alfred Smalley and S. H. Whitehouse
Preceded by William C. Robinson	President of the United Textile Factory Workers' Association; 1919–1924	Succeeded by William Thomasson
