= Archie Robertson (trade unionist) =

British trade unionist

Archibald Colin Campbell Robertson (23 December 1886 – 31 December 1961) was a British trade unionist who served as president of the United Textile Factory Workers' Association (UTFWA).

Robertson came to prominence in 1922, when he was elected as the secretary of the Oldham Provincial Card and Blowing Room and Ring Frame Operatives' Association. The Oldham Association was affiliated to the Amalgamated Association of Card and Blowing and Ring Room Operatives, and in 1936 Robertson was also elected as its president.

The United Textile Factory Workers' Association co-ordinated the political activity of the cotton trade unions, and in 1935 Robertson was additionally elected as its president. Raymond Streat considered him to be one of the more militant members of the executive, tending to lead the opposition to the more moderate approach of Alfred Roberts.

Robertson's period of trade union leadership coincided with a lengthy decline in the cotton trade, but Robertson was noted for his personal cheerfulness. From 1952 to 1954, he served as the chair of the General Federation of Trade Unions, retiring from his other trade union posts in 1953.

Trade union offices
Preceded by Michael Connolly	General Secretary of the Oldham Cardroom Association; 1922–1953	Succeeded by Jim Browning
Preceded by William Thomasson	President of the United Textile Factory Workers' Association; 1935–1953	Succeeded by William Roberts
Preceded by Joseph Frayne	President of the Cardroom Amalgamation; 1936–1953	Succeeded by Harold Chorlton
Preceded by Albert Knowles	Chair of the General Federation of Trade Unions; 1952–1954	Succeeded by Cecil Heap
