= Harry Kershaw (trade unionist) =

British trade unionist (1906–1985)

Harry Clement Kershaw (3 October 1906 – 3 June 1985) was a British trade unionist.

Born in Rossendale, Kershaw worked part-time for his father. He then moved with his family to Barnoldswick, where he worked as a half-timer in a cotton mill. When he was thirteen, he began working full-time as a weaver, and joined the Barnoldswick Weavers' Association, in which his father was an official. He joined the Communist Party of Great Britain (CPGB) when he was nineteen, and in 1929 he was sacked for his trade union activity. Initially, he was refused unemployment benefit, but a court determined that his activity was justified, and he was paid the benefit. However, he was unable to find work at the local mills, and instead went to work for a year in the Soviet Union.

In 1944, Kershaw began working full-time for the Colne Weavers' Association. He was elected as Assistant Secretary of the association 1945. The association was a member of the Amalgamated Weavers' Association, and Kershaw was elected as its full-time Second Assistant Secretary in 1947, becoming Assistant Secretary in 1960, then General Secretary in September 1968, spending his first month working alongside Lewis Wright. He retired in 1971.

Trade union offices
Preceded by Lewis Wright	General Secretary of the Amalgamated Weavers' Association; 1968 – 1971	Succeeded by Fred Hague
