= James Crinion =

British trade unionist

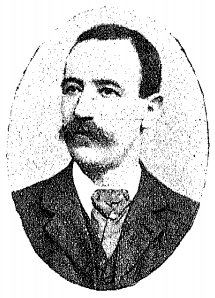
Crinion in 1901

James Crinion (1860 – 13 August 1932) was a British trade unionist.

Born in Lees, near Oldham, Lancashire, he worked as a spinner in a cotton mill from an early age. When his family moved to Chadderton, he became involved in the Cardroom Amalgamation, and was soon secretary of the local branch of its Oldham affiliate. The Amalgamation was nearly bankrupted by a strike in 1893, but Crinion worked with its secretary, William Mullin, to rebuild it, and was rewarded in 1896, when he was elected as president.

Crinion was able to greatly increase membership of the Amalgamation, and gained prominence in the wider trade union movement. He served as a trustee of the General Federation of Trade Unions, and in 1911 was the Trades Union Congress' delegate to the American Federation of Labour. He was critical of the Labour Party and took no part in it, although he was nominally a Labour candidate when he stood unsuccessfully in Royton at the 1918 general election.

In later years, Crinion was known for stressing the importance of health and safety in cotton mills, particularly the need to reduce dust levels. He retired as president of the Amalgamation in 1926, after suffering poor health, and finally as President of its Oldham affiliate in 1930.

Trade union offices
Preceded by Enoch Jones	President of the Cardroom Amalgamation; 1896 – 1926	Succeeded by Joseph Frayne
Preceded by William Brace and Ben Turner	Trades Union Congress representative to the American Federation of Labour; 1911; With: George Henry Roberts	Succeeded by James Andrew Seddon and Robert Smillie
