= Great Harwood Power Loom Weavers' Association =

Former trade union of the United Kingdom

Great Harwood Weavers' Association
- Great Harwood Power Loom Weavers' Association
- Founded: 1858
- Headquarters: 8 Town Hall Street, Great Harwood
- Location: England
- Members: 5,382 (1920)
- Parent organization: North East Lancashire Amalgamated Weavers' Association (1858–1900); Amalgamated Weavers' Association (1884–1974)

The Great Harwood Power Loom Weavers' Association was a trade union representing cotton weavers in the Great Harwood area of Lancashire, in England.

The union was founded in 1858, as the Harwood Branch of the East Lancashire Power Loom Weavers' Association, the association being the early name of the North East Lancashire Amalgamated Weavers' Association, or "First Amalgamation". Initially, it met in secrecy, in a delph, and its members were locked out, but thanks a donation of £846 from the Blackburn Weavers' Friendly Society, it survived. By 1863 it was operating on a firmer footing, and affiliated in its own right, as the Great Harwood and Billington Power Loom Weavers' Association, covering not only Harwood, but also Billington, Rishton, Whalley and York. The Rishton Weavers' Association split away from the Harwood union in 1878.

In 1884, the Amalgamated Weavers' Association was formed, and the union was a founder member, although it remained active in the First Amalgamation until 1900. By then, it had a membership of 4,123, roughly evenly split between men and women. Although membership dropped to only 3,800 in 1910, it then grew again, peaking at 5,382 in 1920.

From the 1930s, the cotton industry in Lancashire began to decline, and the union lost members. This was partially offset in 1932, when the Sabden Weavers' Association merged in, and in 1962 remaining members of the dissolved Clayton Weavers' Association. Despite this, by 1964, membership was down to 1,080. The following year, the Rishton Weavers' Association finally rejoined. At some date after this, the Harwood union appears to have merged into the Blackburn and District Weavers', Winders' and Warpers' Association.

== General Secretaries ==
F. Nuttall
1900s: W. Hesmondhalgh
1928: John Willie Hudson
1930: Bill Sunderland
c.1950: J. Booth
1950s: E. Hothersall
1960s: J. Rutter
