= Preston and District Weavers', Winders' and Warpers' Association =

Former trade union of the United Kingdom

Preston Weavers' Association
- Preston and District Weavers', Winders' and Warpers' Association
- Merged into: North West Lancashire, Durham and Cumbria Textile Workers' Union
- Founded: 1858; 168 years ago
- Dissolved: 1982; 44 years ago
- Headquarters: Textile Centre, 6 Sedgwick Street, Preston
- Location: England
- Members: 13,000 (1920)
- Parent organization: Amalgamated Weavers' Association (1884–1974); Amalgamated Textile Workers' Union (1974–1982)

The Preston and District Weavers', Winders' and Warpers' Association was a trade union representing cotton weavers in the Preston, Lancashire, in England.

The union was founded in 1858 as the Preston Power Loom Weavers' Association, although a predecessor of the same name had operated at times from 1842 onwards. The union decided against joining the North East Lancashire Amalgamated Weavers' Association, but in 1884 it became a founder member of the Amalgamated Weavers' Association.

The union grew steadily, reaching 5,388 members in 1892, 7,300 members in 1910, and reaching a peak of 13,000 members in 1920. In 1912, the union voted to pay a political levy to the Labour Party. A minority of members objected strongly to this, and 2,340 of them split away, forming the rival Preston Power Loom Weavers', Winders' and Warpers' Protection Society. Membership of this union failed to grow, and in 1921 it rejoined the Preston Weavers.

The small Bamber Bridge and District Weavers', Winders' and Warpers' Association merged into the Preston Weavers in 1940, but membership fell in line with the decline in the Lancashire cotton industry, dropping to only 4,050 by 1960. It had long worked closely with the Lancaster and District Weavers', Winders' and Warpers' Association, and with another union based in Carlisle, and in 1970 these merged into the Preston Weavers. In response to its broader remit, the union renamed itself as the North Lancashire and Cumbria Textile Workers' Association.

In 1982, the union merged with the Bolton and District Union of Textile and Allied Workers, the Bolton and District Power Loom Weavers', Winders', Warpers' and Loom Sweepers' Association, and the Wigan, Chorley and Skelmersdale District of the Amalgamated Textile Trades Union, forming the North West Lancashire, Durham and Cumbria Textile Workers' Union. This merged into the GMB four years later.

== General secretaries ==
1858: J. Swift
1875: Luke Park
1919: R. J. H. Riding
1920s: T. Sumner
1941: G. Gardner
1950s: Fred Fleetwood
as of 1970: G. F. Jones
