= Harold Bradley (trade unionist) =

British trade unionist

Harold Bradley (13 February 1895 – 1979) was a British trade unionist.

Bradley worked as a weaver in Nelson, Lancashire, and joined the Nelson Weavers' Association (NWA). He first came to attention when he led an unofficial strike at Cornes Mill, successfully demanding recognition of the union. Seth Sagar of the Communist Party of Great Britain (CPGB) saw potential in Bradley and persuaded him to join the party, and also to become a collector for the union. Shortly after, Bradley won election to the committee of the NWA.

In 1933, Bradley left Nelson to become secretary of the Darwen Weavers' Association. He remained in this post for many years, eventually leaving the CPGB and joining the Labour Party, for which he stood unsuccessfully at the 1951 general election in Clitheroe.

Both the Nelson and Darwen Weavers' Associations were part of the Amalgamated Weavers' Association, of which Bradley was appointed as acting president in 1953, then won an election to the presidency in May 1954. He retired in May 1960.

Trade union offices
Preceded by J. K. Bailey	General Secretary of the Darwen Weavers' Association; 1933–1960	Succeeded by Position abolished
Preceded by Ernest Thornton	Secretary of the United Textile Factory Workers' Association; 1953–1958	Succeeded by James Milhench
Preceded by Lewis Wright	President of the Amalgamated Weavers' Association; 1954–1960	Succeeded by Ernest Thornton
