= Rochdale Card and Blowing Room Operatives' Association =

Former trade union of the United Kingdom

- Merged into: Central Lancashire and Calderdale Amalgamated Textile Workers' Union
- Founded: 1879
- Dissolved: 1984
- Headquarters: 5 Bailie Street, Rochdale
- Location: England
- Members: 7,770 (1919)
- Key people: Harold Chorlton (Gen Sec)
- Parent organization: Cardroom Amalgamation (1885–1974); Amalgamated Textile Workers' Union (1974–1984)

The Rochdale Card and Blowing Room Operatives' Association was a trade union representing cotton industry workers in the Rochdale area of Lancashire in England.

The union was founded in 1879 as the Rochdale Male and Female Card and Blowing Room and Ring Spinners' Association, and registered with the Board of Trade two years later. It was initially very small, with only 180 members in 1886. That year, it became a founder member of the Cardroom Workers' Amalgamation (CWA), and its membership rapidly increased, reaching 1,800 by 1892. After ten years of stagnation, it then grew rapidly once more, and in 1907 the Todmorden Cardroom Association merged in. Membership peaked at 7,770 in 1919, and despite dropping in the early 1920s, it recovered to 7,612 in 1936.

After World War II, membership of the union fell in line with employment in the Lancashire cotton industry, but general secretary Harold Chorlton became the leader of the CWA, and the Rochdale union remained one of its most important affiliates. The Heywood Cardroom Association merged into the Rochdale union in 1967 and, to reflect this change, in 1970 the union became the National Union of Textile and Allied Workers, Rochdale and Districts. Following further membership declines, in 1984 the union merged into the Central Lancashire and Calderdale Amalgamated Textile Workers' Union, which two years later joined the GMB.

== General Secretaries ==
J. J. Kingsley
1930: Harold Chorlton
1963: A. Belfield
