= Oldham and District Weavers', Winders', Reelers', Beam and Sectional Warpers' Association =

Former trade union of the United Kingdom

Oldham Weavers' Association
- Oldham and District Weavers', Winders', Reelers', Beam and Sectional Warpers' Association
- Merged into: Oldham Provincial Union of Textile and Allied Workers
- Founded: 1859
- Dissolved: 1968
- Headquarters: Bartlam Place, Oldham
- Location: England
- Members: 9,500 (1920)
- Parent organization: Amalgamated Weavers' Association

The Oldham and District Weavers', Winders', Reelers', Beam and Sectional Warpers' Association was a trade union representing cotton workers in an area centred on Oldham in Lancashire, England.

Unions of cotton weavers were established in Oldham in the 1830s and around 1850, but neither endured. In 1859, another union was founded, and this one proved enduring. It initially covered a wide area, from Hebden Bridge in Yorkshire to Castleton near Rochdale, and proved successful in maintaining its membership and building up funds. As a result, it felt no need to join the North East Lancashire Amalgamated Weavers' Association, although in 1884 it was a founder member of the new Amalgamated Weavers' Association.

By the 1890s, members of the union had reached 4,000, and it peaked at 9,500 in 1920. Almost all of these members were women - in 1900, it had only 71 male members - but its leaders were men until well into the 20th-century.

Membership of the union declined slowly, along with the Lancashire cotton industry, and by 1960 it was down to 5,000. In 1968, it merged with the Oldham Provincial Card and Blowing Room and Ring Frame Operatives' Association, forming the Oldham Provincial Union of Textile and Allied Workers. In 1986, this merged into the GMB.

== General Secretaries ==
A. Birtles
1905: James Bell
1946: James Milhench
D. Lucas
A. Manley
1960s: M. Shaw
