= Darwen Weavers', Winders' and Warpers' Association =

Former trade union of the United Kingdom

Darwen Weavers' Association
- Darwen Weavers', Winders' and Warpers' Association
- Predecessor: Blackburn Weavers' Association
- Merged into: Blackburn Weavers' Association
- Founded: 1857
- Dissolved: 1960
- Headquarters: Weavers' Institute, The Green, Darwen
- Location: England
- Members: 8,298 (1907)
- Parent organization: Amalgamated Weavers' Association

The Darwen Weavers', Winders' and Warpers' Association was a trade union representing cotton industry workers in Darwen, Lancashire, in England. As the main industry in the town, the union has been influential in its history, and some of its leaders became significant national figures.

In the early 1850s, cotton industry workers in Darwen could join the Blackburn Weavers', Winders' and Warpers' Association, but disputes over attempts to form a federation of weavers' unions led members in Darwen to split away and form their own union in 1857. The following year, the North East Lancashire Amalgamated Weavers' Association was established, Darwen joining while Blackburn remained outside. However, Darwen soon left this "First Amalgamation", only rejoining in 1863. In 1885, it also joined the new Amalgamated Weavers' Association.

Membership of the union grew steadily, reaching 5,500 in 1888, and 8,298 in 1907. Following World War I, the industry went into decline, with many job losses, and by 1960 the union was down to only 1,000 members. That year, it finally merged back into the Blackburn union.

== General Secretaries ==
1857: Entwistle Entwistle
1892: Joseph Cross
1894: David Shackleton
1907: John Parkington
1922: Joseph Kay Bailey
1933: Harold Bradley
