= Nelson Weavers' Association =

Former trade union of the United Kingdom

- Nelson and District Power-Loom Weavers' Association
- Merged into: Burnley, Nelson and District Textile Workers' Union
- Founded: 1870
- Dissolved: 1966
- Headquarters: Weavers' Institute, Pendle Street, Nelson
- Location: England
- Members: 18,000 (1920)
- Publication: The Power Loom
- Parent organization: Amalgamated Weavers' Association

The Nelson Weavers' Association (NWA) was a trade union representing cotton weavers in the area of Nelson, Lancashire. As the main industry in the town, the union has been influential in its history, and some of its leaders became significant national figures.

== History ==
Although there was a weavers' union in Nelson by 1860, this appears to have dissolved, and was replaced by the Nelson and District Power-Loom Weavers' Association in 1870. This was initially a branch of the North East Lancashire Amalgamated Weavers' Association, but it soon adopted an independent existence, affiliating to the Amalgamated Weavers' Association (AWA) on its formation in 1884, and leaving the first amalgamation in 1892.

By 1884, the union only 400 members, but this steadily grew, as the union saw success. In 1891, it won the right to collective bargaining with employers. The following year, it undertook its first strike, in protest at two overlookers named Evans and Berry, who were sexually harassing women members. Following the action, employers offered that the overlookers would only work mornings, a deal the union leadership was willing to agree, but members voted to reject this. Evans and Berry then took the union to a tribunal, but lost, and then left the area.

The Nelson union was one of the first larger cotton industry unions to support independent labour representation. It stood its first independent candidate in a local election in 1890, and over the course of the decade, both the Social Democratic Federation and the Independent Labour Party gained much support from union members and influence in its activities. The union was a founder member of the Labour Representation Committee and, thanks to the union's backing, Labour held a majority on the town council from 1905. It was largely as a result of the union's efforts that cotton trade unionist David Shackleton was elected as the local Member of Parliament at the Clitheroe by-election, 1902.

Membership of the union reached 4,000 in 1892, and more than 12,000 by 1910, peaking at 18,000 in 1920. In 1912, 420 Catholic members split away to form the rival Nelson and District Weavers' Protection Society. The association struck in opposition to their continued employment, but this was resolved when employers offered compensatory payments to association members. The Protection Society steadily lost members until it was dissolved, in 1921, the few remaining members rejoining the association.

In 1911, union collectors went on strike after their take was reduced. This was resolved by the union founding a separate insurance society, offering new opportunities for the collectors to increase their income.

From 1920, the local cotton industry entered a long decline. The AWA and the United Textile Factory Workers' Association agreed wage reductions in 1921, an action which the Nelson Weavers opposed. There followed a number of disputes. In 1928, union members at Mather Brothers mill struck over the sacking of John Husband, the vice-president of the union. This led to a seven-week lock-out at mills across the town. The AWA did not support the locked-out workers, and they failed to get Husband re-appointed, although the union felt that the action led to improved conditions for workers more generally. In 1931, the union took part in the AWA strike over workers being asked to manage more looms. The union felt that the AWA was too keen to settle the action and, on a proposal of ILP members, sent its own delegation to meet with Arthur Greenwood and ILP Members of Parliament. This succeeded in getting the proposal abandoned, but it emerged again the following year and was then agreed by the AWA.

Despite a gradual decline in membership, by 1935 the union was the largest affiliate of the AWA, and by 1941 it retained 10,000 members. In 1960, the union was renamed as the Nelson and District Weavers' Association. Membership had fallen to only 3,000 in 1964, and in 1966, it merged with the Burnley and District Weavers', Winders' and Beamers' Association, forming the Burnley, Nelson and District Textile Workers' Union.

== General Secretaries ==
1870: David Rushton
1886: William Ward
1923: James Helm
1928: Carey Hargreaves
1949: James Butterfield
1957: Albert Shaw
