= Fred Hague =

British trade unionist

Fred Garfield Hague (29 September 1911 – 13 November 1984) was a British trade unionist.

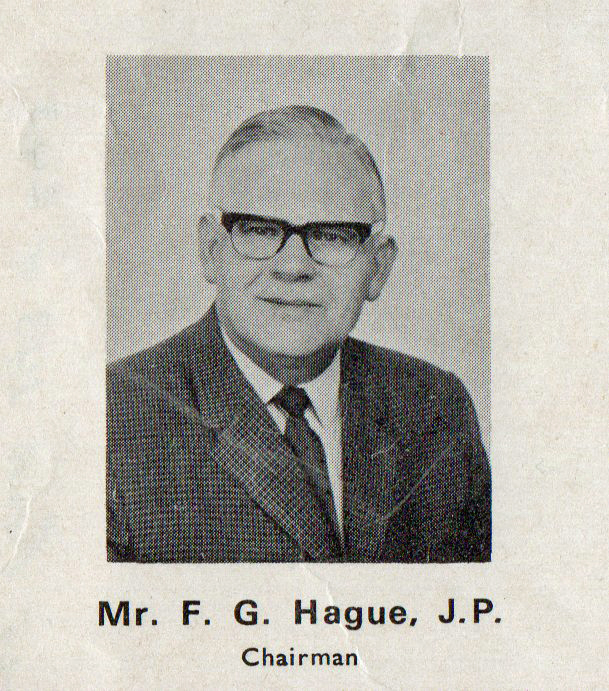
Fred G Hague

Hague was born in Dixon Street, Crossbank, Waterhead, Oldham. He worked as a cotton weaver. He studied at Oldham Technical College and held the honours certificate of the City and Guilds in plain and fancy weaving, and advanced certificates in spinning. He also attended Oldham School of Commerce to study spinners' costings and W.E.A. classes in economics. He then joined the staff of Oldham Technical College as a teacher of cotton weaving. In 1939 Mr. Hague was appointed organiser and collector for the Shaw district of Oldham Weavers' Association. and joined the Ashton-under-Lyne and District Weavers' Association in 1940. He was elected as its general secretary by the mid-1950s, and also became prominent in the Amalgamated Weavers' Association, to which it was affiliated. He joined the Army in 1940 and on demobilisation in 1945 was appointed to the Middleton branch. He became a Blackburn magistrate in 1951. He was a governor of Blackburn Technical College, and a member since its inception of the Blackburn Executive Council for the Health Services.

Hague was elected as President of the Weavers' Amalgamation in 1964. He stood down in 1968 to serve a year as Chairman of the General Federation of Trade Unions, then in 1971 was elected as General Secretary of the Amalgamation. He negotiated a merger with the National Union of Textile and Allied Workers which formed the Amalgamated Textile Workers' Union, serving as its joint General Secretary for a year, then solo for a further year, when he retired.

He died in Oldham, Lancashire in 1984.

Trade union offices
Preceded by G. Bannister	General Secretary of the Blackburn Weavers' Association; 1946 – 1951	Succeeded by John Casson
Preceded by Lewis Wright	General Secretary of the Ashton Weavers' Association; 1953 – 1971	Succeeded by Position abolished
Preceded by Ernest Thornton	President of the Amalgamated Weavers' Association; 1964 – 1968	Succeeded by Hilda Unsworth
Preceded by F. C. Henry	Chairman of the General Federation of Trade Unions; 1969	Succeeded by Jim Browning
Preceded by Harry Kershaw	General Secretary of the Amalgamated Weavers' Association; 1971 – 1974	Succeeded by Position abolished
Preceded by New position	General Secretary of the National Union of Textile and Allied Workers; 1974 – 1976; With: Joe King (1974 – 1975)	Succeeded by Jack Brown
