= Joe King (trade unionist) =

British trade unionist

Joseph King (28 November 1914 – 21 September 1989) was a British trade unionist.

King grew up in Atherton and left school at the age of fourteen, finding work in a local cotton mill. He joined the Amalgamated Association of Card and Blowing and Ring Room Operatives (Cardroom Amalgamation), and also the Labour Party; in 1949, he was elected to Tyldesley Urban District Council.

King subsequently became a full-time organiser for the Cardroom Amalgamation, then the secretary of its affiliate, the North East Lancashire Card and Blowing Room Operatives' and Ring Spinners' Association. In 1962, he was elected as the union's general secretary, and served on the General Council of the Trades Union Congress from 1972. During this period, the cotton industry was in steep decline, and King negotiated a merger with the Amalgamated Weavers' Association in 1974, forming the Amalgamated Textile Workers' Union; he served as joint general secretary of the new union for a year. In 1975, King became an adviser to the Advisory, Conciliation and Arbitration Service, serving for three years.

In his spare time, King was the founder and president of the Accrington Pakistan Friendship Association, and he also served as a magistrate.

Trade union offices
Preceded by Alfred Roberts	General Secretary of the Cardroom Amalgamation; 1962–1974	Succeeded by Position abolished
Preceded by New position	General Secretary of the Amalgamated Textile Workers' Union; 1974–1975; With: Fred Hague	Succeeded by Fred Hague
Preceded by Jack Peel	Textiles Group representative on the General Council of the Trades Union Congress; 1972 – 1975	Succeeded by Fred Dyson
