= Chorley and District Weavers', Winders', Warpers' and Reelers' Association =

Former trade union of the United Kingdom

Chorley Weavers' Association
- Chorley and District Weavers', Winders', Warpers' and Reelers' Association
- Founded: 1855
- Dissolved: 1956
- Headquarters: 1 Clifford Street, Chorley, Lancashire
- Location: England
- Members: 4,840 (1920)
- Parent organization: North East Lancashire Amalgamated Weavers' Association (1863–1884, 1886–1892); Amalgamated Weavers' Association (1884–1956)

The Chorley and District Weavers', Winders', Warpers' and Reelers' Association was a trade union representing cotton industry workers in the area of Chorley, Lancashire, in England.

The union was founded in 1855 as the Chorley Weavers' Association. It affiliated to the North East Lancashire Amalgamated Weavers' Association in 1863, but left in 1884 to become a founder member of the new Amalgamated Weavers' Association. It soon decided that it could be a member of both, rejoining the First Amalgamation in 1886, though it left once more in 1892.

By the 1890s, the union had three district branches and about 3,000 members. Although this continued to increase, it decided to merge all the branches into the central organisation in about 1900. Membership peaked at 4,840 in 1920, but then declined rapidly, along with employment in the Lancashire cotton industry.

By 1956, membership of the union was down to only 662, and it was decided to dissolve the organisation. Most members joined the Wigan Weavers' Association, although members in Wheelton instead transferred to the Blackburn Weavers' Association.

== General Secretaries ==
1890s: William Mellor
1910: John Wilson
1914: T. West
1932: T. Starkey
