= John Lee (trade unionist) =

British trade union leader

John Lee (died 18 October 1963) was a British trade union leader.

Lee lived in Rochdale and worked in a textile warehouse. He joined his local union, and was soon elected as its general secretary. The union was affiliated to the Amalgamated Textile Warehousemen's Association (ATWA), and in 1926 he was elected as general secretary of the ATWA. He gradually came to greater prominence, winning election to the management committee of the General Federation of Trade Unions (GFTU) in 1931, succeeding Edward Duxbury as chairman of the Northern Counties Textile Trades Federation in 1934, and being made an Officer of the Order of the British Empire in 1937.

In 1940/41, Lee served as chair of the GFTU. By this time, he also served on the legislative council of the United Textile Factory Workers' Association, and represented it at the International Federation of Textile Workers' Associations. He retired from all his trade union posts in 1950.

Lee died in 1963. In his spare time, he served as a magistrate.

Trade union offices
Preceded by Edward Strong	General Secretary of the Amalgamated Textile Warehousemen's Association; 1926–1950	Succeeded by Thomas Ashe
Preceded by Andrew Naesmith	Chair of the General Federation of Trade Unions; 1940–1942	Succeeded by Albert Taylor
