= William Thomasson (trade unionist) =

British trade unionist

William Thomasson OBE JP (20 February 1867 – 19 March 1940) was a British trade unionist.

Thomasson was born in Bolton, Lancashire, England, to John and Jane Thomasson. He joined the Bolton and District Card, Blowing and Ring Room Operatives' Provincial Association and soon began working for the union, firstly collecting dues, then as an organiser. He was subsequently chosen as secretary of the Atherton Cardroom Union, then in 1920 was elected as General Secretary of the Amalgamated Association of Card and Blowing Room Operatives. From 1924, he also served as president of the United Textile Factory Workers' Association. He was appointed an Officer of the Order of the British Empire (OBE) in the 1935 Birthday Honours.

By 1935, Thomasson was in poor health, and resigned from all his trade union positions. He died in March 1940.

Trade union offices
Preceded by William Mullin	General Secretary of the Amalgamated Association of Card and Blowing Room Operatives; 1920–1935	Succeeded by Alfred Roberts
Preceded by Walter Gee	President of the United Textile Factory Workers' Association; 1924–1935	Succeeded by Archie Robertson
