= Cephas Speak =

British trade union leader

Cephas Speak (2 April 1873 – 18 December 1958) was a British trade union leader who served as secretary of the United Textile Factory Workers' Association.

Speak grew up in Burnley, and began working at a local cotton mill as a loom sweeper when he was ten years old. He became active in the Burnley Weavers' Association, and after twenty-five years was employed part-time as the assistant secretary of the Oldham Weavers' Association. After a few months, he left this job to become assistant secretary of the Bolton Weavers' Association, then in 1910, he became the first full-time secretary of the Bolton Weavers. The following year, he was also appointed as a magistrate in Bolton.

In 1931, Speak was additionally elected as secretary of the United Textile Factory Workers' Association, serving until 1943. He finally retired from his Bolton Weavers post in 1948, at the age of 77, having held the position for 38 years.

Trade union offices
Preceded by William Melling	General Secretary of the Bolton Weavers' Association; 1910–1948	Succeeded by Alice Foley
Preceded by James Bell	General Secretary of the United Textile Factory Workers' Association; 1931–1943	Succeeded by Ernest Thornton
