= Hilda Unsworth =

British trade union leader

- Born: 11 November 1918
- Died: 26 November 2015 (aged 97)
- Organizations: Bolton Weavers' Association; Amalgamated Weavers' Association

Hilda Peace Unsworth (11 November 1918 – 26 November 2015) was a British trade union leader who served as the last president of the Amalgamated Weavers' Association.

== Early life ==
Unsworth was born in Bolton on Armistice Day, and as a result was given the middle name "Peace".

== Career ==
Unsworth worked in a cotton mill for many years and became involved in the Bolton Weavers' Association. The Bolton Weavers were unusual among trade unions in that a woman, Alice Foley, held a prominent position, becoming secretary in 1948. Unsworth became Foley's assistant, and when Foley retired, in 1961, Unsworth succeeded her as the full-time secretary of the union.

Unsworth's period as secretary included the centenary of the founding of the union, and to mark this, she and her assistants visited every mill in the town and gave each member £1.

In 1970, Unsworth was elected as the president of the Amalgamated Weavers' Association (AWA), the first woman to hold the post. This enabled her to take part in numerous trade union delegations overseas, on which she would prioritise investigating equal rights, maternity care and the position of women prisoners.

Unsworth was also the second woman to serve as president of the Bolton Trades Council. The AWA became part of the Amalgamated Textile Workers' Union in 1974, but Unsworth remained leader of the Bolton Weavers until her retirement in 1978. In retirement, she served as a magistrate, and was chair and president of the Queen Street Mission Trust for many years.

Trade union offices
Preceded by Alice Foley	General Secretary of the Bolton Weavers' Association; 1961–1978	Succeeded by ?
Preceded by Fred Hague	President of the Amalgamated Weavers' Association; 1970–1974	Succeeded by Position abolished
