= Hyde and District Weavers', Winders', Warpers' and Doublers' Association =

Former trade union of the United Kingdom

Hyde Weavers' Association
- Hyde and District Weavers', Winders', Warpers' and Doublers' Association
- Merged into: South East Lancashire and Cheshire Weavers' and Winders' Association
- Founded: 1880
- Dissolved: 1972
- Headquarters: 27 George Street, Hyde
- Location: England
- Members: 7,200 (1910)
- Parent organization: Amalgamated Weavers' Association

The Hyde and District Weavers', Winders', Warpers' and Doublers' Association was a trade union representing workers in the cotton industry around Hyde, then in Cheshire and Derbyshire in England.

There was a friendly society of weavers in the Hyde area in the 1870s but, by 1880, this appears to have become inactive. The year, the Hyde, Hadfield and District Weavers' Association was established, its Hadfield branch being established in 1881. In 1884, it was a founder member of the Amalgamated Weavers' Association.

The union grew quickly, with branches in other local towns and villages, and had 4,500 members by the 1890s. Unlike unions in many other industries, the large majority of its members were women. By 1906, long-term general secretary William Pope was in post, and that year he helped set up the nearby Stockport Weavers' Association.

By 1910, the union recognised its broader membership by adopting the name Hyde, Hadfield, Compstall, Broadbottom and Marple Weavers', Winders' and Warpers' Association. At this time, it had 7,200 members. In 1922, the small Glossop and District Power Loom Weavers union merged into it, but Glossop was not appended to its name.

Membership of the union declined along with the British cotton industry, and by 1968 it was down to only 550. That year, it shortened its name to the "Hyde and District Weavers', Winders' and Doublers' Association". In 1972, the union merged with the Ashton-under-Lyne and District Power-Loom Weavers' Association and the Stockport and District Weavers', Winders', Warpers' and Reelers' Association, forming the South East Lancashire and Cheshire Weavers' and Winders' Association.

== General Secretaries ==
William Bancroft
1890s: J. Challenor
T. Lloyd
1900s: William Pope
1942: H. A. Taylor
1960s: L. H. Seel
