= North West Lancashire, Durham and Cumbria Textile Workers' Union =

English trade union

The North West Lancashire, Durham and Cumbria Textile Workers' Union (NWLDCTWU) was a trade union representing workers in the textile industry in part of North West England.

The union was founded in 1982, when the Bolton and District Union of Textile and Allied Workers merged with the Bolton and District Power Loom Weavers', Winders', Warpers' and Loom Sweepers' Association, the North Lancashire and Cumbria Textile Workers' Association, and the Wigan, Chorley and Skelmersdale District of the Amalgamated Textile Trades Union. Like all its predecessors, it affiliated to the Amalgamated Textile Workers' Union (ATWU), and its general secretary was Joe Quinn, who also served as president of the ATWU.

Although the Lancashire cotton industry was in sharp decline in the 1980s, the union was relatively resilient, and lost only 4% of its membership during its existence. By 1986, it had 4,741 members, and held £145 in assets for each member. In April 1986, it union merged into the GMB union.
