= Luke Bates =

British trade union leader

Luke Bates (1873 – January 1943) was a British trade union leader.

Born in Blackburn, Bates became a weaver, then won election as secretary of the Skipton and District Weavers' and Winders' Association. In 1913, he was instead appointed as secretary of the larger Blackburn and District Weavers', Winders' and Warpers' Association. In 1919, he additionally became secretary of the Northern Counties Textile Trades Federation. Through these roles, he took part in all the main labour negotiations in the cotton industry. He was known for his diplomacy, and his wideranging knowledge of the industry.

Bates joined the Labour Party, for which he was elected to Blackburn Town Council. From 1929 to 1931, he served as the first Labour Party Mayor of Blackburn. He also became a magistrate.

Bates died early in 1943, still holding his trade union posts, and also served as an alderman in Blackburn.

Trade union offices
Preceded by Ernest Holden	General Secretary of the Blackburn Weavers' Association; 1919–1943	Succeeded by G. Bannister
Preceded by Tom Shaw	General Secretary of the Northern Counties Textile Trades Federation; 1919–1943	Succeeded by Andrew Naesmith
Civic offices
Preceded by John Ormerod	Mayor of Blackburn; 1929–1931	Succeeded by William Kenyon
