= Jack Brown (trade unionist) =

British trade union leader (1929–1991)

Jack Brown MBE (10 November 1929 – 4 September 1991) was a British trade union leader.

Born in Leigh, Greater Manchester, Brown was educated at Pennington School and Leigh Secondary Modern School. On leaving school, he worked in a cotton mill in Bolton, and joined the Bolton and District Card, Blowing and Ring Room Operatives' Provincial Association. In 1961, he was elected as general secretary of the union.

The union was affiliated with the National Union of Textile and Allied Workers (NUTAW), and in 1973, Brown was elected as its assistant general secretary. The following year, NUTAW became part of the new Amalgamated Textile Workers' Union (ATWU), with Brown continuing as assistant general secretary until 1976, when he won the top job of general secretary.

As leader of the union, Brown focused on obtaining changes in the law so that workers with byssinosis or occupational deafness would be entitled to compensation.

The textile industry was in a long-term decline during Brown's period of activity, and in 1985, he agreed to the merger of the ATWU into the GMB union, and he became the secretary of the union's new textile division. He retired in April 1987. In 1985, Brown was made a Member of the Order of the British Empire.

Trade union offices
| Preceded by Fred Hague | General Secretary of the Amalgamated Textile Workers' Union; 1976–1985 | Union dissolved |
| New post | Secretary of the Textile Division of the GMB; 1985–1987 | Succeeded by Bob Trotter |
