= Amalgamated Textile Warehousemen's Association =

Former trade union of the United Kingdom

- Founded: 1894
- Dissolved: 1986
- Headquarters: Bury, Lancashire
- Location: United Kingdom
- Members: 11,000 (1921)
- Affiliations: GFTU, NCTTF, TUC

The Amalgamated Textile Warehousemen's Association was a trade union representing workers in the textile industry in the United Kingdom, principally in Lancashire.

The union was founded in 1894 as the Amalgamated Society of Clothlookers and Warehousemen, and initially had just 203 members across five autonomous branches. These branches were in Blackburn, Burnley, Bury, Colne and Nelson, Great Harwood and Padiham. Early in the 1900s, these branches established greater co-ordination and the organisation was renamed the General Amalgamation of Clothlookers and Warehousemen. New district associations were established in other towns in Lancashire and Cheshire on the initiative of the amalgamation, and by 1910 it had 21 branches with 2,790 members.

Union	Founded	Affiliated	Notes
Accrington	1906	1906	Dissolved 1950s
Ashton	1901	1901	Dissolved 1960s
Bacup	1906	1906	Merged into Rochdale
Blackburn	1894	1895	Dissolved 1976
Bolton	1906	1906	
Burnley	1890s	1895	
Bury	1890s	1895	
Chorley	1907	1907	Dissolved 1978
Clitheroe	?	?	Dissolved about 1970
Colne	1903	1903	
Colne & Nelson	1891	1895	Split into Colne and Nelson in 1903
Darwen	1919	1919	Dissolved about 1970
Farnworth & Hyde	1900	1900	Merged into Bolton 1907
Great Harwood	1894	1895	Merged into Blackburn 1940s
Haslingden	1907	1907	Dissolved 1970s
Horwich	?	?	Dissolved about 1960
Hyde	1900	1900	
Macclesfield	1910	1910	Dissolved 1910s
Manchester & Salford	1920	1920	Merged into Bury 1950s
Nelson	1903	1903	
Oldham	1907	1907	Dissolved 1970s
Padiham	1890s	1895	
Preston	1906	1906	Dissolved 1970s
Rawtenstall	1919	1919	Dissolved 1930s
Rochdale	1902	1902	Dissolved 1970s

In 1913, the association took its best-known name, the "Amalgamated Textile Warehousemen's Association", and membership rose rapidly, to a peak of 11,000 in 1921. By the 1970s, it was losing members rapidly due to redundancies in the industry. It changed its name again to the Amalgamated Textile Warehouse Operatives Association, and developed strong links with the Amalgamated Textile Workers Union, the two sharing a general secretary.

Most of the association's branches amalgamated or left the association in the early 1980s. The Amalgamated Textile Workers' Union itself merged into the General, Municipal, Boilermakers and Allied Trades Union (GMBATU) in 1985, and the Warehouse Operatives was dissolved the following year. Two remaining affiliates, in Bolton and Hyde, then merged into GMBATU, while Colne merged into GMBATU only in 1990, Nelson dissolved in 1991, and Padiham continued in existence.

== General Secretaries ==
1896: W. Riley
1900s: Edward Strong
1926: John Lee
1950: Thomas Ashe
1971: Frank Walker
1972: A. Birtwistle
1970s: Jack Brown
