= Joseph Cross (trade unionist) =

British trade unionist

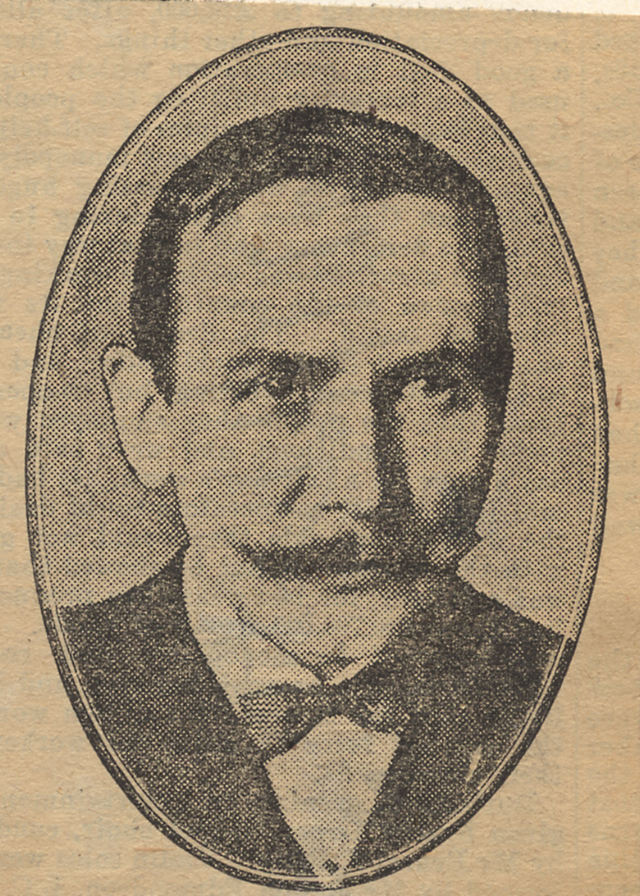
Joseph Cross

Joseph Cross JP (1859–1925) was a British trade unionist.

Cross worked as a weaver, based in Darwen in Lancashire. He began to take an interest in trade union matters and joined the Blackburn and District Weavers' Association. He was elected vice-president of the Society and later president and trustee. During the time he served on the committee he was instrumental in promoting a system of mill representatives. It was around this time that Cross and a few more enthusiasts succeeded in forming the Blackburn and District Trades and Labour Council, which he chaired for seven years. In 1892, he was appointed secretary of the Darwen Weavers' Association, and two years later became secretary of the Blackburn Weavers' Association.

In 1902, Cross was also elected as secretary of the United Textile Factory Workers' Association, a federation of most cotton workers' unions which focused on political matters; he held the post until his death. In September 1905, he accepted the position of Labour correspondent on the Board of Trade for the Blackburn Division of East Lancashire.

The local weavers' associations were members of the Amalgamated Weavers' Association, and Cross was elected as its general secretary in March 1906. On receiving this appointment, Cross resigned from his position on the Trades Council. Efforts were made to induce him to continue in the office, but to no effect. Under his leadership, membership of the association rose from 88,000 to peak at 224,000 in 1921. He also oversaw the reduction of the working week from 52.5 to 48 hours for weavers. In May 1912 he was appointed to represent the textile trade unions upon the Advisory Committee for England under the National Insurance Act.

A Liberal in his younger days, Cross remained a staunch Free Trader and in 1905 shared a Free Trade platform, under the auspices of the Blackburn branch of the Free Trade League, along with Lord George Hamilton and Conservative MP Harry Hornby. At the time the Conservative Party was committed nationally to Tariff reform, a policy to which the cotton industry was opposed. In a speech at the event, Cross summed up Protectionism in the phrase "Open your mouth, shut your eyes and see what Protection will send you". He concluded his appeal to the audience with the counsel "Don't be fooled". Cross remained active in local politics and regularly campaigned in support of greater Labour representation on the Blackburn Council.

It was common knowledge locally that Cross would have been welcomed as a Parliamentary candidate, but his ambition was not in that direction. When the Labour Party first contested the nearby town of Clitheroe in 1902, the name of Cross was mentioned along with that of David Shackleton, who eventually won the seat with Cross as his election agent. Other constituencies attempted to woo him, but Cross would not stand.

The high regard in which Cross was held in the Labour movement was evident at his funeral. Several of the mills in the local area stopped earlier than usual, so that operatives could be provided with an opportunity to witness the obsequies of their leader. All the blinds were drawn in a mark of respect. The majority of operatives' associations in Lancashire sent representatives and Sir David Shackleton was also present. In the gathering at the Co-Operative Hall following the interment, former Home Secretary Arthur Henderson provided the eulogy, describing Cross as 'a man who could not be bought'.

Trade union offices
Preceded by Entwistle Entwistle	General Secretary of the Darwen Weavers' Association; 1892–1894	Succeeded by David Shackleton
Preceded by George Barker	General Secretary of the Blackburn Weavers' Association; 1894–1906	Succeeded by D. Gouldsborough
Preceded by James Mawdsley	General Secretary of the United Textile Factory Workers' Association; 1902–1925	Succeeded by James Bell
Preceded by William Henry Wilkinson	General Secretary of the Amalgamated Weavers' Association; 1906–1925	Succeeded by John C. Parker
Preceded by James O'Grady	Chairman of the General Federation of Trade Unions; 1918–1920	Succeeded by Thomas Mallalieu
