= William Henry Carr =

British trade unionist and political activist (1855–1953)

William Henry Carr (1855 – 27 October 1953) was a British trade unionist and political activist.

Born in the East End of London, Carr grew up in Bacup where he began working in a mill at the age of eleven. He then moved to work as a grinder at a mill in Stalybridge, and became involved in trade unionism.

In 1888, Carr was elected as the secretary of the South East Lancashire Provincial Card and Blowing Room Operatives' Association. He was also appointed as a magistrate for Ashton-under-Lyne, and was active in the Labour Party. His union, the Cardroom Amalgamation of which it formed a part, and the United Textile Factory Workers' Association (UTFWA), which brought together most unions in the industry, all supported his candidacy in Stalybridge for the January 1910 general election, but this was ultimately abandoned due to a lack of local support. Instead, he was adopted as a candidate in Preston at the December 1910 general election. He took 7,855 votes and last place, although this was 23% of the votes cast in a close four-way contest.

Carr was re-adopted as Labour's Prospective Parliamentary Candidate for Preston following the election, but the UTFWA withdrew its support in 1913, leading the Cardroom Amalgamation to leave in protest. Carr felt that his position was untenable and resigned his candidature. Carr was instead considered for selection in Accrington at the election expected in 1914 or 1915, but with the outbreak of World War I, the election was postponed and he ultimately did not stand for Parliament again.

In 1926, Carr stood to become president of the Cardroom Amalgamation, but he was defeated by Joseph Frayne, 35 votes to 34 in the final round of voting. Carr retired as union secretary in 1932, and his wife died the following year. He lived a further twenty years, dying aged 98.

Trade union offices
Preceded by John White	General Secretary of the South East Lancashire Provincial Card and Blowing Room Operatives' Association; 1887–1939	Succeeded by T. Yates
