= Joseph Frayne =

British trade union leader (1882–1942)

Joseph Frayne MBE
- Born: 26 February 1882; Reddish, Lancashire, England
- Died: 11 December 1942 (aged 60); Manchester, England
- Occupation: trade union leader

Joseph Dominic Frayne MBE (26 February 1882 – 11 December 1942) was a British trade union leader, who served as President of the Cardroom Amalgamation and Chair of the General Federation of Trade Unions.

Frayne was born in Reddish and worked for several years as a stripper-and-grinder in a cotton mill in Stockport. He was active in the Stockport Card, Blowing and Ring Room Operatives' Association, and in about 1916, he was appointed as full-time secretary of the union. The union was affiliated to the Cardroom Amalgamation (CWA), and Frayne was accordingly appointed to its executive committee. He was held in high esteem by the members of the CWA and, despite Stockport being one of its smaller affiliates, he was elected as President of the Amalgamation in 1926, defeating Archie Robertson, and then W. H. Carr by 35 votes to 34 in the final round of voting.

In 1932, Frayne's two sons, aged eight and five, drowned in a pond in Reddish, the older boy while trying to save the younger.

Frayne stood down as president of the CWA in 1936 to serve a two-year term as chair of the General Federation of Trade Unions. The following year, he was made a Member of the Order of the British Empire.

He died in Manchester.

Trade union offices
Preceded by F. Parker	General Secretary of the Stockport Card, Blowing and Ring Room Operatives' Association; 1916–1944	Succeeded by David Arthur Mainds
Preceded by James Crinion	President of the Cardroom Amalgamation; 1926–1936	Succeeded by Archie Robertson
Preceded by William Saxon	Chair of the General Federation of Trade Unions; 1936–1938	Succeeded by Andrew Naesmith
