= Ashton-under-Lyne and District Power-Loom Weavers' Association =

Trade union of the Weavers of Asthon-under-Lyne

Ashton Weavers' Association
- Ashton-under-Lyne and District Power-Loom Weavers' Association
- Merged into: South East Lancashire and Cheshire Weavers' and Winders' Association
- Founded: 1877
- Dissolved: 1972
- Headquarters: Weavers' Institute, Old Street, Ashton-under-Lyne
- Location: England
- Members: 7,766 (1913)
- Key people: Lewis Wright (Gen Sec)
- Parent organization: Amalgamated Weavers' Association

The Ashton-under-Lyne and District Power Loom Weavers' Association was a trade union representing cotton weavers in the Ashton-under-Lyne area of Lancashire, in England.

After a dispute at Wellington Mills in Ashton, in 1877, local weavers decided to form a union, establishing it in 1877. One of the largest cotton unions of the 19th-century, it had 6,000 members in seven branches by the 1890s. The union was also a founder member of the Amalgamated Weavers' Association (AWA), in 1884.

Membership of the union peaked at 7,766 in 1913, but fell a little in the 1920s. While it continued to decline, along with the Lancashire cotton industry in general, its secretary Lewis Wright came to prominence as leader of the AWA, and he was later knighted. The union received a small boost in 1951, when the Manchester, Salford and District Weavers' Association merged in.

In 1972, the union merged with the Hyde and District Weavers', Winders', Warpers' and Doublers' Association and the Stockport and District Weavers', Winders', Warpers' and Reelers' Association, forming the South East Lancashire and Cheshire Weavers' and Winders' Association.

== General secretaries ==
1877: William Booth
1907: Sam T. Goggins
1935: Lewis Wright
1953: Fred Hague
