= Bolton and District Weavers', Winders' and Warpers' Association =

Former trade union of the United Kingdom

Bolton Weavers' Association
- Bolton and District Weavers', Winders' and Warpers' Association
- Merged into: North West Lancashire, Durham and Cumbria Textile Workers' Union
- Founded: 1865
- Dissolved: 1982
- Headquarters: 77 St George's Road, Bolton
- Location: England
- Members: 13,500 (1920)
- Parent organization: Amalgamated Weavers' Association (1884–1885; 1892–1974); Amalgamated Textile Workers' Union (1974–1982)

The Bolton and District Weavers', Winders' and Warpers' Association was a trade union representing cotton mill workers in the Bolton area of Lancashire in England. The union was the first in the Lancashire cotton industry to appoint a woman as its full-time leader.

The union was founded in 1865 as the Excelsior Friendly Society of Toilet and Marseilles Quilt Weavers by Power, with the aim of regulating who was able to start working in the industry. In 1878, it became the Bolton Power Loom Weavers' Association. In 1902 it became the Bolton and District Weavers', Winders' and Warpers' Association, and eventually it became the Bolton and District Weavers', Winders', Warpers' and Loom-Sweepers' Association.

In 1884, the union was a founder member of the Amalgamated Weavers' Association, but it left in 1885, and did not rejoin until 1892. In 1888, it was able to appoint its first full-time general secretary, William Melling, who was succeeded by Cephas Speak. Alice Foley began doing the job of assistant secretary in 1917, but was refused the job title, instead becoming "woman officer". She eventually succeeded Speak in 1948, becoming the first woman to become the full-time secretary of a cotton industry trade union. Foley was, in turn, succeeded by another prominent woman, Hilda Unsworth.

In 1982, the union merged with the Bolton and District Union of Textile and Allied Workers, the North Lancashire and Cumbria Textile Workers' Association and the Wigan, Chorley and Skelmersdale District of the Amalgamated Textile Workers' Union, forming the North West Lancashire, Durham and Cumbria Textile Workers' Union.

== General Secretaries ==
1884: William Melling
1910: Cephas Speak
1948: Alice Foley
1961: Hilda Unsworth
1978:
