= John C. Parker =

British trade unionist

John Charles Parker (4 January 1864 – 5 November 1927) was a British trade unionist.

Born in Clayton-le-Moors, Parker became a weaver and was elected as secretary of the Clayton Weavers' Association. This was part of the Amalgamated Weavers' Association (AWA), and Parker was elected as assistant secretary of the AWA. In 1925, the general secretary, Joseph Cross, died suddenly, and in March, Parker won an election to succeed him. However, he also died unexpectedly, a little over two years later.

Trade union offices
Preceded by Joseph Cross	General Secretary of the Amalgamated Weavers' Association; 1925 – 1927	Succeeded by Andrew Naesmith
