= Jim Browning (trade unionist) =

British trade union leader

James Browning (died January 1983) was a British trade union leader.

Browning began working in a textile mill in 1930, based in the mule spinning department. During World War II, he served in the Royal Navy, then in 1946 he returned to his old job.

Back in the mill, Browning became increasingly active in his trade union, the Oldham Provincial Card and Blowing Room and Ring Frame Operatives' Association. In 1952 he was elected as the union's assistant secretary, and he succeeded as its general secretary the following year. The union was affiliated to the Cardroom Amalgamation, and Browning was elected as its president in 1964, also becoming president of the United Textile Factory Workers' Association.

In 1974, the Cardroom Amalgamation became part of the new Amalgamated Textile Workers' Union, and Browning was elected as its first president. He also served on the management committee of the General Federation of Trade Unions, including a year as its chair.

Browning retired from his trade union posts in 1976, becoming part-time chair of the Oldham Area Health Authority.

Trade union offices
Preceded by Archie Robertson	General Secretary of the Oldham Cardroom Association; 1953–1976	Succeeded by ?
Preceded by Harold Chorlton	President of the Cardroom Amalgamation; 1964–1972	Succeeded by Roy Bennett
Preceded by Harold Chorlton	President of the United Textile Factory Workers' Association; 1963–1975	Organisation dissolved
Preceded by Fred Hague	Chairman of the General Federation of Trade Unions; 1970	Succeeded by Arthur Howcroft
New post	President of the Amalgamated Textile Workers' Union; 1974–1976	Succeeded by Joe Quinn
