= Steaming process in Lancashire cotton mills =

Manufacturing process

Steaming or artificial humidity was the process of injecting steam from boilers into cotton weaving sheds in Lancashire, England, in the late 19th and early 20th centuries. The intention was to prevent breakages in short-staple Indian Surat cotton which was introduced in 1862 during a blockade of American cotton at the time of the American Civil War. There was considerable concern about the health implications of steaming. Found to cause ill health, this practice became the subject of much campaigning and investigation from the 1880s to the 1920s. A number of acts of Parliament imposed modifications.

== Background ==
Warp yarns were strengthened by the addition of size – a substance made from flour and tallow or china clay. High humidity was required to weave sized yarn and to minimise the size dust in the air. This was especially important when cloth companies were forced to use Indian Surat cotton instead of Sea Island cotton from South Carolina in 1862 during the American Civil War. The war occurred at a time of market collapse, and the resulting cotton famine caused speculation and restructuring. American cotton was then subject to a blockade, and although some long staple cotton was grown along the Nile (being called Egyptian cotton), short staple Surat was introduced into the mix in most Lancashire mills. This was far harder to weave; the weavers, who were paid by the piece, at first gladly accepted the artificially induced humidity.

Humidity was frequently achieved by injecting steam through pipes into the weaving sheds. The resulting damp conditions caused health risks and considerable discomfort to cotton workers, especially in sheds with poor ventilation. The water was recycled, creating favourable conditions for the propagation of contagious diseases and the accumulation of toxic substances in dyes. Robert Koch discovered the tubercule bacillus in 1882, though the way in which the bacillus was transmitted was not yet understood, allowing the potential question that steaming might be associated with the transmission of tuberculosis.

=== Cotton Cloth Factories Act 1889 ===
The 1887 Annual Report of the Medical Officer of Health for Blackburn, a Dr. Stephenson, referred to the "abominable system of saturating the atmosphere of workshops by means of steam", a practice which he believed led to "the wholesale slaughtering of the inhabitants". During 1889, the Amalgamated Weavers' Association, founded in 1884, campaigned with the Northern Counties Factory Act Reform Association against the practice of steaming. Later that year, the Cotton Cloth Factories Act 1889 (52 & 53 Vict. c. 62) was passed, requiring cotton employers to take regular hygrometer readings and to ensure that a minimum of 600 cubic feet (17 m^{3}) of fresh air per person per hour was allowed into the weaving sheds during steaming. These stipulations, however, were not sufficient to satisfy the weavers, who still hoped for steaming to be abolished. In May 1895, over 200 weavers from two mills in Padiham went on strike against steaming in their mills. The Amalgamated Weavers' Association found that the practice of steaming was increasing during the 1890s, especially in Burnley and Padiham.

In 1892, a Royal Commission on Labour found that there had been very few prosecutions under the Cotton Cloth Factories Act 1889. The workings of the Cotton Cloth Factories Act 1889 were investigated some years later by a government committee chaired by Sir Henry Enfield Roscoe. Roscoe's report of 1897 recommended increasing the infusion of fresh air to 2,000 cubic feet (57 m^{3}) per hour and raised concerns about the purity of water used for steaming. Working conditions did not appear to have greatly improved, as the report also referred to a claim by cotton workers that they were being "stewed alive by Act of Parliament".

=== Factory and Workshop Act 1901 ===
Four years after Roscoe's report, the Factory and Workshop Act 1901 (1 Edw. 7. c. 22) obliged cotton employers to ensure that water for steaming came from a pure source or was suitably purified. This act also stipulated that artificial humidity (steaming) should cease when the wet bulb (Note: The typical accurate hygrometer of the day was the 'wet and dry bulb' psychrometer. This uses two thermometers, one with its bulb in open air and the other with it wrapped in a thin cloth, kept damp. The wet-bulb temperature is always lower, owing to evaporation of the water, and comparing the two readings against a chart gives a measure of the air's humidity.) of the hygrometer exceeded 75%. Two hygrometers were to be provided in each humid shed, with further hygrometers where more than 700 looms were present.

=== Factory and Workshop (Cotton Cloth Factories) Act 1911 ===
In 1906 when the Amalgamated Weavers' Association balloted its members on steaming, a vast majority were in favour of its abolition. A further Government enquiry resulted, chaired by Sir Hamilton Freer-Smith. In 1909, Freer-Smith's report: Departmental Committee on Humidity and Ventilation in Cotton Weaving Sheds, was published. The committee had included cotton mill employers and Trade Union representatives; the two sides disagreed on an upper level of humidity. Employers wanted a 75% "wet bulb" limit, whereas union members, who would have preferred abolition, sought a compromise of 70%. The subsequent Factory and Workshop (Cotton Cloth Factories) Act 1911 (1 & 2 Geo. 5. c. 21), however, specified a wet bulb limit of 75%.

=== Factory and Workshop (Cotton Cloth Factories) Act 1929 ===
The controversy continued until the late 1920s. The 1928 Home Office Report of the Departmental Committee on Artificial Humidity in Cotton Cloth Factories by J. Jackson recommended that, for comfort, steaming should cease when the hygrometer wet bulb reached 72.5%. This became law under the Factory and Workshop (Cotton Cloth Factories) Act 1929 (19 & 20 Geo. 5. c. 15). Despite previous beliefs, the report concluded that there was no evidence that humid sheds caused more harm to health than dry sheds and that to abolish steaming would hinder trade by increasing manufacturing costs.

== See also ==
- Kissing the shuttle
- Mule spinners' cancer

== Notes ==
=== Bibliography ===
- Farnie, D.A. (1979), The English Cotton Industry and the World Market 1815–1896, Clarendon Press, ISBN 0-19-822478-8
- Fowler, Alan (2003). Lancashire Cotton Operatives and Work,1900–1950: A social history of Lancashire cotton operatives in the twentieth century. Aldershot: Ashgate Publishing Ltd. ISBN 0-7546-01161.
- Greenlees, Janet (2005). "'Stop Kissing and Steaming!': Tuberculosis and the Occupational Health Movement in the Massachusetts and Lancashire Cotton Weaving Industries, 1870–1918". Urban History. 32 (2): 223–246. doi:10.1017/S0963926805002981. PMC 3087970. PMID 21552481.
- Hopwood, Edwin (1969). A History of the Lancashire Cotton Industry and the Amalgamated Weavers' Association. Manchester: The Amalgamated Weavers' Association.

== Additional sources ==
- The National Archives (United Kingdom): Cotton Cloth Factories Act 1889 Retrieved 6 June 2014
- "The Factory and Workshop Act, 1901". Br Med J. 2 (2139): 1871–2. 1901. doi:10.1136/bmj.2.2139.1871. PMC 2507680. PMID 20759953.
- The National Archives (United Kingdom): Cotton Cloth Factories Act 1911 Retrieved 6 June 2014
- Google Books: Wharton's Concise Dictionary by Ar Lakshmanan and John Jane Smith Wharton Cotton Cloth Factories Act 1929 Retrieved 6 June 2014
- Google Books: Departmental Committee on Humidity and Ventilation in Cotton Weaving Sheds by Sir Hamilton Freer-Smith (H.M. Stationery Office, 1909) Retrieved 6 June 2014
