= Accrington and District Weavers', Winders' and Warpers' Friendly Association =

Trade union

Accrington Weavers' Association
- Accrington and District Weavers', Winders' and Warpers' Friendly Association
- Merged into: Northern Textile and Allied Workers' Union
- Founded: 1858
- Dissolved: 1981
- Headquarters: Weavers' Office, Wellington Street, Accrington
- Members: 4,500 (1910)

The Accrington and District Weavers', Winders' and Warpers' Friendly Association was a trade union representing cotton weavers in the Accrington area of Lancashire, in England.

The union stated that it was founded in 1858, although the Board of Trade claimed that it had been founded in 1856. It was originally named the Accrington Power Loom Weavers' Association, and worked closely with the Accrington Co-operative Society. Its founders, Richard Lord, James Parkinson and Thomas Parkinson had previously worked in Settle.

By 1863, the union had 550 members, and it affiliated to the East Lancashire Amalgamated Weavers' Friendly Association. It undertook a major strike in 1878, but was defeated after nine weeks, and lost most of its membership. However, the union survived, and by 1884 it had rebuilt its strength, for the first time employing a full-time general secretary. That year, it became a founder member of the Amalgamated Weavers' Association.

Membership of the union continued to grow, reaching 4,500 in 1910, the large majority of whom were women. In 1930, it simplified its name by removing the word "Friendly". It began losing members, as the Lancashire cotton industry declined, and in 1949 the Church and Oswaldtwistle Weavers', Winders' and Warpers' Association joined it, forming the Accrington, Church and Oswaldtwistle Weavers', Winders' and Warpers' Association. It survived until 1981, when it merged into the Northern Textile and Allied Workers' Union.

== General Secretaries ==
1884: Henry Heap
1908: J. R. Emmett
1937: F. Coleman
1940s: William Ridehalgh
1950s: W. Smith
1960s: P. G. Walker
