= Burnley, Nelson, Rossendale and District Textile Workers' Union =

Former trade union of the United Kingdom

- Predecessor: Burnley Weavers' Association; Nelson Weavers' Association
- Merged into: Transport and General Workers' Union
- Founded: 1966
- Dissolved: 1984
- Headquarters: 33 Carr Road, Nelson, Lancashire
- Location: England
- Key people: Albert Shaw (gen sec)
- Parent organization: Amalgamated Weavers' Association (until 1974); Amalgamated Textile Workers' Union (1974 to 1983)

The Burnley, Nelson, Rossendale and District Textile Workers' Union (BNRDTWU) was a trade union representing cotton industry workers in the Burnley and Nelson areas of Lancashire in England.

The union was formed in 1966 with the merger of the Burnley and District Weavers', Winders' and Beamers' Association and the Nelson and District Weavers' Association, initially as the Burnley, Nelson and District Textile Workers' Union. The Padiham and District Weavers', Winders' and Warpers' Association and the Rossendale Valley Textile Workers' Association joined in 1977, and the union adopted its final name.

The union was initially affiliated to the Amalgamated Weavers' Association, then from 1974 to its successor, the Amalgamated Textile Workers' Union (ATWU). In 1983, it decided to leave the ATWU, and argued that as its largest affiliate, it should be entitled to a proportionate share of the union's funds. The ATWU disagreed, and the dispute went to the High Court of England and Wales, which rejected the Burnley and Nelson union's claim.

In 1984, with membership down to only 1,600, the union merged into the Transport and General Workers Union.
