= James Bell (trade unionist) =

British trade unionist & politician (1872-1955)

Member of Parliament for Ormskirk
- In office 14 December 1918 – October 1922
- Preceded by: Arthur Stanley
- Succeeded by: Francis Blundell

Personal details
- Born: 27 August 1872 Darlington, County Durham
- Died: 27 December 1955 (aged 83) Oldham, Lancashire
- Party: Labour
- Spouse: Elizabeth Hannah Heaton (m. 1895)
- Children: At least 6

James Bell (27 August 1872 – 27 December 1955) was a British trade unionist and Labour Party politician who represented Ormskirk from 1918–22. He was described by a fellow union official as "one of the shrewdest negotiators the trade unions in the cotton industry had ever had."

== Biography ==
Bell was born in Darlington, County Durham, the son of John Bell, a coalminer, and his wife, Margaret (née Guy). At age 13, he began working as a cotton weaver at a factory in Haworth, Yorkshire, then moved with his father and brothers to Nelson, Lancashire to work in one of the town's mills. He became involved in trade union activities, leading to his sacking on three occasions. He subsequently moved to the town of Oldham, becoming secretary of the Oldham district of the Amalgamated Weavers' Association in 1905, the first of many posts he held with the organisation over the next 41 years, including vice-president (1930–37) and president (1937–45).

He was the first president of the Oldham Labour Party, and attempted to gain election to the Borough Council without success. In 1918, he was elected as member of parliament for Ormskirk, the first non-Conservative to be elected for this seat since its creation in 1885. This was principally due to a divided Conservative vote between the Coalition Conservatives and the candidate of the National Farmers Union. Bell served only one term in parliament, losing his seat at the next election in 1922.

After leaving parliament, Bell continued his union activities. In 1924, he was appointed secretary of the International Federation of Textile Workers' Associations, and from 1925 to 1931 was secretary of the United Textile Factory Workers Association—known as "the cotton workers parliament." In 1930, he took part in a trade mission to China. He also served on several government commissions and as a member of the National Arbitration Tribunal.

== Personal life and death ==
In 1895, Bell married Elizabeth Hannah Heaton. They had at least six children, including two sons who were in the Army during the First World War. He later lived in Wythenshawe, Manchester. He died, aged 83, at the Oldham and District General Hospital in December 1955.

Parliament of the United Kingdom
Preceded by Arthur Stanley	Member of Parliament for Ormskirk; 1918 – 1922	Succeeded by Francis Blundell
Trade union offices
Preceded by A. Birtles	Secretary of the Oldham Weavers' Association; 1905–1946	Succeeded by James Milhench
Preceded by Tom Shaw	Secretary of the International Federation of Textile Workers' Associations; 1924–1925	Succeeded by Tom Shaw
Preceded by Joseph Cross	Secretary of the United Textile Factory Workers' Association; 1925–1931	Succeeded by Cephas Speak
Preceded by Ebby Edwards and John Marchbank	Trades Union Congress representative to the American Federation of Labour; 1929; With: James Thomas Brownlie	Succeeded by Allan Findlay and Arthur Shaw
Preceded by James Hindle	President of the Amalgamated Weavers' Association; 1937–1947	Succeeded by Carey Hargreaves
Preceded by James Hindle and William Wood	Cotton Group member of the General Council of the Trades Union Congress; 1937–1945; With: William Wood (1937–1938); Robert C. Handley (1938–1940); Alfred Roberts (1940–1945)	Succeeded by Andrew Naesmith and Alfred Roberts
