= Padiham and District Weavers', Winders' and Warpers' Association =

Former trade union of the United Kingdom

Padiham Weavers' Association
- Padiham and District Weavers', Winders' and Warpers' Association
- Merged into: Burnley, Nelson and District Textile Workers' Union
- Founded: 1856
- Dissolved: 1977
- Headquarters: Weavers' Institute, Sowerby Street, Padiham
- Location: England
- Members: 6,010 (1907)
- Parent organization: Amalgamated Weavers' Association (1884–1974)

The Padiham and District Weavers', Winders' and Warpers' Association was a trade union representing cotton weavers in the Padiham area of Lancashire, in England.

The foundation date of the union is unclear, having been given variously as 1850, 1856 or 1858. It definitely existed by 1858, when it became a founder constituent of the North East Lancashire Amalgamated Weavers' Association. The following year, it led a 29-week strike.

In 1884, the union was a founding constituent of the Amalgamated Weavers' Association. Membership of the union was over 4,000 by 1892, and peaked at just under 6,010 in 1907. Unlike many other cotton industry unions, in 1915 it voted against funding the Labour Party. It then decided to register with the government, but almost immediately changed its mind, and deregistered.

Union membership declined along with employment in the Lancashire cotton industry, and by 1960 the union had only 900 members remaining. It remained independent until 1977, when it merged into the Burnley, Nelson and District Textile Workers' Union.

== General Secretaries ==
1850s: Abraham Pinder
Robert Hargreaves
1910s: Thomas Y. Sutcliffe
1916: David Russell
1944: T. Taylor
1960: J. Mannion
