= Blackburn and District Weavers', Winders' and Warpers' Association =

Trade union representing cotton industry workers

Blackburn Weavers' Association
- Blackburn and District Weavers', Winders' and Warpers' Association
- Merged into: GMB
- Founded: 1854
- Dissolved: 1986
- Headquarters: 1 Clayton Street, Blackburn
- Location: England
- Members: 20,000 (1920)
- Parent organization: Amalgamated Weavers' Association (1884–1974); Amalgamated Textile Workers' Union (1974–1985)

The Blackburn and District Weavers' Winders' and Warpers' Association was a trade union representing cotton industry workers in Blackburn, Lancashire, in England. One of the earliest weavers' unions to endure, it formed a model that many others copied, and was at the centre of early attempts to form a regional federation of cotton trade unions.

The union was founded in 1854, as the Blackburn Weavers' Friendly Society. While some previous unions of weavers had been formed, only the small Radcliffe Weavers' Society proved enduring, and it was the model of the Blackburn union which was copied in other Lancashire towns. As the pre-eminent weavers' union, in 1856 it formed the Power Loom Weavers' Association of Lancashire, Cheshire, Yorkshire and Derbyshire, soon less ambitiously renamed as the Power Loom Weavers' Association of North and South Lancashire. The federation soon suffered from disputes, with most other affiliates leaving in 1858 to form the North East Lancashire Amalgamated Weavers' Association. This "First Amalgamation" proved far more successful, but Blackburn refused to join. However, in 1884 it did become a founding member of the new Amalgamated Weavers' Association (AWA).

In 1885, one branch of the union split away, forming the rival Blackburn Power Loom Weavers' Protection Society. This remained significantly smaller than the original union, which grew to 12,500 members by 1900, and peaked 20,000 by 1920, before a long decline in the industry. The Protection Society became associated with the Conservative Party, but finally rejoined in 1949, while in 1960 the neighbouring Darwen Weavers', Winders' and Warpers' Association merged in.

In 1901, the union was involved in a dispute which led it to picket workplaces. Encouraged by the Taff Vale decision against a trade union which had gone on strike, employers took action against the union which ended up costing it £11,000. This led the union, through the United Textile Workers' Factory Association, to shift its support to the new Labour Representation Committee, forerunner of the Labour Party.

The union survived until 1986, when declining membership led it to merge into the GMB.

== General Secretaries ==
1854: Ned Whittle
1858: John Whalley
1880: George Barker
1894: Joseph Cross
1906: D. Gouldsborough
1909: W. A. Duckworth
1912: Ernest Holden
1913: Luke Bates
1943: G. Bannister
1946: Fred Hague
1951: John Casson
1960s: William Rutter
as of 1982: L. Sharples
