= Andrew Naesmith =

British trade union leader (1888-1961)

Sir Andrew Naesmith CBE (24 July 1888 – 23 October 1961) was a British trade union leader.

Born in Bonnyrigg in Midlothian, Naesmith grew up in Lancashire, where he worked in a cotton mill, initially as a half-timer. He served with the Black Watch during World War I as a quartermaster-sergeant.

Naesmith joined his local weavers' union at the age of fifteen, and rose rapidly to become general secretary of the Amalgamated Weavers' Association in 1927. He was also elected to the General Council of the Trades Union Congress (TUC), and served as the TUC's representative to the American Federation of Labour in 1935.

As a result of his position in the trade union movement, Naesmith was appointed to the Cotton Board, then in 1947 to the government's Economic Planning Board. He resigned in 1949 due to work pressures, but instead accepted appointment as a Governor of the Bank of England. Staff of the Bank objected to his appointment, holding that a trade union post among the governors should be held by someone from one of their own unions, but he was nonetheless reappointed in 1953, when he was also appointed to the Iron and Steel Board, and stood down from his union posts.

Naesmith was awarded the CBE in the 1942 Birthday Honours, then was knighted in the 1953 Coronation Honours.

Trade union offices
Preceded by John C. Parker	General Secretary of the Amalgamated Weavers' Association; 1927–1953	Succeeded by Lewis Wright
Preceded by Luke Bates	General Secretary of the Northern Counties Textile Trades Federation; 1943–1953	Succeeded by Lewis Wright
Preceded by John Stokes and Alexander Walkden	Trades Union Congress representative to the American Federation of Labour; 1935; With: Andrew Conley	Succeeded by George Gibson and William Kean
Preceded by Joseph Frayne	President of the General Federation of Trade Unions; 1938 – 1940	Succeeded by John Lee
Preceded by James Bell and Alfred Roberts	Cotton Group member of the General Council of the Trades Union Congress; 1945 – 1953; With: Alfred Roberts	Succeeded by Lewis Wright and Alfred Roberts
