= Harold Chorlton =

British trade union leader and politician

Councillor Harold Chorlton

Mayor of Rochdale
- In office 1949–1950
- Preceded by: F. W. Greenwood
- Succeeded by: Abraham Taylor

Councillor for Castleton East
- In office 1935–1967

Personal details
- Born: Harold Chorlton; 14 February 1898 Rochdale, Lancashire
- Died: 4 January 1967 (aged 68) Rochdale, Lancashire
- Occupation: Politician

Harold Chorlton CBE (14 February 1898 – 4 January 1967) was a British trade union leader and politician. He served as the council leader in Rochdale, and also as a leading figure in the Lancashire cotton trade unions.

Born in Rochdale, Lancashire, Chorlton began working at a local cotton mill as a roller coverer, when he was thirteen years old. He subsequently became a stripper-and-grinder, and joined the Rochdale Card and Blowing Room and Ring Spinners' Association.

In 1930, Chorlton was elected as secretary of the Rochdale Cardroom Association. In this role, he led a drive to achieve 100% union membership and, although this was not achieved, he did increase membership density. He also managed to get Sunday morning work abolished He stood unsuccessfully as a Labour Party candidate for Rochdale town council in Castleton East in 1934, but won the seat in 1935, and held it each year thereafter. During this period, his newspapers were delivered by Cyril Smith, who he encouraged to join the party, and who later won election to the council.

Chorlton became deputy leader of Rochdale town council in 1948, and served as Mayor of Rochdale in 1949–1950., He used his mayoral year to visit all the local cotton mills, thanking workers for their efforts during and after World War II. In 1952, he was appointed as an alderman on the council.

In 1953, Chorlton was elected as President of the Cardroom Amalgamation, to which the Rochdale union was affiliated. Five years later, he was additionally elected as President of the United Textile Factory Workers' Association, which represented the cotton unions in political matters. He retired from his trade union posts in 1963, and was made a Commander of the Order of the British Empire in recognition of his union work.

Chorlton became the leader of the Labour Party group on Rochdale council in 1960. In 1966, the council debated rent increases; Chorlton was opposed, but gave the group a free vote on the issue. This prompted the resignation of Cyril Smith and four supporters, who later joined the Liberal Party.

In January 1967, Chorlton said goodbye to a relative on a train at Rochdale railway station. The train began moving off, and he attempted to disembark, but fell and fractured his skull, dying soon afterwards. In his obituary, The Guardian described him as the "father of Rochdale town council".

Chorlton's wife, Alice, also served on Rochdale Council for many years, and was the first woman to become Mayor of Rochdale (1962–1963).

Civic offices
Preceded by F. W. Greenwood	Mayor of Rochdale; 1949–1950	Succeeded by Abraham Taylor
Trade union offices
Preceded by J. J. Kingsley	General Secretary of the Rochdale Cardroom Association; 1930–1963	Succeeded by A. Belfield
Preceded by Archie Robertson	President of the Cardroom Amalgamation; 1953–1963	Succeeded by Jim Browning
Preceded by William Roberts	President of the United Textile Factory Workers' Association; 1958–1963	Succeeded by Jim Browning
