= Carey Hargreaves =

British trade unionist (died 1954)

Carey Hargreaves (died 11 October 1954) was a British trade unionist.

Born in Burnley, Hargreaves grew up in Barrowford. He worked as a cotton weaver and became active in the Nelson Weavers' Association (NWA), serving on its committee for a few years before becoming its assistant general secretary in 1912.

During World War I, Hargreaves served in the British Army, but he returned to Nelson and his trade union activities after the war, and was elected as general secretary of the NWA in 1928. Immediately after his election, the union was involved in a major dispute over fines and the sacking of its vice-president by his employer. Although the union gained little from the dispute, Hargreaves was considered to have handled it well.

Unlike most of the NWA's leadership, Hargreaves was not politically active, and he was sometimes accused of holding back information from his committee.

Hargreaves was elected to the central committee of the Amalgamated Weavers' Association in 1930, and then as its president in 1947. He retired in May 1949, and devoted his remaining years to the Nelson Excelsior Glee Committee, where he indulged his love of music.

Trade union offices
Preceded by James Helm	General Secretary of the Nelson Weavers' Association; 1928 – 1949	Succeeded by James Butterfield
Preceded by James Bell	President of the Amalgamated Weavers' Association; 1947 – 1949	Succeeded by Lewis Wright
