= Northern Textile and Allied Workers' Union =

English trade union

- Merged into: Transport and General Workers' Union
- Founded: 1886
- Dissolved: 1984
- Headquarters: Avenue Parade, Accrington
- Location: England
- Members: 4,000 (1920)
- Parent organization: Cardroom Amalgamation

The Northern Textile and Allied Workers' Union was a trade union representing cotton factory workers in northern Lancashire in England.

The union was founded in 1886 as the Accrington District Card and Blowing Room Operatives' and Ring Spinners' Association. That same year, it was a founding constituent of the Cardroom Amalgamation and, although it was suspended for not paying dues in 1891, it was soon readmitted, with its secretary Anthony Eidsforth assuming a prominent role in the amalgamation.

By 1887, the Accrington Association had attracted members in various nearby towns, and restructured itself as a federal organisation named the North East Lancashire Card and Blowing Room Operatives' and Ring Spinners' Association. In 1891, its affiliates included Accrington, Burnley, Church, Darwen, Haslingden and Oswaldtwistle. These affiliates changed in number repeatedly over the years, and its membership varied from 2,000 in 1892, to 500 in 1904, then to a peak of 4,000 in 1920, before falling back to 1,566 in 1936.

In 1961, the North Lancashire Card, Blowing Room and Ring Spinners' Association merged into the North East Lancashire Association, which renamed itself as the "Northern Textile and Allied Workers' Union".

In 1981 it absorbed the Accrington, Church and Ostwaldtwistle Weavers', Winders' and Warpers', etc., Association. It merged with the Transport and General Workers' Union in 1984.

== General secretaries ==
1891: Anthony Eidsforth
1892: J. T. Shaw
1895: Anthony Eidsforth
c.1910: R. Kay
1933: H. Potts
1941: Jack Greenhalgh
1949: Joe King
1962: James Farrington
