= South East Lancashire Provincial Card and Blowing Room Operatives' Association =

English trade union, 1887–1967

South East Lancashire Cardroom Operatives' Association
- South East Lancashire Provincial Card and Blowing Room Operatives' Association
- Merged into: South East Lancashire and Cheshire Textile Operatives' Association
- Founded: 1887
- Dissolved: 1967
- Headquarters: Old Street, Ashton-under-Lyne
- Location: England
- Members: 7,000 (1920)
- Parent organization: Cardroom Amalgamation

The South East Lancashire Provincial Card and Blowing Room Operatives' Association was a trade union representing cotton industry workers in Ashton-under-Lyne and surrounding areas of Lancashire in England.

In 1865, the United Central Association of Card and Blowing Room Operatives of Great Britain was formed, representing cardroom workers through southern Lancashire. While originally based in Hyde, its headquarters were moved to Ashton, which became its most important branch. However, in 1879, the United Central Association voted to prohibit Irish people from joining the union. The Ashton branch, led by John White, objected to this, and split away. In 1883, White took the branch into the Oldham Cardroom Amalgamation, and with the support of this organisation, he was able to increase membership from fifty to 1,200 by 1886.

White argued that the Oldham Amalgamation was too limited in scope, and that a new, national Cardroom Workers' Amalgamation (CWA) was needed. He won the argument, and the CWA was founded in 1886, but White and other Ashton members failed to win election to any posts on its executive. In protest, the Ashton union withdrew from both amalgamations. Following negotiations, in 1887 it agreed to merge with a much smaller union in Stalybridge to form the "South East Lancashire Provincial Card and Blowing Room Operatives' Association", the new union covering various towns around Ashton. It joined the CWA, and officially registered as a trade union in 1890.

Membership of the union initially grew rapidly, peaking at 3,472 in 1893, then, following a slight decline, hitting 5,500 in 1910, and a new peak of 7,000 in 1920. During this period, it was led by William Henry Carr, who was also prominent in the CWA.

The cotton industry declined through the remainder of the 20th-century, and union membership fell with it. In 1967, the union merged with the Hyde and District Card, Blowing and Ring Frame Operatives' Association and the Stockport Card, Blowing and Ring Room Operatives' Association to form the South East Lancashire and Cheshire Textile Operatives' Association.

== General Secretaries ==
1887: John White
1888: William Henry Carr
1940: T. Yates
c.1960: Roy Bennett
