= Alfred Roberts (trade unionist) =

British trade unionist

Alfred Roberts (30 November 1897 – 18 November 1963) was a British trade unionist.

Roberts was born in Bolton, his father being a coal carter. He studied at the Chalfont Street Council School, but left at thirteen to work in the office of a builders' company, before moving to work in the cotton industry. After a break during World War I, during which he served in the Royal Navy, he became active in the National Association of Card, Blowing and Ring Room Operatives (Cardroom Amalgamation), and by the age of thirty was the union's Preston secretary.

In 1935, Roberts was elected as General Secretary of the Cardroom Amalgamation. In 1948, he was appointed to the Cotton Board, and in 1950/51 he served as President of the Trades Union Congress. He was awarded the CBE, an honorary master's degree by the University of Manchester, and was knighted in 1955. He was a vice-chairman of the International Labour Organization from 1954 until 1960, while, in 1956, he joined the board of directors of the Bank of England.

Roberts retired from his general secretaryship in 1962, but he continued to acquire new positions on committees, including becoming a governor of the Commonwealth Institute and a member of the Nationalised Industries Advisory Committee. However, he died in 1963.

Trade union offices
Preceded by William Thomasson	General Secretary of the Cardroom Amalgamation; 1935–1962	Succeeded by Joe King
Preceded by James Bell and Robert C. Handley	Cotton Group member of the General Council of the Trades Union Congress; 1940 – 1963; With: James Bell (1940 – 1945); Andrew Naesmith (1945 – 1953); Lewis Wright (1953 – 1963)	Succeeded by Lewis Wright
Preceded by Herbert Bullock	President of the Trades Union Congress; 1950/51	Succeeded by Arthur Deakin
Preceded by Jim Kelly and Tom Yates	Trades Union Congress representative to the American Federation of Labour; 1952	Succeeded by Charles Geddes and Edwin Hall
Preceded by Charles Geddes	President of the ICFTU European Regional Organisation; 1957–1963	Succeeded by Frederick Hayday
