= United Textile Factory Workers' Association =

Former trade union of the United Kingdom

- Founded: 1889
- Dissolved: 1975
- Location: United Kingdom
- Members: 100,522 (1946)
- Affiliations: Labour Party

The United Textile Factory Workers' Association (UTFWA) was a trade union federation in Great Britain. It was active from 1889 until 1975.

== Objectives ==
The federation was founded in 1889, to represent the various textile workers' unions in political matters. A successor to the Northern Counties Factory Acts Reform Association, it had a broader outlook, not just campaigning on the implementation and extension of the Factory Acts.

The UTFWA initially represented around 125,000 workers, three-quarters within twenty miles of Bolton in Lancashire. By the early twentieth century, its members were organised in the Amalgamated Association of Card and Blowing Room Operatives, Amalgamated Association of Operative Cotton Spinners, Amalgamated Association of Beamers, Twisters and Drawers, Amalgamated Weavers' Association, General Union of Loom Overlookers and Operative Bleachers, Dyers and Finishers Association. Later members included the Amalgamated Textile Warehousemen, the General Warp Dressers' Association of Lancashire and Yorkshire, and the Ball Warpers' Association.

The new federation had a General Council with about two hundred members of local unions, and a Legislative Council of full-time leaders. However, its member unions did not always engage with its structures, and the General Council did not meet between 1896 and 1899.

== Early years ==
In its early years, the association attempted to introduce a bill reducing working hours, but dropped the proposal after it was only narrowly passed in a ballot of members. It also hoped to sponsor parliamentary candidates for both the Conservative Party and Liberal Party, but decided not to pursue this following a lack of interest from the Conservatives and opposition from James Mawdsley. However, it did achieve some success in campaigning against Indian tariffs on cotton imports, as the rates were reduced to below those on other materials.

In 1902, breaking with its previous policy, the UTFWA supported David Shackleton's candidature for the Labour Representation Committee (LRC) in Clitheroe. He was elected and, the following year, the Association affiliated to the LRC. The Cardroom Workers quit the association a few years later after none of its members were adopted as parliamentary candidates, but rejoined in 1916.

In 1920, some of its member unions moved for the association to extend its remit to industrial matters, but this was not adopted.

== Demise ==
The federation was dissolved on 1 December 1975, following the decline of the industry and the merger of its two largest affiliates into the Amalgamated Textile Workers' Union.

== Election results ==
The federation sponsored a large number of Labour Party candidates, many of whom won election.

Election	Constituency	Candidate	Votes	Percentage	Position	Union
1906 general election	Bolton	Alfred Henry Gill	10,416	37.1	2	Spinners
1906 general election	Clitheroe	David James Shackleton	12,035	75.9	1	Weavers
1910 Jan general election	Bolton	Alfred Gill	11,864	30.5	2	Spinners
1910 Jan general election	Clitheroe	David Shackleton	13,873	67.3	1	Weavers
1910 Dec general election	Bolton	Alfred Gill	7,729	64.0	2	Spinners
1910 Dec general election	Clitheroe	Albert Smith	12,107	67.7	1	Weavers
1910 Dec general election	Preston	William Henry Carr	7,853	23.0	4	Cardroom
1911 by-election	Oldham	William Cornforth Robinson	7,448	24.6	3	Beamers
1918 general election	Clitheroe	Alfred Davies	9,578	44.7	1	Spinners
1918 general election	Fylde	William John Tout	7,400	35.1	2	Weavers
1918 general election	Nelson and Colne	Albert Smith	14,075	62.0	1	Weavers
1918 general election	Oldham	William Cornforth Robinson	15,178	19.6	3	Beamers
1918 general election	Ormskirk	James Bell	6,545	37.2	1	Weavers
1918 general election	Preston	Tom Shaw	19,213	25.8	1	Weavers
1918 general election	Rossendale	Gilbert Wright Jones	7,984	35.1	2	Bleachers
1918 general election	Sowerby	John William Ogden	7,306	32.7	2	Weavers
1920 by-election	Ashton-under-Lyne	William Cornforth Robinson	8,127	39.6	2	Beamers
1922 general election	Birmingham Duddeston	Michael Brothers	8,331	38.9	2	Cardroom
1922 general election	Clitheroe	Alfred Davies	12,911	45.3	2	Spinners
1922 general election	Elland	William C. Robinson	10,590	36.8	1	Beamers
1922 general election	Middleton and Prestwich	Matthew Burrow Farr	10,505	41.5	2	Cardroom
1922 general election	Oldham	William John Tout	24,434	27.7	2	Weavers
1922 general election	Ormskirk	James Bell	8,374	41.3	2	Weavers
1922 general election	Preston	Tom Shaw	26,259	27.9	1	Weavers
1922 general election	Rossendale	Gilbert Wright Jones	11,029	36.5	2	Bleachers
1922 general election	Royton	John B. Battle	5,776	19.6	2	Spinners
1922 general election	Sowerby	John William Ogden	7,496	25.5	3	Weavers
1923 general election	Bolton	Albert Law	25,133	18.6	1	Spinners
1923 general election	Chorley	Zeph Hutchinson	12,179	45.3	2	Weavers
1923 general election	Clitheroe	Alfred Davies	11,469	37.9	2	Spinners
1923 general election	Elland	William C. Robinson	12,031	49.1	2	Beamers
1923 general election	Middleton and Prestwich	Matthew Burrow Farr	7,849	28.7	3	Cardroom
1923 general election	Oldham	William John Tout	20,939	23.4	1	Weavers
1923 general election	Preston	Tom Shaw	25,816	34.4	1	Weavers
1924 general election	Bolton	Albert Law	30,632	20.9	3	Spinners
1924 general election	Chorley	Zeph Hutchinson	13,074	42.3	2	Weavers
1924 general election	Elland	William C. Robinson	11,690	39.5	1	Beamers
1924 general election	Middleton and Prestwich	Matthew Burrow Farr	8,442	27.0	2	Cardroom
1924 general election	Oldham	William Tout	23,623	19.7	3	Weavers
1924 general election	Preston	Tom Shaw	27,009	26.3	1	Weavers
1924 general election	Rossendale	James Bell	9,951	32.4	2	Weavers
1925 by-election	Oldham	William John Tout	21,702	45.2	2	Weavers
1929 general election	Bolton	Albert Law	43,520	24.0	1	Spinners
1929 general election	Bolton	Michael Brothers	37,888	20.9	2	Cardroom
1929 general election	Bury	James Bell	13,175	37.4	2	Weavers
1929 general election	Middleton and Prestwich	Matthew Burrow Farr	14,368	34.6	2	Cardroom
1929 general election	Preston	Tom Shaw	37,705	29.5	1	Weavers
1929 general election	Sowerby	William John Tout	14,223	37.2	1	Weavers
1931 general election	Bolton	Michael Brothers	32,049	16.4	4	Cardroom
1931 general election	Bolton	Albert Law	33,736	17.3	3	Spinners
1931 general election	Bury	James Bell	10,532	29.7	2	Weavers
1931 general election	Heywood and Radcliffe	James Stott	12,915	28.5	2	Beamers
1931 general election	Middleton and Prestwich	Thomas McCall	10,796	25.4	2	Warehousemen
1931 general election	Preston	Tom Shaw	25,710	18.0	3	Weavers
1931 general election	Royton	George Illingworth	5,913	14.4	3	Spinners
1931 general election	Sowerby	William John Tout	11,857	31.7	2	Weavers
1935 general election	Blackburn	James Bell	34,571	23.9	3	Weavers
1935 general election	Bolton	Albert Law	39,890	21.4	3	Spinners
1935 general election	Bolton	John Lynch	39,871	21.4	4	Warehousemen
1935 general election	Middleton and Prestwich	Joseph Nuttall	17,398	38.9	2	Weavers
1935 general election	Oldham	Matthew Burrow Farr	29,647		4	Cardroom
1935 general election	Sowerby	William John Tout	16,035	46.2	2	Weavers
1938 by-election	Farnworth	George Tomlinson	24,298	59.1	1	Weavers
1945 general election	Farnworth	George Tomlinson	28,462	66.1	1	Weavers
1945 general election	Oldham	Frank Fairhurst	31,704	23.9	1	Overlookers
1945 general election	Preston	John William Sunderland	32,889	24.1	2	Weavers
1950 general election	Farnworth	George Tomlinson	25,375	56.6	1	Weavers
1950 general election	Manchester Withington	Lewis Wright	14,206	32.6	2	Weavers
1950 general election	Oldham East	Frank Fairhurst	21,510	45.0	1	Overlookers
1951 general election	Bury and Radcliffe	Lewis Wright	28,058	48.4	2	Weavers
1951 general election	Clitheroe	Harold Bradley	18,582	44.7	2	Weavers
1951 general election	Farnworth	George Tomlinson	26,297	59.2	1	Weavers
1952 by-election	Farnworth	Ernest Thornton	21,834	59.9	1	Weavers
1955 general election	Clitheroe	William Rutter	16,671	43.5	2	Overlookers
1955 general election	Farnworth	Ernest Thornton	24,829	57.7	1	Weavers
1959 general election	Clitheroe	William Rutter	16,103	41.9	2	Overlookers
1959 general election	Farnworth	Ernest Thornton	27,393	58.6	1	Weavers
1964 general election	Farnworth	Ernest Thornton	28,492	62.1	1	Weavers
1966 general election	Farnworth	Ernest Thornton	30,015	66.2	1	Weavers
1970 general election	North Fylde	Raymond Hill	15,235	31.2	2	Weavers

== Leadership ==
=== Secretaries ===
1889: Thomas Birtwistle
c.1892: James Mawdsley
1902: Joseph Cross
1925: James Bell
1931: Cephas Speak
1943: Ernest Thornton
1953: Harold Bradley
1958: James Milhench
1968: Joseph Richardson

=== Presidents ===
1889: David Holmes
1890s: William Mullin
1913: William C. Robinson
1919: Walter Gee
1924: William Thomasson
1935: Archie Robertson
1953: William Roberts
1958: Harold Chorlton
1964: Jim Browning

== See also ==
- History of trade unions in the United Kingdom
