= William Mullin =

British trade unionist

William Mullin (1844 or 1845 – 23 June 1920) was a British trade unionist.

Mullin grew up in Oldham, a town in Greater Manchester, England, and left school at the age of nine to work in a local cotton mill. He joined a local trade union, and was elected as its treasurer in 1880. Most cardroom workers in the town were not unionised and were locked out and lost their wages following the Oldham weavers' strike of 1885. Many of these workers formed a new union, the Amalgamated Association of Card and Blowing Room Operatives, and Mullin was elected as its first general secretary.

As secretary, Mullin's most famous contribution was leading the union through a 21-week strike in 1892/93. Around that time, he served as president of the United Textile Factory Workers' Association, a loose federation bringing together textile workers' unions. However, the Cardroom Amalgamation left the association in 1913 after its member William Henry Carr was not re-adopted as Parliamentary candidates.

Mullin was active in the Trades Union Congress (TUC), and served as President of the TUC in 1911. In this capacity, he was invited to attend the Coronation of King George V. He was noted as one of the first trade unionists to be appointed as a magistrate, and he served on the Board of Trade and the Cotton Control Board.

Mullin became ill and underwent an operation in January 1920. Although his health improved enough for him to resume some of his trade union duties, this was temporary, and he died in June.

Trade union offices
Preceded by New position	General Secretary of the Amalgamated Association of Card and Blowing Room Operatives; 1886 – 1920	Succeeded by William Thomasson
Preceded by David Holmes	President of the United Textile Factory Workers' Association; 1890s – 1913	Succeeded by William Cornforth Robinson
Preceded by Matthew Arrandale and Enoch Edwards	Trades Union Congress representative to the American Federation of Labour; 1903; With: James O'Grady	Succeeded by William Abraham and James Wignall
Preceded by James Haslam	President of the Trades Union Congress; 1911	Succeeded by Will Thorne
