= 1902 Clitheroe by-election =

By-election for the Parliamentary Constituency of Clitheroe in 1902

The 1902 Clitheroe by-election was held on 1 August 1902 after the incumbent Liberal MP Sir Ughtred Kay-Shuttleworth was elevated to the House of Lords. The Labour Representation Committee candidate David Shackleton won the by-election unopposed.

== Background ==
The incumbent Liberal MP Sir Ughtred Kay-Shuttleworth was among the new peers in the 1902 Coronation Honours announced on 26 June. He was elevated to the House of Lords as Baron Shuttleworth the following month, and thus had to resign his seat in the House of Commons.

== Candidates ==
The barrister Augustine Birrell was mentioned as a possible candidate for the Liberal Party, but withdrew his candidature early; as he found the constituency too far away from London to be able to give it adequate time to contest the seat. Philip Stanhope, a former Liberal MP for Wednesbury and for Burnley was adopted as a candidate in early July, and considered running, but stated in an interview that he wanted an alliance between the Liberals and Labour.

The Conservatives considered several candidates, including Colonel John William Robinson Parker, of Browsholme Hall, who had just returned from the Second Boer War in South Africa.

David Shackleton was the General Secretary of the Textile Factory Workers Association. Although the textile workers had not yet joined the Labour Representation Committee, Shackleton was appointed as their candidate for the by-election. Philip Snowden, who had been considered by the Independent Labour Party, withdrew from the race. The Liberals and Conservatives also withdrew, sensing Shackleton's strong lead.

== Result ==
Shackleton was the only nominated candidate, and was elected unopposed at a meeting at Clitheroe Town Hall on 1 August. He became the third MP for the Labour Representation Committee (which would later become the Labour Party) and the first to win at a by-election. The textile workers' unions affiliated to the Labour Representative Committee shortly afterwards. Shackleton served as Chairman of the Parliamentary Labour Party for a period.
