= Burnley and District Weavers', Winders' and Beamers' Association =

English trade union

Burnley Weavers' Association
- Burnley and District Weavers', Winders' and Beamers' Association
- Merged into: Burnley, Nelson and District Textile Workers' Union
- Founded: 1870
- Dissolved: 1966
- Headquarters: Weavers' Institute, Charlotte Street, Burnley
- Location: England
- Members: 27,000 (1920)
- Parent organization: Amalgamated Weavers' Association

The Burnley and District Weavers', Winders' and Beamers' Association was a trade union representing workers in the cotton industry in the Burnley area of Lancashire, in England. As cotton manufacturing dominated the town's economy, the trade union played an important role in the town, and several union officials became prominent national figures.

== History ==
A union of weavers had existed in Burnley from the 1840s until about 1863, while a second was formed in 1866, but both collapsed, following opposition from employers. This concerned the North East Lancashire Amalgamated Weavers' Association, which saw an opportunity to organise in the town, and it began recruiting local weavers to the Chorley Weavers' Association, one of its affiliates.

By 1870, the Chorley union had enough members in Burnley that they were able to form their own, independent, union, the Burnley and District Weavers' Winders' and Beamers' Association. The end of the decade saw a downturn in the trade and the new union organised industrial action. It struggled to keep going, but did survive, and in 1884 it affiliated to the new Amalgamated Weavers' Association (AWA). By 1892, the union had 10,043 members, and this grew to a peak of 27,000 in 1920. It was the largest union affiliated to the AWA.

In 1892, the union declared itself in support of socialism, and that it politically and financially support efforts to form an independent socialist party. A member of the Social Democratic Federation (SDF) was elected as vice-president in 1895, and this led the SDF's leader, H. M. Hyndman, to unsuccessfully contest the Burnley constituency at the 1895 UK general election. The following year, Liberal-Labour members of the union, such as president David Holmes, overturned the socialist policies, leading SDF supporters to form a small breakaway union. This survived for several years, but did not grow, and was eventually dissolved.

The period from 1920 saw a long downturn in the Lancashire cotton trade, and membership of the union fell to little over 2,000. As a result, in 1966 it merged with the Nelson and District Weavers' Association, forming the Burnley, Nelson and District Textile Workers' Union.

== General Secretaries ==
1894: Fred Thomas
1912: James Hindle
1940: Robinson Graham
1947: Harold Dickinson

== Presidents ==
1871: David Holmes
1906: Robert Pollard
1915: Edward Ellis Birtwistle
Harold Hudson
