= Lewis Wright, Baron Wright of Ashton under Lyne =

English politician

Lewis Tatham Wright, Baron Wright of Ashton under Lyne, CBE (born Stiles; 11 October 1903 – 16 September 1974), was an English politician whose career was strongly connected with the textile industry in Lancashire in North West England. He was also President of the Trades Union Congress.

Lewis Wright was born Lewis Ebenezer Tatham Stiles in Birchington-on-Sea, Kent, the son of David Mortimer Stiles. He changed his name after his mother, Lilly, remarried Percy Wright. He moved to Lancashire as a boy and left school at age 16 to become a weaver. He was an important trade union leader in the United Kingdom, who rose to fame in the mid 20th century as an influential figure in the British textile industry, representing first the Amalgamated Weavers Association, the Cotton Board and later the Textile Council.

Already a Commander of the Order of the British Empire, Wright was further honoured when Harold Wilson's government awarded him a life peerage in the 1968 New Year Honours list. On 22 January 1968, he was created Baron Wright of Ashton under Lyne, of Ashton-under-Lyne in the County Palatine of Lancaster and took his seat in the House of Lords on 7 February. Later in 1968, he became General Secretary and President of the Trades Union Congress, and was awarded an Honorary Doctorate of Technology from Loughborough University.

He married Kathleen Firth in 1933 and they had two sons. He died in Ashton-under-Lyne in 1974.

Lord Wright lived at 12 Brookfield Grove in Ashton-under-Lyne from 1940 until his death in September 1974. A blue plaque commemorating him was unveiled there by Tameside Metropolitan Borough Council on 20 September 2005.

Trade union offices
Preceded by Stephen T. Goggins	General Secretary of the Ashton Weavers' Association; 1935–1953	Succeeded by Fred Hague
Preceded by Carey Hargreaves	President of the Amalgamated Weavers' Association; 1949–1953	Succeeded by Harold Bradley
Preceded by Andrew Naesmith	General Secretary of the Amalgamated Weavers' Association; 1953–1968	Succeeded by Harry Kershaw
Preceded by Andrew Naesmith and Alfred Roberts	Cotton Group member of the General Council of the Trades Union Congress; 1953 – 1968; With: Alfred Roberts (1953 – 1963)	Succeeded by Group abolished
Preceded by Harry Douglass	President of the Trades Union Congress; 1968	Succeeded by John E. Newton
