= Hyde and District Card, Blowing and Ring Frame Operatives' Association =

Former trade union of the United Kingdom

- Merged into: South East Lancashire and Cheshire Textile Operatives' Association
- Founded: 1860
- Dissolved: 1967
- Headquarters: 144 George Street, Hyde
- Location: England
- Members: 4,809 (1927)
- Parent organization: Cardroom Amalgamation

The Hyde and District Card, Blowing and Ring Frame Operatives' Association was a trade union representing cotton industry workers in Hyde and surrounding areas of Cheshire in England.

The union described itself as having been founded in 1860, although the Board of Trade claimed that it was founded in 1859. From its earliest years, it wanted to create a federal union, bringing together the various local unions of cardroom workers, and in 1865 it formed the United Association of Card and Blowing Room Operatives of Great Britain. Despite its name, this union covered only Hyde and southern Lancashire, and it soon relocated its headquarters to Ashton-under-Lyne before disappearing. The union next attempted to revive the Unity of Cardroom and Weavers' Operatives Association, which had united some cotton industry workers in the 1850s, but this came to little.

In 1886, the Hyde union was a founder constituent of the Cardroom Workers' Amalgamation (CWA), which for the first time proved an enduring association of local cardroom workers' unions. As part of the amalgamation, the Hyde union began a steady increase in membership, from 247 in 1886, to 738 in 1892 and 1,153 in 1900. The small Hadfield Cardroom Association merged into the Hyde union in 1908, followed by the Glossop Cardroom Association in 1909, and this boosted membership to over 2,500. Membership continued to grow through the 1910s, and reached a peak of 4,809 in 1927. It then began a gradual decline, in line with employment in the regional cotton industry.

In 1967, the union merged with the South East Lancashire Provincial Card and Blowing Room Operatives' Association and the Stockport Cardroom and Ring Spinners' Association, forming the South East Lancashire and Cheshire Textile Operatives' Association.

== General Secretaries ==
1890s: Walter Gee
1922: F. Grimes
1930s: James Quill
1950s: J. Carter
