= David Holmes (trade unionist) =

British trade unionist

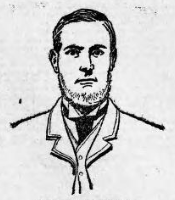
- Holmes in 1895
- Born: November 16, 1843; Manchester, England, United Kingdom
- Died: January 14, 1906 (aged 62); United Kingdom
- Occupation: Trade unionist

David Holmes (16 November 1843 – 14 January 1906) was a British trade unionist.

Born in Manchester, Holmes worked as a weaver from the age of 8. When he was ten, he ran away from home to live with an uncle in Padiham. He continued weaving but also received some education at the local Unitarian chapel.

Early in the 1860s, Holmes married and the couple moved to Burnley. There, he was a leading founder member of the Burnley Weavers' Association. In 1871, he was elected as its president and served until his death. He focused his activities on promoting collective bargaining for wages; he opposed the eight-hour day and supported child labour, as he believed that they contributed to the weavers' comparative advantage over workers elsewhere.

Despite his moderation, he was blacklisted by employers and instead took work as a rag-and-bone man to support his family, alongside his union role. In 1878, he led the union in part of a major but unsuccessful county-wide strike. That led, in 1884, to the creation of the Northern Counties Amalgamated Association of Weavers, with Holmes as president.

Holmes was a member of the Parliamentary Committee of the Trades Union Congress (TUC), where he opposed the new unions, which organised unskilled labour, and attended various international conferences representing the organisation.

Politically, Holmes was a supporter of the Liberal Party, and he served on Burnley Town Council. He was an opponent of socialism and of the Labour Party when it emerged. However, his protégé and designated successor, David Shackleton, would join the Labour Party.

Holmes stood down from the TUC in 1902 and became less active elsewhere.

Trade union offices
Preceded by New position	President of the Burnley Weavers' Association; 1870 – 1906	Succeeded by Robert Pollard
Preceded by New position	President of the Northern Counties Amalgamated Association of Weavers; 1884 – 1906	Succeeded by David Shackleton
Preceded by New position	President of the United Textile Factory Workers' Association; 1889 – 1890s	Succeeded by William Mullin
Preceded by John Burns	Chairman of the Parliamentary Committee of the Trades Union Congress; 1894	Succeeded by Edward Cowey
Preceded by New position	Trades Union Congress representative to the American Federation of Labour; 1894; With: John Burns	Succeeded by Edward Cowey and James Mawdsley
