= Amalgamated Textile Workers' Union =

Trade union

- Merged into: General, Municipal, Boilermakers and Allied Trades Union
- Founded: 1 January 1974
- Dissolved: 1985
- Headquarters: Textile Union Centre, 5 Caton Street, Rochdale
- Location: United Kingdom
- Members: 19,500 (1983)
- Affiliations: TUC, ITGLWF

The Amalgamated Textile Workers' Union (ATWU) was a trade union in Great Britain.

== History ==
The union was founded in 1974, when the Amalgamated Weavers' Association merged with the National Union of Textile and Allied Workers. The Amalgamated Textile Warehousemen's Association developed close links with the new union, and the two shared a general secretary.

In 1983, the important Burnley, Nelson, Rossendale and District Textile Workers' Union decided to leave the ATWU, and argued that as its largest affiliate, it should be entitled to a proportionate share of the union's funds. The ATWU disagreed, and the dispute went to the High Court of England and Wales, which rejected the Burnley and Nelson union's claim.

With widespread redundancies in the industry, the union lost two-thirds of its members before it merged into the General, Municipal, Boilermakers and Allied Trades Union in 1985. Based in Rochdale, the union's final general secretary was Jack Brown.

== Affiliates ==
By 1982, the union had the following affiliates:

Blackburn and District Weavers', Winders' and Warpers' Association
Bolton and District Union of Textile and Allied Workers
Bolton and District Weavers', Winders' and Warpers' Association
Burnley, Nelson, Rossendale and District Textile Workers' Union
Colne and Craven Textile Workers' Association
Oldham Provincial Union of Textile and Allied Workers
National Union of Textile and Allied Workers, Rochdale and Districts
Northern Textile and Allied Workers' Union
North Lancashire and Cumbria Textile Workers' Association
North West Lancashire, Durham and Cumbria Textile Workers' Union
Rochdale and Todmorden District of the Amalgamated Textile Workers' Union
Southern Area
Staff Section
Wigan

== Leadership ==
=== General Secretaries ===
1974: Fred Hague and Joe King
1975: Fred Hague
1976: Jack Brown

=== Presidents ===
1974: Jim Browning
1976: Joe Quinn
1984: Albert Hilton
