= David Shackleton =

British cotton worker and trade unionist

Sir David Shackleton KCB
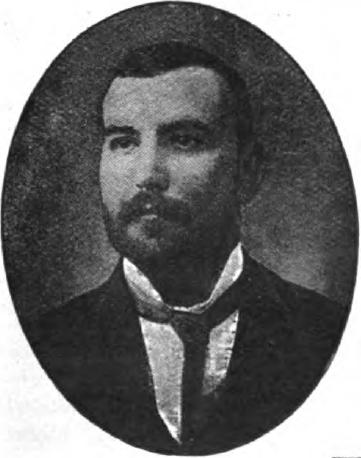
- David Shackleton in the mid-1900s

Deputy Leader of the Labour Party
- In office 12 February 1906 – 28 January 1908
- Leader: Keir Hardie
- Preceded by: Office established
- Succeeded by: George Barnes

Member of Parliament for Clitheroe
- In office 1 August 1902 – 30 November 1910
- Preceded by: Ughtred Kay-Shuttleworth
- Succeeded by: Albert Smith

Personal details
- Born: David James Shackleton; 21 November 1863 Cloughfold, Lancashire, UK
- Died: 1 August 1938 (aged 74)
- Party: Labour
- Other political affiliations: Labour Representation Committee

Sir David James Shackleton KCB (21 November 1863 – 1 August 1938) was a cotton worker and trade unionist who became the third Labour Member of Parliament in the United Kingdom, following the formation of the Labour Representation Committee. He later became a senior civil servant.

== Early life and career ==
Shackleton was born in Cloughfold near Rawtenstall, Lancashire. He became a cotton worker at the age of nine. He rose through the ranks of the cotton weavers' union and became general secretary of the Textile Factory Workers Association. He was a member of the Darwen Town Council, and member of the Blackburn Chamber of Commerce.

== Political career ==
Although the textile workers had not yet joined the LRC, Shackleton was appointed its candidate for the Clitheroe by-election in 1902. Philip Snowden, who had been considered by the Independent Labour Party, withdrew from the race. The Liberals and Conservatives also withdrew, sensing Shackleton's strong lead. He was thus elected unopposed on 1 August 1902. The textile workers' unions affiliated to the LRC shortly afterwards. Shackleton served as Chairman of the Parliamentary Labour Party for a period.

Shackleton (on right) in 1906, with other leading figures in the party

Shackleton became chairman of the Trades Union Congress in 1906, maintaining his powerful position in the trade union movement. In 1910, Winston Churchill invited him to join the civil service and Shackleton left Parliament.

He quickly rose to the rank of permanent secretary in the new Ministry of Labour and is considered the first man from a working-class background to rise to such a senior position.

== Source ==
- The Lancashire Giant: David Shackleton, Labour Leader and Civil Servant (2000), Ross M Martin, ISBN 0-85323-934-7

Parliament of the United Kingdom
Preceded by Sir Ughtred Kay-Shuttleworth	Member of Parliament for Clitheroe; 1902–Dec 1910	Succeeded by Albert Smith
Party political offices
Preceded by John Hodge	Chair of the Labour Party; 1904–1905	Succeeded by Arthur Henderson
Trade union offices
Preceded by Joseph Cross	General Secretary of the Darwen Weavers' Association; 1894 – 1907	Succeeded by John Parkington
Preceded by Joseph Nicholas Bell and Allan Gee	Trades Union Congress representative to the American Federation of Labour; 1907; With: John Hodge	Succeeded by Herbert Skinner and John Wadsworth
Preceded by David Holmes	President of the Northern Counties Amalgamated Association of Weavers; 1906 – 1910	Succeeded by John William Ogden
Preceded by Alfred Gill	President of the Trades Union Congress; 1908 and 1909	Succeeded by James Haslam
Government offices
Preceded by none	Permanent Secretary of the Ministry of Labour; 1916–1921; With: Sir James Masterton-Smith (1920–1921)	Succeeded by Sir Horace Wilson
