= Colne and District Weavers', Winders' and Beamers' Association =

Former trade union of the United Kingdom

Colne Weavers' Association
- Colne and District Weavers', Winders' and Beamers' Association
- Merged into: Colne and Craven Textile Workers' Association
- Founded: 1882
- Dissolved: 1975
- Headquarters: Tower Buildings, Colne
- Location: England
- Members: 6,258 (1907)
- Parent organization: Amalgamated Weavers' Association

The Colne and District Weavers', Winders' and Beamers' Association was a trade union representing cotton weavers in the Colne area of Lancashire in England.

The union was founded by 1882, although some writers have suggested that it was already in existence by the late 1870s. In its early years, it repeatedly tried to increase the area which it covered, trying and failing to create branches in Earby, Foulridge and Trawden. Despite this, its membership gradually grew, reaching 1,000 members by 1892, 2,917 by 1897, and 6,258 in 1907.

The union was a founder member of the Amalgamated Weavers' Association, in 1884.

Membership of the union fell through much of the 20th-century, in line with declining employment in the Lancashire cotton industry. By 1960, membership was down to 2,243. In 1975, it merged with the Barnoldswick and District Weavers', Winders' Beamers' and Textile Workers' Association and the Skipton and District Weavers' Association, forming the Colne and Craven Textile Workers' Association.

== General secretaries ==
G. Berry
1905: Tom Shaw
1923: William H. Boocock
1936: E. S. Kay
1937: F. Walne
1940s: H. Hope
