= Bolton and District Card, Blowing and Ring Room Operatives' Provincial Association =

Former trade union of the United Kingdom

Bolton Cardroom Union
- Bolton and District Card, Blowing and Ring Room Operatives' Provincial Association
- Merged into: North West Lancashire, Durham and Cumbria Textile Workers' Union
- Founded: 1858
- Dissolved: 1982
- Headquarters: 77 St George's Road, Bolton
- Location: England
- Members: 15,339 (1919)
- Parent organization: Cardroom Amalgamation

The Bolton and District Card, Blowing and Ring Room Operatives' Provincial Association was a trade union representing cotton industry workers in the Bolton area of Lancashire in England. The longest-established union of cardroom workers, it was central to early attempts to establish a national union for the industry.

The union was founded in 1858 as the Bolton Card Grinders' and Strippers' Association, and became the longest-surviving union of cardroom workers. The new union founded a National Union of Associations of Cardroom Operatives, which succeeded in establishing new unions in Stockport and Chorley, but struggled during the following decade, coming only to cover unions local to Bolton. The federation dissolved in the 1880s.

From the start, the union was open to women, and this policy allowed membership to reach 300 in the town by 1860. However, concerned that it was recruiting new members who were more likely to find themselves out of work and requiring union funds, that year, the union decided to stop accepting new members. By 1863, this had led membership to fall to only fifty, and membership was re-opened, albeit with a high entrance fee. However, recruitment was slow, with women in particular struggling to afford this new fee. By 1866, the union had no remaining women members, and decided to donate the funds of its women's section to a group of local women who had been involved in a strike. A women's section was re-established in 1873, and by the end of the year, around half of the union's 150 members were women.

The 1870s saw the start of the Long Depression, and over the decade, almost all of the union's members left. However, it was reorganised by Joseph Edge in 1879. He served as general secretary until 1926, taking the union into the new Cardroom Amalgamation, although it did not take part in the amalgamation's collective bargaining for many years. Membership increased greatly under his leadership, reaching 1,100 in 1885, 5,616 in 1905, and 15,339 in 1919. In 1886 the union was renamed as the Bolton and District Card, Blowing, Ring and Throstle Room Operatives' Association, reflecting its greater areas of recruitment. The union was reorganised into a number of branches, peaking at 11, although only four from 1910 until 1936, when a branch was established in Leigh.

In 1910, the union was renamed as the "Bolton and District Card, Blowing and Ring Room Operatives' Provincial Association". Because Bolton was known for higher-quality cotton spinning than other districts, it was little affected by the Great Depression, and so membership remained stable, peaking at 15,466 in 1936. By this stage, around 90% of union members were women.

The cotton industry and union membership declined after World War II, but only slowly in Bolton until the late 1950s. In 1968, it was renamed as the Bolton and District Union of Textile and Allied Workers. In 1982, it merged with the Bolton and District Weavers', Winders' and Warpers' Association, the North Lancashire and Cumbria Textile Workers' Association and the Chorley, Skelmersdale and Wigan Amalgamated Textile Workers' Unions to form the North West Lancashire, Durham and Cumbria Textile Workers' Union, which joined the GMB in 1986.

== General Secretaries ==
1879: Joseph Edge
1926: Albert Edge
1938: William Roberts
1950s: W. Prescott
1961: Jack Brown
1960s: F. Whiteside
