= Amalgamated Weavers' Association =

Former trade union of the United Kingdom

- Merged into: Amalgamated Textile Workers' Union
- Founded: 1884
- Dissolved: 1974
- Headquarters: Chronicle Buildings, 74 Corporation Street, Manchester
- Location: United Kingdom
- Members: 219,329 (1921)
- Affiliations: TUC, GFTU, NCTTF, UTFWA

The Amalgamated Weavers' Association, often known as the Weavers' Amalgamation, was a trade union in the United Kingdom. Initially, it operated in competition with the North East Lancashire Amalgamated Weavers' Association in part of its area, and it was therefore nicknamed the Second Amalgamation.

== History ==
The union was founded in 1884 as the Northern Counties Amalgamated Association of Weavers, with the participation of thirty-four local trade unions:

Union	Founded	Affiliated	Members (1907)	Notes
Accrington and District	1858	1884	4,409	Merged into Accrington, Church & Oswaldtwistle in 1949
Ashton-under-Lyne and District	1877	1884	5,319	Merged into South-East Lancashire and Cheshire in 1972
Bacup and District	1888	?	1,889	Merged into Todmorden, Bacup and District in 1952
Bamber Bridge and District	1884	1884	796	Merged into Preston and District in 1940
Barnoldswick and District	1880s	?	990	
Blackburn and District	1854	1884	14,800	
Blackburn Protection	1885	1900	4,369	Merged into Blackburn in 1949
Bolton and District	1865	1884	5,059	Left 1885, rejoined 1892
Burnley and District	1870	1884	18,500	Merged into Burnley & Nelson in 1966
Bury and District	1884	?	4,087	Merged into North-West Lancashire and Yorkshire in 1973
Chorley and District	1855	1884	4,620	Dissolved 1956
Church and Oswaldtwistle	1858	1884	3,232	Merged into Accrington, Church and Oswaldtwistle in 1949
Clayton-le-Moors	1858	1884	1,750	Dissolved 1962
Clitheroe	1870	1884	2,700	
Colne and District	1879	1884	6,258	
Darwen	1857	1884	8,298	Merged into Blackburn in 1960
Glossop and District	1871	1892	1,118	Merged into Hyde in 1922
Great Harwood	1858	1884	4,750	
Haslingden	1858	1884	2,400	Merged into Rossendale in 1961
Heywood, Castleton, Norden and District	1877	1884	2,500	Merged into North-West Lancashire and Yorkshire in 1973
Hyde and District	1880	1884	7,150	Merged into South-East Lancashire and Cheshire in 1972
Leek	1919	1951	N/A	Disaffiliated in 1955
Longridge	1878	1884	625	Dissolved 1964
Macclesfield	1886	1886	589	Dissolved in 1920s
Manchester, Salford and Pendleton	1907	1909	270 (1908)	Merged into Ashton 1951
Nelson and District	1870	1884	11,000	Merged into Burnley & Nelson in 1966
Oldham and District	1859	1884	4,900	
Padiham and District	1856	1884	6,010	
Preston and District	1858	1884	7,000	
Radcliffe	1852	?	1,326	Merged into Bury in 1911
Ramsbottom and District	1857	1884	2,116	
Rishton	1878	1884	1,762	Merged into Harwood in 1964
Rochdale and District	1878	1884	3,300	Left in 1896, rejoined 1906, merged into North-West Lancashire and Yorkshire in 1973
Rossendale	1873	1892	2,800	
Sabden	1884	1884	133	Merged into Harwood in 1932
Saddleworth and District	1894	1890s	485	Disaffiliated 1921
Skipton and District	1902	?	1,421	
Stockport and District	1867	1884	1,590	Dissolved 1900, refounded 1906
Todmorden and District	1880	1884	4,166	Merged into Todmorden & Bacup in 1952
Whitworth Vale	1882	1892	1,150	Merged into Rochdale in 1935
Wigan and District	1890	1893	454	Left 1897, rejoined 1909

The majority of the union's members were female: in 1894, 45,000 of its 80,000 total membership were women. This was unusual; outside the cotton industry, very few women were members of trade unions. By 1937, membership had risen to 94,000, and the proportion of women had grown further, to a total of 75,000 of its members.

For many years, the union campaigned against the practice of steaming in cotton mills.

The union took its final name in 1923. In 1974, it merged with the National Union of Textile and Allied Workers to form the Amalgamated Textile Workers' Union.

== Affiliated membership ==
The total membership of the union's affiliates grew steadily, peaked in 1922, then fell almost continuously until the union was dissolved.

Year	Membership
1884	37,539
1890	46,102
1900	81,500
1910	114,434
1920	211,621
1930	162,601
1940	86,843
1950	75,849
1960	55,647
1968	33,066

== Leadership ==
=== General Secretaries ===
1884: Thomas Birtwistle
1885: William Henry Wilkinson
1906: Joseph Cross
1925: John C. Parker
1927: Andrew Naesmith
1953: Lewis Wright
1968: Harry Kershaw
1971: Fred Hague

=== Presidents ===
1884: David Holmes
1906: David Shackleton
1911: John William Ogden
1930: James Hindle
1937: James Bell
1947: Carey Hargreaves
1949: Lewis Wright
1954: Harold Bradley
1960: Ernest Thornton
1964: Fred Hague
1970: Hilda Unsworth
