= North East Lancashire Amalgamated Weavers' Association =

Former trade union of the United Kingdom

- Founded: 1858
- Dissolved: 1903
- Location: United Kingdom
- Members: 8,185 (1870)
- Key people: Thomas Birtwistle
- Affiliations: TUC

The North East Lancashire Amalgamated Weavers' Association was a trade union federation of local weavers' unions in part of Lancashire in England, in the 19th century.

== History ==
The federation was founded in 1858 as the East Lancashire Amalgamated Weavers' Friendly Association, with a membership of 4,645. It was organised by Thomas Birtwistle, who believed that a federation of the many local weavers' unions in the county would improve the workers' position in wage negotiations. Initially, the Over Darwen, Church, Accrington, Harwood, Padiham, Chorley and Haslingden unions joined; larger unions such as those in Burnley and Nelson did not, as they felt able to manage their own affairs.

Birtwistle became the federation's first general secretary, and was felt to have succeeded in his limited remit. By the end of the 1860s, the Clitheroe, Enfield and Ramsbottom unions had also joined, taking membership over 8,000. The Burnley and Nelson unions both collapsed in the 1860s; the association established branches in these towns in 1870, which grew rapidly and became independent affiliates in 1871.

Encouraged by its success, during the 1870s, the federation ran a major campaign for shorter hours. In 1878, it organised a strike against a 10% cut in wages; employers responded by locking out workers not already taking part, but the strike was lost after nine weeks. This led to a restructuring of the federation, which took the new name of the "North East Lancashire Amalgamated Weavers' Association" and began paying death benefits to members, and representing them in disputes relating to work stoppages, unfair treatment, fines and the breakdown of machinery.

In 1884, Birtwistle founded the Northern Counties Amalgamated Association of Weavers, covering a broader area, and this soon eclipsed the North East Lancashire association, which became informally known as the First Amalgamation. Despite this, Birtwistle remained secretary until 1892, when he retired. At this point, most of the affiliates left, but the federation was not dissolved until 1903.

== Affiliates ==
As of 1884, the association's affiliates were:

Union	Founded	Affiliated
Accrington	1858	1863
Bamber Bridge	1884	1884
Burnley	1870	1871
Chorley	1855	1858
Church and Oswaldtwistle	1858	1858
Clayton-le-Moors	1858	1866
Clitheroe	1870	1870
Colne	1879	1880
Great Harwood and Billington	1858	1858
Haslingden	1858	1858
Nelson	1870	1871
Padiham	1856	1858
Ramsbottom	1857	1860s
Rishton	1878	1878

== General Secretaries ==
1861: Thomas Birtwistle
1892: E. J. Holmes
1896: A. H. Cottam
