= Cardroom Amalgamation =

English trade union

- Amalgamated Association of Card and Blowing and Ring Room Operatives
- Merged into: Amalgamated Textile Workers' Union
- Founded: 1886
- Dissolved: 1974
- Headquarters: 81 Fountain Street, Manchester
- Location: United Kingdom
- Members: 52,000 (1910)
- Affiliations: TUC, UTFWA

The Cardroom Amalgamation or Cardroom Workers' Amalgamation (CWA) was a British trade union which existed between 1886 and 1974. It represented workers in the cotton textile industry.

== History ==
The union was founded in 1886 as the Amalgamated Association of Card and Blowing Room Operatives, by the amalgamation of a few small, local unions. This followed the Oldham weavers' strike of 1885, which had led to non-unionised cardroom workers being locked out and losing their wages.

Affiliates of the union were:

Union	Founded	Affiliated	Membership (1907)	Notes
Accrington	1886	1886	1,415	Merged into North East Lancashire
Ashton	1865	1886	N/A	Merged into South East Lancashire 1887
Bacup and District	1889	1890	82	Disaffiliated 1893
Bamber Bridge and District	1922	1922	N/A	Dissolved 1960s
Blackburn and District	1883	1886	1,755	Merged into Wigan, Blackburn and District about 1970
Bollington	1880s	1890	N/A	Disaffiliated 1892
Bolton and District	1858	1886	8,500	
Bury and District	1879	1886	1,340	
Glossop	1886	1886	133	Merged into Hyde and District 1909
Hadfield	1860	1886	164	Merged into Hyde and District 1908
Heywood	1864	1888	1,356	Merged into Rochdale 1967
Huddersfield and District	1891	1892		Disaffiliated 1892
Hull	c.1890	1892	N/A	Dissolved about 1894
Hyde and District	1860	1886	2,128	Merged into South East Lancashire and Cheshire 1967
Macclesfield and District	1885	1886	153	Dissolved 1921
Manchester	c.1880	1886	N/A	Disaffiliated 1889–1891 and from 1893
Mossley	1875	1886	743	Dissolved 1942
North East Lancashire	1886	1886		
Oldham	1880	1886	16,211	
Oldham Cop-Packers	1908	1914	N/A	Dissolved 1967
Preston	1897	1897	1,000	Predecessor held membership 1886–1891; merged into North East Lancashire 1961
Rochdale	1879	1886	2,900	
Radcliffe	Unknown	1886	N/A	Merged into Bury 1890
Roller Coverers	1920	1920	N/A	Dissolved 1960s
Salford and District	1895	1895	N/A	Dissolved 1898
South East Lancashire	1887	1887	5,333	Merged into South East Lancashire and Cheshire 1967
Stalybridge	1885	1886	N/A	Merged into South East Lancashire 1887
Sowerby Bridge and District	1892	1892	N/A	Disaffiliated later in 1892
Stockport	1859	1886	1,700	Merged into South East Lancashire and Cheshire 1967
Warrington	1892	1893	N/A	Disaffiliated 1894, predecessor affiliated in 1889
Wigan and District	1888	1888	1,647	Merged into Wigan and Blackburn 1967

The union represented a wide range of workers in the textile industry, and did not discriminate on the basis of occupation or skill. The core of the union's membership were the strippers and grinders, skilled adult male mechanics, who maintained the carding engines. Almost all strippers and grinders were union members. The CWA also organised less skilled female ring spinners and other mill operatives. From 1904 onwards the only members required to have completed an apprenticeship were the strippers-and-grinders.

The CWA grew rapidly and by 1910 it had 52,000 members. In 1924, it changed its name to the Amalgamated Association of Card and Blowing and Ring Room Operatives, and in 1952 it became the National Association of Card, Blowing and Ring Room Operatives, before adopting its final name, the National Union of Textile and Allied Workers (NUTAW), in 1968.

The CWA was more aggressive in its attitude towards negotiating with employers than the other major cotton unions and by the mid-1960s the wages of strippers and grinders equalled those of mule spinners, traditionally the highest-paid textile workers.

In 1974, the union merged with the Amalgamated Weavers' Association, to form the Amalgamated Textile Workers' Union.

== General secretaries ==
1886: William Mullin
1920: William Thomasson
1935: Alfred Roberts
1962: Joe King

== Presidents ==
1886: George Silk
c.1890: Enoch Jones
1896: James Crinion
1926: Joseph Frayne
1936: Archie Robertson
1953: Harold Chorlton
1964: Jim Browning
1972: Roy Bennett
