= Charles Sitch =

British politician

Charles Henry Sitch (4 May 1887 – 13 June 1960) was Labour MP for Kingswinford.

Born in Saltney in Flintshire, Sitch grew up in Cradley Heath, where his father, Thomas Sitch, was General Secretary of the Chain Makers' and Strikers' Association (CMSA). He studied at Ruskin College and was also active in the CMSA.

Sitch was elected to Rowley Regis Urban District Council in 1913, serving as a Liberal-Labour member, and was president of the South Staffordshire and Worcestershire Federation of Trades Councils from 1914. In 1916, he resigned from the Liberal Party and joined the Labour Party, and under this banner, he won the Kingswinford seat at the 1918 United Kingdom general election.

Sitch succeeded his father as general secretary of the CMSA in 1923, holding the post alongside his Parliamentary duties until 1931, when he lost his seat. He remained secretary of the CMSA until 1933, when he was found to have embezzled union funds, and was sentenced to nine months in prison.

In 1937, Sitch found work in Leeds with Reynolds News and the Sunday Citizen, remaining there until 1952.

Parliament of the United Kingdom
Preceded by Henry Staveley-Hill	Member of Parliament for Kingswinford; 1918–1931	Succeeded by Alan Todd
Trade union offices
Preceded by Thomas Sitch	General Secretary of the Chain Makers' and Strikers' Association; 1923–1933	Succeeded by Bert Head
