= Cosens =

Cosens is a surname.

Notable people with the name include:

- Aubrey Cosens (1921–1945), Canadian soldier
- Barbara Cosens, American legal scholar
- Dora Cosens (1894–1945), British architect
- Ed Cosens, musician with Reverend and The Makers
- George Cosens (1805–1881), Jamaican-British minister
- Keith Cosens (1932–1990), Canadian politician
- Marty Cosens (1935–2001), Argentine singer and actor

== See also ==
- Cosens & Company
