= William George Webb =

British politician (1843–1905)

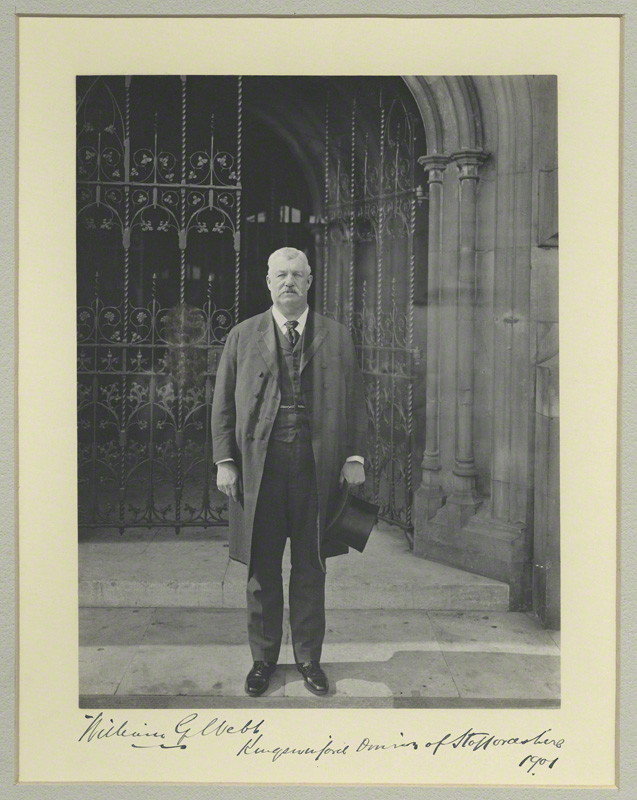
William George Webb, 1901 photograph

William George Webb (1843 – 14 June 1905) was an English businessman, brewer and politician. He was Member of Parliament for Kingswinford.

== Life ==
He was the elder son of Edward Webb (1810–1872) of Wordsley, Staffordshire, and his wife Eliza. His father's business interests included glass manufacture at Amblecote and elsewhere (he was a cousin of the glassmaker Thomas Webb (1804–1869)), and milling. He became senior partner in the seed company Edward Webb & Sons, with agricultural seed farms of over 1000 acres at Kinver. The firm also acted as wool and hop merchants, and sold manure.

Webb commanded the South Staffordshire Militia, and used the rank of Colonel. He was elected to parliament at the 1900 United Kingdom general election, as a Conservative.

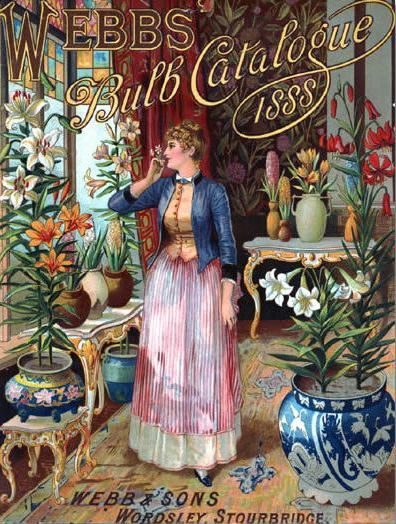
Publicity for Webbs

Webb died at Stourbridge following a short illness, aged 61. His estate was valued at over £500,000. He was a director of P. Phipps & Co. (Northampton and Towcester Breweries), where his place was taken by his brother Edward.

His vacated parliamentary seat was held by Henry Staveley-Hill in the by-election that followed.

== Family ==
Webb married Ada Pryce, daughter of Captain Broughton Pryce, at Wanstead on 14 October 1874. They had three sons and two daughters. The eldest son, W. Harcourt Webb, was wounded at Senekal in the Second Boer War, and later became managing director of Webb & Sons; another son, Frank, also served in the war.
