= Chain Makers' and Strikers' Association =

British trade union

- Founded: 6 July 1889
- Dissolved: 31 December 1977
- Headquarters: Unity Villa, Sidney Road, Cradley Heath
- Location: United Kingdom
- Members: 1,941 (1925)
- Key people: Thomas Sitch (Gen Sec)
- Affiliations: TUC, GFTU, Labour

The Chain Makers' and Strikers' Association (CMSA) was a trade union representing workers employed in the manufacture of chains in the United Kingdom, principally in the West Midlands.

== History ==
The union was founded in 1889 as the United Chain Makers' and Chain Strikers' Association of Saltney, Pontypridd and Staffordshire, by workers at the H. Wood & Co factory in Chester. Although chain-making was a minor industry in Chester, the union spread to the main areas of chain-making: Crewe, Pontypridd, St Helens, Shifnal and Tipton, and most importantly Cradley Heath, where the union soon relocated its headquarters.

In light of its increased remit, in 1899 the union renamed itself as the "Chain Makers' and Strikers' Association". It had 1,000 members by the end of the century, a majority of unionised workers in the industry. The small Factory Chain Makers' Union joined in 1904.

The union was involved in a major strike in Cradley Heath in 1910, when employers tried to get workers to agree in writing to accept less than agreed rates for their work. The strike succeeded in ending this practice.

The union's main rival was the Union of Block Chain Makers, but by the 1910s, the two shared a general secretary in Thomas Sitch, and the Block Chain Makers was merged into the Chain Makers in 1919, leading membership to peak at 1,941 in 1925. On Thomas' death in 1923, his son Charles became general secretary, and from 1918 to 1931, he served as a Member of Parliament sponsored by the union. However, in 1933, he was discovered to have embezzled funds and misrepresented its level of membership. He was removed from office, and later imprisoned, Bert Head succeeding as the new general secretary.

Head remained leader for more than fifty years, the longest-serving trade union leader in the UK. However, the industry was in a long decline, and membership also fell, dropping to only 228 in 1972. The union was long affiliated to the Trades Union Congress (TUC), but it registered with the government in defiance of TUC policy, and was expelled from the TUC and the General Federation of Trade Unions in 1972. This led the union to collapse, and it was dissolved in 1977.

== Election results ==
The union sponsored its general secretary as Labour Party candidate in each general election from 1918 to 1931.

Election	Constituency	Candidate	Votes	Percentage	Position
1918 general election	Kingswinford	Charles Sitch	10,397	47.6	1
1922 general election	Kingswinford	Charles Sitch	15,232	51.6	1
1923 general election	Kingswinford	Charles Sitch	15,174	49.5	1
1924 general election	Kingswinford	Charles Sitch	17,235	51.5	1
1929 general election	Kingswinford	Charles Sitch	22,479	53.2	1
1931 general election	Kingswinford	Charles Sitch	19,495	47.1	2

== General Secretaries ==
1889: Thomas Sitch
1923: Charles Sitch
1934: Bert Head
