= Edward Marten Dunne =

British Army officer and politician (1864–1944)

Lieutenant-Colonel Edward Marten Dunne (27 August 1864 – 23 February 1944) was a British army officer and Liberal politician.

== Career ==
Dunne was the third son of Thomas Dunne of Gatley Park and Bircher Hall, Herefordshire and his wife, Harriet (née Russell). His maternal grandfather was General Sir Edward Lechmere Graves Russell of Ashford Hall, Ludlow, Shropshire.

Following education at Wellington College, Berkshire and the Royal Military College, Sandhurst, he received a commission as an officer in the Border Regiment in 1884. He subsequently entered the Staff College, Camberley, passing out of the institution in 1891. In 1896 his father died, and he resigned his commission.

In 1899 he married Grace Daphne Rendel, daughter of Lord Rendel, former Liberal MP for Montgomeryshire. On the outbreak of the Second Boer War in the same year, he volunteered to return to the army, becoming brigade major at Aldershot. Following the war the couple moved to Gatley Park, an estate adjoining Wigmore Castle.

In 1905 Dunne unsuccessfully contested a by-election at Kingswinford for the Liberals. In the following year a general election was held, and he was elected to serve as Member of Parliament for Walsall. He was only an MP for one term: at the next general election in January 1910 he was defeated by his Conservative opponent. He was chosen as Liberal candidate for the Melton Division of Leicestershire at the next election in December, but was not elected.

On the outbreak of the First World War, Dunne was appointed to the staff of the 50th (Northumbrian) Division in Newcastle upon Tyne. In 1915 he was transferred to Chester, as part of the headquarters staff of the Western Command. He spent the latter part of the war on secondment to the War Office.

Following the war, he settled back into country life in Herefordshire, where he was appointed a deputy lieutenant on 15 January 1919. He was high sheriff of the county in 1922, and served as a county alderman on Herefordshire County Council, where he chaired the education committee.

== Family ==
Dunne married in 1899 Hon. Grace Daphne Rendel (1868–1952), daughter and co-heir of Lord Rendel. Her elder sister was married to Henry Gladstone, 1st Baron Gladstone of Hawarden. They had two daughters and a son:

- Sylvia Griselda Dunne (b1900).
- Monica Clarice Dunne (b. 23 December 1902); married Colonel Cyril George Darby, MC, and had a daughter and a son Adrian Darby.
- Philip Russell Rendel Dunne (28 February 1904 – 13 April 1965), who sat as Conservative MP for Stalybridge and Hyde from 1935 to 1937.

E M Dunne died in February 1944, aged 79. His widow died in 1952.

Parliament of the United Kingdom
Preceded by Arthur Divett Hayter	Member of Parliament for Walsall; 1906–1910	Succeeded by Richard Ashmole Cooper
