= Alan Todd =

Alan Livesey Stuart Todd (3 June 1900 – 14 August 1976) was a barrister and Conservative politician living at Clent.

== Biography ==
He studied at Wellington College and the University of Oxford. He was elected as a Member of Parliament in the 1931 General Election for the Kingswinford division of Staffordshire as a Conservative, but was not re-elected at the following election in 1935. During his time as a member for Parliament, he published a work on Indian Constitutional Reform (1934).

He was elected to Worcestershire County Council in 1938, and became an alderman of that council in 1953, remaining one until that role was abolished in 1974. He was President of the Bromsgrove Conservative Association from 1962 to 1967.

He held various Civil Service appointments during the Second World War and was executive director of the National Association of Drop Forgers and Stampers from 1948 to 1969. He became a Justice of the Peace for Staffordshire in 1939, serving as chairman of the Brierley Hill petty sessional division from 1958 to 1967 and as vice-chairman of the Seisdon division from 1967.

Locally, he represented Worcestershire County Council on the Conservators of Clent Hill Common from 1947 until the body was abolished in 1967. Soon after becoming a county councillor, he made efforts towards the preservation of the beauty of the Clent Hills. These ultimately led to the county council purchasing a tract, mostly of ill-managed woodland between Clent Hill and Walton Hill in 1957. This, together with Clent Hill Common and Walton Hill Common, were given to the National Trust in 1959. Todd then served on the National Trust Clent Hills Management Committee from its creation in 1967 until his death, latterly as a co-opted member.

Parliament of the United Kingdom
Preceded by Charles Sitch	Member of Parliament for Kingswinford; 1931–1935	Succeeded by Arthur Henderson
