= Cradley Heath =

Town in Sandwell, West Midlands, England

Coordinates: 52.47302°N 2.07908°W

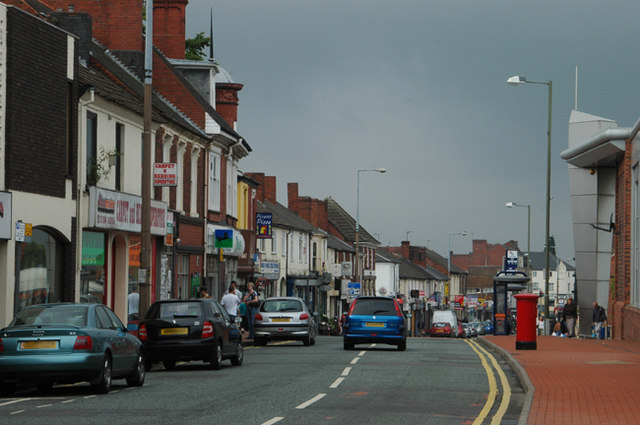
- Cradley Heath High Street

- Location within the West Midlands
- Population: 13,565 (2011) (Note: Cradley Heath & Old Hill ward.)
- OS grid reference: SO947861
- Metropolitan borough: Sandwell
- Metropolitan county: West Midlands
- Region: West Midlands
- Country: England
- Sovereign state: United Kingdom
- Post town: CRADLEY HEATH
- Postcode district: B64
- Dialling code: 01384
- Police: West Midlands
- Fire: West Midlands
- Ambulance: West Midlands
- UK Parliament: Halesowen and Rowley Regis

Cradley Heath is a town in the Metropolitan Borough of Sandwell, West Midlands, England. It is in the Black Country, 8 miles (13 km) west of Birmingham. The town was known for the manufacture of chains in the first half of the twentieth century.

== History ==
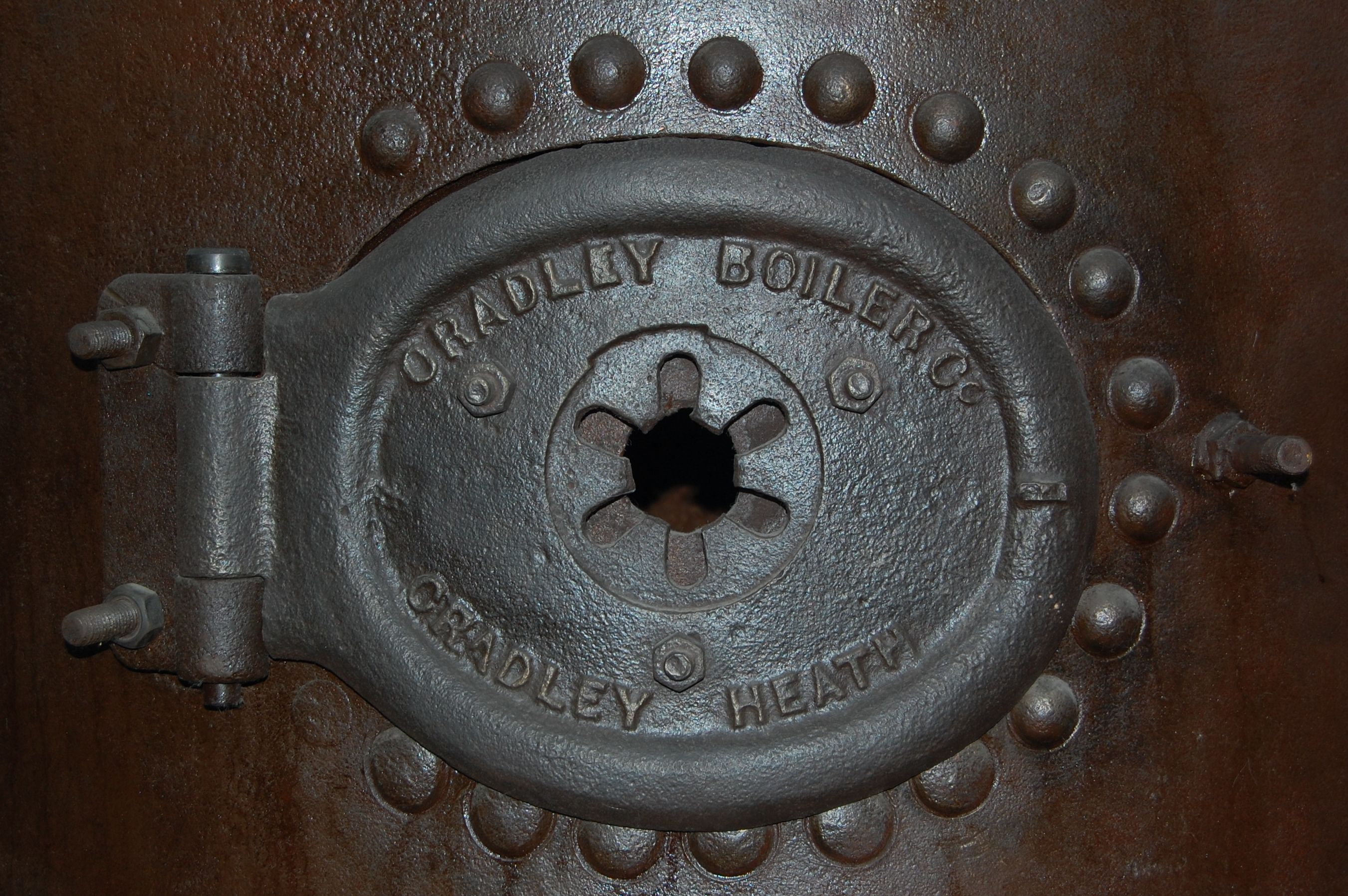
Firedoor of a boiler made by the Cradley Boiler Co, of Cradley Heath, displayed in the Black Country Living Museum.

The name Cradley has Saxon origins, likely derived from "Crudda's lēah," meaning "Crudda’s clearing" or meadow. The Domesday Book of 1086 records the settlement as "Cradelei" or "Cradelie," then held by Ansculf de Picquigny for the crown. Cradley Heath was originally an area of heathland between Cradley, Netherton, and Old Hill, in the Staffordshire parish of Rowley Regis. The residents of Cradley had grazing rights, subject to an annual payment to the Lord of the manor. This undeveloped heath was historically separated from Cradley itself by the River Stour and the Mousesweet Brook As on other commons in the Black Country, cottages were built encroaching on the heath. These were occupied by nailmakers, amongst other industries.

Following the Norman Conquest, the manor passed through various hands, including the Earl of Wiltshire—who was beheaded during the Wars of the Roses—before being purchased by Sir Frank Lyttleton in 1564

One landmark in the growth of Cradley Heath as a distinct community was the creation of Cradley Heath Baptist Church, in December 1833. This was the first Christian Church meeting in Cradley Heath, and has the distinction of having the first Afro-Caribbean minister in Britain, Rev. George Cosens, in 1837.

=== Mining ===
Cradley Heath and the surrounding area lie on the South Staffordshire coalfield. Ordnance Survey maps surveyed in 1882 show the town to be surrounded by collieries.; the High Street still features a prominent dip, a visible reminder of a major mining subsidence event that occurred in 1914. Deaths from mining accidents were not unknown. In December 1839, four men were crushed when a coal mine roof collapsed underground; between two and three thousand mourners attended the funeral procession. In October 1844, ten men including the 'butty' (Note: 'Butty' is an informal term for the mine manager or contractor, who operated the mine on behalf of the owners.) plus a boy aged 12 died in a coal mine explosion, two horses working underground were also killed. Several ironstone miners working below the coal seam managed to escape, but a further three working horses could not be rescued. At the inquest it was reported that the mine had been inspected hours earlier, tested for sulphur gas and declared safe. Verdicts of accidental death were given.

=== Industry ===
From the introduction of machine-based nail-making around 1830, Cradley Heath developed two prolific industries – chainmaking and nailmaking – which would remain strong for decades afterwards. The area became world-famous for "hand-hammered" or "country-work" chain, often produced by women for use in agriculture and mining. Despite a lack of direct records, it is believed chains and collars were also produced here for export to the United States for the slave trade.

Among the metallurgical companies that were active in the area was the British Iron Company and its successor, the New British Iron Company, who operated a vast iron and steel works at Corngreaves from 1825 to 1894. The works expanded to include rivet and boiler shops and chain works; continuing under other owners until 1912. Innovation continued into the 20th century with the firm Samuel Woodhouse & Sons at the Eagle Works became the first British manufacturer to produce electrically welded chain It was only during the 1980s recession that the iron-working industries based in Cradley Heath began to decline.

Chain-making developed both as a cottage industry where outworkers produced smaller size chains in forges at the rear of their homes – women accounted for two-thirds of these workers – and in factories where both smaller and larger size chains were made. Much of the factory output of larger chain was for ship anchors. In 1903, Samuel Woodhouse & Sons at the Eagle Works on Corngreaves Road became the first British manufacturer of electrically welded chain. Over the summer of 1910, around one thousand local women led and organised by Mary Macarthur of the National Federation of Women Workers, and supported by the Chain Makers' and Strikers' Association were involved in a ten-week-long Chainmakers' Strike. The women successfully campaigned for the implementation of the minimum rate of pay set by the Chain Trade Board – effectively doubling their wages. The dispute ended on 22 October 1910 when the last of the employers agreed to pay the minimum wage. The triumphant strike led to the construction of The Cradley Heath Workers' Institute, built using surplus strike funds. Opened in 1912, the "Stute" served as a social and industrial hub for nearly a century By 1934 there were 68 chain-works and chain-shops in Cradley Heath; almost a third of the total for Great Britain. Numbers declined after the Second World War but some outworking continued into the 1950s. The papers of the Cradley Heath Chainmakers' Trade Union are housed at the University of Birmingham Special Collections.

The Workers' Institute, which stood in Lower High Street for almost 100 years, was rebuilt at the Black Country Living Museum in 2006, after being dismantled to make way for a bypass.

=== Media ===
Cradley Heath for a short while had a newspaper published in the town. The Cradley Heath and Stourbridge Observer was launched on 26 March 1864. The seven-column, four-page broadsheet was published by Thomas Homer of Five-Ways, Cradley Heath each Saturday. On Saturday, 4 June 1864 the masthead was changed to The Observer; Stourbridge, Cradley Heath, Halesowen and District Chronicle. The newspaper covered not only local news but national and international affairs too. A publisher based in High Street, Stourbridge had taken over by October 1864. The newspaper's title was changed to The Stourbridge Observer - Cradley Heath, Halesowen and District Chronicle on 6 October 1866 and published under that name until 30 June 1888.

The Royal Electric Theatre stood on Bank Street from 1913; it closed in 1988 and was demolished in 2006 to make way for a Tesco supermarket. The Majestic Cinema on Cradley Road opened in 1933 and was designed by Dudley architects, Webb and Gray in Art Deco style. The cinema closed 30 years later and like many others was converted into a bingo hall, which in turn closed in 2000. The Majestic had room for 1,500 people, stained glass windows with heraldic patterns at balcony level and a Christie organ. The appearance of the building has become rather shabby; the shop units are empty and it faces an uncertain future.

== Cradley Heath today ==
Cradley Heath High Street is marked by two road junctions, Four-Ways at the east end, and Five-Ways at the west end. Four-Ways is the most altered by the new bypass, running parallel to the High Street, with the Tesco store at this end. Cradley Heath remains a traditional shopping centre, offering an alternative to modern malls. It has two market halls and numerous privately owned shops and businesses. The old Market Hall has been in Cradley Heath for over 100 years. The Black Country Bugle newspaper was originally based in Cradley Heath but is now situated at the newly built Dudley Archives; the newspaper was set up by Derek Beasley, former chairman of Halesowen Harriers, which focuses on local history and culture of the Black Country and often features articles and poems written in the Black Country dialect. The town also has a local "hypothetical" flag for Cradley Heath features an arm with a hammer, referencing the local dialect cry "ommer um craderlee" (hammer them Cradley), a cry used to support the local speedway team

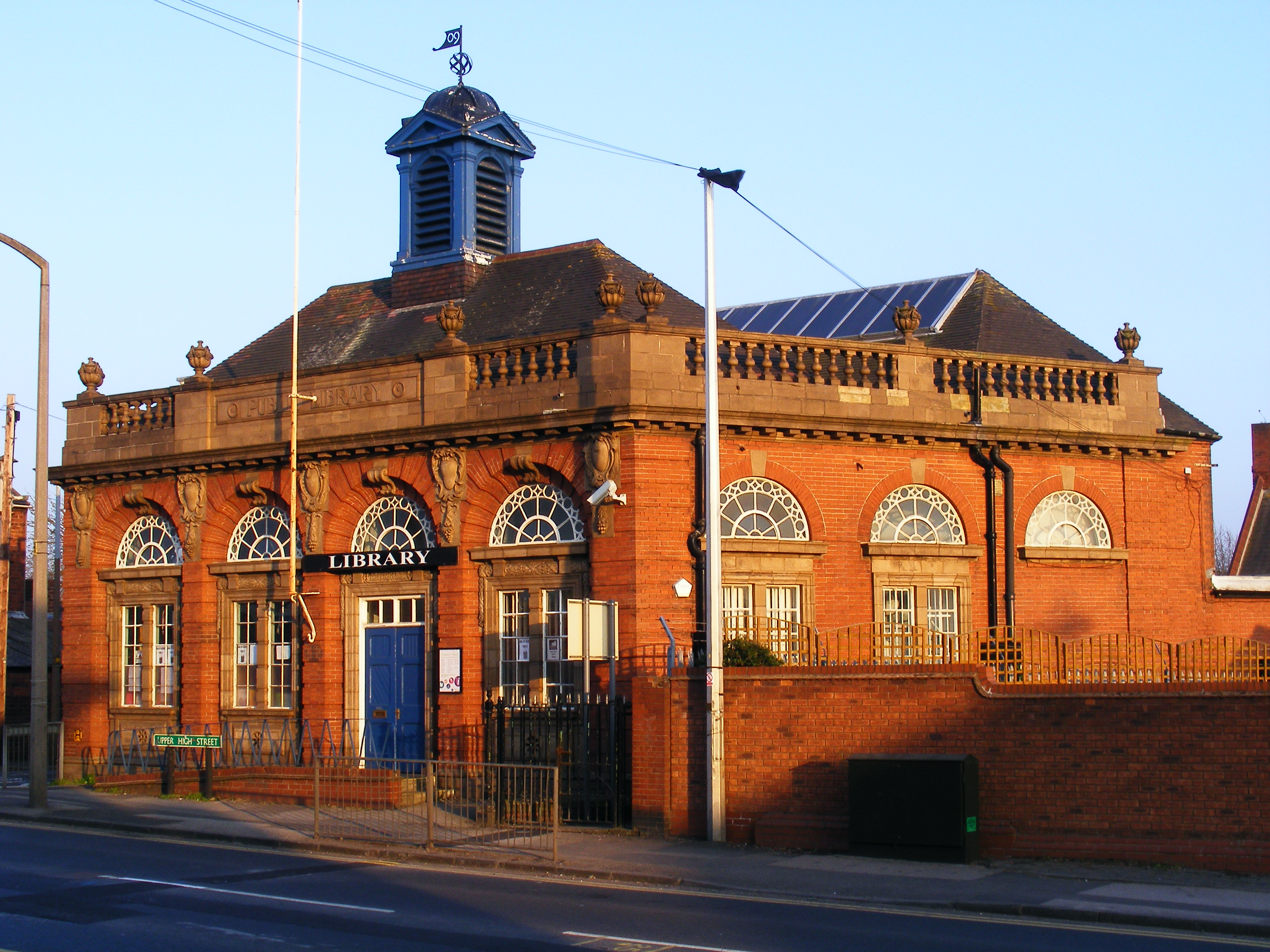
Cradley Heath Library, Upper High Street

Cradley Heath has two large municipal parks, Haden Hill Park, which contains Haden Hall and Haden Old Hall (the latter with Tudor origins) which was the ancestral home of the Haden family and the Mary McArthur Memorial Gardens (known locally as Lomey Town park). The town also features the Cradley Heath Carnegie Library, a Grade II listed building opened in 1909 and one of the few of its kind in the Black Country still functioning as a public library

An enterprise zone was developed in the deindustrialised eastern part of the town, near the border with Rowley Regis.

The Old Bank Building on Upper High Street which was built in 1908 for the United Counties Bank of Cradley Heath has kept its original place even with the new road layout with the modernisation of Cradley Heath. In 1973 the Old Bank Building became part of Sandwell Insurance and Sandwell Accountancy Services (SAS).

Cradley Heath High Street has not changed much since the subsidence in 1914 and the dip in the high street following the subsidence is very prominent and can be seen still today.

== Geography ==
A part of the West Midlands conurbation, Cradley Heath is located in the south of Sandwell Metropolitan Borough, 8 miles west of Birmingham, 2 miles (3 km) north-west of Halesowen and 3 miles (5 km) south of Dudley. It is situated in a low-lying area of the Black Country, south of the limestone ridge that runs through the area. The River Stour forms the southern boundary with Cradley, and the Mousesweet Brook, a tributary of the Stour, forms part of the boundary between the metropolitan boroughs of Sandwell and Dudley.

=== Areas ===
- Lomey Town
- Newtown
- Plant's Green
- Surfeit Hill
- Timbertree

== Governance ==
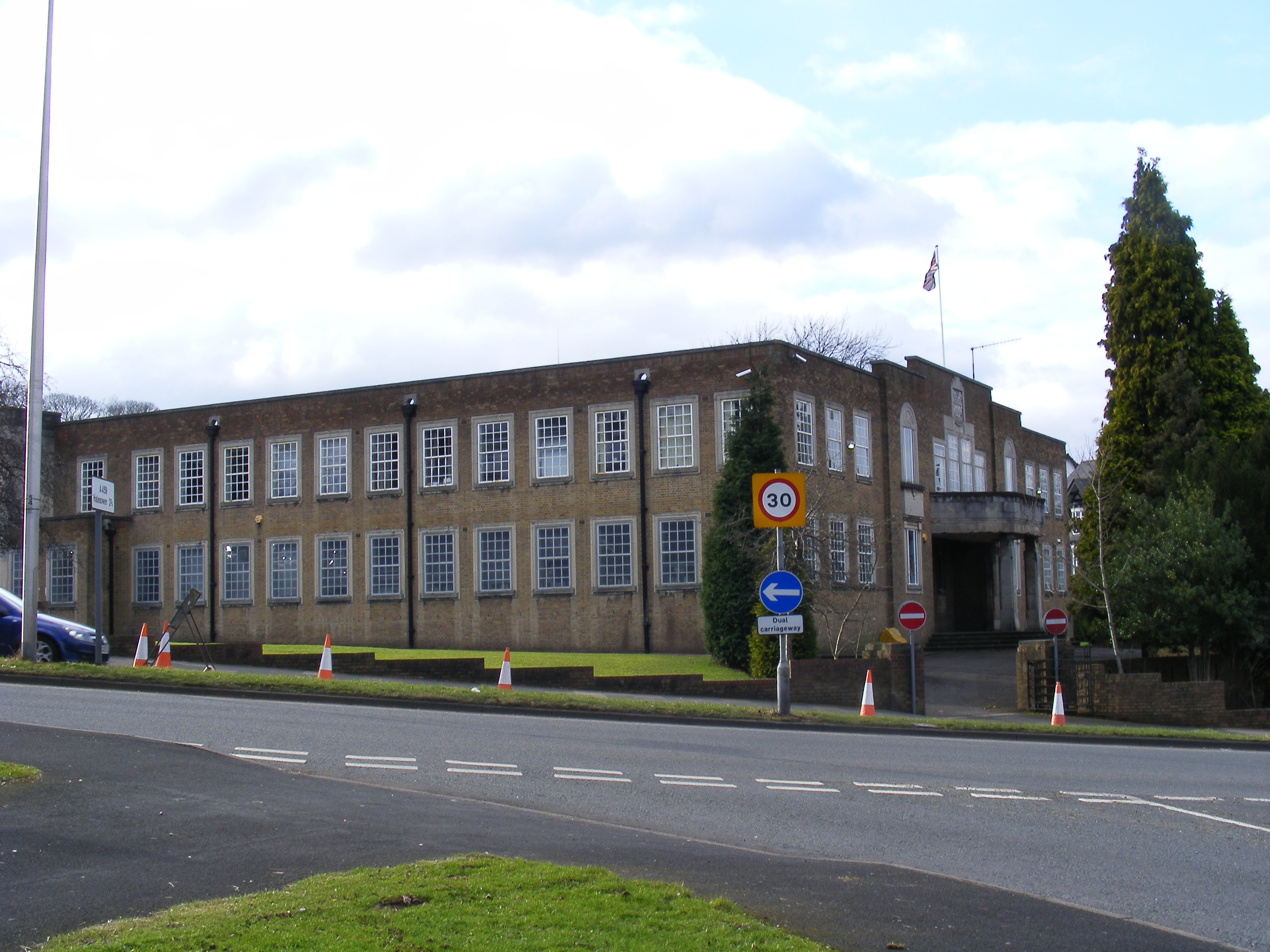
Former Rowley Regis Municipal Building, demolished in 2012.

Cradley Heath is part of the Cradley Heath and Old Hill ward which is represented by three councillors on Sandwell Borough Council.

Cradley Heath was formerly a part of the Rowley Regis Municipal Borough, with the council house situated in Old Hill. Following the abolition of the borough in 1966, until 1974, Cradley Heath was part of the County Borough of Warley, and therefore part of Worcestershire.

The council house remained in use as offices by Sandwell Council until 2012, when it was demolished to make way for the construction of a new fire station.

== Education ==
Sandwell Council is the local education authority for Cradley Heath, and is responsible for maintaining all the schools in the area.

The local secondary school, Ormiston Forge Academy, is situated in Wright's Lane, Old Hill, and has served the area since the 1960s. Other nearby secondary schools are located outside the town in the Dudley Borough, in neighbouring Netherton and Halesowen. There are several primary schools in Cradley Heath. Corngreaves Academy on Plant Street claims to be the oldest school in Sandwell Borough, with roots back to 1848-49 and the British Iron Company.

== Places of worship ==
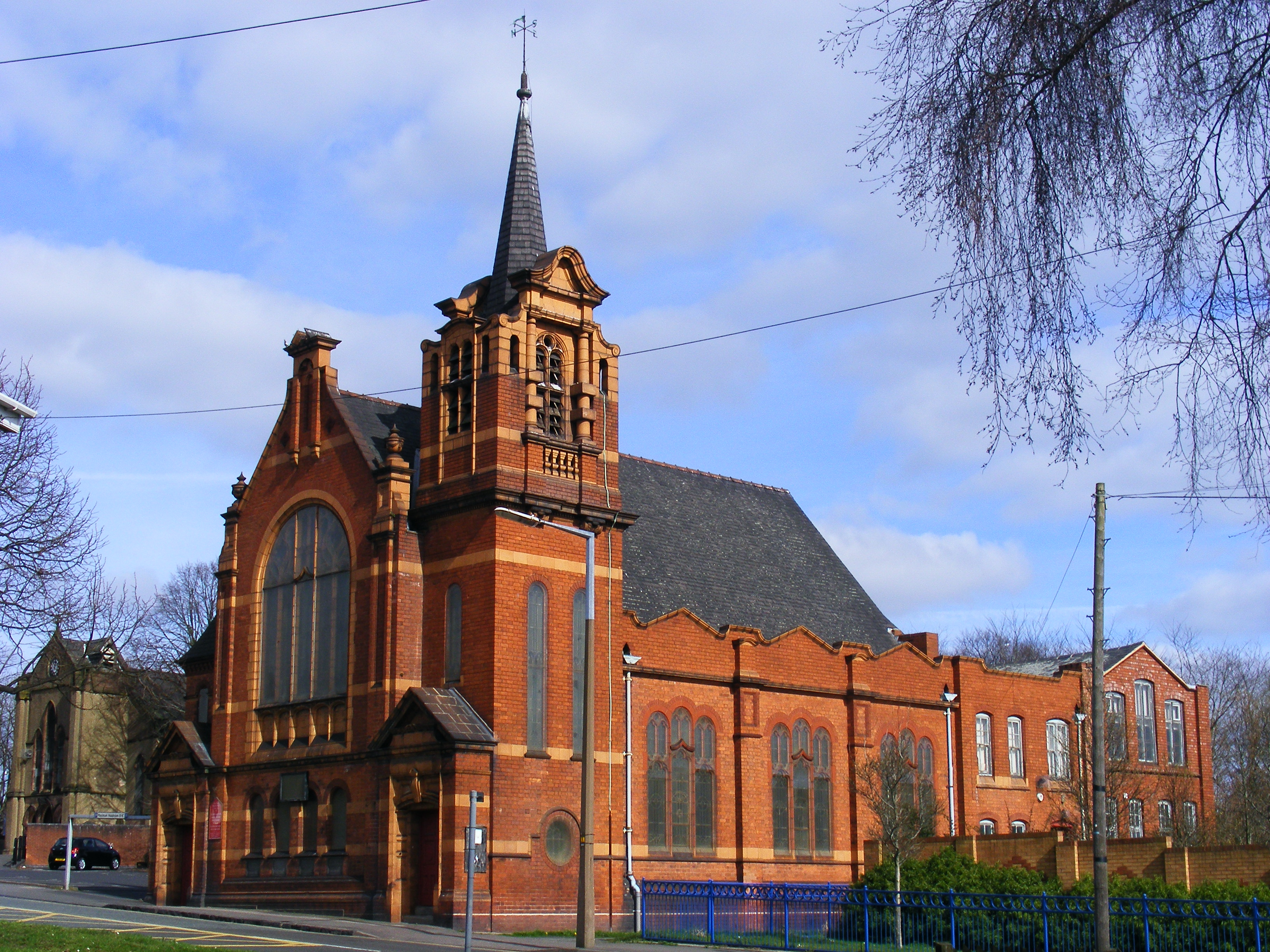
Cradley Heath Baptist Church

The religious landscape was shaped by a 19th-century move toward Non-conformist worship. The first Methodist meetings were held in a nailor's shop in Tibbetts Gardens in 1821. Baptist chapels became particularly popular among the working class due to their plain language and the hymns of Ira D. Sankey The nearest Anglican churches are St John's on St Anne's/Dudley Wood Road and Holy Trinity, Old Hill. Four-Ways Baptist Church stands on Corngreaves Road. The Cradley Heath Central Mosque on Plant Street opened in 2016. A number of Methodist churches in the Old Hill area amalgamated and formed a new congregation in Lawrence Lane. St James' Wesleyan Reform Union Chapel relocated from Cradley Heath to Old Hill when the bypass was constructed. One should also note the Salvation Army Citadel, which was established in the town in 1893.

The Kingdom Hall of Jehovah's Witnesses can be found opposite the Holy Trinity Church in Old Hill.

There are several Strict and Particular Baptist Churches, including Spring Meadow and Station Road, both in Old Hill.

=== Former ===
St Luke's stood at Four-Ways, Cradley Heath from 1847 until its demolition in 2016. The churchyard remains.

Grainger's Lane Methodist Church closed in 2004, and was later demolished.

== Transport ==
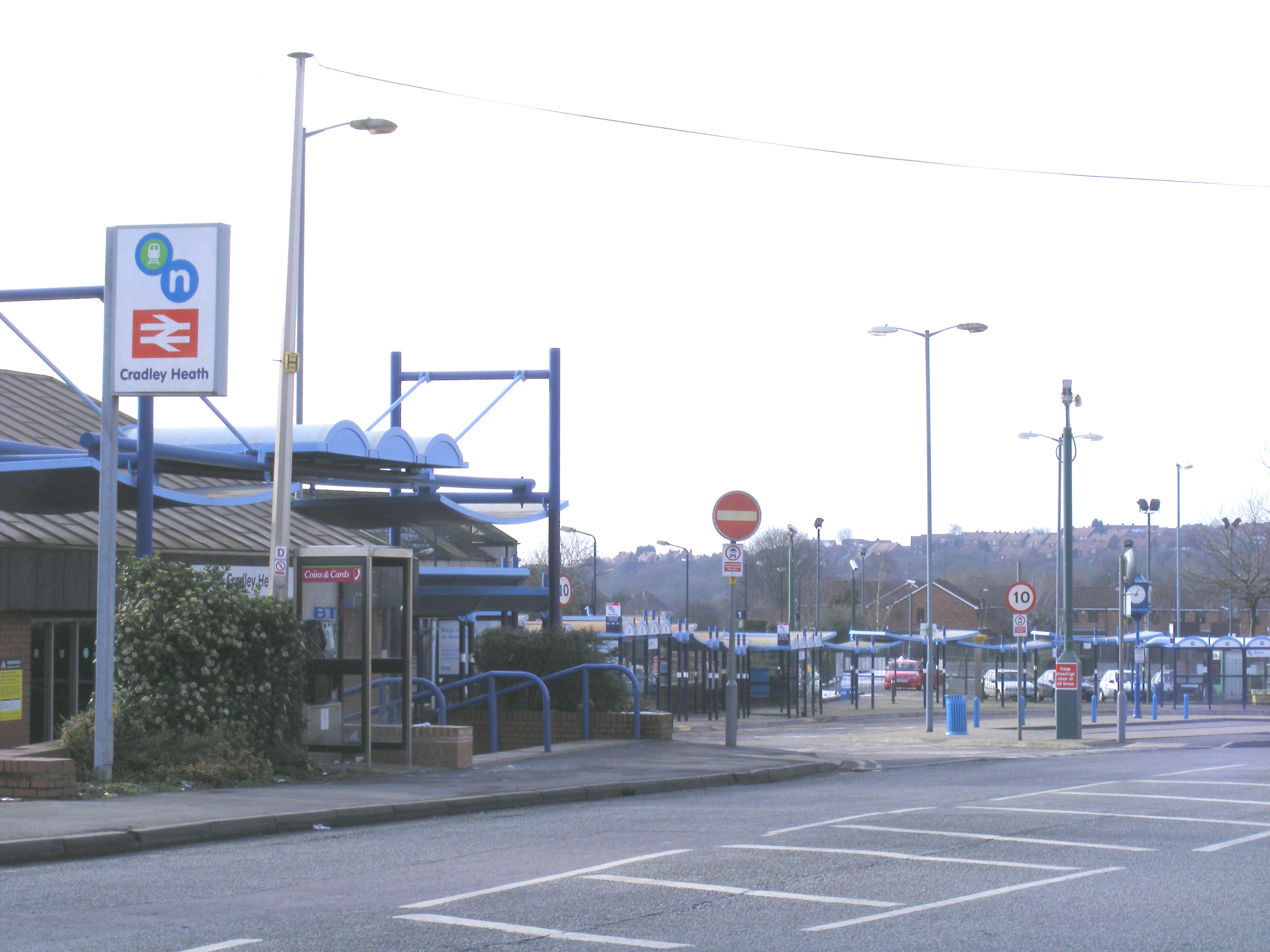
Cradley Heath Interchange

Cradley Heath railway station and the adjacent bus station form the Cradley Heath Interchange. The station is on the Birmingham to Worcester line, with regular services between the two. Bus services run to Birmingham, Dudley, Halesowen, the Merry Hill Shopping Centre, Walsall and West Bromwich.

== Sport ==
The town was home to the Cradley Heath Heathens speedway team, which participated in British speedway from 1947 until 1995. The team was originally known as Cradley United and the Cradley Heath Cubs before the "Heathens" name became synonymous with the club. The club's heyday was in the 1980s when World Champion riders such as Erik Gundersen and Bruce Penhall were team members. The speedway track was in Dudley Wood, just north of the town. The stadium was closed and the land redeveloped for housing in the mid-1990s, but is remembered in the names Stadium Drive and Racemeadow Crescent.

== Parks and leisure facilities ==
The main parkland is Haden Hill Park, the former home of the Haden family and now in the care of Sandwell MBC. Alongside Haden Hill House are Haden Hill Leisure Centre, housing a swimming pool and other facilities, and Old Hill Cricket Club.

Bearmore Playing Field off Bearmore Road is laid out on the site of Bearmore Colliery.

Codsall Coppice Local Nature Reserve between Codsall Road and Trejon Road comprises 5 acres (2 ha) of mature, mainly oak woodland. Mousesweet Brook Local Nature Reserve, which adjoins Saltwells Local Nature Reserve, consists of woodland, grassland and a pool.

The Cradley Heath Liberal Club has substantial facilities on Upper High Street, just east of Four-Ways. The Regis Restaurant, Old Hill, was for many years a community hall but the future has been in doubt after Sandwell MBC found it uneconomic.

Voices in Harmony, a local choir, originated in Cradley Heath as "Sandwell Community Choir" to perform Handel's The Messiah in October 1997 as part of the BT "Voices For Hospices" event.

It is host to an annual festival over the last few years called Cradley Women Chainmakers' Festival.

== Notable people ==
- Noah Hingley (1796–1877), industrialist, made chain in Cradley; founded the firm N. Hingley & Sons Ltd in 1838; he became Mayor of Dudley in 1869
- Josie Lawrence (born 1959 in Old Hill), stage, film and TV actress and comedian, brought up locally
- Annie O. Tibbits (1871–1957), author
- Tim Tolkien (born 1962), sculptor who has designed several monumental sculptures

=== Sport ===
- Billy Morgan (1891 in Old Hill – after 1927), footballer who played 189 games
- Joe Tate (1904 in Old Hill – 1973), footballer who played 180 games for Aston Villa and 3 for England
- Jack Lane (1898–1984), footballer who played 356 games, including 216 for Brentford
- Jack Boxley (1931–2016), footballer who played 297 games including 193 for Bristol City
- Jason Lowe (born 1972), professional darts player, plays in the Professional Darts Corporation
