= 1905 Kingswinford by-election =

UK parliamentary by-election

The 1905 Kingswinford by-election was a parliamentary by-election for the UK House of Commons constituency of Kingswinford, Staffordshire held on 3 July 1905.

It was triggered by the death of incumbent MP William George Webb. It was won by Conservative Henry Staveley-Hill.

== Result ==
1905 Kingswinford by-election
Party	Candidate	Votes	%	±%
Conservative	Henry Staveley-Hill	5,490	52.9	N/A
Liberal	Edward Marten Dunne	4,887	47.1	New
Majority		603	5.8	N/A
Turnout		10,377	78.0	N/A
Registered electors		13,301		
Conservative hold		Swing	N/A	
