= Cradley Heath Baptist Church =

Church in Sandwell, West Midlands, England

Coordinates: 52.47302°N 2.07908°W

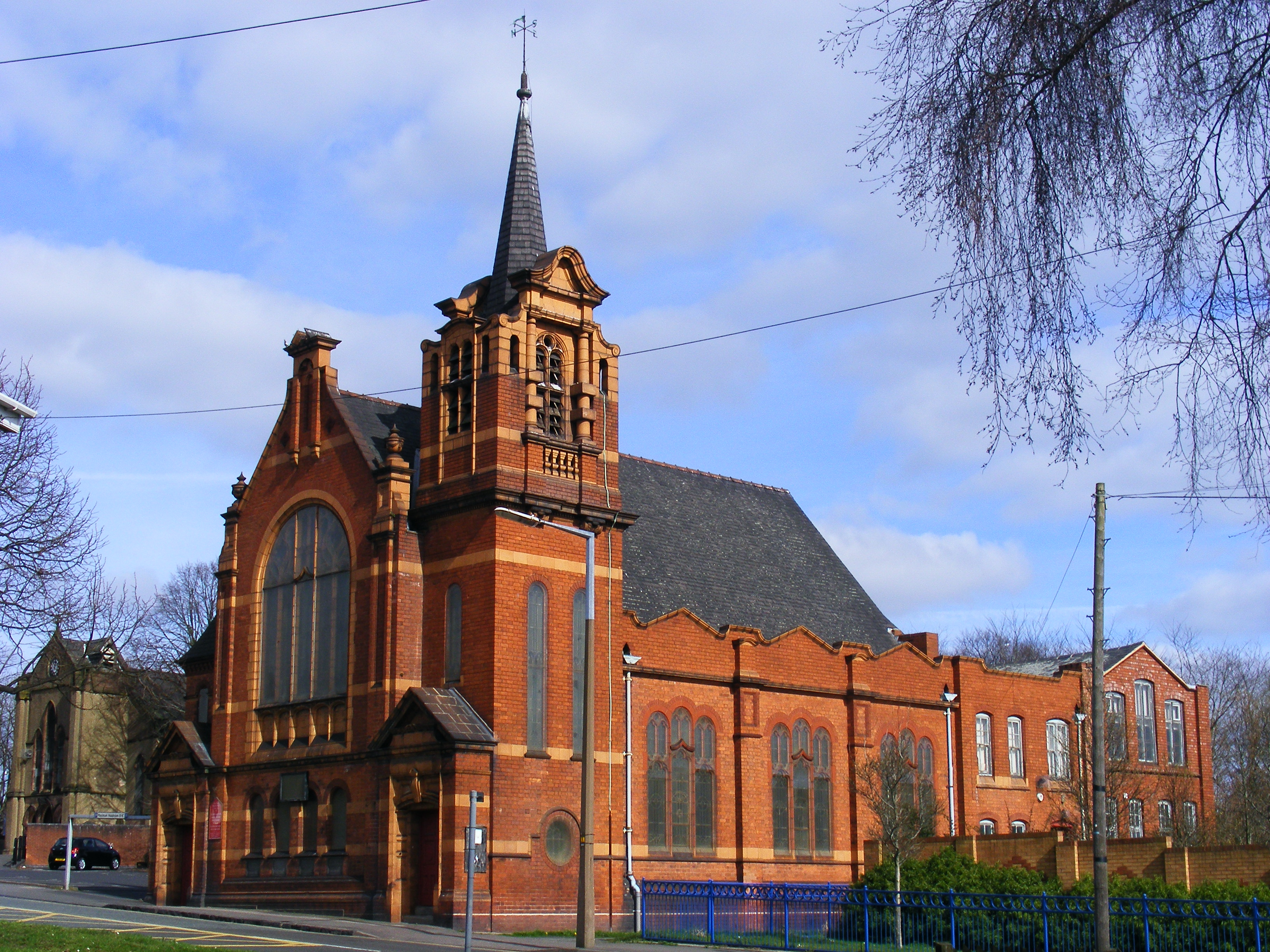
Cradley Heath Baptist Church. The front of the old building may be seen to the right, while St Luke's Church is behind to the left.

Cradley Heath Baptist Church, also known as Four-ways Baptist Church, was the first Church of any denomination to build a chapel in Cradley Heath, West Midlands. The first meeting was in December 1833, in Grainger's Lane. Later, land was bought near the Four-Ways end of the High Street, and a meeting place was built. The site was expanded, and two further buildings were built, the last in 1904.

The church building is Grade II listed.

The church is noted for appointing Britain's first recorded black West Indian pastor, Rev. George Cosens (or Cousens), in 1837.

== Origins ==
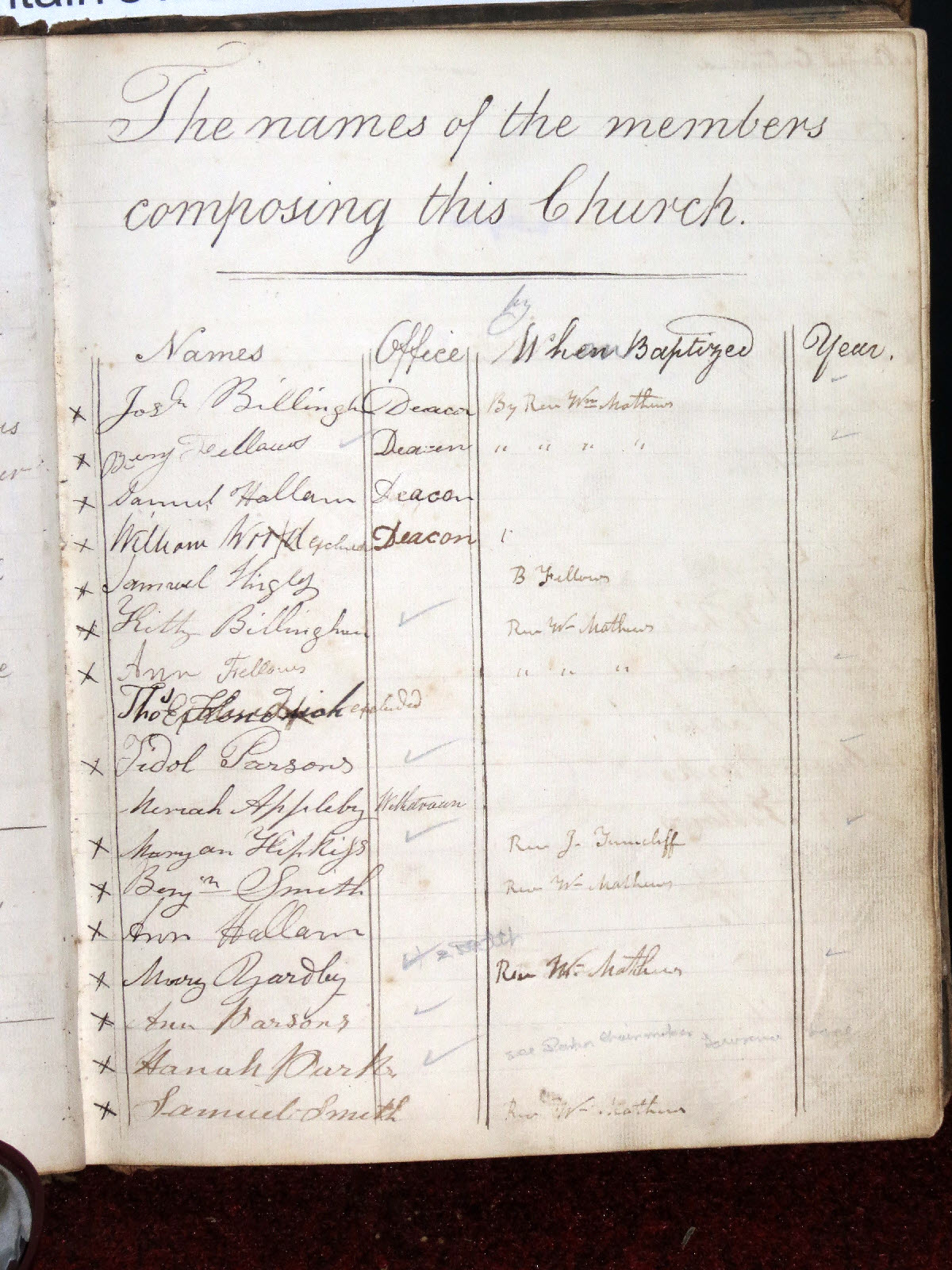
Church Book showing signatures of the first members, on Sunday 23 December 1833, according to Baptist practice of a covenant to uphold the constitution and practice of the church as written on the preceding pages.

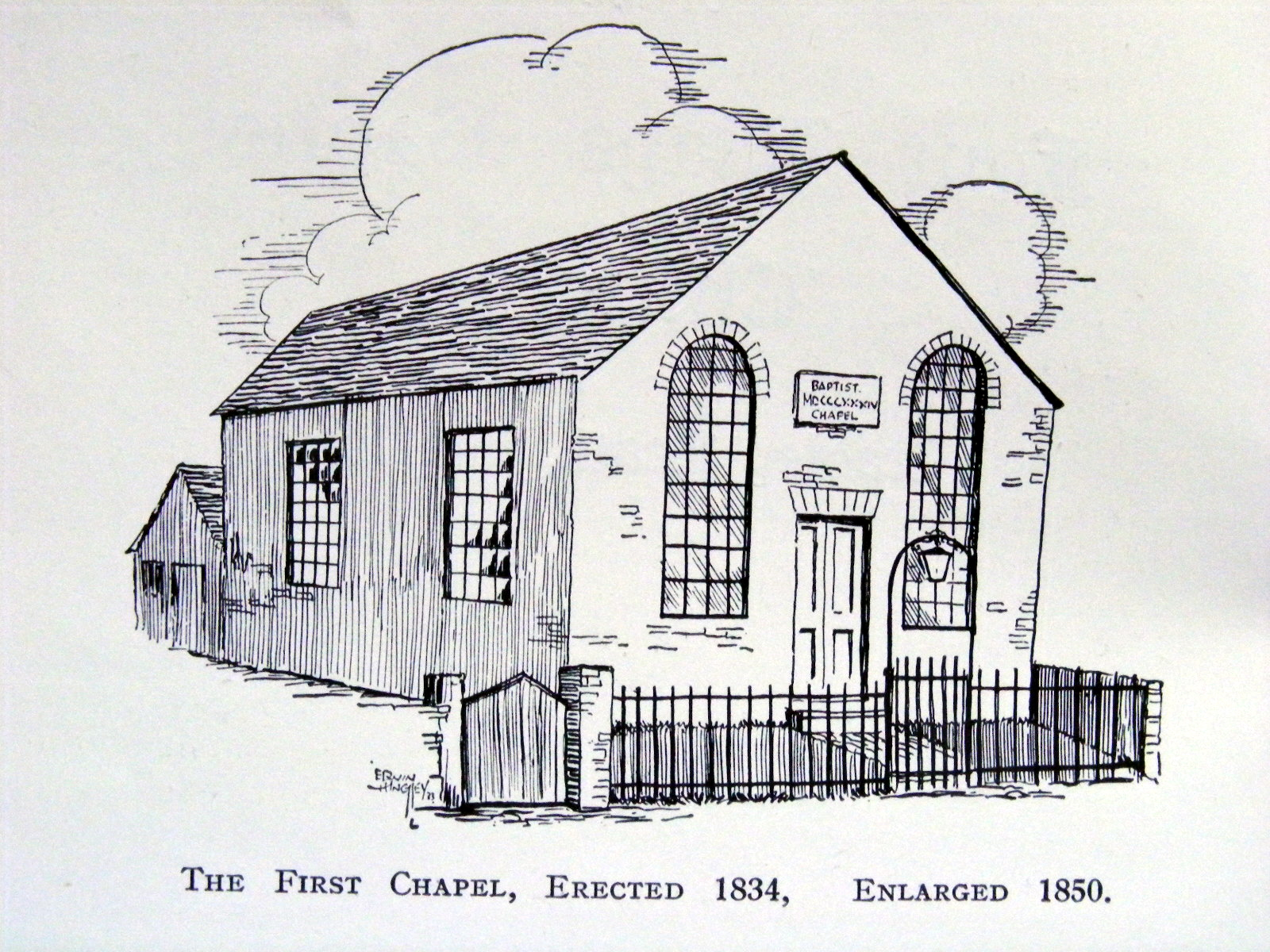
The 1834 building, sketched from memory after the extension was built.

Cradley Heath Baptist Church began as an offshoot of Cradley Baptist Church in 1833. The Minister, Rev. Jabez Tunnicliff, read a verse from the Bible which challenged his theology. He paused so long in his sermon that some of the officers thought he was ill. He continued the sermon, but began Bible study which led him to part, amicably, with Cradley Baptist Church. A total of 34 others (though one returned) left with him that year. In December 1833 they began to meet and formed a new Church. Other people, from Cradley Heath, joined them at such a rate that in 1834 they had to build a substantial chapel. This first building was enlarged in 1850 by adding a gallery on the ground within the iron railings fence shown in the sketch of the first building. This is the side entrance as shown on the right hand side of the photograph.

=== Deacons ===
Of the original 4 deacons, church officers responsible for practical administration, two deserve mention. Benjamin Fellows also served as a lay preacher, and performed baptisms. This is usually done by the Minister, but Mr Fellows officiated at two baptism services during 1838 when George Cosens was the minister. This may have been for practical reasons. Until a baptistry inside the building had been provided, baptisms were often carried out in "the cut" – a branch of a local canal.

Samuel Hallam, with his wife Ann, were not local to Cradley Heath. They were milliners, and had shops in Stourbridge, then Dudley, and finally in Birmingham before emigrating to Canada. Samuel came from Cromford, Ann from Sheffield, and they married in Tamworth. Jabez Tunnicliff's wife, Mary, was in the same trade, and probably worked in the Hallam's shop. Before joining the new Cradley Heath Baptist Church, Samuel had been a Deacon in the Baptist Church in Stourbridge. He served as secretary and treasurer in the Sunday School until 1841.

=== Particular and General Baptists ===
An explanation is needed of the doctrinal issue which led Tunnicliff to leave Cradley Baptist Church. British Baptists form two main groups according to one specific point of Protestant doctrine. This concerns Calvinism, which teaches that the work of Christ was not for everyone, but only for a few, the "elect". The theological term here is Particular atonement. Related to this is a concept that the elect are "born-again" by a work of God, which John Calvin thought to have happened to him when he was baptised as a baby by an Augustinian friar. This enables them to believe when they hear the gospel. Related to this is another concept, "Irresistible Grace", which teaches that the "elect" cannot resist the call of God, and that the "non-elect" cannot respond to it.

The General Baptists follow Arminian theology, in that the work of Christ was for all, but not everyone believes and benefits from it. Being "born again" is a work of God which follows believing in Jesus Christ. But believing is not something one can do unaided. Conversion begins with a work of God to call, and to awaken to hear the call, and to give the faith with which one believes. But in contrast to Calvinism, the call of God is not irresistible, but people still have the freedom to refuse. In many respects, however, as expressions of Protestant thinking in the 16th century, Arminianism and Calvinism have much in common and are like brothers from the same family.

The challenge to Tunnicliff's theology began with a challenge to the determinism implied by "Irresistible Grace". This led to his finding from Bible study that he considered that the General Baptist doctrines were right, and that he could no longer, with good conscience, continue to be salaried by a Particular Baptist congregation.

== History ==
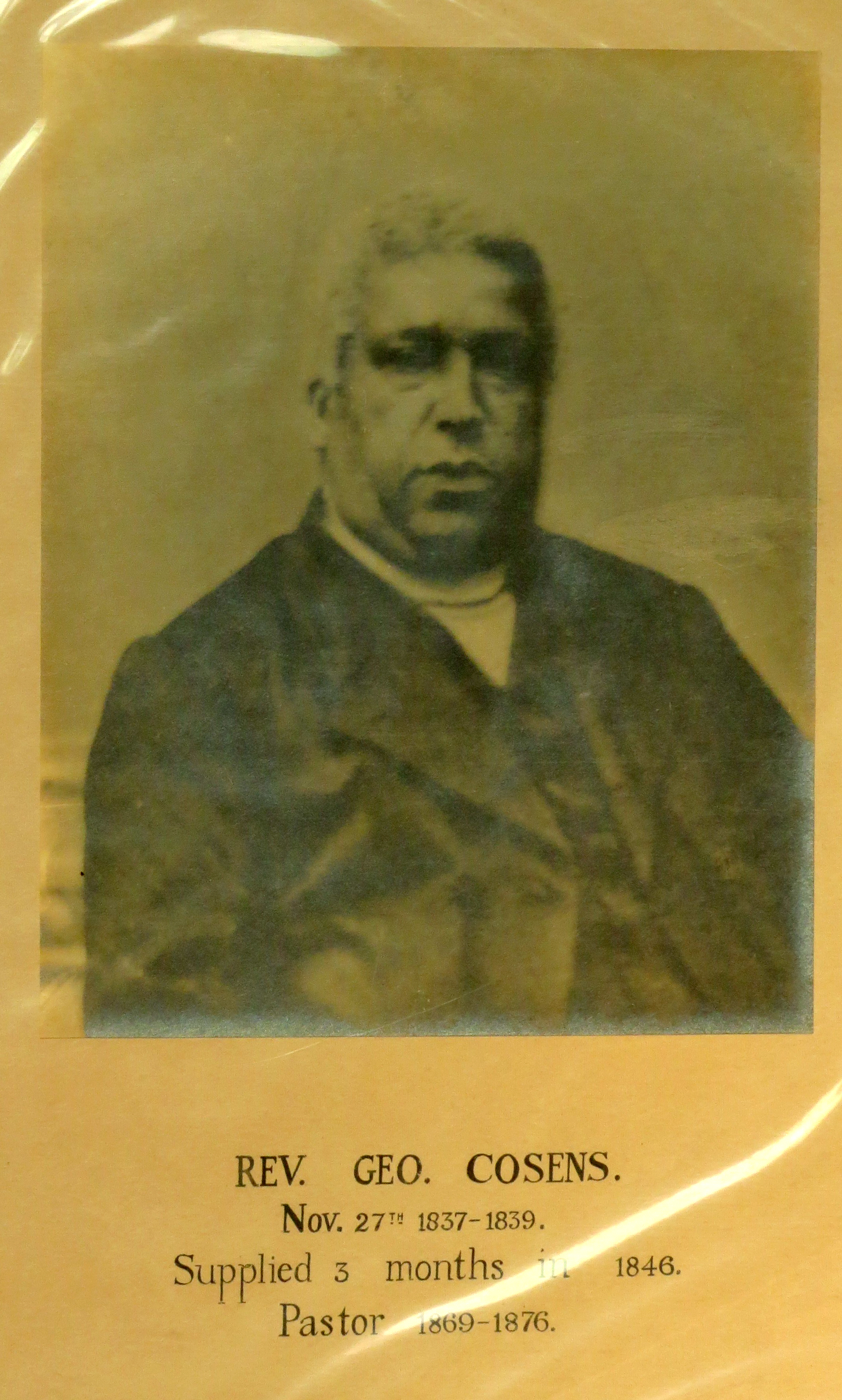
Rev. George Cosens in 1876

Although the Baptists were first to build a chapel in Cradley Heath, Primitive Methodists met in homes and workshops, from about 1820, but did not build until 1841. Some headlines in the history of Cradley Heath Baptist Church relate to the Ministers and others involved there.

=== Rev. George Cosens, first black minister ===
Cradley Heath Baptist Church is notable for having had the first Afro-Caribbean Minister in the Black Country, said to be the first known in Britain. In 1837, Rev. George Cosens was called to be minister. He was very popular, and served in various other churches in the area. His first time there was from 1837 to 1839. But he later served at Cradley Heath Baptist Church from 1869 to 1879. His second term was very successful at first, but later the health problems of old age were such that he was to be asked to resign. A meeting of the Deacons of the Church held on 2 June 1879 accepted his resignation. He moved to a less onerous pastorate at Brierley Hill.

Born in 1805 He was said to have come from Jamaica to study in a London college. In 1823, he was converted to Christianity while he and another student spent some free time in a church. He was disowned by his family, but clung to his Christian faith. He never returned to his native Jamaica, but served various churches as their pastor. His first church activity was with the Primitive Methodists from 1824. In May 1830 he married Mary Burnett, who died in June 1831 In 1832, he was sent by the Sunderland Circuit to the Norman Isles. Extracts from his journal published in the Primitive Methodist Magazine show 6 months successful work in Jersey and Gurnsey. But Kendall in his 1906 history says Cosens had to be recalled after being fined for tactless comments about young people in his audience. During mission work with John Nelson in Weymouth he left the Primitive Methodists after a disagreement, and joined the Baptists. His first appointment with the Baptists was as an assistant pastor at the New Connexion General Baptist Church at Aylesbury in 1837. His first pastorate at Cradley Heath began in November 1837.

Cosens died in 1881, and was buried in the cemetery of Brierley Hill Baptist Church (DY5 2RR) where he was then the Minister. The life of George Cosens is becoming celebrated in Britain's black community.

The variant spelling George Cousens is found in the 1933 Centenary Souvenir history by Rev. Idris Williams. The spelling Cosens is found in the minutes in the Secretary's Book from 1876 to 1889 and on the inscription on the 1876 photograph.

== Buildings ==
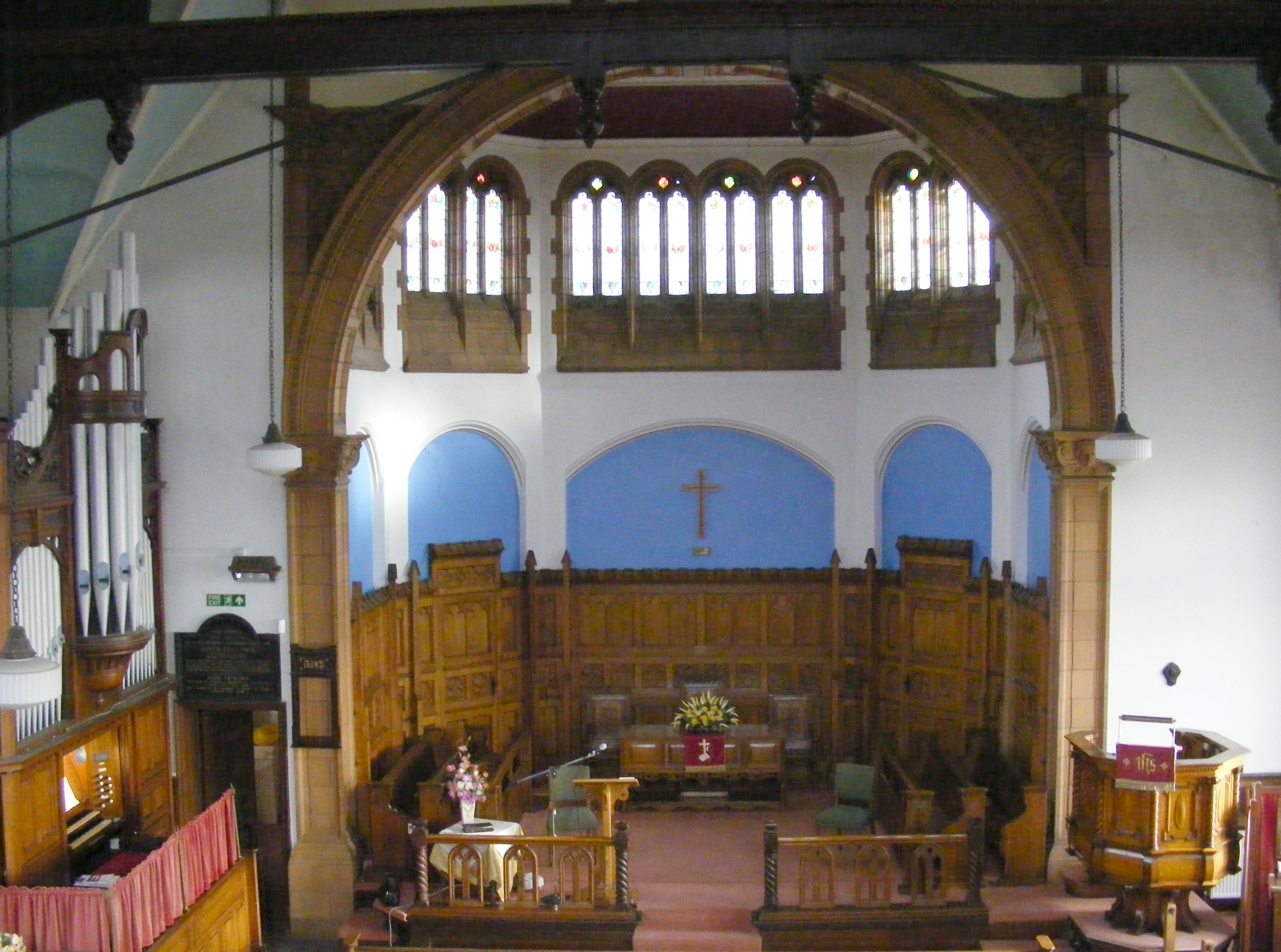
Interior of Cradley Heath Baptist Church, 1904 building.

The first meeting place, after Tunnicliff's own home, was on 23 December 1833, "the wheelwright's smithy" near Five-Ways. This has been identified as in the yard of Heath Cottage, Grainger's Lane.

In September 1834, they bought a piece of ground in the "Quarry Piece", Cradley Heath. The first building was erected in December 1834, "a fine new chapel seated for about 300". It was on the site of most of the present schoolroom. The gallery was added later. This extension is at the right-hand side of the above photograph. Neighbouring St Luke's Church was built in 1847.

The present main building was opened in December 1904. It is a substantial brick building with a spire and ornaments both inside and outside. A two-manual plus pedals pipe organ adorns one side.

The original chapel now serves as the schoolroom and hall. At various times in cold winters, the congregation have returned to the old building.

In the 1987, Sandwell Council made it a Grade II Listed Building, as being a significant landmark.

== The present day ==
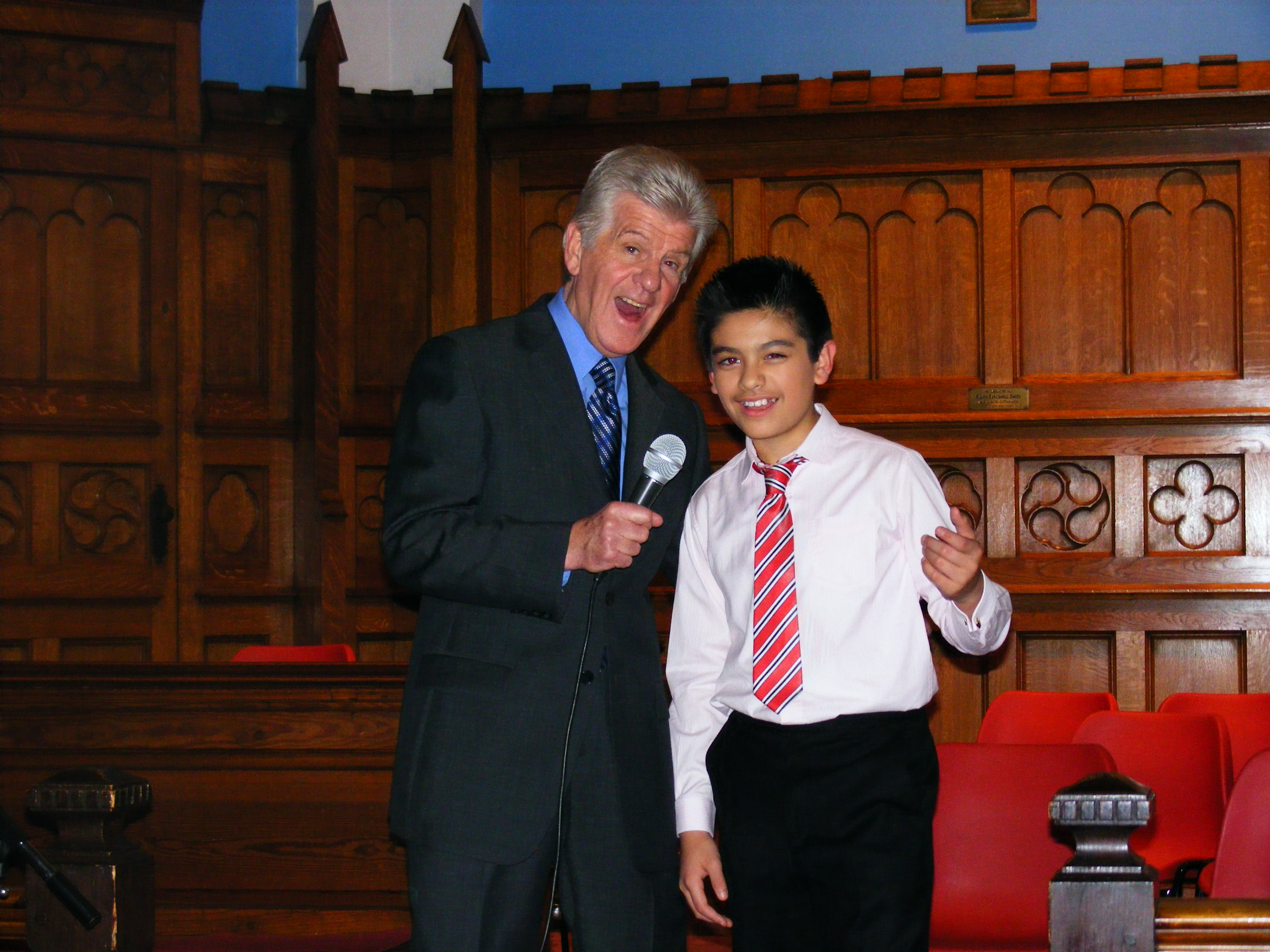
Charlie and Roger Green at the Christmas Spectacular 2009

In spite of dwindling numbers, the congregation has continued to meet. During 2007, the question of continuing in the present building was discussed. After much debate, it was decided to continue. The 175th Anniversary was celebrated in December 2008.

As well as the Sunday morning meeting, Cradley Heath Baptist Church is involved in providing for the needs of people in local nursing homes who cannot get to a place of worship. There is also a short open-air meeting for hymn singing on some Saturdays, sometimes in the market, or on other open spaces just before Christmas.

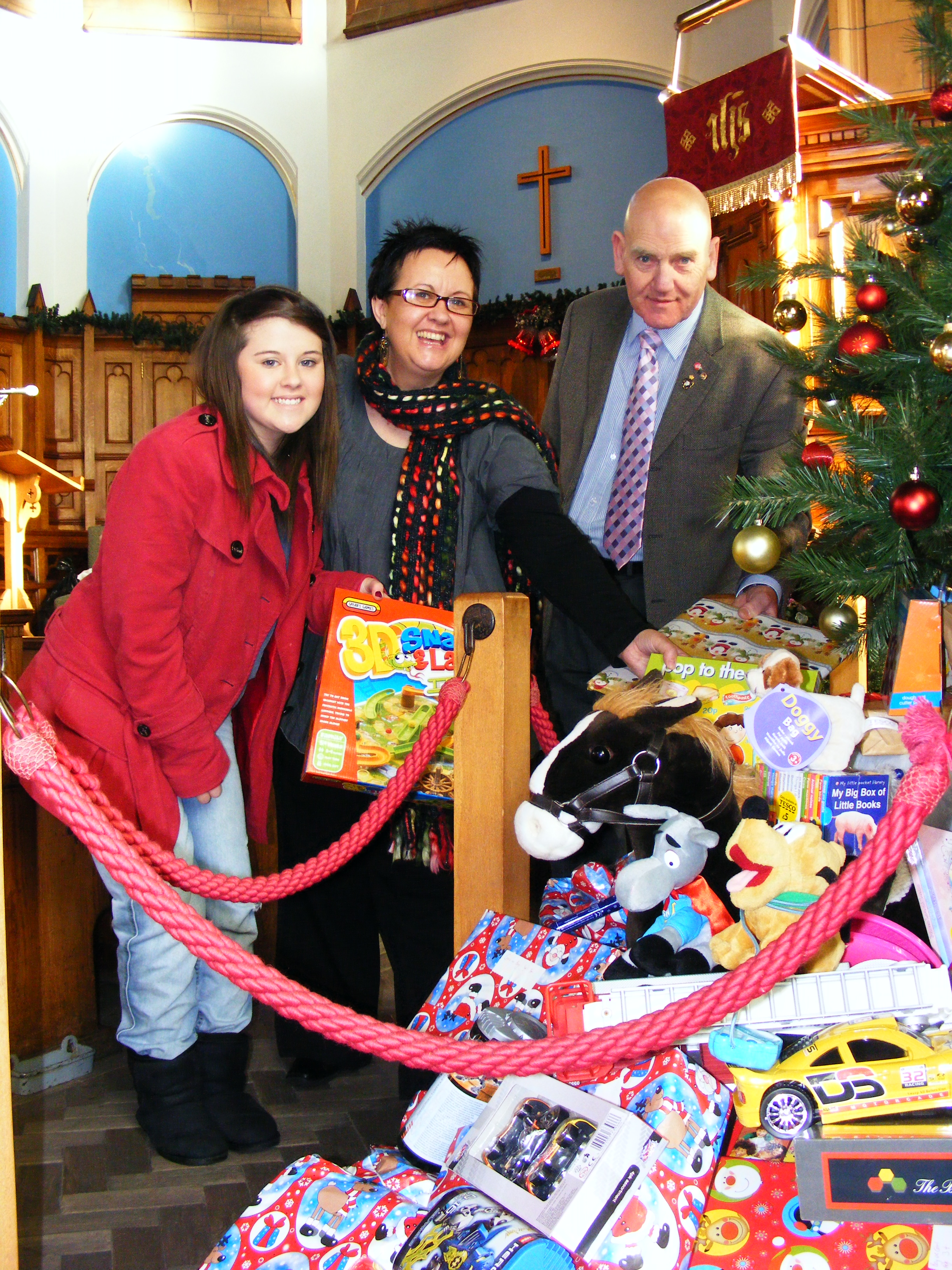
Toy collection donated to Mrs Anna Hartland of local charity Loaves 'N' Fishes

Community activities include a "Toddlers Group" on Friday mornings, and a gardening club on the first Thursday evening of the month. The Cradley Heath Flower & Gardening Club was originally planned for the summer of 2009, but is so popular that it continues to meet during the winter. On 5 November 2009, the Special Demonstrator at the club's Open Evening was Andrew Lloyd, Florist from Stourbridge. He is the NAFAS Area Chairman for Three Counties & South Wales and has been in the Floristry Business for 27 years. He presented 'A Floral Sparkler' and it was a sell-out event, with an audience of nearly 90 people.

The Christmas activities in December 2009 included a "Christmas Spectacular" concert featuring children from nearby Springfield Primary School and a special guest appearance from international rising star Charlie Green, a semi-finalist on "Britain's Got Talent" in 2008. 250 tickets were sold to raise funds for urgent repairs to this listed building.

The Church is involved in an annual Christmas toy collection. In 2010, this was donated to local charity Loaves 'N' Fishes to provide toys to needy children. The collection was boosted by the generosity of the people of Cradley Heath through the local Tesco's supermarket which kindly provided a collection point.

During the winter of 2009–2010, the church building suffered from thieves taking lead from the roof. This was at about the same time as lead was taken, twice, from the roof of the nearby public library building, and from a number of private houses. The church building suffered from significant amounts of water leaking in. The pipe organ alone required repairs estimated at £4,000

During the first quarter of 2011, a disabled standard toilet was built in the Choir Vestry, as part of upgrading the building to 21st-century standards. Being a listed building, the construction had to be such that the original building features were not damaged. A grant application to English Heritage was made during 2010. The building was judged to be of sufficient historical interest that a grant of £106,000 was awarded in March 2011, leaving an estimated £60,000 to be found to cover major building repairs including dry rot damage and the first replacement roof on the original 19th-century building.

The first phase of general renovation took place during the first 6 months of 2013. This repaired the front (west end) and north side of the 1904 building, including replacement of ornamental terra-cotta features, and the floor on the north side.

== Photographs ==
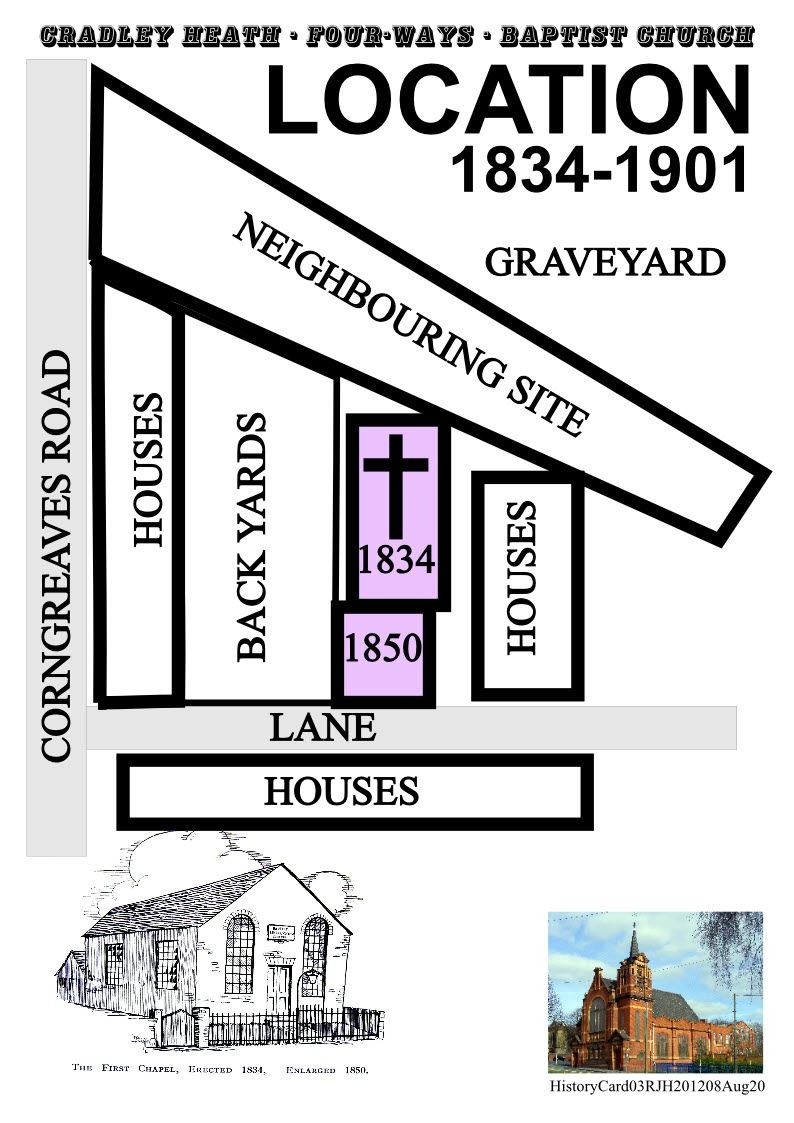
Situation of buildings in the 19th century showing the original 1834 building and the 1850 extension.

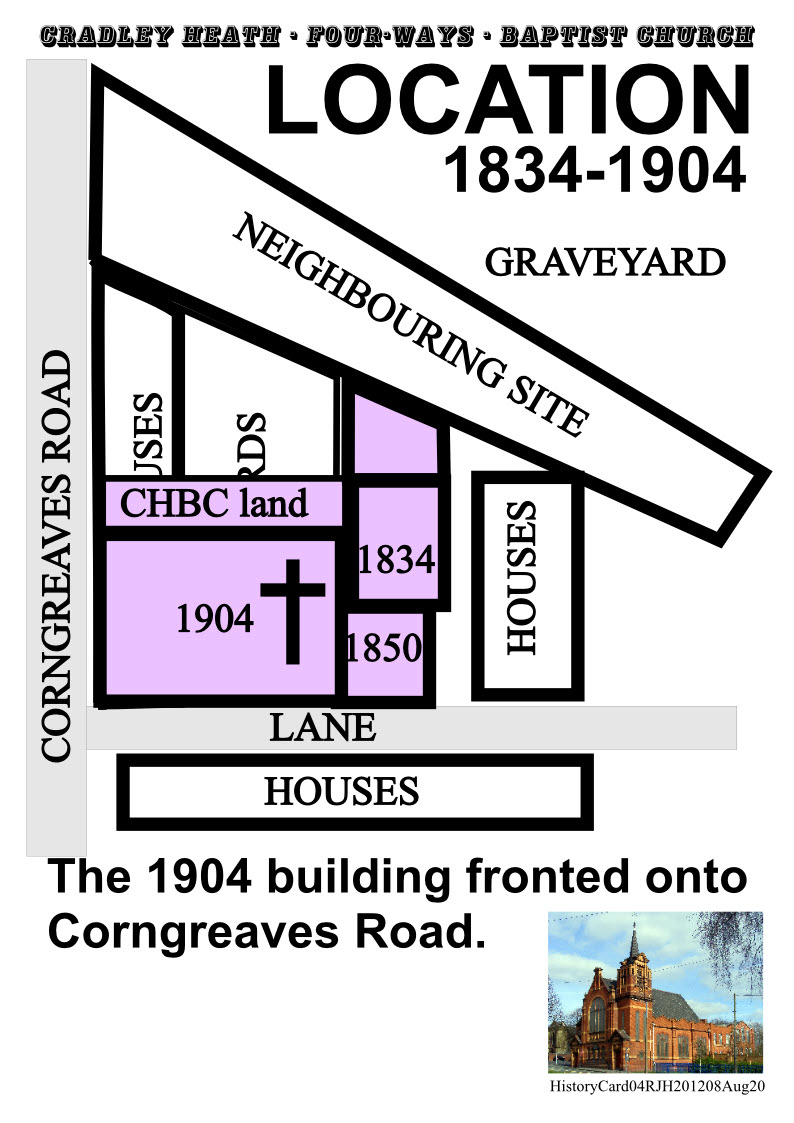
Situation of buildings showing the 1904 extension which is the main building today.

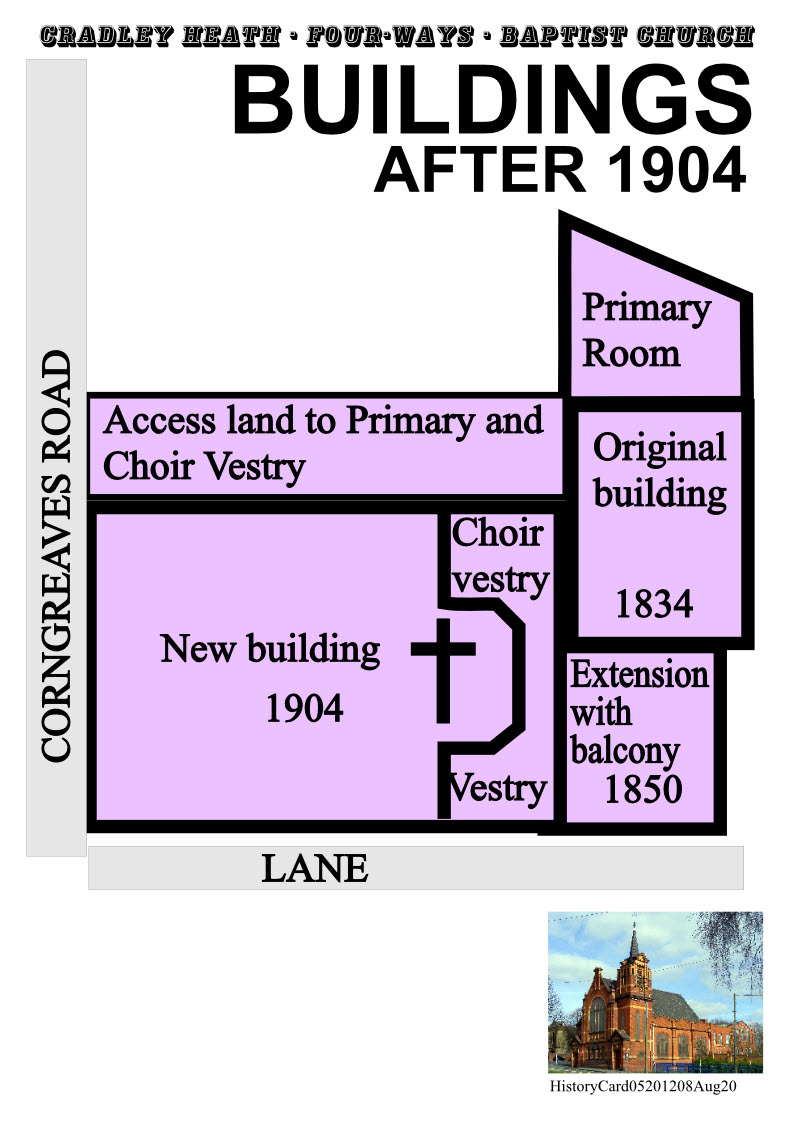
More detail of the buildings after the construction of the 1904 building. The access on the north side is shown in the 1903 architect's drawings as sloping down to Choir Vestry floor level. Although shown on the Land Registry as part of the Baptist Church land, this was absorbed into the car park when the Council demolished the remaining houses in the early 1980s.

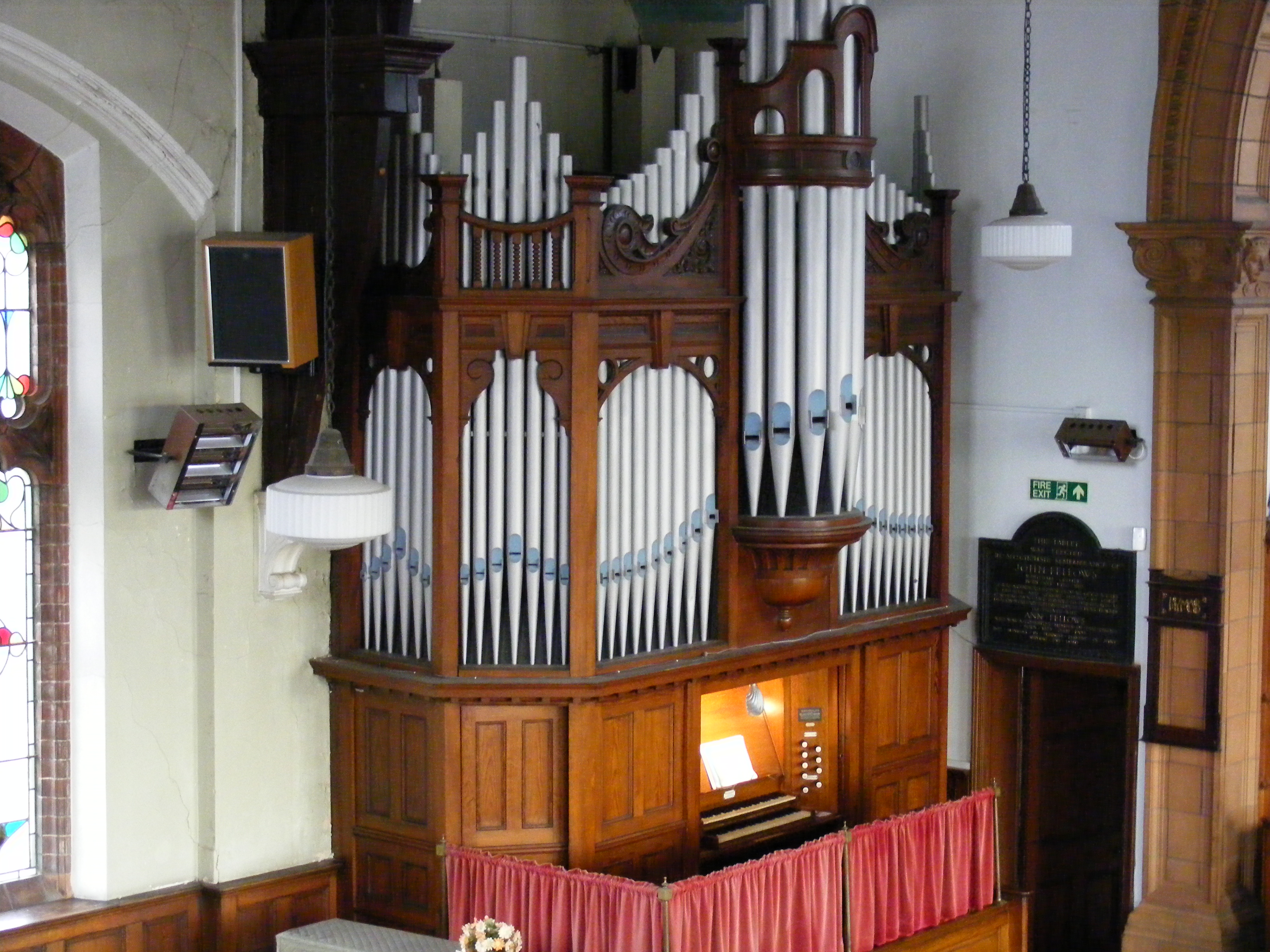
Pipe organ in Cradley Heath Baptist Church.

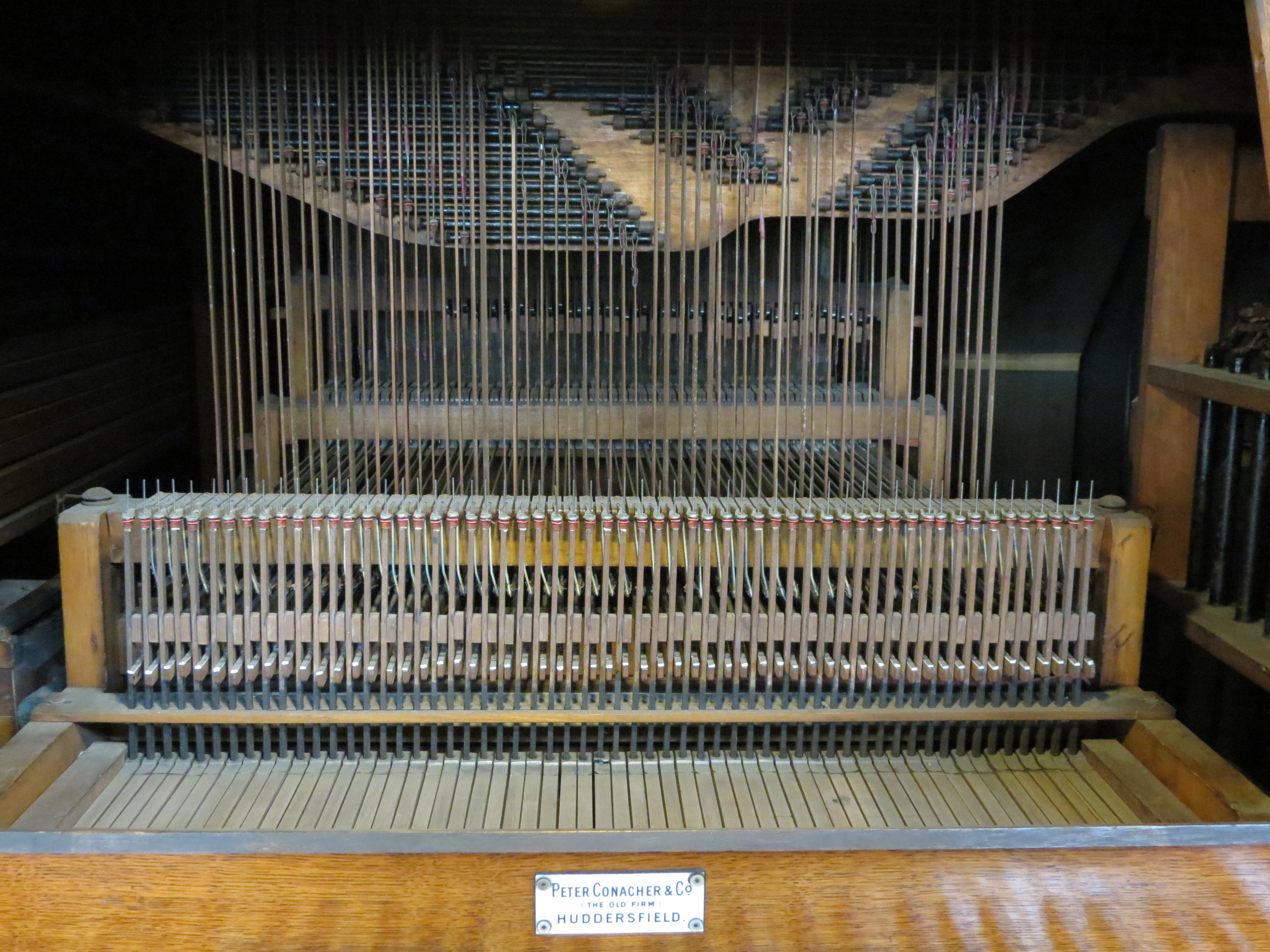
Interior of the organ showing part of the tracker action.

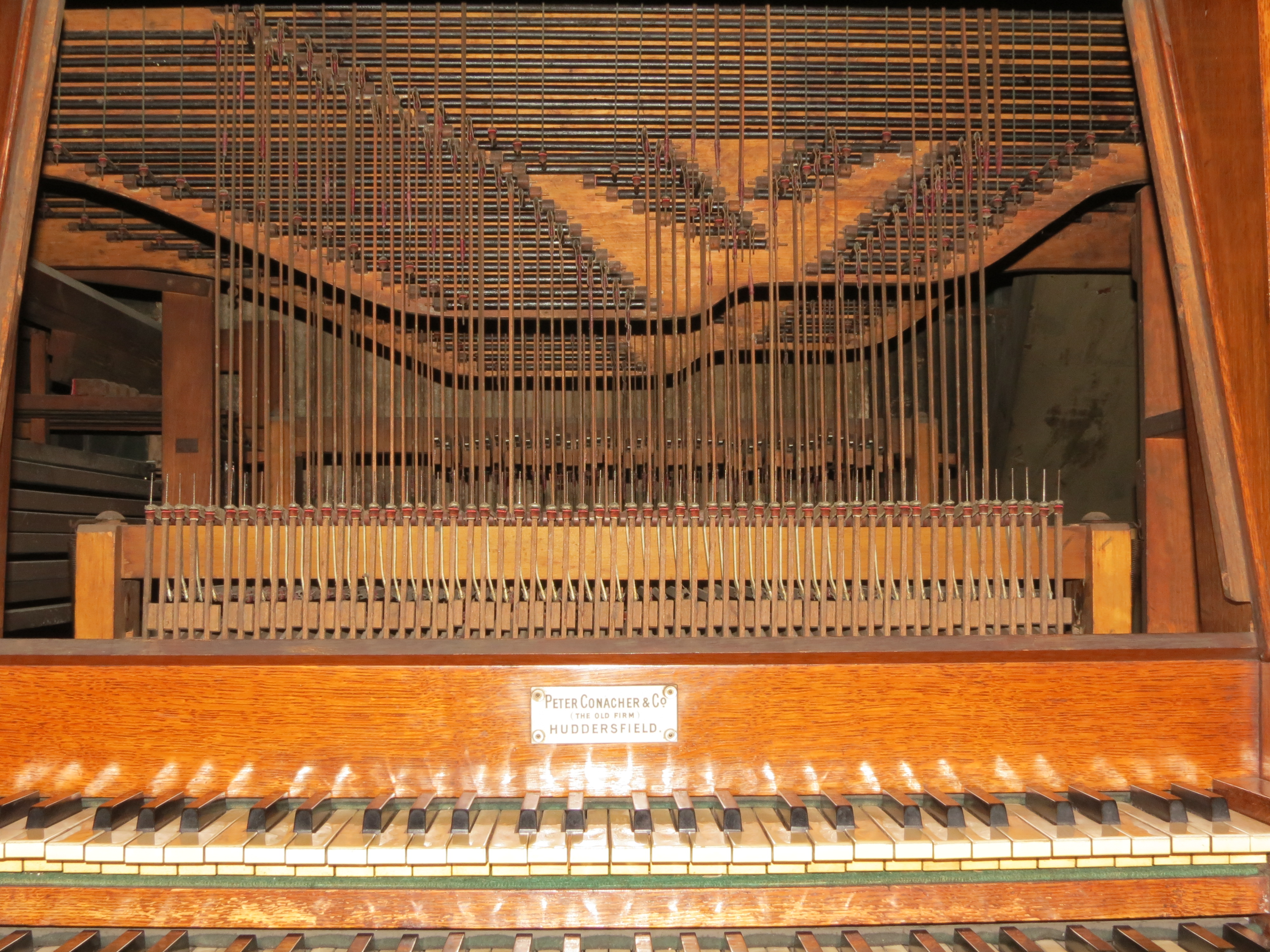
Additional view of the action. The slightly different view shows more of the rotating rods under the swell box which transmit the motion sideways to line up with pipes.

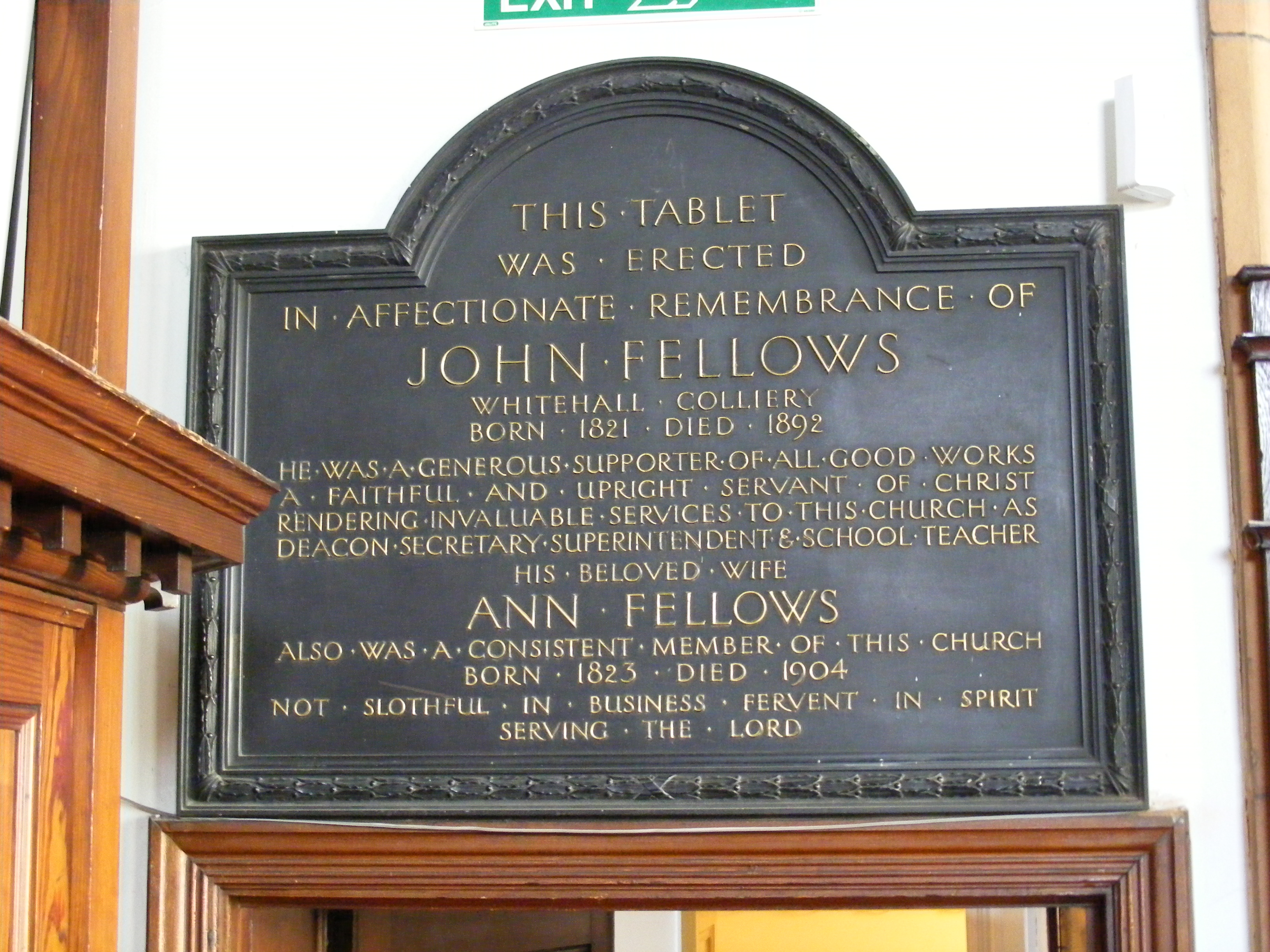
Memorial to John and Ann Fellows, who were leading members of Cradley Heath Baptist Church during the nineteenth century.

== Links ==
Cradley Heath Baptist Church blogspot site with notice board including samples of messages by various preachers.

Baptist Union of Great Britain
