= Bert Head (trade unionist) =

British trade union leader

Albert Edward Head (29 May 1892 – 15 February 1978) was a British trade union leader. The longest-serving leader of a British trade union, he also served as chair of the General Federation of Trade Unions.

Head was born in Cradley, then in Worcestershire. He left school when he was thirteen, and soon found work at a chain-making factory. He completed an apprenticeship and worked at a number of local factories, also joining the Chain Makers' and Strikers' Association (CMSA). In the late 1910s, he became works secretary for the union, and also served on its executive.

In 1933, the union discovered that its secretary, Charles Sitch, had been embezzling its funds, and although the union had more than 1,000 members, fewer than 250 had actually paid membership. Sitch was removed from office and later jailed for the crime, while Head beat three other candidates to become the union's new general secretary.

As full-time leader of the union, Head decided to rebuild it by visiting all the factories at which it had members, and meeting as many of them as possible. This proved a success, and by 1939, its paid up membership was again more than 1,000. Membership peaked at 1,800 after World War II, but then fell in line with employment in the industry.

Head was elected to the management committee of the General Federation of Trade Unions (GFTU) in 1940, and he was chair of the federation in 1957–1958. He remained leader of the union into the 1970s, but by this point, membership was less than 200, and in 1972 it was expelled from the GFTU and Trades Union Congress for defying their policy and registering with the government. Due to these setbacks, the union was dissolved at the end of 1977, Head by this point being the oldest trade union leader and the longest-serving, in the UK.

Trade union offices
| Preceded by Charles Sitch | General Secretary of the Chain Makers' and Strikers' Association; 1933–1977 | Succeeded by Position abolished |
| Preceded by Cecil Heap | Chair of the General Federation of Trade Unions; 1957–1958 | Succeeded by Jack Wigglesworth |
