= Barbara Cosens =

American legal educator

University Distinguished Professor Emerita Barbara Cosens
- Born: Sierra Nevada, California, USA

Academic background
- Education: B.S., Geology, (Department Award for Outstanding Achievement) 1977, University of California, Davis; M.S., Geology, 1982, University of Washington; J.D.(magna cum laude), 1990, University of California Law, San Francisco; LL.M., (summa cum Laude) 2002, Lewis & Clark Law School
- Thesis: M.S. in Geology: Initiation and collapse of active circulation in a hydrothermal system at the Mid-Atlantic Ridge, 23°N (1982); LL.M in Environmental Law: Three published papers on cross-jurisdictional water dispute resolution in the western United States. (2000)

Academic work
- Institutions: San Francisco State University; University of Idaho College of Law
- Main interests: Water Law and Policy, Interdisciplinary Water Resources, Inter-Governmental Water Dispute Resolution

Barbara Anne Cosens is an American University Distinguished Professor Emerita at the University of Idaho College of Law.

== Early life and education ==
Cosens was born and raised in Sierra Nevada, California, and earned her bachelor's degree in Geology from the University of California, Davis. She would later earn her Master's degree in Geology from the University of Washington, her J.D. from the University of California Law, San Francisco and her LL.M. in Environmental Law at Lewis and Clark Law School.

== Career ==
After working her way through graduate school in various summer field geology positions, Cosens joined UNOCAL Geothermal in 1983. The division was part of the major push by fossil fuel companies to do research and development of alternative energy sources as part of the Carter Administration push to wean the United States off foreign oil. Cosens did research and development at the Geysers and Salton Sea geothermal areas, research at the Tiwi Geothermal field in the Philippines, and exploration in Japan on the island of Hokkaido.

After earning her J.D. in Law, Cosens clerked for Justice Lohr of the Colorado Supreme Court. She then joined the staff of the Montana Reserved Water Rights Compact Commission and spent 10 years leading interdisciplinary teams in the negotiation of water right settlements with Native American Tribes and federal agencies.

In 2002, Cosens joined the College of Behavioral and Social Sciences at San Francisco State University (SFSU) as an assistant professor of environmental studies in a tenure track position. She spent two years at SFSU before joining the University of Idaho College of Law. By the 2009–2010 academic term, she received tenure from the University. In 2018, Cosens was promoted to the rank of University Distinguished Professor.

From 2006-2015, Cosens worked with faculty across the University of Idaho and led by Dr. Jan Boll (hydrologist, now at Washington State University) to develop an interdisciplinary graduate program in Water Resources at the University of Idaho. In addition to M.S. and Ph.D. degrees, the program offered joint JD/MS and JD/PhD degrees. The effort was funded by a $1.5 million internal University of Idaho grant following a competitive process. The program attracted students from all over the country, was successful in funding students with grants, and was a recipient of an Interdisciplinary Graduate Education and Research Traineeship (IGERT) grant from NSF that brought over 20 Ph.D. candidates to the University of Idaho.

She helped found the Universities Consortium on Columbia River Governance and served from 2007-2024 as the University of Idaho representative on a team that included representation from Oregon State University, University of Washington, University of Montana, University of Calgary and University of British Columbia to:

- Convene and facilitate a nonpartisan forum for transboundary dialogue on Columbia River governance and the Columbia River Treaty;

- Provide decision-relevant information by connecting university research to the needs and interests of constituents within the basin; and

- Inspire and prepare future leader by engaging students in research, education, and policy dialogue.

Cosens used her sabbaticals at the University of Idaho to do research as a visiting professor. In 2012, she was visiting scholar the University of New Mexico School of Law, Utton Center, where she worked with colleagues on development of a database for Native American Water Right Settlements. In 2015, Cosens received a fellowship in the ANZOG-Goyder Institute Visiting Professors Program in Public Sector Policy and Management, at Flinders University in South Australia, studying water policy and management during the Australian millennium drought. Her focus was on the Lake Eyre Basin, an internally drained basin fed by monsoons in northern Australia.

With funding from the National Socio-Environmental Synthesis Center in Annapolis, Maryland, Cosens worked with Dr. Lance Gunderson (ecologist, Emery University) to lead the Adaptive Water Governance project from 2013 to 2015. The project brought together scholars from across the United States to explore how Resilience Theory might inform adaptation and transformation of water basins facing climate change. In 2016 she lectured as a distinguished scholar at SESYNC. From 2017-2019 she worked with Gunderson and colleagues Niko Soininen, (legal scholar with the Law School and the Faculty of Social Sciences and Business Studies at the University of Eastern Finland) and JB Ruhl (legal scholar, Vanderbilt University Law School) to bring together legal scholars look specifically at the need for changes in environmental governance in the face of increasing complexity.

== Selected publications ==
=== Peer Reviewed and Law Journals ===
Cosens, Barbara, J. B. Ruhl, Niko Soininen, Lance Gunderson, Antti Belinskij, Thorsten Blenckner, Alejandro E. Camacho, Brian C. Chaffin, Robin Kundis Craig, Holly Doremus, Robert Glicksman, Anna-Stiina Heiskanen, Rhett Larson, and Jukka Similä. Governing complexity: Integrating science, governance, and law to manage accelerating change in the globalized commons. PNAS (2021) Vol. 118 No. 36

Cosens, B., JB Ruhl, Niko Soininen and Lance Gunderson (2020) Designing Law to Enable Adaptive Governance of Modern Wicked Problems, 73 (6) Vanderbilt Law Review 1687-1732.

Cosens, B. A., R. K. Craig, S. Hirsch, C. (Tony) Arnold, M. H. Benson, D. A. DeCaro, A. S. Garmestani, H. Gosnell, J. Ruhl and E. Schlager. 2017. The role of law in adaptive governance. Ecology and Society 22 (1):30. [online]

Cosens, B. 2016. Water Law Reform in the Face of Climate Change: Learning from Drought in Australia and the Western United States. 33 Environmental and Planning Law Journal 372 Special Issue: “Rethinking Water Law and Governance” eds. C. Holley and D. Sinclair

Cosens, B. 2016. The Columbia River Treaty: An Opportunity for Modernization of Basin Governance. Colorado Natural Resources, Energy & Environmental Law Review 27(1): 1-19

Cosens, B., Gunderson, L. and Chaffin, B. 2014. The Adaptive Water Governance Project: Assessing Law, Resilience and Governance in Regional Socio-Ecological Water Systems facing a Changing Climate. 51 Natural Resources and Environmental Law Edition of the Idaho Law Review 1

Cosens, B. 2006. 2005 Indian Water Rights Settlement Conference Keynote Address, 9 Denver Water Law Review, Issue 2

Cosens, B. 2002. The Measure of Indian Water Rights: The Arizona Homeland Standard, Gila River Adjudication. 42 Natural Resources Journal 835.

Cosens, B. 1998. The 1997 Water Rights Settlement Between the State of Montana and the Chippewa Cree Tribe of the Rocky Boy’s Reservation - The Role of Community and of the Trustee. 16 UCLA Journal of Environmental Law and Policy 255.

Cosens Gallinatti, B. 1984. Initiation and Collapse of Active Circulation in a Hydrothermal System at the Mid-Atlantic Ridge, 23ºN Journal of Geophysical Research, vol. 89, no. B5, pg. 3275 (1984)

=== Casebooks ===
Dylan R. Hedden-Nicely, Barbara A. Cosens, Dale D. Goble, Water Law of the American West: A Systems Approach (Carolina Academic Press, 2025).

=== Edited volumes ===
Cosens, B. and Gunderson, L. (eds) (2018) Practical Panarchy for Adaptive Water Governance: Linking Law to Social-Ecological Resilience. Springer Publications

The Columbia River Treaty Revisited: Transboundary River Governance in the Face of Uncertainty, edited by Barbara Cosens, A Project of the Universities Consortium on Columbia River Governance (Oregon State University Press, 2012).

Cosens, B. and J. Royster eds. The Future of Federal and Indian Reserved Water Rights: The Winters Centennial (University of New Mexico Press 2012).

=== Articles with Students ===
Pace, Bronson J. and Cosens, Barbara A., Environmental Assessment in a Time of Rapid Change and High Uncertainty: The Addition of Resilience Assessment to NEPA, 47(2) Environmental Law & Policy Review 317 (2023)

Matsaw, Sammy, Hedden-Nicely, Dylan and Cosens, Barbara A. (2020) Cultural linguistics and Treaty Language: A modernized approach to interpreting treaty language to capture the Tribe’s understanding. 50 Environmental Law 415-446.

Stahl, Amanda T., Fremier, Alexander K. and Cosens, Barbara A. (2020) Mapping legal authority for terrestrial conservation corridors along streams Conservation Biology, Volume 00, No. 0, 1–13

Chaffin, B. C., H. Gosnell, and B. A. Cosens. 2014. A decade of adaptive governance scholarship: synthesis and future directions. Ecology and Society 19(3): 56.
