= Kingswinford (constituency) =

Parliamentary constituency in the United Kingdom, 1885–1950

- Former borough constituency for the House of Commons

1885–1950
- Seats: one
- Created from: West Staffordshire
- Replaced by: Brierley Hill and Rowley Regis and Tipton

Kingswinford was a parliamentary constituency centred on the town of Kingswinford in Staffordshire. It returned one Member of Parliament (MP) to the House of Commons of the Parliament of the United Kingdom.

The constituency was created for the 1885 general election, and abolished for the 1950 general election, when the new Brierley Hill constituency took over much of the area, Brierley Hill Urban District having already absorbed much of Kingswinford Rural District more than a decade earlier.

== Boundaries ==
=== 1885-1918 ===
The Sessional Divisions of Bilston, Kingswinford, Wordsley, Rowley Regis, Sedgley, Willenhall, Wolverhampton and the municipal borough of Wolverhampton.

=== 1918-1950 ===
The Urban Districts of Amblecote, Brierley Hill, Quarry Bank, and Rowley Regis, and the Rural District of Kingswinford.

== Members of Parliament ==
Election	Member	Party
1885	Alexander Staveley Hill	Conservative
1900	William George Webb	Conservative
1905 by-election	Henry Staveley-Hill	Conservative
1918	Charles Sitch	Labour
1931	Alan Todd	Conservative
1935	Arthur Henderson	Labour
1950	constituency abolished: see Brierley Hill	

=== Contributions in Parliament by Kingswinford MPs ===
Mr Alexander Hill November 24, 1885 - October 1, 1900

Mr William Webb October 1, 1900-June 14, 1905

Mr Charles Sitch December 14, 1918-October 27, 1931

Mr Alan Todd October 27, 1931-November 14, 1935

Mr Arthur Henderson November 14, 1935-February 23, 1950

== Election results 1885-1918 ==
Decades:	1880s; 1890s; 1900s; 1910s

=== Elections in the 1880s ===
Hill

General election 1885: Kingswinford
Party	Candidate	Votes	%	±%
Conservative	Alexander Staveley Hill	5,161	53.3	
Liberal	George King Harrison	4,530	46.7	
Majority		631	6.6	
Turnout		9,691	79.0	
Registered electors		12,272		
Conservative win (new seat)				

General election 1886: Kingswinford
Party	Candidate	Votes	%	±%
Conservative	Alexander Staveley Hill	Unopposed		
Conservative hold				

=== Elections in the 1890s ===
General election 1892: Kingswinford
Party	Candidate	Votes	%	±%
Conservative	Alexander Staveley Hill	5,371	58.6	N/A
Liberal	Thomas Parker	3,800	41.4	New
Majority		1,571	17.2	N/A
Turnout		9,171	78.0	N/A
Registered electors		11,757		
Conservative hold		Swing	N/A	

General election 1895: Kingswinford
Party	Candidate	Votes	%	±%
Conservative	Alexander Staveley Hill	Unopposed		
Conservative hold				

=== Elections in the 1900s ===
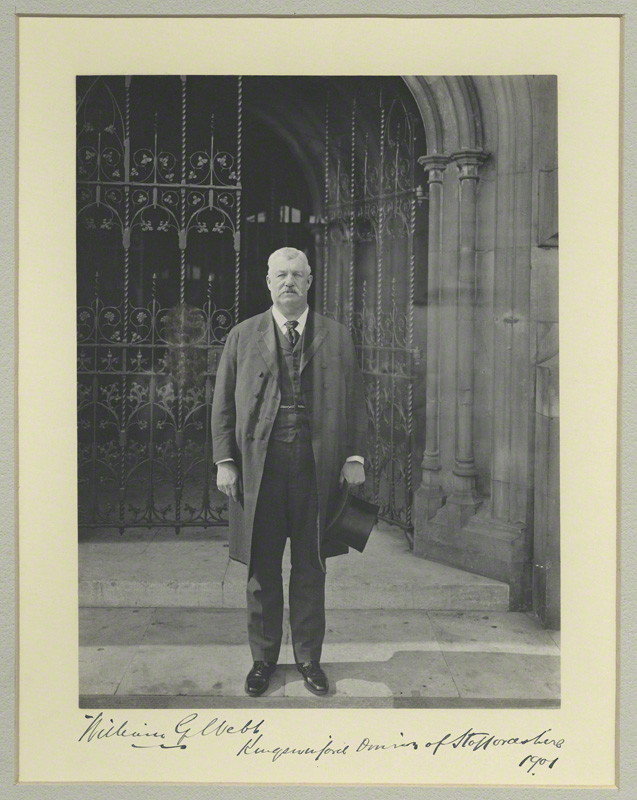
Webb

General election 1900: Kingswinford
Party	Candidate	Votes	%	±%
Conservative	William George Webb	Unopposed		
Conservative hold				

1905 Kingswinford by-election
Party	Candidate	Votes	%	±%
Conservative	Henry Staveley-Hill	5,490	52.9	N/A
Liberal	Edward Marten Dunne	4,887	47.1	New
Majority		603	5.8	N/A
Turnout		10,377	78.0	N/A
Registered electors		13,301		
Conservative hold		Swing	N/A	

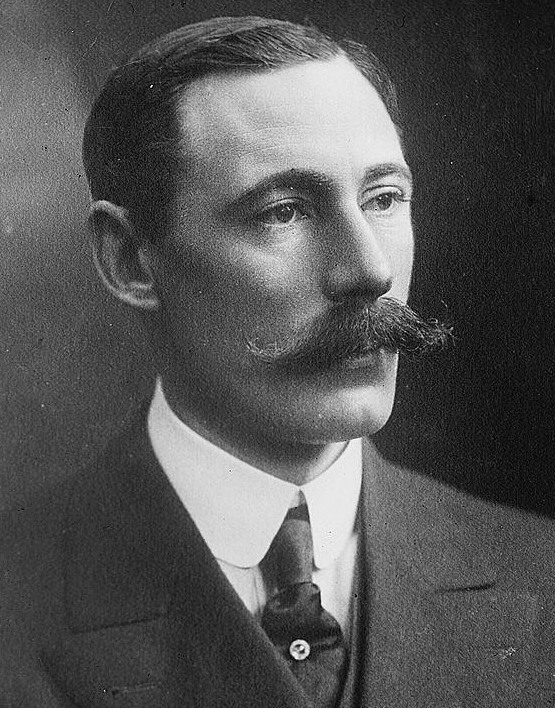
Guest

General election 1906: Kingswinford
Party	Candidate	Votes	%	±%
Conservative	Henry Staveley-Hill	6,311	53.6	N/A
Liberal	Frederick Guest	5,470	46.4	N/A
Majority		841	7.2	N/A
Turnout		11,781	84.7	N/A
Registered electors		13,912		
Conservative hold		Swing	N/A	

=== Elections in the 1910s ===
General election January 1910: Kingswinford
Party	Candidate	Votes	%	±%
Conservative	Henry Staveley-Hill	7,267	58.2	+4.6
Liberal	Frederick L. Coysh	5,226	41.8	−4.6
Majority		2,041	16.4	+9.2
Turnout		12,493	88.8	+4.1
Conservative hold		Swing	+4.6	

General election December 1910: Kingswinford
Party	Candidate	Votes	%	±%
Conservative	Henry Staveley-Hill	Unopposed		
Conservative hold				

General Election 1914–15:

Another General Election was required to take place before the end of 1915. The political parties had been making preparations for an election to take place and by July 1914, the following candidates had been selected;

- Unionist: Henry Staveley-Hill
- Liberal: Geoffrey Mander

== Election results 1918-1949 ==
Decades:	1910s; 1920s; 1930s; 1940s

=== Elections in the 1910s ===
General election 1918: Kingswinford
Party	Candidate	Votes	%	±%
Labour	Charles Sitch	10,397	47.6	New
Unionist	Arthur Edward Beck	7,509	34.4	N/A
Liberal	Henry Ernest Brown	3,943	18.0	New
Majority		2,888	13.2	N/A
Turnout		21,849	57.6	N/A
Registered electors		37,924		
Labour gain from Unionist		Swing	N/A	

=== Elections in the 1920s ===
General election 1922: Kingswinford
Party	Candidate	Votes	%	±%
Labour	Charles Sitch	15,232	51.6	+4.0
National Liberal	Gilbert Hugh Beyfus	14,313	48.4	+30.4
Majority		919	3.2	−10.0
Turnout		29,545	75.2	+17.6
Registered electors		39,306		
Labour hold		Swing	N/A	

General election 1923: Kingswinford
Party	Candidate	Votes	%	±%
Labour	Charles Sitch	15,174	49.5	−2.1
Unionist	William Harcourt-Webb	10,862	35.4	New
Liberal	Cecil Patrick Blackwell	4,633	15.1	−33.3
Majority		4,312	14.1	+10.9
Turnout		30,669	76.6	+1.4
Registered electors		40,045		
Labour hold		Swing	+15.6	

General election 1924: Kingswinford
Party	Candidate	Votes	%	±%
Labour	Charles Sitch	17,235	51.5	+2.0
Unionist	William Harcourt-Webb	16,208	48.5	+13.1
Majority		1,027	3.0	−11.1
Turnout		33,443	82.6	+6.0
Registered electors		40,470		
Labour hold		Swing	−5.6	

General election 1929: Kingswinford
Party	Candidate	Votes	%	±%
Labour	Charles Sitch	22,479	53.2	+1.7
Unionist	Sidney Garcke	12,151	28.7	−19.8
Liberal	Alfred William Bowkett	7,639	18.1	New
Majority		10,328	24.5	+21.5
Turnout		42,269	79.0	−3.6
Registered electors		53,530		
Labour hold		Swing	+10.8	

=== Elections in the 1930s ===
General election 1931: Kingswinford
Party	Candidate	Votes	%	±%
Conservative	Alan Todd	21,934	52.94	+24.2
Labour	Charles Sitch	19,495	47.06	−6.2
Majority		2,439	5.88	N/A
Turnout		41,429	75.14	−3.9
Conservative gain from Labour		Swing	+15.2	

General election 1935: Kingswinford
Party	Candidate	Votes	%	±%
Labour	Arthur Henderson	20,925	50.02	+2.9
Conservative	Alan Todd	20,909	49.98	−2.9
Majority		16	0.04	N/A
Turnout		41,204	71.52	−3.6
Labour gain from Conservative		Swing	+2.9	

=== Elections in the 1940s ===
General election 1945: Kingswinford
Party	Candidate	Votes	%	±%
Labour	Arthur Henderson	34,307	69.16	+16.2
Conservative	E.G. Taylor	15,297	30.84	−16.2
Majority		19,010	38.32	+32.3
Turnout		49,604	73.71	+2.2
Labour hold		Swing	+16.2	
