= Henry Staveley-Hill =

Henry Staveley Staveley-Hill TD JP DL (22 May 1865 – 25 March 1946) was a British barrister and Conservative Party politician.

The son of the Conservative politician Alexander Staveley Hill, Hill (who assumed by Royal Licence the name of Staveley in 1906) was educated at Westminster School and St John's College, Oxford, where he rowed for the college. He was called to the bar at the Inner Temple in 1891, and practiced on the Oxford circuit.

Following in the steps of his father, he became first Recorder of Banbury (1903–22) and Conservative Member of Parliament for Kingswinford (1905–18), after winning the 1905 Kingswinford by-election. During the First World War, Staveley-Hill commanded the 2/1st Staffordshire Yeomanry, with the rank of lieutenant-colonel, then became Superintending Officer, Labour Corps, Scottish Command.

Staveley-Hill was appointed a County Court judge in 1918. He resigned in 1928, after an order in bankruptcy had been made against him.
