= George Cosens =

Jamaican-born British church minister (1805–1881)

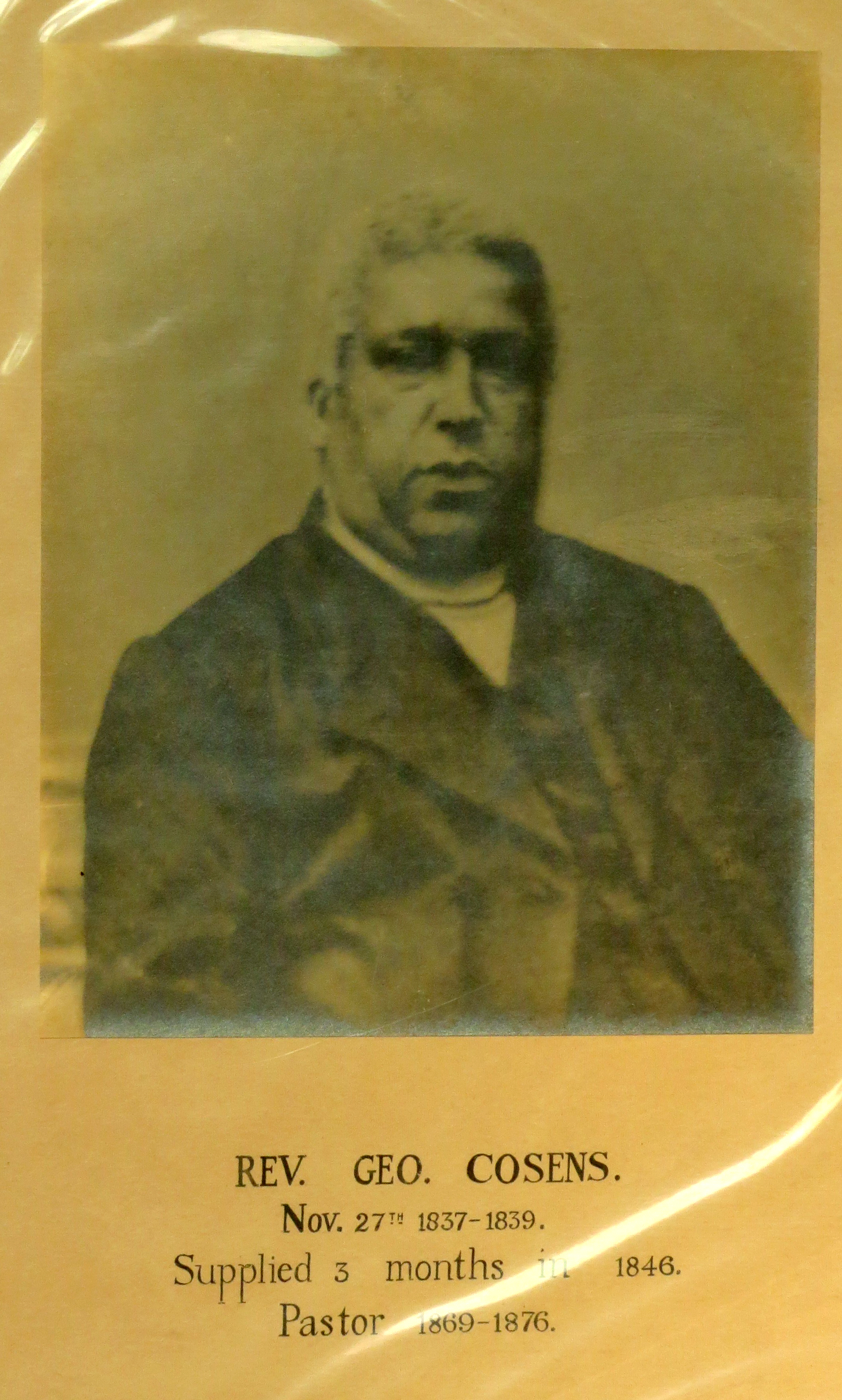
Rev. George Cosens during later pastorate at Cradley Heath

Rev. George Cosens (1805–1881) is the "first reported West Indian minister to hold a pastorate in Britain". He originated from Jamaica, and lived most of his life in Britain having moved to London to study and joining the Primitive Methodists in his late teens. After working as a Primitive Methodist preacher, he joined the Baptists and from 1837 served as a minister in various Baptist churches. He died in working retirement in 1881. George Cosens married twice, Mary Burnet, 1830, and being widowed, Betsy Dancer in 1841. He is buried in the cemetery of Brierley Hill Baptist Church.

== Early life ==
Born in 1805 He was said to have come from Jamaica to study in a London college. In 1823, he was converted to Christianity while he and another student spent some free time in a church.

=== Primitive Methodist work ===
His first church activity was with the Primitive Methodists from 1824. Sailing on 7 May 1832, he was sent by the Sunderland Circuit to the Norman Isles (Jersey and Gurnsey), where he worked to the point of exhaustion in church work and ministry to cholera victims. But it is reported that he had to be recalled after being fined for tactless comments about young people in his audience. During mission work in 1835 to 1836 with the more experienced John Nelson to pioneer new work around Weymouth and Dorchester, he left the Primitive Methodists after a disagreement, and joined the Baptists. Other than the issue of baptism, the beliefs of the Baptists and Primitive Methodists were similar.

== Baptist Ministry ==
Cosens was probably baptised in a Baptist church in Weymouth in 1836 or 37, which would mark his joining the Baptists. His first appointment with the Baptists was as an assistant pastor at the New Connexion of General Baptists Church at Aylesbury in 1837. His first pastorate at Cradley Heath began in November 1837.

=== Cradley Heath ===
Cradley Heath Baptist Church is notable for having had the first Afro-Caribbean Minister in the Black Country, said to be the first known in Britain. In 1837, Rev. George Cosens was called to be minister. He was very popular, and served in various other churches in the area. His first time there was from 1837 to 1839. But he later served at Cradley Heath Baptist Church from 1869 to 1879. His second term was very successful at first, but later the health problems of old age were such that he was to be asked to resign. A meeting of the Deacons of the Church held on 2 June 1879 accepted his resignation. He moved to a less onerous pastorate at Brierley Hill.

== Family life ==
Little is known of George Cosens' Jamaican family. Idris Williams says they disowned him on his conversion to Christianity. He married twice. Firstly, Mary Burnet (18 December 1797 – 27 July 1831), on 24 June 1830, in St John's Church, Newcastle upon Tyne. They had a daughter, born 17 July 1831, who died a month after Mary. In March 1841 he married Betsy Dancer (b. 13 January 1813), a member of the Brierley Hill church where he was then Minister.

Cosens died on 16 August 1881, and was buried in the cemetery of Brierley Hill Baptist Church (DY5 2RR) where he was then the Minister. The life of George Cosens is becoming celebrated in Britain's black community.

The variant spelling George Cousens is found in the 1933 Centenary Souvenir history by Rev. Idris Williams. The spelling Cosens is found in the minutes in the Secretary's Book from 1876 to 1889 and on the inscription on the 1876 photograph.
