= General Council of the Trades Union Congress =

British trade union association

The General Council of the Trades Union Congress is an elected body which is responsible for carrying out the policies agreed at the annual British Trades Union Congresses (TUC).

== Organisation ==
The council has 56 members, all of whom must be proposed by one of the unions affiliated to the TUC. Unions with more members receive an automatic allocation of seats, in proportion to their membership. Smaller unions propose candidates for eleven elected seats. In addition, there are separately elected seats: four for women, three for black workers, at least one of whom must be a woman, and one each for young workers, workers with disabilities, and LGBT workers. The General Secretary also has a seat on the council.

Some members of the council are further elected to serve on the smaller Executive Committee of the TUC. The President of the Trades Union Congress is also chosen by the General Council.

Although the TUC has long had links with the Labour Party, members of the General Council are not permitted to sit on Labour's National Executive Committee.

== History ==
=== 1921 to 1983 ===
Until 1921, the leading body of the TUC was the Parliamentary Committee. This had seventeen members, but by the collapse of the Triple Alliance, it was considered ineffective and to have insufficient powers in industrial matters.

The new General Council had 32 members, elected from industrial groups, each consisting of one or more unions operating in a particular industry. Two of the places were reserved for women. It received additional powers to intervene in the case of major industrial disputes, and to resolve inter-union conflicts. In 1924, the Joint Consultative Committee was set up, which brought trades councils ultimately under the control of the General Council. However, these powers were not always exercised; many members of the council in the early years were elected on grounds of seniority, rather than recent accomplishments. Some were associated with left- and right-wing factions, although most were not strongly identified with a particular wing of the movement.

Changes to the groups and numbers of seats were made over time, as the number of workers represented in different industries fluctuated, but the system survived intact until the early 1980s.

==== Group 1: Mining and Quarrying ====
Robert Smillie, member from 1921 to 1927

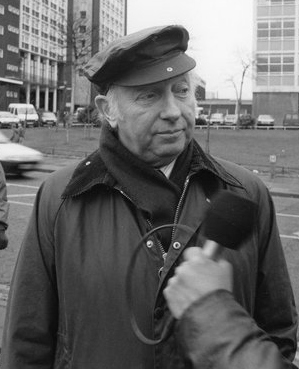
Arthur Scargill, member from 1980 to 1983

Most of the members elected from Group 1 represented the large Miners' Federation of Great Britain, or its successor, the National Union of Mineworkers, but there were several smaller unions which often managed to win one seat.

Year	Representative	Union	Representative	Union	Representative	Union
1921	Robert Thomas Jones	NWQU	Robert Smillie	MFGB	Hugh Murnin	MFGB
1922	Robert Thomas Jones	NWQU	Robert Smillie	MFGB	Herbert Smith	MFGB
1925	Robert Thomas Jones	NWQU	Robert Smillie	MFGB	Thomas Richards	MFGB
1927	Robert Thomas Jones	NWQU	A. J. Cook	MFGB	Thomas Richards	MFGB
1931	Robert Thomas Jones	NWQU	Herbert Smith	MFGB	Ebby Edwards	MFGB
1932	Robert Thomas Jones	NWQU	John McGurk	MFGB	Ebby Edwards	MFGB
1933	Peter Lee	MFGB	William Forshaw	LCNWCEBBF	Ebby Edwards	MFGB
1934	Joseph Jones	MFGB	William Forshaw	LCNWCEBBF	Ebby Edwards	MFGB
1935	Joseph Jones	MFGB	Will Lawther	MFGB	Ebby Edwards	MFGB
1938	R. W. Williams	NWQU	Will Lawther	MFGB	Ebby Edwards	MFGB
1946	Jim Bowman	NUM	Will Lawther	MFGB	Robert J. Jones	NWQU
1950	Bartholomew Walsh	NACODS	Will Lawther	MFGB	Robert J. Jones	NWQU
1950	Ernest Jones	NUM	Will Lawther	MFGB	Robert J. Jones	NWQU
1954	Ernest Jones	NUM	Edwin Hall	NUM	Robert J. Jones	NWQU
1957	Ernest Jones	NUM	Edwin Hall	NUM	Bartholomew Walsh	NACODS
1960	Joseph Crawford	NACODS	Will Paynter	NUM	Len Martin	NUM
1961	Joseph Crawford	NACODS	Fred Collindridge	NUM	Len Martin	NUM
1963	Joseph Crawford	NACODS	Sidney Ford	NUM	Len Martin	NUM
1971	Joseph Crawford	NACODS	Lawrence Daly	NUM	Representation reduced to two seats	
1973	Joe Gormley	NUM	Lawrence Daly	NUM	Representation reduced to two seats	
1980	Arthur Scargill	NUM	Lawrence Daly	NUM	Representation reduced to two seats	
1981	Arthur Scargill	NUM	Ray Chadburn	NUM	Representation reduced to two seats	
1982	Arthur Scargill	NUM	Mick McGahey	NUM	Representation reduced to two seats	

==== Group 2: Railways ====
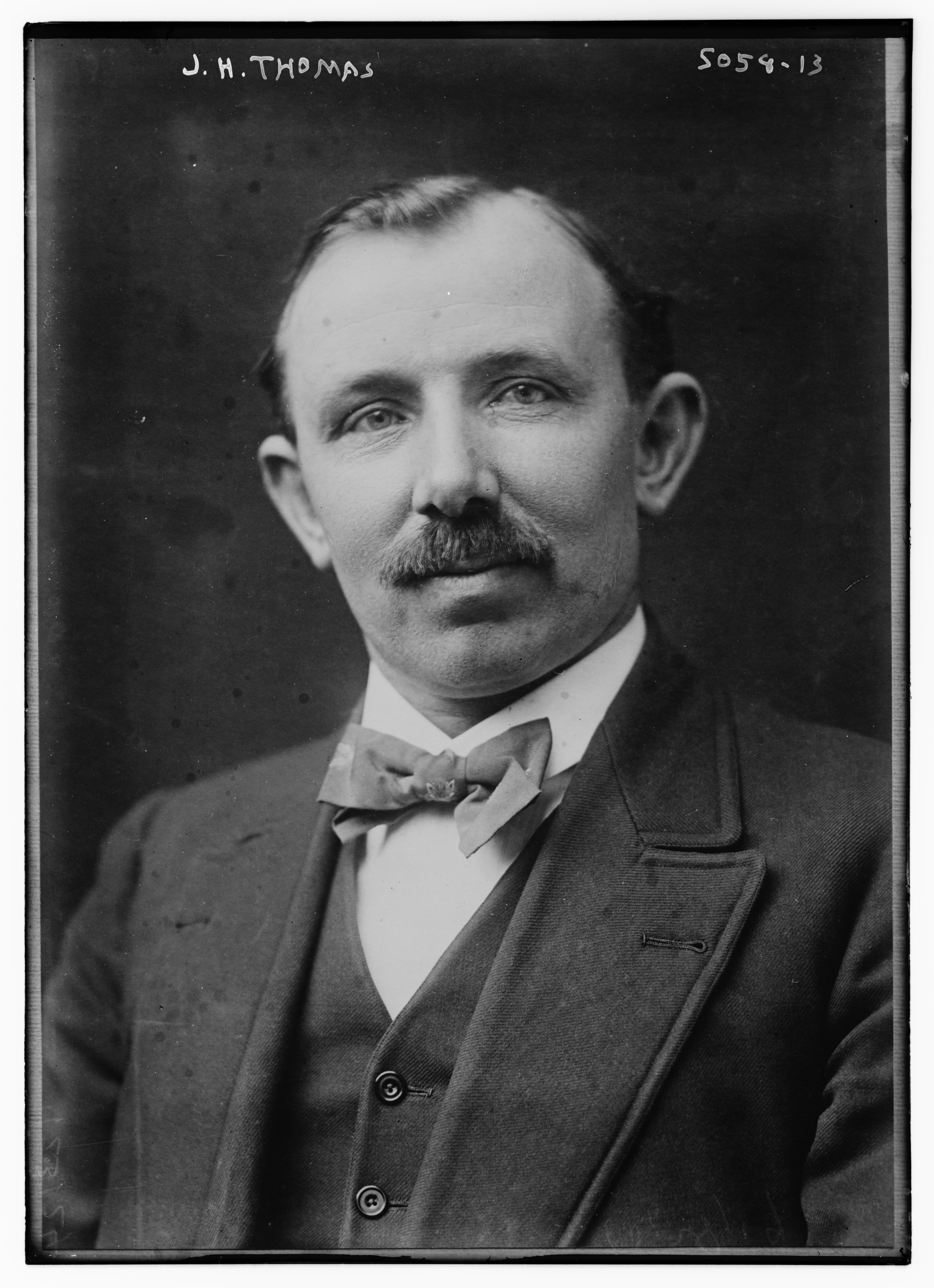
J. H. Thomas, member from 1921 to 1924, and 1925 to 1929

Throughout this period, Group 2 comprised three railway unions: the Associated Society of Locomotive Engineers and Firemen (ASLEF), National Union of Railwaymen (NUR) and Transport Salaried Staffs' Association (TSSA). Each usually saw its general secretary elected to one of the three seats, although the abolition of one seat in 1969 left a battle between ASLEF and the TSSA for the second seat.

Year	Representative	Union	Representative	Union	Representative	Union
1921	Alexander Walkden	TSSA	J. H. Thomas	NUR	John Bromley	ASLEF
1924	Alexander Walkden	TSSA	John Marchbank	NUR	John Bromley	ASLEF
1925	Alexander Walkden	TSSA	J. H. Thomas	NUR	John Bromley	ASLEF
1929	Alexander Walkden	TSSA	Charlie Cramp	NUR	John Bromley	ASLEF
1933	Alexander Walkden	TSSA	John Marchbank	NUR	John Bromley	ASLEF
1936	William Stott	TSSA	John Marchbank	NUR	Richard Squance	ASLEF
1940	Charles Gallie	TSSA	John Marchbank	NUR	William P. Allen	ASLEF
1944	Charles Gallie	TSSA	John Benstead	NUR	William P. Allen	ASLEF
1947	Fred Bostock	TSSA	Jim Figgins	NUR	Jim Baty	ASLEF
1948	George Thorneycroft	TSSA	Jim Figgins	NUR	Jim Baty	ASLEF
1953	Bill Webber	TSSA	Jim Campbell	NUR	Jim Baty	ASLEF
1955	Bill Webber	TSSA	Jim Campbell	NUR	Albert Hallworth	ASLEF
1957	Bill Webber	TSSA	Sidney Greene	NUR	Albert Hallworth	ASLEF
1960	Bill Webber	TSSA	Sidney Greene	NUR	William Evans	ASLEF
1963	John Bothwell	TSSA	Sidney Greene	NUR	Albert Griffiths	ASLEF
1968	Percy Coldrick	TSSA	Sidney Greene	NUR	Albert Griffiths	ASLEF
1969	Percy Coldrick	TSSA	Sidney Greene	NUR	Seat abolished	
1972	Ray Buckton	ASLEF	Sidney Greene	NUR	Seat abolished	
1975	Ray Buckton	ASLEF	Sidney Weighell	NUR	Seat abolished	

==== Group 3: Transport (other than railways) ====
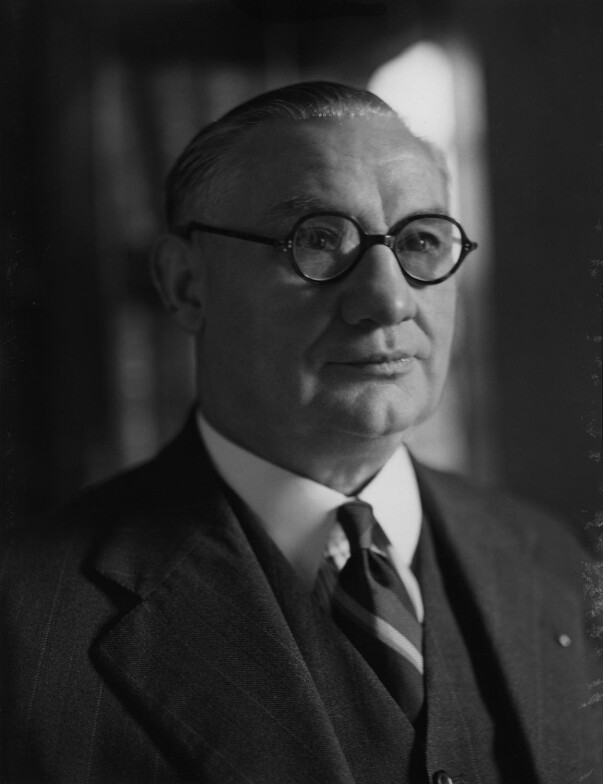
Ernest Bevin, member from 1925 to 1940

By far the largest union in Group 3 was the Transport and General Workers' Union (TGWU), although representatives of the National Union of Seamen and a couple of minor unions often secured one seat.

Year	Representative	Union	Representative	Union	Representative	Union	Representative	Union	Representative	Union
1921	Harry Gosling	ASWLB	Ben Tillett	TGWU	Created 1930		Created 1968		Created 1977	
1924	Joe Cotter	AMWU	Ben Tillett	TGWU	Created 1930		Created 1968		Created 1977	
1925	Ernest Bevin	TGWU	Ben Tillett	TGWU	Created 1930		Created 1968		Created 1977	
1930	Ernest Bevin	TGWU	Ben Tillett	TGWU	John Beard	TGWU	Created 1968		Created 1977	
1931	Ernest Bevin	TGWU	William Robert Spence	NUS	John Beard	TGWU	Created 1968		Created 1977	
1935	Ernest Bevin	TGWU	William Robert Spence	NUS	Walter Farthing	TGWU	Created 1968		Created 1977	
1940	Arthur Deakin	TGWU	William Robert Spence	NUS	Walter Farthing	TGWU	Created 1968		Created 1977	
1942	Arthur Deakin	TGWU	Charles Jarman	NUS	Walter Farthing	TGWU	Created 1968		Created 1977	
1944	Arthur Deakin	TGWU	Charles Jarman	NUS	Bert Papworth	TGWU	Created 1968		Created 1977	
1947	Arthur Deakin	TGWU	Tom Yates	NUS	Bert Papworth	TGWU	Created 1968		Created 1977	
1949	Arthur Deakin	TGWU	Tom Yates	NUS	Albert McAndrews	TGWU	Created 1968		Created 1977	
1955	Jock Tiffin	TGWU	Tom Yates	NUS	A. L. Hill	TGWU	Created 1968		Created 1977	
1956	Frank Cousins	TGWU	Tom Yates	NUS	A. L. Hill	TGWU	Created 1968		Created 1977	
1958	Frank Cousins	TGWU	Tom Yates	NUS	Len Forden	TGWU	Created 1968		Created 1977	
1961	Frank Cousins	TGWU	Jim Scott	NUS	Len Forden	TGWU	Created 1968		Created 1977	
1962	Frank Cousins	TGWU	Bill Hogarth	NUS	Len Forden	TGWU	Created 1968		Created 1977	
1965	Harry Nicholas	TGWU	Bill Hogarth	NUS	Len Forden	TGWU	Created 1968		Created 1977	
1966	Harry Nicholas	TGWU	Bill Hogarth	NUS	Frank Cousins	TGWU	Created 1968		Created 1977	
1967	Bill Jones	TGWU	Bill Hogarth	NUS	Frank Cousins	TGWU	Created 1968		Created 1977	
1968	Bill Jones	TGWU	Bill Hogarth	NUS	Frank Cousins	TGWU	Jack Jones	TGWU	Created 1977	
1969	Bill Jones	TGWU	Bill Hogarth	NUS	Harry Urwin	TGWU	Jack Jones	TGWU	Created 1977	
1970	Fred Howell	TGWU	Bill Hogarth	NUS	Harry Urwin	TGWU	Jack Jones	TGWU	Created 1977	
1972	Fred Howell	TGWU	John Slater	MNAOA	Harry Urwin	TGWU	Jack Jones	TGWU	Created 1977	
1974	Jim Slater	NUS	Stan Pemberton	TGWU	Harry Urwin	TGWU	Jack Jones	TGWU	Created 1977	
1977	Jim Slater	NUS	Stan Pemberton	TGWU	Harry Urwin	TGWU	Jack Jones	TGWU	Moss Evans	TGWU
1978	Jim Slater	NUS	Stan Pemberton	TGWU	Harry Urwin	TGWU	Walter Greendale	TGWU	Moss Evans	TGWU
1980	Jim Slater	NUS	Stan Pemberton	TGWU	Larry Smith	TGWU	Walter Greendale	TGWU	Moss Evans	TGWU
1982	Jim Slater	NUS	Derek Gray	TGWU	Larry Smith	TGWU	Walter Greendale	TGWU	Moss Evans	TGWU

==== Group 4: Shipbuilding ====
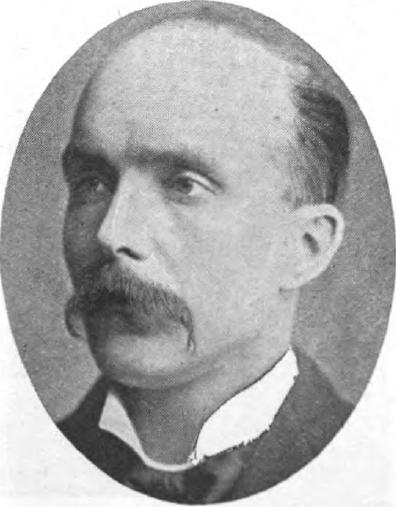
John Hill, member from 1921 to 1936

The Amalgamated Society of Boilermakers dominated Group 4, with various smaller unions gradually merging into it or the general unions.

Year	Representative	Union
1921	John Hill	ASB
1936	Mark Hodgson	ASB
1948	Ted Hill	ASB
1965	Danny McGarvey	ASB
1977	John Chalmers	ASB
1980	Jim Murray	ASB

==== Group 5: Engineering, Founding and Vehicle Building ====
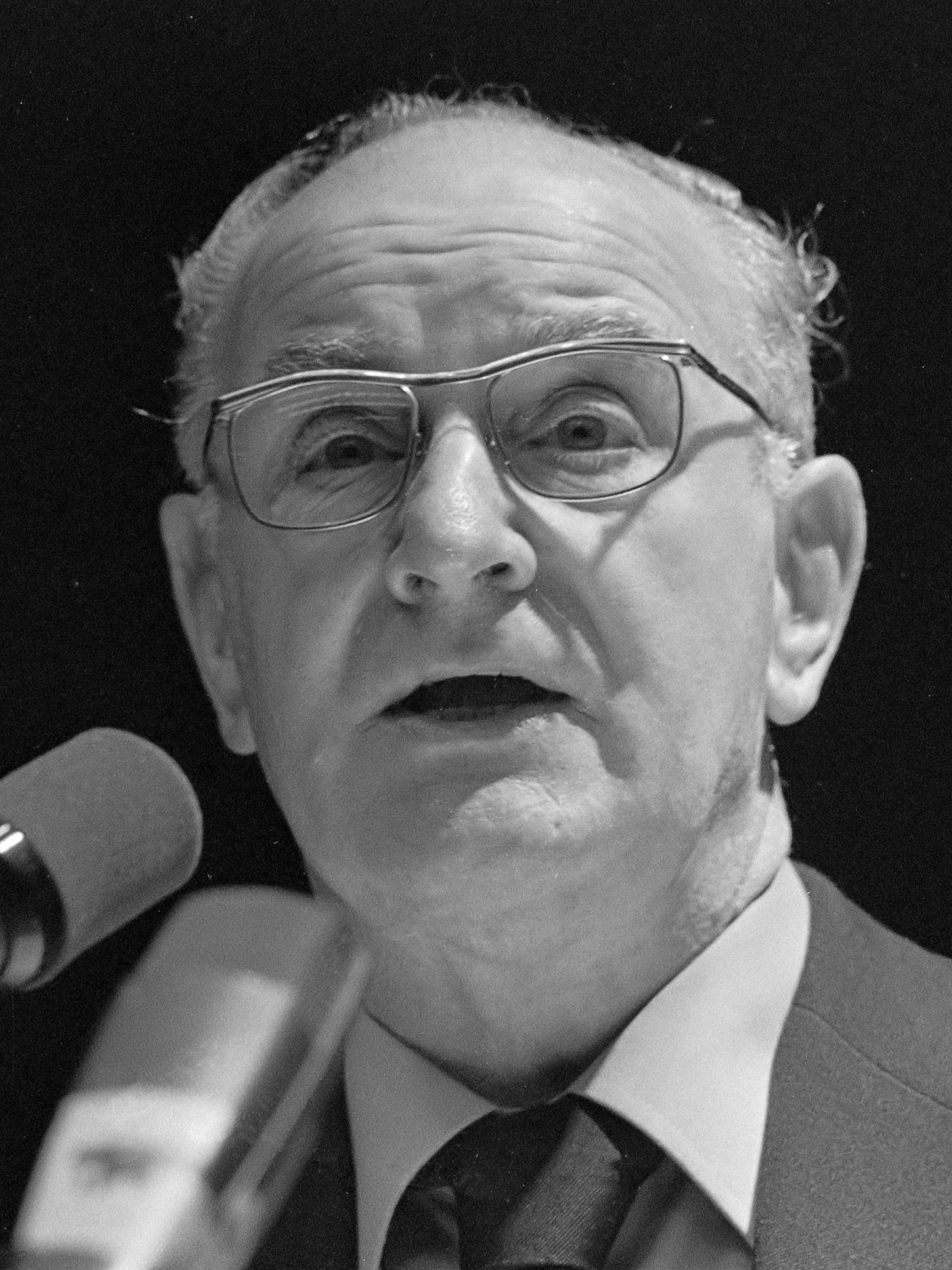
Hugh Scanlon, member from 1968 to 1978

Group 5 contained a large number of unions - 26 in 1934 - and while the Amalgamated Engineering Union (AEU) reliably won at least one seat, unions like the Electrical Trades Union (ETU) and United Patternmakers' Association (UPA) often won seats.

Year	Representative	Union	Representative	Union	Representative	Union	Representative	Union
1921	Alonzo Swales	AEU	Jimmy Rowan	ETU	Allan Findlay	UPA	Created 1968	
1935	Harry Berry	AEU	Jimmy Rowan	ETU	George Walker Thomson	AESD	Created 1968	
1938	James Kaylor	AEU	Jimmy Rowan	ETU	George Walker Thomson	AESD	Created 1968	
1941	James Kaylor	AEU	Ernest Bussey	ETU	George Walker Thomson	AESD	Created 1968	
1943	Jack Tanner	AEU	Ernest Bussey	ETU	George Walker Thomson	AESD	Created 1968	
1947	Jack Tanner	AEU	Wilfred Blackwell Beard	UPA	George Walker Thomson	AESD	Created 1968	
1948	Jack Tanner	AEU	Wilfred Blackwell Beard	UPA	Robert Openshaw	AEU	Created 1968	
1954	William Carron	AEU	Wilfred Blackwell Beard	UPA	Robert Openshaw	AEU	Created 1968	
1957	William Carron	AEU	Wilfred Blackwell Beard	UPA	William Tallon	AEU	Created 1968	
1967	William Carron	AEU	John McFarlane Boyd	AEU	Alf Roberts	NUVB	Created 1968	
1968	Percy Hanley	AEF	John McFarlane Boyd	AEU	Alf Roberts	NUVB	Hugh Scanlon	AEF
1970	Len Edmondson	AUEW	John McFarlane Boyd	AEU	Alf Roberts	NUVB	Hugh Scanlon	AEF
1972	Len Edmondson	AUEW	John McFarlane Boyd	AEU	Les Buck	NUSMWCH&D	Hugh Scanlon	AEF
1975	Len Edmondson	AUEW	Reg Birch	AUEW	Les Buck	NUSMWCH&D	Hugh Scanlon	AEF
1977	Len Edmondson	AUEW	Reg Birch	AUEW	George Guy	NUSMWCH&D	Hugh Scanlon	AEF
1978	John McFarlane Boyd	AUEW	Reg Birch	AUEW	George Guy	NUSMWCH&D	Terence Duffy	AUEW
1979	John McFarlane Boyd	AUEW	Gavin Laird	AUEW	George Guy	NUSMWCH&D	Terence Duffy	AUEW
1982	Ed Scrivens	AUEW	Gerry Russell	AUEW	George Guy	NUSMWCH&D	Terence Duffy	AUEW

==== Group 6: Technical, Engineering and Scientific ====
Year	Representative	Union	Representative	Union
1968	Created 1968		Created 1974	
1968	George Doughty	TASS	Created 1974	
1974	Ken Gill	TASS	Clive Jenkins	ASTMS

==== Group 7: Electrical ====
Year	Representative	Union
1965	Created	
1965	Les Cannon	EETPU
1971	Frank Chapple	EETPU

==== Group 8: Iron and Steel and Minor Metal Trades ====
The Iron and Steel and Minor Metal Trades Group was originally Group 6, but was renumbered in 1968. The Iron and Steel Trades Confederation (ISTC) was the largest union in the group, and consistently held one of its seats. Until 1966, there was a second seat, held by the tiny National Union of Gold, Silver and Allied Trades (NUGSAT), and later by the National Union of Blastfurnacemen (NUB). There were many other small unions in the group - in 1934, it had 23 members.

Year	Representative	Union	Representative	Union
1921	Arthur Pugh	ISTC	William Kean	NUGSAT
1935	John Brown	ISTC	William Kean	NUGSAT
1945	Lincoln Evans	ISTC	Ambrose Callighan	NUB
1947	Lincoln Evans	ISTC	Jack Owen	NUB
1953	Harry Douglass	ISTC	Joseph O'Hagan	NUB
1966	Harry Douglass	ISTC	Reduced to 1 seat	
1967	Dai Davies	ISTC	Reduced to 1 seat	
1975	Bill Sirs	ISTC	Reduced to 1 seat	

==== Group 9: Building, Woodworking and Furnishing ====
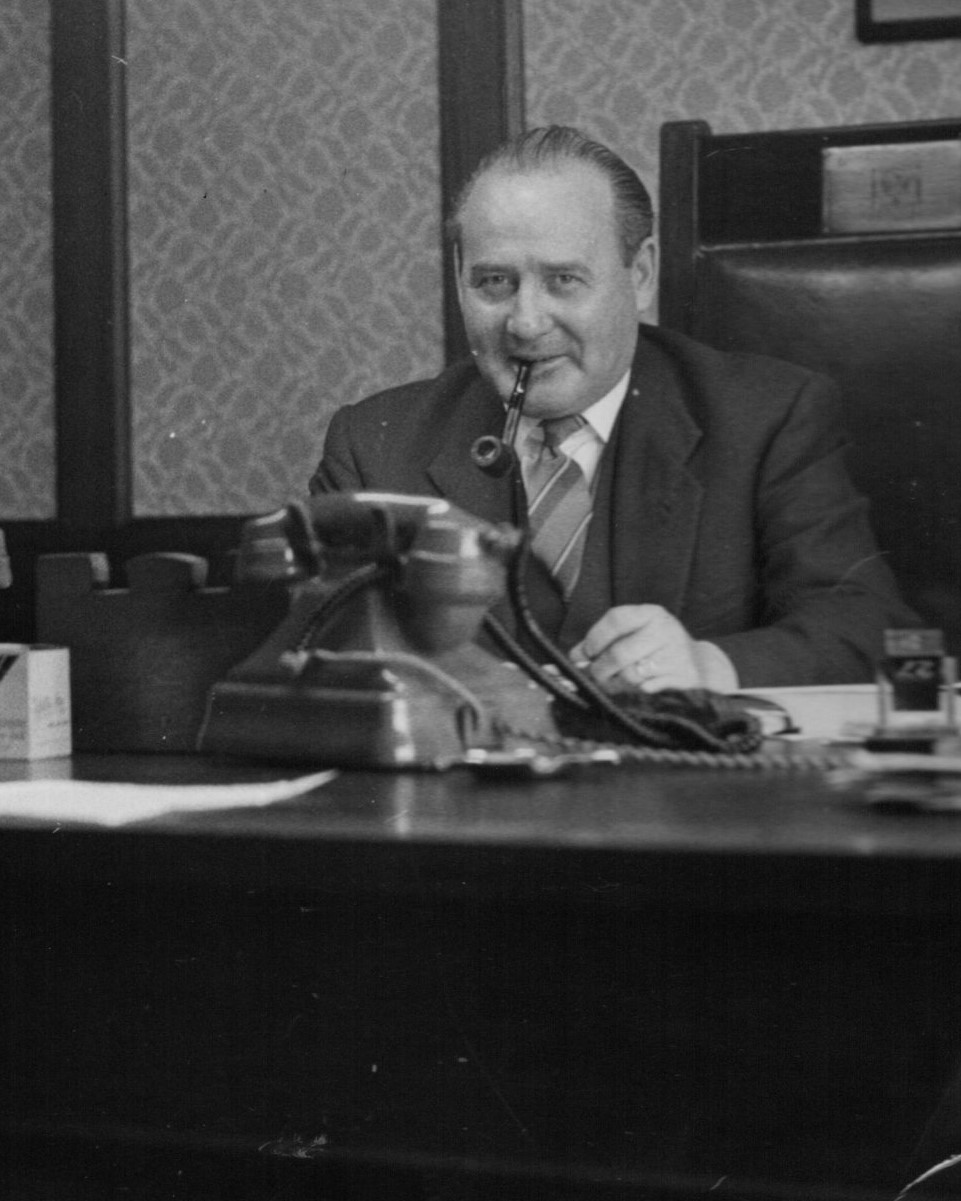
George Lowthian, member from 1952 to 1973

The Building, Woodworking and Furnishing Group was originally Group 7, but was renumbered in 1965. While there were initially a large number of unions in the group, the Amalgamated Union of Building Trade Workers (AUBTW) and Amalgamated Society of Woodworkers (ASW) generally won the seats, and later became part of the Union of Construction, Allied Trades and Technicians (UCATT), which dominated the group from the 1970s. The National Amalgamated Furnishing Trades Association (NAFTA) won a seat in the early years, and pursued an independent course throughout this period.

Year	Representative	Union	Representative	Union
1921	George Hicks	AUBTW	A. A. Purcell	NAFTA
1928	George Hicks	AUBTW	Frank Wolstencroft	ASW
1940	Luke Fawcett	AUBTW	Frank Wolstencroft	ASW
1949	Luke Fawcett	AUBTW	Jack McDermott	ASW
1952	George H. Lowthian	AUBTW	Jack McDermott	ASW
1958	George H. Lowthian	AUBTW	John C. Hill	ASW
1959	George H. Lowthian	AUBTW	George Smith	ASW
1973	Glynn Lloyd	UCATT	George Smith	ASW
1979	Glynn Lloyd	UCATT	Les Wood	UCATT

==== Group 9: Cotton ====
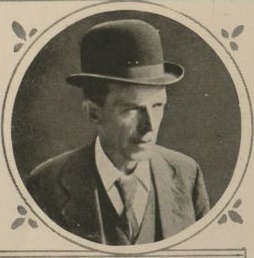
John William Ogden, member from 1921 to 1930

The Cotton Group was the original Group 9; in 1968, it was merged into the Textiles Group. The cotton industry had a large number of small trade unions, and in 1934, the group had 46 members. Unusually, the majority of individual members of the unions were women, but the seats were always won by men, representing one of the three amalgamations to which most of the unions belonged: the Amalgamated Weavers' Association (AWA), the Amalgamated Association of Operative Cotton Spinners (AAOCS), and the Cardroom Amalgamation (CWA).

Year	Representative	Union	Representative	Union
1921	John William Ogden	AWA	Henry Boothman	AAOCS
1930	James Hindle	AWA	Henry Boothman	AAOCS
1936	James Hindle	AWA	William Wood	AAOCS
1937	James Bell	AWA	William Wood	AAOCS
1938	James Bell	AWA	Robert C. Handley	AAOCS
1940	James Bell	AWA	Alfred Roberts	CWA
1945	Andrew Naesmith	AWA	Alfred Roberts	CWA
1953	Lewis Wright	AWA	Alfred Roberts	CWA
1963	Lewis Wright	AWA	Reduced to 1 seat	
1968	Merged into Textiles Group			

==== Group 10: Printing and Paper ====
The Printing and Paper Group was originally Group 8, but was renumbered in 1968. Almost all of its members were involved with printing, and in the early years, the seat was contested by four larger unions: the London Society of Compositors (LSC), National Society of Operative Printers and Assistants (NATSOPA), National Union of Printing, Bookbinding and Paper Workers (NUPBPW), and Typographical Association (TA). Over the years, these undertook a series of mergers, forming new unions, including the Society of Graphical and Allied Trades (SOGAT).

Year	Representative	Union
1921	Herbert Skinner	TA
1932	George Isaacs	NATSOPA
1945	E. W. Spackman	NUPBPW
1947	Robert Willis	LSC
1965	Richard Briginshaw	NATSOPA
1975	Bill Keys	SOGAT

==== Group 11: Textiles ====
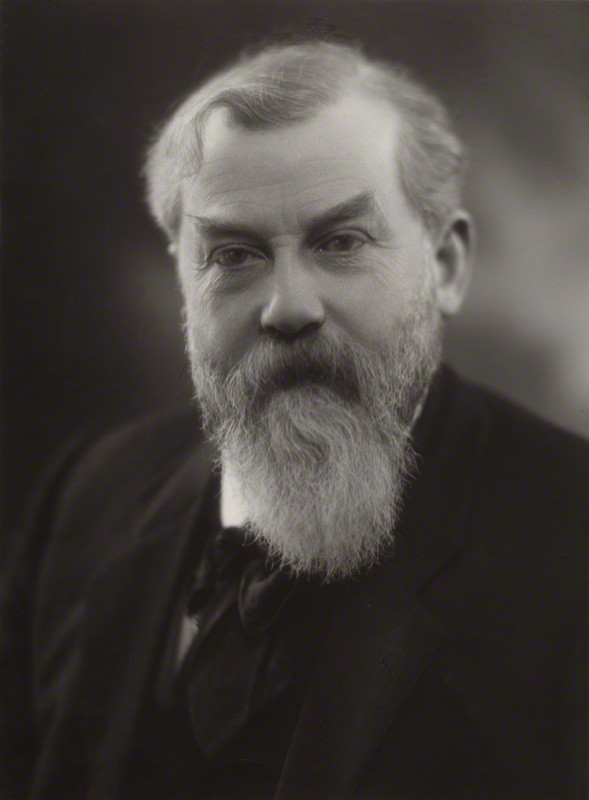
Ben Turner, member from 1921 to 1929

The Textiles Group was originally Group 10: Textiles (other than cotton). Although there were a wide variety of unions - 18 in 1934 - the National Union of Textile Workers (NUTW), and then its successor, the National Union of Dyers, Bleachers and Textile Workers (NUDBTW), almost always won the seat. In 1968, the cotton group was merged in, forming Group 11: Textiles, and while the dyers generally won the seat (latterly as a section of the Transport and General Workers' Union (TGWU), the main cotton workers' union, the National Union of Textile and Allied Workers (NUTAW), held it for a few years.

Year	Representative	Union
1921	Ben Turner	NUTW
1929	Arthur Shaw	NUDBTW
1939	George Bagnall	NUDBTW
1948	Wilfred Heywood	NUDBTW
1957	Leonard Sharp	NUDBTW
1966	Jack Peel	NUDBTW
1972	Joe King	NUTAW
1975	Fred Dyson	NUDBTW
1979	Bill Maddocks	NUDBTW
1982	Eddie Haigh	TGWU

==== Group 12: Clothing ====
The Clothing Group was dominated by the National Union of Tailors and Garment Workers (NUTGW), which gradually absorbed the smaller unions of tailors. It also included unions for hosiery workers which eventually merged as the National Union of Hosiery and Knitwear Workers, and the two Felt Hatters' and Trimmers' Unions of Great Britain. Originally Group 11, in 1968 it absorbed the Boot, Shoe and Leather Group, and was renumbered as Group 12.

Year	Representative	Union
1921	Andrew Conley	NUTGW
1949	Anne Loughlin	NUTGW
1953	John E. Newton	NUTGW
1970	Jack Macgougan	NUTGW
1979	Alec Smith	NUTGW

==== Group 12: Boot, Shoe and Leather ====
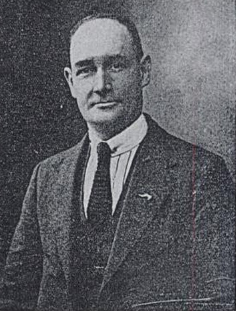
William R. Townley, member from 1930 to 1937

The Boot, Shoe and Leather Group was dominated by the National Union of Boot and Shoe Operatives (NUBSO). It also included smaller rivals, notably the Rossendale Union of Boot, Shoe and Slipper Operatives, unions of leather workers, and the National Union of Glovers. The Boot, Shoe and Leather Group was the original Group 12, but in 1968 it was merged into the Clothing Group.

Year	Representative	Union
1921	Edward L. Poulton	NUBSO
1930	William R. Townley	NUBSO
1937	George Chester	NUBSO
1949	James Crawford	NUBSO
1957	Lionel Poole	NUBSO
1959	Sydney Robinson	NUBSO

==== Group 13: Glass, Pottery, Chemicals, Food, Drink, Tobacco, Brushmaking and Distribution ====
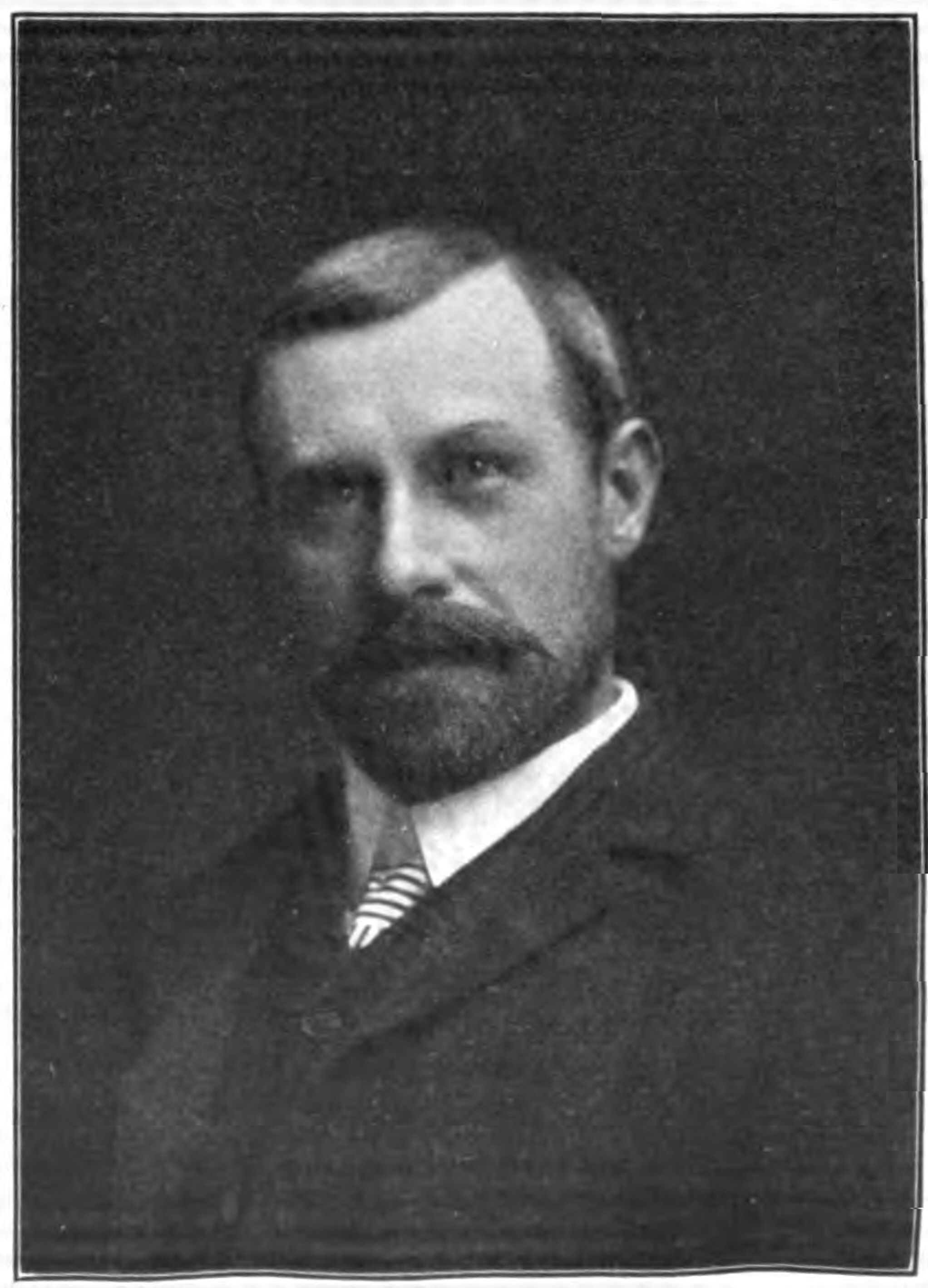
John Turner, member from 1921 to 1925

Group 13 was highly diverse. The most important unions were those involved in distribution, the National Amalgamated Union of Shop Assistants, Warehousemen and Clerks (NAUSAWC) and the National Union of Distributive and Allied Workers (NUDAW), which later merged to form the Union of Shop, Distributive and Allied Workers. In 1952, a second seat was added, and this was invariably filled by representatives of smaller unions, the largest of which were the Bakers', Food and Allied Workers' Union (BFAWU) and the National Society of Pottery Workers (NSPW). There were many smaller unions, and the Tobacco Workers' Union (TWU) secured representation for a few years.

Year	Representative	Union	Representative	Union
1921	John Turner	NAUSAWC	Created 1952	
1925	John Leslie	NAUSAWC	Created 1952	
1926	Joseph Hallsworth	NUDAW	Created 1952	
1947	A. W. Burrows	USDAW	Created 1952	
1949	Alan Birch	USDAW	Created 1952	
1952	Alan Birch	USDAW	Harold Hewitt	NSPW
1962	Alf Allen	USDAW	Harold Hewitt	NSPW
1964	Alf Allen	USDAW	Ernest Haynes	BFAWU
1969	Alf Allen	USDAW	Stan Gretton	BFAWU
1973	Alf Allen	USDAW	Doug Grieve	TWU
1979	Bill Whatley	USDAW	Doug Grieve	TWU

==== Group 14: Agriculture ====
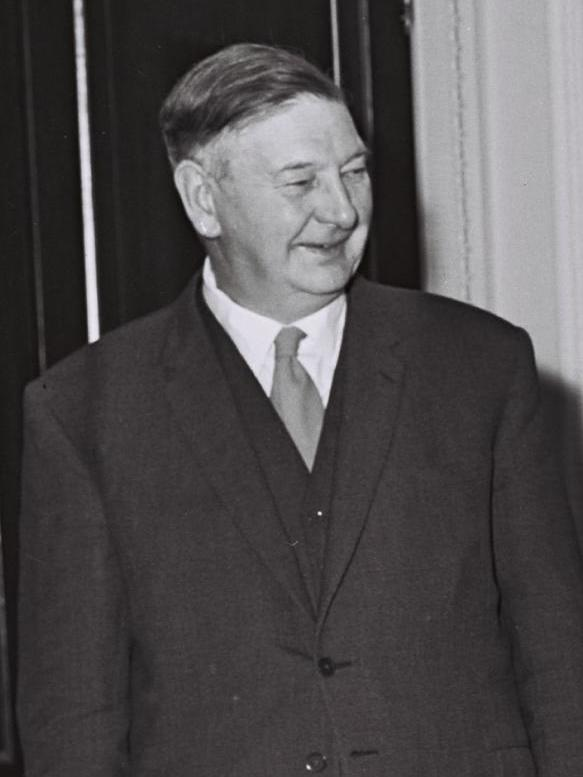
Harold Collison, member from 1953 to 1970

For most of the period, the National Union of Agricultural and Allied Workers (NUAAW) was the only union in Group 14. The Scottish Farm Servants' Union, initially also in this group, merged into the Transport and General Workers' Union early on.

Year	Representative	Union
1921	Robert Barrie Walker	NUAAW
1928	Bill Holmes	NUAAW
1945	Alf Dann	NUAAW
1953	Harold Collison	NUAAW
1970	Reg Bottini	NUAAW
1978	Jack Boddy	NUAAW

==== Group 15: Public Employees ====
Rodney Bickerstaffe, member from 1982 to 1983

Group 15 brought together unions of state and local authority workers. However, the Trade Union Act 1927 banned state employees from joining the TUC, leaving the group dominated by the National Union of Public Employees (NUPE), Mental Hospital and Institutional Workers' Union (MHIWU), National Union of County Officers and Fire Brigades Union (FBU). The ban was lifted after World War II, but a new group was added for civil servants. Despite this, the public employees group steadily grew in size, the affiliation of the National and Local Government Officers' Association and the National Union of Teachers being particularly important, while the Confederation of Health Service Employees (COHSE) absorbed the MHIWU.

Year	Representative	Union	Representative	Union	Representative	Union	Representative	Union	Representative	Union
1921	John William Bowen	UPW	Created 1965		Created 1968		Created 1970		Created 1977	
1928	George Gibson	MHIWU	Created 1965		Created 1968		Created 1970		Created 1977	
1948	Claude Bartlett	COHSE	Created 1965		Created 1968		Created 1970		Created 1977	
1963	Sydney Hill	NUPE	Created 1965		Created 1968		Created 1970		Created 1977	
1965	Sydney Hill	NUPE	Walter Anderson	NALGO	Created 1968		Created 1970		Created 1977	
1968	Alan Fisher	NUPE	Walter Anderson	NALGO	Terry Parry	FBU	Created 1970		Created 1977	
1970	Alan Fisher	NUPE	Walter Anderson	NALGO	Terry Parry	FBU	Edward Britton	NUT	Created 1977	
1973	Alan Fisher	NUPE	Geoffrey Drain	NALGO	Terry Parry	FBU	Edward Britton	NUT	Created 1977	
1974	Alan Fisher	NUPE	Geoffrey Drain	NALGO	Terry Parry	FBU	Fred Jarvis	NUT	Created 1977	
1977	Alan Fisher	NUPE	Geoffrey Drain	NALGO	Terry Parry	FBU	Fred Jarvis	NUT	Albert Spanswick	COHSE
1981	Alan Fisher	NUPE	Geoffrey Drain	NALGO	Ken Cameron	FBU	Fred Jarvis	NUT	Albert Spanswick	COHSE
1982	Rodney Bickerstaffe	NUPE	Geoffrey Drain	NALGO	Ken Cameron	FBU	Fred Jarvis	NUT	Albert Spanswick	COHSE

==== Group 16: Civil Servants ====
The Civil Servants Group was added in 1946, when unions of civil servants were first permitted to affiliate to the TUC.

Year	Representative	Union	Representative	Union	Representative	Union
1946	Created 1946					
1946	Charles Geddes	UCW	Seat added 1952		Seat added 1977	
1952	Charles Geddes	UCW	Douglas Houghton	IRSF	Seat added 1977	
1957	Ron Smith	UCW	Douglas Houghton	IRSF	Seat added 1977	
1960	Ron Smith	UCW	George Green	CSCA	Seat added 1977	
1963	Ron Smith	UCW	Cyril Plant	IRSF	Seat added 1977	
1967	Thomas Jackson	UCW	Cyril Plant	IRSF	Seat added 1977	
1977	Thomas Jackson	UCW	Tony Christopher	IRSF	Ken Thomas	CPSA
1982	Alan Tuffin	UCW	Tony Christopher	IRSF	Alistair Graham	CPSA

==== Group 17: Non-Manual Workers ====
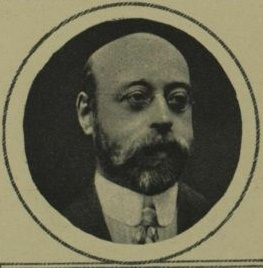
Joe Williams, member from 1921 to 1925

The Non-Manual Workers Group consisted of clerks, insurance staff, workers in entertainment, and doctors. Many of its unions grew rapidly during this period, with the Association of Professional, Executive, Clerical and Computer Staff (APEX), National Association of Theatrical and Kine Employees (NATKE) and Association of Cinematograph, Television and Allied Technicians (ACTT) becoming important. The National Federation of Insurance Workers - later part of the National Union of Insurance Workers - was also sizable, but never gained a seat on the council, unlike the smaller Musicians' Union.

The Non-Manual Workers Group was originally Group 16 and was renumbered on the creation of the Civil Servants Group, in 1946.

Year	Representative	Union	Representative	Union
1921	Joe Williams	MU	Created 1968	
1925	Herbert Henry Elvin	NUCAW	Created 1968	
1940	Tom O'Brien	NATKE	Created 1968	
1968	Tom O'Brien	NATKE	Leslie Littlewood	ABS
1970	Tom O'Brien	NATKE	Alan Sapper	ACTT
1971	Roy Grantham	APEX	Alan Sapper	ACTT
1975	John Morton	MU	Alan Sapper	ACTT

==== Group 18: General Workers ====
There were initially a large number of unions of general workers, but within a couple of decades, they had all been absorbed into two large general unions - the National Union of General and Municipal Workers (NUGMW), which became the sole union in this group, and the Transport and General Workers' Union, which was instead placed in Group 3. The General Workers Group was originally Group 17 and was renumbered on the creation of the Civil Servants Group, in 1948.

Year	Representative	Union	Representative	Union	Representative	Union	Representative	Union
1921	John Beard	WU	Joseph Nicholas Bell	NAUL	John Davenport	UOGL	Will Thorne	NUGW
1922	John Beard	WU	Joseph Nicholas Bell	NAUL	Arthur Hayday	NUGMW	Will Thorne	NUGW
1923	John Beard	WU	J. H. Moore	NLWU	Arthur Hayday	NUGMW	Will Thorne	NUGW
1924	John Beard	WU	John Davenport	TGWU	Arthur Hayday	NUGMW	Will Thorne	NUGW
1930	John Beard	WU	John Davenport	TGWU	Arthur Hayday	NUGMW	Reduced to 3 seats in 1930	
1934	Charles Dukes	NUGMW	Will Sherwood	NUGMW	Arthur Hayday	NUGMW	Reduced to 3 seats in 1930	
1937	Charles Dukes	NUGMW	Herbert Bullock	NUGMW	Harry N. Harrison	NUGMW	Reduced to 3 seats in 1930	
1947	Tom Williamson	NUGMW	Herbert Bullock	NUGMW	Harry N. Harrison	NUGMW	Reduced to 3 seats in 1930	
1948	Tom Williamson	NUGMW	Herbert Bullock	NUGMW	Herbert Eastwood	URWGB	Reduced to 3 seats in 1930	
1949	Tom Williamson	NUGMW	Herbert Bullock	NUGMW	Tom Eccles	NUGMW	Reduced to 3 seats in 1930	
1950	Tom Williamson	NUGMW	Frederick Hayday	NUGMW	Tom Eccles	NUGMW	Reduced to 3 seats in 1930	
1959	Tom Williamson	NUGMW	Frederick Hayday	NUGMW	Jack Cooper	NUGMW	Reduced to 3 seats in 1930	
1962	Bernard Swindell	NUGMW	Frederick Hayday	NUGMW	Jack Cooper	NUGMW	Reduced to 3 seats in 1930	
1966	David Basnett	NUGMW	Frederick Hayday	NUGMW	Jack Cooper	NUGMW	Reduced to 3 seats in 1930	
1973	David Basnett	NUGMW	Alexander Mitchell Donnet	NUGMW	Jack Eccles	NUGMW	Reduced to 3 seats in 1930	
1976	David Basnett	NUGMW	Ken Baker	NUGMW	Jack Eccles	NUGMW	Reduced to 3 seats in 1930	

==== Group 19: Women Workers ====
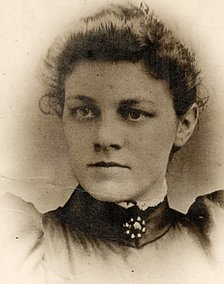
Julia Varley, member from 1921 to 1925, and 1926 to 1935

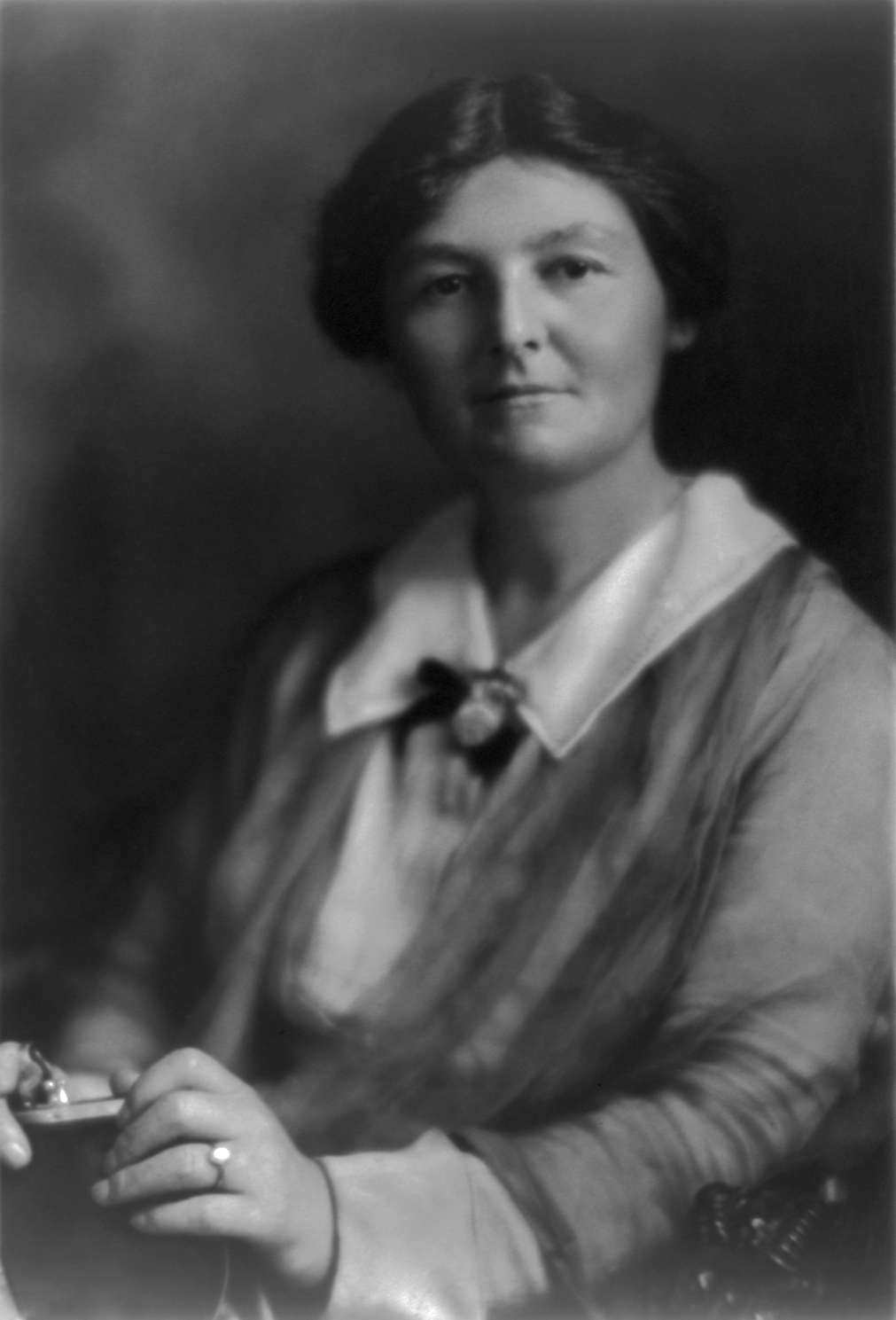
Margaret Bondfield, member from 1921 to 1923, and 1925 to 1929

In 1921, the Women's Trade Union League became the Women's Section of the TUC, and most women's trade unions merged into their counterparts. In exchange, the TUC agreed to create a two-member group, to ensure that women workers had representation on the council. The group was originally numbered 18, and was renumbered on the creation of the Civil Servants Group.

Year	Representative	Union	Representative	Union
1921	Julia Varley	TGWU	Margaret Bondfield	NUGW
1923	Julia Varley	TGWU	Mary Quaile	TGWU
1925	Margaret Bondfield	GMWU	Mary Quaile	TGWU
1926	Margaret Bondfield	GMWU	Julia Varley	TGWU
1929	Anne Loughlin	NUTGW	Julia Varley	TGWU
1935	Anne Loughlin	NUTGW	Florence Hancock	TGWU
1949	Anne Godwin	NUCAW	Florence Hancock	TGWU
1958	Anne Godwin	NUCAW	Ellen McCullough	TGWU
1963	Marie Patterson	TGWU	Winifred Baddeley	AEU
1968	Marie Patterson	TGWU	Audrey Prime	NALGO
1977	Marie Patterson	TGWU	Ada Maddocks	NALGO

The group was expanded to five seats in 1981.

Year	Representative	Union	Representative	Union	Representative	Union	Representative	Union	Representative	Union
1981	Ada Maddocks	NALGO	Gina Morgan	AUEW	Marie Patterson	TGWU	Muriel Turner	ASTMS	Pat Turner	GMB

=== 1983 to present ===
After many years of discussion, a comprehensive restructure of the council was agreed in 1982, and took place following the annual TUC meeting in September 1983. Initially, the new council had 53 members, with those unions with more than 100,000 members gaining automatic seats and therefore becoming eligible to nominate members without them being subject to a vote of other unions. Six seats were initially reserved for women.

==== Section A: Larger unions ====
===== Current members =====
GMB
Year	Representative	Representative	Representative	Representative
1983	David Basnett	Jack Eccles	Ken Baker	3 seats until 1989
1985	David Basnett	Jack Eccles	Dick Pickering	3 seats until 1989
1986	John Edmonds	Derek Oliver Gladwin	Dick Pickering	3 seats until 1989
1989	John Edmonds	Donna Covey	Dick Pickering	Roy Grantham
1992	John Edmonds	Donna Covey	Dick Pickering	Alec Smith
1993	John Edmonds	Donna Covey	Dick Pickering	Frank Wilkinson
1997	John Edmonds	Donna Covey	Sheila Bearcroft	Eddie Warrillow
1999	John Edmonds	Jean Foster	Sheila Bearcroft	Eddie Warrillow
2000	John Edmonds	Jean Foster	Sheila Bearcroft	Paul Kenny
2003	Kevin Curran	Jean Foster	Sheila Bearcroft	Paul Kenny
2004	Kevin Curran	3 seats 2004-2009	Sheila Bearcroft	Paul Kenny
2005	Allan Garley	3 seats 2004-2009	Sheila Bearcroft	Paul Kenny
2009	Allan Garley	Malcolm Sage	Sheila Bearcroft	Paul Kenny
2011	Paul McCarthy	Malcolm Sage	Sheila Bearcroft	Paul Kenny
2014	Neil Derrick	Malcolm Sage	Sheila Bearcroft	Tim Roache
2020	Neil Derrick	Malcolm Sage	Sheila Bearcroft	3 seats from 2020
2021	Farzana Jumma	Barbara Plant	Gary Smith	3 seats from 2020

National Association of Schoolmasters Union of Women Teachers (NASUWT)
Year	Representative	Representative
2002	In Section B until 2002	
2002	Nigel de Gruchy	Sue Rogers
2003	Eamonn O'Kane	Sue Rogers
2004	Chris Keates	Sue Rogers
2009	Chris Keates	Jerry Bartlett
2010	Chris Keates	Brian Cookson
2017	Chris Keates	Patrick Roach
2020	Michelle Codrington-Rogers	Patrick Roach
2024	Rashida Din	Patrick Roach
2025	Rashida Din	Matt Wrack
2026	Sharon Calvert	Matt Wrack

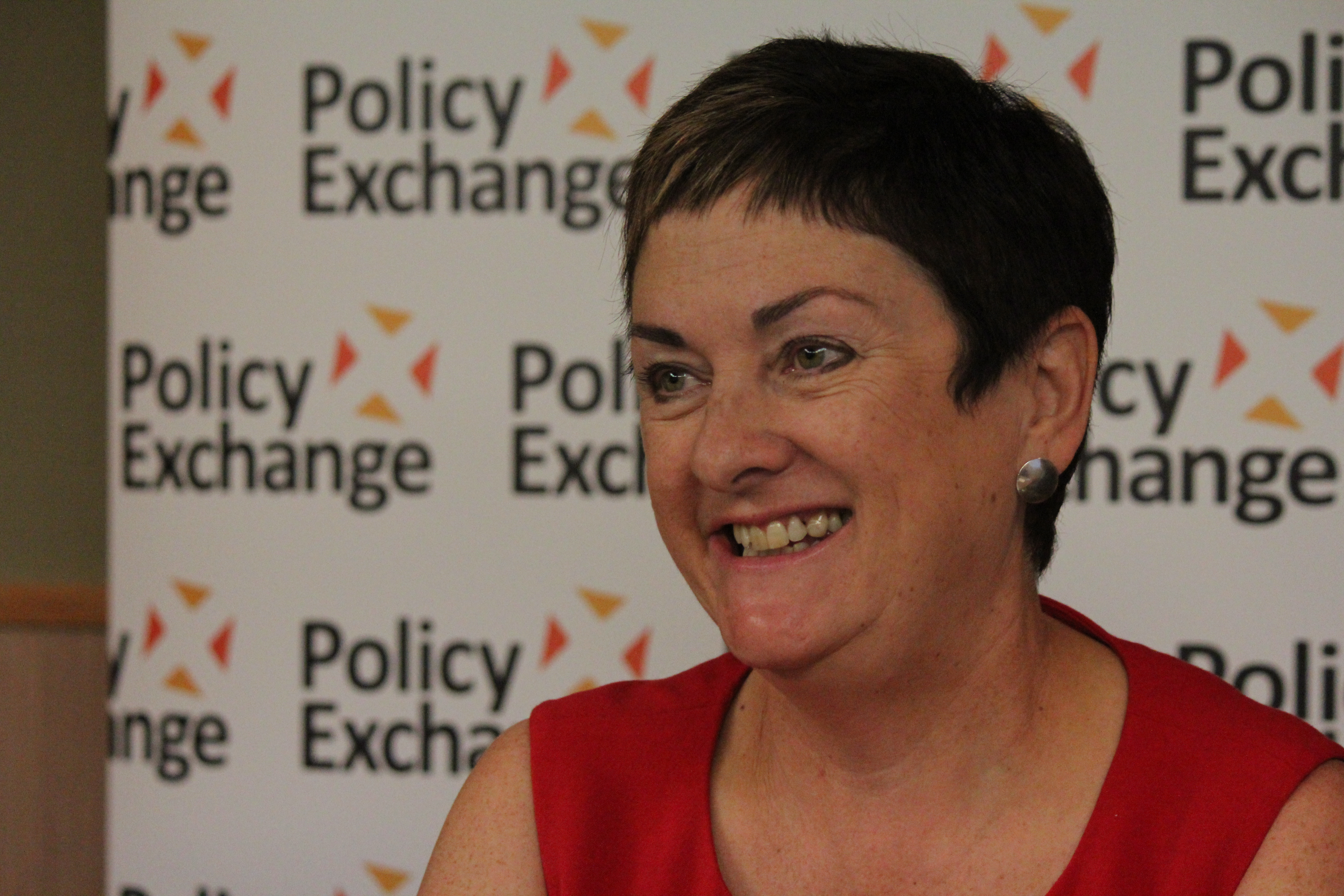
Mary Bousted, member from 2003 to 2023

National Education Union (NEU)
Year	Representative	Representative	Representative
2017	Formed by merger of ATL and NUT		
2017	Mary Bousted	Kevin Courtney	Philipa Harvey
2020	Mary Bousted	Kevin Courtney	Louise Atkinson
2021	Mary Bousted	Kevin Courtney	2 seats from 2021 to 2023
2023	Daniel Kebede	Louise Regan	Niamh Sweeney
2024	Daniel Kebede	Louise Regan	Colleen Johnson

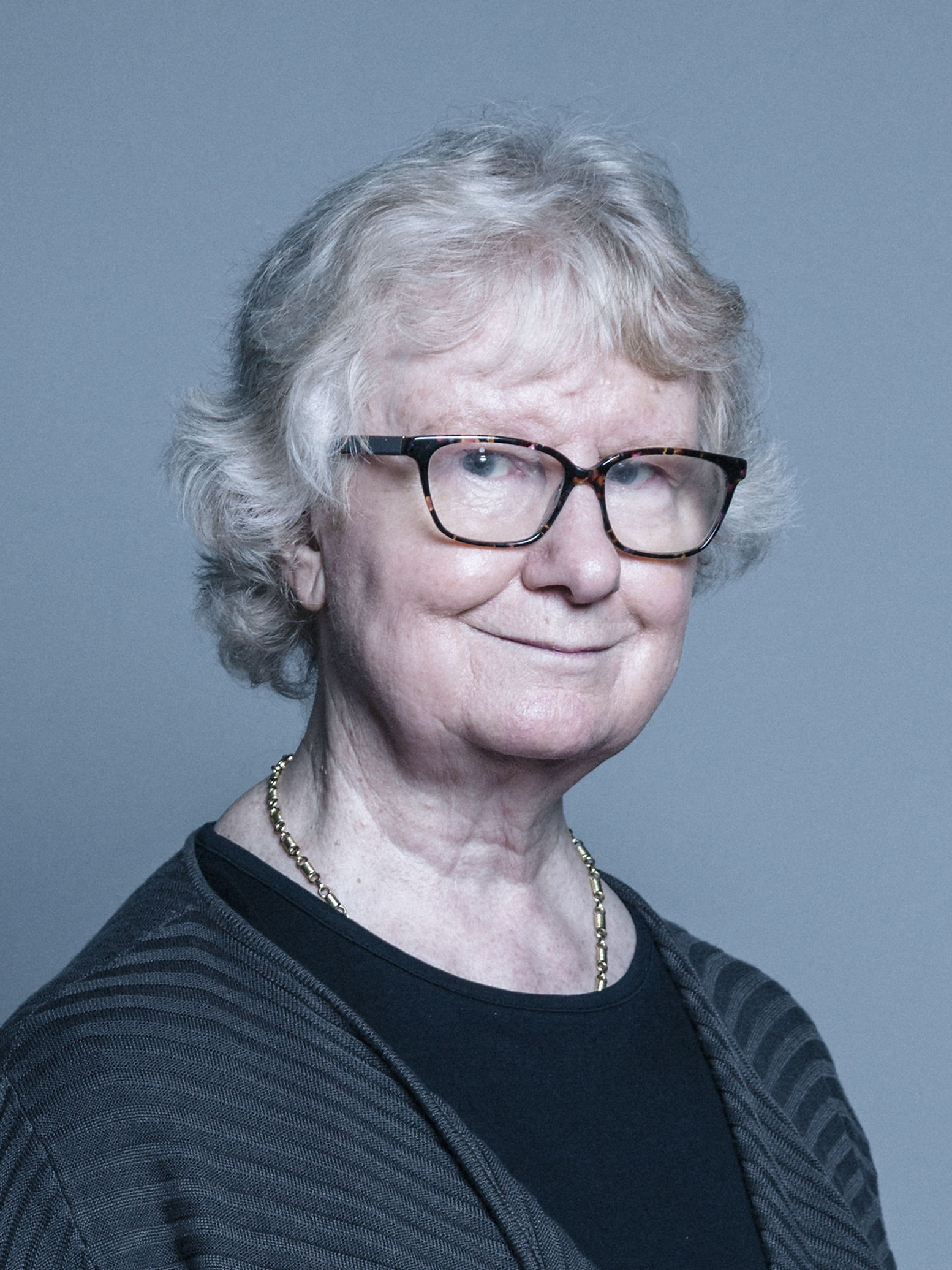
Rita Donaghy, member from 1987 to 2001

UNISON
Year	Representative	Representative	Representative	Representative	Representative	Representative	Representative
1993	Formed by merger of COHSE, NALGO and NUPE						
1993	Rodney Bickerstaffe	Rita Donaghy	Jean Geldart	Ina Love	Alan Jinkinson	Hector Mackenzie	Six seats until 2005
1995	Rodney Bickerstaffe	Rita Donaghy	Alison Shepherd	Chris Connolly	Alan Jinkinson	Hector Mackenzie	Six seats until 2005
1996	Rodney Bickerstaffe	Rita Donaghy	Alison Shepherd	Dave Prentis	Wendy Evans	Hector Mackenzie	Six seats until 2005
2000	Rodney Bickerstaffe	Rita Donaghy	Alison Shepherd	Dave Prentis	David Anderson		Six seats until 2005
2001	Liz Snape	Veronica Dunn	Alison Shepherd	Dave Prentis	David Anderson	Keith Sonnet	Six seats until 2005
2003	Liz Snape	Sofi Taylor	Alison Shepherd	Dave Prentis	David Anderson	Keith Sonnet	Six seats until 2005
2005	Liz Snape	Sofi Taylor	Alison Shepherd	Dave Prentis	Bob Abberley	Keith Sonnet	Jane Carolan
2006	Liz Snape	Six seats in 2006	Alison Shepherd	Dave Prentis	Bob Abberley	Keith Sonnet	Jane Carolan
2007	Liz Snape	Gerry Gallagher	Alison Shepherd	Dave Prentis	Bob Abberley	Eleanor Smith	Jane Carolan
2010	Liz Snape	Angela Lynes	Six seats 2010-2015	Dave Prentis	Bob Abberley	Eleanor Smith	Jane Carolan
2012	Liz Snape	Angela Lynes	Six seats 2010-2015	Dave Prentis	Chris Tansley	Eleanor Smith	Jane Carolan
2013	Liz Snape	Karen Jennings	Six seats 2010-2015	Dave Prentis	Chris Tansley	Eleanor Smith	Jane Carolan
2015	Liz Snape	Karen Jennings	Roger McKenzie	Dave Prentis	Chris Tansley	Eleanor Smith	Jane Carolan
2018	Liz Snape	Josie Bird	Roger McKenzie	Dave Prentis	Chris Tansley	Davena Rankin	Six seats from 2018
2021	Liz Snape	Andrea Egan	Paul Holmes	Christina McAnea	Kath Owen	Tony Wright	Six seats from 2018
2023	Liz Snape	Julia Mwaluke	Libby Nolan	Christina McAnea	Steve North	Tony Wright	Six seats from 2018
2025	Liz Snape	James Anthony	Catherine McKenna	Christina McAnea	Debbie Rowden	Ash Silverstone	Six seats from 2018
2026	Liz Snape	James Anthony	Catherine McKenna	Andrea Egan	Debbie Rowden	Ash Silverstone	

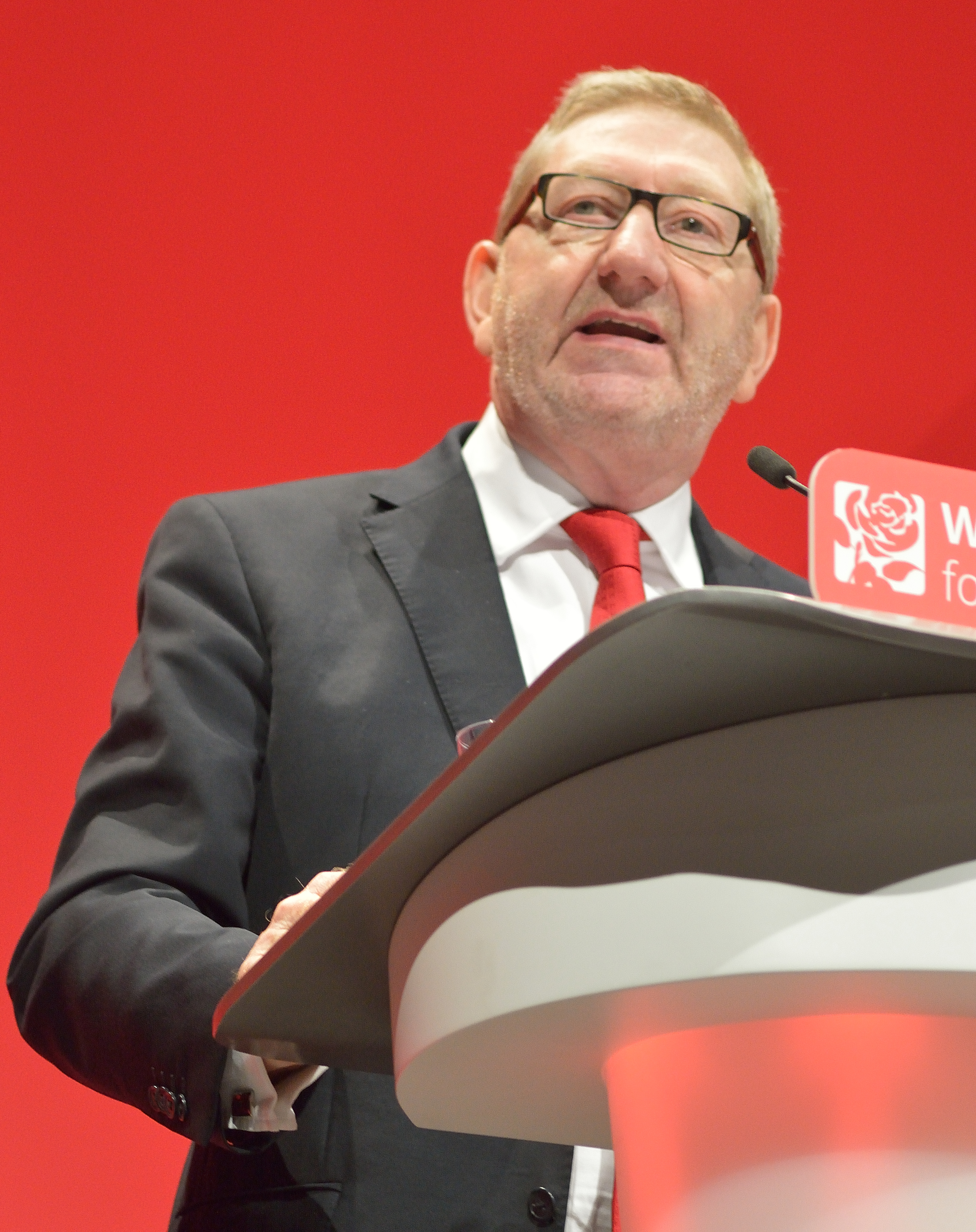
Len McCluskey, member since 2007

Unite
Year	Representative	Representative	Representative	Representative	Representative	Representative	Representative	Representative	Representative	Representative
2007	Formed by merger of Amicus and TGWU									
2007	Gail Cartmail	Tony Dubbins	Len McCluskey	Brenda Sanders	Derek Simpson	Tony Woodley	Pat Stuart	Dougie Rooney	Martin Mayer	Paul Talbot
2008	Gail Cartmail	Tony Burke	Len McCluskey	Tony Woodhouse	Derek Simpson	Tony Woodley	Pat Stuart	Dougie Rooney	Martin Mayer	Paul Talbot
2009	Gail Cartmail	Tony Burke	Len McCluskey	Tony Woodhouse	Derek Simpson	Tony Woodley	Pat Stuart	Dougie Rooney	Reduced to 8 seats	
2011	Gail Cartmail	Tony Burke	Len McCluskey	Tony Woodhouse	Jane Stewart	Steve Turner	Pat Stuart	Andrew Murray	Reduced to 8 seats	
2012	Gail Cartmail	Tony Burke	Len McCluskey	Tony Woodhouse	Jane Stewart	Steve Turner	Pat Stuart	Reduced to 7 seats	Reduced to 8 seats	
2014	Gail Cartmail	Tony Burke	Len McCluskey	Tony Woodhouse	Jane Stewart	Steve Turner	Maggie Ryan	Reduced to 7 seats	Reduced to 8 seats	
2021	Gail Cartmail	Sharon Graham	Reduced to 6 seats	Tony Woodhouse	Jane Stewart	Steve Turner	Maggie Ryan	Reduced to 7 seats	Reduced to 8 seats	
2023	Sarah Carpenter	Sharon Graham	Reduced to 6 seats	Angela Duerden	Andy Green	Steve Turner	Maggie Ryan	Reduced to 7 seats	Reduced to 8 seats	
2025	Sarah Carpenter	Sharon Graham	Reduced to 6 seats	Angela Duerden	Andy Green	Peter Hughes	Maggie Ryan	Reduced to 7 seats	Reduced to 8 seats	
2026	Sarah Carpenter	Sharon Graham	Reduced to 6 seats	Faith Coker-Jarra	Andy Green	Peter Hughes	John Williams	Reduced to 7 seats	Reduced to 8 seats	

Union of Shop, Distributive and Allied Workers (USDAW)
Year	Representative	Representative	Representative
1983	Bill Whatley	One seat until 1989	
1986	Garfield Davies	One seat until 1989	
1989	Garfield Davies	Bernadette Hillon	Two seats until 2012
1997	Bill Connor	Bernadette Hillon	Two seats until 2012
1998	Bill Connor	Marge Carey	Two seats until 2012
2004	John Hannett	Marge Carey	Two seats until 2012
2006	John Hannett	Pauline Foulkes	Two seats until 2012
2007	John Hannett	Fiona Wilson	Two seats until 2012
2012	John Hannett	Fiona Wilson	Tony Dale
2018	Ruth Cross	Paddy Lillis	Tony Dale
2021	Ruth Cross	Paddy Lillis	Joanne Cairns
2023	Two seats from 2023	Paddy Lillis	Joanne Cairns
2025	Two seats from 2023	Joanne Thomas	Joanne Cairns

===== Former members =====
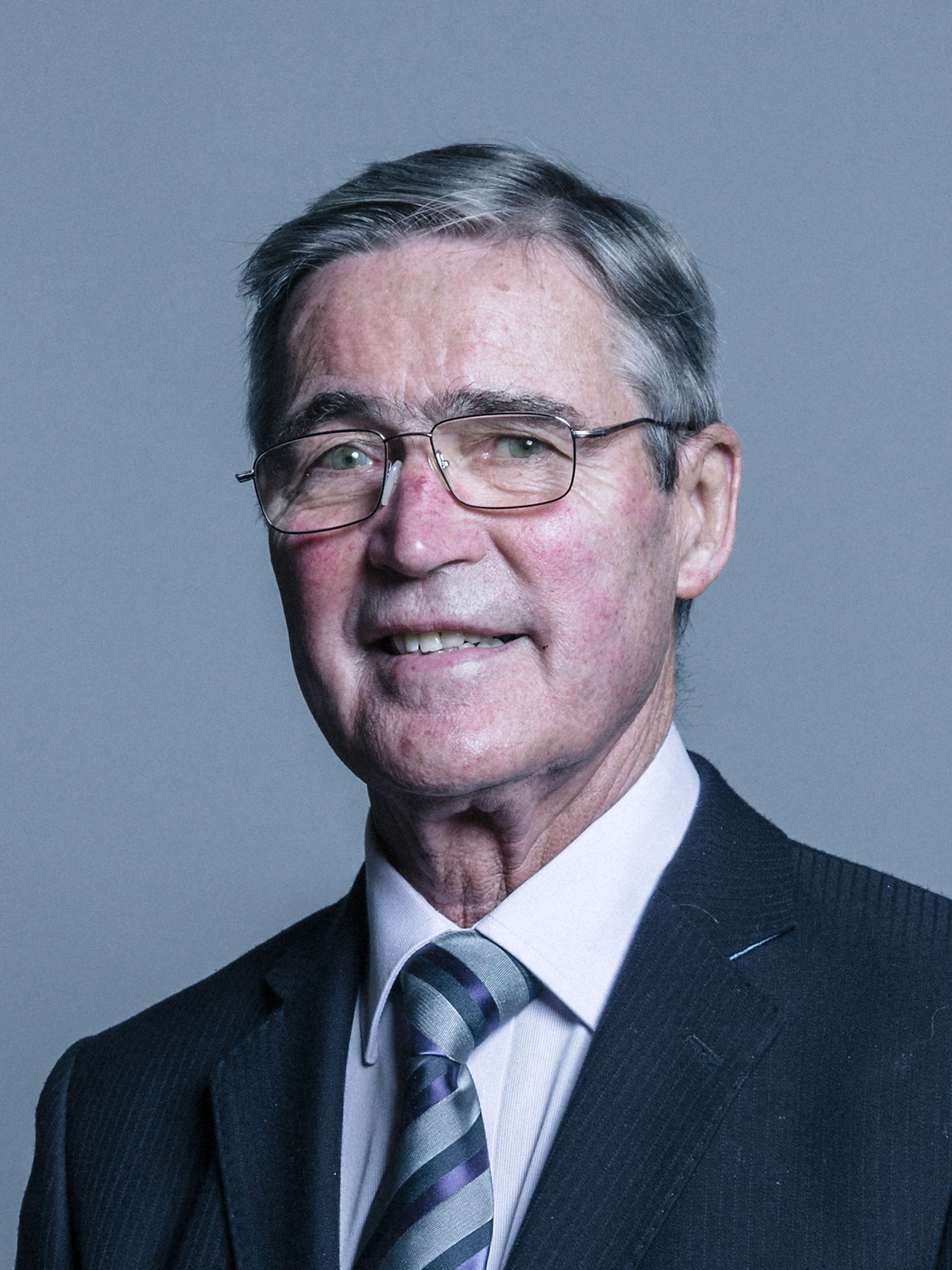
Bill Jordan, member from 1986 to 1995

AEU/AEEU
Year	Representative	Representative	Representative	Representative
1983	Terence Duffy	Edward Scrivens	Gerry Russell	Jack Whyman
1984	Terence Duffy	Edward Scrivens	Gerry Russell	3 seats in 1984
1985	Terence Duffy	Edward Scrivens	Gerry Russell	Jack Whyman
1986	Bill Jordan	3 seats 1986-1988	Gerry Russell	Jack Whyman
1987	Bill Jordan	3 seats 1986-1988	John Weakley	Jack Whyman
1989	Bill Jordan	Gina Morgan	John Weakley	Jack Whyman
1990	Bill Jordan	Jimmy Airlie	John Weakley	Maureen Rooney
1992	Bill Jordan	3 seats in 1992	John Weakley	Maureen Rooney
1993	Bill Jordan	Jimmy Airlie	John Weakley	Maureen Rooney
1994	Bill Jordan	Ken Jackson	John Weakley	Maureen Rooney
1995	John Allen	Ken Jackson	Bill Morgan	Maureen Rooney
1996	Robert Elsom	Ken Jackson	Davey Hall	Maureen Rooney
1998	Dougie Rooney	Ken Jackson	Brendan Fenelon	Maureen Rooney
1999	Dougie Rooney	Ken Jackson	Mark Tami	Maureen Rooney
2001	Merged with MSF to form Amicus			

Amicus
Year	Representative	Representative	Representative	Representative	Representative	Representative	Representative
2001	Formed by merger of AEEU and MSF						
2001	Roger Lyons	Dougie Rooney	Maureen Rooney	Paul Talbot	?		
2002	Roger Lyons	Dougie Rooney	Maureen Rooney	Paul Talbot	Sharon Allen	Danny Carrigan	Ken Jackson
2003	Roger Lyons	Dougie Rooney	Linda McCulloch	Paul Talbot	Derek Simpson	Five seats in 2003	
2004	Roger Lyons	Dougie Rooney	Lucy Kelly	Paul Talbot	Derek Simpson	Ed Sweeney	Six seats from 2004
2005	Gail Cartmail	Dougie Rooney	Tony Dubbins	Paul Talbot	Derek Simpson	Ed Sweeney	Six seats from 2004
2007	Merged with TGWU to form Unite	Dougie Rooney					

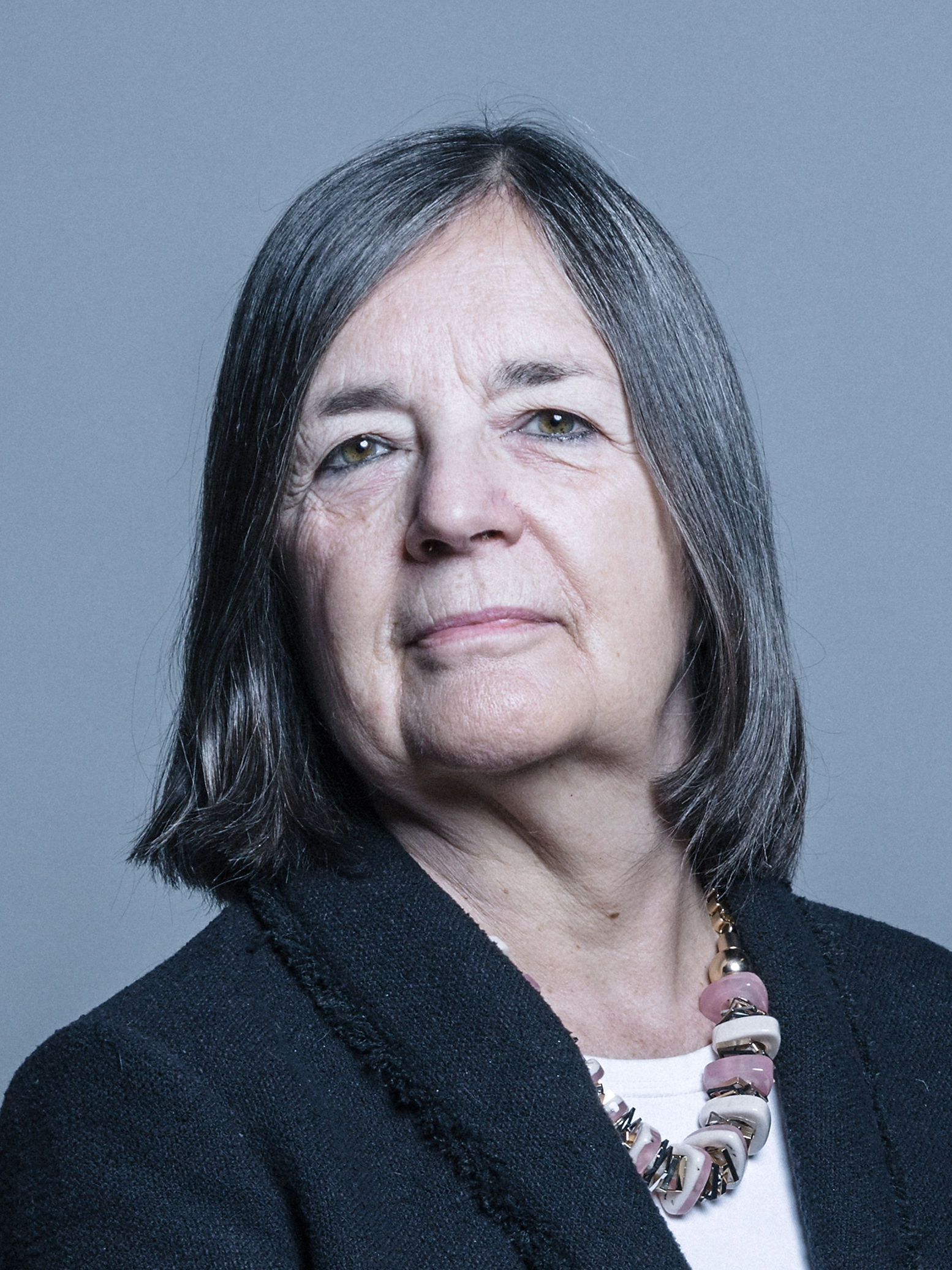
Jeannie Drake, member from 1990 to 2008

Communication Workers' Union (CWU)
Year	Representative	Representative
1995	Formed by merger of NCU and UCW	
1995	Tony Young	Jeannie Drake
2002	Billy Hayes	Jeannie Drake
2008	Billy Hayes	Tony Kearns
2015	Moved to Section B	

Confederation of Health Service Employees (COHSE)
Year	Representative	Representative
1983	David Williams	1 seat until 1989
1987	Hector Mackenzie	1 seat until 1989
1989	Hector Mackenzie	Judith Carter
1993	Merged with NALGO and NUPE to form UNISON	

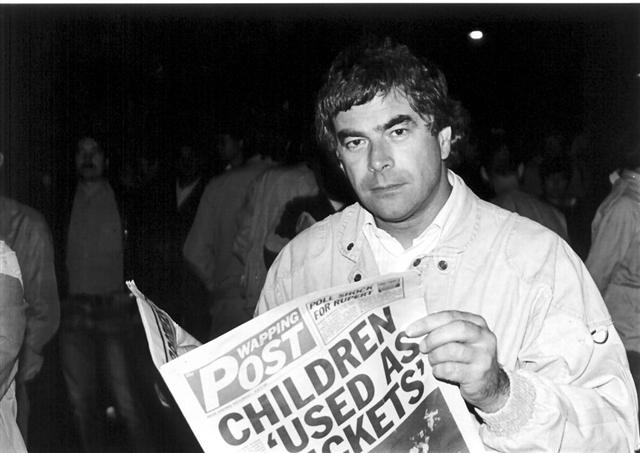
Tony Dubbins, member from 1984 to 1988, and 1992 to 2008

Graphical, Paper and Media Union (GPMU)
Year	Representative	Representative
1992	Formed by merger of NGA and SOGAT	
1992	Dennis Hill	Tony Dubbins
1993	Tony Burke	Tony Dubbins
2002	Moved to Section B	

Manufacturing, Science and Finance (MSF)
Year	Representative	Representative	Representative	Representative
1988	Formed by merger of ASTMS and TASS			
1988	Anne Gibson	Ken Gill	Two seats until 1989	
1989	Anne Gibson	Ken Gill	Roger Lyons	Jack Carr
1992	Anne Gibson	Three seats from 1992	Roger Lyons	Jack Carr
1993	Anne Gibson	Three seats from 1992	Roger Lyons	Barbara Switzer
1999	Anne Gibson	Three seats from 1992	Roger Lyons	Paul Talbot
2000	Sharon Allen	Three seats from 1992	Roger Lyons	Paul Talbot
2001	Merged with AEEU to form Amicus			

National and Local Government Officers' Association (NALGO)
Year	Representative	Representative	Representative	Representative
1983	Bill Gill	John Daly	Norrie Steele	3 seats until 1989
1987	Rita Donaghy	John Daly	Norrie Steele	3 seats until 1989
1989	Rita Donaghy	John Daly	Norrie Steele	Ada Maddocks
1990	Rita Donaghy	Alan Jinkinson	Norrie Steele	Ada Maddocks
1991	Rita Donaghy	Alan Jinkinson	Jean Geldart	Jim White
1993	Merged with COHSE and NUPE to form UNISON			

National Union of Public Employees (NUPE)
Year	Representative	Representative	Representative
1983	Rodney Bickerstaffe	Lily Stevens	2 seats until 1989
1984	Rodney Bickerstaffe	Dilwyn Davies	2 seats until 1989
1985	Rodney Bickerstaffe	B. Ward	2 seats until 1989
1986	Rodney Bickerstaffe	Joyce Winsett	2 seats until 1989
1987	Rodney Bickerstaffe	Ron Baird	2 seats until 1989
1988	Rodney Bickerstaffe	Michael Page	2 seats until 1989
1989	Rodney Bickerstaffe	Michael Page	Ina Love
1990	Rodney Bickerstaffe	Bill Thorburn	Ina Love
1991	Rodney Bickerstaffe	Jean Biggs	Ina Love
1992	Anna McGonigle		
1993	Merged with COHSE and NALGO to form UNISON		

National Union of Teachers (NUT)
Year	Representative	Representative
2001	In Section B until 2001	
2001	Pat Hawkes	Doug McAvoy
2004	Pat Hawkes	Steve Sinnott
2005	Lesley Auger	Steve Sinnott
2008	Christine Blower	Dave Harvey
2016	Kevin Courtney	Philipa Harvey
2017	Merged with ATL to form NEU	

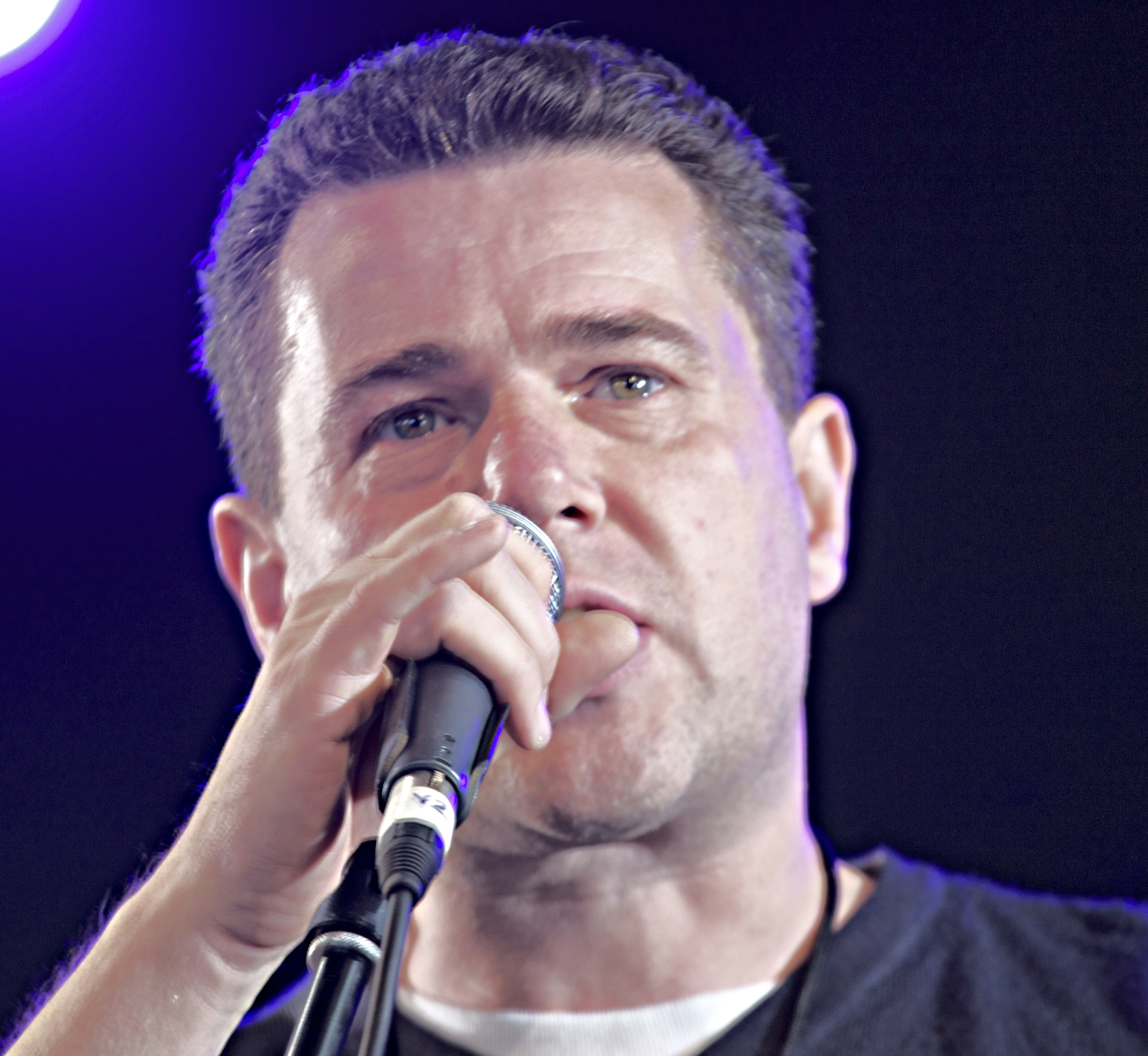
Mark Serwotka, member since 2002

Public and Commercial Services Union (PCS)
Year	Representative	Representative
1998	Formed by merger of CPSA and PSTCU	
1998	Gwenda Binks	Barry Reamsbottom
2002	Janice Godrich	Mark Serwotka
2016	Moved to Section B	

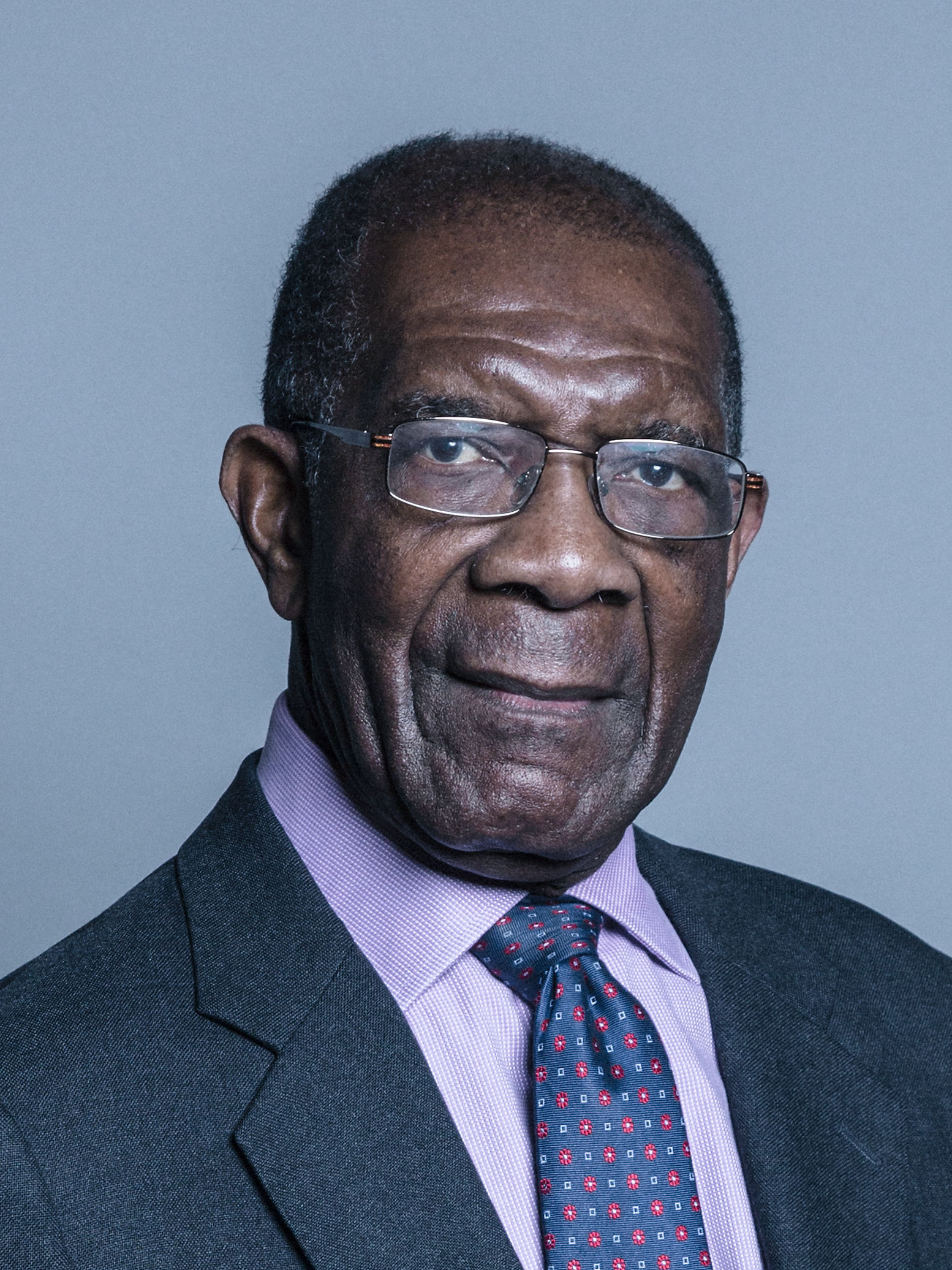
Bill Morris, member from 1988 to 2003

Transport and General Workers' Union (TGWU)
Year	Representative	Representative	Representative	Representative	Representative	Representative
1983	Douglas Gray	Walter Greendale	Brian Nicholson	Larry Smith	Moss Evans	5 seats 1983 to 1984
1984	Ron Todd	Walter Greendale	Brian Nicholson	Larry Smith	Moss Evans	5 seats 1983 to 1984
1985	Ron Todd	Walter Greendale	Brian Nicholson	Larry Smith	4 seats 1985 to 1989	
1986	Ron Todd	Wilf Jowett	Brian Nicholson	Larry Smith	4 seats 1985 to 1989	
1988	Ron Todd	Peter Hagger	Bill Morris	Daniel Duffy	4 seats 1985 to 1989	
1989	Ron Todd	Peter Hagger	Bill Morris	Daniel Duffy	Margaret Prosser	Maureen Twomey
1992	Jack Adams	Peter Hagger	Bill Morris	5 seats 1992 to 1995	Margaret Prosser	Maureen Twomey
1995	Jack Adams	Peter Landles	Bill Morris	5 seats 1992 to 1995	Margaret Prosser	Maureen Twomey
1996	Jack Adams	Peter Landles	Bill Morris	4 seats from 1996		Maureen Twomey
1997	Jack Adams	Peter Landles	Bill Morris	4 seats from 1996		Marie Vannet
2000	Barry Camfield	Peter Landles	Bill Morris	4 seats from 1996		Marie Vannet
2002	Barry Camfield	Peter Landles	Bill Morris	4 seats from 1996		Jane McKay
2003	Barry Camfield	Peter Landles	Tony Woodley	4 seats from 1996		Jane McKay
2004	Barry Camfield	Jimmy Kelly	Tony Woodley	4 seats from 1996		Patricia Stuart
2005	Merged with Amicus to form Unite					

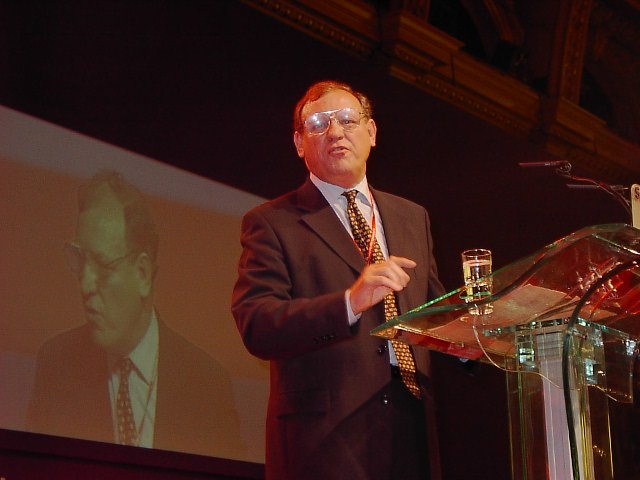
George Brumwell, member from 1988 to 2002

Union of Construction, Allied Trades and Technicians (UCATT)
Year	Representative	Representative
1983	Les Wood	1 seat until 1989
1985	Albert Williams	1 seat until 1989
1989	Albert Williams	Jack Henry
1991	Albert Williams	Peter Lenahan
1992	George Brumwell	Peter Lenahan
1993	Moved to Section B	

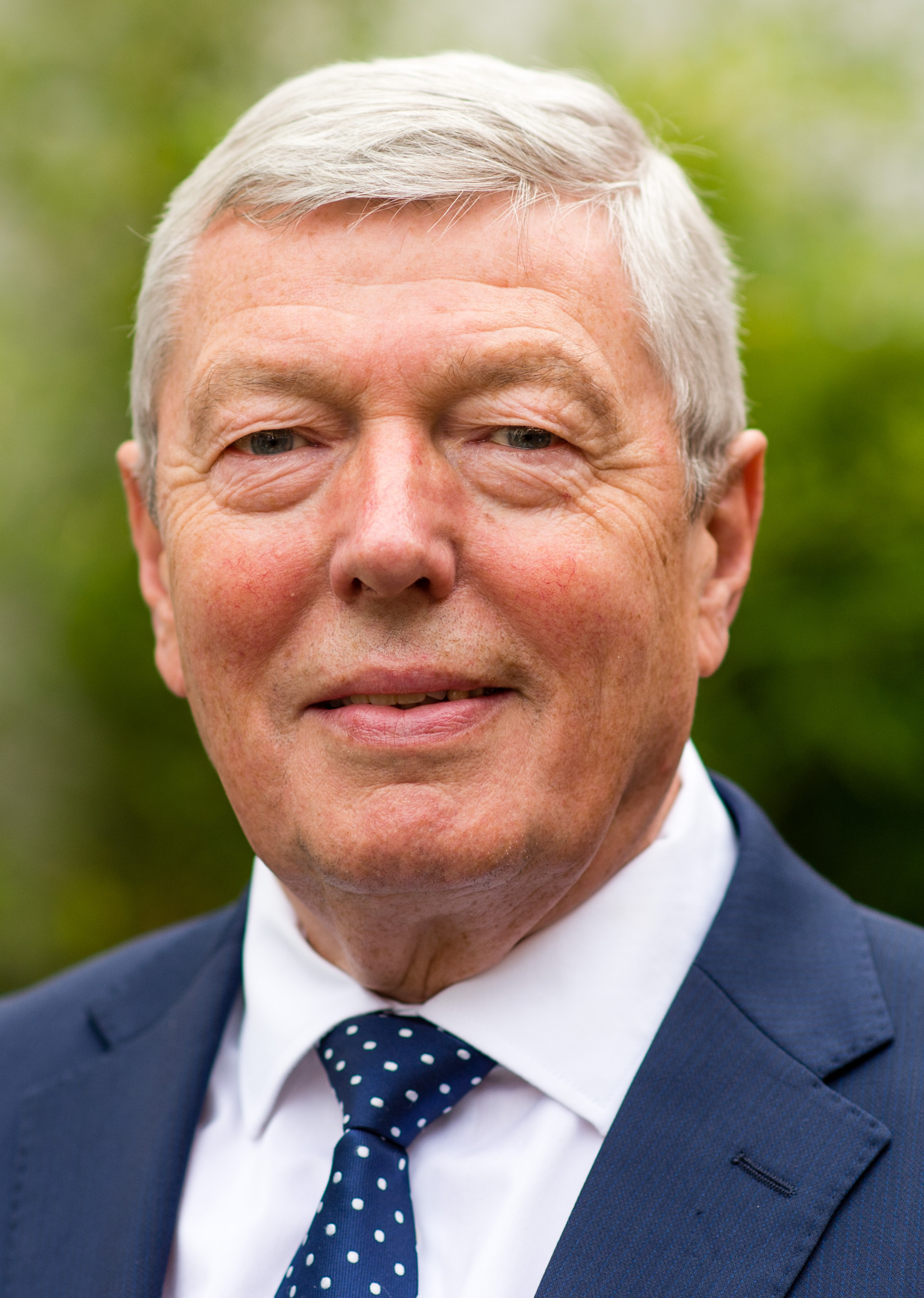
Alan Johnson, member from 1993 to 1995

Union of Communication Workers (UCW)
Year	Representative	Representative
1983	Alan Tuffin	1 seat until 1990
1990	Alan Tuffin	Margaret Morritt
1992	Alan Tuffin	1 seat from 1992
1993	Alan Johnson	1 seat from 1992
1995	Merged with NCU to form CWU	

==== Section B: Unions with 30,000 to 200,000 members ====
Section B originated as part of Section A, unions with 100,000 to 200,000 members being automatically entitled to one seat on the council.

Year	APEX	ASTMS	BIFU	CPSA	EETPU	NASUWT	NGA	NUM	NUR	NUT	POEU/ NCU	SOGAT	TASS
1983	Roy Grantham	Clive Jenkins	Leif Mills	Alistair Graham	Eric Hammond	Fred Smithies	Joe Wade	Mick McGahey	Jimmy Knapp	Fred Jarvis	Bryan Stanley	Bill Keys	Ken Gill
1984	Roy Grantham	Clive Jenkins	Leif Mills	Ray Alderson	Eric Hammond	Fred Smithies	Tony Dubbins	Mick McGahey	Jimmy Knapp	Fred Jarvis	Bryan Stanley	Bill Keys	Ken Gill
1985	Roy Grantham	Clive Jenkins	Leif Mills	Alistair Graham	Eric Hammond	Fred Smithies	Tony Dubbins	Mick McGahey	Jimmy Knapp	Fred Jarvis	Bryan Stanley	Brenda Dean	Ken Gill
1986	Roy Grantham	Clive Jenkins	Leif Mills	Kate Losinska	Eric Hammond	Fred Smithies	Tony Dubbins	Arthur Scargill	Jimmy Knapp	Fred Jarvis	John Golding	Brenda Dean	Ken Gill
1987	Roy Grantham	Clive Jenkins	Leif Mills	John Macreadie	Expelled in 1987	Fred Smithies	Tony Dubbins	Arthur Scargill	Jimmy Knapp	Fred Jarvis	John Golding	Brenda Dean	Ken Gill
1988	Roy Grantham	Merged into MSF	Leif Mills	John Ellis	Expelled in 1987	Fred Smithies	Tony Dubbins	Moved to Section B in 1988	Jimmy Knapp	Fred Jarvis	E. George	Brenda Dean	Merged into MSF

In 1989, these unions were moved to a new Section B, but there were no changes to their entitlement of seats.

Year	ATL	CPSA	GPMU	NASUWT	NCU	NUCPS	NUR	NUT	Prospect	SOGAT	UCATT	UCU	UNIFI
1989	Affiliated 1998	John Ellis	Section A until 2002	Nigel de Gruchy	Anthony Young	Leslie Christie	Jimmy Knapp	Doug McAvoy	Founded 2001	Brenda Dean	Section A until 1993	Founded 2006	Leif Mills
1992	Affiliated 1998	Barry Reamsbottom	Section A until 2002	Nigel de Gruchy	Anthony Young	John Sheldon	Moved to Section C	Doug McAvoy	Founded 2001	Merged into GPMU	Section A until 1993	Founded 2006	Leif Mills
1993	Affiliated 1998	Barry Reamsbottom	Section A until 2002	Nigel de Gruchy	Anthony Young	John Sheldon	Moved to Section C	Doug McAvoy	Founded 2001	Merged into GPMU	George Brumwell	Founded 2006	Leif Mills
1995	Affiliated 1998	Barry Reamsbottom	Section A until 2002	Nigel de Gruchy	Merged into CWU	John Sheldon	Moved to Section C	Doug McAvoy	Founded 2001	Merged into GPMU	George Brumwell	Founded 2006	Leif Mills
1996	Affiliated 1998	Barry Reamsbottom	Section A until 2002	Nigel de Gruchy	Merged into CWU	Merged into PSTCU	Moved to Section C	Doug McAvoy	Founded 2001	Merged into GPMU	George Brumwell	Founded 2006	Ed Sweeney
1998	Peter Smith	Merged into PCS	Section A until 2002	Nigel de Gruchy	Merged into CWU	Merged into PSTCU	Moved to Section C	Doug McAvoy	Founded 2001	Merged into GPMU	George Brumwell	Founded 2006	Ed Sweeney
2000	Peter Smith	Merged into PCS	Section A until 2002	Nigel de Gruchy	Merged into CWU	Merged into PSTCU	Moved to Section C	Doug McAvoy	Founded 2001	Merged into GPMU	George Brumwell	Founded 2006	Ed Sweeney
2001	Peter Smith	Merged into PCS	Section A until 2002	Nigel de Gruchy	Merged into CWU	Merged into PSTCU	Moved to Section C	Moved to Section A	Paul Noon	Merged into GPMU	George Brumwell	Founded 2006	Ed Sweeney
2002	Peter Smith	Merged into PCS	Tony Dubbins	Moved to Section A	Merged into CWU	Merged into PSTCU	Moved to Section C	Moved to Section A	Paul Noon	Merged into GPMU	George Brumwell	Founded 2006	Ed Sweeney
2003	Mary Bousted	Merged into PCS	Tony Dubbins	Moved to Section A	Merged into CWU	Merged into PSTCU	Moved to Section C	Moved to Section A	Paul Noon	Merged into GPMU	George Brumwell	Founded 2006	Ed Sweeney
2004	Mary Bousted	Merged into PCS	Tony Dubbins	Moved to Section A	Merged into CWU	Merged into PSTCU	Moved to Section C	Moved to Section A	Paul Noon	Merged into GPMU	George Brumwell	Founded 2006	Merged into Amicus
2005	Mary Bousted	Merged into PCS	Merged into Amicus	Moved to Section A	Merged into CWU	Merged into PSTCU	Moved to Section C	Moved to Section A	Paul Noon	Merged into GPMU	Alan Ritchie	Founded 2006	Merged into Amicus
2006	Mary Bousted	Merged into PCS	Merged into Amicus	Moved to Section A	Merged into CWU	Merged into PSTCU	Moved to Section C	Moved to Section A	Paul Noon	Merged into GPMU	Alan Ritchie	Sally Hunt	Merged into Amicus
2011	Mary Bousted	Merged into PCS	Merged into Amicus	Moved to Section A	Merged into CWU	Merged into PSTCU	Moved to Section C	Moved to Section A	Paul Noon	Merged into GPMU	George Guy	Sally Hunt	Merged into Amicus

Unions with 30,000 to 99,999 members moved to Section B in 2012.

Year	ATL	CSP	Community	CWU	EIS	Equity	FBU	MU	NAHT	NUJ	POA	Prospect	PCS	RCM	RMT	SoR	UCATT	UCU
2012	Mary Bousted	Lesley Mercer	Michael J. Leahy	Section A until 2015	Larry Flanagan	Christine Payne	Matt Wrack	John F. Smith	Section C until 2019	Michelle Stanistreet	Steve Gillan	Mike Clancy	Section A until 2016	Affiliated 2015	Bob Crow	Section C until 2023	Steve Murphy	Sally Hunt
2013	Mary Bousted	Lesley Mercer	Michael J. Leahy	Section A until 2015	Larry Flanagan	Christine Payne	Matt Wrack	John F. Smith	Section C until 2019	Michelle Stanistreet	Steve Gillan	Mike Clancy	Section A until 2016	Affiliated 2015	Bob Crow	Section C until 2023	Steve Murphy	Sally Hunt
2014	Mary Bousted	Claire Sullivan	Roy Rickhuss	Section A until 2015	Larry Flanagan	Christine Payne	Matt Wrack	John F. Smith	Section C until 2019	Michelle Stanistreet	Steve Gillan	Mike Clancy	Section A until 2016	Affiliated 2015	Peter Pinkney	Section C until 2023	Steve Murphy	Sally Hunt
2015	Mary Bousted	Claire Sullivan	Roy Rickhuss	Dave Ward	Larry Flanagan	Christine Payne	Matt Wrack	John F. Smith	Section C until 2019	In Section C in 2015	Steve Gillan	Mike Clancy	Section A until 2016	Jon Skewes	Mick Cash	Section C until 2023	Brian Rye	Sally Hunt
2016	Mary Bousted	Claire Sullivan	Roy Rickhuss	Dave Ward	Larry Flanagan	Christine Payne	Matt Wrack	John F. Smith	Section C until 2019	Michelle Stanistreet	Steve Gillan	Mike Clancy	Mark Serwotka	Jon Skewes	Mick Cash	Section C until 2023	Brian Rye	Sally Hunt
2017	Merged into NEU in 2017	Claire Sullivan	Roy Rickhuss	Dave Ward	Larry Flanagan	Christine Payne	Matt Wrack	Horace Trubridge	Section C until 2019	Michelle Stanistreet	Steve Gillan	Mike Clancy	Mark Serwotka	Jon Skewes	Mick Cash	Section C until 2023	Merged into Unite in 2017	Sally Hunt
2018	Merged into NEU in 2017	Claire Sullivan	Roy Rickhuss	Dave Ward	Larry Flanagan	Christine Payne	Matt Wrack	Horace Trubridge	Section C until 2019	Michelle Stanistreet	Steve Gillan	Mike Clancy	Mark Serwotka	Jon Skewes	Mick Cash	Section C until 2023	Merged into Unite in 2017	Sally Hunt
2019	Merged into NEU in 2017	Claire Sullivan	Roy Rickhuss	Dave Ward	Larry Flanagan	Christine Payne	Matt Wrack	Horace Trubridge	Paul Whiteman	Michelle Stanistreet	Steve Gillan	Mike Clancy	Mark Serwotka	Jon Skewes	Mick Cash	Section C until 2023	Merged into Unite in 2017	Jo Grady
2020	Merged into NEU in 2017	Claire Sullivan	Roy Rickhuss	Dave Ward	Larry Flanagan	Stephen Spence	Matt Wrack	Horace Trubridge	Paul Whiteman	Michelle Stanistreet	Steve Gillan	Mike Clancy	Mark Serwotka	Jon Skewes	Mick Cash	Section C until 2023	Merged into Unite in 2017	Jo Grady
2021	Merged into NEU in 2017	Claire Sullivan	Roy Rickhuss	Dave Ward	Larry Flanagan	Paul W. Fleming	Matt Wrack	Horace Trubridge	Paul Whiteman	Section C from 2021	Steve Gillan	Mike Clancy	Mark Serwotka	Jon Skewes	Mick Lynch	Section C until 2023	Merged into Unite in 2017	Jo Grady
2022	Merged into NEU in 2017	Claire Sullivan	Roy Rickhuss	Dave Ward	Larry Flanagan	Paul W. Fleming	Matt Wrack	Naomi Pohl	Paul Whiteman	Section C from 2021	Steve Gillan	Mike Clancy	Mark Serwotka	Suzanne Tyler	Mick Lynch	Section C until 2023	Merged into Unite in 2017	Jo Grady
2023	Merged into NEU in 2017	Claire Sullivan	Roy Rickhuss	Dave Ward	Andrea Bradley	Paul W. Fleming	Matt Wrack	Naomi Pohl	Paul Whiteman	Section C from 2021	Steve Gillan	Mike Clancy	Mark Serwotka	Suzanne Tyler	Mick Lynch	Dean Rogers	Merged into Unite in 2017	Jo Grady
2024	Merged into NEU in 2017	Claire Sullivan	Roy Rickhuss	Dave Ward	Andrea Bradley	Paul W. Fleming	Matt Wrack	Naomi Pohl	Paul Whiteman	Section C from 2021	Steve Gillan	Mike Clancy	Fran Heathcote	Amanda Brown	Mick Lynch	Dean Rogers	Merged into Unite in 2017	Jo Grady
2025	Merged into NEU in 2017	Claire Sullivan	Alasdair McDiarmid	Dave Ward	Andrea Bradley	Paul W. Fleming	Steve Wright	Naomi Pohl	Paul Whiteman	Section C from 2021	Steve Gillan	Mike Clancy	Fran Heathcote	Robbie Turner	Eddie Dempsey	Dean Rogers	Merged into Unite in 2017	Jo Grady

==== Section C: Other unions ====
Unions with fewer than 100,000 members were placed in Section B until 1989.

Year	Name	Union	Name	Union	Name	Union	Name	Union	Name	Union	Name	Union	Name	Union	Name	Union	Name	Union	Name	Union	Name	Union
1983	Ray Buckton	ASLEF	Ken Cameron	FBU	Tony Christopher	IRSF	Bob Garland	AEU-Foundry	Doug Grieve	TWU	John Lyons	EMA	Charles P. McCarthy	NSMM	John Morton	MU	Laurie Sapper	ACTT	Bill Sirs	ISTC	Alec Smith	NUTGW
1984	Ray Buckton	ASLEF	David Lambert	KFAT	Tony Christopher	IRSF	Bill McCall	IPCS	Bob Stevenson	NUFLAT	John Lyons	EMA	Charles P. McCarthy	NSMM	John Morton	MU	Bert Lyons	TSSA	Bill Sirs	ISTC	Alec Smith	NUTGW
1985	Ray Buckton	ASLEF	David Lambert	KFAT	Tony Christopher	IRSF	Bill McCall	IPCS	Bob Stevenson	NUFLAT	John Lyons	EMA	Roy Evans	ISTC	Roy Grantham	APEX	Bert Lyons	TSSA	Eric Nevin	MNAOA	Alec Smith	NUTGW
1986	John Morton	MU	David Lambert	KFAT	Tony Christopher	IRSF	Bill McCall	IPCS	Bob Stevenson	NUFLAT	John Lyons	EMA	Roy Evans	ISTC	Roy Grantham	APEX	Bert Lyons	TSSA	Eric Nevin	MNAOA	Alec Smith	NUTGW
1987	John Morton	MU	David Lambert	KFAT	Tony Christopher	IRSF	Bill McCall	IPCS	Bob Stevenson	NUFLAT	John Lyons	EMA	Roy Evans	ISTC	Roy Grantham	APEX	Bert Lyons	TSSA	Eric Nevin	MNAOA	Alec Smith	NUTGW
1988	John Morton	MU	David Lambert	KFAT	Tony Christopher	IRSF	Bill McCall	IPCS	Bob Stevenson	NUFLAT	John Lyons	EMA	Roy Evans	ISTC	Roy Grantham	APEX	Bert Lyons	TSSA	Eric Nevin	MNAOA	Alec Smith	NUTGW

In 1989, the section for small unions was renamed Section C, and was reduced to eight members.

Year	Name	Union	Name	Union	Name	Union	Name	Union	Name	Union	Name	Union	Name	Union	Name	Union
1989	Bill Brett	IPMS	Clive Brooke	IRSF	Roy Evans	ISTC	David Lambert	KFAT	John Lyons	EMA	John Morton	MU	Alec Smith	NUTGW	Bob Stevenson	NUFLAT
1990	Bill Brett	IPMS	Clive Brooke	IRSF	Roy Evans	ISTC	David Lambert	KFAT	John Lyons	EMA	Dennis Scard	MU	Alec Smith	NUTGW	John Newman	NUMAST
1991	Bill Brett	IPMS	Clive Brooke	IRSF	Roy Evans	ISTC	David Lambert	KFAT	Ken Cameron	FBU	Dennis Scard	MU	David Evans	POA	John Newman	NUMAST
1992	Bill Brett	IPMS	Clive Brooke	IRSF	Keith Brookman	ISTC	David Lambert	KFAT	Ken Cameron	FBU	Dennis Scard	MU	David Evans	POA	Reduced to 7 seats in 1992	
1993	Bill Brett	IPMS	Clive Brooke	IRSF	Keith Brookman	ISTC	Jimmy Knapp	RMT	Ken Cameron	FBU	Dennis Scard	MU	David Evans	POA	Reduced to 7 seats in 1992	
1996	Bill Brett	IPMS	Tony Cooper	EMA	Keith Brookman	ISTC	Jimmy Knapp	RMT	Ken Cameron	FBU	Dennis Scard	MU	David Evans	POA	Reduced to 7 seats in 1992	
1998	John Chowcat	NAEIAC	Tony Cooper	EMA	Keith Brookman	ISTC	Jimmy Knapp	RMT	Ken Cameron	FBU	Dennis Scard	MU	David Evans	POA	Reduced to 7 seats in 1992	
1999	Michael J. Leahy	Community	Tony Cooper	EMA	Brian Orrell	NUMAST	Jimmy Knapp	RMT	Ken Cameron	FBU	Dennis Scard	MU	David Evans	POA	Reduced to 7 seats in 1992	
2000	Michael J. Leahy	Community	Andy Gilchrist	FBU	Brian Orrell	NUMAST	Jimmy Knapp	RMT	Ged Nichols	Accord	Dennis Scard	MU	Richard Rosser	TSSA	Reduced to 7 seats in 1992	

Increased to 11 members in 2001.

Year	Name	Union	Name	Union	Name	Union	Name	Union	Name	Union	Name	Union	Name	Union	Name	Union	Name	Union	Name	Union	Name	Union
2001	Jonathan Baume	FDA	Brian Caton	POA	Paul Gates	KFAT	Andy Gilchrist	FBU	Michael J. Leahy	Community	Judy McKnight	NAPO	Ged Nichols	Accord	Paul Noon	IMPS	Brian Orrell	NUMAST	Mick Rix	ASLEF	Richard Rosser	TSSA
2002	Jonathan Baume	FDA	Brian Caton	POA	Jeremy Dear	NUJ	Andy Gilchrist	FBU	Michael J. Leahy	Community	Judy McKnight	NAPO	Ged Nichols	Accord	Paul Mackney	NATFHE	Brian Orrell	NUMAST	Mick Rix	ASLEF	Richard Rosser	TSSA
2003	Jonathan Baume	FDA	Brian Caton	POA	Jeremy Dear	NUJ	Andy Gilchrist	FBU	Michael J. Leahy	Community	Judy McKnight	NAPO	Bob Crow	RMT	Paul Mackney	NATFHE	Brian Orrell	NUMAST	Paul Gates	KFAT	Richard Rosser	TSSA
2004	Jonathan Baume	FDA	Brian Caton	POA	Jeremy Dear	NUJ	Andy Gilchrist	FBU	Michael J. Leahy	Community	Judy McKnight	NAPO	Bob Crow	RMT	Paul Mackney	NATFHE	Brian Orrell	NUMAST	Gerry Doherty	TSSA	Ged Nichols	Accord
2005	Jonathan Baume	FDA	Brian Caton	POA	Jeremy Dear	NUJ	Doug Nicholls	CYWU	Michael J. Leahy	Community	Judy McKnight	NAPO	Tim Poil	NGSU	Paul Mackney	NATFHE	Brian Orrell	NUMAST	Gerry Doherty	TSSA	Ged Nichols	Accord
2006	Jonathan Baume	FDA	Brian Caton	POA	Jeremy Dear	NUJ	Matt Wrack	FBU	Michael J. Leahy	Community	Judy McKnight	NAPO	Tim Poil	NGSU	Paul Mackney	NATFHE	Brian Orrell	NUMAST	Gerry Doherty	TSSA	Ged Nichols	Accord
2007	Jonathan Baume	FDA	Brian Caton	POA	Jeremy Dear	NUJ	Matt Wrack	FBU	Michael J. Leahy	Community	Judy McKnight	NAPO	Tim Poil	NGSU	John F. Smith	MU	Brian Orrell	NUMAST	Gerry Doherty	TSSA	Ged Nichols	Accord
2008	Jonathan Baume	FDA	Brian Caton	POA	Jeremy Dear	NUJ	Matt Wrack	FBU	Michael J. Leahy	Community	Christine Payne	Equity	Tim Poil	NGSU	John F. Smith	MU	Brian Orrell	NUMAST	Gerry Doherty	TSSA	Ged Nichols	Accord
2009	Jonathan Baume	FDA	Brian Caton	POA	Jeremy Dear	NUJ	Matt Wrack	FBU	Michael J. Leahy	Community	Christine Payne	Equity	Tim Poil	NGSU	John F. Smith	MU	Mark Dickinson	Nautilus	Gerry Doherty	TSSA	Ged Nichols	Accord
2010	Jonathan Baume	FDA	Bob Crow	RMT	Jeremy Dear	NUJ	Matt Wrack	FBU	Michael J. Leahy	Community	Steve Gillan	POA	Tim Poil	NGSU	John F. Smith	MU	Mark Dickinson	Nautilus	Gerry Doherty	TSSA	Ged Nichols	Accord
2011	Jonathan Baume	FDA	Bob Crow	RMT	Michelle Stanistreet	NUJ	Matt Wrack	FBU	Michael J. Leahy	Community	Steve Gillan	POA	Tim Poil	NGSU	John F. Smith	MU	Mark Dickinson	Nautilus	Simon Weller	ASLEF	Ged Nichols	Accord

In 2012, unions with 30,000 to 99,999 members were moved to Section B, and Section C was reduced to seven members.

Year	Name	Union	Name	Union	Name	Union	Name	Union	Name	Union	Name	Union	Name	Union
2012	Manuel Cortes	TSSA	Mark Dickinson	Nautilus	Ged Nichols	Accord	Dave Penman	FDA	Tim Poil	NGSU	Eddie Saville	HCSA	Simon Weller	ASLEF
2013	Manuel Cortes	TSSA	Mark Dickinson	Nautilus	Ged Nichols	Accord	Dave Penman	FDA	Tim Poil	NGSU	Eddie Saville	HCSA	Simon Weller	ASLEF
2014	Manuel Cortes	TSSA	Mark Dickinson	Nautilus	Ged Nichols	Accord	Dave Penman	FDA	Tim Poil	NGSU	Eddie Saville	HCSA	Simon Weller	ASLEF
2015	Manuel Cortes	TSSA	Mark Dickinson	Nautilus	Ged Nichols	Accord	Dave Penman	FDA	Tim Poil	NGSU	Eddie Saville	HCSA	Simon Weller	ASLEF
2016	Manuel Cortes	TSSA	Mark Dickinson	Nautilus	Ged Nichols	Accord	Dave Penman	FDA	Nick Cusack	PFA	Eddie Saville	HCSA	Simon Weller	ASLEF
2017	Manuel Cortes	TSSA	Mark Dickinson	Nautilus	Ged Nichols	Accord	Dave Penman	FDA	Nick Cusack	PFA	Eddie Saville	HCSA	Simon Weller	ASLEF
2018	Manuel Cortes	TSSA	Mark Dickinson	Nautilus	Ged Nichols	Accord	Dave Penman	FDA	Nick Cusack	PFA	Brian Linn	Aegis	Simon Weller	ASLEF
2019	Manuel Cortes	TSSA	Mark Dickinson	Nautilus	Ged Nichols	Accord	Dave Penman	FDA	Martin Furlong	COP	Brian Linn	Aegis	Simon Weller	ASLEF
2020	Manuel Cortes	TSSA	Mark Dickinson	Nautilus	Ged Nichols	Accord	Dave Penman	FDA	Martin Furlong	COP	Brian Linn	Aegis	Simon Weller	ASLEF
2021	Manuel Cortes	TSSA	Mark Dickinson	Nautilus	Ged Nichols	Accord	Dave Penman	FDA	Martin Furlong	COP	Brian Linn	Aegis	Simon Weller	ASLEF
2022	Manuel Cortes	TSSA	Mark Dickinson	Nautilus	Ged Nichols	Accord	Dave Penman	FDA	Martin Furlong	COP	Brian Linn	Aegis	Simon Weller	ASLEF
2023	Sarah Woolley	BFAWU	Mark Dickinson	Nautilus	Ged Nichols	Accord	Dave Penman	FDA	Martin Furlong	COP	Brian Linn	Aegis	Simon Weller	ASLEF
2024	Sarah Woolley	BFAWU	Mark Dickinson	Nautilus	Ged Nichols	Accord	Dave Penman	FDA	Martin Furlong	COP	Brian Linn	Aegis	Simon Weller	ASLEF
2025	Sarah Woolley	BFAWU	Nick Cusack	PFA	Ged Nichols	Accord	Dave Penman	FDA	Martin Furlong	COP	Amy Leversidge	BALPA	Simon Weller	ASLEF

==== Section D: Women ====
Year	Representative	Union	Representative	Union	Representative	Union	Representative	Union	Representative	Union	Representative	Union
1983	Olwyn Davies	NUPE	Ada Maddocks	NALGO	Gina Morgan	AEU	Marie Patterson	TGWU	Muriel Turner	ASTMS	Pat Turner	GMB
1985	Olwyn Davies	NUPE	Ada Maddocks	NALGO	Gina Morgan	AEU	Margaret Prosser	TGWU	Muriel Turner	ASTMS	Pat Turner	GMB
1987	Bernadette Hillon	USDAW	Ada Maddocks	NALGO	Gina Morgan	AEU	Margaret Prosser	TGWU	Ina Love	NUPE	Pat Turner	GMB

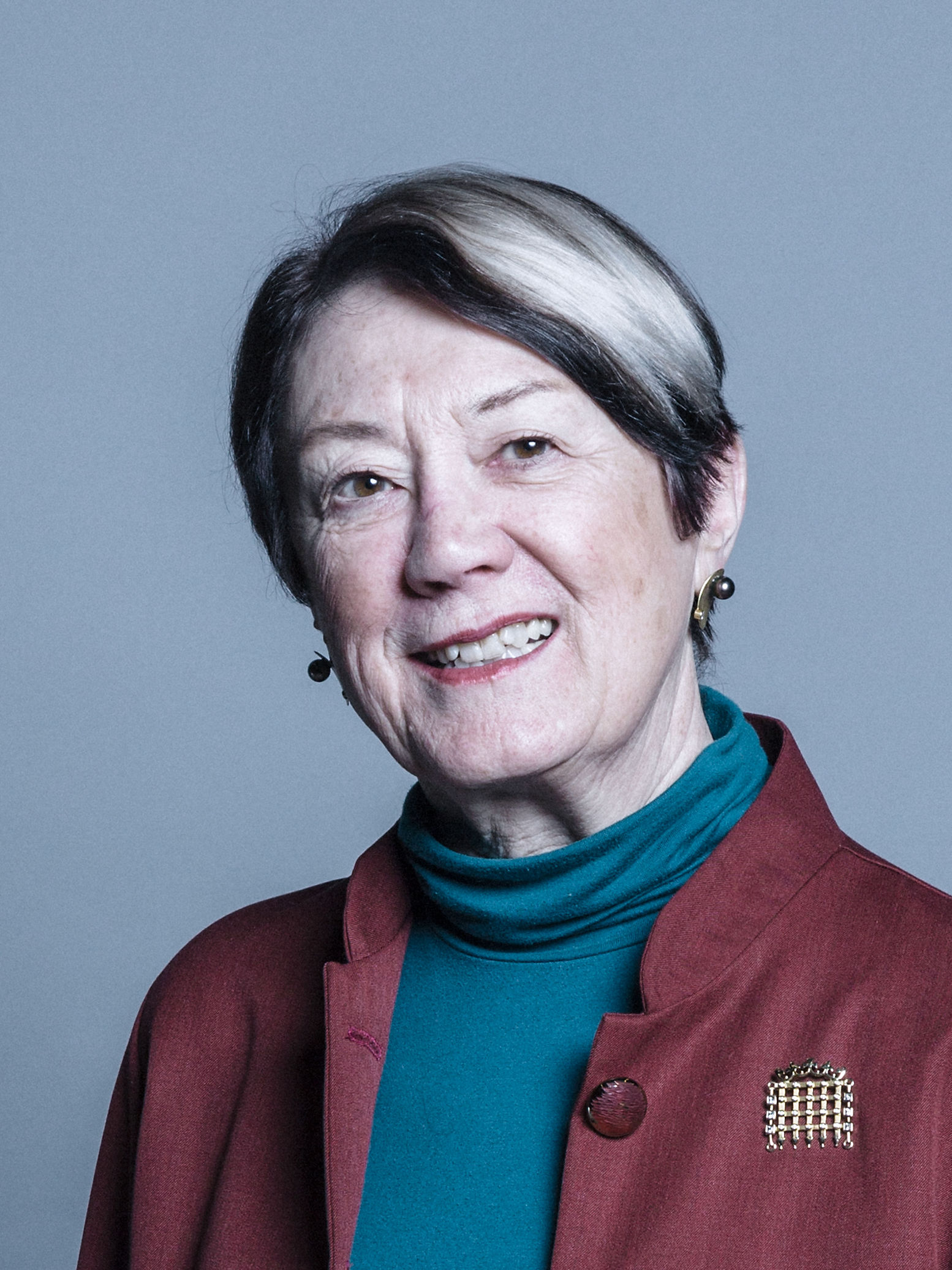
Diana Warwick, member from 1989 to 1992

Reduced to four members in 1989.

Year	Representative	Union	Representative	Union	Representative	Union	Representative	Union
1989	Liz Symons	FDA	Pam Thomas	SOGAT	Diana Warwick	AUT	Margaret Morritt	UCW
1990	Liz Symons	FDA	Pam Thomas	SOGAT	Diana Warwick	AUT	Jeannie Drake	NCU
1992	Liz Symons	FDA	Pat Hawkes	NUT	Pat Dwyer	UCW	Jeannie Drake	NCU
1995	Liz Symons	FDA	Pat Hawkes	NUT	Helen McGrath	KFAT	Jocelyn Prudence	CSP
1996	Anita Halpin	NUJ	Pat Hawkes	NUT	Helen McGrath	KFAT	Jocelyn Prudence	CSP
1997	Penny Holloway	AUT	Pat Hawkes	NUT	Helen McGrath	KFAT	Jocelyn Prudence	CSP
1999	Penny Holloway	AUT	Pat Hawkes	NUT	Anita Halpin	NUJ	Jenny Thurston	Prospect
2000	Penny Holloway	AUT	Pat Hawkes	NUT	Lesley Mercer	CSP	Jenny Thurston	Prospect
2001	Penny Holloway	AUT	Anita Halpin	NUJ	Lesley Mercer	CSP	Jenny Thurston	Prospect
2002	Julie Grant	ATL	Anita Halpin	NUJ	Lesley Mercer	CSP	Jenny Thurston	Prospect
2003	Sally Hunt	AUT	Anita Halpin	NUJ	Lesley Mercer	CSP	Jenny Thurston	Prospect
2005	Sally Hunt	AUT	Anita Halpin	NUJ	Lesley Mercer	CSP	Sue Ferns	Prospect
2007	Julia Neal	ATL	Anita Halpin	NUJ	Lesley Mercer	CSP	Sue Ferns	Prospect
2009	Julia Neal	ATL	Joanna Brown	SCP	Lesley Mercer	CSP	Sue Ferns	Prospect
2011	Alice Robinson	ATL	Joanna Brown	SCP	Lesley Mercer	CSP	Sue Ferns	Prospect
2012	Alice Robinson	ATL	Joanna Brown	SCP	Sue Mather	Community	Sue Ferns	Prospect
2013	Niamh Sweeney	ATL	Joanna Brown	SCP	Sue Mather	Community	Sue Ferns	Prospect
2014	Niamh Sweeney	ATL	Joanna Brown	SCP	Linda Rolph	Accord	Sue Ferns	Prospect
2016	Niamh Sweeney	ATL	Annette Mansell-Green	BDA	Linda Rolph	Accord	Sue Ferns	Prospect
2017	Vicky Knight	UCU	Annette Mansell-Green	BDA	Linda Rolph	Accord	Sue Ferns	Prospect
2018	Vicky Knight	UCU	Annette Mansell-Green	BDA	Janice Godrich	PCS	Sue Ferns	Prospect
2019	Isabelle Gutierrez	MU	Annette Mansell-Green	BDA	Jane Loftus	CWU	Sue Ferns	Prospect
2021	Heather McKenzie	NEU	Annette Mansell-Green	BDA	Jane Loftus	CWU	Sue Ferns	Prospect
2023	Vacant		Annette Mansell-Green	BDA	Jane Loftus	CWU	Sue Ferns	Prospect
2024	Alice Angliss	MU	Annette Mansell-Green	BDA	Kate Hudson	CWU	Sue Ferns	Prospect

==== Sections E, F and G: Black workers ====
Year	Section E		Section F		Section G	
Year	Representative	Union	Representative	Union	Representative	Union
1994	Bob Purkiss	TGWU	Gus Boateng	UCW	Gloria Mills	Unison
1995	Bob Purkiss	TGWU	Mohan Dhamrait	NUT	Gloria Mills	Unison
2000	Mohammad Taj	Unite	Mohan Dhamrait	NUT	Gloria Mills	Unison
2001	Mohammad Taj	Unite	Leslie Mannaseh	Prospect	Gloria Mills	Unison
2015	Mohammad Taj	Unite	Micky Nicholas	FBU	Gloria Mills	Unison
2017	Susan Matthews	Unite	Micky Nicholas	FBU	Gloria Mills	Unison
2018	Susan Matthews	Unite	Ian Lawrence	Napo	Gloria Mills	Unison

==== Section H: Disabled workers ====
Created 2001

Year	Representative	Union
2001	Mark Fysh	Unison
2011	Seán McGovern	Unite
2020	Dave Allen	Unite
2023	Martyn Gwyther	Unite
2026	Dean Collins	Unite

==== Section I: LGBT workers ====
Created 2001

Year	Representative	Union
2001	David Lascelles	GMB
2006	Maria Exall	CWU

==== Section J: Young workers ====
Created 2001

Year	Representative	Union
2001	Phil Pinder	TGWU
2004	Matthew McGregor	TGWU
2005	John Walsh	Unite
2011	Fern McCaffrey	GMB
2016	Craig Dawson	GMB
2018	Charlie Gray	GMB
2026	Neil Bennett	CSP
