= Dixie Howell (disambiguation) =

Dixie Howell (Millard Fleming Howell, 1912–1971) was an American football player and head coach, minor league baseball player.

Dixie Howell may also refer to:

- Dixie Howell (pitcher) (Millard Fillmore Howell, 1920–1960), Major League Baseball pitcher
- Dixie Howell (catcher) (Homer Elliott Howell, 1920–1990), Major League Baseball catcher
- Fred Howell (1907-1975), British trade unionist
