= Ken Baker (trade unionist) =

British trade unionist (1924–2022)

Frederick Albert Baker CBE (1924 – November 2002), known as Ken Baker, was a British trade unionist.

== Biography ==
Baker was born in 1924. He joined the National Union of General and Municipal Workers, and became a shop steward. Baker gradually rose to prominence in the union, eventually becoming its National Officer. He regularly represented the union at the Trades Union Congress (TUC), serving on the General Council of the TUC from 1976 to 1985, and also on the TUC's Employment Policy and Organisation Committee. He was the TUC's main delegate on the Manpower Services Commission, dealing with training.

Baker was also a member of the executive of the Confederation of Shipbuilding and Engineering Unions, and he served as its president in 1979/80. In 1977, he was made a Commander of the Order of the British Empire.

Trade union offices
Preceded by Frederick Hayday	National Industrial Officer of the National Union of General and Municipal Workers; 1967–1971	Succeeded by John Edmonds
Preceded by Hugh Scanlon	President of the Confederation of Shipbuilding and Engineering Unions; 1979–1980	Succeeded by Roy Grantham
