= Harry Berry =

British trade unionist

Harry Berry (died 28 July 1938) was a British trade unionist.

Berry worked as a fitter and turner. In 1897, he joined the Steam Engine Makers' Society, and he became increasingly prominent in the union, being elected as its assistant general secretary in 1912. The union merged into the Amalgamated Engineering Union in 1920, and Berry was elected to its executive committee.

In 1935, Berry was elected to the General Council of the Trades Union Congress, serving until his death. He also served on the Joint Industrial Councils for Engineering, Shipbuilding, and Electricity, on the National Railway Shopmen's Council, and a Home Office committee on crane safety.
