= National Laundry Workers' Union =

- Founded: 1917
- Dissolved: 1940s
- Headquarters: Union Society Chambers, Edinburgh
- Location: United Kingdom
- Members: 1,000 (1920)
- Affiliations: TUC

The National Laundry Workers' Union was a small trade union representing laundry workers in the United Kingdom, particularly around Edinburgh.

The union was in existence by the summer of 1917, and by 1920 it had about 1,000 members, the large majority of them women. J. H. Moore, its delegate to the Trades Union Congress (TUC), was elected to the General Council of the TUC in 1923, but union membership had by this time dropped to only 327 and never recovered. The union remained affiliated to the TUC until 1940, and appears to have dissolved before 1947.

== General Secretaries ==
1917: G. Donaldson
1925: M. R. Whinman
1932: M. Loughlin
1936: J. H. Moore
1937: M. Stewart
1938: C. C. Dingwall
