= Herbert Eastwood =

Herbert Eastwood (1881 – 9 January 1954) was a trade unionist and politician.

Born in Leeds, Eastwood was an early supporter of the Clarion movement, before becoming an organiser for the Independent Labour Party. He joined the Labour Party, and from 1922 worked full-time for it as a constituency secretary and election agent in Bolton. He was elected to Bolton Borough Council, serving on it for 20 years, then from 1946 served on Manchester City Council.

In 1936, Eastwood was elected as general secretary of the United Rubber Workers of Great Britain, and in 1948 he was additionally elected to the General Council of the Trades Union Congress, although he was removed from that office in 1949 for canvassing for re-election. He died in 1954, still holding his other offices.

Trade union offices
Preceded by H. H. Duke	General Secretary of the United Rubber Workers of Great Britain; 1936–1954	Succeeded by Laurence Walsh
