= Dougie Rooney =

Scottish trade unionist (1947–2025)

Dougie Rooney (12 October 1947 – 9 April 2025) was a former Scottish trade unionist.

Born in Edinburgh, Rooney attended Tynecastle Secondary School, then undertook an apprenticeship as a fitter with Ferranti. He completed this in 1970 and immediately became a shop steward with the Amalgamated Engineering Union (AEU), progressing to become a Senior Shop Steward in 1974, then a full-time Divisional Organiser for the union in 1985, with responsibility for the East of Scotland.

The AEU became part of the Amalgamated Engineering and Electrical Union, and Rooney was elected as its National Officer with responsibility for energy and utilities in 1997, remaining in this post as it became part of Amicus and then Unite. In 1998, he was elected to the General Council of the Trades Union Congress (TUC), and served as President of the TUC in 2009/10.

Rooney was also active in the Labour Party, chairing the Scottish Labour Party's Standing Orders Committee until 2008. He retired from his union posts in 2011, becoming an energy consultant.

Trade union offices
Preceded by Sheila Bearcroft	President of the Trades Union Congress; 2009–2010	Succeeded by Michael Leahy
