= Roy Rickhuss =

British trade union leader (born 1960)

Royston Rickhuss CBE (born August 1960) is a British trade union leader.

Born in Wednesfield, Wolverhampton, Rickhuss attended Coppice High School. In 1979, Rickhuss began working in the Monmore Tubes rolling mill, and joined the Iron and Steel Trades Confederation (ISTC).

Rickhuss soon became the health and safety officer for his union branch. In 1993, he began working full-time for the union, serving as a regional officer for South Wales and the South West of England and later, for the Midlands and North West. In 2004, he was appointed as the union's Assistant General Secretary, but later that year it merged into Community, and he became the new union's National Officer.

In 2013, Rickhuss was elected as the general secretary of Community. He also serves on the General Council of the Trades Union Congress, and the executives of the General Federation of Trade Unions and the Confederation of Shipbuilding and Engineering Unions.

He was appointed a Commander of the Order of the British Empire (CBE) in the 2019 New Year Honours, for services to the steel industry.

Trade union offices
Preceded by Eddie Lynch	Assistant General Secretary of the Iron and Steel Trades Confederation; 2004	Succeeded by Position abolished
Preceded by Michael J. Leahy	General Secretary of Community; 2013 – present	Succeeded by Incumbent
Preceded by Oshor Williams	President of the General Federation of Trade Unions; 2021–2023	Succeeded by Sarah Woolley
