= Ina Love =

Scottish trade unionist

Ina Love, born Wilhelmina McKechnie (1928 – 5 October 2004), was a Scottish trade unionist.

Born in Blackhill, Glasgow, McKechnie worked selling meat at a market from the age of fourteen, then two years later became a telephonist at the Post Office, joining the Union of Post Office Workers. She spent four years in the Women's Royal Army Corps, and also worked as a telephonist at the Springburn Police Station, where she met and married Jimmy Love. She had three children and the family emigrated to Canada in 1960, but the move did not go well, and Ina and the children returned to Scotland three years later.

On returning, Love became a telephonist at Stobhill Hospital in Glasgow, soon being promoted to head telephonist. She joined the National Union of Public Employees (NUPE) and gradually came to prominence in the union, becoming a steward in 1968, then the founding chair of NUPE's Scottish Divisional Council in 1976. Three years later, she was elected to the union's National Executive Council, and she was the chair of the union in 1988/89. She also chaired the union's Standing Orders Committee.

Love represented NUPE on the General Council of the Trades Union Congress. She also served on the executive of the Scottish Labour Party, on which she successfully argued for the introduction of a minimum wage, and on the Labour Middle East Council, where she worked to raise awareness of Palestinian people.
