= Maureen Rooney =

British politician and trade unionist (1947–2003)

Maureen Gowran Rooney CBE (27 April 1947 – 2 May 2003) was a Scottish trade unionist.

Born in Blantyre in Lanarkshire as Maureen Cunningham, she was educated at Elmwood Convent School and worked as a hairdresser before marrying and bringing up four children. In 1974, she returned to work, finding a post as a machine operator at the Hoover factory in Cambuslang.

Rooney became involved in the Amalgamated Engineering Union (AEU), serving on its mid-Lanark district committee alongside Bill Tynan and Tom McCabe. She also gave speeches at the union's national conference and in 1989 was elected to the National Executive Committee of the Labour Party. She supported more redistributive policies than previous AEU representatives, including a national minimum wage and all-women shortlists.

In 1990, the AEU decided to create a full-time National Women's Officer post, and Rooney was elected. That year, she also won election to the General Council of the Trades Union Congress (TUC) and its Women's Committee. When the AEU merged into the Amalgamated Engineering and Electrical Union (AEEU), she remained Women's Officer and, in 1993, she became co-chair of the Women's National Commission.

Rooney was elected to the executive committee of the TUC in 1999, and chaired the AEEU conferences in 1999 and 2000. In 2001, she was promoted to become National Officer of the union. She also served on the Health and Safety Commission and as vice-president of the National Childminders' Association. The AEEU became part of Amicus in 2002, and Rooney again maintained her posts, but was diagnosed with cancer, and died in 2003.

Rooney was made an Officer of the Order of the British Empire in 1996, and a Commander of the Order of the British Empire shortly before her death.
