= Frederick Hayday =

British trade unionist (1912–1990)

Sir Frederick Hayday, CBE (26 June 1912 – 26 February 1990) was a British trade unionist who served on many public bodies.

The son of Arthur Hayday, trade unionist and Labour Member of Parliament, Frederick Hayday was born in Nottingham. He joined the Labour Party at 16 years old.

He was elected District Organiser of his father's union, the National Union of General and Municipal Workers, dealing with gas, iron ore, gypsum mining, road haulage, brick making, and public services and as a member of Regional and National Joint Industrial Councils for many industries, serving in some instances as secretary to the JIC.

During World War II, Hayday was appointed by the Lord Chancellor to the North Midlands Aliens Tribunal and served as a member of Labour Supply Committee for the Chemical Industry, and on many wartime panels dealing with labour problems, military hardships’ committee, etc.

Soon after the war he was appointed by the Minister of Works to serve as member of the Brick Amenities Committee to investigate conditions in the brick industry and made visits to many brickworks in the UK and in Belgium and the Netherlands.

In December 1946, Hayday was appointed Industrial Officer of National Union of General and Municipal Workers and in 1950 he was elected to the Trades Union Congress General Council. In October 1960 he was appointed as a member of the Constitutional Commission for Malta in place of Sir Alfred Roberts who had been taken ill. He was also a member of Nuclear Safety Advisory Committee and of the Radioactive Substances Advisory Committee. He led a team of European trade unionists to the United States to study radiation problems.

In September 1962, Hayday became Chairman of the TUC General Council. In December 1962 he was appointed as a part-time member of the British Railways Board. In January 1965 he became a member of Energy Advisory Council and in May 1965 a member of the Gas Advisory Council. In 1966 he visited South Africa on a fact-finding mission for the TUC and in 1967 and 1968 he visited the Middle East (both Israel and Arab countries) to investigate the trade union situation following the Six-Day War.

== Awards ==
In June 1963, Hayday was awarded the CBE for work as the National Industrial Officer of the National Union of General and Municipal Workers and as Chairman General Council of the Trades Union Congress. In January 1969 he was knighted in the New Year Honours.

Trade union offices
Preceded by ?	National Industrial Officer of the National Union of General and Municipal Workers; 1946–1967	Succeeded by Ken Baker
Preceded by Anne Godwin	President of the Trades Union Congress; 1963	Succeeded by George H. Lowthian
Preceded by Wilfred Beard and Joseph O'Hagan	Trades Union Congress representative to the AFL-CIO; 1959; With: Frank Cousins	Succeeded by Claude Bartlett and Bill Webber
Preceded by Alfred Roberts	President of the ICFTU European Regional Organisation; 1963–1969	Organisation dissolved
