= Fred Howell =

British trade unionist (1907–1975)

Frederick J. Howell, often known as Dixie Howell (1907 – 11 November 1975), was a British trade unionist.

Howell worked at Smithfield Market in London. He joined the Transport and General Workers' Union (TGWU), and soon became a shop steward. He gradually came to prominence, becoming the chair of the union's General Workers Group, and the London representative on the union's National Executive Committee, and served for a period as the vice chair of the union.

In 1970, Howell was elected to the General Council of the Trades Union Congress; he served until his retirement, in September 1974. He died the following year.
