= United Rubber Workers of Great Britain =

Former trade union of the United Kingdom

The United Rubber Workers of Great Britain was an organisation representing workers involved in the processing of rubber and other waterproof materials in the United Kingdom.

The union was founded in 1889 as the Waterproof Trade Union, then in 1891 changed its name to the India Rubber, Cable and Asbestos Workers' Union. Before World War I it was renamed the United Rubber Workers of Great Britain. Its membership fell to only 312 in 1936, at the end of a long trade depression, but it survived and by 1945, membership had risen to more than 4,000 people. It then changed its name to the Rubber, Plastic and Allied Workers' Union.

In 1974, the union merged into the National Union of General and Municipal Workers.

== Secretaries ==
1910s: H. H. Duke
1936: Herbert Eastwood
1954: Laurence Walsh
