= Michael Leahy (trade unionist) =

Michael James Leahy OBE (born 7 January 1949) was the General Secretary of the British Trade Union Community. Leahy was General Secretary of the Iron and Steel Trades Confederation (ISTC) from 1999 until it merged with the National Union of Knitwear, Footwear & Apparel Trades (KFAT) in 2004 to form Community. He served as General Secretary until 2013.

== Early life ==
Leahy was born in Pontypool, Wales, in 1949. He attended Twmpath Secondary Modern School. Michael joined the ISTC in 1965 upon starting work as a Chargehand at Panteg Steel Works, where he was employed from 1965 to 1977.

He is married with two children.

== Union career ==
Leahy was employed as an organiser from 1977 to 1986, then as a senior organiser from 1986 to 1992. He was elected Assistant General Secretary of ISTC in 1993 and General Secretary in 1999.

Leahy was President of the iron, steel and nonferrous metals sector of the International Metalworkers' Federation (IMF) and sat on the executive of European Metalworkers' Federation (EMF-FEM). He was a member of the Trades Union Congress (TUC) executive committee, and was the President of the TUC for 2011.

== Middle East Peace Process ==
Leahy is a co-founder of the Trade Unions Linking Israel and Palestine.

Trade union offices
Preceded by Keith Brookman	Assistant General Secretary of the Iron and Steel Trades Confederation; 1993–1999	Succeeded by Eddie Lynch
Preceded by Keith Brookman	General Secretary of the Iron and Steel Trades Confederation; 1999–2004	Succeeded by Position abolished
Preceded by New position	General Secretary of Community; 2004–2013	Succeeded by Roy Rickhuss
Preceded by Dougie Rooney	President of the Trades Union Congress; 2010–2011	Succeeded by Paul Kenny
