= Boilermaker =

Tradesperson who fabricates steel, iron, or copper into boilers

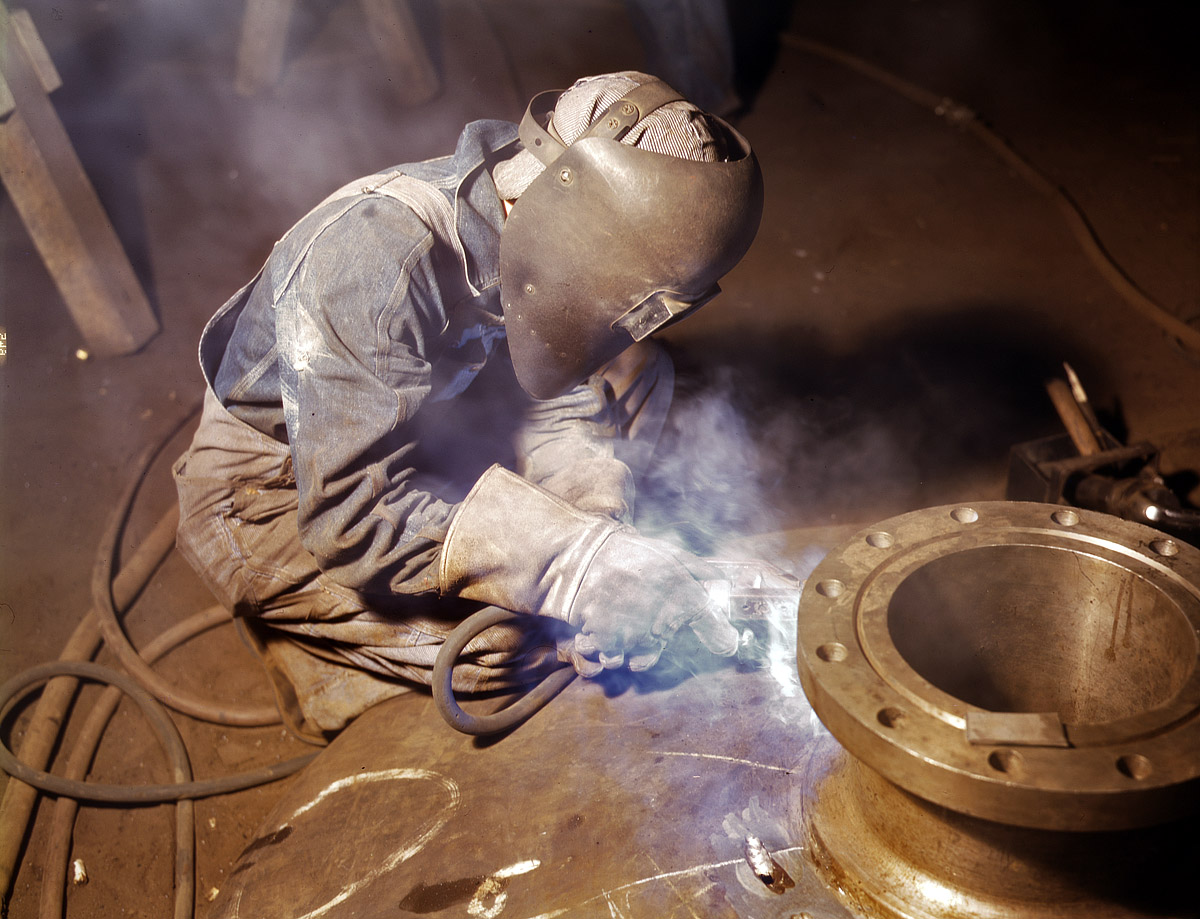
- A boilermaker welds nozzle on pressure vessel, June 1942

Occupation
- Occupation type: Vocational
- Activity sectors: Construction; Industrial manufacturing Shipbuilding

Description
- Education required: Apprenticeship
- Related jobs: Welder

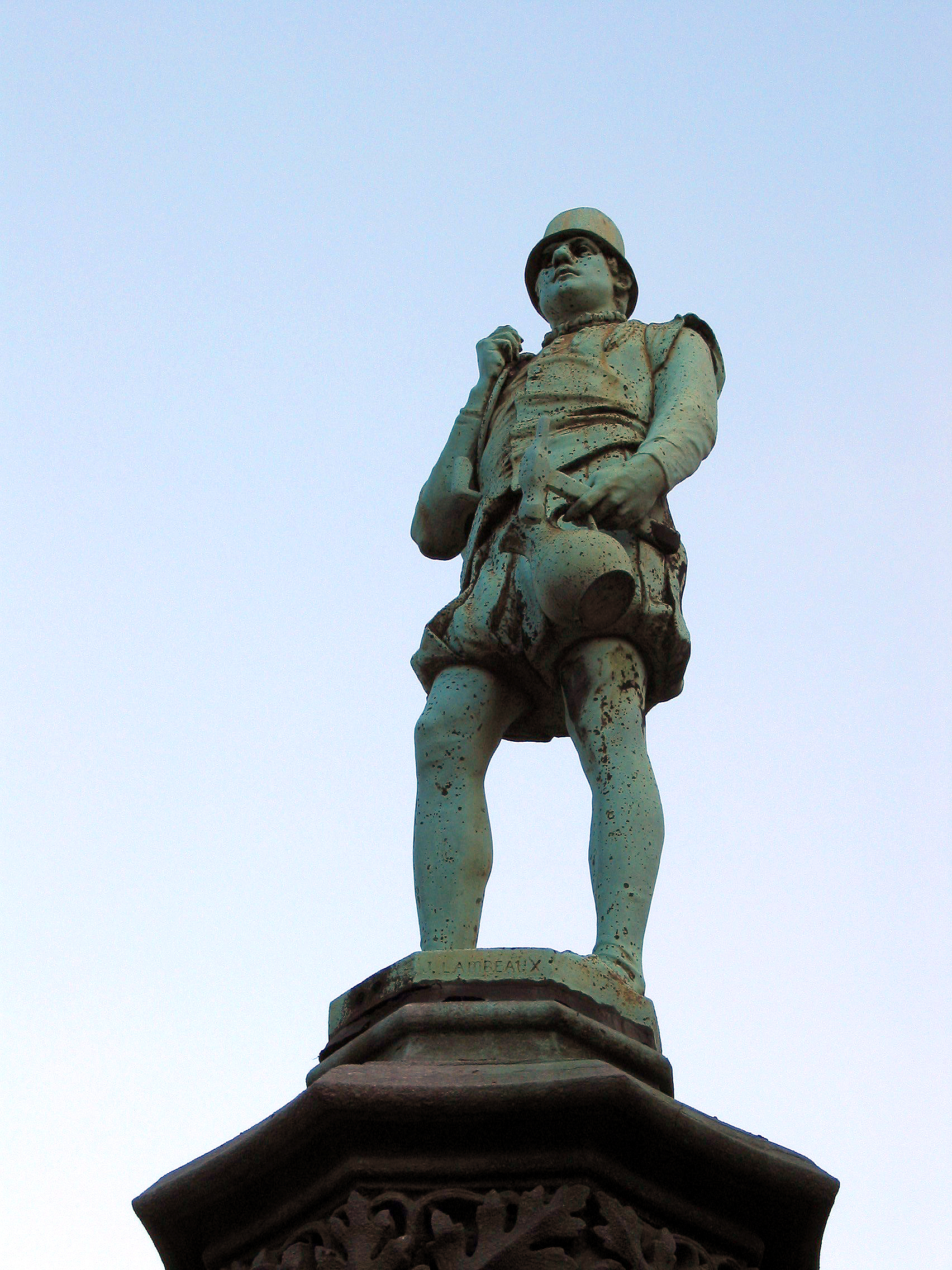
Statue of a boilermaker by the sculptor Jef Lambeaux.

A boilermaker is a tradesperson who fabricates steels, iron, or copper into boilers and other large containers intended to hold hot gas or liquid, as well as maintains and repairs boilers and boiler systems.

Although the name originated from craftsmen who made boilers, boilermakers assemble, maintain, and repair other large vessels and closed vats, in addition to boilers.

The boilermaker trade evolved from industrial blacksmithing; in the early nineteenth century, a boilermaker was called a boilersmith. The involvement of boilermakers in the shipbuilding and engineering industries came about because of the changeover from wood to iron as a construction material. It was often easier, and less expensive, to hire a boilermaker who was already in the shipyard—fabricating iron boilers for wooden steamships—to build a ship. This overlap of skills could extend to anything large and made of iron—or later, steel. In the UK, this effective monopoly over an important skill of the industrial revolution led to boilermakers being labeled "the labour aristocracy" by historians.

== Application ==
Boilermaking, welding, and fitting tubes can be a full-time requirement at power plants. Stress fractures, leaks, and corrosion demand continual repair or replacement resulting from operation at very high steam pressures. Other boilermakers might work seasonally or on an individual project such as re-fitting a boiler in a seagoing vessel or remodeling a steam plant.

=== Domestic boilers in the United States of America ===
In the United States, many boilermakers are employed in repairing, repiping, and re-tubing commercial steam and hot water boilers used for heating and domestic hot water in commercial buildings and multi-family dwellings. Sometimes these boilers are referred to as pressure vessels. Generally, a pressure vessel is a storage tank or vessel that has been designed to operate at pressures above 15 psi (1.03 bar; 103 kPa).

The two main responsibilities of boilermakers are the use of oxy-acetylene gas torch sets to cut or gouge steel plate and tubes, followed by gas tungsten arc welding (GTAW), shielded metal arc welding (SMAW), or gas metal arc welding (GMAW) to attach and mend the cut sections of tubes and steel plates.

== Training and certification in the United States ==
Boilermakers usually go through a formal apprenticeship which includes about four years of paid on-the-job training combined with classroom instruction. Unions and many employers offer these apprenticeships. To become an apprentice, one must be at least 18 years old and have a high school diploma or GED. Attending a trade or technical school combined with employer-provided training can accelerate the learning curve.

According to U. S. Census Bureau data of 2012, boilermakers are the most male "saturated" job in the USA, having a share of 99.8 % males and 0.2 % females.

=== R Stamp Welding ===
Boiler repair in the United States is governed by the National Board of Boiler and Pressure Vessel Inspectors and the American Society of Mechanical Engineers (ASME) under a classification called R Stamp Welding. In order to perform R Stamp welds and repairs, boilermakers are tested and certified in the quality of their weld joints through a rigorous testing procedure. R stamps are issued to companies that have existing ASME code stamps issued for construction and whose quality control system covers repairs or follow the guidelines set up by ASME to obtain an R stamp. Welders identify their welds by stamping their identifying welder number adjacent to their completed weld with a set of steel stencils.

=== Power Piping ===
Welding, fitting, and installing the tubes and accessories that attach to the boiler can also be performed by boilermakers, and is governed by the same organizations as R Stamp Welding. This certification is called Power Piping and is governed by ASME Code section B31.1.

== Trade unions ==
=== United States and Canada ===
The International Brotherhood of Boilermakers, Iron Ship Builders, Blacksmiths, Forgers and Helpers is a labor union for boilermakers in Canada and the United States.

=== UK ===
In the UK, boilermakers traditionally joined the Boilermakers Society which merged with the General and Municipal Workers' Union (GMWU), then an unskilled union, to form the modern GMB which still maintains a "craft section" largely for boilermakers.

== Notable boilermakers and former boilermakers ==
- Omar Bradley – first Chairman of the Joint Chiefs of Staff
- Richard Carroll – American politician
- Billy Connolly – Scottish comedian
- Dave Charnley – boxer
- Fred Cornish – rugby player
- Horace Elgin Dodge – Dodge Motors founder
- John Francis Dodge – Dodge Motors founder
- Arthur Dooley – artist
- John A. Duffy – American Roman Catholic bishop
- Todd Graves – fast-food entrepreneur
- John Hill – trade unionist
- Ted Hill – British politician
- James J. Jeffries (The Boilermaker) – American champion heavyweight boxer
- John MacDougall – British politician
- Duncan McNeil – British politician
- David Morehouse – chief executive officer, Pittsburgh Penguins National Hockey League team
- Harry Pollitt – British communist politician
- George Sage - British footballer
- Alfred Short – British politician
- Barry Williams – British trade-union official
- Billy Williams – British rugby player
- David Williams – British politician
- Thomas Wilson – American industrialist
