= President of the Trades Union Congress =

Leader of the British trade union

The president of the Trades Union Congress is a prominent but largely honorary position in British trade unionism.

== History ==
Initially, the post of president was elected at the annual Trades Union Congress (TUC) itself, and would serve just for the duration of the congress. Early standing orders stated that preference had to be given to a candidate from the city where the congress was being held; they were not necessarily well-known figures.

In 1900, the standing orders were changed to state that the presidency would be filled by the person who had chaired the Parliamentary Committee over the previous year. As a result, before 1900, numerous people served as chair of the Parliamentary Committee without becoming president; after this date, presidents were prominent figures in the national trade union movement. The Parliamentary Committee was replaced by the General Council in 1921, and the system continued.

There were still rare occasions where the chair did not become president. Margaret Bondfield, who was elected as chair in 1923, resigned to accept a government post before becoming president. George Isaacs, who was elected as chair in 1944, similarly resigned to accept a government post, and was replaced by the vice-president, Ebby Edwards, who had presided over the previous year's congress.

In recent years, the president has once more been elected at the annual congress, but now officially fills the office for the remainder of the year and then presides over the following year's conference (in the years listed below).

== Presidents to 1899 ==
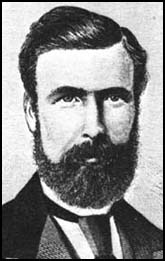
George Potter, President in 1871

Edwin Coulson, President in 1881

Year	Name	Union
1868	William Henry Wood	Manchester and Salford Trades Council
1869	Thomas Wilkinson	Flint Glass Makers Friendly Society
1871	George Potter	London Working Men's Association
1872	W. H. Leatherland	Organised Trades Association
1873	William Lishman	Leeds Trades Council
1874	William Rolley	Sheffield Federated Trades Council
1875	James Fitzpatrick	Liverpool Trades Council
1875	John Battersby	Scottish Typographical Association
1876	James C. Laird	Newcastle Trades Council
1877	Daniel Merrick	Leicester Trades Council
1878	George Fowler Jones	Bristol Trades Council
1879	David Gibson	Edinburgh and District Trades Council
1880	John Murphy	Friendly Society of Ironfounders
1881	Edwin Coulson	Operative Bricklayers' Society
1882	Robert Austin	Amalgamated Society of Engineers
1883	Thomas Smith	Amalgamated Society of Lithographic Printers
1884	James Thompson	Aberdeen Trades Council
1885	T. R. Threlfall	Typographical Association
1886	Frederick Maddison	Typographical Association
1887	W. Bevan	Amalgamated Society of Carpenters and Joiners
1888	Samuel Shaftoe	Yorkshire United Skip, Basket and Hamper Makers Society
1889	Robert Ritchie	Dundee Trades Council
1890	William Matkin	General Union of Carpenters and Joiners
1891	Thomas Burt	Northumberland Miners' Association
1892	John Hodge	British Steel Smelters Association
1893	Samuel Munro	Typographical Association
1894	Frank Delves	Amalgamated Society of Engineers
1895	John Jenkins	Associated Shipwrights' Society
1896	John Mallinson	Edinburgh Trades Council
1897	John Valentine Stevens	National Amalgamated Association of Tin Plate Workers of Great Britain
1898	James O'Grady	Amalgamated Union of Cabinet Makers
1899	W. J. Vernon	Typographical Association

== Presidents from 1900 ==
Will Thorne, President in 1912

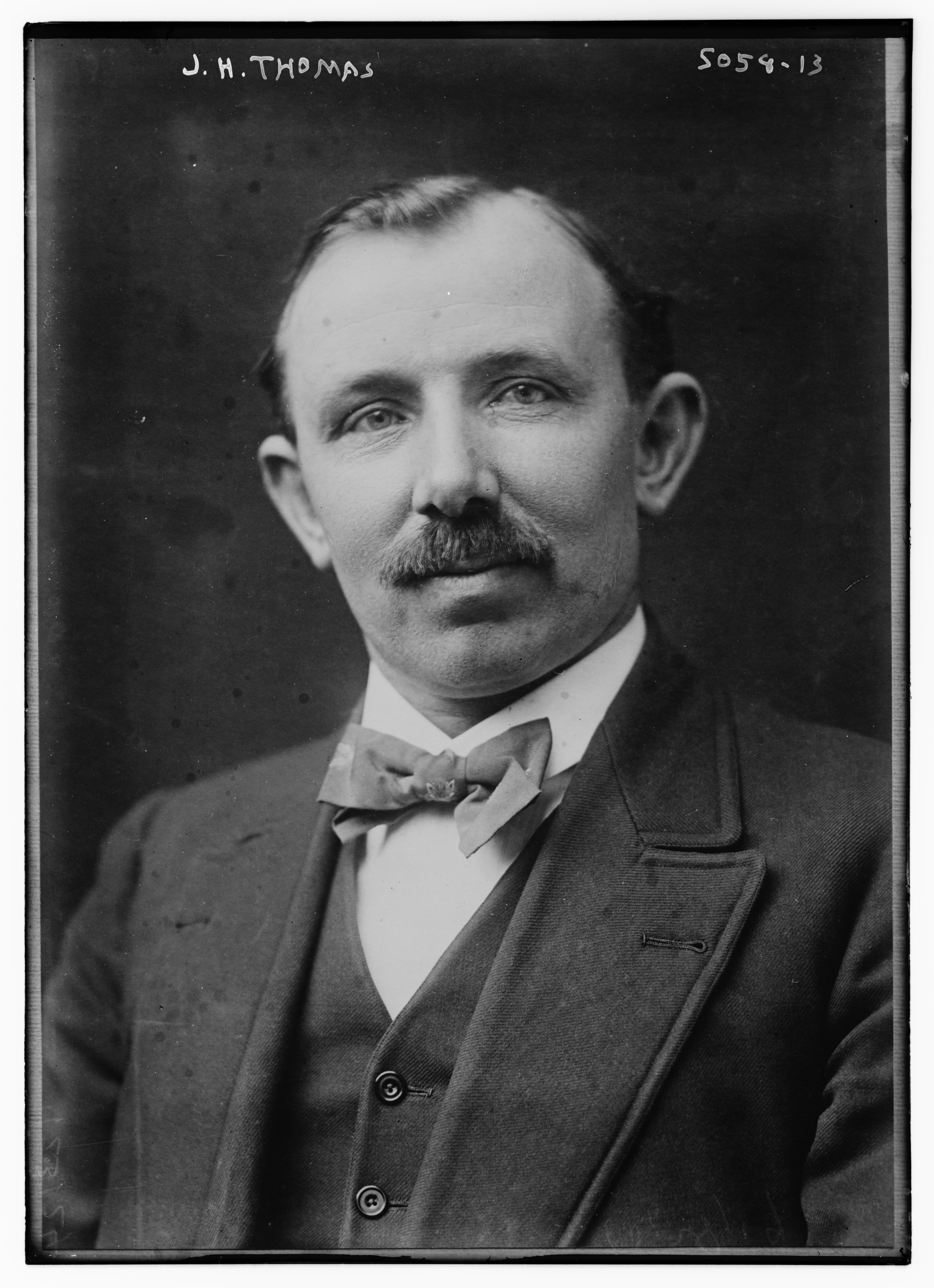
Jimmy Thomas, President in 1920

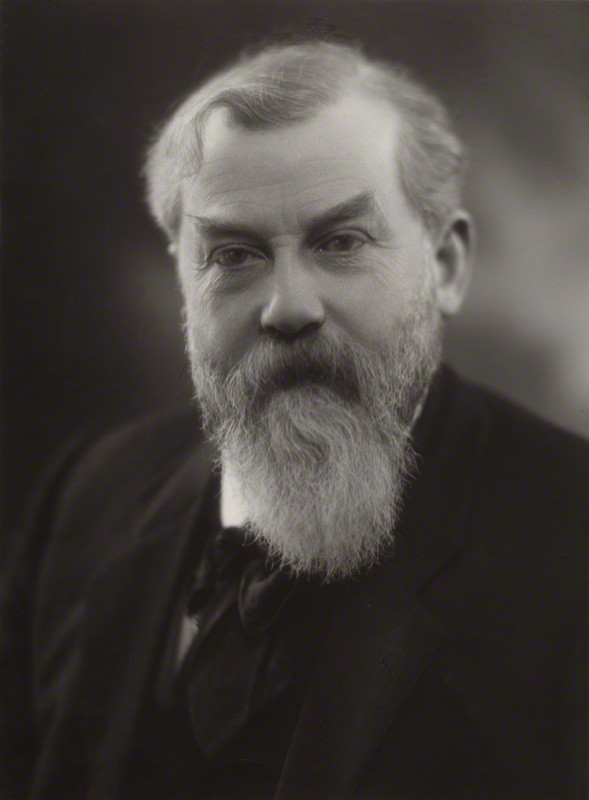
Ben Turner, President in 1928

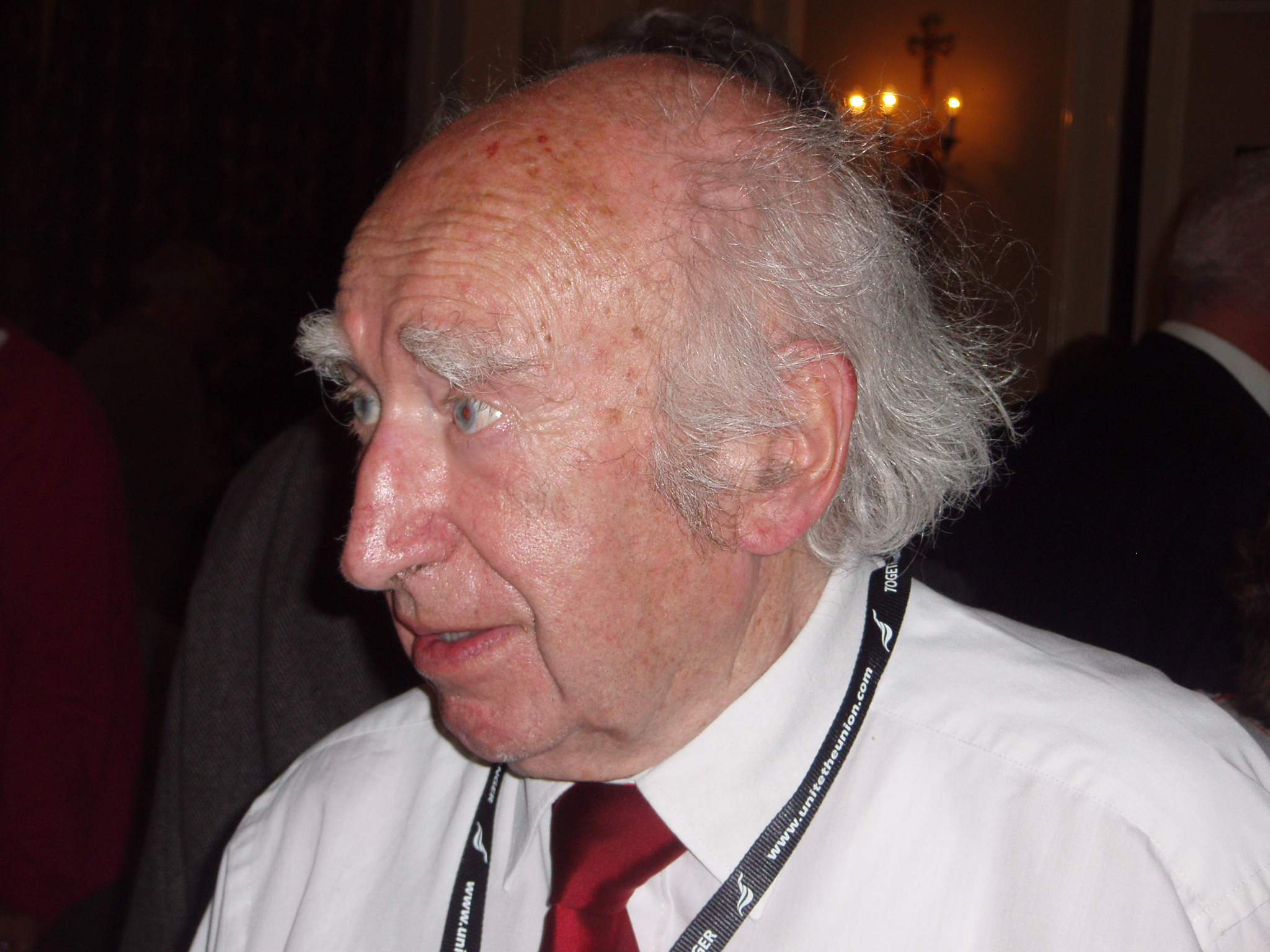
Fred Jarvis, President in 1987

Rodney Bickerstaffe, President in 1992

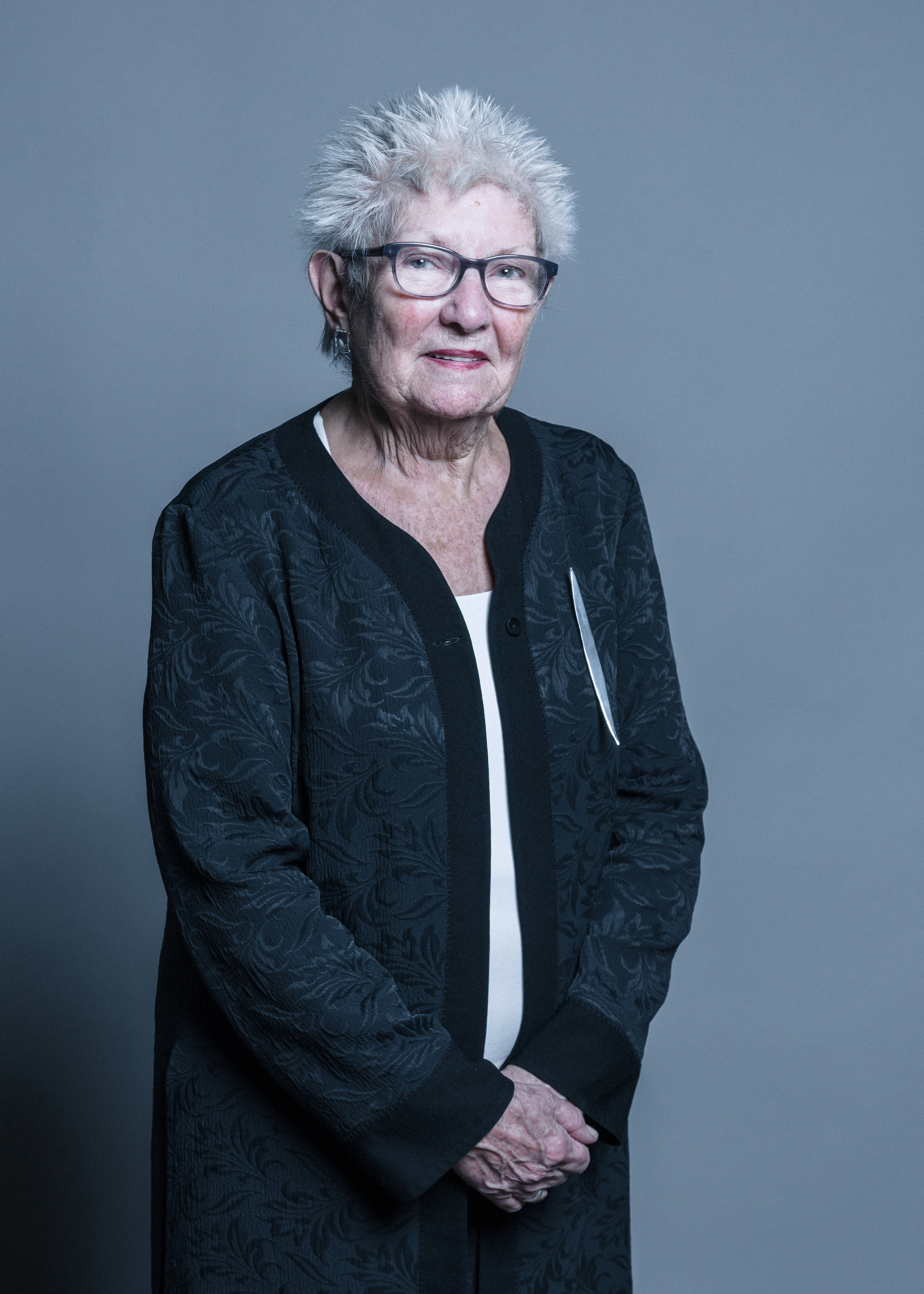
Margaret Prosser, President in 1996

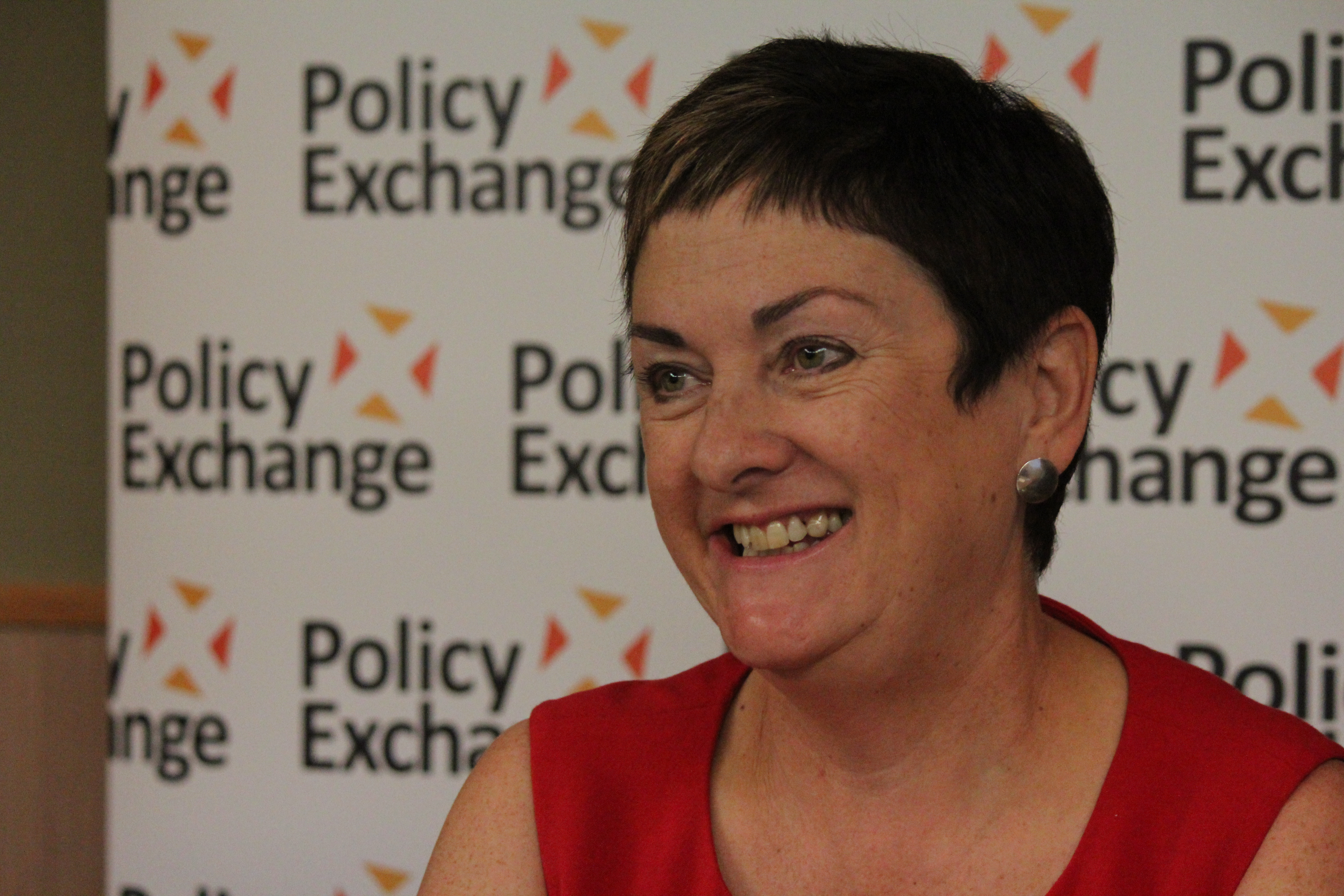
Mary Bousted, President in 2013

Year	Name	Union
1900	William Pickles	National Amalgamated Society of House and Ship Painters
1901	C. W. Bowerman	London Society of Compositors
1902	W. C. Steadman	River Thames Barge Builders Trades Union
1903	W. Boyd Hornidge	National Union of Boot and Shoe Operatives
1904	Richard Bell	Amalgamated Society of Railway Servants
1905	James Sexton	National Union of Dock Labourers
1906	D. C. Cummings	United Society of Boilermakers
1907	Alfred Gill	Bolton Cotton Spinners Association
1908	David Shackleton	Northern Counties Amalgamated Association of Weavers
1909	David Shackleton	Northern Counties Amalgamated Association of Weavers
1910	James Haslam	Miners Federation of Great Britain
1911	William Mullin	Amalgamated Association of Card and Blowing Room Operatives
1912	Will Thorne	National Union of Gas Workers and General Labourers
1913	William John Davis	Amalgamated Society of Brassworkers
1915	James Seddon	National Amalgamated Union of Shop Assistants, Warehousemen and Clerks
1916	Harry Gosling	National Transport Workers Federation
1917	John Hill	United Society of Boilermakers
1918	John William Ogden	Northern Counties Amalgamated Association of Weavers
1919	G. H. Stuart-Bunning	Postmen's Federation
1920	J. H. Thomas	National Union of Railwaymen
1921	Edward L. Poulton	National Union of Boot and Shoe Operatives
1922	Robert Barrie Walker	National Union of Agricultural Workers
1923	Joe Williams	Musicians Union
1924	Alf Purcell	National Amalgamated Furnishing Trades Association
1925	Alonzo Swales	Amalgamated Engineering Union
1926	Arthur Pugh	Iron and Steel Trades Confederation
1927	George Hicks	Amalgamated Union of Building Trade Workers
1928	Ben Turner	National Union of Textile Workers
1929	Ben Tillett	Transport and General Workers Union
1930	John Beard	Transport and General Workers Union
1931	Arthur Hayday	National Union of General and Municipal Workers
1932	John Bromley	Associated Society of Locomotive Engineers and Firemen
1933	Alexander Walkden	Railway Clerks' Association
1934	Andrew Conley	National Union of Tailors and Garment Workers
1935	William Kean	National Union of Gold, Silver and Allied Trades
1936	Alan Findlay	United Patternmakers Association
1937	Ernest Bevin	Transport and General Workers Union
1938	Herbert Henry Elvin	National Union of Clerks and Administrative Workers
1939	Joseph Hallsworth	National Union of Distributive and Allied Workers
1940	Bill Holmes	National Union of Agricultural Workers
1941	George Gibson	Mental Hospital and Institutional Workers Union
1942	Frank Wolstencroft	Amalgamated Society of Woodworkers
1943	Anne Loughlin	National Union of Tailors and Garment Workers
1944	Ebby Edwards	Miners Federation of Great Britain
1945	Ebby Edwards	National Union of Mineworkers
1946	Charles Dukes	National Union of General and Municipal Workers
1947	George Walker Thomson	Association of Engineering and Shipbuilding Draughtsmen
1948	Florence Hancock	Transport and General Workers Union
1949	Will Lawther	National Union of Mineworkers
1950	Herbert Bullock	National Union of General and Municipal Workers
1951	Alfred Roberts	National Association of Card, Blowing and Ring Room Operatives
1952	Arthur Deakin	Transport and General Workers Union
1953	Tom O'Brien	National Association of Theatrical and Kine Employees
1954	Jack Tanner	Amalgamated Engineering Union
1955	Charles Geddes	Union of Post Office Workers
1956	Wilfred Beard	United Patternmakers Association
1957	Tom Williamson	National Union of General and Municipal Workers
1958	Tom Yates	National Union of Seamen
1959	Robert Willis	London Typographical Society
1960	Claude Bartlett	Confederation Of Health Service Employees
1961	Ted Hill	United Society of Boilermakers
1962	Anne Godwin	Clerical and Administrative Workers Union
1963	Frederick Hayday	National Union of General and Municipal Workers
1964	George H. Lowthian	Amalgamated Union of Building Trade Workers
1965	Harold Collison	National Union of Agricultural Workers
1966	Joseph O'Hagan	National Union of Blastfurnacemen, Ore Miners, Coke Workers and Kindred Trades
1967	Harry Douglass	Iron and Steel Trades Confederation
1968	Lewis Wright	Amalgamated Weavers' Association
1969	John E. Newton	National Union of Tailors and Garment Workers
1970	Sidney Greene	National Union of Railwaymen
1971	Jack Cooper	National Union of General and Municipal Workers
1972	George Smith	Union of Construction, Allied Trades and Technicians
1973	Joseph Crawford	National Association of Colliery Overmen, Deputies and Shotfirers
1974	Alfred Allen	Union of Shop, Distributive and Allied Workers
1975	Marie Patterson	Transport and General Workers Union
1976	Cyril Plant	Inland Revenue Staff Federation
1977	Danny McGarvey	Amalgamated Society of Boilermakers, Shipwrights, Blacksmiths and Structural Workers
1977	Marie Patterson	Transport and General Workers Union
1978	David Basnett	National Union of General and Municipal Workers
1979	Thomas Jackson	Union of Post Office Workers
1980	Terry Parry	Fire Brigades Union
1981	Alan Fisher	National Union of Public Employees
1982	Alan Sapper	Association of Cinematograph Television and Allied Technicians
1983	Frank Chapple	Electrical, Electronic, Telecommunications and Plumbing Union
1984	Ray Buckton	Associated Society of Locomotive Engineers and Firemen
1985	Jack Eccles	General, Municipal, Boilermakers and Allied Trade Union
1986	Ken Gill	Technical, Administrative and Supervisory Section
1987	Fred Jarvis	National Union of Teachers
1988	Clive Jenkins	Manufacturing, Science and Finance
1989	Tony Christopher	Inland Revenue Staff Federation
1990	Ada Maddocks	National and Local Government Officers Association
1991	Alec Smith	GMB Union
1992	Rodney Bickerstaffe	National Union of Public Employees
1993	Alan Tuffin	Union of Communication Workers
1994	Jimmy Knapp	National Union of Rail, Maritime and Transport Workers
1995	Leif Mills	Banking, Insurance and Finance Union
1996	Margaret Prosser	Transport and General Workers Union
1997	Tony Dubbins	Graphical, Paper and Media Union
1998	John Edmonds	GMB Union
1999	Hector Mackenzie	Unison
2000	Rita Donaghy	Unison
2001	Bill Morris	Transport and General Workers Union
2002	Tony Young	Communication Workers Union
2003	Nigel de Gruchy	National Association of Schoolmasters Union of Women Teachers
2004	Roger Lyons	Amicus
2005	Jeannie Drake	Communication Workers Union
2006	Gloria Mills	Unison
2007	Alison Shepherd	Unison
2008	Dave Prentis	Unison
2009	Sheila Bearcroft	GMB Union
2010	Dougie Rooney	Unite
2011	Michael Leahy	Community
2012	Paul Kenny	GMB Union
2013	Lesley Mercer	Chartered Society of Physiotherapy
2014	Mohammad Taj	Unite
2015	Leslie Manasseh	Prospect
2016	Liz Snape	Unison
2017	Mary Bousted	Association of Teachers and Lecturers
2018	Sally Hunt	University and College Union
2019	Mark Serwotka	Public and Commercial Services Union
2020	Ged Nichols	Accord
2021	Gail Cartmail	Unite
2022	Sue Ferns	Prospect
2023	Maria Exall	Communication Workers' Union
2024	Matt Wrack	Fire Brigades Union
2025	Mark Dickinson	Nautilus International
2026	Steve Gillan	POA
2027	Simon Weller	Associated Society of Locomotive Engineers and Firemen

== See also ==
- General Secretary of the TUC
