= Arthur Williams (trade unionist) =

British trade unionist

Arthur Williams (born 1899) was a British trade unionist.

Williams worked in Wallsend as a driller in a shipyard. He joined the Ship Constructive and Shipwrights' Association during World War I. In 1940, he began working full-time for the union, and also won election to its executive committee.

In 1948, the union's assistant general secretary, John Willcocks, was elected as general secretary, and Williams won the election to become his assistant. In 1957, when Willcocks retired, Williams overwhelmingly won the election to replace him, taking 3,997 votes, while his four opponents took fewer than 1,000 votes between them.

As general secretary, Williams immediately led the union in a Confederation of Shipbuilding and Engineering Unions strike, calling for an increase in wages. This was successful, although the increase was smaller than requested. Employment in the shipyards was in decline, and the union's membership also fell. This led Williams to agree to agree to a Trades Union Congress proposal that the union merge into the United Society of Boilermakers, Shipbuilders and Structural Workers. He remained secretary of the union's new shipwrights section until his retirement, at the end of 1964.

Trade union offices
Preceded by Sydney Ombler	Assistant General Secretary of the Shipconstructors' and Shipwrights' Association; 1949–1957	Succeeded by John Dennett
Preceded by Sydney Ombler	General Secretary of the Shipconstructors' and Shipwrights' Association; 1957–1963	Succeeded by Union merged
Preceded by New position	Secretary of the Shipwrights' Section of the United Society of Boilermakers; 1963–1964	Succeeded by John Dennett
