= William Westwood =

William Westwood may refer to:

- William Westwood (bushranger) (1821–1846), British-born Australian convict and bushranger (alias Jackey Jackey)
- William Westwood, 1st Baron Westwood (1880–1953), British trade unionist and Labour politician
- William James Westwood (1887–1954), Canadian politician
- William Westwood, 2nd Baron Westwood (1907–1991), British peer and former chairman of Newcastle United, son of the 1st Baron
- William John Westwood (1925–1999), British bishop
