= Ted Hill, Baron Hill of Wivenhoe =

British trade unionist (1899–1969)

Edward James Hill, Baron Hill of Wivenhoe (20 August 1899 – 14 December 1969), known as Ted Hill, was a British trade unionist. Known as a shrewd negotiator, Hill frequently succeeded in "wresting many concessions from unwilling employers."

Born in West Ham, London, Hill was one of 12 children in a family with strong socialist traditions. He served with the Royal Marine Engineers during World War I, joining the United Society of Boilermakers and Iron and Steel Shipbuilders in 1916. He spent time mending boilers for P&O, and in his spare time was a wrestler. In 1934, he worked alongside Anuerin Bevan to organise a national hunger march.

By 1939, Hill was the London delegate to the executive committee of the Boilermakers, and in 1948 he was elected to the General Council of the Trades Union Congress (TUC). In 1949, he was elected as General Secretary of the union, and soon acquired a reputation as a left-winger, aligned with the Labour Party but often critical of its policies – a supporter of unilateral disarmament and generally an opponent of militarism. In 1953, he was censured by the TUC for making a speech contrary to its policies, the first occasion on which the body is known to have censured one of the members of its General Council. During the UK engineering strike, 1957, he famously asked "what's in this productivity for my members?"

Hill was a colourful and larger-than-life figure, weighing in more than 16 stone (100 kg). According to The Times, Hill was a "constant source of anxiety and embarrassment to his more orthodox T.U.C. colleagues. The cloth cap "image" he created did not fit into their concept of responsible and respectable trade unionism and they regarded his ideas of class warfare as an anachronism in the mid-twentieth century."

In 1961, Hill served as President of the TUC. Following a succession of demarcation disputes, Hill led a 1962 merger with two other unions with large presences in shipyards, the Associated Blacksmiths, Forge and Smithy Workers' Society and the Shipconstructors and Shipwrights' Association, remaining leader of the renamed "Amalgamated Society of Boilermakers, Shipwrights, Blacksmiths and Structural Workers". He also became President of the Confederation of Shipbuilding and Engineering Unions. In 1965, he retired from all his union posts, joining the Central Training Council. Two years later, on 21 September 1967 he accepted a life peerage, taking the title Baron Hill of Wivenhoe, of Wivenhoe in the County of Essex, having taken his title from the town of Wivenhoe, where he lived in a terraced house.

He died in hospital in Colchester, aged 70.

After Hill's death, Josef Frolik claimed that he had been a KGB informer; Hill's widow strongly denied the claim.

Trade union offices
Preceded by Mark Hodgson	General Secretary of the United Society of Boilermakers and Iron and Steel Shipbuilders; 1948–1965	Succeeded by Danny McGarvey
Preceded by Mark Hodgson	Shipbuilding Group representative on the General Council of the TUC; 1948–1965	Succeeded by Danny McGarvey
Preceded by Claude Bartlett	President of the Trades Union Congress; 1961	Succeeded by Anne Godwin
Preceded by John McFarlane Boyd	President of the Confederation of Shipbuilding and Engineering Unions; 1964–1965	Succeeded by Alf Roberts
