= Jimmy Jarvie =

British trade unionist (1919–1970)

James Neil Jarvie (12 July 1919 – 10 October 1970) was a British trade unionist who became the leader of the Blacksmiths union.

Jarvie was born in Dunbartonshire. His father was a left-wing coal miner, who was victimised after the UK general strike. Unable to find work, the family moved to Fife, and then to Canada. By the mid-1930s, the family had returned to Fife, and Jarvie undertook an apprenticeship as a blacksmith in Dunfermline.

As soon as he completed his apprenticeship, Jarvie was elected as secretary of his local branch of the Associated Blacksmiths', Forge and Smithy Workers' Society. He relocated to Leith, working at Robb's Shipyard, where he was convener of the shop stewards. He was a popular speaker, and was also active in the Communist Party of Great Britain. In addition, he was a delegate to Edinburgh Trades Council, and was chair of the council in 1954/55.

Jarvie continued his rise to prominence by becoming the full-time East of Scotland District Secretary for the Blacksmiths, also spending time representing the shipyards on the River Clyde. In 1954, he was elected as assistant general secretary of the union, and then in 1960 he became the Blacksmiths' general secretary. He supported amalgamations of unions in the shipbuilding trades, and as such he organised a merger with the United Society of Boilermakers, Shipbuilders and Structural Workers, which renamed itself as the "Amalgamated Society of Boilermakers, Shipwrights, Blacksmiths and Structural Workers".

Jarvie became the assistant general secretary of the new union. From 1960 to 1963, he also served on the General Council of the Scottish Trades Union Congress. He died in 1970, aged 51.

Trade union offices
Preceded by William J. Michael	General Secretary of the Associated Blacksmiths', Forge and Smithy Workers' Society; 1960–1962	Succeeded by Position abolished
