= William Mosses =

British trade unionist

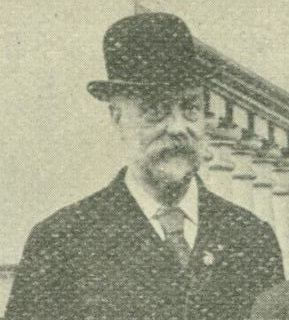
Mosses in 1918, while on a trade union delegation to Washington DC

William Mosses (1858 – 17 May 1943) was a British trade unionist.

Mosses was elected as general secretary of the United Patternmakers Association in 1884, and served in the post for 33 years. He supported Robert Knight's initiative to found the Federation of Engineering and Shipbuilding Trades, a loose body bringing together a variety of craft unions, and he served as its first general secretary, from 1890.

Mosses was also active in the Trades Union Congress (TUC); he served on its Parliamentary Committee from 1907 to 1911, and again from 1913 until 1917. In 1905, he was the TUC delegate to the American Federation of Labour.

Mosses resigned all his trade union positions in 1917 to take up a government post.

William Mosses was one of the first civilians to receive an OBE from George V on 24 September 2017.

Trade union offices
Preceded by R. Reay	General Secretary of the United Patternmakers Association; 1884–1917	Succeeded by Allan Findlay
Preceded by New position	General Secretary of the Federation of Engineering and Shipbuilding Trades; 1890 – 1917	Succeeded by Frank Smith
Preceded by William Abraham and James Wignall	Trades Union Congress representative to the American Federation of Labour; 1905; With: David Gilmour	Succeeded by Joseph Nicholas Bell and Allan Gee
