= June Ling =

American mechanical engineer

June Ling is a retired American mechanical engineer who worked for many years on standardization at the American Society of Mechanical Engineers (ASME).

== Education and career ==
Ling majored in physics at the City College of New York and began working at the ASME in 1974. She became director of nuclear and safety codes and standards in 1985, director of pressure technology codes and standards in 1990, managing director of operations in 1992, and associate executive director of standards and certification in 1995. She retired in 2015.

== Recognition ==
Ling was elected as an ASME Fellow in 1997. She is also an honorary member of ASTM International and a Fellow of the Standards Engineering Society.

ASTM International gave Ling their W. T. Cavanaugh Memorial Award in 2003, "for her outstanding leadership and tireless promotion of technically sound and market-relevant United States-developed voluntary consensus standards as international standards". Ling was the 2009 winner of the Astin-Polk International Standards Medal of the American National Standards Institute, for "distinguished service in promoting trade and understanding among nations through the advancement, development, or administration of international standardization, measurements, or certification". In 2010 she won the ASME Melvin R. Green Codes and Standards Medal. Ling won the 2015 National Board Safety Medal of the National Board of Boiler and Pressure Vessel Inspectors.
