= Paul Kenny (trade unionist) =

British trade union leader

Sir Paul Kenny

8th General Secretary of GMB
- In office 24 March 2005 – 31 December 2015
- Preceded by: Kevin Curran
- Succeeded by: Tim Roache

President of the Trades Union Congress
- In office 2012
- Preceded by: Michael J. Leahy
- Succeeded by: Lesley Mercer

Personal details
- Born: 31 October 1949 (age 77) Hammersmith, London, England

Sir Paul Stephen Kenny (born 31 October 1949) is a British former trade union leader. He served as General Secretary of the GMB, Britain's third biggest union.

== Early life ==
Kenny left school at 15 and went to work for Fuller, Smith & Turner's Brewery. He went to Latimer Foundation School in Hammersmith, which was closed; he was transferred to St Marks School at Bishops Park in Fulham. His first job in local government was for London Borough of Hammersmith as the park keeper of Brook Green, along with its tennis courts.

== Trade unions ==
Kenny became a full-time GMB official in December 1979. In 1991 he became the Regional Secretary of the GMB London Region.

=== GMB leadership ===
Kenny had been defeated by Kevin Curran in the 2003 GMB General Secretary Election to replace John Edmonds. However, he was appointed Acting General Secretary on 24 March 2005 following Curran's resignation after alleged election rigging.

In May 2006 he was elected unopposed as GMB General Secretary. He was elected again in 2010 for a further five years unopposed.

Between 2010 and 2016, he was the chair of the influential Trade Union & Labour Party Liaison Organisation.

=== Campaigns ===
Kenny has been heavily involved in campaigns, including ASDA, private equity companies (such as their ownership of the AA), public sector pay increases, and privatised utility companies. He led target campaigning against blacklisting of trade unionists by the construction industry. In August 2014, Kenny was one of 200 public figures who were signatories to a letter to The Guardian opposing Scottish independence in the run-up to September's referendum on that issue.

== Personal life ==
Kenny now lives on the Isle of Wight. He married Patricia Ward in 1969 in Hammersmith. He has two sons and four grandchildren, and supports Fulham F.C.

In the 2015 Queen's Birthday Honours, Kenny was appointed a Knight Bachelor "for services to trades unions".

Trade union offices
Preceded by Kevin Curran	General Secretary of the GMB; 2005–2015	Succeeded by Tim Roache
Preceded by Michael J. Leahy	President of the Trades Union Congress; 2011–2012	Succeeded by Lesley Mercer
