= James Conley =

James Conley may refer to:

- James D. Conley, bishop of the Roman Catholic Diocese of Lincoln, Nebraska
- Jim Conley, associated with the murder trial of Leo Frank
- James Conley (baseball)
- James Conley (trade unionist) (1850–c. 1922), British trade unionist
- James Conley, actor in Madame Du Barry (1917 film)
