= Baron Westwood =

Barony in the Peerage of the United Kingdom

Baron Westwood, of Gosforth in the County of Northumberland, is a title in the Peerage of the United Kingdom. It was created in 1944 for the trade unionist William Westwood. He was General Secretary of the Ship Constructors' and Shipwrights' Association (now part of GMB Union) from 1929 to 1945. As of 2019 the title is held by his great-grandson, the fourth Baron, who succeeded his father in that year.

== Barons Westwood (1944) ==
- William Westwood, 1st Baron Westwood (1880–1953)
- William Westwood, 2nd Baron Westwood (1907–1991)
- William Gavin Westwood, 3rd Baron Westwood (1944–2019)
- (William) Fergus Westwood, 4th Baron Westwood (b. 1972)

The heir presumptive is the present holder's younger brother Hon. Alistair Cameron Westwood (b. 1974).

Coat of arms of Baron Westwood
Crest A mullet Argent charged with a thistle slipped and leaved Proper. Escutcheon Argent a lion rampant Gules between three lymphads Sable flags flying to the dexter of the second. Supporters On either side a sea-lion Argent charged on the shoulder with two anchors in saltire Sable. Motto Deeds Not Words
