= United Kingdom Society of Amalgamated Smiths and Strikers =

Former trade union of the United Kingdom

- Merged into: Amalgamated Engineering Union
- Founded: 1886
- Dissolved: 1920
- Headquarters: Stockton-on-Tees
- Location: United Kingdom
- Members: 14,080 (1920)
- Key people: George Ashcroft (Gen Sec)
- Affiliations: TUC, FEST, GFTU

The United Kingdom Society of Amalgamated Smiths and Strikers was a trade union representing foundry workers in the United Kingdom.

The union's origins lay in the Sons of Vulcan Smiths and Strikers, a union representing workers in northern England and Derbyshire. This union gave its name to numerous pubs in the region.

In 1886, the union was refounded as the "United Kingdom Society of Amalgamated Smiths and Strikers". It grew quickly, and became the main rival of the Associated Blacksmiths', Forge and Smithy Workers' Society, particularly in railshops. In 1891, it was a founder of the Federation of Engineering and Shipbuilding Trades. By the following year, it had 2,200 members, and membership reached 4,347 in 1899, at which point it was the largest union in the industry. However growth stalled, and by 1910 membership had fallen to 2,731.

During the 1910, the union undertook lengthy but unsuccessful negotiations about a possible merger with the Associated Blacksmiths. It grew rapidly during World War I and by 1920 had more than 14,000 members. That year, it merged with the Amalgamated Society of Engineers and other smaller unions to form the Amalgamated Engineering Union.
