= Sue Ferns =

British trade unionist

Susan Elizabeth Ferns OBE (born 27 October 1960) is a British trade unionist.

Born in Sheffield, Ferns studied at Salford University. In 1982, she began working for the Trades Union Congress (TUC) as a policy officer. In 1993, she moved to work as a research officer at the Institution of Professionals Managers and Specialists. This union merged into Prospect in 2001, and the following year, Ferns became its head of research. In 2005, she was elected as a member of the General Council of the TUC.

In 2013, Ferns became the Prospect's director of communications and research, and then in 2018 its senior deputy general secretary. From 2007 until 2022, Ferns was also chair of Unions 21, and since 2012 has been chair of the Trade Union Sustainable Development Advisory Committee. She was appointed to the government's Green Jobs Task Force in 2021.

In 2021, Ferns was elected as President of the Trades Union Congress, in which role she focused on campaigning to close the gender pay gap and pensions gap.

Trade union offices
Preceded by Gail Cartmail	President of the Trades Union Congress; 2022–2023	Succeeded by Maria Exall
