= William Carron, Baron Carron =

British trade unionist and activist

The Right Honourable The Lord Carron KSG FRSA
- Baron Carron in 1963

Personal details
- Born: William John Carron; 19 November 1902 Hull, England
- Died: 3 December 1969 (aged 67) Forest Hill, London, England
- Occupation: Trade unionist

William John Carron, Baron Carron, KSG, FRSA (19 November 1902 – 3 December 1969) was a British trade unionist and activist, who served as president of the Amalgamated Engineering Union (AEU) from 1956 until 1967.

== Early life ==
Carron was born in Kingston upon Hull in 1902, the son of John Carron and Frances Ann Richardson. He attended St Mary's Roman Catholic Primary School, Hull Technical College, and he earned a Master of Arts degree from Oxford University.

== Career ==
Beginning in 1918 Carron was apprenticed to a turner, Messrs Rose, at Downs and Thompson Ltd. until he became a journeyman in 1923. In 1935 he moved to the maintenance department of Reckitt and Coleman and became a shop steward of the AEU.

Carron joined the AEU in 1924. He was a branch secretary from 1932 to 1945. He later became district president. In 1950 he was elected to the post of divisional organizer and in 1956 he became an executive councillor. Finally, he was elected president in 1956, a position he held until 1967. He also served as a member of the General Council of the Trades Union Congress from 1954 to 1968.

Carron became a director of the Bank of England in 1963 and in 1967 he became a director of the United Kingdom Atomic Energy Authority.

== Honours and awards ==
In October 1959, the Catholic Church appointed him a Knight of the Order of St. Gregory the Great, and he became a Knight Bachelor in 1963.

He became Baron Carron, of the City and County of Kingston upon Hull, on 11 July 1967.

Coat of arms of William Carron, Baron Carron

Crest
An eagle rising Proper gorged with an ancient crown Or the dexter paw resting on a cogwheel Sable in the beak a trefoil Vert.
Escutcheon
Azure a pile Or charged with a pile Gules thereon a passion cross Argent overall on a chief Or a carronade Proper the whole surmounted by a chain in orle Argent.
Supporters
Dexter a beaver sinister a wolf both Proper and gorged with an ancient crown Or.
Motto
In Veritate Atque Fortitudine

== Personal life ==
He married Mary Emma McGuire on 5 August 1931, with whom he had two daughters, Hilary Mary Carron and Patricia Anne Carron.

He retired to Forest Hill, London, where he died in 1969, aged 67.

== Sources ==
- Fishman, Nina (January 2009). "Carron, William John, Baron Carron (1902–1969)". Oxford Dictionary of National Biography (online ed.). Oxford University Press. doi:10.1093/ref:odnb/66089. (Subscription, Wikipedia Library access or UK public library membership required.)
- Lord Carron's papers at Churchill Archives Centre, Cambridge

Trade union offices
| Preceded by Robert Openshaw | President of the Amalgamated Engineering Union; 1956–1967 | Succeeded by Hugh Scanlon |
| Preceded by Harry Douglass and Anne Godwin | Trades Union Congress representative to the AFL-CIO; 1965; With: George Lowthian | Succeeded by Jack Cooper and Harry Nicholas |
| Preceded by William Tallon | President of the Confederation of Shipbuilding and Engineering Unions; 1967–1968 | Succeeded by Leonard Green |
