= Bartholomew Walsh =

Welsh trade unionist

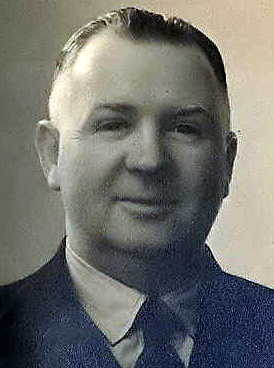

Bartholomew Walsh OBE (1890 – 13 December 1959) was a Welsh trade unionist.

Born in Ferndale in the Rhondda, Walsh began working at a colliery as his father had before him. He joined the South Wales Miners' Federation (SWMF) in 1904. In 1929, he was promoted to a more senior role at his workplace, and so left the SWMF, joining the National Association of Colliery Overmen, Deputies and Shotfirers (NACODS).

Walsh was soon elected to the national executive of NACODS, and in the 1940s became its first full-time general secretary. He worked hard to improve mine safety whilst in post. He also represented the union at the Trades Union Congress (TUC), and served on the General Council of the TUC in 1950, and again from 1957 until he died, late in 1959.

In his spare time, Walsh was active in the Labour Party, the Wesleyan Methodist Church, a volunteer fireman in the local community and served as a magistrate. He also sat on the Safety in Mines Research Advisory Board and a government committee investigating the Coal Mines (Explosives) Order.

Trade union offices
Preceded by J. W. Sumnall	General Secretary of the National Association of Colliery Overmen, Deputies and Shotfirers; 1947 – 1959	Succeeded by Joseph Crawford
