= Engineering and Fastener Trade Union =

Former trade union of the United Kingdom

EFTU
- Engineering and Fastener Trade Union
- Founded: 1914
- Dissolved: 2004
- Headquarters: 368 Dudley Road, Birmingham
- Location: United Kingdom
- Members: 4,000 (1977)
- Affiliations: TUC, CSEU, GFTU

The Engineering and Fastener Trade Union was a trade union based in the West Midlands of England.

== History ==
The union was founded in 1914 as the Screw Nut Bolt and Rivet Trade Union. It represented workers who used machinery to make screws, nuts, bolts and rivets. As the handmade section of the industry declined, it gained members from the National Amalgamated Society of Nut and Bolt Makers. Its membership remained just below 2,000 from the mid-1920s to 1956, when it affiliated to the Trades Union Congress. By 1977, membership was estimated at 4,000. In 1989, the union changed its name to the "Engineering and Fastener Trade Union". By the mid-1990s, membership was down to 240, all of whom worked at GKN. The union was dissolved in 2004.

== General Secretaries ==
J. R. Smith
1940s: F. A. Smith
1950s: H. Cater
1981: E. C. Bowcott
1988: W. Redmond
1990: J. Burdis
2000: A. Evans
