= Mohammad Taj =

Mohammad Taj (born 1952) is a Pakistani-born British trade unionist.

Born in Kunjar Mal, a small village in Mirpur, Taj immigrated to Bradford in England in 1966. He learned to speak English, then studied at Bradford College. He began working in the textile industry at James Tankard and Leigh Mills, where he attempted to join the National Union of Dyers, Bleachers and Textile Workers, but was rejected as it would only admit white workers. He moved into sales, then became a bus conductor with Bradford City Transport. As soon as he was old enough, he became a bus driver. He became aware that many Asian workers were having to pay bribes to corrupt managers and union officials to work in the industry. In order to get the complaints investigated, he joined the Transport and General Workers' Union (TGWU), and successfully ended the practice, with several guilty people being sentenced to prison time.

In 1982, Taj was elected as the shop steward at Bradford City Transport, then in 1992 he became a worker-director at Yorkshire Rider. He chaired the TGWU's race equality conference and served on its executive council. In 1995, he served on the commission to investigate the causes of the Manningham riot. The following year, he returned to driving buses, for First West Yorkshire.

Taj served on the General Council of the Trades Union Congress (TUC) for many years, and from 2013 to 2014 he served as President of the TUC, the first Muslim and first Asian to hold the post. He retired soon afterwards, and in 2018 his autobiography was published by Unite, the successor of the TGWU. He was made an Officer of the Order of the British Empire in the 2017 New Year Honours.

Trade union offices
Preceded by Lesley Mercer	President of the Trades Union Congress; 2013–2014	Succeeded by Leslie Manasseh
