= Alan Findlay =

Scottish trade unionist

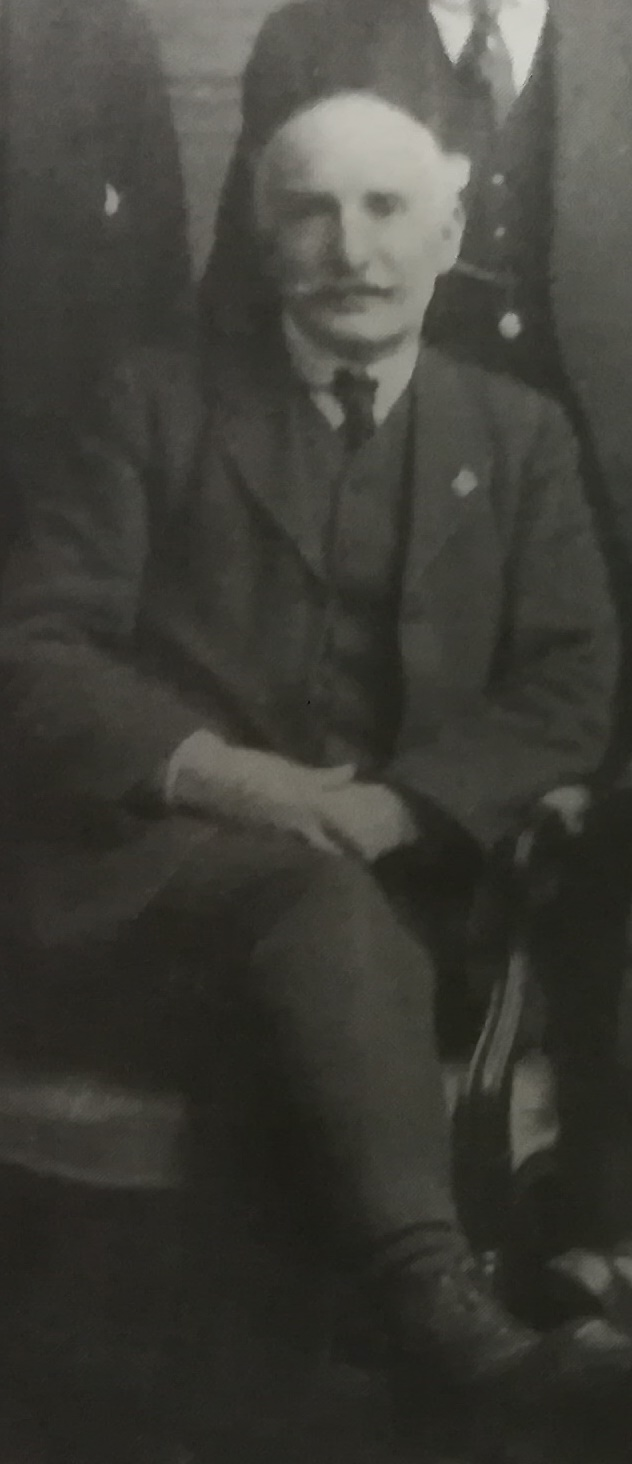
Findlay in 1921

Alan Andrew Hart Findlay (1873 – 15 November 1943) was a Scottish trade unionist.

Born in Hurlford in Ayrshire, Findlay worked in the lace industry, as a coal-miner, and as a railway worker, then in an engineering plant and as a railway worker. There, he became involved in the United Patternmakers' Association, and in 1913 was elected as its Assistant General Secretary, followed in 1917 by election as General Secretary.

Findlay represented the Patternmakers on the Federation of Engineering and Shipbuilding Trades, serving as its treasurer from 1921, then as its president from 1923 to 1925. He was elected to the General Council of the Trades Union Congress (TUC) in 1921, and served as President of the TUC in 1935/36.

Findlay retired from his union post in 1940, and served as a member of a British industry mission to the United States the following year. He died in 1943, aged 70.

Trade union offices
Preceded by New position	Assistant General Secretary of the United Patternmakers' Association; 1913–1917	Succeeded by John Mills
Preceded by William Mosses	General Secretary of the United Patternmakers Association; 1917–1940	Succeeded by Wilfred Beard
Preceded by James Bell and James Thomas Brownlie	Trades Union Congress representative to the American Federation of Labour; 1930; With: Arthur Shaw	Succeeded by John Beard and Frank Wolstencroft
Preceded by William Kean	President of the Trades Union Congress; 1935/36	Succeeded by Ernest Bevin
