= Associated Blacksmiths', Forge and Smithy Workers' Society =

Former trade union of the United Kingdom

The Associated Blacksmiths, Forge and Smithy Workers' Society (ABFSWS) was a trade union representing metalworkers in the United Kingdom and Ireland.

== History ==
The union was founded in 1857 in Glasgow as the Scottish United Operative Blacksmiths Protection and Friendly Society. In 1872, it became the Associated Blacksmiths of Scotland, but then decided to organise throughout the UK, in 1885 becoming the Associated Blacksmiths' Society. Around 1910s, it became the Associated Blacksmiths and Iron Workers' Society.

Membership was around 3,000 for many years, but grew rapidly under the leadership of John Thomson in the 1910s. He focused on mergers with smaller unions, bringing in the Combined Smiths of Great Britain and Ireland, the Co-operative Society of Smiths, the National United Society of Smiths and Hammermen, and the United Smiths Trade Union of Ireland. This brought membership up to 13,500 by 1915, and made it the largest union of blacksmiths in the country, ahead of the Amalgamated Society of Smiths and Strikers.

In 1963, the union merged with the Shipconstructors' and Shipwrights' Association into the United Society of Boilermakers, Shipbuilders and Structural Workers, which renamed itself as the "Amalgamated Society of Boilermakers, Shipwrights, Blacksmiths and Structural Workers".

== Election results ==
The union sponsored a Labour Party candidate in 1929.

Election	Constituency	Candidate	Votes	Percentage	Position
1929 general election	Chorley	William Taylor	18,369	42.4	2

== General Secretaries ==
1857: James M'Lean
1859: David Stuart
1863: John Inglis
1907: John Thomson
1919: William Lorimer
1948: William J. Michael
1960: Jimmy Jarvie
