= Percy Hanley =

British trade unionist (1905–1973)

Percy Hanley (29 May 1905 – 18 September 1973) was a British trade unionist.

Hanley joined the Amalgamated Engineering Union (AEU) in 1924, and became increasingly prominent in the union. Based in Peterborough, he worked as the union's part-time district secretary. During this period, he was a delegate to its national conference on five occasions, serving on its standing orders committee for five of these.

In 1950, Hanley began working full-time for the union, as divisional organiser of its number 12 district. Six years later, he narrowly defeated Edwin Boyce to become executive councillor for division number 5, which covered Sheffield and the East Midlands. He held this seat in 1964, when he beat Boyce by an even smaller margin, being seen as the more right-wing of the two candidates. During this period, he served as staff-side secretary on the Whitley Councils for the Air Ministry and Civil Air Transport. From 1966, he instead took the lead on railway-related workers in the union.

Hanley was elected to the National Executive Committee of the Labour Party in 1967, but served only a single year, as in 1968 he was instead elected to the General Council of the Trades Union Congress. In 1969/70, he additionally served as president of the Confederation of Shipbuilding and Engineering Unions.

Hanley retired from all his union posts in 1970, and was succeeded on the executive council by Les Dixon, a member of the Communist Party of Great Britain. In retirement, he served on the Metrication Board.

Trade union offices
Preceded by Leonard Green	President of the Confederation of Shipbuilding and Engineering Unions; 1969–1970	Succeeded by Jack Youngs
