= Alf Roberts (trade unionist) =

British trade unionist

Alfred Roberts (1910 – 19 September 1971) was a British trade unionist.

Born in Manchester, Roberts worked as a coach builder, and joined the National Union of Vehicle Builders (NUVB) in 1925. He worked for a while in Dublin, during which time he frequently attended the Irish Trades Union Congress and served on its Northern Ireland Committee. In 1942, he became secretary of the union's Sheffield branch, and was soon elected to its national executive. After becoming a full-time organiser for the NUVB's York and North-Eastern division in 1951, he was elected as assistant general secretary of the union, in 1953.

In 1962, Roberts was elected as general secretary of the union. His tenure was a difficult period for the union; he was known as a moderate figure and was able to maintain a membership of 85,000. In 1967, he was also elected to the General Council of the Trades Union Congress.

Roberts negotiated a merger between the NUVB and the Transport and General Workers' Union (TGWU); as part of the agreement, he was due to become an executive officer of the TGWU, ranking among its three leading figures. However, he died in 1971, before the merger took place.

Trade union offices
Preceded by F. S. Winchester	General Secretary of the National Union of Vehicle Builders; 1962–1971	Succeeded by Granville Hawley
Preceded by Ted Hill	President of the Confederation of Shipbuilding and Engineering Unions; 1965–1966	Succeeded by William Tallon
