= Lesley Mercer =

British trade unionist

Helen Lesley Mercer (born August 1954) is a former British trade unionist.

Born in Great Harwood, Mercer was educated at the Accrington High School for Girls and the University of Nottingham. In 1977, she became an assistant research officer with the Merchant Navy and Airline Officers' Association. She later worked for the National Union of Civil and Public Servants, then in 1995 began working for the Chartered Society of Physiotherapy (CSP). In 2005, she was appointed as head of the CSP's trade union function.

Mercer was elected to the General Council of the Trades Union Congress (TUC) in 2000, and served as President of the TUC from 2012 to 2013, the first representative of a professional organisation to hold the post. She also served on the Central Arbitration Committee and the steering group of the NHS Social Partnership Forum. She retired in 2014, but became a trustee director of Nautilus International, receiving its Nevins and Griffiths Award in 2025.

Trade union offices
Preceded by Paul Kenny	President of the Trades Union Congress; 2012–2013	Succeeded by Mohammad Taj
