= Joseph Crawford (trade unionist) =

British trade unionist

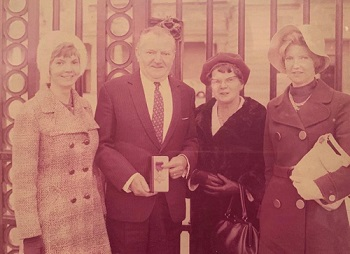
After receiving his OBE, with wife and daughters.

Joseph Crawford, OBE (2 April 1910 –16 August 1997) was a British trade unionist.

Joseph Crawford was born in New Kyo, Annfield Plain in County Durham, where he attended the local school, then began working as a coal miner at the age of fourteen.

He married Hannah Jane Horswill on 3 June 1933. They had three children Jean (b-1937), Pauline (b-1944, d-2010), and Trevor (b-1946)

At the age of 29, he was promoted to become a deputy, and joined the National Association of Colliery Overmen, Deputies and Shotfirers (NACODS). He became increasingly active in the union, as secretary of his local branch, then as general secretary of its Durham area and a member of the National Council. In 1953, he was elected as the union's vice president, then in 1956 he became its president, and finally in 1960 he was elected as general secretary of the national union.

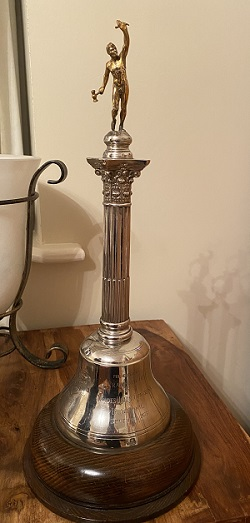
Bell presented to him

As leader of the union, Joe Crawford represented it at the Trades Union Congress (TUC), and he served on its General Council. Between 1972 and 1973, he was the President of the TUC. He retired from his trade union posts later that year.

Joe spoke at many conferences around the globe including being presented a gold Harvard University graduation ring for attending and speaking at a seminar at the university whilst in America.

In his spare time, Joe also served on the Mining Qualifications Board, as a governor of Ruskin College, the United World College of the Atlantic, and Welbeck College, and was a member of the council of St George's House (Windsor Castle). He was made an Officer of the Order of the British Empire in the 1971 Birthday Honours. for his services to the Mining Industry (particularly towards working conditions and Health and Safety). He also served for many years as a Methodist lay preacher and was deeply religious.

Trade union offices
| Preceded by Bartholomew Walsh | General Secretary of the National Association of Colliery Overmen, Deputies and Shotfirers; 1960–1973 | Succeeded by Arthur E. Simpson |
| Preceded by George Smith | President of the Trades Union Congress; 1972/73 | Succeeded by Alfred Allen |
