= Samuel McLaren (trade unionist) =

Samuel P. McLaren was a Scottish trade unionist and political activist.

McLaren worked as a patternmaker in Greenock, joining the United Patternmakers' Association (UPA), and becoming the chair of the Greenock Trades and Labour Council. He was a supporter of the Labour Party, and at the 1935 United Kingdom general election, was selected as its candidate in Glasgow Bridgeton. However, the seat was held by James Maxton, the popular leader of the Independent Labour Party, and McLaren took last place, with only 2.2% of the vote.

McLaren next stood for Parliament in East Fife at the 1945 United Kingdom general election, as a Labour Co-operative candidate. He took second place, with 30.6% of the vote, and at the 1950 United Kingdom general election, he fell back to 26.5%.

Following his last defeat, McLaren focused on trade unionism. By 1959, he was the assistant and financial secretary of the UPA, and had relocated to work at its head office in London. In 1967, he was elected as the union's general secretary. Under his leadership, the union attempted to broaden its membership, by renaming itself as the Association of Patternmakers and Allied Craftsmen. He stood down in 1969.

Trade union offices
Preceded by Wilfred Beard	General Secretary of the United Patternmakers' Association; 1967–1969	Succeeded by Gerry Eastwood
