= Frank Purdy =

British trade unionist

William Frank Purdy (1872 – 1929) was a British trade unionist.

Based in Newcastle-upon-Tyne, Purdy was active in the Shipconstructors' and Shipwrights' Association, and became its Assistant General Secretary by 1920. He succeeded Alexander Wilkie as the union's Acting General Secretary shortly before Wilkie's death in 1928, but Purdy himself died the following year before he could stand for election to the permanent post.

Purdy was also a member of the National Executive Committee of the Labour Party. He moved that George Wardle preside over the 1917 party conference as acting chair, and Purdy was then elected as chairman for 1917/18.

Party political offices
Preceded by George Wardle	Chairman of the Labour Party; 1917/18	Succeeded by John McGurk
Trade union offices
Preceded by Alexander Wilkie	Acting General Secretary of the Ship Constructive and Shipwrights' Association; 1928–1929	Succeeded by William Westwood
