= Ged Nichols =

British trade union leader (born 1962)

Ged Nichols (born 1962) is a British trade union leader.

Nichols grew up in Liverpool, and left school at the age of sixteen, to work for the Halifax Building Society. On his first day, he joined the recently founded Halifax Building Society Staff Association. He studied part-time while becoming increasingly active in the union, including a spell as its North West Region Health and Safety Officer.

In 1988, Nichols moved to Reading, Berkshire, to work full-time as a national officer for the union. He was elected as its general secretary in 1992, aged 30. In 2002, the union became known as "Accord". As leader of the union, he gained a reputation as a strong negotiator, and advocated what he described as "constructive industrial relations". He became a director of the Involvement and Participation Association.

Nichols was elected to the General Council of the Trades Union Congress (TUC) in 2000, and became President of the TUC for 2019/20. Also in 2019, he was appointed to the board of the Health and Safety Executive.

Nichols' daughter, Charlotte Nichols, is Labour Party Member of Parliament for Warrington North.

Trade union offices
Preceded by David Nash	General Secretary of Accord; 1992–present	Succeeded by Incumbent
Preceded by Mark Serwotka	President of the Trades Union Congress; 2019–2020	Succeeded by Gail Cartmail
