= Kevin Curran (trade unionist) =

British trade unionist

Kevin Barry Curran (born 20 August 1954) is a British former trade unionist.

Curran left school and worked as a welder, installing boilers at power stations. Concerned about asbestos at Thurrock Power Station, he became a shop steward in his trade union, organising a walkout which won better working conditions there. He studied at the London School of Economics on a union bursary from 1979 but, on completing his studies, was unable to find work in the industry, believing himself to have been blacklisted for his union activities.

Curran found work running a training scheme for welders, and continued his activity in what became the GMB. He began working-full time for the union as a regional health and safety officer in 1988, and was promoted to regional organiser in 1990. He later became a regional industrial organiser, then regional secretary for the north, before being elected as general secretary in 2003. He defeated Paul Kenny in the election, but was accused of breaking the union's campaign rules. He denied the allegations, but was suspended from office in 2005 as the investigation continued, and opted to resign from the post.

Curran took a post as an international co-ordinator for the International Union of Food and Allied Workers, then in 2007 left trade unionism to become a tree surgeon.

Trade union offices
| Preceded by John Edmonds | General Secretary of the GMB; 2003–2005 | Succeeded by Paul Kenny |
