= David Basnett =

British trade union leader (1924–1989)

David Basnett, Baron Basnett (9 February 1924 – 25 January 1989) was a British trade union leader.

Born in Liverpool, Basnett studied at Quarry Bank High School before becoming a bank clerk. He served as a pilot with the Royal Air Force during World War II, then in 1948 began working for the National Union of General and Municipal Workers (NUGMW), as their regional officer for Liverpool.

In 1955, Basnett became the NUGMW's national education officer, while, in 1960, he was appointed national industrial officer, and in 1966 he was elected to the general council of the Trades Union Congress (TUC). In 1970, he negotiated a satisfactory settlement to a major dispute at Pilkington, and he used this success as a springboard to win election as the union's general secretary in 1973.

As general secretary, Basnett pursued a campaign of centralisation, aimed to increase participation, and conducted numerous mergers with smaller unions, the NUGMW changing its name twice under his leadership, becoming the "General, Municipal, Boilermakers and Allied Trades Union" in 1982. He served as president of the TUC in 1978, and was also on the National Enterprise Board and the National Economic Development Council.

In 1979, Basnett founded Trade Unionists for a Labour Victory, and spent much of the next decade promoting conference between trade union and Labour Party members. He took early retirement in 1986, frustrated at the lack of progress from these initiatives. He was created a life peer on 31 March 1987 taking the title Baron Basnett, of Leatherhead, in the County of Surrey.

Basnett died on 25 January 1989, at the age of 64.

Trade union offices
| Preceded by Jack Cooper | General Secretary of the National Union of General and Municipal Workers; 1973–1986 | Succeeded by John Edmonds |
| Preceded by Marie Patterson | President of the Trades Union Congress; 1978 | Succeeded by Thomas Jackson |
