= Mark Hodgson =

British labor leader (1880–1967)

Sir Mark Hodgson, OBE (19 November 1880 – 17 October 1967) was a British trade union leader.

== Early life and career ==
Born in Hull, Hodgson grew up in Sunderland, studying at Diamond Hall School before taking an apprenticeship as a plater in the shipyard. He joined the United Society of Boilermakers and Iron and Steel Shipbuilders, and in 1913 became the Tyne and Wear delegate on the union's executive council. From 1923 to 1936, he served as the union's chairman, then was elected as its general secretary.

While general secretary, Hodgson negotiated on behalf of members during World War II, and took a number of local and national positions. In 1938, he was awarded the OBE, and in 1945 he received a knighthood. He stood down as secretary in 1948, taking a job as chairman of the Northern Regional Board for Industry, serving in this role until 1965.

Trade union offices
Preceded by John Hill	General Secretary of the United Society of Boilermakers and Iron and Steel Shipbuilders; 1936–1948	Succeeded by Ted Hill
Preceded by John Hill	Shipbuilding Group representative on the General Council of the TUC; 1936–1948	Succeeded by Ted Hill
Preceded by Harry N. Harrison	President of the Confederation of Shipbuilding and Engineering Unions; 1943 – 1945	Succeeded by John Willcocks
Preceded by John Willcocks	President of the Confederation of Shipbuilding and Engineering Unions; 1947 – 1948	Succeeded by Harry Brotherton
