= Gerry Eastwood =

British trade unionist

Gerald Eastwood (died 2006) was a British trade union leader.

Eastwood worked as an industrial patternmaker, and joined the Association of Patternmakers and Allied Craftsmen (APAC). He was elected as the union's assistant general secretary, then in 1969, as general secretary of the union. Eastwood was regarded as being on the right wing of the trade union movement, and although he frequently stood for election to the General Council of the Trades Union Congress - particularly targeting the seat of Reg Birch - he was never elected. He proved more successful in the Confederation of Shipbuilding and Engineering Unions, serving as its president in 1981/82.

By the early 1980s, APAC's membership had declined to under 10,000, and in 1984 Eastwood led it into a merger with the Technical, Administrative and Supervisory Section (TASS), becoming National Secretary of its new Craft Patternmakers Section. In 1988, TASS became part of the new Manufacturing, Science and Finance union, and Eastwood was appointed as one of its assistant general secretaries, retiring in 1993.

Trade union offices
Preceded by Samuel McLaren	General Secretary of the Association of Patternmakers and Allied Craftsmen; 1969–1984	Succeeded by Union merged
Preceded by Roy Grantham	President of the Confederation of Shipbuilding and Engineering Unions; 1981–1982	Succeeded by Pat Turner
