= D. C. Cummings =

British trade unionist

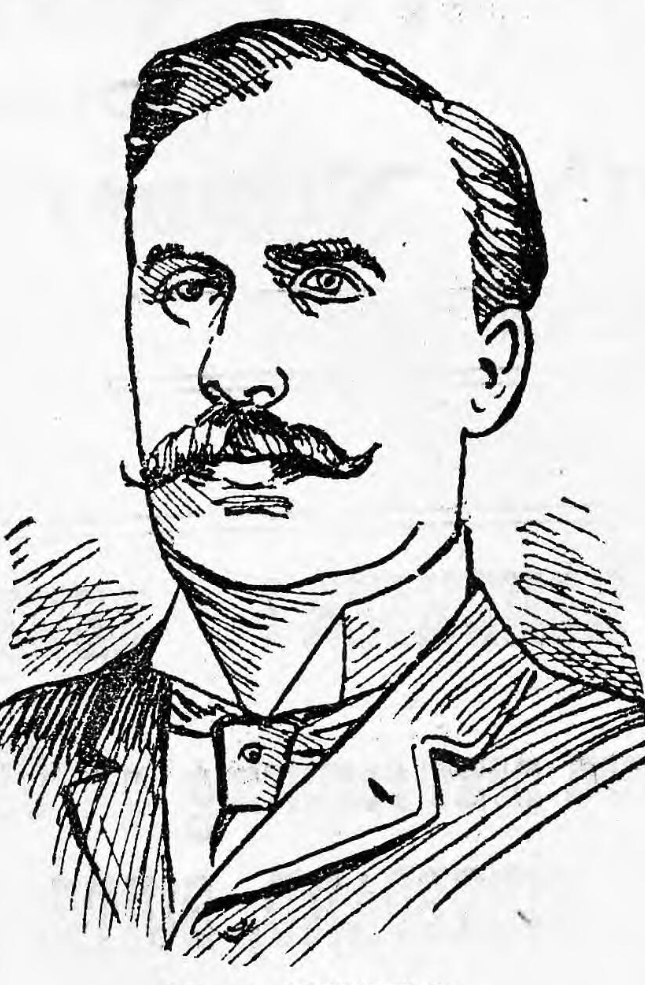
Cummings in 1906

David Charles Cummings (16 December 1861 – 16 April 1942), known as D. C. Cummings, was a British trade unionist.

Born in Greenwich, Cummings was apprenticed in the shipbuilding industry at the age of 14. He joined the United Society of Boilermakers and Iron and Steel Shipbuilders in 1880, becoming active in Leeds, where he was elected to the school board in 1898. He was also active in the Independent Labour Party. He was General Secretary of the union from 1900, and in 1906, he served as President of the Trades Union Congress. In 1908, he left his trade union posts to work for the Board of Trade, and had a lengthy career in the civil service, including membership of the Industrial Court from 1919 until 1940. In 1927, he was elected to Lewisham Borough Council.

Trade union offices
Preceded by Robert Knight	General Secretary of the United Society of Boilermakers and Iron and Steel Shipbuilders; 1900–1908	Succeeded by John Hill
Preceded by James Sexton	President of the Trades Union Congress; 1906	Succeeded by Alfred Gill
