= Maria Exall =

British trade unionist (born 1960)

Maria Exall (born August 1960) is a British trade unionist, who was the President of the Trades Union Congress for 2022–23. She was appointed for her work in the Communication Workers Union.

== Education ==
Maria Exall has a PhD in Philosophical Theology from King's College London.

== Trade unionism ==
Exall was a care worker, and joined the Confederation of Health Service Employees. In 1988, she moved to work for the BT Group as a communications engineer, and joined the Communication Workers' Union. She became active with the Trades Union Congress (TUC), specialising on equality in the workplace and liaising with the affiliated Labour Party. Exall supported Jeremy Corbyn in the 2015 Labour Party leadership election.

Exall chairs the TUC LGBT+ Committee, and serves on the General Council of the TUC. She is also a vice-president of the Campaign for Trade Union Freedom. In 2022, she was elected as President of the TUC, the first out LGBT+ person to serve in the post.

== Other work ==
Exall is an honorary fellow of Catholic Social Thought and Practice in the Department of Theology and Religion at Durham University. She was a founder member of the Cutting Edge Consortium, which argued that various exemptions for religious groups should be removed from the Equality Act 2010.

== Personal life ==
Exall is a Catholic. She is also a lesbian and has been in a civil partnership with Dame Angela Eagle since 2008.

Trade union offices
Preceded by Sue Ferns	President of the Trades Union Congress; 2022–2023	Succeeded by Matt Wrack
