= Sydney Ombler =

British trade unionist (1892–1984)

Sydney Ombler OBE (1892 – 5 November 1984) was a British trade unionist.

Born in Kingston upon Hull, Ombler became a shipwright. He served with the Royal Engineers during World War I, then after the war returned to Hull and joined the Ship Constructive and Shipwrights' Association. He gradually rose to prominence in the union, serving as branch secretary for eighteen years. In 1936, he was elected to the union's executive committee, and in 1946, he became the union's assistant general secretary, narrowly defeating John McMillan in an election.

The union's general secretary, John Willcocks, resigned in 1948, and Ombler won the election to succeed him. He complained that he could not afford a house suitable for his family on his salary. So the union agreed to purchase a house for them. Under his leadership, employment in shipbuilding declined, as did the union's membership. He remained the leader of the union until his retirement, in 1957.

In the 1954 Birthday Honours, Ombler was made an Officer of the Order of the British Empire.

Ombler died on 5 November 1984 at the age of 92.

Trade union offices
Preceded by John Willcocks	Assistant General Secretary of the Shipconstructors' and Shipwrights' Association; 1946–1948	Succeeded by Arthur Williams
Preceded by John Willcocks	General Secretary of the Shipconstructors' and Shipwrights' Association; 1948–1957	Succeeded by Arthur Williams
