= Gail Cartmail =

- Born: 1955 (age 70–71)
- Occupation: Trade union official
- Employer: Unite
- Notable work: President of the Trades Union Congress (2020–2021); Acting General Secretary of Unite (2016)
- Title: Assistant General Secretary

Gail Cartmail (born 1955) is an Assistant General Secretary (AGS) at the trade union Unite and also a member of the Trades Union Congress' (TUC) Executive Committee and General Council.

== Career ==
Cartmail attended Heronswood Secondary Modern School in Welwyn Garden City, having failed her eleven plus exam. She left school with no qualifications, Cartmail began her working life as an apprentice hairdresser. Later, she began working in the publishing industry, and eventually became Mother of the Chapel for the print union, the National Graphical Association, where she gained prominence for a campaign for equal pay for women, and studied at the London College of Printing.

In 1977, Cartmail began to work as a trade union liaison officer for the London Borough of Greenwich, and ten years later became a full-time trade union official for the Health Visitors' Association. She left in 1990 to become a regional officer for the Manufacturing, Science and Finance union, being promoted to national officer before it became part of Amicus, in which she was the national officer for the health sector.

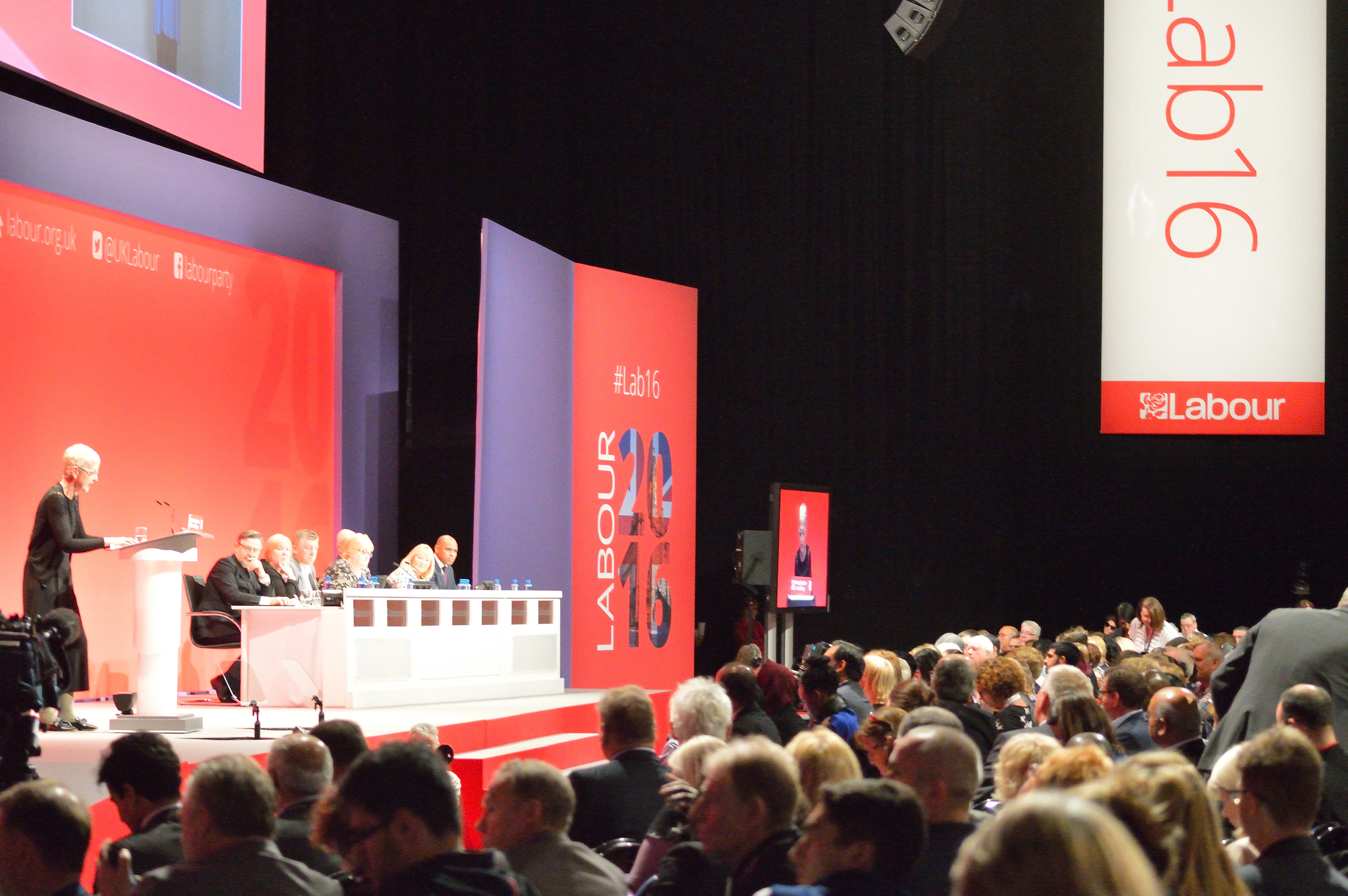
Cartmail speaking at the 2016 Labour Party Conference

In 2007, Amicus became part of Unite, and Cartmail was appointed as its assistant general secretary with responsibility for public services. She contested the 2010 election to become the union's General Secretary, taking fourth place and 39,000 votes behind Len McCluskey who was elected. In 2016, when McCluskey stood down to contest a new election, Cartmail was chosen as acting general secretary.

Cartmail is a Commissioner at the UK Commission for Employment and Skills. In her spare time, she enjoys cold-water swimming.

In 2020, Cartmail became the President of the Trades Union Congress.

Trade union offices
Preceded by Ged Nichols	President of the Trades Union Congress; 2020–2021	Succeeded by Sue Ferns
