= Amalgamated Wheelwrights, Smiths and Kindred Trades Union =

The Amalgamated Wheelwrights, Smiths and Kindred Trades Union was a trade union representing workers involved in vehicle building in the United Kingdom.

The union was founded in 1908, when the Cardiff-based Amalgamated Wheelwrights' and Carriage Makers' Union merged with the Bolton-based Wheelwrights and Smiths' Society, forming the Amalgamated Society of Wheelwrights, Smiths and Motor Body Makers. By 1911, it was based in Manchester, and had a membership of 1,897. It affiliated to the Trades Union Congress, and grew rapidly. In 1921, it adopted its final name, at which time, it claimed a membership of 11,000. Its merger into the National Union of Vehicle Builders was agreed in 1923, and completed in 1925.
