= Wilfred Beard =

British trade unionist

Wilfred Blackwell Beard OBE (18 January 1891 – 14 December 1967) was a British trade unionist.

Born in Manchester, Beard worked as a patternmaker and became active in the United Patternmakers Association, first as a local organiser, then as secretary of its Lancashire and Cheshire district. In his early life, he was also involved in amateur dramatics.

In 1912, he became a full-time union official. He was elected as general secretary of the Patternmakers in 1941, serving until his death in 1967, in which role he was known for his interest in trade union education, and his opposition to communism. He also served on the General Council of the Trades Union Congress (TUC) from 1947, and was President of the TUC in 1955/56. In addition, he chaired the TUC's Education Committee for many years, and served on a number of government commissions. He served on the Iron and Steel Board in the early 1950s, but resigned in 1953 following pressure from his union. In 1958/59, he was President of the Confederation of Shipbuilding and Engineering Unions.

Beard was made an OBE in 1948. However, it is recorded that in 1959 he declined the higher award of a CBE.

Beard stood down from the TUC General Council at its 1967 Congress, and died unexpectedly before the end of the year.

Trade union offices
Preceded by Allan Findlay	General Secretary of the United Patternmakers Association; 1941–1967	Succeeded by Samuel McLaren
Preceded by Charles Geddes	President of the Trades Union Congress; 1955–1956	Succeeded by Tom Williamson
Preceded by Harry Brotherton	President of the Confederation of Shipbuilding and Engineering Unions; 1958–1959	Succeeded by Frank Foulkes
Preceded by Jim Campbell and Tom Eccles	Trades Union Congress representative to the AFL-CIO; 1959; With: Joseph O'Hagan	Succeeded by Frank Cousins and Frederick Hayday
