= Tim Roache =

British trade unionist

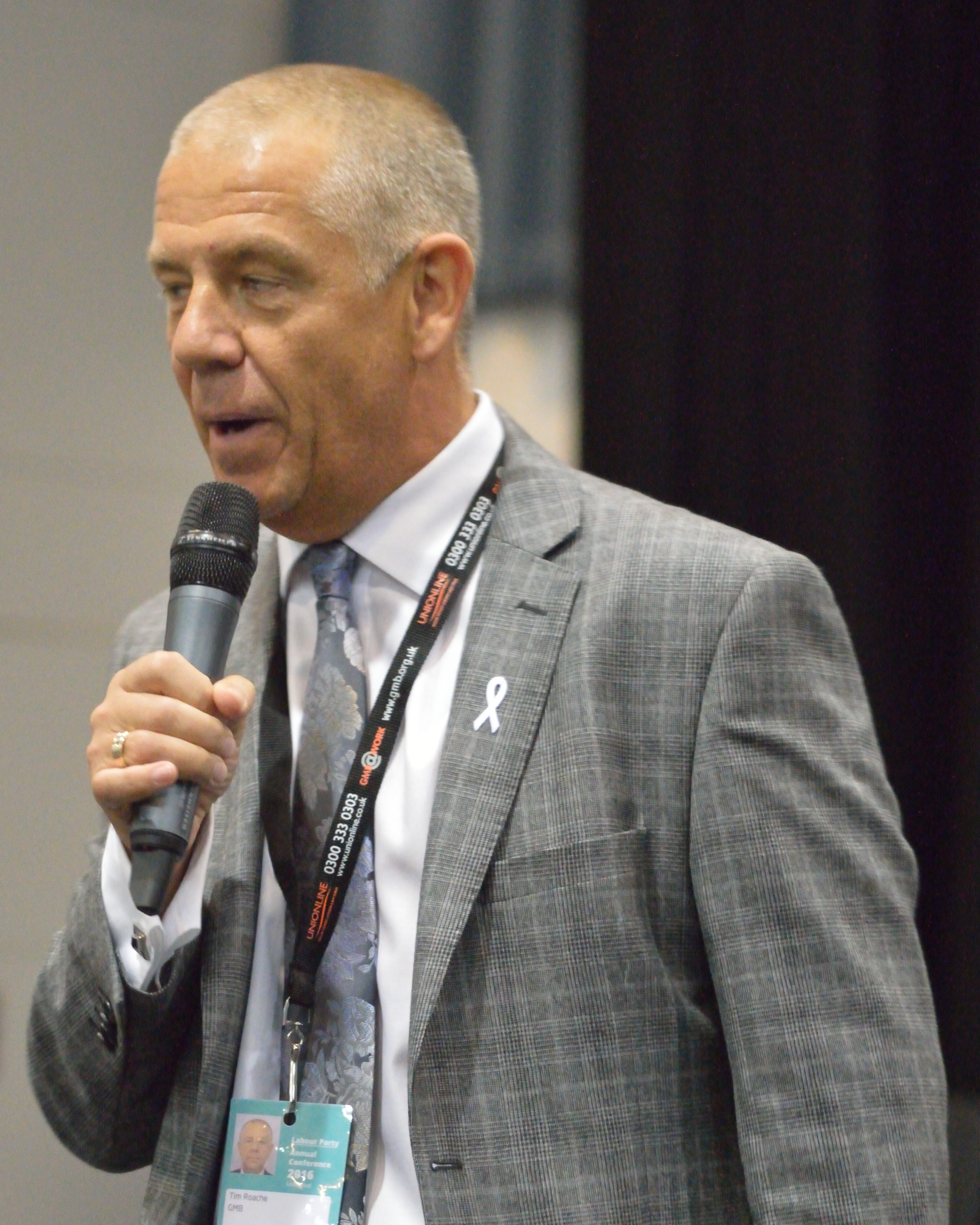
Roache speaking at the 2016 Labour Party Conference

Timothy John Roache (born 6 April 1962) is a British trade unionist who served as General Secretary of the GMB union from 2016 to 2020.

== Union career ==
Roache was born on 6 April 1962 and grew up in London, where his father was a shop steward on the docks. In 1979, he began working in the postroom of the GMB, over time being promoted to become a legal officer, then an organiser, and finally in 2007 as the union's Regional Secretary for Yorkshire and North Derbyshire.

In 2009, Roache led a 13-week strike of refuse workers and street cleaners employed by Leeds City Council; this was the longest strike in the GMB's history. He also ran the "End Foul Pay" campaign for football clubs to pay ground staff higher wages.

Roache was elected as General Secretary and Treasurer of the GMB in November 2015, receiving 56.7% of the vote on a turnout of 4.2%, beating the one other candidate, Paul McCarthy. Roache took up the post in 2016. He was re-elected in 2019 with 61% of the vote.

In April 2020 Roache resigned suddenly, on the grounds of ill health, amid reports he had been forced to resign. A GMB statement said Roache's chronic fatigue syndrome illness some years ago had restarted and he resigned following medical advice. After receiving anonymous allegations about Roache's conduct, the union conducted a barrister-led internal inquiry, which concluded that bullying, misogyny, cronyism and sexual harassment were "endemic" within the union.

== Other interests ==
Alongside his role in the GMB, Roache was the chair of the Centre for Labour and Social Studies (CLASS) and also of the Yorkshire and Humber Trades Union Congress.

Some reports suggested he was supportive of Jeremy Corbyn's leadership of the Labour Party and had criticised the 2015 Labour manifesto drawn up under Ed Miliband, though other reports state he was not an enthusiastic backer, or a critic, of Corbyn. Roache did not back the 2016 challenge to Corbyn's leadership, saying "This is about democracy and respecting the Labour Party’s democratic process. Jeremy has a strong mandate, and it’s hugely disappointing that this is not being respected".

In his spare time, Roache supports Arsenal F.C. and coaches his son's local football team, Kippax Juniors. He is also a father and a husband.

Trade union offices
Preceded by Paul Kenny	General Secretary of the GMB; 2016–2020	Succeeded by Gary Smith
