= William Tallon (trade unionist) =

British trade unionist

William Tallon (1902 – 29 November 1978) was a British trade unionist.

Tallon worked at Leyland Motors, where he joined the Amalgamated Engineering Union (AEU). He held a variety of posts in his union branch and, later, at district level, and was elected as secretary of the joint shop stewards committee at Leyland, then became a full-time regional officer for the union.

In 1952, Tallon was elected to the executive council of the AEU. Although this was the peak of his career in the union, he came to greater prominence representing the AEU at other national bodies. He served on the executive of the Confederation of Shipbuilding and Engineering Unions, and was its president in 1966/67, while in 1957, he was elected to the General Council of the TUC, holding his seat until his retirement in 1967.

Tallon also served on a variety of government committees. In 1958, he was made an Officer of the Order of the British Empire.

Trade union offices
Preceded by Alf Roberts	President of the Confederation of Shipbuilding and Engineering Unions; 1966 – 1967	Succeeded by William Carron
