= National Union of Vehicle Builders =

Former trade union of the United Kingdom

- Merged into: Transport and General Workers' Union
- Founded: 1834
- Dissolved: 1972
- Headquarters: 44 Hathersage Road, Manchester
- Location: United Kingdom
- Members: 9,186 (1907); 74,140 (1972)
- Key people: Alf Roberts (Gen Sec)
- Affiliations: TUC, ITUC, CSEU

The National Union of Vehicle Builders (NUVB) was a trade union in the United Kingdom. The NUVB represented a mixture of skilled and unskilled workers in the automotive industry.

== History ==
The union was formed in 1834 as the United Kingdom Society of Coachmakers, adopting the name National Union of Vehicle Builders in 1919. In 1920, the London and Provincial Coachmakers, the Operative Coachmakers' Federal Union, and the Coachmen and Vicesmiths' Trade Society joined the union, while the Amalgamated Wheelwrights, Smiths and Kindred Trades Union joined in 1923.

In 1934, the union had 20,439 members, divided into 150 branches. The union's increase in dues was the basis for the 1950 court case Edwards v Halliwell. It merged with the Transport and General Workers' Union (TGWU) in 1972, forming a new automotive trade group within the TGWU.

== Election results ==
The union sponsored Labour Party candidates in several Parliamentary elections.

Election	Constituency	Candidate	Votes	Percentage	Position
1918 general election	Swindon	Joseph Compton	8,393	39.9	2
1922 general election	Swindon	Joseph Compton	11,502	43.6	2
1923 general election	Manchester Gorton	Joseph Compton	16,080	60.0	1
1924 general election	Manchester Gorton	Joseph Compton	16,383	56.0	1
1929 general election	Manchester Gorton	Joseph Compton	22,056	61.1	1
1931 general election	Manchester Gorton	Joseph Compton	16,316	42.3	2
1935 general election	Manchester Gorton	Joseph Compton	20,039	55.9	1
1955 general election	Chertsey	Richard H. Edwards	14,656	38.9	2
1959 general election	Kirkcaldy Burghs	Harry Gourlay	25,428	58.3	1
1964 general election	Kirkcaldy Burghs	Harry Gourlay	24,263	60.0	1
1966 general election	Kirkcaldy Burghs	Harry Gourlay	23,273	59.6	1
1970 general election	Kirkcaldy Burghs	Harry Gourlay	22,986	56.0	1

== General Secretaries ==
1900s: W. J. Clouter
1914: James Nicholson
1935: Harry Halliwell
1953: F. S. Winchester
1962: Alf Roberts
1968: Gabrielis Gallus
1971: Granville Hawley (acting)

== See also ==
- Transport and General Workers' Union
- TGWU amalgamations
