= Robert Knight (trade unionist) =

Robert Knight (5 September 1833 – 17 September 1911) was a British trade unionist.

Born in Lifton, Devon, Knight followed his father in his trade as a blacksmith. From 1857, he worked at the Devonport Dockyard in Plymouth and became active in the United Society of Boilermakers and Iron and Steel Shipbuilders, being elected as its general secretary in 1871. Based in Liverpool, he quickly became known as an efficient administrator, and in 1875 was elected Chairman of the Parliamentary Committee of the Trades Union Congress.

Through the recession-hit 1880s, Knight became increasingly cautious. However, he became active in the Liberal Party, and led the formation of the Federation of Engineering and Shipbuilding Trades in 1890, and in 1899 he helped set up the General Federation of Trade Unions, before retiring later in the year.

Trade union offices
Preceded by John Allen	General Secretary of the United Society of Boilermakers and Iron and Steel Shipbuilders; 1871–1899	Succeeded by D. C. Cummings
Preceded by New position	Auditor of the Trades Union Congress; 1872; With: W. H. Packwood	Succeeded by Henry Broadhurst and Peter Shorrocks
Preceded by Alfred Bailey	Chairman of the Parliamentary Committee of the TUC; 1875	Succeeded by John Kane
