= United Patternmakers' Association =

Trade union

- Merged into: Amalgamated Union of Engineering Workers-Technical, Administrative and Supervisory Section
- Founded: 1872
- Dissolved: 1984
- Headquarters: 15 Cleve Road, West Hampstead
- Location: United Kingdom
- Members: 6,842 (1907); 9,571 (1980)
- Key people: George Buchanan
- Publication: Patternmaker
- Affiliations: TUC, CSEU, LMTU, Labour

The United Patternmakers Association (UPA) was a trade union in the United Kingdom.

== History ==
The association was founded in 1872 to represent skilled patternmakers in England, following a strike by patternmakers along the River Tyne and River Wear for a nine-hour day. Originally based in London, it transferred its headquarters to Manchester in 1896, to Leeds in 1903, then to Eccles in 1908, returning to London in 1912.

The Associated Patternmakers of Scotland union merged into the UPA in 1912. In 1918, the union balloted its members on joining the new Amalgamated Engineering Union, but this was not approved.

During the 1930s, George Buchanan was the union's president, and the union focussed considerable attention on anti-fascist activity. It was initially sympathetic to the Independent Labour Party's split from the Labour Party, although by 1935 Buchanan's union backing was withdrawn. It retained a strong craft unionist approach, and resisted the prevailing trend of admitting workers in allied trades.

In 1969, the union renamed itself the Association of Patternmakers and Allied Craftsmen. By 1979, its membership stood just under 10,000, mostly in the English Midlands. Only three members were women. In 1984, it merged into the Technical, Administrative and Supervisory Section.

== Election results ==
The union sponsored candidates in numerous Parliamentary elections between 1909 and 1974, most of whom were elected. Almost all ran as Labour Party candidates, the exception being Buchanan in 1931 who was refused Labour Party endorsement, and instead stood for the Independent Labour Party. He ran for that party again in 1935, on this occasion without official backing from the union, although it did set up a voluntary fund for his support, to which members could choose to donate. By 1945, he had returned to the Labour Party.

Election	Constituency	Candidate	Votes	Percentage	Position
1909 by-election	Sheffield Attercliffe	Joseph Pointer	3,531	27.5	1
1910 Jan general election	Sheffield Attercliffe	Joseph Pointer	7,755	56.1	1
1910 Dec general election	Sheffield Attercliffe	Joseph Pointer	6,532	55.0	1
1922 general election	Glasgow Gorbals	George Buchanan	16,478	54.5	1
1923 general election	Glasgow Gorbals	George Buchanan	17,211	67.2	1
1924 general election	Glasgow Gorbals	George Buchanan	19,480	65.9	1
1929 general election	Glasgow Gorbals	George Buchanan	25,134	74.8	1
1931 general election	Glasgow Gorbals	George Buchanan	19,278	58.1	1
1931 general election	Stoke	Ellis Smith	13,264	30.3	2
1935 general election	Stoke	Ellis Smith	20,992	52.7	1
1945 general election	Glasgow Gorbals	George Buchanan	21,073	80.0	1
1945 general election	Stoke	Ellis Smith	29,551	69.1	1
1950 general election	Stoke-on-Trent South	Ellis Smith	34,339	64.5	1
1951 general election	Stoke-on-Trent South	Ellis Smith	35,261	65.8	1
1955 general election	Stoke-on-Trent South	Ellis Smith	31,003	63.6	1
1959 general election	Stoke-on-Trent South	Ellis Smith	29,578	59.3	1
1964 general election	Stoke-on-Trent South	Ellis Smith	28,928	60.6	1
1974 Feb general election	Stretford	Kenneth Anthony	19,641	35.2	2

== Officials ==
=== General Secretaries ===
1872: R. C. Douglas
1872: R. Reay
1884: William Mosses
1917: Alan Findlay
1941: Wilfred Beard
1967: Samuel McLaren
1969: Gerry Eastwood

=== Presidents ===
1872: N. Charlton
1876: C. Mothersdale
1880: S. T. Taylor
1884: R. Brown
1884: T. Souter
1885: John Livingston
1888: George E. Wilson
1891: Thomas Goodall
1892: Joseph W. Field
1893: Joseph Taylor
1894: William Williams
1895: Fred W. Kent
1896: John Mills
1897: Ed Appleby
1899: J. M. Whittaker
1900: Thomas Battison
1901: J. M. Whittaker
1902: A. Mackenzie
1903: Arthur Pearson
1909: John Mills
1913: Albert E. Wardale
1932: George Buchanan
1946: Ellis Smith
1966: Victor MacDonald
1977:
