= Repiping =

Repiping means replacing the pipes in a building, oil or gas well, or centrifuge.

== See also ==
- Plumbing
