= John Willcocks =

British trade union leader (1882–1948)

John Willcocks (1882 – 12 May 1948) was a British trade union leader.

Willcocks worked in shipbuilding from an early age, and joined the Associated Shipwrights' Society. He slowly rose to prominence, and became known for his skills in negotiation, in which he was involved as early as World War I. He was on the right wing of the union, and hoped that a Labour government could eliminate inflation, thereby reducing industrial conflict. He was elected as the union's assistant general secretary in 1929, and worked closely with the union's leader, William Westwood, the two also being close friends outside work.

In 1939, Westwood was appointed as the government chief labour adviser, leaving him with insufficient time to attend to union business. Willcocks began filling the role and, given his experience, especially of wartime conditions, proved successful. He was officially made acting general secretary in 1941 and, due to the increased demand for shipbuilding during World War II, the union's membership rose from 20,000 to nearly 30,000 over the next few years.

At the end of the war, Westwood was appointed to the government, and so retired from union business, and the union's executive appointed Willcocks as the union's permanent general secretary without holding an election, a decision which was approved by a vote of the union's members. The same year, he was additionally elected as the president of the Confederation of Shipbuilding and Engineering Unions, serving for two years.

By the start of 1948, Willcocks was in poor health, and he retired at the end of March, dying just over a month later. In his spare time, he served as a magistrate in Newcastle upon Tyne.

Trade union offices
Preceded by New position	Assistant General Secretary of the Shipconstructors' and Shipwrights' Association; 1929–1942	Succeeded by Sydney Ombler
Preceded by William Westwood	General Secretary of the Shipconstructors' and Shipwrights' Association; 1945–1948	Succeeded by Sydney Ombler
Preceded by Mark Hodgson	President of the Confederation of Shipbuilding and Engineering Unions; 1945–1947	Succeeded by Mark Hodgson
