= William Westwood, 1st Baron Westwood =

British trade unionist and Labour politician

The Lord Westwood
- Born: 28 August 1880
- Died: 13 September 1953 (aged 73)
- Children: William Westwood, 2nd Baron Westwood

Coat of arms of William Westwood, 1st Baron Westwood
Crest A mullet Argent charged with a thistle slipped and leaved Proper. Escutcheon Argent a lion rampant Gules between three lymphads Sable flags flying to the dexter of the second. Supporters On either side a sea-lion Argent charged on the shoulder with two anchors in saltire Sable. Motto Deeds Not Words

William Westwood, 1st Baron Westwood OBE (28 August 1880 – 13 September 1953), was a British trade unionist and Labour politician.

Westwood was the son of William Westwood of Dundee, Scotland. He was national supervisor of the Ship Constructors' and Shipwrights' Association (now part of GMB Union) from 1913 to 1929 and its general secretary from 1929 to 1945 as well as chief industrial adviser from 1942 to 1945. He was appointed an officer of the Order of the British Empire (OBE) in 1920. On 29 January 1944 he was raised to the peerage as Baron Westwood, of Gosforth in the County of Northumberland. He then served in the Labour government of Clement Attlee as a lord-in-waiting (government whip in the House of Lords) between 1945 and 1947 and was also chairman of the Mineral Development Committee under the Ministry of Fuel and Power from 1946 to 1949.

Lord Westwood married firstly Margaret, daughter of William Young, in 1905. After her death in 1916 he married secondly Agnes Helen, daughter of James Downie, in 1918. She died in 1952. Lord Westwood survived her by a year and died in September 1953, aged 73. He was succeeded in the barony by his eldest son from his first marriage, William.

Trade union offices
Preceded by Frank Purdy	General Secretary of the Ship Constructive and Shipwrights' Association; 1929–1945	Succeeded by John Willcocks
Preceded by Will Sherwood	President of the Confederation of Shipbuilding and Engineering Unions; 1933–1939	Succeeded by John W. Stephenson
Peerage of the United Kingdom
New creation	Baron Westwood; 1944–1953	Succeeded by William Westwood
