= John Edmonds (trade unionist) =

British trade union official

John Edmonds (born 28 January 1944) is a British former trade union official.

Edmonds grew up in South London, and was educated at Christ's Hospital School and Oriel College, Oxford. On graduation, he found work as a research assistant with the National Union of General and Municipal Workers, moving on to become a field officer, then a National Industrial Officer.

In 1986, Edmonds became General Secretary of the union, by then known as the GMB. In this role, he became known as a critic of Tony Blair's leadership of the Labour Party. He stood down as leader in 2003, one year ahead of schedule. In retirement, he has remained active in the Labour Party in south and west London.

Trade union offices
Preceded by Ken Baker	National Industrial Officer of the National Union of General and Municipal Workers; 1971 – 1986	Succeeded by Pat Turner
Preceded by David Basnett	General Secretary of the GMB; 1986–2003	Succeeded by Kevin Curran
Preceded by Tony Dubbins	President of the Trades Union Congress; 1998	Succeeded by Hector MacKenzie
