= Confederation of Shipbuilding and Engineering Unions =

UK trade union confederation founded 1890

CSEU
- Confederation of Shipbuilding and Engineering Unions
- Founded: 1890
- Headquarters: Salamanca Place, London SE1, England
- Location: United Kingdom
- Members: 4 unions
- General Secretary: Ian Waddell
- Website: cseu.org.uk

The Confederation of Shipbuilding and Engineering Unions (CSEU), often known as the Confed is a trade union confederation in the United Kingdom.

== History ==
The confederation was founded in December 1890 as the Federation of Engineering and Shipbuilding Trades by small craft unions, on the initiative of Robert Knight of the United Society of Boilermakers and Iron and Steel Shipbuilders, primarily in response to the formation of a National Federation of Shipbuilders and Engineers by employers. By 1895, sixteen unions were affiliated, with a total membership of 150,000. However, the prominent Amalgamated Society of Engineers (ASE) refused to join. The ASE finally joined in 1905 but, failing to persuade the other members to unite with it in a single industrial union, withdrew again in 1914. Meanwhile, unions representing unskilled workers were initially excluded; the National Amalgamated Union of Labour was finally admitted in 1908, and the National Union of Gasworkers and General Labourers in 1910, and only after they had given assurances that they would permit the craft unions to retain a leading role in the organisation. Because it would not sign a similar agreement, the Workers' Union was never admitted. In its early years, the Federation focussed on resolving demarcation disputes, but it soon concentrated on making national agreements for the engineering and shipbuilding industries, allowing the largest union in each trade to take the lead in negotiations.

The confederation adopted its current form and name in 1936. From 1941, the CSEU co-operated with the National Union of Foundry Workers and the Amalgamated Engineering Union in the National Engineering Joint Trades Movement, convincing these two unions to affiliate in 1944 and 1946 respectively. The confederation then represented the vast majority of unionised workers in the relevant industries.

By 1977, the CSEU had 23 affiliates and 2.4 million members, with most workers organised in the relevant sections of the Transport and General Workers Union, General and Municipal Workers Union and Electrical, Electronic, Telecommunications and Plumbing Union. Members in 1979 were:

- Amalgamated Society of Boilermakers, Shipwrights, Blacksmiths and Structural Workers
- Amalgamated Union of Engineering Workers (all four sections held separate memberships)
- Associated Metalworkers' Union
- Association of Patternmakers and Allied Craftsmen
- Association of Professional, Executive, Clerical and Computer Staff
- Association of Scientific, Technical and Managerial Staffs
- Electrical, Electronic, Telecommunications and Plumbing Union
- Furniture, Timber and Allied Trades Union
- General and Municipal Workers' Union
- National Society of Metal Mechanics
- National Union of Domestic Appliance and General Metal Workers
- National Union of Scalemakers
- National Union of Sheet Metal Workers, Coppersmiths, Heating and Domestic Engineers
- Screw, Nut, Bolt and Rivet Trade Union
- Transport and General Workers' Union (Power & Engineering and Automotive Trade Groups)
- Union of Construction, Allied Trades and Technicians

In 1989, membership was still 22 affiliates and 2 million members but, by 2001, this had fallen to 1.2 million members, and a process of union mergers has greatly reduced the number of affiliated unions and the prominence of the organisation. All current affiliates are also members of the Trades Union Congress.

By 2017 the union had no direct members and was functioning as a federation of the Unite, GMB, Community, Prospect and UCATT trade unions. Since the merger of UCATT into Unite the number of member unions has fallen to four.

== Current members ==
- Community
- GMB
- Prospect
- Unite the Union

== General Secretaries ==
1890: William Mosses
1917: Frank Smith
1937: Ernest Gilbert
1942: Gavin Martin
1957: George Barratt
1970: Jack Service
1978: Alex Ferry
1994: Alan Robson
2004: John Wall
2008: Dave Gibbs
2009: Hugh Scullion
2017: Ian Waddell

== Presidents ==
From	Until	President	Union
1897	c.1900	Robert Knight	USB
1900	1912	James Millar Jack	AIMS
1912	1922	John Hill	USB
1923	1925	Allan Findlay	UPA
1925	1933	Will Sherwood	NUGMW
1933	1939	William Westwood	SCSA
1939	1941	John W. Stephenson	PGDEU
1941	1943	Harry N. Harrison	NUGMW
1943	1945	Mark Hodgson	USB
1945	1947	John Willcocks	SSA
1947	1948	Mark Hodgson	USB
1948	1958	Harry Brotherton	NUSMW
1958	1959	Wilfred Beard	UPA
1959	1960	Frank Foulkes	ETU
1960	1961	Jim Matthews	NUGMW
1961	1962	Harold Poole	NUSMWC
1962	1963	George Doughty	DATA
1963	1964	John McFarlane Boyd	AEU
1964	1965	Ted Hill	ASB
1965	1966	Alf Roberts	NUVB
1966	1967	William Tallon	AEU
1967	1968	William Carron	AEF
1968	1969	Leonard Green	NUSMWCH&DE
1969	1970	Percy Hanley	AEF
1970	1971	Jack Youngs	ASW
1971	1972	Frank Briggs	NSMM
1972	1973	Jack Higham	NUDAGO
1973	1974	Fred McGuffie	EETPU
1974	1975	Charles Stewart	FTAT
1975	1976	Les Buck	NUSMWCH&DE
1976	1977	Len Edmondson	AUEW
1977	1978	Marie Patterson	TGWU
1978	1979	Hugh Scanlon	AUEW
1979	1980	Ken Baker	GMWU
1980	1981	Roy Grantham	APEX
1981	1982	Gerry Eastwood	APAC
1982	1983	Pat Turner	GMB
1983	1984	Granville Hawley	TGWU
1984	1985	Robert McCusker	ASTMS
1985	1986	Tom Crispin	TGWU
1986	1987	Gavin Laird	AEU
1987	1988	Todd Sullivan	TGWU
1988	1989	Ken Gill	MSF
1989	1990	Jack Whyman	AEEU
1990	1991	John Weakley	AEEU
1991	1992	Charlie Kelly	UCATT
1992	1993	Bill Jordan	AEEU
1993	1995		
1995	1997	Barbara Switzer	MSF
1997	1999	Tony McCarthy	NUDAGO
1999	2001	Roger Lyons	MSF
2001	2003	John Rowse	TGWU
2003	2005	Diana Holland	TGWU
2005	2007	Doug Collins	Amicus
2007	2009	John Quigley	Unite
2009	2011	Keith Hazelwood	GMB
2011	2019	Ian Tonks	Unite
2019	2022	Tony Burke	Unite
2022	Present	Bob King	Prospect
