= William Westwood, 2nd Baron Westwood =

British peer

The Lord Westwood
- Born: 25 December 1907
- Died: 8 November 1991 (aged 83)
- Known for: Former chairman of Newcastle United

William Westwood, 2nd Baron Westwood (25 December 1907 – 8 November 1991) was a British peer, director of Hornby Railways and former chairman of Newcastle United.

== Biography ==
Westwood inherited his father's title and estate, on his father's death in 1953. After losing one of his eyes in a car accident in 1956, he always wore an eye patch.

Westwood became a director of Newcastle United in 1960 and became chairman in 1963. He was chairman when the team won the 1969 Inter-Cities Fairs Cup. He became president of the Football League in 1974, went on to be vice-chairman of the Football Association and also served on the UEFA professional committee. He had a sharp wit and was a regular after dinner speaker.

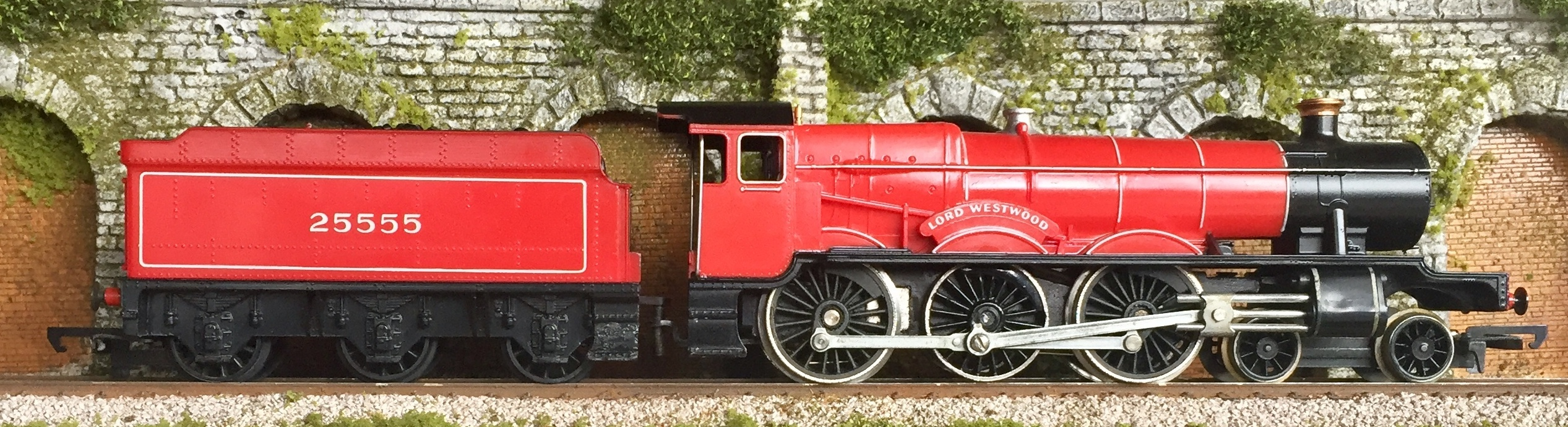
The Lord Westwood from Hornby in OO gauge.

Hornby Railways released a model Hall Class Locomotive in 1973 called Lord Westwood.

In 1977, six leading players threatened resign from the club. Having claimed that both he and the team manager, Richard Dinnis, had been "knifed in the back", Westwood stopped all staff from talking to the press. After a string of defeats, culminating in a loss to Arsenal at St James Park, fans called for his resignation with shouts of Westwood out. There was fighting in the streets and there were 10 arrests. He stood down as chairman in January 1978.

In 1981, each director of Newcastle United were asked to put up a £16,000 guarantee in favour of the bank to help the club's financial position. Westwood had lost money in the collapse of DCM, Europe's leading toy company, of which he was also chairman; he refused to provide the guarantee and resigned from the board completely.

Westwood died on 8 November 1991.

Coat of arms of William Westwood, 2nd Baron Westwood
| Crest A mullet Argent charged with a thistle slipped and leaved Proper. Escutcheon Argent a lion rampant Gules between three lymphads Sable flags flying to the dexter of the second. Supporters On either side a sea-lion Argent charged on the shoulder with two anchors in saltire Sable. Motto Deeds Not Words |

Peerage of the United Kingdom
| Preceded by William Westwood | Baron Westwood; 1953–1991 | Succeeded by William Gavin Westwood |
