= James Conley (trade unionist) =

British trade unionist

James Conley (29 May 1850 – c.1922) was a British trade unionist.

Born in Tow Law in County Durham, Conley became an apprentice boilermaker when he was seventeen. He completed this successfully in 1872, when he moved to South Shields to find work, and joined the United Society of Boilermakers. Immediately active in his branch, he was elected secretary within six months, and was then chosen as the union's first district auditor.

In 1881, Conley stood to become assistant general secretary of the Boilermakers, but was not elected. However, he was elected to the union's executive council, and served as a branch secretary, moving to Partick in Scotland in 1887. While there, he greatly increased union membership and was presented with gold valued at £100 in thanks by the union. He was unsuccessful in his attempt to be elected as general secretary of the Boilermakers, but was elected to Partick Town Council.

Conley stood for the Labour Representation Committee in Liverpool Kirkdale at the 1906 general election, but narrowly missed out on election, taking 45.7% of the vote.

Conley retired in 1916, and died aged 72.
