= National Association of Colliery Overmen, Deputies and Shotfirers =

British association, former trade union

NACODS
- National Association of Colliery Overmen, Deputies and Shotfirers
- Founded: 1910
- Headquarters: Barnsley, England
- Location: United Kingdom
- Members: 402 (2014)
- Key people: Rowland Soar, general secretary
- Website: www.nacods.org.uk

The National Association of Colliery Overmen, Deputies and Shotfirers (NACODS) is an association of former colliery deputies and under-officials in the coal industry. It was once the trade union for such workers, until the end of coal mining in the United Kingdom in 2016.

== History ==
NACODS was established as a national trade union in 1910. Before that, the union existed as a federation of autonomous areas which were collectively known as the General Federation of Firemen's, Examiners' and Deputies Associations of Great Britain. The present title of NACODS was adopted in 1947 when the coal industry was nationalised.

In 2016, the final three coal mines in the United Kingdom were closed. Following this, the union no longer had any working members, and it therefore decided to deregister as a trade union, and disaffiliate from the TUC, STUC and GFTU. It continued in existence as an unincorporated association with former workers in the industry holding honorary memberships.

== Strikes ==
NACODS was much less willing to take industrial action than the NUM although many had voted for strike action when NUM members, which sometimes led to tension amongst workers in the mines. Militants in the NUM nicknamed NACODS the "National Association of Can-carriers, Obedient Dopes and Suckers". There were some confrontations during the 1972 strike, but nothing compared to what came in the 1984-85 strike.

In April 1984, a small majority of NACODS voted to strike in support of the NUM, but this fell short of the two-thirds majority that their constitution required for a national strike. The National Coal Board had decided in the 1972 strike that a NACODS member was entitled to stay off work without any loss of pay if he faced violence or aggressive intimidation from NUM pickets. When the number of NUM strikebreakers increased in August, Merrick Spanton, the NCB personnel director, stated that he expected NACODS members to cross the picket lines to supervise their work. As this would have meant crossing aggressive (and sometimes violent) lines, it brought another ballot for a national strike from NACODS. For the first time in their history, NACODS voted to strike in September 1984 by a vote of 81%. However, a deal negotiated by North Yorkshire NCB Director Michael Eaton persuaded NACODS leaders to call off the strike action in return to changes to the review procedures for threatened collieries. Ian MacGregor later admitted that if NACODS had gone ahead with a strike, a compromise would probably have been forced on the Coal Board. Files later made public showed that the Government had an informant inside the TUC, passing information about negotiations.

== General Secretaries ==
1910: Edward Williams
1914: William Frowen
1939: W. T. Miller
1943: J. W. Sumnall
1947: Bartholomew Walsh
1960: Joseph Crawford
1973: Arthur E. Simpson
1980s: Peter McNestry
1990s: Bleddyn Hancock
2003: Ian Parker
2015: Rowland Soar
