= Accord (trade union) =

British trade union

- Accord
- Founded: 1978; 48 years ago
- Headquarters: Charvil, Berkshire, England
- Members: ▲21,451 (2024)
- General Secretary: Ged Nichols
- Affiliations: TUC; STUC; A4F
- Website: accord-myunion.org

Accord is an independent trade union, affiliated to the TUC and the Scottish TUC and specialized for around 25,000 staff in financial services, including members in the Lloyds Banking Group, MBNA, TSB, The Equitable Life Assurance Society and Sainsbury's Bank.

== History ==
Accord can trace its origins back to 1978, when it was founded as the Halifax Building Society Staff Association (HBSSA). The HBSSA was founded by John Simmons, the then manager of the Halifax branch in Plymouth. He had concluded that staff within the Halifax Building Society were in need of trade union representation, and had begun organising in earnest in 1977. Simmons was keen to avoid the use of the word "union" because of the negative connotations associated with militant trade unions in the UK in the 1970s. Accord's headquarters, Simmons House, is named after John Simmons.

In 1978 Ernie Roberts was appointed as the first General Secretary. Branch reps were elected and Regional Committees established. From these groups a National Committee was elected, which met for the first time in August 1978. The HBSSA was formed. By the end of 1978 the HBSSA was recognised by the then Halifax Building Society "as the sole bargaining agent for its members below Executive and Regional Manager level".

In January 1979 the HBSSA was granted its Certificate of Independence. This meant that it was recognised by the Government as a bona fide trades union and was afforded the rights to which it was entitled. In 1980 the HBSSA held its first conference in Manchester. In 1983 Ernie Roberts retired, allowing David Nash to become the second General Secretary. Bill Wright was appointed Assistant General Secretary.

At the 1994 Conference delegates voted to rename the HBSSA the Independent Union of Halifax Staff (IUHS). In 1995 the Halifax Building Society merged with the Leeds Permanent Building Society. The following year the Leeds Staff Association joined the IUHS. Also in 1996, The Halifax acquired the Clerical Medical Investment Group and in 1999 announced its merger with the Bank of Scotland. The union was therefore renamed again by delegates at the 2002 conference to reflect the diversity of its membership. From this point onwards it was known as Accord.

== General secretaries ==
1978: Ernie Roberts
1983: David Nash
1992: Ged Nichols
