= National Board of Boiler and Pressure Vessel Inspectors =

The National Board of Boiler and Pressure Vessel Inspectors (NBBI) is composed of chief boiler and pressure vessel inspectors representing states, cities, and provinces enforcing pressure equipment laws and regulations. These laws and regulations represent the collective input of National Board members.

== History ==
The ASME developed its boiler code in 1915. The code provided a solid reference of construction standards, but ASME lacked the authority to regulate. This was further complicated by the existence of local and state jurisdictions with their own codes and standards. This resulted in a patchwork of confusion having no basis in consistency.

On December 2, 1919, Ohio Chief Inspector Carl Myers met with chief inspectors from other jurisdictions to discuss creation of a board of inspector representatives from each of the existing jurisdictions, commencing the genesis of The National Board of Boiler and Pressure Vessel Inspectors.

== National Board Training ==
The National Board trains hundreds of boiler and pressure equipment professionals from around the world every year. National Board training facilities are located on a 16-acre (65,000 m^{2}) wooded campus in Columbus, Ohio.

== National Board Registration ==
Pressure-retaining items can be registered with the National Board, requiring certain uniform quality standards be achieved certifying the manufacturing, testing, and inspection process. To obtain a certification the registered items have to be inspected by National Board-commissioned inspectors and built to required standards. The purpose of National Board registration is to promote safety and document specific equipment design and construction details for future use. It takes place when the manufacturer submits data reports to the National Board for items stamped with National Board numbers.

Among the information included in the data report are: date of manufacture, materials of construction, specific details regarding design, and certification statements by both the manufacturer and inspector. Registration is required by most US jurisdictions for installation of pressure equipment. Registered pressure relief devices are stamped with a National Board NB Mark. For the manufacturer, data reports provide a form of customer service over the life of the equipment. Since 1921 there have been over 45 million data reports registered with the National Board.

== National Board Pressure Relief Department and Testing Laboratory ==
Each year, representatives from around the world travel to the National Board Testing Laboratory north of Columbus, Ohio to measure the performance of their company’s pressure relieving devices.

Tested products undergo independent certification of function and capacity. A pressure relief device meeting new construction standards and specifications permits the manufacturer to apply the National Board NB mark to new equipment. Capacity certification signifies equipment designs have been thoroughly reviewed. Additionally, it indicates the quality system has been audited and the equipment meets internationally recognized standards for preventing potential overpressure conditions in boilers and pressure vessels.

Testing is also performed to evaluate a company’s ability to properly repair pressure relief valves. Accredited repair organizations qualify to stamp the National Board VR symbol on repair nameplates.

The National Board lab supports industry research and development by testing new designs, serving as a comparative standard for other laboratories, validating new concepts, and – upon jurisdiction request – assist in boiler and pressure vessel incident investigations.
