= John Hill (trade unionist) =

British trade union leader

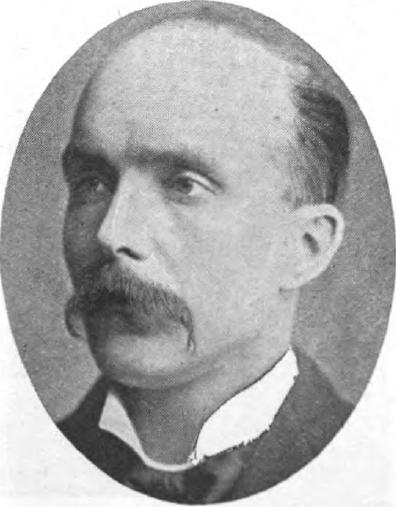
Hill in the mid 1900s

John Hill (30 July 1863 – 16 January 1945) was a British trade union leader.

Born in Govan, he worked in the Glasgow shipyards from the age of twelve, later taking an apprenticeship as a plater. He became active in the United Society of Boilermakers and Iron and Steel Shipbuilders, being its Clyde delegate from 1901 to 1909, while also serving on his parish council for the Independent Labour Party. The union sponsored his candidacy in Glasgow Govan at the 1906 general election; he took 29% of the vote, but was not elected. He stood for the Labour Party, again unsuccessfully, in the 1907 Liverpool Kirkdale by-election.

In 1909, Hill was elected General Secretary of the Boilermakers. He was able to strengthen the union in his first five years by focussing on craft unionism and controlling apprenticeships. During World War I, he articulated some of the concerns of Red Clydeside on the national stage, working to get the Munitions of War Act amended, and becoming increasingly important in the Labour Party. In 1917, he served as President of the Trades Union Congress.

Hill remained General Secretary until 1936, but struggled to maintain the union's bargaining power in the face of the Great Depression.

Trade union offices
Preceded by D. C. Cummings	General Secretary of the United Society of Boilermakers and Iron and Steel Shipbuilders; 1909–1936	Succeeded by Mark Hodgson
Preceded by New position	Shipbuilding Group representative on the General Council of the TUC; 1921 – 1936	Succeeded by Mark Hodgson
Preceded by Harry Gosling and William Whitefield	Trades Union Congress representative to the American Federation of Labour; 1917; With: Arthur Hayday	Succeeded by Margaret Bondfield and Frederick Hall
Preceded by Harry Gosling	President of the Trades Union Congress; 1917	Succeeded by J. W. Ogden
