= Amalgamated Society of Boilermakers, Shipwrights, Blacksmiths and Structural Workers =

Former trade union of the United Kingdom

Boilermakers' Society
- Amalgamated Society of Boilermakers, Shipwrights, Blacksmiths and Structural Workers
- Merged with: National Union of General and Municipal Workers
- Founded: 20 August 1834
- Dissolved: 1982
- Headquarters: Lifton House, Eslington Road, Newcastle upon Tyne
- Location: United Kingdom
- Members: 52,776 (1907); 129,712 (1980)
- Publication: Monthly Report to Members
- Affiliations: TUC, CSEU, LMTU, Labour

The Amalgamated Society of Boilermakers, Shipwrights, Blacksmiths and Structural Workers (ASB) was a trade union in the United Kingdom. Many of its members worked in shipbuilding, in which industry it was the leading trade union, while over time it also developed strength in engineering and construction.

== History ==
The union was founded in 1834 in Manchester as the Society of Friendly Boilermakers. It initially had fourteen members, which quickly grew and but soon established a branch in Bolton, and in 1835 the Manchester branch formed a general council, which governed the whole union, led by secretary William Hughes. It quickly began a national expansion, with a branch in Bristol established in 1836, and one in London in 1839, and its first Irish branch in Belfast in 1841. Initially, these branches operated almost entirely independently, but from 1842, under new secretary John Roberts, it began introducing national controls on spending and reserves, and ran an annual delegate meeting.

In 1845, the union was renamed as the United Friendly Boiler Makers' Society. Its growth enabled it to employ Roberts on a full-time basis, and although he left the country unannounced in 1848, he was replaced by John Pennie. He kept the union independent, refusing to join the new Amalgamated Society of Engineers (ASE), and in 1852 persuaded both the Scottish Society of Boilermakers and the recently formed, London-based Amicable and Provident Society of Journeymen Boilermakers of Great Britain to amalgamate. As many of the members of these unions, while using boilermaking techniques, were involved in building and repairing ships, the union was renamed as the United Society of Boilermakers and Iron and Steel Shipbuilders. Pennie soon decided to emigrate to the United States, and was briefly replaced by George Brogden then, after his death, by John Allen.

In 1858, there was high unemployment in the industry, and the union ran up considerable debts, but Allen removed unemployment benefits, enabling it to survive, and then grow, membership reaching 3,453 by the end of the year. By 1864, it was able to employ full-time organisers, known as lecturers, the first being William Swan. A successful strike of members at dockyards on the Tyne, in support of higher wages, led to further recruitment. However, wages were widely cut in 1864 and 1865. Industrial action against these had mixed results, and a turn to a campaign for a Nine Hour Day ended in failure. Swan had recently recruited many union members on the Clyde, and the union's refusal to pay them strike benefit led to many leaving the union, Swan forming a rival National Association of Operative Boiler Makers and Iron and Ship Builders, although this soon petered out.

The treasurer of the union's Bradford branch stole £25 in 1865, and the union took him to court, but despite taking the case all the way to the Court of the Queen's Bench, it was found that union funds had no legal protection. This came as a surprise to the trade union movement, which had previously believed that its funds were covered by the Friendly Societies Act 1855. This, coupled with concerns about the rights of striking members and those who were locked-out, led it to join the United Kingdom Alliance of Organised Trades. This confederation achieved little, but the Boilermakers retained its interest in such an organisation, and so in 1870 it joined the recently formed Trades Union Congress (TUC). Robert Knight, who became secretary of the union in 1871, soon became a leading figure in the TUC.

Under Knight's leadership, the administration of the union was greatly improved, and a nine-hour working day was finally achieved. Membership reached 9,000 by the end of the year, with a branch in Constantinople; branches in South Africa were later established. A recession starting in 1874 led to wage reductions, and persuaded the union to work with the ASE, Friendly Society of Ironfounders and Steam Engine Makers' Society to plan a federation, although this produced no immediate results. However, the 1880s saw an improvement, with membership reaching 30,000 by 1883. The union began admitting holders-up into membership, and in 1890 opened new headquarters at Lifton House in Newcastle. That year, the Federation of Engineering and Shipbuilding Trades was established, with Knight as its first chair. In 1893, it achieved a national agreement on apprenticeships in boilermaking and shipyards.

Criticisms of Knight's leadership mounted during the 1890s, as he was seen as increasingly conservative, opposed to socialism and trade unions of unskilled workers. Upset by the increasing role of general and industrial unions at the TUC, he won a vote to disaffiliate in 1894, but it reaffiliated the following year. However, unhappiness about this led the union to approve a rule revision conference every five years, and a full-time executive council was instituted in 1897. During this period, the union was also involved in the Allen v Flood case, with damages initially awarded against Allen, the chair of its executive council after it was found that he had induced the Glengall Company not to employ two non-union members. However, on appeal in the House of Lords, the decision was reversed, it being decided that it was up to workers to decide who they were willing to work alongside.

Knight retired in 1899, and although F. A. Fox led a first ballot for his replacement, he then withdrew to become secretary of the South Wales Federation of Ship-repairers. Instead, D. C. Cummings narrowly beat J. Connolly from Scotland. Cummings led the union into membership of the Labour Representation Committee, and at the 1906 UK general election, it sponsored James Conley as a candidate, and also paid half the expenses of member John Hill. Neither was elected, but Hill succeeded as general secretary in 1909.

In 1952, the union renamed itself as the United Society of Boilermakers, Shipbuilders and Structural Workers, then in 1963 it merged with the Associated Blacksmiths, Forge and Smithy Workers' Society and the Shipconstructors and Shipwrights' Association, adopting its final name.

In 1977, the union agreed a merger with the General and Municipal Workers' Union (GMWU), but this was voted down at its annual conference. Despite this, faced with a declining membership due to the reduction in jobs in shipbuilding, the union merged into the GMWU in 1982, which renamed itself as the General, Municipal, Boilermakers and Allied Trades Union.

== Election results ==
The union sponsored Labour Party candidates in numerous Parliamentary elections.

Election	Constituency	Candidate	Votes	Percentage	Position
1906 general election	Glasgow Govan	John Hill	4,212	29.0	3
1906 general election	Liverpool Kirkdale	James Conley	3,157	45.7	2
1907 by-election	Liverpool Kirkdale	John Hill	3,330	45.4	2
1918 general election	Birkenhead West	William Henry Egan	5,671	31.0	2
1918 general election	Jarrow	John Hill	8,034	39.0	2
1918 general election	Wednesbury	Alfred Short	11,341	49.8	1
1922 general election	Ayr Burghs	John McDiarmid Airlie	6,533	26.0	3
1922 general election	Birkenhead West	William Henry Egan	10,371	46.0	2
1922 general election	Middlesbrough East	Martin Henry Connolly	7,607	33.4	2
1922 general election	Stroud	Samuel Edward Walters	5,081	17.6	3
1922 general election	Wednesbury	Alfred Short	16,087	50.2	1
1923 general election	Ayr Burghs	John McDiarmid Airlie	7,732	31.7	2
1923 general election	Birkenhead West	William Henry Egan	12,473	55.8	1
1923 general election	Bristol Central	Samuel Edward Walters	11,932	45.3	2
1923 general election	Middlesbrough East	Martin Henry Connolly	7,712	33.9	2
1923 general election	Wednesbury	Alfred Short	17,810	51.5	1
1924 by-election	Liverpool West Toxteth	Joseph Gibbins	15,505	27.0	3
1924 by-election	Glasgow Kelvingrove	Aitken Ferguson	11,167	39.8	2
1924 general election	Ayr Burghs	John McDiarmid Airlie	9,787	37.7	2
1924 general election	Birkenhead West	William Henry Egan	12,723	49.4	2
1924 general election	Newcastle upon Tyne East	Martin Henry Connolly	13,120	46.4	1
1924 general election	Wednesbury	Alfred Short	18,170	50.5	1
1929 general election	Birkenhead West	William Henry Egan	16,634	47.5	1
1929 general election	Liverpool West Toxteth	Joseph Gibbins	19,988	55.1	1
1929 general election	Montrose Burghs	Thomas Irwin	9,381	44.5	2
1929 general election	Newcastle-upon-Tyne East	Martin Henry Connolly	16,921	48.7	2
1929 general election	Swansea East	David Williams	16,665	56.5	1
1929 general election	Wednesbury	Alfred Short	22,420	50.1	1
1931 general election	Birkenhead West	William Henry Egan	12,682	36.2	2
1931 general election	Greenock	Thomas Irwin	10,850	30.7	2
1931 general election	Swansea East	David Williams	17,126	56.5	1
1931 general election	Wednesbury	Alfred Short	20,842	45.5	2
1935 general election	Greenock	Thomas Irwin	16,945	44.0	2
1935 general election	Swansea East	David Williams	unopposed	N/A	1
1979 general election	Manchester Ardwick	Gerald Kaufman	17,235	56.7	1
1979 general election	North Lanarkshire	John Smith	25,015	55.5	1

== General Secretaries ==
1835: William Hughes
1842: John Roberts
1849: John Pennie
1853: George Brogden
1857: John Allen
1871: Robert Knight
1900: D. C. Cummings
1909: John Hill
1936: Mark Hodgson
1948: Ted Hill
1965: Danny McGarvey
1967: John Chalmers
1980: Jim Murray
