= Shipconstructors' and Shipwrights' Association =

Former trade union of the United Kingdom

- Merged into: United Society of Boilermakers, Shipbuilders and Structural Workers
- Founded: 1882
- Dissolved: 1963
- Headquarters: 8 Eldon Square, Newcastle upon Tyne
- Location: United Kingdom
- Members: 19,350 (1907)
- Affiliations: TUC, CSEU, Labour

The Shipconstructors' and Shipwrights' Association (SSA) was a trade union representing shipbuilders in the United Kingdom.

== History ==
The union was founded in 1882 as the Associated Society of Shipwrights, by eleven local unions in Scotland and North East England. Seven further unions in Scotland and North West England quickly joined the new association. The union changed its name to the Associated Shipwrights' Society, and gradually other unions around the UK affiliated.

In 1908, the union merged with the Ship Constructive Association and the Amalgamated Society of Drillers and Hole Cutters, and renamed itself as the Ship Constructive and Shipwrights' Association, later changing this to the "Shipconstructors' and Shipwrights' Association". At the beginning of 1963, it merged with the United Society of Boilermakers, Shipbuilders and Structural Workers.

== Election results ==
The union sponsored Labour Party candidates in several Parliamentary elections.

Election	Constituency	Candidate	Votes	Percentage	Position
1906 general election	Chatham	John Hagan Jenkins	6,692	62.5	1
1906 general election	Dundee	Alexander Wilkie	6,833	23.3	2
1910 Jan general election	Chatham	John Hagan Jenkins	6,130	45.3	2
1910 Jan general election	Dundee	Alexander Wilkie	10,365	32.9	2
1910 Dec general election	Dundee	Alexander Wilkie	8,957	29.3	2
1918 general election	Dundee	Alexander Wilkie	24,822	36.1	2
1918 general election	Gillingham	William Tapp	4,705	25.9	2
1922 general election	Perth	William Westwood	4,651	18.9	3

== General Secretaries ==
1882: Alexander Wilkie
1928: Frank Purdy (acting)
1929: William Westwood
1945: John Willcocks
1948: Sydney Ombler
1958: Arthur Williams
