= ATP =

ATP may refer to:

== Science, technology and biology ==
- Adenosine triphosphate, an organic chemical used for driving biological processes
  - ATPase, any enzyme that makes use of adenosine triphosphate
- Advanced Technology Program, US government program
- Alberta Taciuk process, for extracting oil from shale, etc.
- Anti-tachycardia pacing, process similar to a pacemaker
- Assistive Technology Practitioner - Rehabilitation Engineering and Assistive Technology Society of North America (RESNA)
- AT Protocol, an open communications protocol intended for decentralized social networking services
- Automated theorem proving, method of proving mathematical theorems by computer programs

== Companies and organizations ==
- Association of Tennis Professionals, men's professional tennis governing body
  - ATP Tour
- American Technical Publishers, employee-owned publishing company
- Armenia Tree Project, non-profit organization
- Association for Transpersonal Psychology
- ATP architects engineers, architecture- and engineering office for integrated design
- ATP Oil and Gas, defunct US energy company

== Entertainment, arts and media ==
- All Tomorrow's Parties (festival), UK organisation
  - ATP Recordings, record label
- Alberta Theatre Projects, professional, not-for-profit, Canadian theatre company
- Associated Talking Pictures, former name of Ealing Studios, a television and film production company

== Transport ==
- British Aerospace ATP, airliner
- Airline transport pilot license
- ATP Flight School, US
- ATP (treaty), UN treaty that establishes standards for the international transport of perishable food
- Aitape Airport, Papua New Guinea, IATA code
- Anti-trespass panels, meant to deter pedestrians from walking on or adjacent to train tracks
- Automatic train protection, system installed in trains to prevent collisions through driver error
  - Automatic Train Protection (United Kingdom), method of beacon based railway cab signalling

== Economics ==
- Available-to-promise, responding to customer order enquiries
- Arbejdsmarkedets Tillægspension, a Danish pension
- Allmän tilläggspension, a Swedish pension

== Other uses ==
- Around-the-post, a term used in the game of pickleball
- Sniper Advanced Targeting Pod, created by Lockheed Martin
