= James Bray Griffith =

American business theorist

James Bray Griffith (1871 – January 1, 1937) was an American business theorist, and head of Department of Commerce, Accountancy, and Business Administration at the American School of Correspondence in Chicago, known as early systematizer of management.

== Biography ==
Born in Maryland to Thomas Francis Griffith and Euphemia Hill, Griffith came into prominence in the 1900s. Early 1900s had joined the International Accountants' Society, Inc., a home study school founded in 1903 in Chicago. There he was director of the Course in Systematizing, and published his first book on systematizing in 1905. Earlier in the 1900s he had published a series of articles in The Life Insurance Independent and American Journal of Life Insurance, and in McGraw Hill's The Magazine of Business.

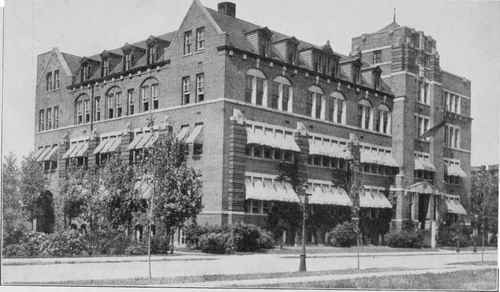
Head office of American School of Correspondence, 1912

Later in the 1900s Griffith joined the American School of Correspondence, a distance education high school founded in 1897. For the Department of Commerce, Accountancy, and Business Administration Griffith wrote a series of instruction papers, among others on Advertising & Sales Organization (1909), Purchasing and stores department (1909), Records of labor and manufacturing orders (1909), Theory of Accounts (1914). Griffith was head of the Department of Commerce, Accountancy, and Business Administration until the late 1910s.

In 1910 Griffith was Managing Editor of the Cyclopedia of Commerce, Accountancy, Business Administration, a general reference work on accounting, auditing, bookkeeping, commercial law, business management, administrative and industrial organization, banking, advertising, selling, office and factory records, cost keeping, systematizing, etc.

== Work ==
=== Systematizing, 1905 ===
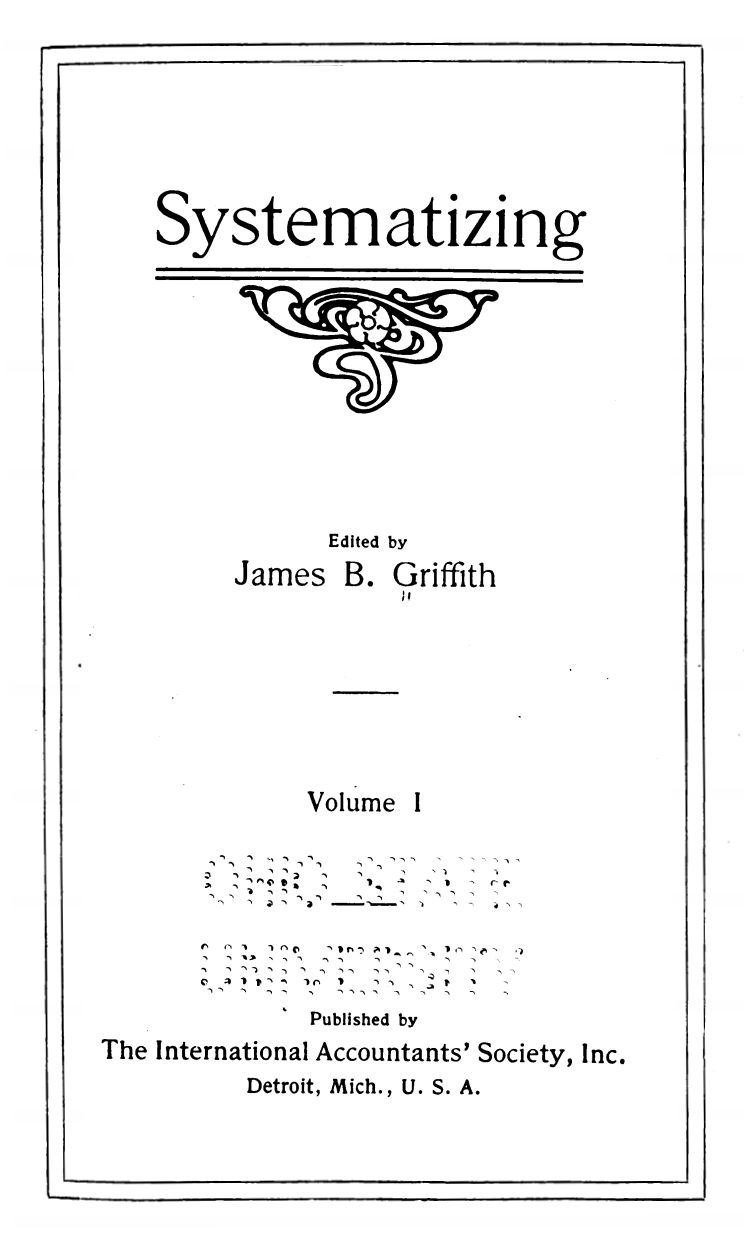
Systematizing, 1905

In the 1905 Griffith published his first work, entitled Systematizing. A 1907 review explained, that the demand for trained systematizers – men who have learned the science of business organization – is far greater that the supply. Such men experience no difficulty in securing lucrative positions, while those who engage in the work professionally soon attract as many clients as they can successfully serve.

Furthermore, the review claimed that systematizing can be learned by means of the course in systematizing under personal direction of J.B. Griffith, who with the assistance of some experts, perfected the only practical plan of teaching systematizing and business organization offered by any institution. No other educational organization is prepared to offer such thorough instruction in the subjects embraced in this course. Like other business subjects, the only practical way to learn systematizing is by actual practice — actually systematizing a business – and that explains the success of the course.

=== The system concept ===
In the 1905 Systematizing Griffith (1905) opened with stating that, before we can intelligently take up the study of system, we must first consider what the term means. According to Griffith, the term system as applied to business is:

- the plan under which the work of the entire business is carried on;
- the plan for conducting each department and for taking care of every detail;
- the method of recording the various transactions of the business and collecting information in such form that as will most clearly exhibit the condition of any department.

Griffith continued that, the key note of system is economy. A perfect system handles the details in a given department with the least possible labor. It unites the plan for handling these details into a harmonious whole for the quick and economical conduct of that particular department. The systems for conducting the various departments must in turn be united into a plan for the operation of the entire concern.

The result, according to Griffith, is a thoroughly systematized business—a complete machine—in which every department is operated and each detail handled without friction and with the smallest possible expenditure if time labour and expense.

=== Graphic illustration of the organization ===
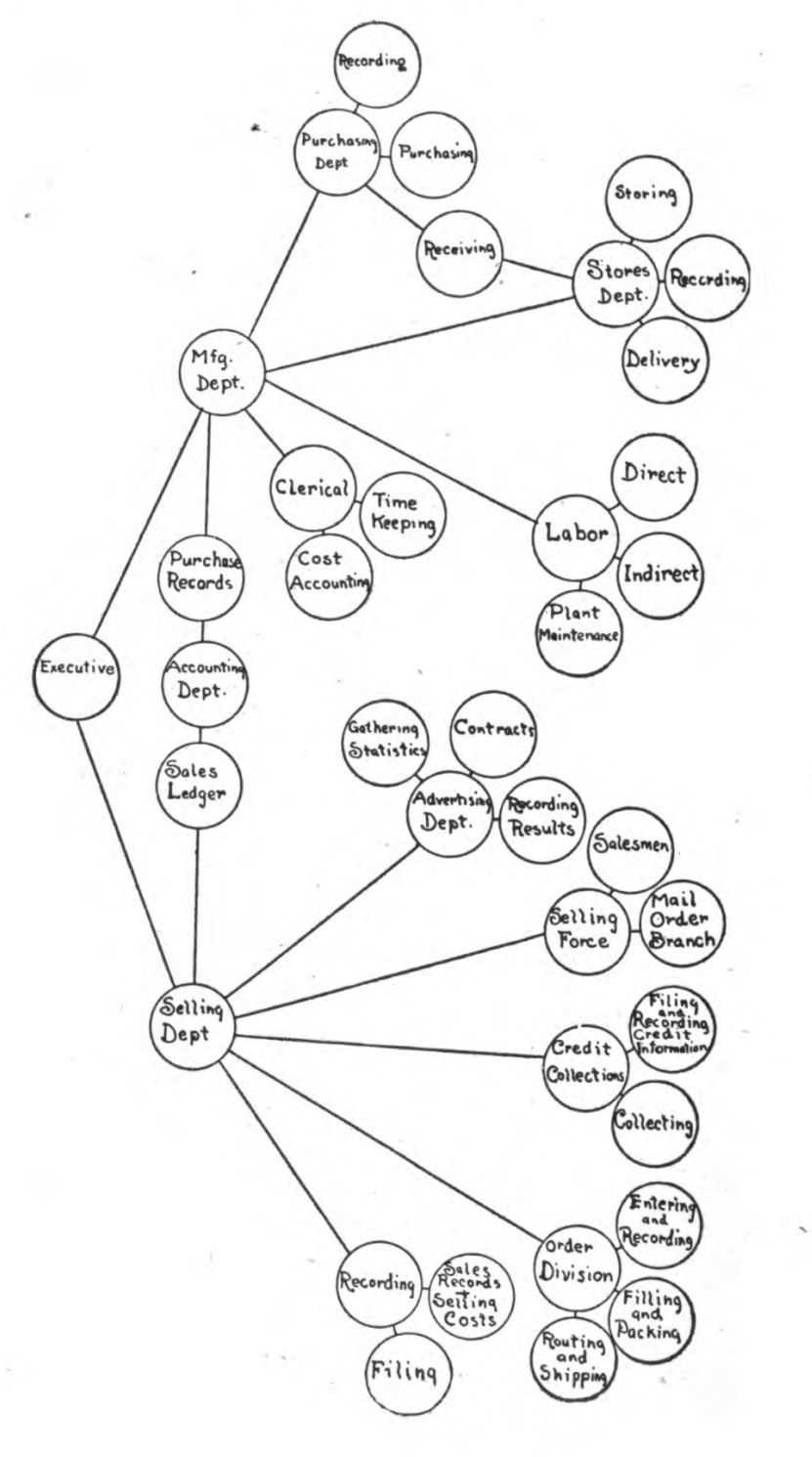
Chart of Organization

A really systematic organization, according to Griffith (1905), is one in which all of the departments work in harmony; in which every person in the establishment for the Executive head down, conforms to and performs his part of the work according to the system laid down. As applied to business concerns, the idea is best illustrated by a chart. Griffith explained:

At the center of the organization is the executive with whom communication is established by those subordinates from whom he received reports and to whom he issues orders. From them the lines of communication lead directly to those in charge of the various departments under them and then on down to every employe. While the illustration applies to a given class of concerns, this chart will give a very clear idea of how any business can be organized. If it be a jobbing business, the manufacturing departments would be omitted from the chart. In laying out the chart of any given concern it is necessary to carefully study every existing condition and the requirements of the business. Make the chart fit the business instead of trying to fit the business to a chart designed for some other concern.

At the end of the first chapter a chart is presented of a business organization (see image), which has similarities with both an organizational chart and mind map. The charts building blocks mention both business function (executive), departments (Mfg. Dept.; Selling Dept.; Accounting Dept.; etc.), records (Purchase Records; Sales Ledger; etc.), business activities (Time Keeping; Cost Accounting; etc.), and cost accounting classes (Labour Direct; Labour Indirect; etc.). In a similar way organization departments had been pictured by Griffith, such as the Purchasing Department, Stock Department and Advertising Department (see below).

Charts of organization departments, 1905

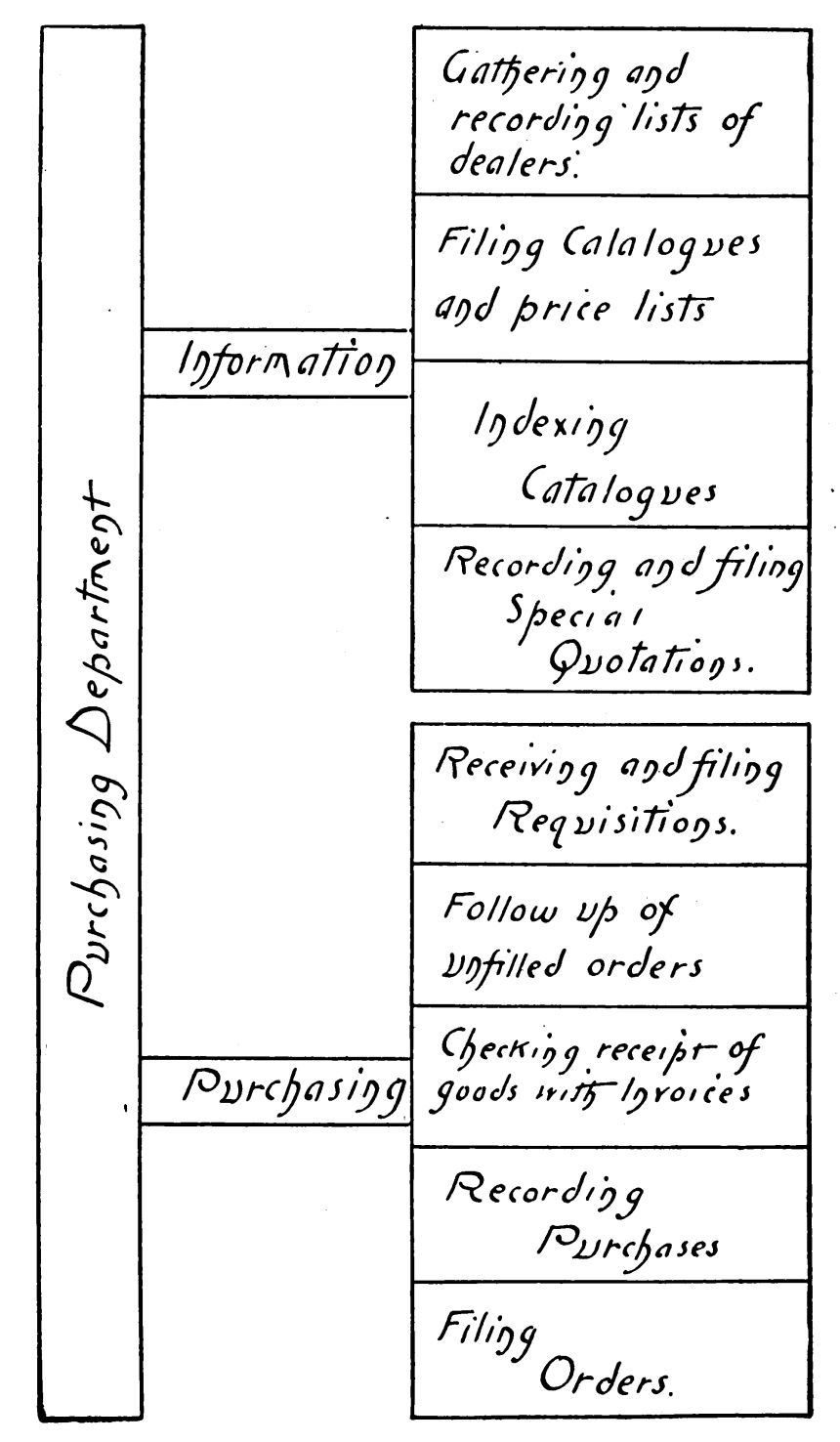
Chart of Purchasing Department, 1905

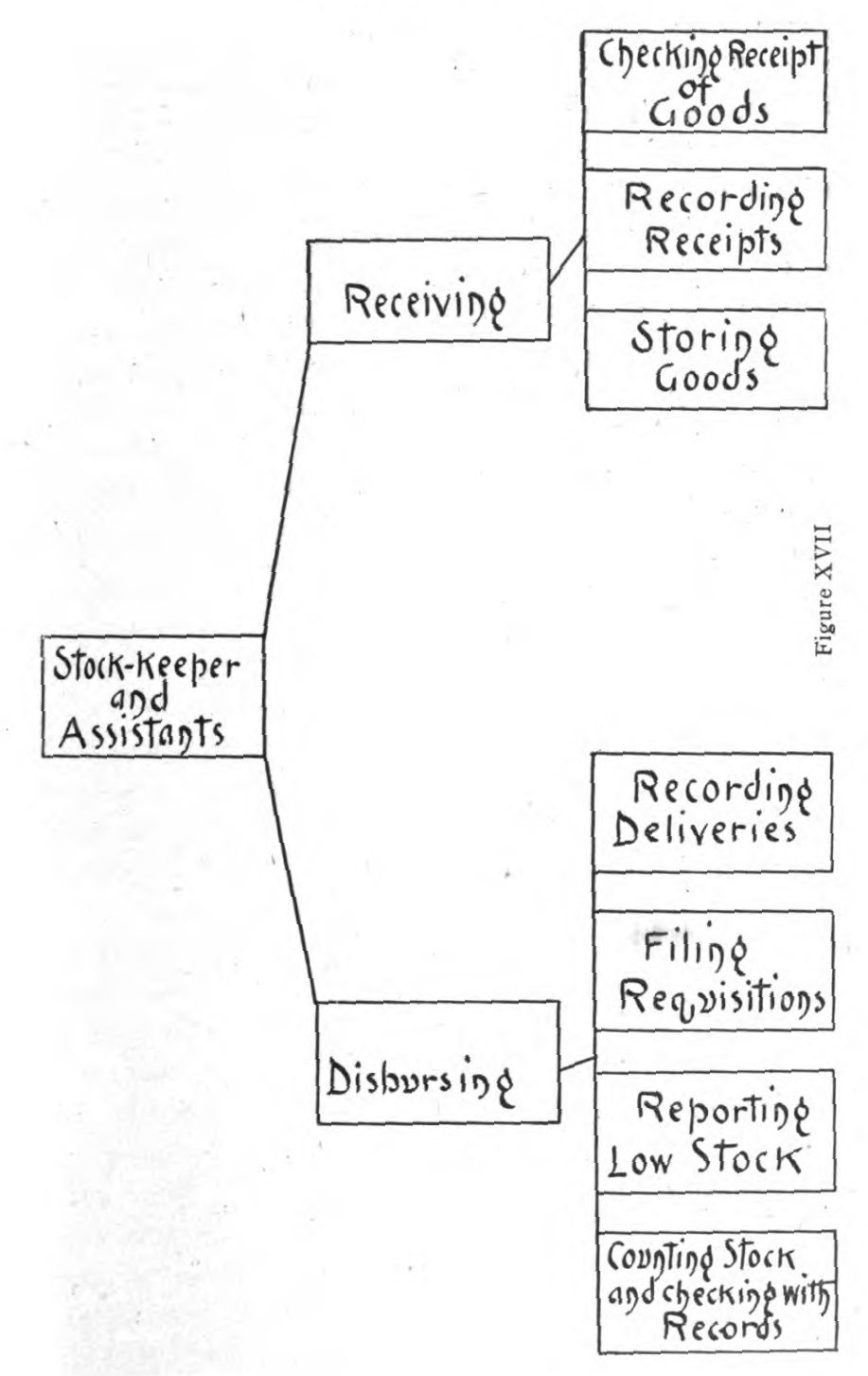
Chart of Stock Department, 1905

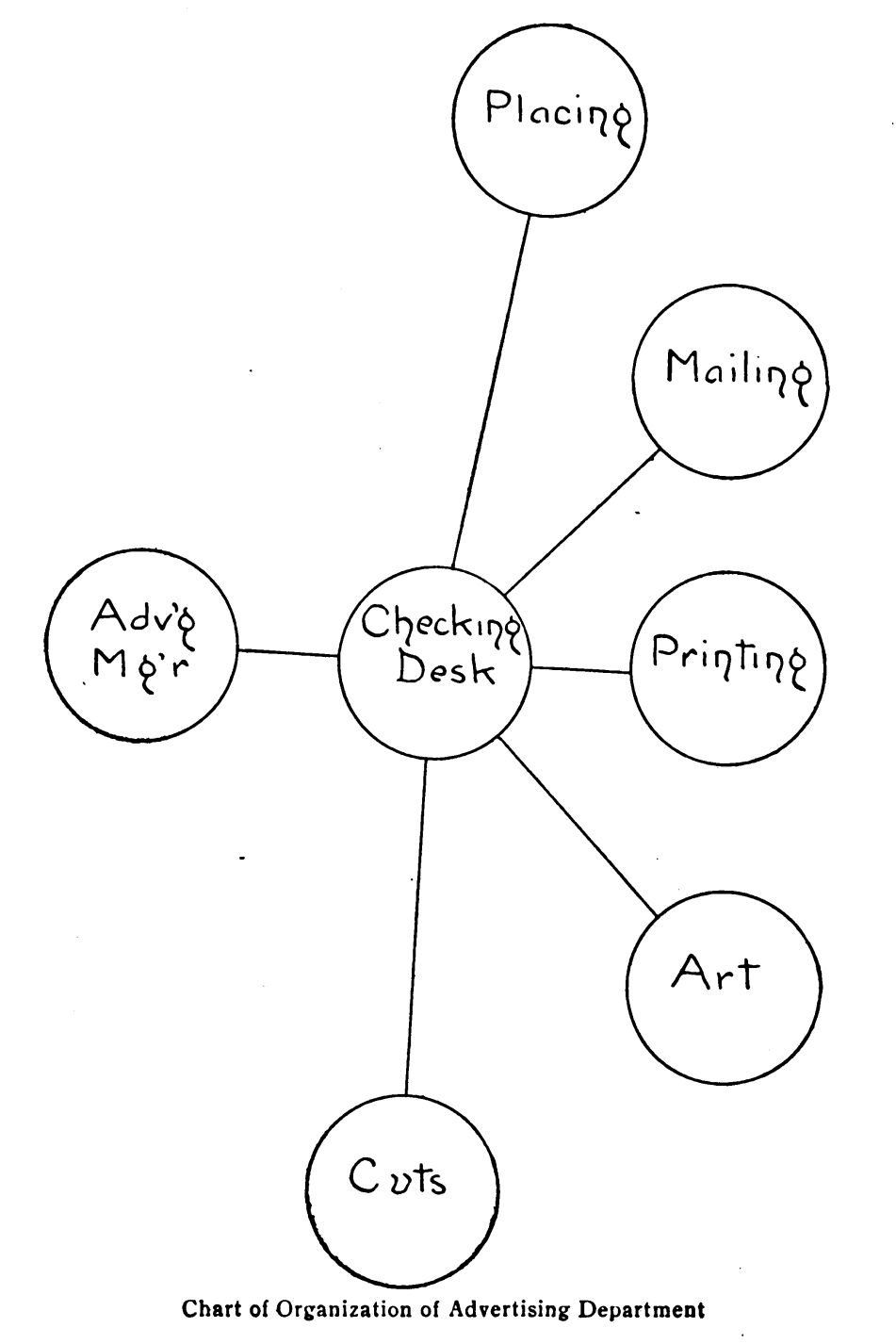
Chart of Advertising Department, 1905

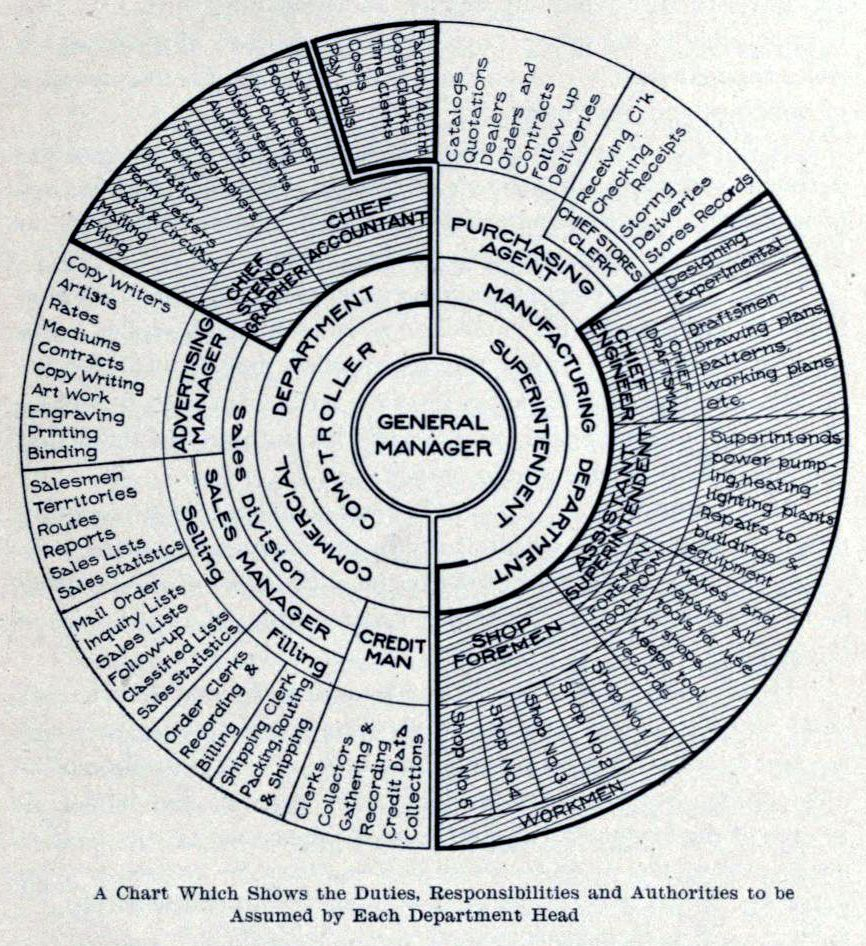
Chart of Duties, Responsibilities and Authorities of Department Heads, 1909

The presentation of these kind of preliminary organizational charts was rather rare in those days. The work itself has similarities with the series of system charts, Horace Lucian Arnold had published two years earlier in his 1903 The Factory manager and accountant.

It is remarkable, that these diagrams were also not republished in Griffith's later works. Griffith did develop the concept into a single chart of the Duties, Responsibilities and Authorities of Department Heads (see image), which was first published in Griffith's Administrative and industrial organization (1909), and republished in the 1910 Cyclopedia of Commerce, Accountancy, Business Administration,

Despite these efforts to introduce these visual aids, they didn't become that popular yet. In the 1920s a survey revealed that organizational charts were still not common among ordinary business concerns, but they were beginning to find their way into administrative and business enterprises.

=== Charting factory layout and routing ===
Another feature Griffith demonstrated in his work Systematizing and later works is the charting of factory layout and routing. In Systematizing he gave one example in the third section about "The Stock Department", where as example he illustrated two arrangements, or routing diagrams, for handling lumber:

Arrangement for handling lumber, 1905

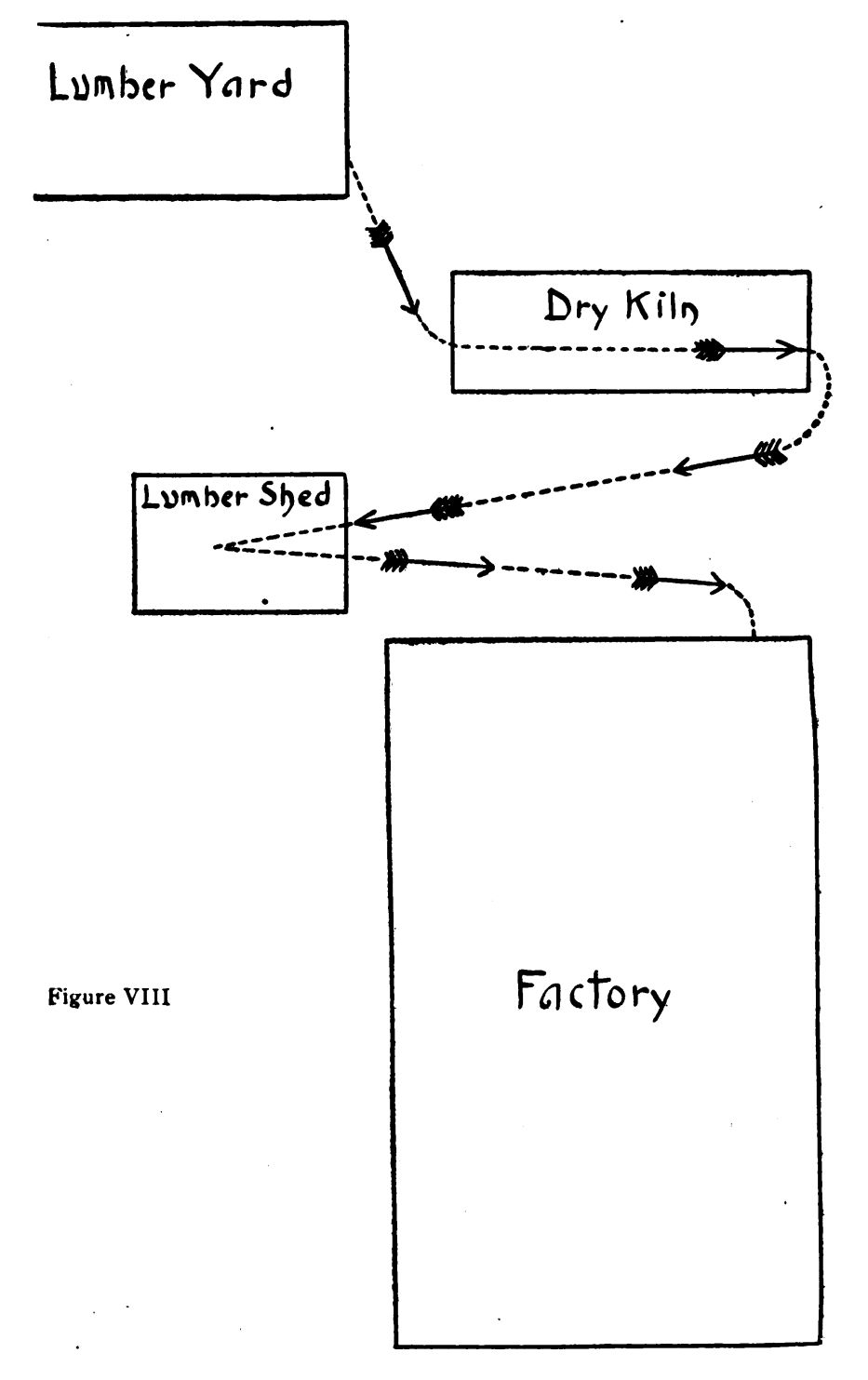
I: Arrangement for handling lumber

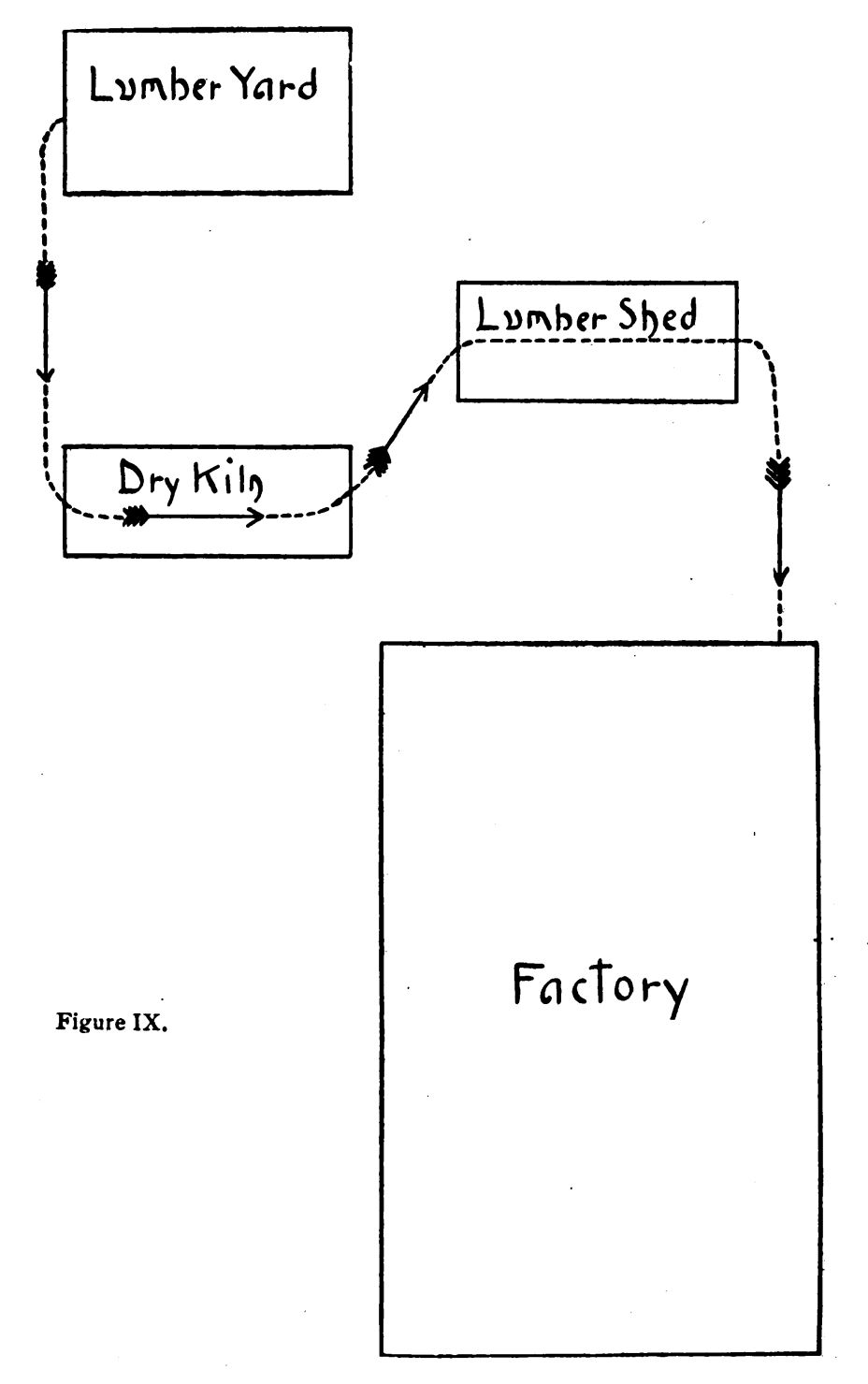
II: Arrangement for handling lumber

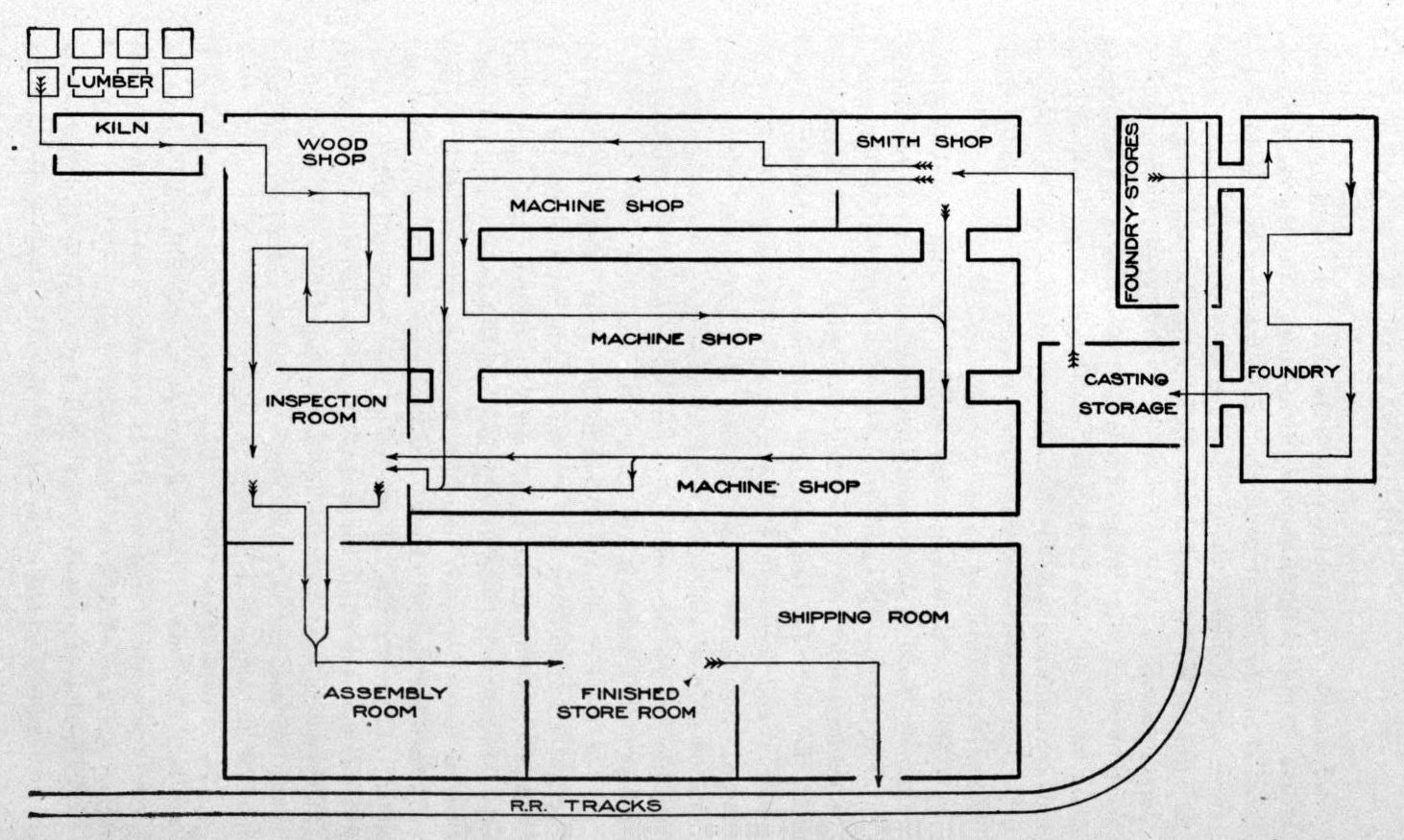
III: Layout and Routing of a Typical Manufacturing Plant, 1909

Griffith explained, that the arrangement of the stock should be such that all unnecessary handling will be avoided. The references in Section Whether it be the store house of a country store or the supply room of an immense factory, the stock most often required should be placed where it can be readily removed, while that seldom called for may be stored in the more inaccessible corners. Where the concern is large enough to require several storage places, these storage places for the different classes of stock should be located with special reference to the departments in which the stock is used.

Suppose the location of lumber yard, dry kiln, lumber shed and factory to be such as shown in Fig. I. Note How the lumber must travel back and forth, crossing the same space three times. Compare this with the arrangement shown in Fig. II.The lumber is taken the shortest possible distance and never goes over the same ground twice. Where buildings have been permanently located it may not be possible to change the general plan, but improvements can be made in nearly all cases. Take the plan in Fig. I: If the lumber yard was located immediately back of the dry kiln, at least 25 per cent of the labor of handling the lumber would be saved. The plans which we have shown illustrate examples of good and bad system in the location of one class of stock.

The layout and routing of a typical manufacturing plant are often more complex, see for example figure III, but the principles remain the same.

=== Documenting Policies and Procedures ===
In Systematizing Griffith showed to be a proponent of documenting policies and procedures. He argued:

As to the form that an order should take, the only satisfactory form is the written order ... If the request is in writing neither [the sender nor the recipient] is obliged to depend on his memory. The written order removes all chance of dispute as to its conditions, neither can there be a question of the authority of an order which bears the signature of the head of a department ... Another great advantage of the written order is that the head of a department may keep copies and follow-up each order to see that it is properly executed.

Yates (1988) commented that "the written order, whether to an individual or to the whole company, became part of organizational memory rather than just individual memory. It was then available for whatever future needs might arise."

=== Manufacturing Costs ===
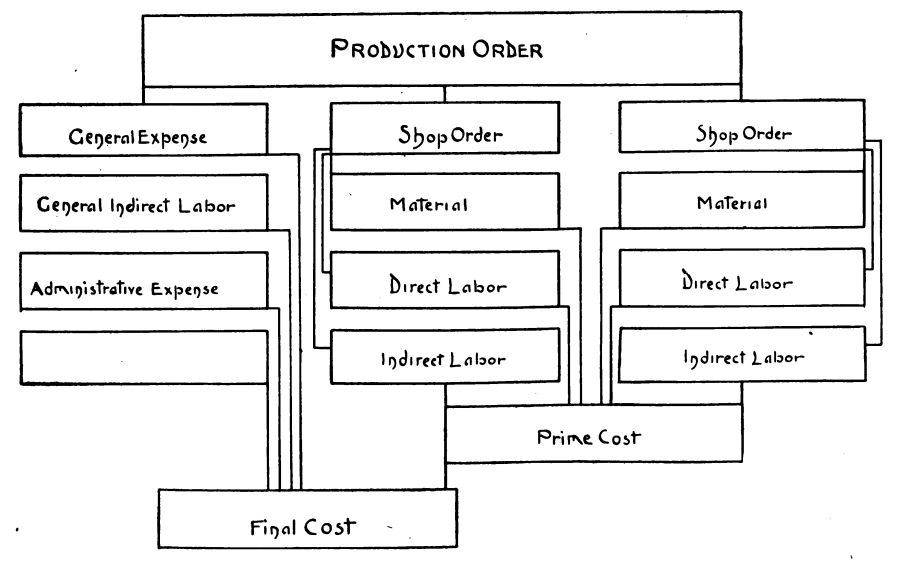
Chart of Manufacturing Costs, 1905

The tenth section of Systematizing focussed on manufacturing costs. Griffith started explaining that a cost system in any manufacturing plant is a necessity, yet in those days there were many manufacturers who hadn't discovered its importance. With cost systems Griffith meant a system by means of which the actual costs of manufacturing the product can be accurately determined.

At the end of the chapter Griffith present a chart of manufacturing cost (see image). This chart is a graphic illustration of the items which enter into the cost of manufacture, the manner in which these items are obtained and, finally, brought together in a permanent form. Griffith commented, that "a study of this chart will enable the student to outline a general plan for a cost system suited to the needs of his particular factory. When the general principles of the cost finding system are understood, it becomes merely a matter of detail to apply those principles to individual factories."

=== Accountancy and business management, 1909/1921 ===
In 1909 Griffith edited his first book series, entitled "Accountancy and business management." This book series was published in seven volumes and was prepared by a corps of auditors, accountants, attorneys, and specialists in business methods and management, and illustrated with over fifteen hundred engravings. The second edition was published 1921 by the American Technical Society in Chicago.

The table of contents of "Accountancy and business management" was:

I. Organization, sales, credits, billing, shipping.
II. Bookkeeping, accounting, partnerships, manufacturing, voucher records.
III. Purchasing, labor records, cost finding, mail order, special forms.
IV. Auditing, combinations, corporations, profits, practice.
V. Contracts, agency, sales, bills, notes, evidence.
VI. Correspondence filing, office devices, department stores.
VII. Income tax problems, commercial arithmetic, index.

Griffith had written several section such as the first chapter on "business organization and control", in 1909 also published under the title "Administrative and industrial organization." Another chapter by Griffith, entitled "the voucher system and accounting charts", was in 1917 republished as "Corporation Accounts and Voucher System."

Griffith also wrote the section on "Purchasing and stores" co-authored with W. J. Graham, and the section on "Credits." A significant part of the co-authors and collaborators also participated in the 1910 "Cyclopedia of Commerce, Accountancy, Business Administration." Furthermore, also a significant part of the content, and almost all illustrations were used in that 1910 business encyclopedia.

=== Segregation of authority ===
In the article "business organization and control" in Accountancy and business management, (1909) Griffith argued, that the segregation of authority is a universal principles of organization. This purpose of segregation of authority is to simplify, as Charles Edward Knoeppel (1908) had argued:

While business as it is now conducted is not as simple as it was in the barter days, it must not be inferred that this segregation of authority is synonymous with complexity, for its very purpose has been to simplify, and that is what it has accomplished. It is only where this segregation has been the result of lack of thought and proper attention, or other like causes, that we find a complex and unsatisfactory condition of affairs. In fact, there is all about us sufficient evidence that many commercial enterprises are being conducted along lines that, as far as evolutional development is concerned, are several stages behind the times.

Griffith in the Cyclopedia of Commerce, Accountancy, Business Administration (1910) commented, that "when we go into all of the ramifications of business we find many establishments where minor variations of our plan of organization appear necessary, but in the final analysis, the fundamentals prove to be the same." The working authorities in a manufacturing Business and in a trading Business follow a same scheme (see images).

Segregation of authority, 1908/10

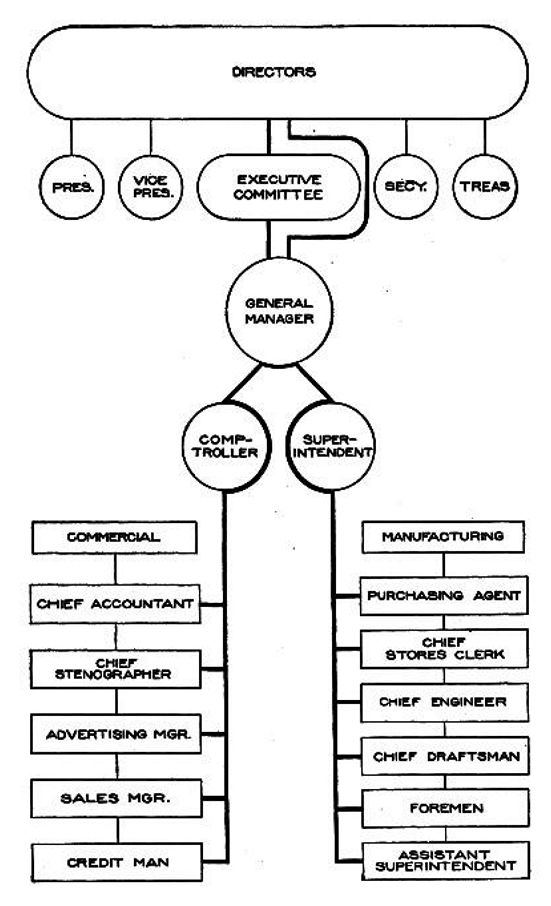
Working Authorities in a Manufacturing Business

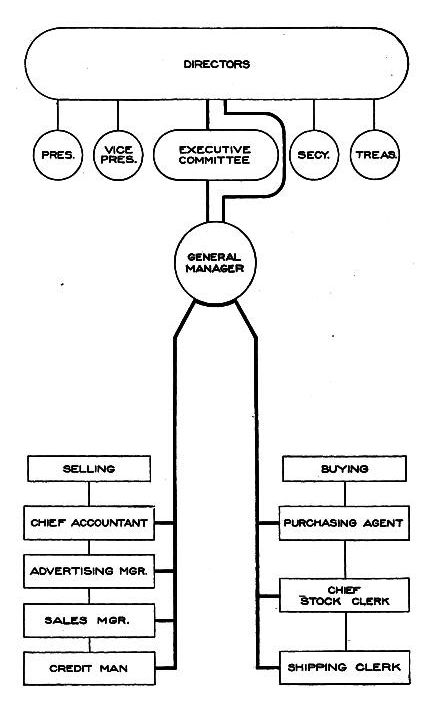
Working Authorities in a Trading Business

=== Cyclopedia of Commerce, Accountancy, Business Administration, 1910 ===
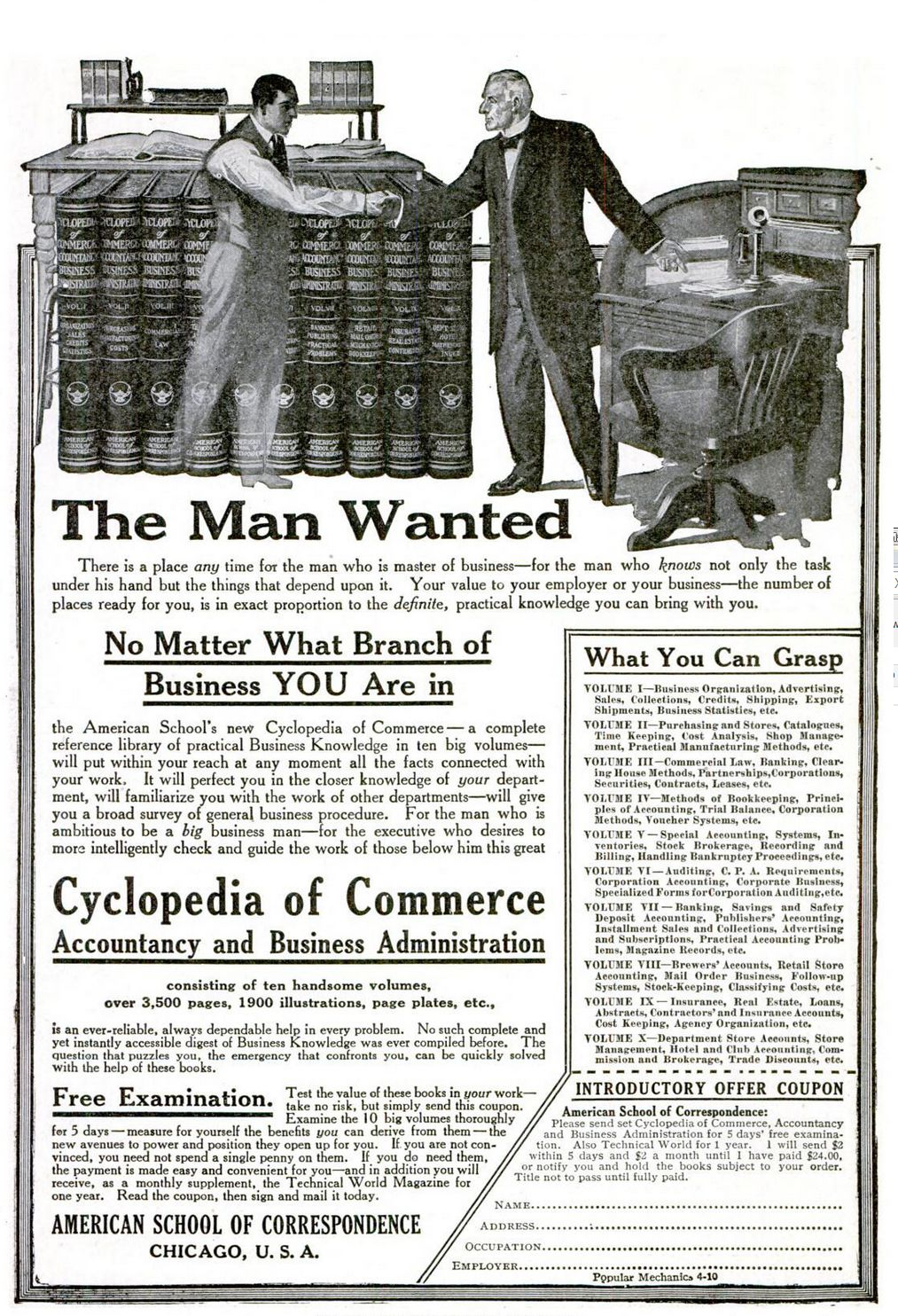
Cyclopedia of Commerce, 1910

In 1910 the American School of Correspondence published the Cyclopedia of Commerce, Accountancy, Business Administration, and Griffith had been managing editor. Other authors and collaborators of this work were Robert Hiester Montgomery, Arthur Lowes Dickinson, William M. Lybrand of Coopers & Lybrand, Oscar E. Perrigo and Halbert Powers Gillette. Among the authorities consulted were Horace Lucian Arnold, Charles Buxton Going, Lawrence R. Dicksee, Francis W. Pixley, Charles U. Carpenter, Charles Edward Knoeppel, Harrington Emerson, Clinton Edgar Woods, Charles Ezra Sprague and Charles Waldo Haskins.

A 1913 review in the Journal of Political Economy, commented that this treatise evidently aims to give a complete review of the entire field of accounting. The volumes start out with a discussion of the theory of accounts, and then proceed to show the methods of keeping the books of various kinds of organizations, from single proprietors to corporations, and of different kinds of businesses, including wholesale and retail establishments, banks, mail-order houses, hotels, insurance companies, and contracting firms.

The 1913 review continued, that to one who is familiar with accounting practice, the books contain much suggestive material. Unfortunately the data are poorly organized and there is unnecessary repetition both in text and in illustrative material. The discussion of the theory of accounts is hardly more than an exposition of bookkeeping terminology. The last volume contains a number of "Practical Accounting Problems and Solutions." The compilers of the cyclopedia were unfortunate in picking some of their solutions, notably to Problems 49 and 50. These two solutions appear in the volume of a well-known writer' and are incorrect. Incidentally, the editor of the set neglects to give credit to the author of the solutions, either in a footnote or in the list of "Authorities Consulted." This part of the work would also have been materially improved if solutions for Problems 30 to 47 had been given. The review ends with the remark, that from a mechanical point of view the books are excellent; the half-tone illustrations are especially good and are well selected.

== Reception ==
In his days the work of Griffith was occasionally placed inline with the work of Frederick Winslow Taylor, Harrington Emerson, and Henry L. Gantt. In the 1975 article "Who is who in accounting in 1909" the accounting historian Williard E. Stone listed Griffith among the foremost authors and collaborators in the field in the year 1909. More in general he explained:

The early 1900s were a Horacio Alger time when self improvement, particularly in business knowledge, was a way of life for aspiring people. A large number of business encyclopedias enjoyed a wide distribution. One such compendium, Accountancy and Business Management, modest subtitle 'A General Reference. Work on Bookkeeping, Accounting, Auditing, Commercial Law, Business Organization, Business Management, Banking, Advertising, Selling, Office and Factory Records, Cost Keeping, Systematizing, etc.,' offered the complete 'body of knowledge' for the young business person in seven small volumes ...

Of the twenty-one authors and collaborators in the field of accounting, listed by Stone (1975), only eight of them were actually accountants.

== Selected publications ==
- Griffith, James Bray (ed.). Systematizing. International Accountants' Society, inc. Detroit; The Book Keeper Press, 1905.
- Griffith, James Bray. Advertising & Sales Organization : Instruction Paper. Amer. school of correspondence, 1909.
- Griffith, James Bray. Administrative and industrial organization. American school of correspondence, 1909.
- Griffith, James Bray (ed.) et al. Accountancy and business management, 7 volumes, 1909; 2nd ed. 1921
- Griffith, James Bray. (ed.) et al. Cyclopedia of Commerce, Accountancy, Business Administration, 1910. Vol 1.
- Russell, George C. and Griffith, James Bray. Business management : a working handbook of business practice as applied to the organization and administration of industrial and commercial enterprises, including departmental responsibilities, authorities, and methods, Part II.. Chicago : American School of Correspondence, 1913.
- Hathaway, Charles E., and James Bray Griffith. Factory accounts: a working handbook of departmental organization and methods as applied to factories. American school of correspondence, 1913.
- Griffith, James Bray. Practical bookkeeping. American school of correspondence, 1915.
- Griffith, James Bray. Corporation Accounts and Voucher System: A Working Handbook of Approved Methods of Corporation Accounting, with Special Reference to Records of Stock Issues, Manufacturers' Accounts, and the Use of the Voucher System. American technical society, 1917.
- Griffith, James Bray. Practical Bookkeeping: A Working Handbook of Elementary Bookkeeping and Approved Modern Methods of Accounting, Including Single Proprietorship, Partnership, Wholesale, Commission, Storage, and Brokerage Accounts. American technical society, 1918.
- Griffith, James Bray, Correspondence and filing, Chicago, American school, 1923.
