= Charles Gordon (trade unionist) =

British trade union leader and socialist activist

James Charles Gordon (died 5 April 1929) was a British trade union leader and socialist activist.

Born in Lambeth, Gordon completed an apprenticeship as a sheet metal worker with Pender & Baker, and then joined the East London Society of Tin and Iron Plate Workers. He quickly came to prominence in the union, serving on its executive, and then as the union's president. He advocated a single union of sheet metal workers, and in 1889 he persuaded both his own union, and the West London Tin Plate Workers, to affiliate to the National Amalgamated Association of Tin Plate Workers of Great Britain. As a result, in 1895, he was elected as president of this loose federation, and he also served as the part-time organiser of the federation's London district, proving highly successful at recruitment. He began touring the country to recruit to the federation's other affiliates, and so in 1901 he was made the federation's first full-time national organiser and secretary.

In 1920, Gordon persuaded the federation's various affiliates to merge with the General Union of Tinplate Workers, and form the more centralised National Union of Sheet Metal Workers and Braziers. He became the union's first general secretary. However, two years later, he retired due to poor health, and he died in 1929.

Gordon was a member of the Social Democratic Federation for many years, and he also served on the executive of the London Trades Council, working in both organisations with Harry Quelch and Fred Knee.

Trade union offices
Preceded by John Valentine Stevens	General Secretary of the National Amalgamated Association of Tin Plate Workers of Great Britain; 1901–1920	Succeeded by Organisation merged
Preceded by New position	General Secretary of the National Union of Sheet Metal Workers and Braziers; 1920–1922	Succeeded by Charles Hickin
