= Charles Edward Knoeppel =

American organizational theorist (1881–1936)

Charles Edward (C. E.) Knoeppel (15 April 1881 – 29 November 1936) was an American organizational theorist and consultant, who was among the foremost writers on management techniques early 20th century.

== Biography ==
Knoeppel was born in Milwaukee, Wisconsin as son of John C. Knoeppel, a practical molder and foundryman, who had received some patents in 1878, 1881, and later on in 1909. The family moved to Buffalo, New York, where he attended school. Financially unable to continue college, he started to work.

Knoeppel was journalist for a short while, before he started working his way up in an ironworks from laborer to draughtsman and designer to manager in 1904 at the age of 23. The next years he started working as consultant in factories apply the idea's scientific management. In 1909 he started working in the consultancy firm of Harrington Emerson, and in 1914 he founded his own consultancy firm in Philadelphia. named C. E. Knoeppel & Co., Inc.

Knoeppel had adopted the ideal of efficiency, as developed by Harrington Emerson and others and developed the concept in far more details. Around 1905 Knoeppel had started writing a series of articles on efficiency methods, management, organization and administration, and graphic production control in the Engineering Magazine, and later a series of books, which were all published by the Engineering Magazine Company in New York. In 1933 Knoeppel authored the book Profit Engineering to which E. St. Elmo Lewis contributed the chapter "Securing Sales Called for by Profitgraph".

Knoeppel died on 29 November 1936 in Philadelphia, Pennsylvania, USA, just as his last book Managing for profit went on the press.

== Work ==
=== Maximum Production Through Organization and Supervision, 1908 ===
Under the title "Maximum Production Through Organization and Supervision" Knoeppel published a series of four articles in the Engineering Magazine discussing the adjustment of organizations in the factory so that the utmost working efficiency may be secured. The editors introduced this article as follows:

The article following is first of a group of four developing the possibilities of farsighted and fore-sighted control of a manufacturing business so that it may be operated at a minimum of friction and a maximum of productiveness and profit. The first of the series in concerned chiefly with the adjustment of the internal organization to the utmost working efficiency. The following parts will take up successively systematic processing, machining, assembling and erection; the insuring of economy in the use of material and time; and the methods which secure better deliveries and more satisfied customers. - The editors

=== Principles of organization, 1908 ===
In the first article of "Maximum Production Through Organization and Supervision" (1908) Knoeppel raised the subject of a universal application of the principles of organization: the segregation of authority.

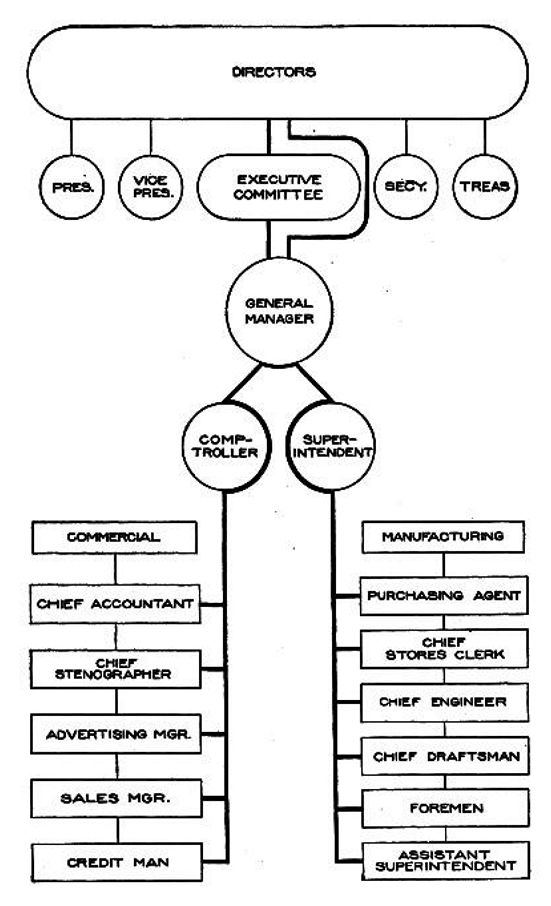
A Chart of Working Authorities in a Manufacturing Business, 1910.

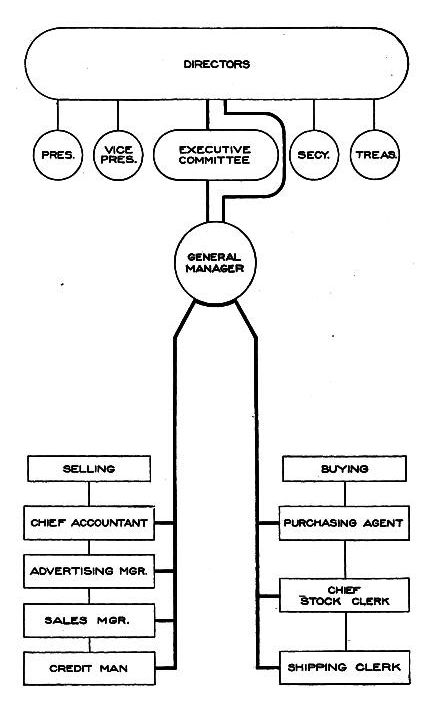
Chart of Working Authorities in a Trading Business, 1910.

"While business as it is now conducted is not as simple as it was in the barter days, it must not be inferred that this segregation of authority is synonymous with complexity, for its very purpose has been to simplify, and that is what it has accomplished. It is only where this segregation has been the result of lack of thought and proper attention, or other like causes, that we find a complex and unsatisfactory condition of affairs. In fact, there is all about us sufficient evidence that many commercial enterprises are being conducted along lines that, as far as evolutional development is concerned, are several stages behind the times.

Furthermore Knoeppel illustrates the principle of segregation needed in the modern factory, by tracing the circumstances of a modern founder of business:

"Let us suppose a case, which will apply in a greater or less degree to the majority. In the earlier development, we will say that the founder of the business was able, on account of its small size, to make what sketches he needed, solicit orders, see that they were filled, perhaps take a hand at the making if occasion required, see to the shipments, and attend to the collections and the keeping of his few accounts. He finds that the business grows, and eventually places a man in charge of certain branches while he looks after others. The accounts eventually require more attention than he can give them so he engages a bookkeeper in order that he may be relieved of the work. He finds that the quantity of materials received and shipped amount to enough to warrant a receiving clerk as well as a shipping clerk, and, to handle this material from its inception to shipment he conceives the idea of placing a man in charge as stock clerk. He then adds a purchasing agent, in order that he may be relieved of the detail and that purchases may be made most economically; a man is placed in charge of the orders; foremen are placed in charge of certain men in the shops; the details connected with making plans, drawings, estimates, etc., are taken over by a practical man; his manager is given a man to look after the shops or engineering branch; while the commercial branch with its many details is placed in the hands of another. As the evolution continues, the selling branch is assumed by one man; cost details are looked after by another; a chief inspector is added in order that all work may be shipped according to specifications; the engineer, who before had been a sort of jack of all trades, is placed in charge of certain work, while an electrician is engaged to look after this particular work; and so this segregation continues as the development continues.
"Perhaps it is not to be wondered at that the founder, in looking backward, is inclined to pat himself on the back when, in a reminiscent mood, he considers what he terms 'remarkable development.' He considers that he has been wonderfully successful in building up a business which at the beginning was so small as to admit of his supervising every detail, while today he employs a dozen men to do the work he once did. There is no getting away from the fact that it is this same feeling of self-satisfaction that is responsible for a large number of faulty organizations, for if we should tell this manufacturer that his business is far from being as successful as it is possible for it to be ... he would vigorously resent any such accusation; but the fact remains that it is not the success it should be, for the very reason that the development has been allowed practically to take care of itself. New men were added, new offices created, only when absolutely necessary, each newcomer being given a general idea of what was expected of him, and not knowing, not thinking, or perhaps not having the time to give more than passing attention to the matter, the proprietor did not consider the fact that his business was a unit, with each worker a part, having a distinct relation with every other worker. Hence, as the efficiency of any organization is directly in proportion to the care with which these relations are considered and treated, his organization naturally fails to attain that degree of efficiency obtainable, and for this condition he, and he only is responsible."

James Bray Griffith in the Cyclopedia of Commerce, Accountancy, Business Administration (1910) argued, that "when we go into all of the ramifications of business we find many establishments where minor variations of our plan of organization appear necessary, but in the final analysis, the fundamentals prove to be the same." The working authorities in a manufacturing Business and in a trading Business follow a same scheme (see images).

=== Industrial preparedness ===
Knoeppel was a disciple of Frederick Winslow Taylor, who promoted to concept of "industrial preparedness." He for example stated:

"The chemist mixes a definite quantity of this and a definite amount of that, and he has what he knew would be the result of the combination of the elements.. The manufacturer mixes tons of this, feet of that, so many machines, some money, men, and knows absolutely nothing about the real outcome as regards cost and efficiency until the product is completed."

According to Sheldon (2003) this is "a revelation not only of lack of accurate and immediate knowledge, but also of lack of that type of mentality which can map out a course for its activities and proceed methodically to follow that course." This could be solved by improving the so-called industrial preparedness.

== Selected publications ==
- C.E. Knoeppel. Maximum production in machine-shop and foundry, New York, The Engineering Magazine, 1911.
- C.E. Knoeppel. Installing efficiency methods, New York, The Engineering Magazine, 1915.
- C.E. Knoeppel. Organization and administration, Vol 1 - Vol 6. New York, The Engineering Magazine, 1917-1919.
- C.E. Knoeppel. Graphic production control. New York, The Engineering magazine company, 1920
- C.E. Knoeppel and E. St. Elmo Lewis. Profit Engineering, McGraw-Hill, 1933.
- Charles Edward Knoeppel, Edgar G. Seybold. Managing for profit: working methods for profit planning and control. 1937.

Articles, a selection:

- Knoeppel, F. J. "Systematic foundry operation and foundry costing." The Engineering Magazine 36 (1908): 211-25.
- C.E. Knoeppel. "Maximum Production Through Organization and Supervision." in The Engineering Magazine. Vol 25. (1908); Part 1, Part 2, Part 3, Part 4.
