= Birmingham and Midland Sheet Metal Workers' Society =

English trade union

- Merged into: National Union of Sheet Metal Workers, Coppersmiths, Heating and Domestic Engineers
- Founded: 1859
- Dissolved: 1973
- Headquarters: 134 Bromsgrove Street, Birmingham
- Location: England
- Members: 8,315 (1968)
- Key people: John Valentine Stevens (Gen Sec)
- Parent organization: National Amalgamated Association of Tin Plate Workers (1876–1909)
- Affiliations: TUC

The Birmingham and Midland Sheet Metal Workers' Society (BMSMWS) was a trade union representing sheet metal workers in the English Midlands.

The union's origins lay in the Birmingham Tin Plate Workers' Society, which was formed in 1859. In 1876, it merged with the Wolverhampton Tin Plate Workers' Society to form what later became the National Amalgamated Association of Tin Plate Workers. The societies retained much of their independence, particularly in the early years. In 1906, the society renamed itself as the Birmingham Operative Tin-Plate, Sheet Metal Workers and Braziers' Society.

In 1909, the Birmingham society fell into dispute with the National Amalgamated Association over payments to workers involved in disputes. As a result, it left, forming the independent Birmingham and Midland Sheet Metal Workers' Society. This remained independent when all the other sheet metal workers' unions merged into the National Union of Sheet Metal Workers and Braziers, until it finally joined the National Union of Sheet Metal Workers, Coppersmiths, Heating and Domestic Engineers in 1973.

== Secretaries ==
1909: John Valentine Stevens
1920: Charles Brett
1939: Richard Baston
1951: Harry Townsend
1959: Alf Cooper
