= John Valentine Stevens =

British trade unionist and Lib-Lab politician

John Valentine Stevens (13 March 1852 – 14 August 1925) was a British trade unionist and Lib-Lab politician.

Born in Bristol, Stevens completed an apprenticeship as a tinplate worker before moving to Birmingham. In 1874, he joined the Amalgamated Tin Plate Workers of Birmingham, Wolverhampton and District, and was elected as its president in 1880, and then as Secretary in 1886. In this role, he persuaded the various local associations of tinplate workers to unite, forming the National Amalgamated Association of Tin-Plate Workers in 1894. He was elected Secretary of the new union, dominating it until his retirement in 1919.

Stevens was elected to Birmingham City Council on its formation in 1889, defeating Austen Chamberlain, and retaining his seat as a Liberal-Labour member until 1907. At the 1900 general election, he stood in Birmingham East, but lost heavily, and was again defeated in December 1910.

In 1897, the annual Trades Union Congress was held in Birmingham, and Stevens served as its President. He also held various prominent roles on the Birmingham Trades Council, was the first President of the National Committee of Organised Labour for Promoting Old Age Pensions for All, and was prominent in the Ancient Order of Foresters.

Trade union offices
Preceded by John Mallinson	President of the Trades Union Congress; 1897	Succeeded by James O'Grady
Preceded by J. Deans	General Secretary of the National Amalgamated Association of Tin Plate Workers of Great Britain; 1886–1902	Succeeded by Charles Gordon
Preceded by New position	General Secretary of the Birmingham and Midland Sheet Metal Workers' Society; 1909–1919	Succeeded by C. F. Brett
Preceded by Allan Grainger	President of the Birmingham Trades Council; 1887–1889	Succeeded by Alfred Jephcott
