= General Union of Tinplate Workers =

Former trade union of the United Kingdom

The General Union of Tinplate Workers was a trade union representing sheet metal workers in the United Kingdom.

The union was founded in 1862 in Manchester, bringing together nine local societies of tin plate workers from across Lancashire. Initially, its main aim was to help skilled tin plate workers find employment. However, it grew rapidly, and from 1871, it began offering welfare services, including pensions, and payments to unemployed members, and to the families of members who died. It accepted only members who had completed an apprenticeship in the trade, and charged older members higher joining fees.

By 1876, the union was based in Liverpool, and most of its membership were connected with shipbuilding. It opposed piece work, largely because the jobs done by its members were too varied to construct a single agreed price list.

In 1892, the union changed its name to the General Union of Braziers and Sheet Metal Workers and, the following year, was successful enough to make its post of secretary a full-time one. It joined the Federation of Engineering and Shipbuilding Trades in 1897, and the National Amalgamated Sheet Metal Workers' and Braziers' Society in 1900. It merged with National Amalgamated Association of Tin Plate Workers of Great Britain and a large number of local unions in 1920 to form the National Union of Sheet Metal Workers and Braziers.

== General Secretaries ==
1861: T. Dunn
1882: John Wiltshire
1913: Archibald T. Kidd
