= George Guy (trade unionist) =

British trade unionist

Leslie George Guy (1 September 1918 – 4 December 2005) was a British trade unionist.

Guy came to prominence as a member of the National Union of Sheet Metal Workers and Braziers. He served as a shop steward, on his district committee and then the National Executive Committee before, in 1972, winning election as National President of the union. In 1974, he instead became Assistant General Secretary, then in 1977 he was elected as General Secretary.

Alongside the secretaryship of the union, Guy was elected to the executive of the Confederation of Shipbuilding and Engineering Unions, and to the General Council of the Trades Union Congress (TUC). However, in 1983, the General Council was reorganised and Guy lost his seat. Later that year, the Sheet Metal Workers merged into the Technical, Administrative and Supervisory Section union, Guy becoming assistant secretary of its craft section. He retired the following year.

Trade union offices
Preceded by Les Buck	General Secretary of the National Union of Sheet Metal Workers, Coppersmiths, Heating and Domestic Engineers; 1977 – 1983	Succeeded by Position abolished
