= Archibald T. Kidd =

British trade union leader

Archibald Thomas Kidd (15 April 1873 – 15 June 1972) was a long-standing British trade union leader.

Born in Liverpool, Kidd was educated at Brunswick Wesleyan School. He completed an apprenticeship as a sheet metal worker with Bennett Brothers and Butler & Forester's. In his spare time, he took evening classes to further his education. This enabled him to enter the Liverpool School of Technology, where he studied metal plate working, taking first class honours and the Bronze Medal of the City and Guilds. Following this, he studied at the University of Liverpool on a scholarship, and also with Ruskin College and the American School of Correspondence.

In 1893, Kidd joined the Liverpool Society of Tin Plate Workers, and was elected to its committee one year later, as soon as he became eligible. The society was affiliated to the General Union of Braziers and Sheet Metal Workers, and in 1906, Kidd was elected as its assistant secretary, succeeding as its general secretary in 1913. In 1920, he took a leading role in a merger which formed the National Union of Sheet Metal Workers and Braziers, with Kidd initially serving as secretary of its number 2 district. He became the union's assistant general secretary in 1923, also serving on the Executive Committee of the Federation of Engineering and Shipbuilding Trades (FEST). Concerned that the FEST did not provide for effective action, he successfully proposed that it was transformed into the Confederation of Shipbuilding and Engineering Unions. In addition, he served on the executive of the National Council of Labour Colleges, and taught social history to workers in his spare time.

Kidd was also active in the Labour Party, and was a leading figure in the party in Clapham.

Kidd finally succeeded as the union's general secretary in 1941, but he retired two years later. In retirement, he wrote The History of the Tin Plate Workers, Sheet Metal Workers and Braziers Societies. He lived to the age of 99.

Trade union offices
Preceded by John Wiltshire	General Secretary of the General Union of Braziers and Sheet Metal Workers; 1913–1920	Succeeded by Position abolished
Preceded by Charles Hickin	Assistant Secretary of the National Union of Sheet Metal Workers and Braziers; 1923–1941	Succeeded by Harry Brotherton
Preceded by Charles Hickin	General Secretary of the National Union of Sheet Metal Workers and Braziers; 1941–1943	Succeeded by Harry Brotherton
