= National Society of Coppersmiths, Braziers and Metal Workers =

Former trade union of the United Kingdom

The National Society of Coppersmiths, Braziers and Metal Workers was a trade union representing foundry workers in the United Kingdom.

The union was established in 1846 as the London and Provincial Society of Coppersmiths. It grew very slowly, reaching 464 members by 1900. In 1910, it changed its name to the "National Society of Coppersmiths, Braziers and Metal Workers", extending its potential membership, which immediately rose to 775. By the 1950s, it had a membership of around 6,000 workers, mostly based in London.

In July 1959, the union merged with the rival National Union of Sheet Metal Workers and Braziers to form the National Union of Sheet Metal Workers and Coppersmiths.

== General Secretaries ==
1904: George Rick
1910: Henry Stansfield
1947: Harold E. Poole
