= American School of Correspondence =

American distance-education high school

Coordinates: 41.586919°N 87.563254°W

The American School of Correspondence is a private, not-for-profit American distance education middle school, high school and college preparatory institution in Lansing, Illinois. It was founded in 1897 and is one of the oldest and largest distance education institutions in the world.

== History ==
The American School of Correspondence (ASC) was founded in 1897. It was located in the Hyde Park, Chicago, neighborhood from 1912 to 1996, when it moved to south suburban Lansing.

The L. L. Cooke School of Electricity was an early correspondence course on electrical theory and practice. The course covered various topics in electrical technology from alarms to wiring. The correspondence course company was based in Chicago, and operated at least as early as 1927. Its courses were published by the ASC.

== American Technical Society ==
American Technical Society holds copyright on books published by The American School of Correspondence.

== Program ==
The ASC is a non-public secondary school and offers its own diploma. High school students can complete four years' worth of credits at their own pace, often taking less time than in a traditional high school. All exams in the more than 70 courses offered are hand graded by a qualified staff of full-time and part-time instructors. Additionally, the school works with thousands of public, private, and parochial schools throughout the United States to offer distance learning courses to students who have fallen behind in credits, or are working at an accelerated rate. The credits for these correspondence courses are then transferred to the student's high school.

=== Accreditation ===
It is accredited by the Middle States Association of Colleges and Schools (MSA-CESS) and the National Council for Private School Accreditation (NCPSA).

== Notable alumni ==
- Andre Agassi
- Jessica Alba
- Wilson Chandler
- Tiffany Evans
- The Everly Brothers
- Bob Feller
- Members of The Flying Wallendas
- Archibald T. Kidd
- Anna Kournikova
- Donny Osmond
- Marie Osmond
- Christopher Paolini
- Travis Pastrana
- Mary Pierce
- Shulamit Ran
- Selena
- Jamie Wyeth
- Sho Yano

== Notable faculty ==
- James Bray Griffith
