= Birmingham Bordesley =

Parliamentary constituency in the United Kingdom, 1885–1918

- Former borough constituency for the House of Commons
- County: Warwickshire

1885–1918
- Seats: One
- Created from: Birmingham
- Replaced by: Birmingham Moseley, Birmingham Deritend

Birmingham Bordesley was a borough constituency in the city of Birmingham, which returned one Member of Parliament (MP) to the House of Commons of the Parliament of the United Kingdom. Elections were held using the first-past-the-post voting system.

The constituency was created upon the abolition of the multi-member Birmingham seat in 1885 and abolished in 1918.

== Boundaries ==
Before 1885 Birmingham, in the county of Warwickshire, had been a three-member constituency (see Birmingham (UK Parliament constituency) for further details). Under the Redistribution of Seats Act 1885 the parliamentary borough of Birmingham was split into seven single-member divisions, one of which was Birmingham Bordesley. It consisted of the wards of Bordesley and St Bartholomew's.

The division was located in the south-east corner of the city, within its boundaries in 1885. To the west was Birmingham South, to the north Birmingham East, to the east Tamworth and to the south East Worcestershire.

In the 1918 redistribution of parliamentary seats, the Representation of the People Act 1918 provided for twelve new Birmingham divisions. The Bordesley division was abolished.

== Members of Parliament ==
Year	Member	Party
1885	Henry Broadhurst	Liberal/Labour
1886	Jesse Collings	Liberal Unionist
1912	Jesse Collings	Unionist
1918	Constituency abolished	

Note: Broadhurst was an official Liberal MP who, as a leading Trade Unionist, was known as a Liberal/Labour politician. He was Secretary of the Trades Union Congress Parliamentary Committee (equivalent to the later office of General Secretary of the TUC) 1876-1885 and 1886–1890.

== Elections ==
=== Elections in the 1880s ===
Broadhurst

General election 1885: Birmingham Bordesley
Party	Candidate	Votes	%	±%
Lib-Lab	Henry Broadhurst	5,362	57.2	
Conservative	Walter Showell	4,019	42.8	
Majority		1,343	14.4	
Turnout		6,705	83.9	
Registered electors		11,178		
Lib-Lab win (new seat)				

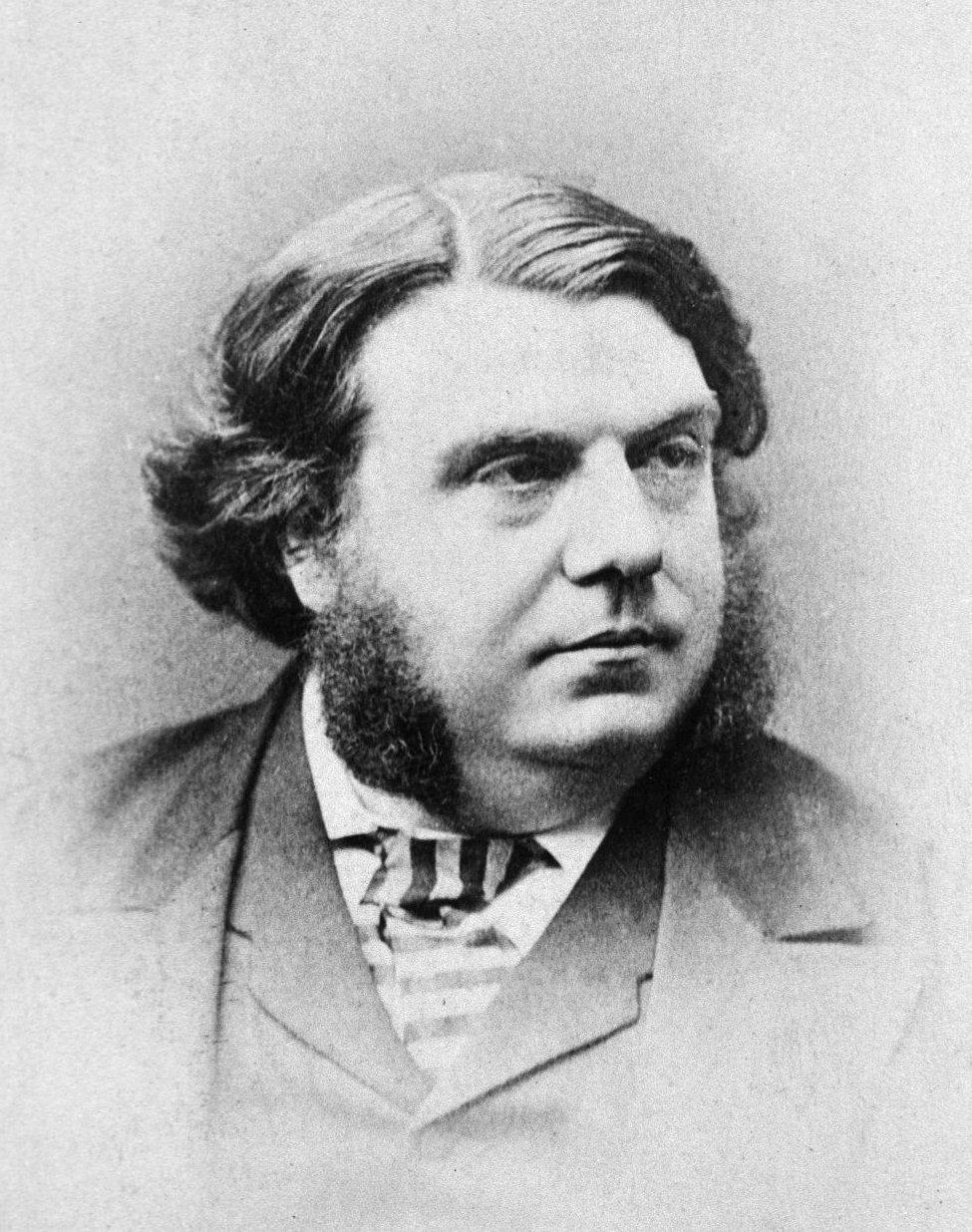
Tait

General election 1886: Birmingham Bordesley
Party	Candidate	Votes	%	±%
Liberal Unionist	Jesse Collings	4,475	81.1	+38.3
Liberal	Lawson Tait	1,040	18.9	−38.3
Majority		3,435	62.2	N/A
Turnout		5,515	49.3	−34.6
Registered electors		11,178		
Liberal Unionist gain from Lib-Lab		Swing	+38.3	

=== Elections in the 1890s ===
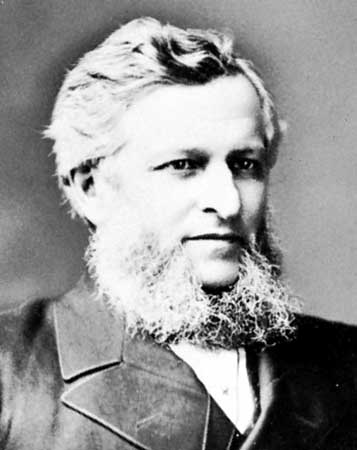
Collings

General election 1892: Birmingham Bordesley
Party	Candidate	Votes	%	±%
Liberal Unionist	Jesse Collings	6,380	70.6	−10.5
Lib-Lab	William John Davis	2,658	29.4	+10.5
Majority		3,722	41.2	−21.0
Turnout		9,038	70.2	+20.9
Registered electors		12,876		
Liberal Unionist hold		Swing	-10.5	

General election 1895: Birmingham Bordesley
Party	Candidate	Votes	%	±%
Liberal Unionist	Jesse Collings	6,004	73.6	+3.0
Liberal	William Cook	2,154	26.4	−3.0
Majority		3,850	47.2	+6.0
Turnout		8,158	59.0	−11.2
Registered electors		13,824		
Liberal Unionist hold		Swing	+3.0	

=== Elections in the 1900s ===
General election 1900: Birmingham Bordesley
Party	Candidate	Votes	%	±%
Liberal Unionist	Jesse Collings	Unopposed		
Liberal Unionist hold				

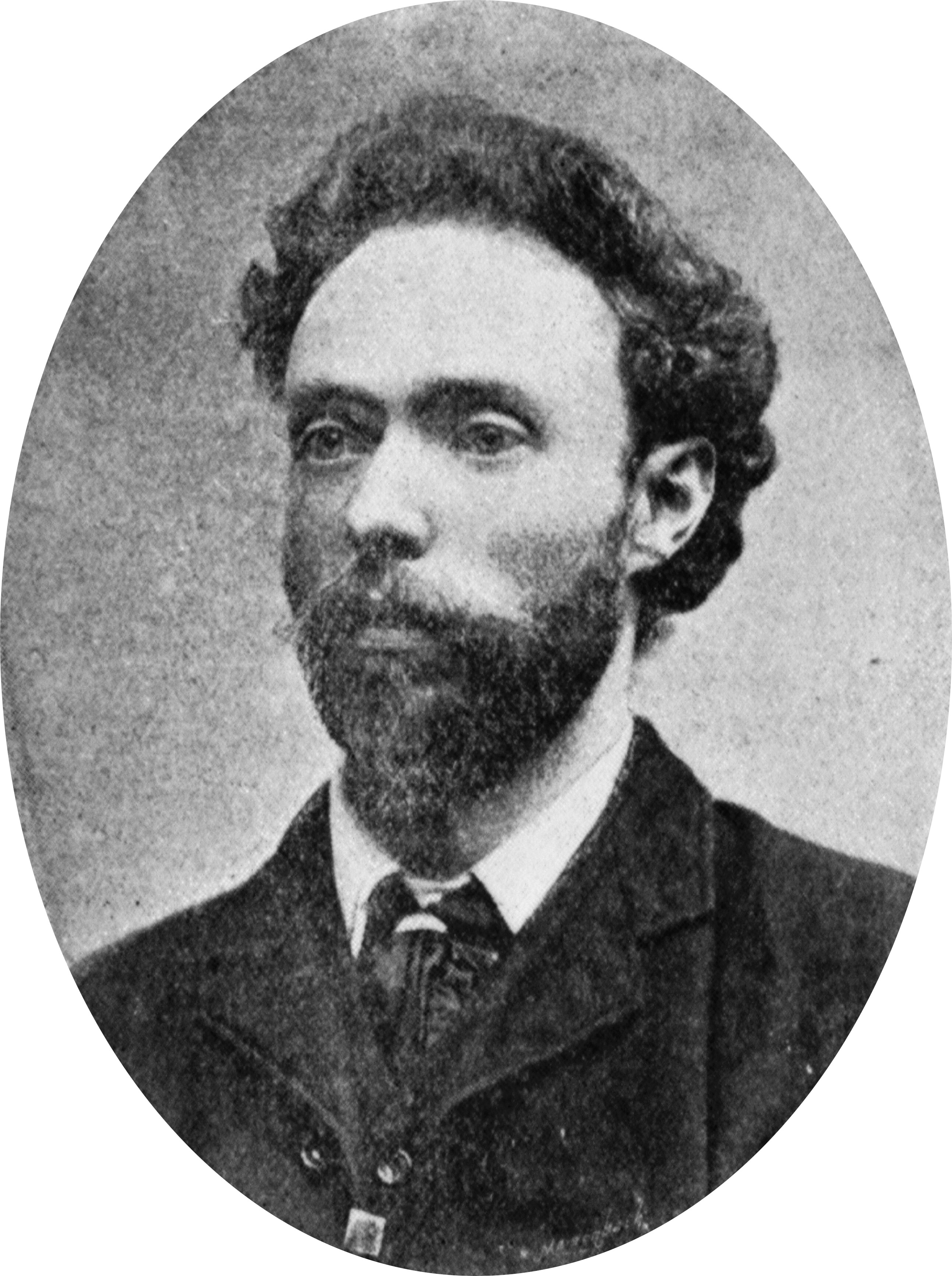
Glasier

General election 1906: Birmingham Bordesley
Party	Candidate	Votes	%	±%
Liberal Unionist	Jesse Collings	7,763	66.1	N/A
Labour Repr. Cmte.	John Bruce Glasier	3,976	33.9	New
Majority		3,787	32.2	N/A
Turnout		11,739	70.5	N/A
Registered electors		16,653		
Liberal Unionist hold		Swing	N/A	

=== Elections in the 1910s ===
General election January 1910: Birmingham Bordesley
Party	Candidate	Votes	%	±%
Liberal Unionist	Jesse Collings	9,021	72.3	+6.2
Labour	Fred Hughes	3,453	27.7	−6.2
Majority		5,568	44.6	+12.4
Turnout		12,474	71.9	+1.4
Liberal Unionist hold		Swing	+6.2	

General election December 1910: Birmingham Bordesley
Party	Candidate	Votes	%	±%
Liberal Unionist	Jesse Collings	Unopposed		
Liberal Unionist hold				

General Election 1914–15:

Another General Election was required to take place before the end of 1915. The political parties had been making preparations for an election to take place and by July 1914, the following candidates had been selected;

- Unionist: John William Dennis
- Liberal: George Jackson

== See also ==
- List of former United Kingdom Parliament constituencies
