= Les Buck =

British trade unionist (1915–1984)

Leslie William Buck (30 May 1915 – 23 December 1984) was a British trade unionist.

Buck grew up in Middlesex and attended Willesden County Grammar School. He completed an apprenticeship as a panel beater, and joined the National Union of Sheet Metal Workers and Braziers.

Buck gradually rose to prominence in the Sheet Metal Workers, becoming a district officer in 1957, then district secretary in 1960, and general secretary of the union in 1962. In 1964, he was also elected to the executive of the Confederation of Shipbuilding and Engineering Unions, serving as its president in 1975/6, and from 1971 he served on the General Council of the Trades Union Congress.

In 1973, the Electrical, Electronic, Telecommunications and Plumbing Union opened talks with the Sheet Metal Workers regarding a possible merger, and in exchange offered Buck the post of general secretary, but the merger did not go ahead.

Buck retired from his trade union posts in 1977, joining the board of British Aerospace until his final retirement in 1982.

Trade union offices
Preceded by E. Roberts	General Secretary of the National Union of Sheet Metal Workers, Coppersmiths, Heating and Domestic Engineers; 1962 – 1977	Succeeded by George Guy
Preceded by Charles Stewart	President of the Confederation of Shipbuilding and Engineering Unions; 1975 – 1976	Succeeded by Len Edmondson
