= Heating and Domestic Engineers' Union =

Former trade union of the United Kingdom

- Merged into: National Union of Sheet Metal Workers and Coppersmiths
- Founded: 1872
- Dissolved: 1967
- Headquarters: 917 Warwick Road, Solihull
- Location: United Kingdom
- Members: 23,592 (1966)
- Affiliations: TUC, CSEU

The Heating and Domestic Engineers' Union (H&DEU) was a trade union representing a wide range of workers, particularly those involved with domestic pipework, in the United Kingdom.

The union was founded in 1872 as the Amalgamated Stove, Grate and Kitchen Range Fitters' Protection Society. It hoped to compete with the Amalgamated Society of Engineers by restricting its membership to those in a specific trade, but was also less selective in deciding the qualifications for membership.

The union survived, but remained very small for many years with only 360 by the end of the century. It changed its name to the Amalgamated Society of Kitchen Range, Hot Water, Art Metal and Other Fitters Concerned with the Above Trades in 1887, then to the United Society of Fitters and Smiths in 1898.

In 1908, the Amalgamated Society of Whitesmiths, Domestic Engineers and General Pipe Fitters and the Birmingham Society of Hot Water and Steam Engineers merged into the union, which changed its name to the National Union of Operative Heating and Domestic Engineers, Whitesmiths and General Iron Workers. It relocated its head office to Birmingham, and was finally able to claim a membership of more than 1,000 workers.

The Society of Smiths, Fitters, Hot Water and Steam Engineers merged into the union in 1911. In 1948, it renamed itself as the National Union of Operative Heating and Domestic Engineers and General Iron Workers, then in 1956 it shortened this to the "Heating and Domestic Engineers' Union".

In 1967, the union merged into the National Union of Sheet Metal Workers and Coppersmiths.

== General Secretaries ==
1891: Richard Witham
1891: Robert Sewell
1920s: Ted Pacey
1953: Leonard Green
