= Harry Brotherton =

British trade union leader

Henry George John Brotherton CBE (3 December 1890 – December 1980) was a British trade union leader.

Born in Camberwell, London, Brotherton completed an apprenticeship as a sheet metal worker. He joined the National Union of Sheet Metal Workers and Braziers in the final year of his apprenticeship, the earliest point at which he was eligible to do so. He was elected to the executive of the London District in 1923, serving a single year, and during the 1926 UK general strike, took the lead on paying benefits to union members in North London. He was re-elected to the district executive in 1927, and then in 1929 became the union's full-time London District Secretary.

Brotherton also served on his union's National Executive Committee, and in 1934/35 was its General President. During World War II, he served on several government committees, and in 1941 he was elected as the union's Assistant General Secretary. Two years later, he became the union's General Secretary. He also served as President of the Confederation of Shipbuilding and Engineering Unions from 1948 until 1958, served on the Railway Shopmen's National Council, Engineering Advisory Council, and chaired the Gas Industry Negotiating Committee for Craftsmen.

In the 1949 New Year Honours, Brotherton was made a Commander of the Order of the British Empire.

He died in 1980 following his 90th birthday.

Trade union offices
Preceded by Archibald T. Kidd	Assistant General Secretary of the National Union of Sheet Metal Workers and Braziers; 1941–1943	Succeeded by E. Roberts
Preceded by Archibald T. Kidd	General Secretary of the National Union of Sheet Metal Workers and Braziers; 1943–1960	Succeeded by E. Roberts
Preceded by Mark Hodgson	President of the Confederation of Shipbuilding and Engineering Unions; 1948–1958	Succeeded by Wilfred Beard
