= Birmingham East (UK Parliament constituency) =

Parliamentary constituency in the United Kingdom, 1885–1918

- Former borough constituency for the House of Commons
- Local government in West Midlands: Warwickshire

1885–1918
- Created from: Birmingham
- Replaced by: Birmingham Duddeston (Majority), Birmingham Erdington (Part), Birmingham Yardley (Part)

Birmingham East was a parliamentary constituency in the city of Birmingham, England. It returned one Member of Parliament (MP) to the House of Commons of the Parliament of the United Kingdom, elected by the first-past-the-post voting system.

The constituency was created upon the abolition of the Birmingham constituency in 1885, and was itself abolished for the 1918 general election.

== Boundaries ==
Before 1885 Birmingham, in the county of Warwickshire, had been a three-member constituency (see Birmingham (UK Parliament constituency) for further details). Under the Redistribution of Seats Act 1885 the parliamentary borough of Birmingham was split into seven single-member divisions, one of which was Birmingham East. It consisted of the wards of Duddeston and Nechells, the local government district of Saltley, and the hamlet of Little Bromwich.

The division was bounded to the west by Birmingham North, to the north by Aston Manor, to the east by Tamworth and to the south (from west to east) by Birmingham Central, Birmingham South and Birmingham Bordesley.

In the 1918 redistribution of parliamentary seats, the Representation of the People Act 1918 provided for twelve new Birmingham divisions. The East division was abolished.

== Members of Parliament ==
Election	Member	Party
1885	William Cook	Liberal
1886	Henry Matthews	Conservative
1895	Sir John Benjamin Stone	Conservative
1910 (Jan)	Arthur Steel-Maitland	Conservative
1918	Constituency abolished	

== Elections ==
=== Elections in the 1880s ===
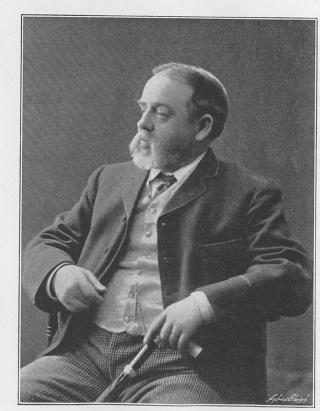
William Cook

General election 1885: Birmingham East
Party	Candidate	Votes	%
Liberal	William Cook	4,277	58.6
Conservative	Francis Lowe	3,025	41.4
Majority		1,252	17.2
Turnout		7,302	77.8
Registered electors		9,382	
Liberal win (new seat)			

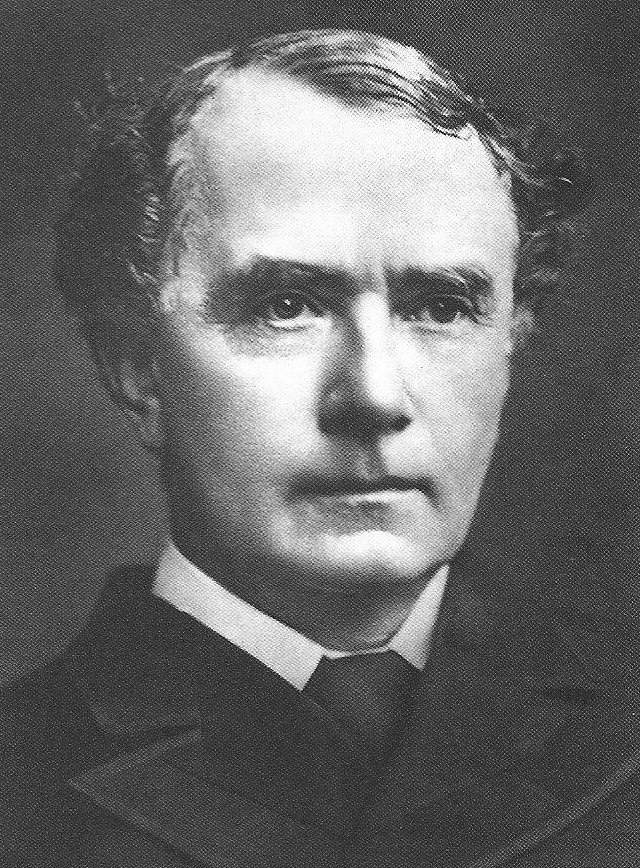
Matthews

General election 1886: Birmingham East
Party	Candidate	Votes	%	±%
Conservative	Henry Matthews	3,341	56.7	+15.3
Liberal	William Cook	2,552	43.3	−15.3
Majority		789	13.4	N/A
Turnout		5,893	62.8	−15.0
Registered electors		9,382		
Conservative gain from Liberal		Swing	+15.3	

Matthews was appointed Home Secretary, requiring a by-election.

By-election, 11 Aug 1886: Birmingham East
Party	Candidate	Votes	%	±%
Conservative	Henry Matthews	Unopposed		
Conservative hold				

=== Elections in the 1890s ===
Fulford

General election 1892: Birmingham East
Party	Candidate	Votes	%	±%
Conservative	Henry Matthews	5,041	61.7	+5.0
Liberal	Henry Charles Fulford	2,832	34.7	−8.6
Independent Liberal	Daniel Shilton Collin (Note: Collin was associated with the United Kingdom Alliance)	296	3.6	New
Majority		2,209	27.0	+13.6
Turnout		8,169	78.5	+15.7
Registered electors		10,404		
Conservative hold		Swing	+6.8	

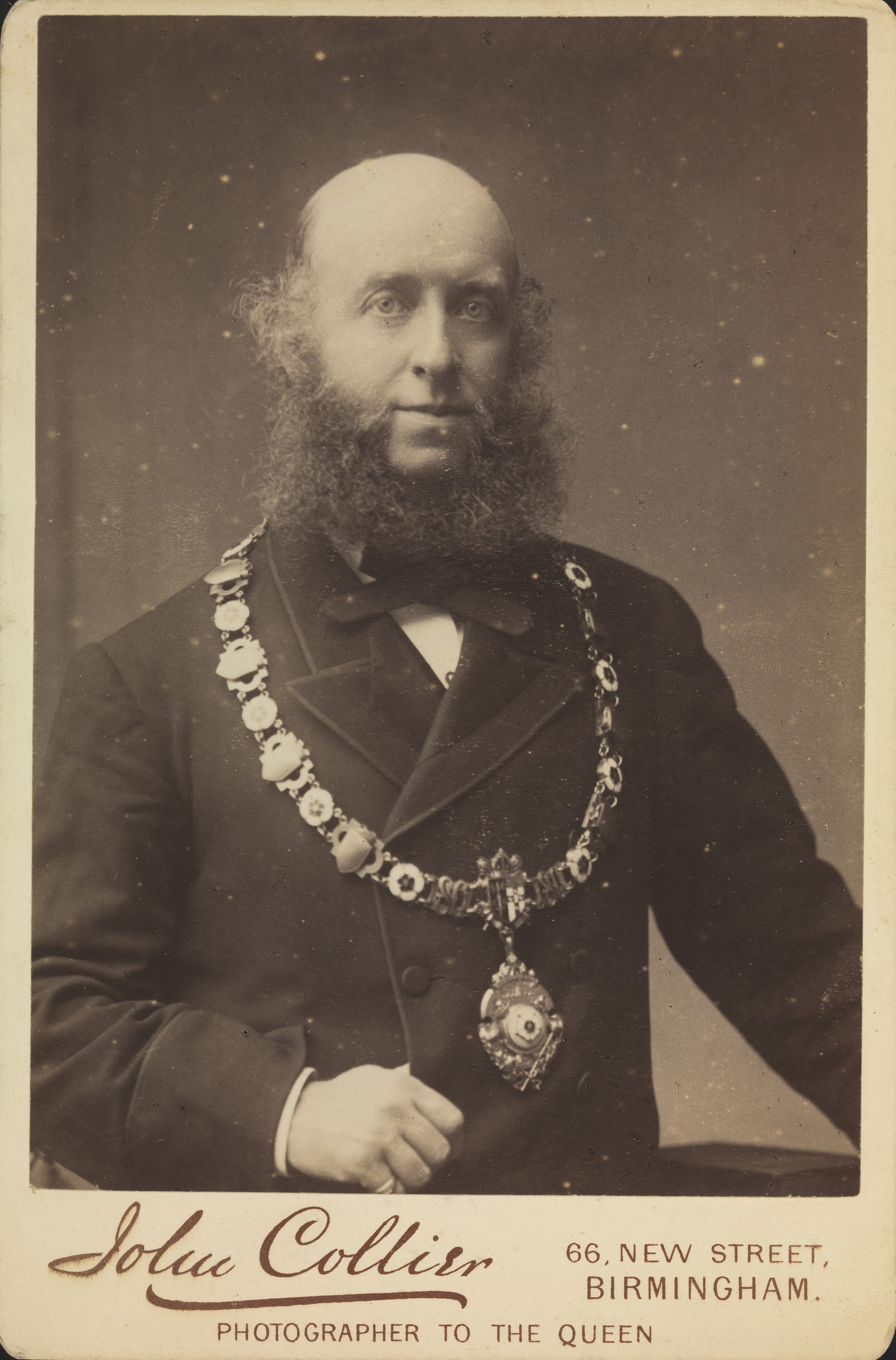
Stone

General election 1895: Birmingham East
Party	Candidate	Votes	%	±%
Conservative	John Benjamin Stone	Unopposed		
Conservative hold				

=== Elections in the 1900s ===
General election 1900: Birmingham East
Party	Candidate	Votes	%	±%
Conservative	John Benjamin Stone	4,989	63.8	N/A
Lib-Lab	John Valentine Stevens	2,835	36.2	New
Majority		2,154	27.6	N/A
Turnout		7,824	59.9	N/A
Registered electors		13,070		
Conservative hold		Swing	N/A	

General election 1906: Birmingham East
Party	Candidate	Votes	%	±%
Conservative	John Benjamin Stone	5,928	52.6	−11.2
Labour Repr. Cmte.	James Holmes	5,343	47.4	+11.2
Majority		585	5.2	−22.4
Turnout		11,271	77.9	+18.0
Registered electors		14,469		
Conservative hold		Swing	−11.2	

=== Elections in the 1910s ===
General election January 1910: Birmingham East
Party	Candidate	Votes	%	±%
Conservative	Arthur Steel-Maitland	8,460	68.1	+15.5
Labour	J. J. Stephenson	3,958	31.9	−15.5
Majority		4,502	36.2	+31.0
Turnout		12,418	81.5	+1.6
Conservative hold		Swing	15.5	

General election December 1910: Birmingham East
Party	Candidate	Votes	%	±%
Conservative	Arthur Steel-Maitland	6,639	67.5	−0.6
Lib-Lab	John Valentine Stevens	3,190	32.5	+0.6
Majority		3,449	35.0	−1.2
Turnout		9,829	64.5	−17.0
Conservative hold		Swing	-1.2	

General Election 1914–15:

Another General Election was required to take place before the end of 1915. The political parties had been making preparations for an election to take place and by July 1914, the following candidates had been selected;

- Unionist: Arthur Steel-Maitland
- Labour: George Shann

== In popular culture ==
Birmingham East was used in BBC sitcom Yes Minister, and Jim Hacker was its MP. Although Hacker's Party was left unspecified, he was shown to be elected in the fictional 1981 general election, defeating a Conservative and Labour challenger. During the declaration of the result, Hacker was shown wearing a white rosette.

1981 general election: Birmingham East
Party	Candidate	Votes	%	±%
n/a	James George Hacker	21,793	48.2	
n/a	Arthur William Gaunt	19,321	42.7	
n/a	David Lloyd Evans	4,106	9.1	
Majority		2,472	5.5	
Turnout		45,220		
n/a hold		Swing		

== See also ==
- List of former United Kingdom Parliament constituencies

== Notes and references ==
Notes

References

- Boundaries of Parliamentary Constituencies 1885-1972, compiled and edited by F.W.S. Craig (Parliamentary Reference Publications 1972)
- British Parliamentary Election Results 1885-1918, compiled and edited by F.W.S. Craig (Macmillan Press 1974)
- Debrett’s Illustrated Heraldic and Biographical House of Commons and the Judicial Bench 1886
- Debrett’s House of Commons and the Judicial Bench 1901
- Debrett’s House of Commons and the Judicial Bench 1918
- Leigh Rayment's Historical List of MPs – Constituencies beginning with "B" (part 3)
