= National Union of Sheet Metal Workers, Coppersmiths, Heating and Domestic Engineers =

Trade union

NUSMWCHDE
- National Union of Sheet Metal Workers, Coppersmiths, Heating and Domestic Engineers
- Merged into: Technical, Administrative and Supervisory Section
- Founded: 1920
- Dissolved: 1983
- Headquarters: 75/77 West Heath Road, London
- Location: United Kingdom, Ireland
- Members: 74,550 (1980)
- Publication: The Journal
- Affiliations: TUC, CSEU, LMTU, Labour

The National Union of Sheet Metal Workers, Coppersmiths, Heating and Domestic Engineers was a trade union in the United Kingdom and Ireland.

== History ==
The union was founded in July 1920 as the National Union of Sheet Metal Workers and Braziers with the merger of a number of unions, including the General Union of Tinplate Workers and the National Amalgamated Association of Tin Plate Workers of Great Britain, and fifteen local unions. It merged with the competing National Society of Coppersmiths, Braziers and Metal Workers in 1959, renaming itself the National Union of Sheet Metal Workers and Coppersmiths. Following its 1967 merger with the Heating and Domestic Engineers' Union, it took its final, lengthy name.

The last independent union for sheet metal workers, the Birmingham and Midland Sheet Metal Workers' Society, finally merged into the union in 1973.

The union approved an offer to join the Amalgamated Union of Engineering Workers' Engineering Section in 1979, but this did not go ahead and instead, in 1983, it merged into the Technical, Administrative and Supervisory Section.

== Election results ==
The union sponsored a Labour Party candidate in the 1979 general election:

Constituency	Candidate	Votes	Percentage	Position
Hendon North	Frank Arthur Cooper	14,374	36.0	2

== General Secretaries ==
1920: Charles Gordon
1922: Charles Hickin
1941: Archibald Kidd
1943: Harry Brotherton
1960: Ted Roberts
1962: Les Buck
1977: George Guy
