= William Cook (British industrialist) =

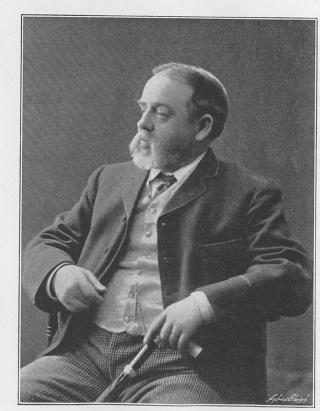
Portrait by John Arthur Draycott, from Handsworth magazine, August 1894

Sir William Thomas Gustavus Cook (1834 – 26 January 1908) was a British industrialist and Liberal politician who was active in local government in Birmingham and sat in the House of Commons from 1885 to 1886.

He was the second son of Anselm Cook of Kingscourt, Stroud, Gloucestershire, where he was born. He took up an apprenticeship to the pin and wire trade in Birmingham and subsequently set up his own business as a manufacturer of tacks and shoe rivets.

In 1872 Cook was elected to Birmingham Town Council, and in 1875 became chairman of the Borough Health Committee. He was made an alderman in 1882, and served as Mayor of Birmingham in 1883/84.

In 1885 he was selected as Liberal candidate for the newly created constituency of Birmingham East, and won the seat at general election of that year. He was only a member of the House of Commons for a brief period, however, as he was defeated by his Conservative opponent when another election was held in 1886. He was an unsuccessful parliamentary candidate for the Bordesley constituency of Birmingham at the 1895 general election.

Cook was a justice of the peace for Warwickshire and the City of Birmingham, and made his home at Ashley House, Birchfield, Staffordshire, on the outskirts of the city. He was knighted in 1906.

William Cook died in Blackpool in January 1908, aged 73.

Parliament of the United Kingdom
New constituency	Member of Parliament for Birmingham East; 1885–1886	Succeeded by Henry Matthews
