= American Technical Publishers =

American Technical Publishers (ATP) is an employee-owned publishing company located in Orland Park, Illinois. ATP publishes training materials for career and technical education, industrial training, and apprenticeship programs. It is the only employee-owned career and technical publisher in the country.

== History ==
ATP was founded in 1898 by R. T. Miller, Jr. as the American Technical Society (ATS). The ATS published instructional materials for the American School of Correspondence, which was also founded by Miller. In 1902, Miller moved both companies from Boston to Chicago. Today, the building that housed both companies is recognized as a Chicago landmark.

During World War II, the ATS changed its primary publishing material to vocational training materials for preparation of industrial workers for the war effort. In the early 1960s, the Vocational Education Act of 1963 and subsequent appropriations provided increased federal funding for the expansion of vocational education programs. This act allowed companies, such as the ATS, to develop new training materials for vocational studies.

In March 1980, the company American Technical Publishers, Inc. Profit Sharing Retirement Plan and Trust purchased the assets of the Society. The Society then became known as the Technical Foundation of America, and ATP became its own company. The current President is Robert D. Deisinger.

== The ATP Building ==
An exterior shot of the LEED-Certified ATP Building.

In November 2008, ATP opened its new headquarters building in Orland Park, Illinois. In order to reduce the harmful effects a building can have on the environment, the ATP Building was constructed as a sustainable green building, conforming to the established LEED requirements. The building was built by Morgan/Harbour Construction and has earned LEED Gold Certification from the U.S. Green Building Council. Some of its green features include sunshades on exterior windows and raised flooring. The sunshades on the exterior windows reduce the amount of energy needed to warm and cool the office by offering a natural way to control temperature. The raised flooring also reduces energy by minimizing the amount of ductwork.

In October 2010, the Economic Development Council for the Southwest Suburbs, an organization affiliated with the Workforce Development and Community Services department at Moraine Valley Community College, presented ATP with the Sustainability Award for its new building and commitment to sustainable practices.

== Products ==
ATP publishes career and technical (formally vocational) training materials for a variety of fields, such as electrical, construction, welding, culinary, CAD and technical drawing, and boiler operations. Materials include textbooks, workbooks, instructor resource guides, and digital media.
