= ATP (treaty) =

1970 United Nations treaty

ATP (formally, the Agreement on the International Carriage of Perishable Foodstuffs and on the Special Equipment to be used for such Carriage (ATP)) is a 1970 United Nations treaty that establishes standards for the international transport of perishable food between the states that ratify the treaty. It has been updated through amendment a number of times and as of 2016 has 50 state parties, most of which are in Europe or Central Asia. It is open to ratification by states that are members of the United Nations Economic Commission for Europe (UNECE) and states that otherwise participate in UNECE activities. "ATP" is derived from the French name of the treaty: Accord relatif aux transports internationaux de denrées périssables et aux engins spéciaux à utiliser pour ces transports.

ATP was concluded in Geneva on 1 September 1970 under the aegis of the UNECE. It was signed by Austria, West Germany, Italy, Luxembourg, Netherlands, Portugal, and Switzerland. The treaty entered into force on 21 November 1976 after it had been ratified by five states. ATP was intended to replace the Agreement on Special Equipment for the Transport of Perishable Foodstuffs and on the Use of such Equipment for the International Transport of some of those Foodstuffs, which was concluded in 1962 but never received enough ratifications to enter into force.

ATP mandates that certain types of equipment be used to transport perishable food across borders and that such equipment will be regularly inspected. (For instance, equipment may need to be refrigerated, heated, or insulated.) ATP applies to transport by road and by rail, but it does not apply to transport within the borders of a single country.

As of 2016, the following 50 states are party to ATP:

- Albania
- Andorra
- Austria
- Azerbaijan
- Belarus
- Belgium
- Bosnia and Herzegovina
- Bulgaria
- Croatia
- Czech Republic
- Denmark
- Estonia
- Finland
- France
- Georgia
- Germany
- Greece
- Hungary
- Ireland
- Italy
- Kazakhstan
- Kyrgyzstan
- Latvia
- Lithuania
- Luxembourg
- Republic of Macedonia
- Moldova
- Monaco
- Montenegro
- Morocco
- Netherlands
- Norway
- Poland
- Portugal
- Romania
- Russia
- San Marino
- Saudi Arabia
- Serbia
- Slovakia
- Slovenia
- Spain
- Sweden
- Tajikistan
- Tunisia
- Turkey
- Ukraine
- United Kingdom
- United States
- Uzbekistan

Former state parties are Czechoslovakia, East Germany, and Yugoslavia. Russia ratified as the Soviet Union and Serbia ratified as the Federal Republic of Yugoslavia. Switzerland signed the agreement but has not ratified it.
