= Advanced Technology Program =

The NIST Advanced Technology Program (ATP, or NIST ATP) is a United States government (U.S. Department of Commerce, National Institute of Standards and Technology) program designed to stimulate early-stage advanced technology development that would otherwise not be funded.

ATP is designed for early-stage research in industry, not academia, though it supports academia indirectly (as subcontractors or collaborators in projects). It was started under the administration of U.S. President George H. W. Bush in 1991 with special legislation enacted and implemented by the administration of President Bill Clinton in the Code of Federal Regulations Title 15, Volume 1, Parts 0 to 299. Starting in 1995, the Republican-led Congress, as well as the administration of President George W. Bush, repeatedly recommended its termination and the program was suspended in 2005 with the White House working with the Administration and Congress to terminate this program. This was completed on August 9, 2007, when the president signed the America COMPETES Act (H.R. 2272; Public Law Number 110-69), which repealed the Advanced Technology Program-enabling legislation.

== Technology Innovation Program ==
A new successor program called the NIST Technology Innovation Program (TIP) was enacted. TIP was established to assist U.S. businesses and institutions of higher education or other organizations, such as national laboratories and nonprofit research institutes, to support, promote, and accelerate innovation in the United States through high-risk, high-reward research in areas of critical national need.

TIP aims to speed up the development of new research that addresses specific national problems. Funding is provided to industry (small and medium-sized businesses), universities, and consortia for research on new technologies for solving critical national problems that present high technical risks, with commensurate high rewards if successful. The primary mechanism for this support is cost-shared research grants, cooperative agreements, or contracts awarded based on merit competitions.

=== Features ===
The major features of the Technology Innovation Program are established in the authorizing legislation. These include:

- TIP makes cost-shared awards of no more than 50 percent of total project costs to high-risk R&D projects that address critical national and societal needs in NIST's areas of technical competence.
- Projects may be proposed either by individual, for-profit companies or by joint ventures that may include for-profit companies, institutions of higher learning, national laboratories, or non-profit research institutes, so long as the lead partner is either a small or medium-sized business or an institution of higher learning.
- Awards are limited to no more than $3 million total over three years for a single-company project or no more than $9 million total over five years for a joint venture.
- TIP may not provide funding to any business that is not a small- or medium-sized business, though those businesses may participate in a TIP-funded project.

=== Shutdown ===
"On November 18, 2011, President Obama signed the "Consolidated and Further Continuing Appropriations Act, 2012," which provided FY 2012 full-year appropriations through September 30, 2012, for the Department of Commerce. This bill included National Institute of Standards and Technology (NIST) appropriations. However, funds need to be appropriated for the Technology Innovation Program. The Program is currently taking the necessary actions for an orderly shutdown.

== Bibliography ==
- P.L.110-69, Sec. 3012 Technology Innovation Program, legislation authorizing the Technology Innovation Program
