= National Amalgamated Association of Tin Plate Workers of Great Britain =

The National Amalgamated Association of Tin Plate Workers of Great Britain was a trade union representing sheet metal workers in the United Kingdom.

The union was founded in 1876 in Wolverhampton, when the Wolverhampton Tin Plate Workers' Society merged with the Birmingham Tin Plate Workers' Society, forming the Amalgamated Tin Plate Workers' Society of Birmingham, Wolverhampton and District. Membership was one shilling, and workers involved in strikes or lockouts received 8 shillings per week for up to 20 weeks. Initially, the one district appointed the secretary and the other the president, with the two swapping every three years. This arrangement continued until 1889, when the United Tin Plate Workers' Association and the Gas Meter Makers' Association of Edinburgh and Leith merged into the union, which took its final name. Membership at this time was still only 1,400, but the growth led to increased confidence, and the union affiliated to the Trades Union Congress.

The union continued to grow, with societies based in Aberdeen, Bradford, Bristol, Exeter, Halesowen, Leeds, London, Lowestoft, Norwich and Oldham also joining - by 1902, all the local tin plate workers' unions had affiliated, and membership had reached 6,261. J. C. Gordon was appointed as the union's first full-time general secretary. However, in 1909, the Birmingham branch left following a disagreement about payments to members involved in disputes, forming the Birmingham and Midland Sheet Metal Workers' Society.

In 1920, the union merged into the National Union of Sheet Metal Workers and Braziers.

== Secretaries ==
1876: Edward Davies
1879: H. Rickett
1882: John Deans
1886: John Valentine Stevens
1902: Charles Gordon
