= Harrington Emerson =

American efficiency engineer and business theorist

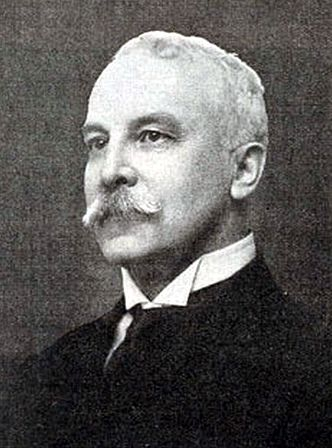
- Born: August 2, 1853; Trenton, New Jersey
- Died: September 2, 1931 (aged 78)
- Education: Technical University of Munich
- Spouse: Mary Crawford Suplee
- Children: Louise Emerson Ronnebeck
- Parent(s): Edwin Emerson, Maria Louisa Ingham
- Engineering career
- Discipline: Efficiency engineering, Mechanical engineering
- Institutions: American Society of Mechanical Engineers
- Employers: University of Nebraska; Electric Storage Battery Company
- Projects: Emerson Institute, New York; Scientific management

Harrington Emerson (August 2, 1853 – September 2, 1931) was an American efficiency engineer and business theorist, who founded the management consultancy firm Emerson Institute in New York City in 1900. Known for his pioneering contributions to scientific management, Emerson may have done more than anyone else to popularize the topic: His public testimony in 1910 to the Interstate Commerce Commission that the railroads could save $1,000,000 a day started a nationwide interest in the subject of "efficiency".

== Biography ==
Emerson was born in Trenton, New Jersey to Edwin Emerson, a Professor of Political science, and Mary Louisa (Ingham) Emerson, daughter of Samuel D. Ingham, a U.S. Congressman and U.S. Treasury Secretary under President Andrew Jackson. Emerson attended private schools in Europe, and from 1872 to 1875 studied engineering at the Technical University of Munich.

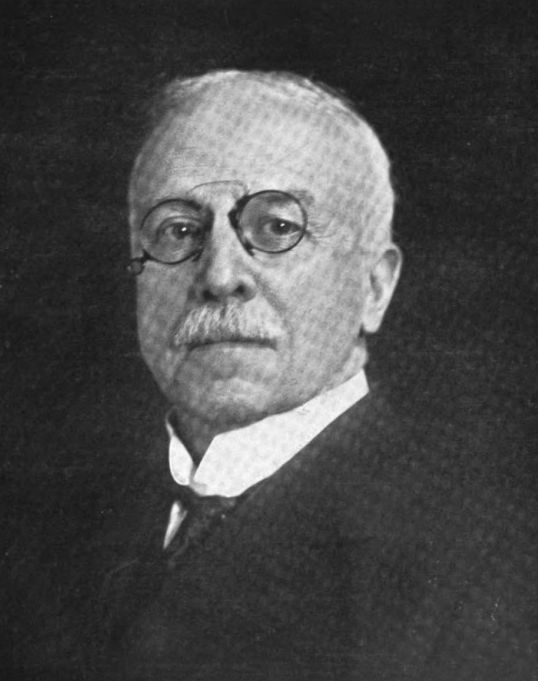
Emerson, 1916

After returning to the United States in 1876, Emerson was appointed as Professor of Modern Languages at the University of Nebraska, where he was dismissed in 1882 because of his progressive educational ideas. In the years after, Harrington had several jobs, including a frontier banker, land speculator, tax agent, troubleshooter, lecturer, and educator. In 1893, he joined William Jennings Bryan's campaign for the presidential election of 1896, which created the foundation for his career as efficiency engineer.

In 1897, Emerson started focusing on mechanical engineering, and was employed shortly after by the Electric Storage Battery Company in New York. After his new projects during the Alaskan Gold Rush failed, he became the general manager in a small glass factory. In 1900, he established the Emerson Institute in New York City in order to focus on his work as efficiency engineer. Through the American Society of Mechanical Engineers, he got acquainted with the work of Frederick W. Taylor, which he implemented in his own praxis.

Emerson was married to Mary Crawford Suplee, and the youngest of their three daughters was the American painter Louise Emerson Ronnebeck (1901 – 1980).

== Work ==
=== The ideal of setting up of standards ===
Emerson had spent his youth in Europe. It was to French character, and to German military efficiency as evidenced before his eyes in the conduct of the Franco-Prussian War, that Emerson attributes his strongest ideal — the setting up of standards. His admiration for systematic method and perfect cooperation was further strengthened by studies under a European music teacher (a musician from the royal orchestra), by observation of the remarkable results obtained by breeders of fine horses, and by contact with A. B. Smith, a skilful railroad surveyor.

=== Earlier efforts in the field of systematizing management ===
Emerson's earlier efforts in the field of systematizing management were in organizing and standardizing one of the new western state universities, the University of Nebraska–Lincoln, of which for six years he was registrar, secretary of the faculty, and head of a department. It was not until some years after this that he entered the profession of reorganizing industrial plants.

In 1895 he began a rapid survey of these, determining what their product and costs were compared to what they ought to be. In 1900 or 1902, he checked up minutely the losses occurring in the use of materials, while planning, scheduling, and dispatching work through a large factory.

Of all Emerson's undertakings, however, that which has attracted the most attention was his "betterment work" introduced into the shops of the Santa Fe Railway during three years beginning in 1904. He has installed his system partially, though in no instance completely, in some 200 different plants from Alaska to Mexico, from Louisiana to Canada, from Southern California to Maine. These activities were carried on through the Emerson Company, which late 1910s employs between forty and fifty efficiency specialists.

=== Betterment work ===
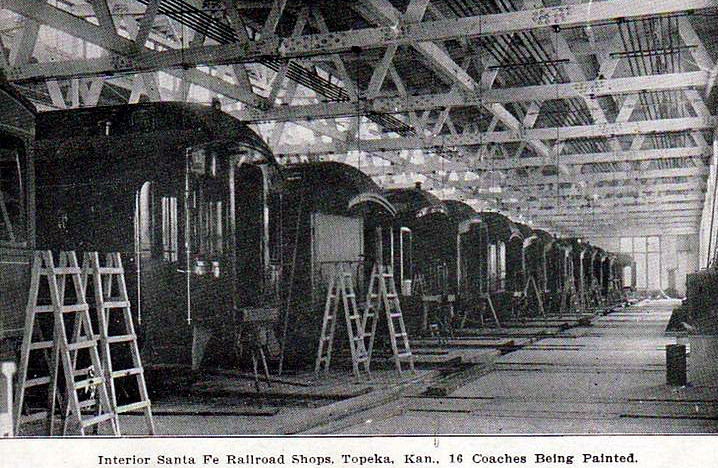
Santa Fe shop, Topeka, Kansas painting cars around 1900-1930.

In May, 1904, because of labor troubles, Harrington Emerson was given the task of reorganizing certain features of the Santa Fe railway system. His authority extended only to that one department known as the motive power department; and he was, therefore, concerned mainly with the maintenance and repair of locomotives, much of which work was centralized in shops at Topeka. Nevertheless, by the time Emerson had worked out from Topeka to the end of the 10,000 or so miles of road, his system was affecting 12,000 men, and he had a task upon his hands which took three years of time, and the assistance of a large staff of railway experts.

The cause of starting Emerson's "betterment work" as it was officially called, having been a strike, his first and most important aim was to establish a basis for permanent harmony by introducing an "individual effort and bonus system." Increased supervision of the men was to be undertaken, and for good work special rewards were to be given. Accordingly, time studies were made (about 60,000 by March, 1907), tasks were set, and bonuses offered. There were several distinguishing features which marked this phase of scientific management as it was introduced on the Santa Fe:

- First, extreme emphasis was laid on the individual character of the relations of men and management: "The schedule is a moral contract or agreement with the men as to a particular machine operation, rate of wages and time. Any change in men [etc.] calls for a new schedule."
- Second, there was a lack of insistence on the selection of unusual men: "The standard time set is reasonable, and one that can be reached without extraordinary effort; is, in fact, such time as a good foreman would demand."
- And third, bonuses were paid to foremen. Thus the Santa Fe management sought to make of its employees industrious, well paid, and loyal workmen.

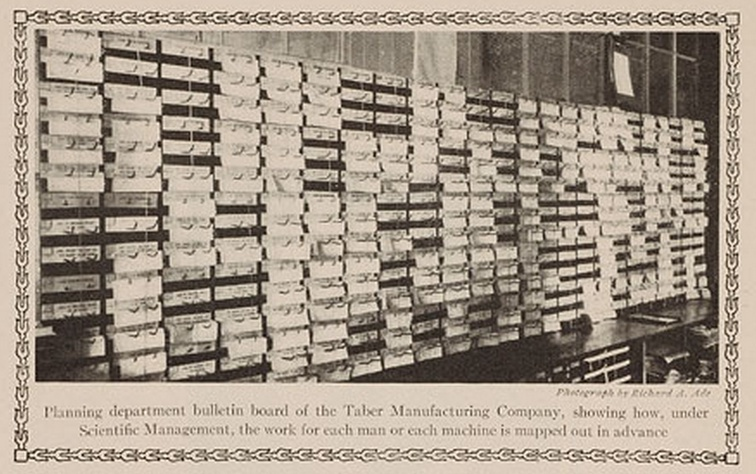
Planning department bulletin, showing how, under Scientific Management, the work for each man or each machine is mapped out in advance, 1911.

But before actually setting tasks, it was necessary to study and standardize all tools and equipment, and this led in itself to important improvements. Specially notable was the improvement in the care of belting, this being taken out of the hands of the workmen and put into those of specialists, with a resulting saving of 70 per cent in the expense of belt maintenance. Perhaps the most interesting features which Emerson introduced were the various routing and scheduling devices. All of the work in the machine shop was so arranged that it could be controlled from dispatch boards located in a central office; likewise on a bulletin board was indicated the progress in the repair of each locomotive. Most of the other changes — such as the centralization of work at Topeka, and the introduction of improved methods of cost accounting — are beyond the pale of things which are distinctively "scientific management."

It is agreed that the principles of scientific management were only part of them introduced on the Santa Fe. Nevertheless, the estimated savings were at the time put at enormous figures. Thus in the article from which the above quotations were taken, its writer estimated from figures contained in the president's annual report that during the fiscal year ending June 30, 1906, fully a million and half quarter of dollars were saved. Other critics were equally enthusiastic, and the work attracted a great deal of attention throughout the country.

=== Emerson's system of efficiency and scientific management ===
Emerson distinguished his system from scientific management based on three characteristics:

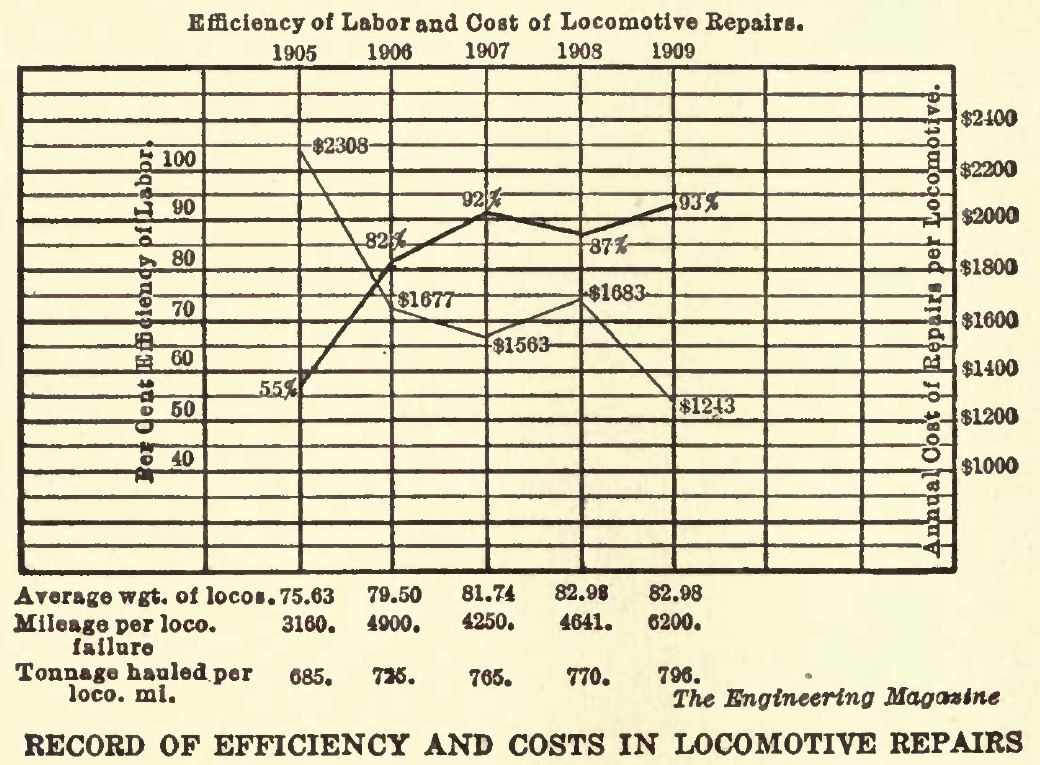
Record of efficiency and costs in locomotive repairs by Emerson, 1912

1. He calls his system "efficiency" rather than "scientific management."
2. He opposed functional management with its numerous heads, and substitutes for it the "line and staff" idea, under which there is but one boss (the line). The functional experts (or staff) whom Emerson employs are not executive officers, but simply advise the single responsible authority; and it is the latter who puts all plans into practice through command over his "line" subordinates. The idea is to avoid creating too many bosses, and yet operate under expert advice.
3. Emerson uses a wage system which bases remuneration partly upon the "efficiency per cent" of the employee. Standard times are set on the basis of time study analysis, and the workman who just completes the same in the allotted time is credited with 100 per cent efficiency.

Efficiency may thus be reckoned as below, above, or at 100 per cent. Although everyone receives his day rate, which is supposed to be a normal compensation when compared with prevailing wages, a man who cannot attain 66.7 per cent efficiency in the long run is regarded as subnormal and is in danger of discharge. At 67 per cent a small bonus is paid, which grows in size until at 90 per cent efficiency it reaches 10 per cent. Above this point one per cent in bonus is added for each additional one per cent gain in efficiency.

Emerson has thus developed a wage system which is in its results practically the same as Gantt's "task and bonus" plan, except that under the Gantt system no bonus is paid until a man comes up to standard performance, in the hope that the large increase then suddenly granted will bring all up to a common productivity.

=== Emerson and Frederick W. Taylor ===
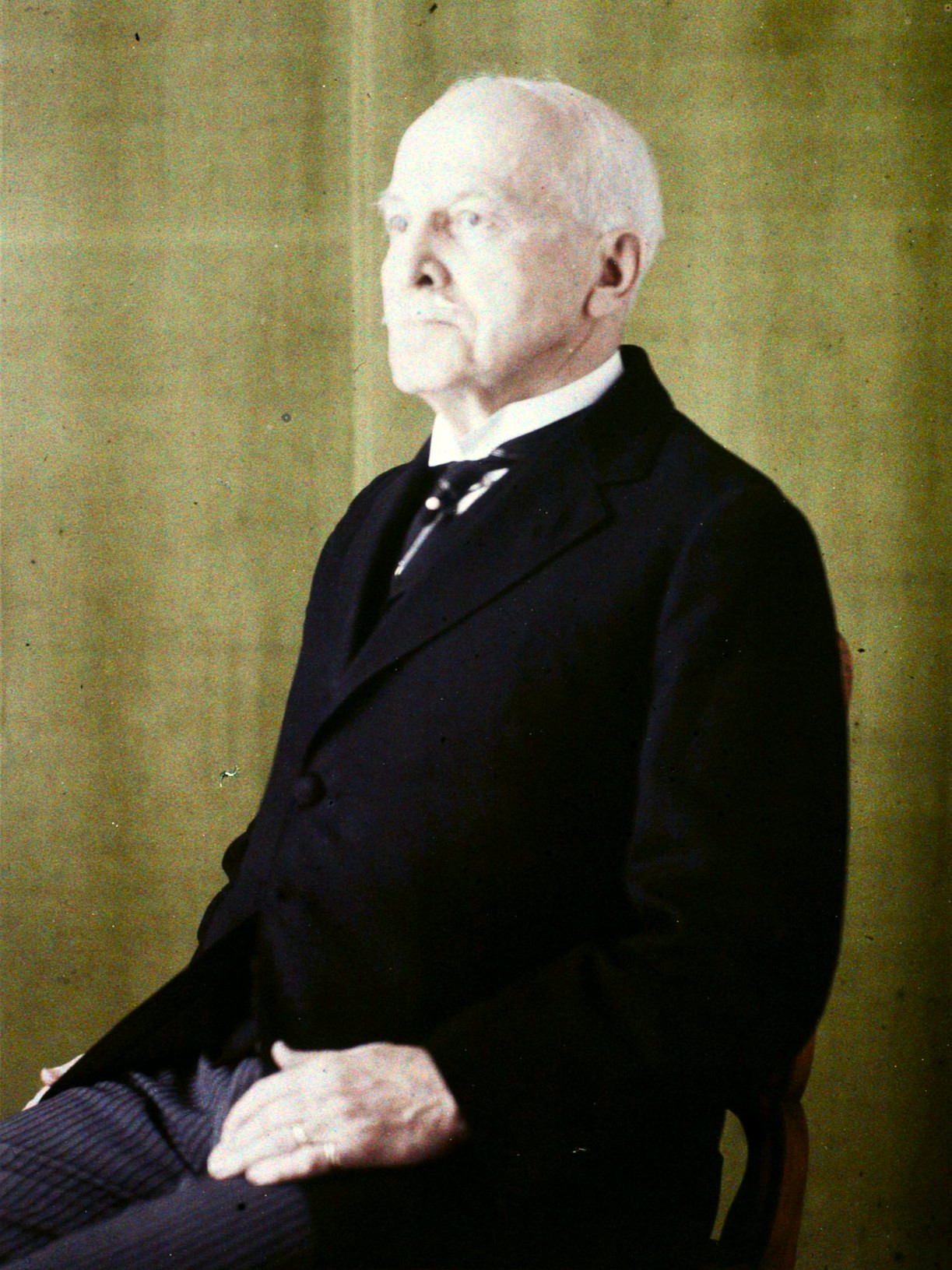
Emerson in a 1929 Autochrome by Georges Chevalier

Emerson was nearly three years older than Frederick W. Taylor; he did not meet the latter until December, 1900, and the two never worked together. Emerson was present, however, when Taylor's "Shop Management" was read, in 1903, and did almost all of his mature work in the light (if he chose to use it) of that exposition.

In regard to his general thought, Emerson has received stimuli from many sources; but as concerns the application of efficiency to industrial plants, there is good ground for believing that he is much more deeply indebted to Taylor than to any other. Indeed, men well acquainted with both have told us that Emerson was once accustomed to refer to Taylor as the source of his ideas: Taylor he regarded as trying to do too much, as being in advance of his time; it was he, Emerson, who, by rendering lofty projects more practical, was able to achieve results.

On the other hand, it cannot be denied that Emerson has brought into the field a great deal of original force. He may have adopted some of Taylor's ideas; but if so, his conduct is similar to the appropriation which every man makes of any scheme that appeals to him as useful; and beyond this, he has at the same time combined them with so many ideas derived from other sources that his resulting philosophical system is a truly original contribution to the subject. Certainly in his books he has expressed himself in a way which is in many respects far more effective than the style of the other scientific management or efficiency men.

== Reception ==
According to Drury (1918) Emerson has done more than any other single man to popularize the subject of scientific management. His statement that the railroads could save $1,000,000 a day by introducing efficiency methods was the keynote which started the nationwide interest in the subject. His books, Efficiency (a reprint in 1911 of periodical contributions of 1908 and 1909), and The Twelve Principles of Efficiency (1912), taken with his magazine articles and addresses, have perhaps done more than anything else to make "efficiency" a household word.

In "A short history of efficiency" Witzel (2002) summarized Emerson's role and ideas. He stated, that Emerson had "argued that an efficient organisation was a necessary prerequisite to task and process efficiency. Rejecting the machine metaphor of scientific management, Emerson conceived of an organic organisation where efficiency was a natural occurrence, not an imposed set of targets and procedures - a concept that has a lot in common with total quality management and a management philosophy that remains valid and important."

== Publications ==
- Emerson, Harrington. The engineer and the road to the gold fields 1899
- Emerson, Harrington. Efficiency as a Basis for Operation and Wages. Engineering Magazine, 1909.
- Emerson, Harrington. The twelve principles of efficiency. Engineering Magazine, 1912.
- Emerson, Harrington. In memoriam to those who perished in the disaster to the Titanic April 14th and 15th, 1912 : an address to the Club of Printing House Craftsmen of New York, delivered April 18th, at the hour of the landing of the survivors. New York : Emerson. 1912
- Emerson, Harrington. The railroad situation; why 30 per cent rate increase is not enough. New York, The Emerson Engineers. 1920

Articles, a selection

- Harrison Emerson (1905) "Shop betterment and the individual effort method of profit-sharing" in: International Railway Journal Vol. 13. p. 61.
