= Tony Cooper (trade unionist) =

British trade union leader

Derek Anthony Cooper (born 11 December 1943), known as Tony Cooper, is a former British trade union leader.

== Early life ==
Cooper was educated at Whitehaven Grammar School and the University of Edinburgh.

== Career ==
He worked for the Forestry Commission. In 1976, he switched careers, becoming a negotiations officer with the Institution of Professional Civil Servants (IPCS). Three years later, he became an assistant secretary of the union, then Assistant General Secretary in 1982, and Deputy General Secretary in 1987.

In 1991, Cooper was elected as General Secretary of the rival Engineers' and Managers' Association. However, he remained keen to build links between it and the IPMS, leading in 2001 to the two unions merging to form Prospect, of which Cooper served as Joint General Secretary for the first year. He also served on the General Council of the Trades Union Congress from 1997 to 2000.

Cooper served on a large number of committees, including the Nuclear Decommissioning Authority, Postal Services Commission and the Forestry Commission, the Government Energy Advisory Panel, and the European Union Energy Consultative, Strategy and Investment Committees. He retired from the last of his posts in 2015.

== Personal life ==
Cooper's daughter, Yvette Cooper, is a Labour Party Member of Parliament, currently serving as Health Secretary and previously as Foreign Secretary and Home Secretary.

Trade union offices
Preceded by John Lyons	General Secretary of the Engineers' and Managers' Association; 1991 – 2001	Succeeded by Position abolished
Preceded by New position	General Secretary of Prospect; 2001 – 2002; With: Paul Noon	Succeeded by Paul Noon
