= Yvette Cooper =

British politician (born 1969)

The Right Honourable Yvette Cooper MP
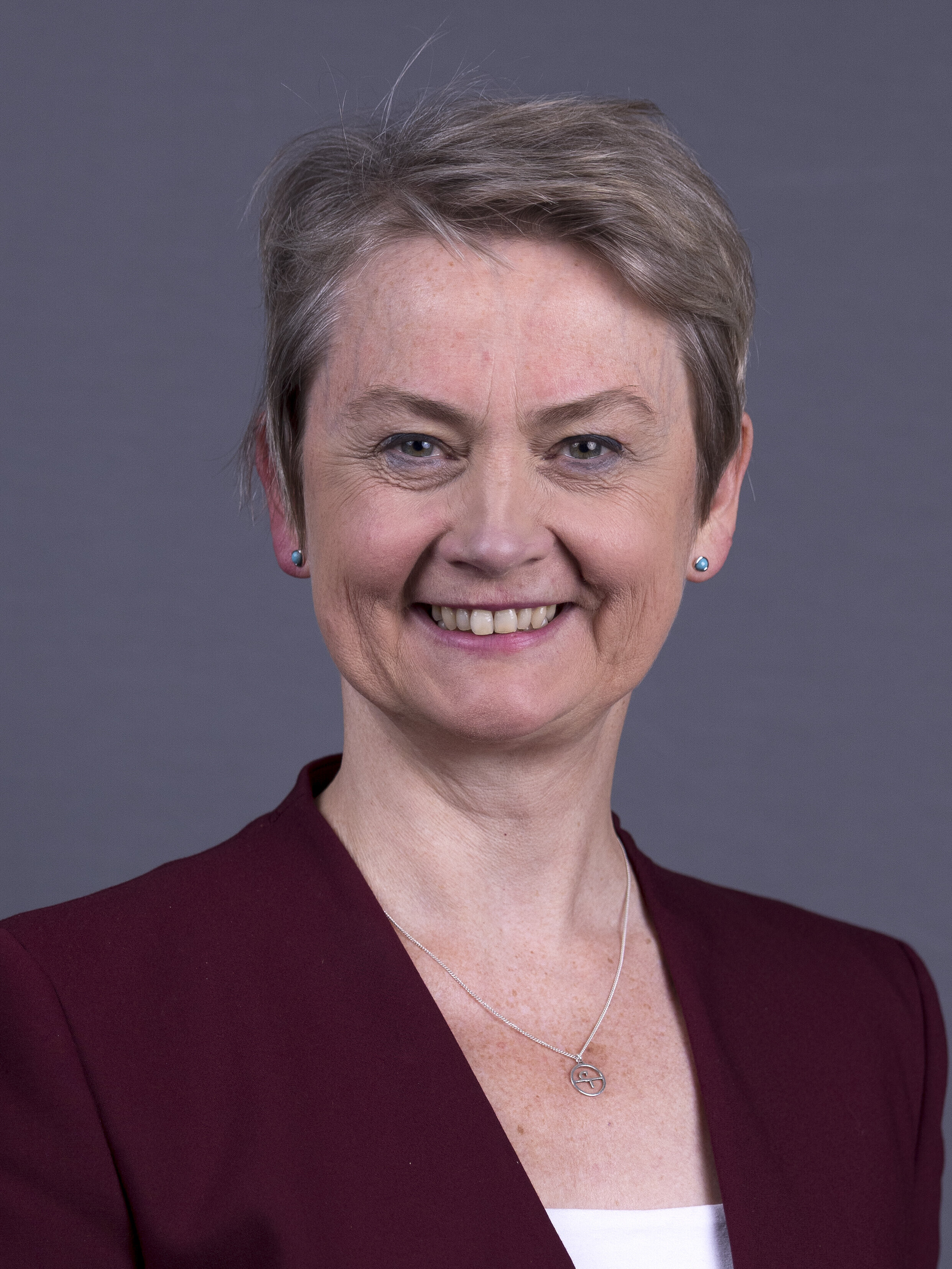
- Official portrait, 2025

Secretary of State for Health and Social Care
- Incumbent
- Assumed office 20 July 2026
- Prime Minister: Andy Burnham
- Preceded by: James Murray

Foreign Secretary
- In office 5 September 2025 – 20 July 2026
- Prime Minister: Keir Starmer
- Preceded by: David Lammy
- Succeeded by: Ed Miliband

Home Secretary
- In office 5 July 2024 – 5 September 2025
- Prime Minister: Keir Starmer
- Preceded by: James Cleverly
- Succeeded by: Shabana Mahmood
Cabinet level offices 2008‍–‍2010
Secretary of State for Work and Pensions
In office 5 June 2009 – 11 May 2010
Prime Minister	Gordon Brown
Preceded by	James Purnell
Succeeded by	Iain Duncan Smith
Chief Secretary to the Treasury
In office 24 January 2008 – 5 June 2009
Prime Minister	Gordon Brown
Chancellor	Alistair Darling
Preceded by	Andy Burnham
Succeeded by	Liam Byrne
Junior ministerial offices
Minister of State for Housing and Planning
In office 10 May 2005 – 24 January 2008
Prime Minister	Tony Blair; Gordon Brown
Preceded by	Keith Hill
Succeeded by	Caroline Flint
Parliamentary Under-Secretary of State for Regeneration and Regional Development
In office 13 June 2003 – 10 May 2005
Prime Minister	Tony Blair
Preceded by	Chris Leslie
Succeeded by	The Baroness Andrews
Parliamentary Secretary to the Lord Chancellor's Department
In office 29 May 2002 – 12 June 2003
Prime Minister	Tony Blair
Preceded by	Michael Wills
Succeeded by	Office abolished
Parliamentary Under-Secretary of State for Health
In office 11 October 1999 – 29 May 2002
Prime Minister	Tony Blair
Preceded by	Tessa Jowell
Succeeded by	David Lammy
Shadow cabinet portfolios
2011–2015; 2021–2024	Home Department
2010–2013	Women and Equalities
2010–2011	Foreign and Commonwealth Affairs
2010–2010	Work and Pensions
Further offices held
Chair of the Home Affairs Select Committee
In office 19 October 2016 – 1 December 2021
Preceded by	Keith Vaz
Succeeded by	Diana Johnson

Member of Parliament
- Incumbent
- Assumed office 1 May 1997
- Preceded by: Geoffrey Lofthouse
- Constituency: Pontefract and Castleford (1997–2010); Normanton, Pontefract and Castleford (2010–2024); Pontefract, Castleford and Knottingley (2024–present)
- Majority: 6,630 (18.4%)

Personal details
- Born: 20 March 1969 (age 57) Inverness, Scotland
- Party: Labour
- Spouse: Ed Balls (m. 1998)
- Children: 3
- Parent: Tony Cooper (father)
- Education: Balliol College, Oxford (BA); London School of Economics (MSc)
- Website: www.yvettecooper.com
- Yvette Cooper's voice Cooper delivering an Amnesty International lecture on the refugee crisis in 2016

Yvette Cooper (born 20 March 1969) is a British politician who has served as Secretary of State for Health and Social Care since July 2026. She previously served as Foreign Secretary from September 2025 to July 2026 and as Home Secretary from 2024 to 2025. A member of the Labour Party, Cooper has been the Member of Parliament (MP) for Pontefract, Castleford and Knottingley, formerly Normanton, Pontefract and Castleford, since 1997. She previously held various ministerial positions under Tony Blair and Gordon Brown from 1999 to 2010, lastly as Secretary of State for Work and Pensions from 2009 to 2010.

Born in Inverness, Cooper is the daughter of trade union leader Tony Cooper. She first attended Eggar's School and was later educated at Alton College. She studied philosophy, politics and economics (PPE) at Balliol College, Oxford and then won a Kennedy Scholarship in 1991 to study at Harvard University. She completed her postgraduate studies with an MSc degree in economics at the London School of Economics. Cooper began her career as an economic policy researcher for Shadow Chancellor John Smith, later working for Democratic presidential nominee Bill Clinton and shadow cabinet minister Harriet Harman. She later worked for the Centre for Economic Performance, before she became the chief economics correspondent of The Independent in 1995. Having been elected to Parliament at the 1997 general election, Cooper was a Parliamentary under-secretary of state in three departments under Prime Minister Tony Blair from 1999 to 2005. She was promoted to Minister of State for Housing and Planning in 2005, and was invited to attend Cabinet in the role when Gordon Brown was appointed prime minister in 2007.

Cooper continued to serve in Brown's Cabinet as Chief Secretary to the Treasury from 2008 to 2009 and then as Secretary of State for Work and Pensions from 2009 to 2010. Following Labour's defeat at the 2010 general election, she served in Ed Miliband's Shadow Cabinet as Shadow Foreign Secretary from 2010 to 2011. In 2011, her husband Ed Balls was promoted to Shadow Chancellor of the Exchequer; she replaced Balls as shadow home secretary and served until Labour lost the 2015 general election. In May 2015, Cooper announced she would run to be Leader of the Labour Party in the leadership election following the resignation of Miliband. She came third with 17.0% of the vote in the first round, losing to Jeremy Corbyn. She subsequently resigned as Shadow Home Secretary in September 2015. Cooper was the chair of the Home Affairs Select Committee from 2016 to 2021. As a backbencher, she repeatedly sought to extend Article 50 to delay Brexit. After six years on the backbenches, Cooper returned as shadow home secretary under Keir Starmer in a November 2021 shadow cabinet reshuffle.

Following Labour's victory in the 2024 general election, Cooper returned to government and was appointed home secretary by Starmer in his ministry. She faced her first major domestic event, the riots across the country following the Southport stabbing, three weeks into her tenure. As home secretary, she oversaw the establishment of the Border Security Command and the proscription of Palestine Action as a terrorist organisation. Cooper was later appointed Foreign Secretary during the 2025 cabinet reshuffle, becoming the first woman to have served in both roles. During her tenure as foreign secretary, the government formally recognised the state of Palestine and refused to participate in the initial offensive strikes during the 2026 Iran war. Cooper endorsed Andy Burnham in the 2026 leadership election and was subsequently appointed Health Secretary in the Burnham ministry.

== Early life and education ==
Yvette Cooper was born on 20 March 1969 in Inverness, Scotland. Her father is Tony Cooper, former general secretary of the Prospect trade union, a former non-executive director of the Nuclear Decommissioning Authority and a former chairman of the British Nuclear Industry Forum. He was also a government adviser on the Energy Advisory Panel. Her mother, June, was a maths teacher.

She was educated at Eggar's School, a comprehensive school in Holybourne, and Alton College, both in Alton, Hampshire. She read philosophy, politics and economics (PPE) at Balliol College, Oxford, and graduated with a first-class honours BA degree. She won a Kennedy Scholarship in 1991 to study at Harvard University, and completed her postgraduate studies with an MSc degree in economics at the London School of Economics.

== Early career ==
Cooper began her career as an economic policy researcher for Shadow Chancellor John Smith in 1990 before working in Arkansas for Bill Clinton, nominee of the Democratic Party for President of the United States, in 1992. Later that year, she became a policy adviser to the then Shadow Chief Secretary to the Treasury, Harriet Harman.

At the age of 24, Cooper developed chronic fatigue syndrome, from which she took a year to recover. In 1994, she moved to become a research associate at the Centre for Economic Performance. In 1995, she became the chief economics correspondent of The Independent, remaining with the newspaper until her election to the House of Commons in 1997.

== Parliamentary career ==
Cooper was selected as the Labour candidate to contest Pontefract and Castleford at the 1997 general election. She was elected as MP for Pontefract and Castleford with 75.7% of the vote and a majority of 25,725. Cooper made her maiden speech in the Commons on 2 July 1997, speaking about her constituency's struggle with unemployment. She served for two years on the Education and Employment Select Committee.

=== Blair and Brown government (1999–2010) ===
In 1999, she was promoted as Parliamentary under-secretary of state at the Department of Health. As a health minister, Cooper helped implement the Sure Start programme. In this post, she was also the first British government minister in history to take maternity leave.

At the 2001 general election, Cooper was re-elected as MP for Pontefract and Castleford with a decreased vote share of 69.7% and a decreased majority of 16,378.

In 2003, she became Parliamentary Under-Secretary for Regeneration in the Office of the Deputy Prime Minister with the responsibility of coalfield regeneration. Following the 2005 general election she was promoted to Minister, as Minister of State for Housing and Planning based in the Department for Communities and Local Government from 2006.

Cooper was again re-elected at the 2005 general election with a decreased vote share of 63.7% and a decreased majority of 15,246.

After Gordon Brown became prime minister, Cooper was invited to attend cabinet meetings as Housing Minister. Shortly after taking the job, she was required to introduce the Home Information Pack (HIPs) scheme. According to Conservative columnist Matthew Parris, Cooper conceived HIPs, but avoided direct criticism for its problems because of her connection with Brown. In July 2007, Cooper announced in the House of Commons that "unless we act now, by 2026 first-time buyers will find average house prices are ten times their salary. That could lead to real social inequality and injustice. Every part of the country needs more affordable homes – in the North and the South, in urban and rural communities".

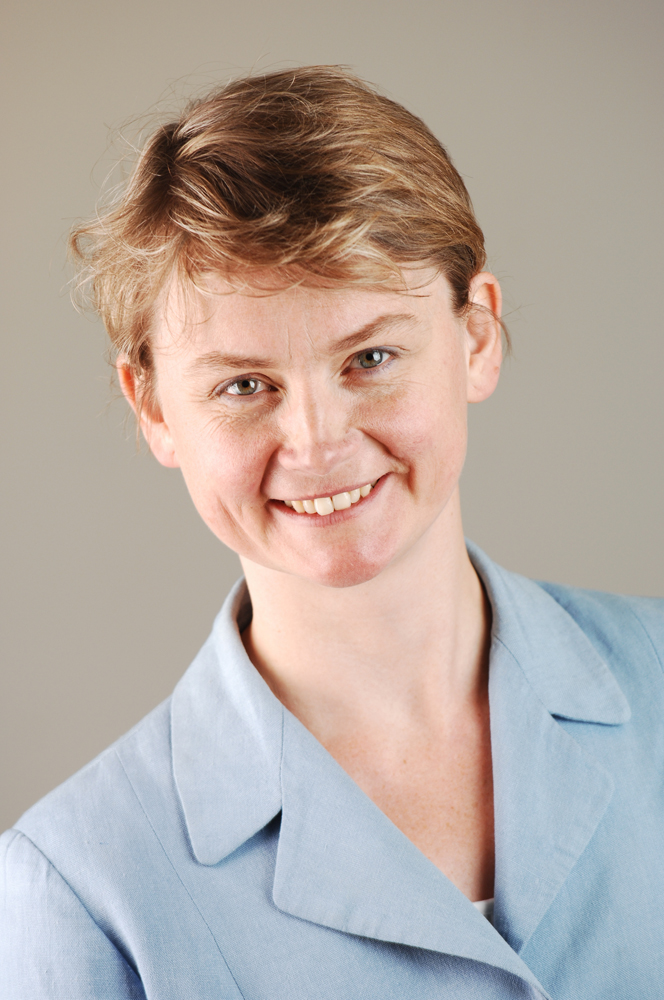
Cooper as Minister for Housing in 2007

In 2008, Cooper became the first woman to serve as Chief Secretary to the Treasury where she was involved with taking Northern Rock into public ownership. As her husband, Ed Balls, was already a cabinet minister, her promotion meant that the two became the first married couple ever to sit in the cabinet together.

In 2009, Cooper was appointed as Secretary of State for Work and Pensions and took over leading on the Welfare Reform Act 2009 which included measures to extend the use of benefit sanctions to force unemployed people to seek work. Many campaigners – including the Child Poverty Action Group (CPAG) – urged Cooper to rethink Labour's approach, arguing instead that increasing support for job seekers was vital to eradicating child poverty.

==== Allegations over expenses ====
In May 2009, The Daily Telegraph reported that Cooper had changed the designation of her second home twice in two years. Following a referral to the parliamentary standards watchdog, Cooper and her husband Ed Balls were exonerated by John Lyon, the Standards Commissioner. He said they had paid capital gains tax on their homes and were not motivated by profit. Cooper and Balls bought a four-bedroom house in Stoke Newington, North London, and registered this as their second home (rather than their home in Castleford, West Yorkshire); this qualified them for up to £44,000 a year to subsidise a reported £438,000 mortgage under the Commons Additional Costs Allowance, of which they claimed £24,400. An investigation in MPs' expenses by Sir Thomas Legg found that Cooper and her husband had both received overpayments of £1,363 in relation to their mortgage. He ordered them to repay the money.

=== Miliband Shadow Cabinet (2010–2015) ===
Prior to the 2010 general election, Cooper's constituency of Pontefract and Castleford was abolished, and replaced with Normanton, Pontefract, and Castleford. At the election, Cooper was elected as MP for Normanton, Pontefract, and Castleford with 48.1% of the vote and a majority of 10,979. Following Labour's defeat at the general election, Cooper and her husband Ed Balls were both mentioned in the press as a potential leadership candidates when Gordon Brown resigned as Leader of the Labour Party.

Before Balls announced his candidacy, he offered to stand aside if Cooper wanted to stand, but Cooper declined for the sake of their children, stating that it would not be the right time for her. She later topped the 2010 ballot for places in the Shadow cabinet, and there was speculation that the newly elected Labour Leader Ed Miliband would appoint her Shadow Chancellor of the Exchequer. She instead became Shadow Foreign Secretary.

When Alan Johnson resigned as Shadow Chancellor on 20 January 2011, Cooper was appointed Shadow Home Secretary. Her husband, Ed Balls, replaced Johnson as Shadow Chancellor. Cooper also served as Shadow Minister for Women and Equalities from October 2010 to October 2013.

==== Shadow home secretary (2011–2015) ====
On 20 January 2011, Cooper took the position of shadow home secretary amidst a shadow cabinet reshuffle. In this position, Cooper shadowed Theresa May at the Home Office. She labelled the government's vans displaying posters urging illegal immigrants to go home a "divisive gimmick" in October 2013.

In February 2013, she was assessed as one of the 100 most powerful women in the United Kingdom by Woman's Hour on BBC Radio 4, although not in the top 20.

In 2013, she proposed the appointment of a national commissioner for domestic and sexual violence. She spoke at the Labour Party Conference in 2014 about eastern Europeans who were mistreated by employers of migrant labour.

Cooper was strongly critical of cuts to child tax credit announced by George Osborne in the July 2015 Budget; she authored the following statement in the New Statesman:

And remember David Cameron's pre-election pledge that child tax credit is "not going to fall." It was a lie. This is a shameful betrayal of parents working hard to support their kids and get on in life. In the twenty-first century working parents shouldn't have to go to food banks to put a hot meal on the table, as too many families now do.

=== 2015 Labour leadership election ===
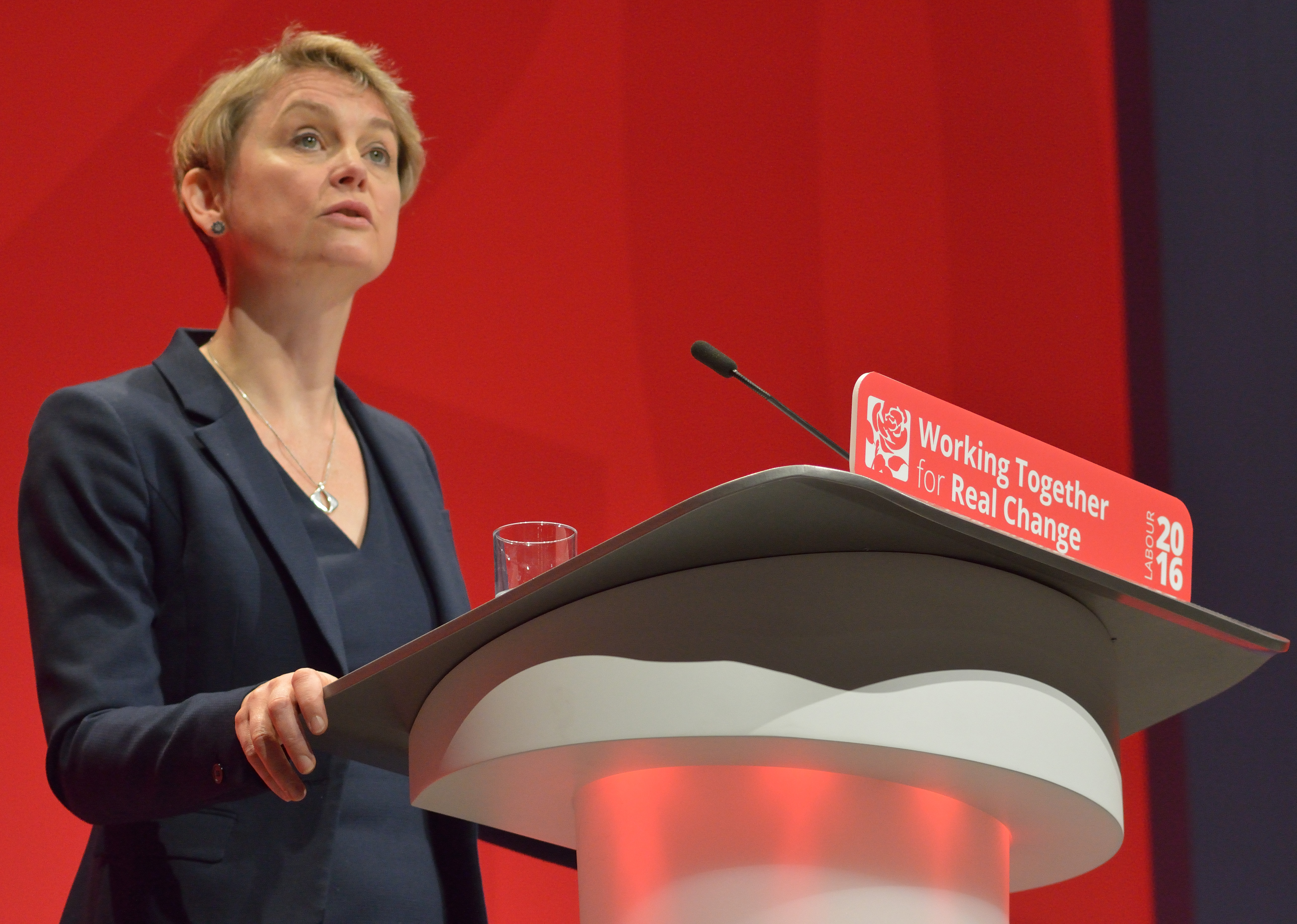
Cooper speaking at the 2016 Labour Party Conference

At the 2015 general election, Cooper was re-elected as MP for Normanton, Pontefract, and Castleford with an increased vote share of 54.9% and an increased majority of 6.7%. Following the election and Ed Miliband's resignation, she was nominated as one of four candidates for the Labour leadership. Cooper was nominated by 59 MPs, 12 MEPs, 109 CLPs, two affiliated trade unions and one socialist society. The Guardian newspaper endorsed Cooper as the "best placed" to offer a strong vision and unite the party while the New Statesman's endorsement praised her experience. Former prime minister Gordon Brown publicly endorsed Cooper as his first choice for leader, as did former home secretary Alan Johnson.

During the campaign, Cooper supported reintroducing the 50p income tax rate and creating more high-skilled manufacturing jobs. She proposed the introduction of a living wage for social care workers and the construction of 300,000 houses every year. Cooper disagreed that Labour had spent too much whilst in government.

Cooper came third with 17.0% of the vote in the first round, losing to Jeremy Corbyn, and subsequently resigned as shadow home secretary.

=== Backbencher (2015–2021) ===
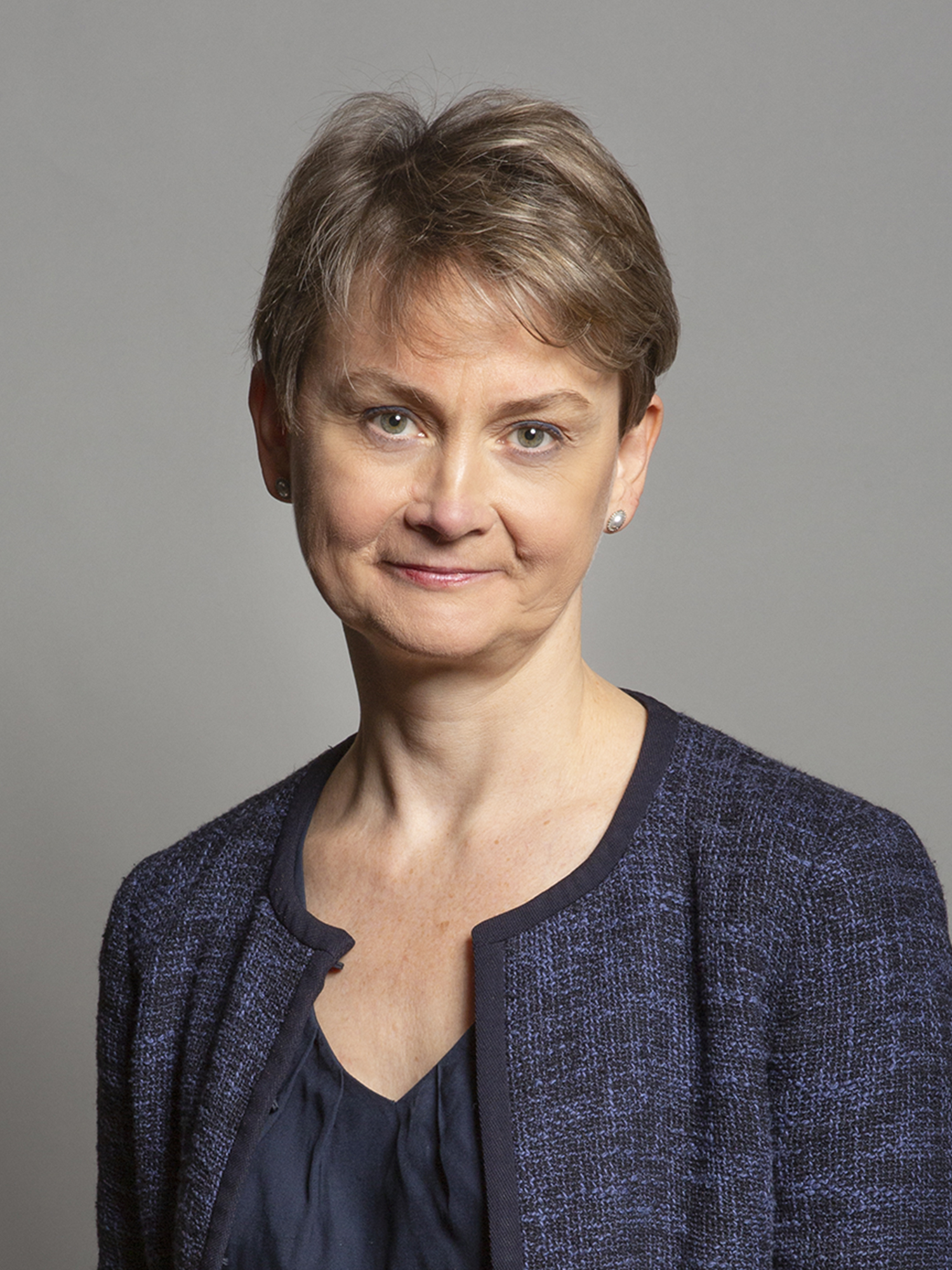
MP portrait, 2019

Cooper returned to the backbenches following her defeat in the leadership election, after nearly 17 years on the frontbench. Building on her existing work on the European refugee crisis, Cooper was appointed chair of Labour's refugee taskforce, working with local authorities, community groups and trade unions to develop a sustainable and humanitarian response to the crisis. She spoke about the issue at Labour's annual conference in 2016.

She supported Owen Smith against Jeremy Corbyn in the 2016 leadership election.

Following a vote of MPs on 19 October 2016, Cooper was elected chair of the Home Affairs Select Committee, gaining more votes than fellow candidates, Caroline Flint, Chuka Umunna and Paul Flynn. As chair, Cooper launched a national inquiry into public views on immigration and, after an emergency inquiry into the Dubs scheme for child refugees, criticised the government's decision to end the programme in February 2017.

At the snap 2017 general election, Cooper was again re-elected, with an increased vote share of 59.5% and a decreased majority of 14,499.

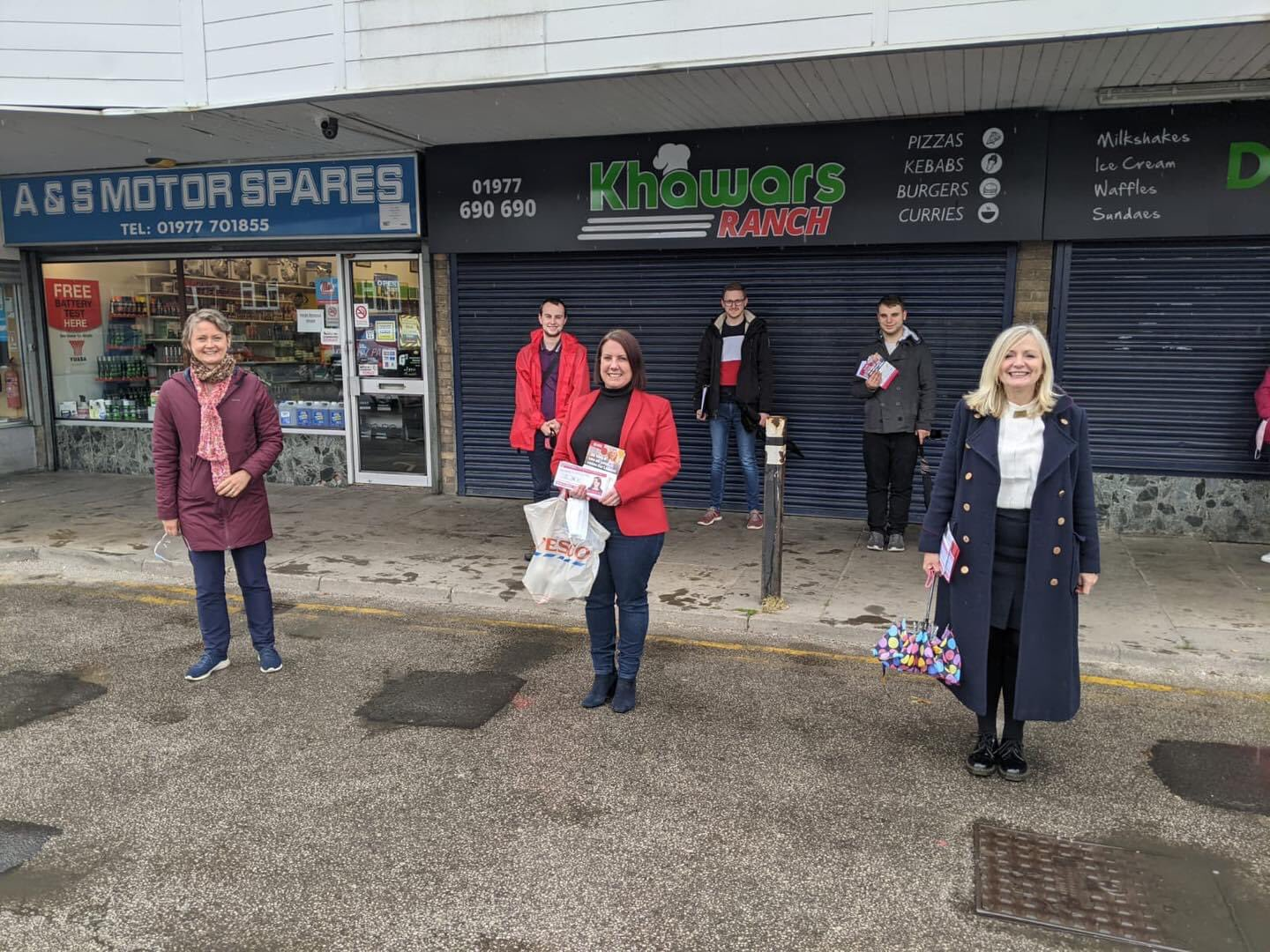
Yvette Cooper campaigning with Tracy Brabin in Pontefract in 2021

As part of the centenary celebrations of the Women's Suffrage Centenary in the UK, Yvette Cooper wore an outfit and rosette in the colours of the Women's Social and Political Union, an organisation which conducted a bombing and arson campaign between the years 1912 and 1914, causing injuries and deaths.

Cooper was critical of the May government's infrastructure plans' focus on big cities, and was formerly the chair of Labour Towns, a group of Labour MPs, councillors and mayors of towns seeking to promote investment in them – publishing a town manifesto in 2019.

In 2019, she was listed as a parliamentary supporter of Labour Friends of Israel.

She was again re-elected at the 2019 general election, with a decreased vote share of 37.9% and a decreased majority of 1,276.

==== Brexit ====
During the Brexit process, Cooper consistently fought against a no-deal Brexit, tabling one of the main amendments in January 2019; others to table amendments were Caroline Spelman, Graham Brady, Rachel Reeves, Dominic Grieve and Ian Blackford.

In April, Cooper tabled a private members' bill, again with the intended effect of preventing a "no-deal" Brexit. The Bill was voted to be discussed as an important bill using processes often used for issues of national security. MPs voted 312 to 311 in favour of allowing her bill to be fast-tracked, and it was made law on 8 April 2019.

=== Starmer Shadow Cabinet (2021–2024) ===
Cooper was reappointed as shadow home secretary on 29 November 2021 by Keir Starmer, replacing Nick Thomas-Symonds in a shadow cabinet reshuffle.

Following allegations that Suella Braverman had breached the ministerial code by sending secure information with her private email, Cooper asked for possible security implications to be investigated. She wrote to Simon Case "I am urging you and the Home Office to now urgently undertake such an investigation [into possible security breaches] as the public has a right to know that there are proper secure information procedures in place to cover the person who has been given charge of our national security." Cooper said that it raised doubts about the Prime Minister's judgement. She also added that people need to be able to trust the home secretary with highly sensitive information and national security. Cooper said that the Conservative Party lacked ethics and adequate standards.

=== Home Secretary (2024–2025) ===
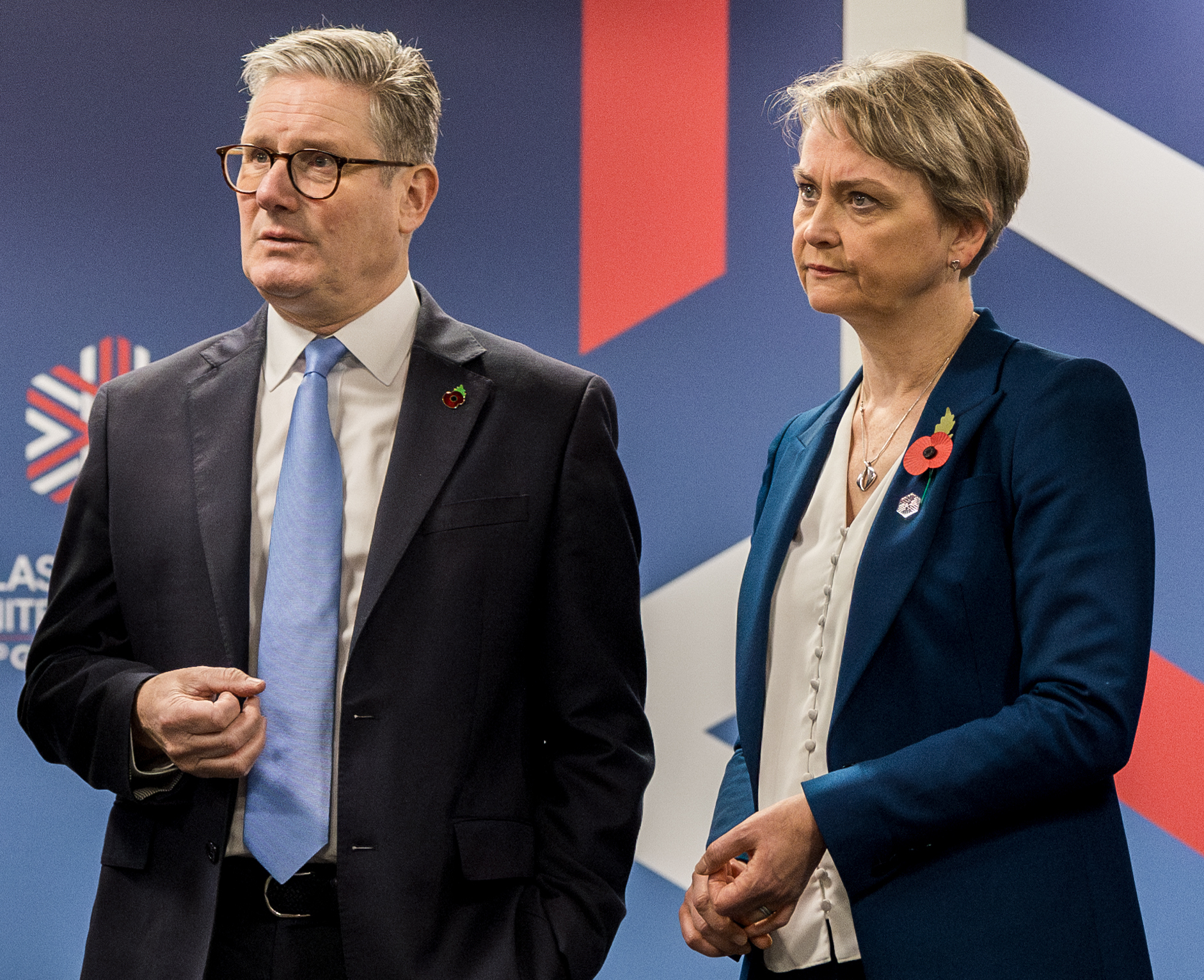
Cooper with Prime Minister Keir Starmer at the 92nd Interpol General Assembly, 4 November 2024

Due to the 2023 review of Westminster constituencies, Cooper's constituency of Normanton, Pontefract and Castleford was abolished, and replaced with Pontefract, Castleford and Knottingley. At the 2024 general election, Cooper was elected to Parliament as MP for Pontefract, Castleford and Knottingley with 47.5% of the vote and a majority of 6,630.

Following Labour's victory in the general election, Cooper was appointed home secretary by Starmer in his government on 5 July. On 7 July, after Starmer confirmed that the Rwanda asylum plan had been scrapped, Cooper announced that the Border Security Command would be established in order to help reduce small boat crossings across the English channel.

Following the 2024 Southport stabbings, in which three young girls were killed, Cooper stated that she was concerned by the incident and described the emergency services' response as courageous. Cooper additionally visited Southport the following morning to lay flowers and meet officials and community leaders. Starmer also visited the same day and laid flowers at the scene, and was heckled by some members of the public. Cooper later condemned the riots across England and Northern Ireland following the stabbing. After Axel Rudakubana's guilty plea on 20 January 2025, Cooper announced a public inquiry, stating that the victims' families "needed answers about what had happened leading up to the attack". This was followed by Starmer's promise to overhaul terrorism laws to reflect the type of non-ideological killings characterised by individuals like Rudakubana, stressing the threat from "acts of extreme violence perpetrated by loners, misfits, young men in their bedroom, accessing all manner of material online, desperate for notoriety, sometimes inspired by traditional terrorist groups, but fixated on that extreme violence, seemingly for its own sake". Significant attention was drawn to the anti-radicalisation Prevent programme for failing to accept referrals of Rudakubana on the basis of him lacking a terrorist ideology. Although an emergency review found that Prevent had followed correct procedures on each referral, Cooper concluded "that too much weight was placed on the absence of ideology" in the programme. Cooper announced that there would be a review on the threshold at which Prevent intervenes, with senior lawyer David Anderson being assigned by Starmer as the Independent Prevent Commissioner to perform the review.

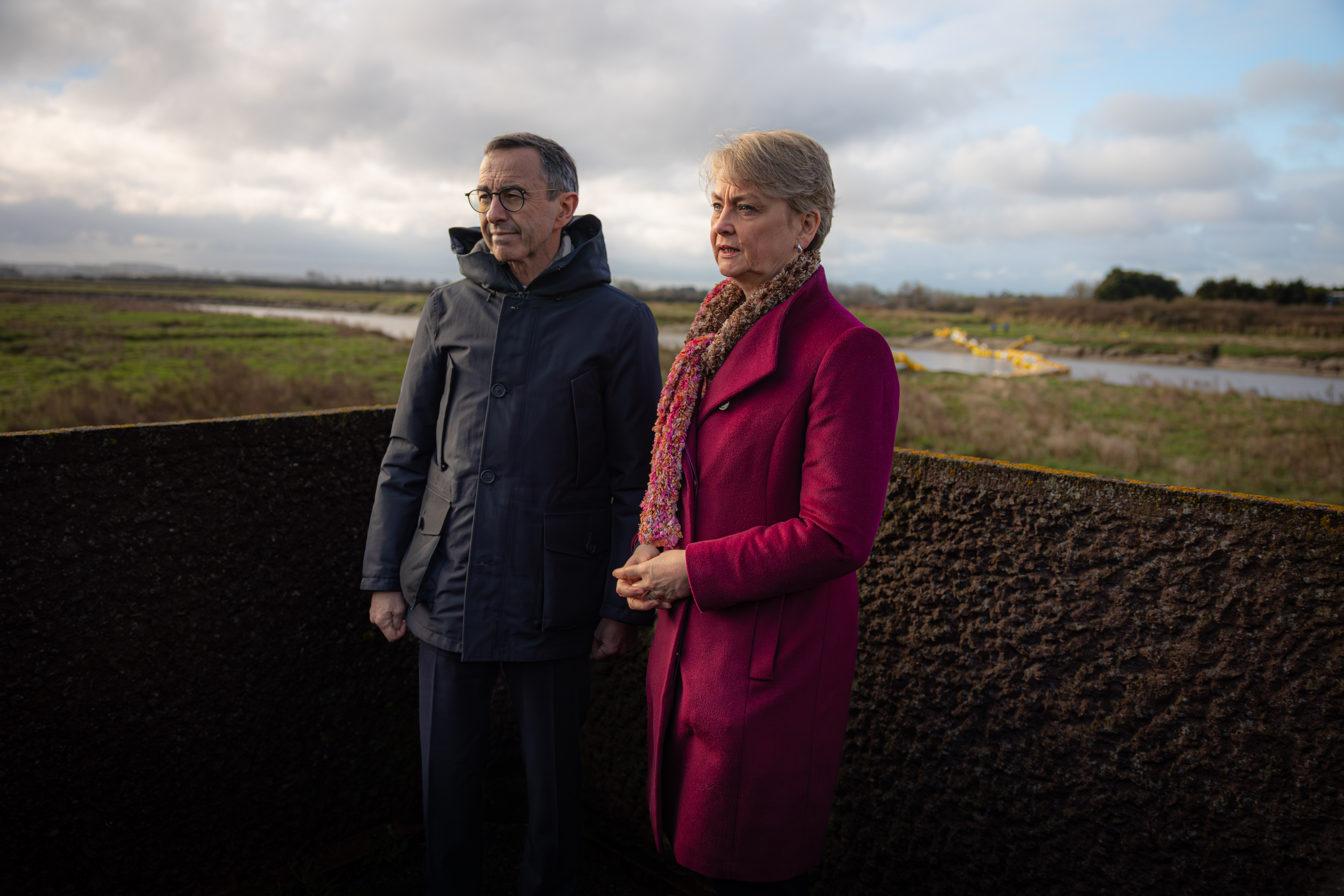
Cooper with French Interior Minister Bruno Retailleau in February 2025.

The new office of Border Security Commander was established, whose remit would be to lead the new command and its members. The command was launched by Cooper on 7 July 2024. The command would be funded by money previously earmarked for the Rwanda plan and would be responsible for coordinating the activities of Immigration Enforcement, MI5, the Border Force and the National Crime Agency in tackling smuggling gangs which facilitate illegal migrant crossings over the English Channel. A team in the Home Office was tasked with setting out the remit of the command, as well as its governance structure and its strategic direction. Martin Hewitt was appointed to the role of Border Security Commander in September 2024, by the Home Secretary.

Cooper faced a significant backlash over her "immigration crackdown", with critics saying that her plans were "a waste of taxpayer money, lack detail and fail to recognise 'the dignity and humanity of migrants', especially in the wake of recent racist riots that targeted hotels housing asylum seekers across the country", with Amnesty International accusing Cooper of "reheating the Conservative government's rhetoric around border security", and Enver Solomon of the Refugee Council stating that she was "wasting taxpayers' money on expanding detention places." Cooper's Border Security, Asylum and Immigration Bill was criticised by fellow Labour MPs for retaining Conservative era anti-migrant legislation, with Sarah Champion criticising the bill for disqualifying asylum seekers who cross the Channel in small boats from claiming protection from modern slavery, and Nadia Whittome stating the legislation must reverse "powers to detain child refugees for up to 28 days." Later in September 2024 she was likewise also accused of "playing catch-up to Reform".

After a trans rights protest in London she branded messages of trans solidarity on the statues of several influential figures, including South African prime minister Jan Smuts, "disgraceful".

In November 2024, Cooper voted in favour of the Terminally Ill Adults (End of Life) Bill, which proposes to legalise assisted suicide.

In May 2025, Starmer launched a white paper on the topic of immigration with a speech including that the UK risked becoming an "island of strangers", and that high immigration had done "incalculable damage" to society. His language was criticised for its perceived echoes of Enoch Powell's Rivers of Blood speech, and in June, Starmer apologised for his "island of strangers" comment, saying that the phrase "wasn't right" and "I deeply regret using it". Later, Cooper said she had been effectively excluded from launching the immigration white paper, which was a home office policy, by the Prime Minister's Office who wanted it fronted by Starmer, saying "I didn't see what was going to be said or what the announcement was … that was the way that No 10 operated."

On On 23 June 2025, after Palestine Action activists broke into RAF Brize Norton and damaged two military aircraft, Cooper announced to Parliament that the group would be proscribed under the Terrorism Act 2000. The proscription order, which also covered the Maniacs Murder Cult and the Russian Imperial Movement, was approved by the House of Commons by 385 votes to 26; some MPs objected to the three groups being proscribed in a single vote. On 13 February 2026, the High Court ruled that the proscription was unlawful, although it remained in force pending an appeal. The Court of Appeal overturned that ruling on 15 June 2026, finding the ban lawful; by then, more than 3,000 arrests had been made in connection with support for the group. In July 2026, the Supreme Court granted co-founder Huda Ammori permission to appeal.

=== Foreign Secretary (2025–2026) ===
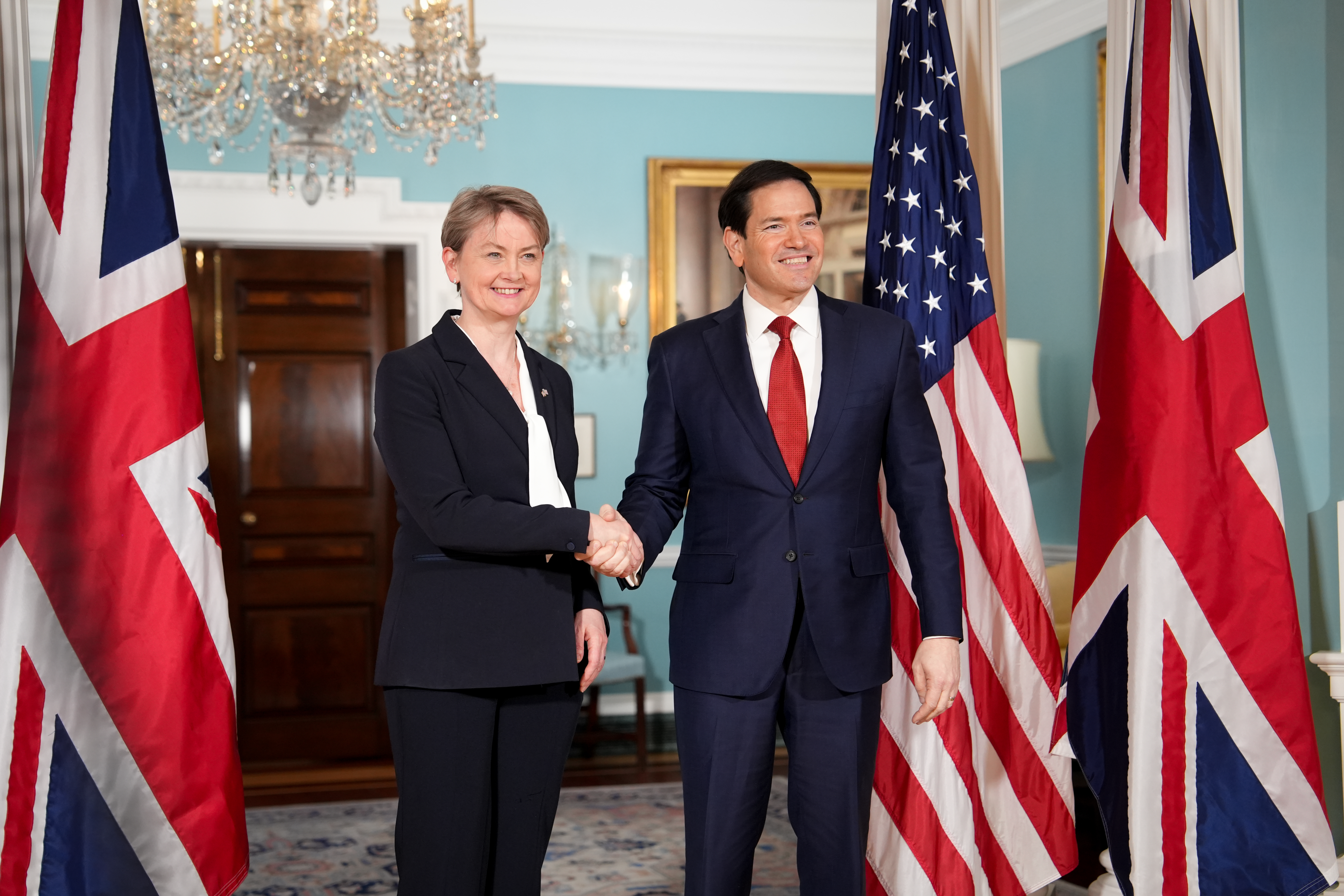
Cooper and Marco Rubio in December 2025

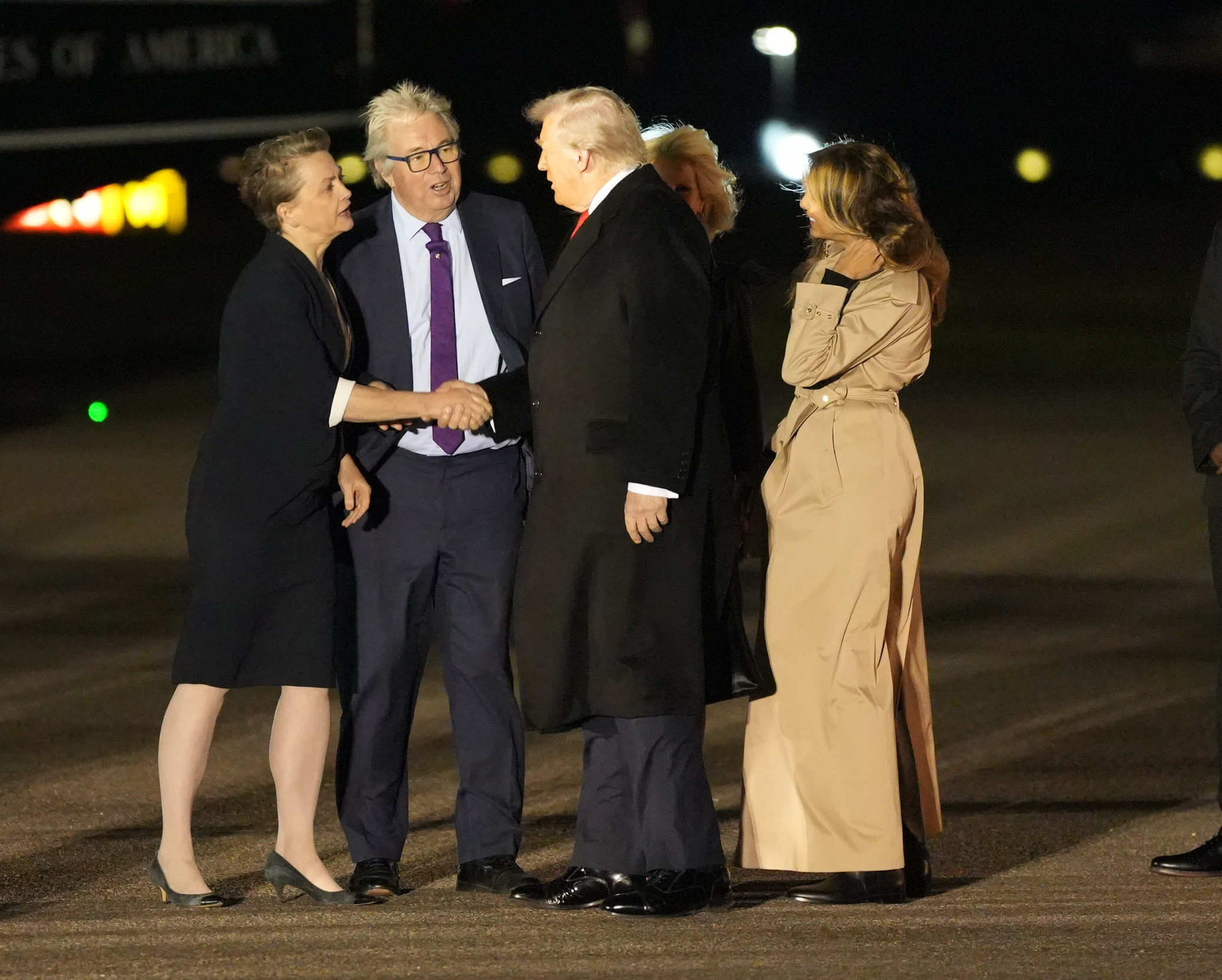
Cooper greeting US president Donald Trump and first lady Melania Trump in September 2025.

Cooper was appointed Foreign Secretary on 5 September 2025 during the cabinet reshuffle which followed the resignation of Deputy Prime Minister Angela Rayner. She became the first woman in British political history to have served as both home and foreign secretary. Her first overseas visit as Foreign Secretary was a trip to Ukraine, during which she met with Ukrainian foreign minister Andrii Sybiha and announced sanctions against companies involved in supporting the Russian invasion.

As Foreign Secretary, Cooper oversaw the British government's decision in September 2025 to recognise the state of Palestine, which she stated was "borne of urgency and principle", and which must be "a spur, not a substitute for urgent action" towards a ceasefire.

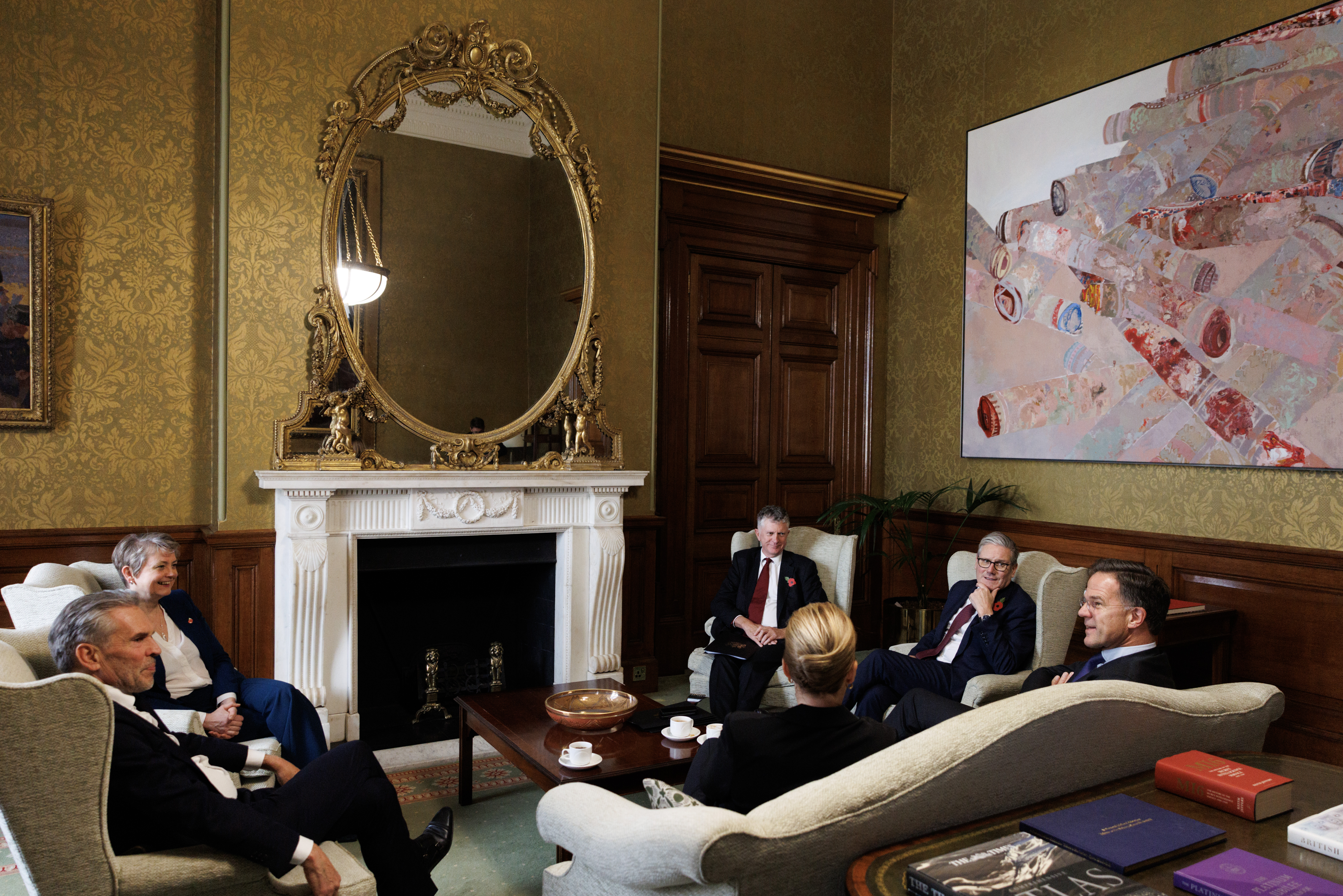
Cooper and Starmer meeting with Prime Ministers Mette Frederiksen, Dick Schoof and Secretary General Mark Rutte in October 2025

In December 2025, Cooper publicly identified China as a national security threat due to its cyber-attacks, espionage, and its support for Russia "in its war against Ukraine".

In December 2025, Cooper condemned the "horrific" atrocities in El Fasher, Sudan, describing them as a "scar on the conscience of the world". Her statements followed the fall of El Fasher to the Rapid Support Forces (RSF) in late October 2025, which led to reports of widespread massacres. In late 2025, Cooper faced significant parliamentary and public pressure regarding allegations that the United Arab Emirates (UAE) is supplying arms to the RSF in Sudan. She has avoided committing to an immediate arms embargo on the UAE, instead focusing on diplomatic pressure and humanitarian aid.

In January 2026, following the capture of Nicolas Maduro by the United States in Venezuela, Cooper spoke to her counterpart, Secretary of State Marco Rubio, and later announced to the House of Commons that she had reminded Rubio of the country's "obligation" to international law.

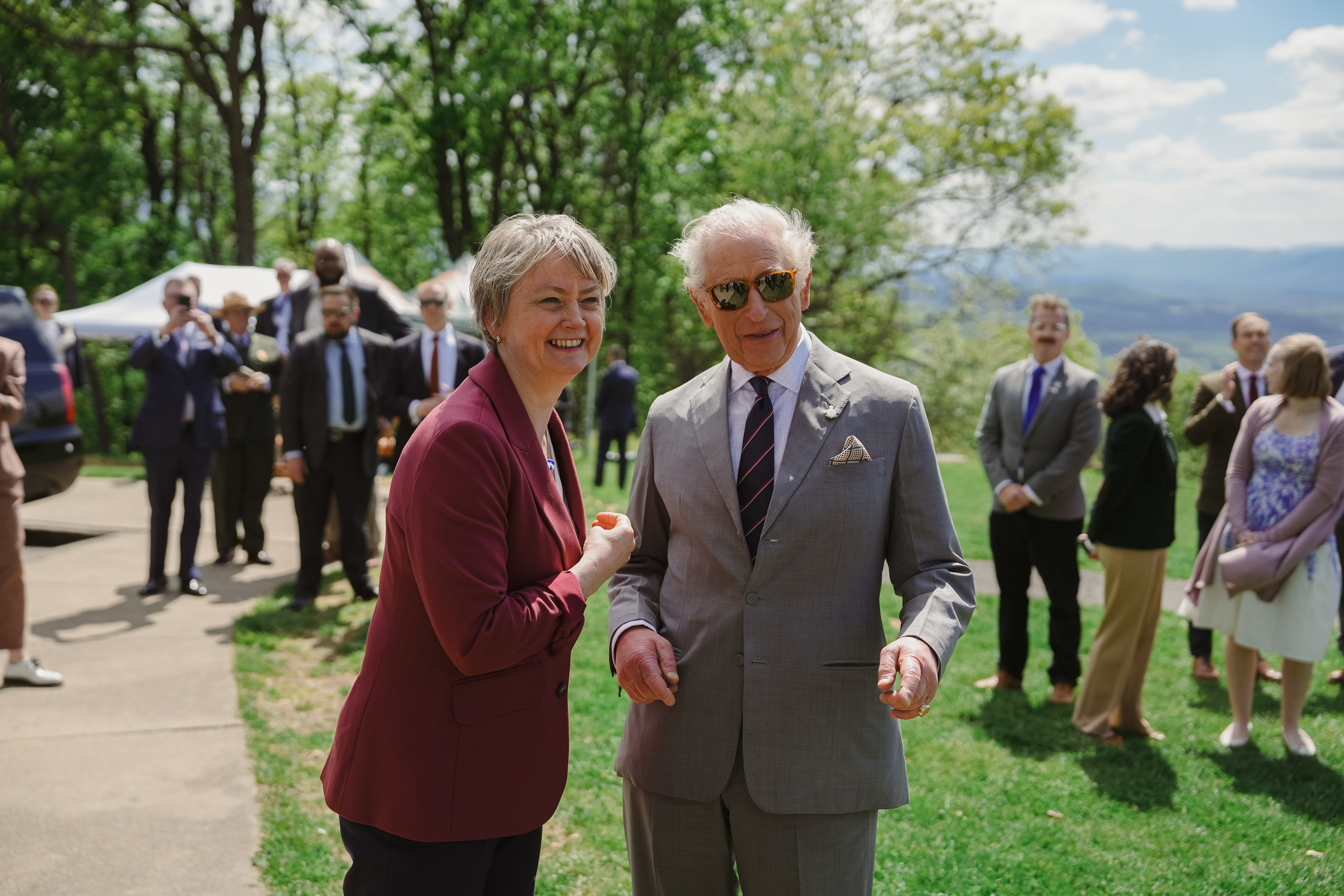
Cooper with Charles III at Shenandoah National Park during the 2026 state visit.

In February and March 2026, the UK government refused to join the US–UK strikes on Iran which eventually culminated in the 2026 Iran war. In response from criticism from Tony Blair over the UK not joining the war, Cooper stated that "there are some people in politics who think that we should always agree with the US whatever. There are other people in politics who think we should never take action with the US again whatever the circumstances. I don’t think either of those positions is in the UK national interest". She added that it was the responsibility of Starmer to act in the "UK national interest" following criticism of Starmer by US president Donald Trump.

During the 2026 Labour Party leadership crisis on 21 June 2026, shortly after the victory of Andy Burnham in the Makerfield by-election, Cooper reportedly told Starmer to resign as Prime Minister. Cooper later endorsed and then nominated Burnham in the subsequent leadership election.

In July 2026, after the announcement that the Islamic Revolutionary Guards Corp (IRGC) would be proscribed, Cooper summoned the Iranian ambassador to the UK, Ali Mousavi, to the Foreign Office. She said that the intelligence services of Iran had planned and "conducted dangerous, potentially lethal, operations".

=== Health Secretary (2026–present) ===
On 20 July 2026, Andy Burnham appointed Cooper as Secretary of State for Health and Social Care, succeeding James Murray. She was succeeded as Foreign Secretary by Ed Miliband.

== Political positions ==
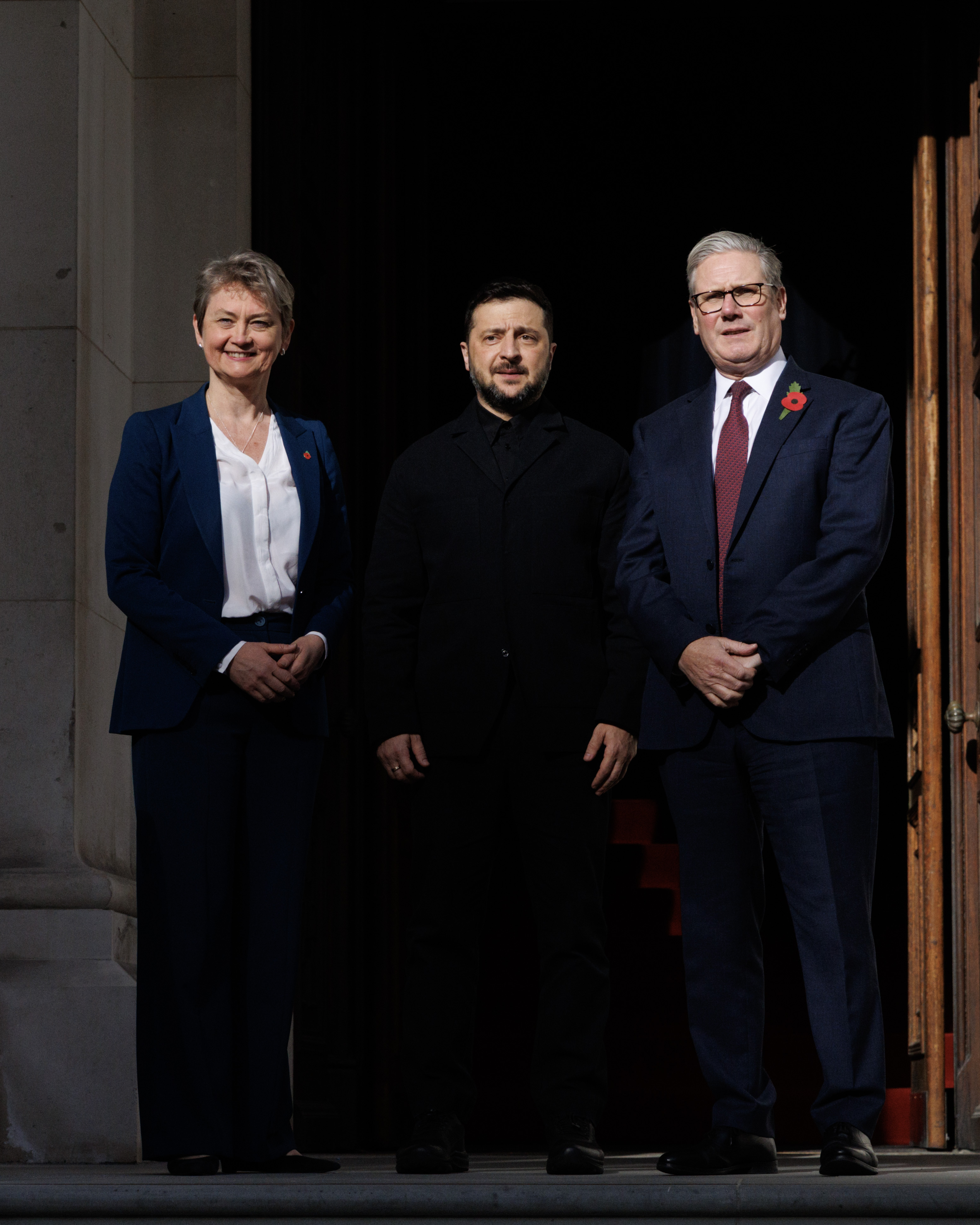
Cooper with Starmer and Ukrainian President Volodymyr Zelenskyy in September 2025.

=== Foreign Affairs ===
==== Russia and Ukraine ====
Cooper has condemned Russia for its actions in the Russo-Ukrainian war. In 2025, she described the war as an "illegal and unprovoked war of aggression" which was an assault on the UN charter.

In November 2024, Cooper criticised Russian president Vladimir Putin for his threats to use weapons against nations whose own weapons were used to attack Russia. In an interview with Sky News, Cooper stated that "Russia invaded a sovereign state" and that Putin had used an "aggressive, blustering tone" throughout the conflict which she described as "completely unacceptable".

Following Russian attacks on Kyiv in May 2026, Cooper condemned the "awful scenes" and vowed to "keep up pressure on Russia".

==== Brexit ====
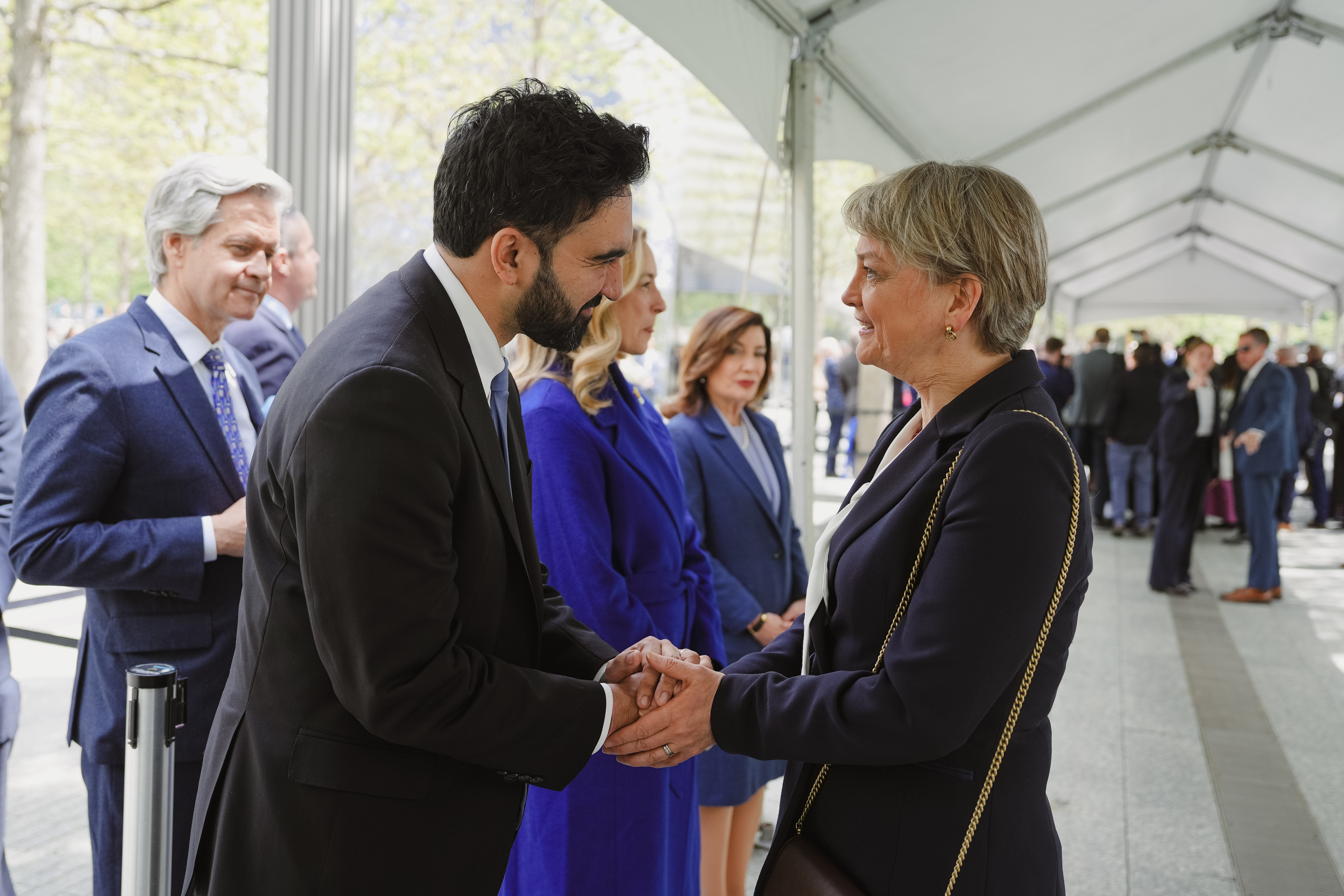
Cooper with New York City mayor Zohran Mamdani in 2026.

Cooper campaigned to remain in the European Union (EU) in the 2016 Brexit referendum. She argued that the leave campaign suggested that the leave campaign promised to both end free movement and stay in the single market. Cooper stated that "if you want to change the rules, you have to be in there. You can't get reform if you stay on the outside", and argued that a "false promise" was being given over the future border controls of Britain.

==== Immigration and asylum ====
During the 2015 leadership election, in August, Cooper called for a "moral approach" to the European migrant crisis. She criticised the government of David Cameron, for having "repeatedly failed" to take diplomatic action with France to assess the number of people camped out to cross the English Channel who were refugees. She also argued that Britain "does need to do more overall to take people, particularly who are refugees from Syria and from the humanitarian crisis in Syria."

In September 2015, Cooper pressured Cameron to do more to respond to the Syrian humanitarian crisis, stating that "Syria is the humanitarian catastrophe of our generation. We cannot turn our backs." She argued that if every city or county took ten families each, then Britain would be able to help nearly 10,000 people.

In 2020, Cooper tabled an amendment to an immigration bill ending freedom movement which sought to extend existing rules to allow unaccompanied child refugees to be reunited with relatives in the UK. She argued that "desperate young people have already lost their lives, we should not turn our backs on them now, we need to sustain those safe and legal routes."

When in power as Home Secretary, Cooper began significant efforts, continued by successor Shabana Mahmoud, to make settlement for migrants and refugees longer, costlier, and less secure, facing significant criticism for an “immigration crackdown,” as discussed above.

==== NATO ====
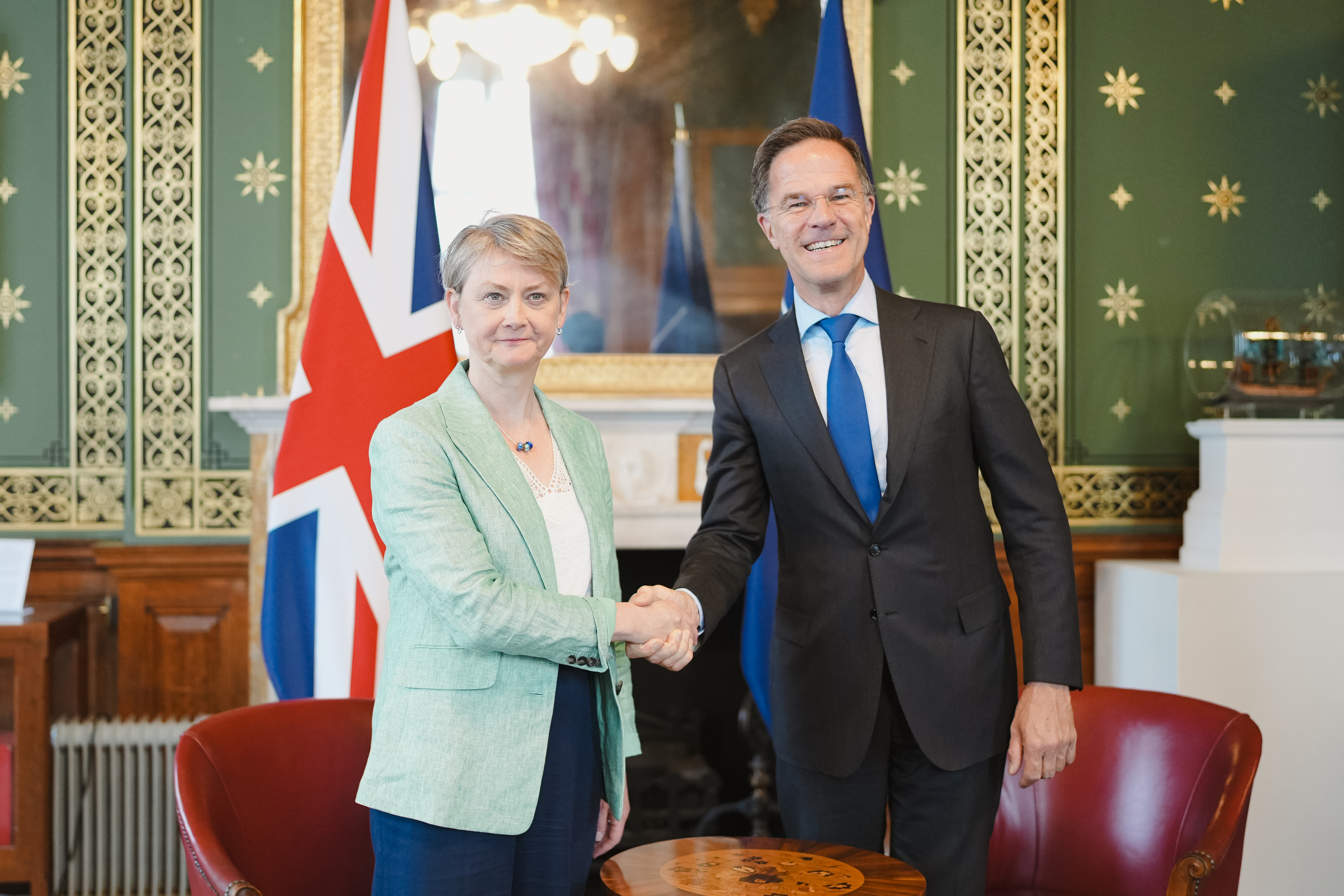
Cooper with NATO Secretary General Mark Rutte in June 2026.

Cooper has been supportive of the North Atlantic Treaty Organisation (NATO). She was critical of Jeremy Corbyn's policy of withdrawing from NATO. In 2015, she argued that it was "not radical" to support leaving the organisation, but that the UK should "stay in NATO" as internationalism was a "core Labour principle" and said that she would "always fight for it".

In January 2026, Cooper called for NATO defence against Russia in the Arctic. Cooper argued that the region was "the gateway for Russia's Northern Fleet to be able to threaten the United Kingdom, to threaten Western Europe and Norway, to threaten the United States and Canada." She also called on NATO to "double down" and to "do what we've done in other areas" in order to "really strengthen the security of the high north".

In February 2026, Cooper criticised Reform and the Green party for what she described as being "soft on Russia and weak on NATO". She argued that "our national security depends on us having partnerships abroad that make us strong", and suggested that the two parties had been seen to "undermine that commitment to the NATO alliance".

=== Social issues and individual liberties ===
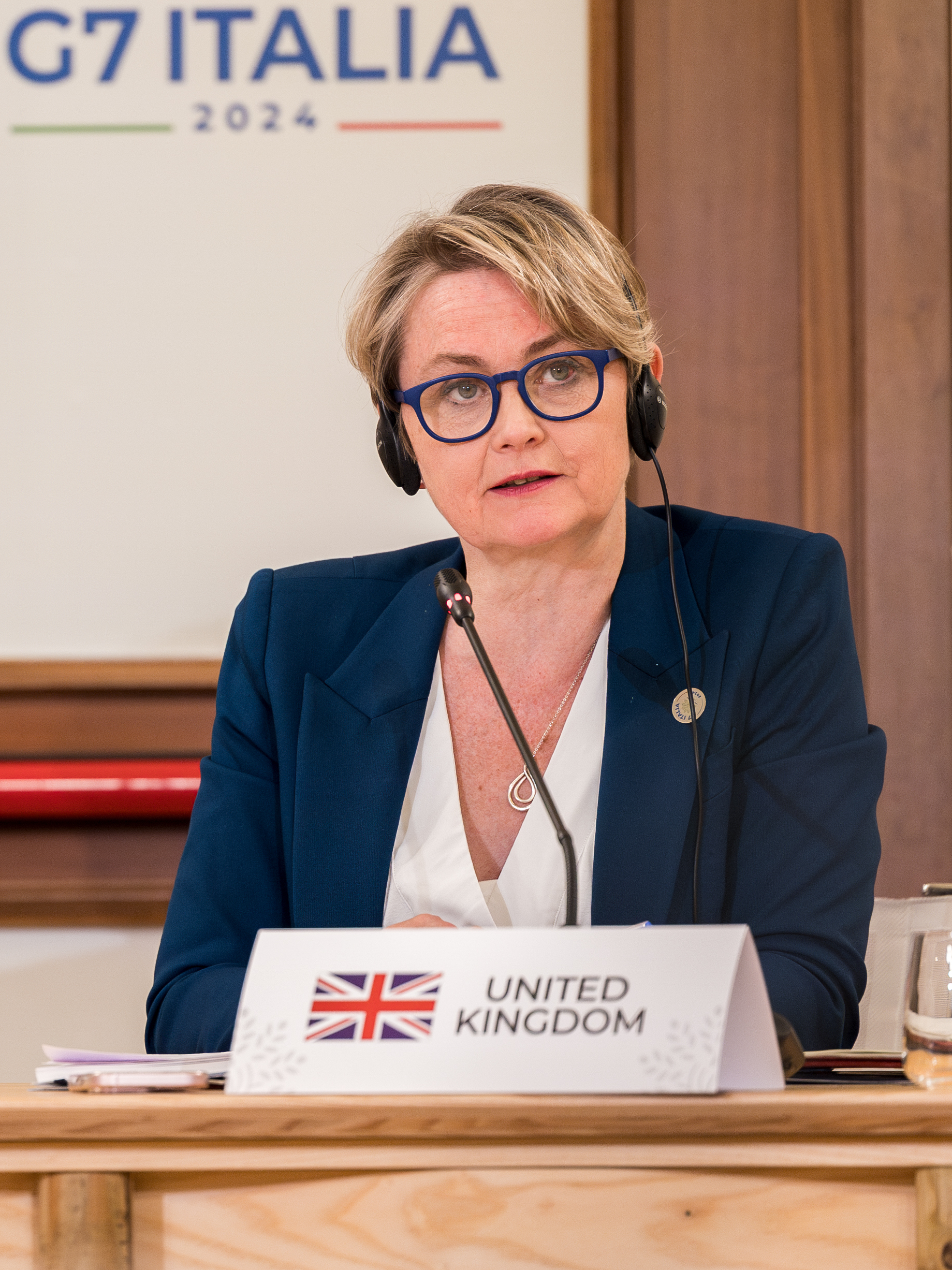
Cooper attending the 2024 G7 summit in Italy.

==== Assisted dying ====
In 2024, ahead of the vote on the Terminally Ill Adults (End of Life) Bill which proposed to legalise assisted suicide for terminally ill adults, Cooper stated that she voted for it about "20 years ago" and continued to believe that "change is needed". She said that she had not changed her view on the "principles of the issue", but recognised that a "detailed debate" was needed on the "detail of legislation on the kinds of safeguards and things that need to be in place".

==== Same-sex marriage ====
Cooper is a supporter of same-sex marriage and sponsored the Marriage (Same Sex Couples) Act 2013. She argued in 2012 that the arguments against changing the law were "deeply unconvincing", and argued that the legislation to legalise same-sex marriage was straightforward. She wrote a piece in The Independent titled "Marriage is about joy, whatever your gender" in May 2013. In her speech in the debate in the House of Commons, she argued "Parliament shouldn't stop people getting married just because they have fallen in love with someone of the same sex. Parliament shouldn't say that same sex relationships are intrinsically worth less."

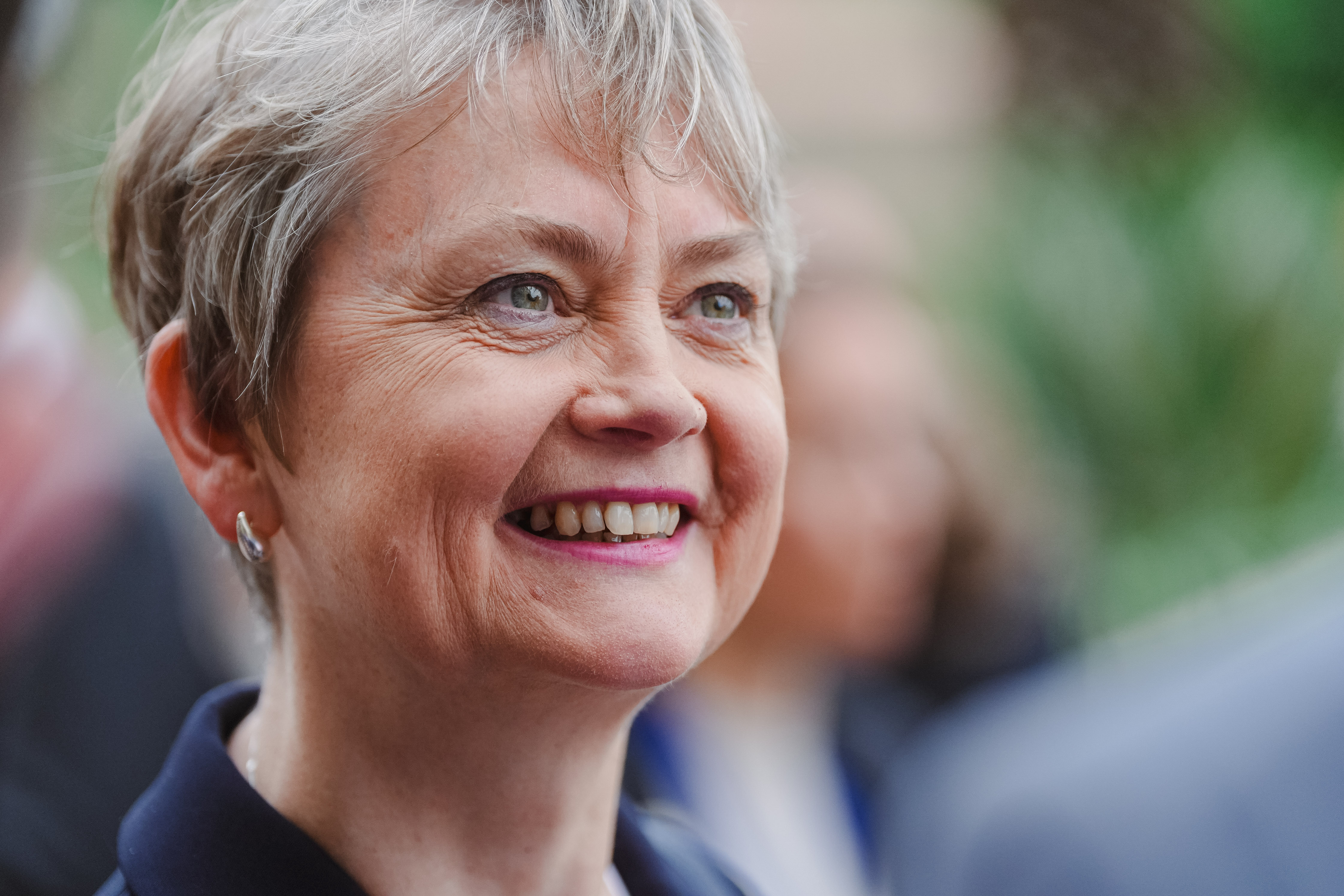
Cooper in October 2025.

In response to Church of England opposition, Cooper argued that "two people who love each other and want to make a long term commitment to each other should be able to get married whatever their gender or sexuality." She went on to say that Parliament had legislated on civil marriage for "400 years", and that it should "update it again now" so that "long term loving relationships" could remain "relevant" and reflect "our sense of justice and equality in a modern society".

After the 2013 bill was passed by Parliament, Cooper said that it was a time to "celebrate, not discriminate".

==== Transgender issues ====
In 2015, Cooper, as Shadow Women and Equalities Minister, stated the Labour would look into issuing gender neutral passports for people who identified as neither male or female if Labour won the 2015 general election. The passports would have allowed for people to write Gender X as their gender on their passport. She pledged to hold a review, citing the gender recognition act being 10 years old, and argued that there were a "whole series of issues" in the law which affected "intersex and trans people".

In March 2022, Cooper refused to give a definition of what a woman was, describing the subject as a "rabbit hole".

== Personal life ==
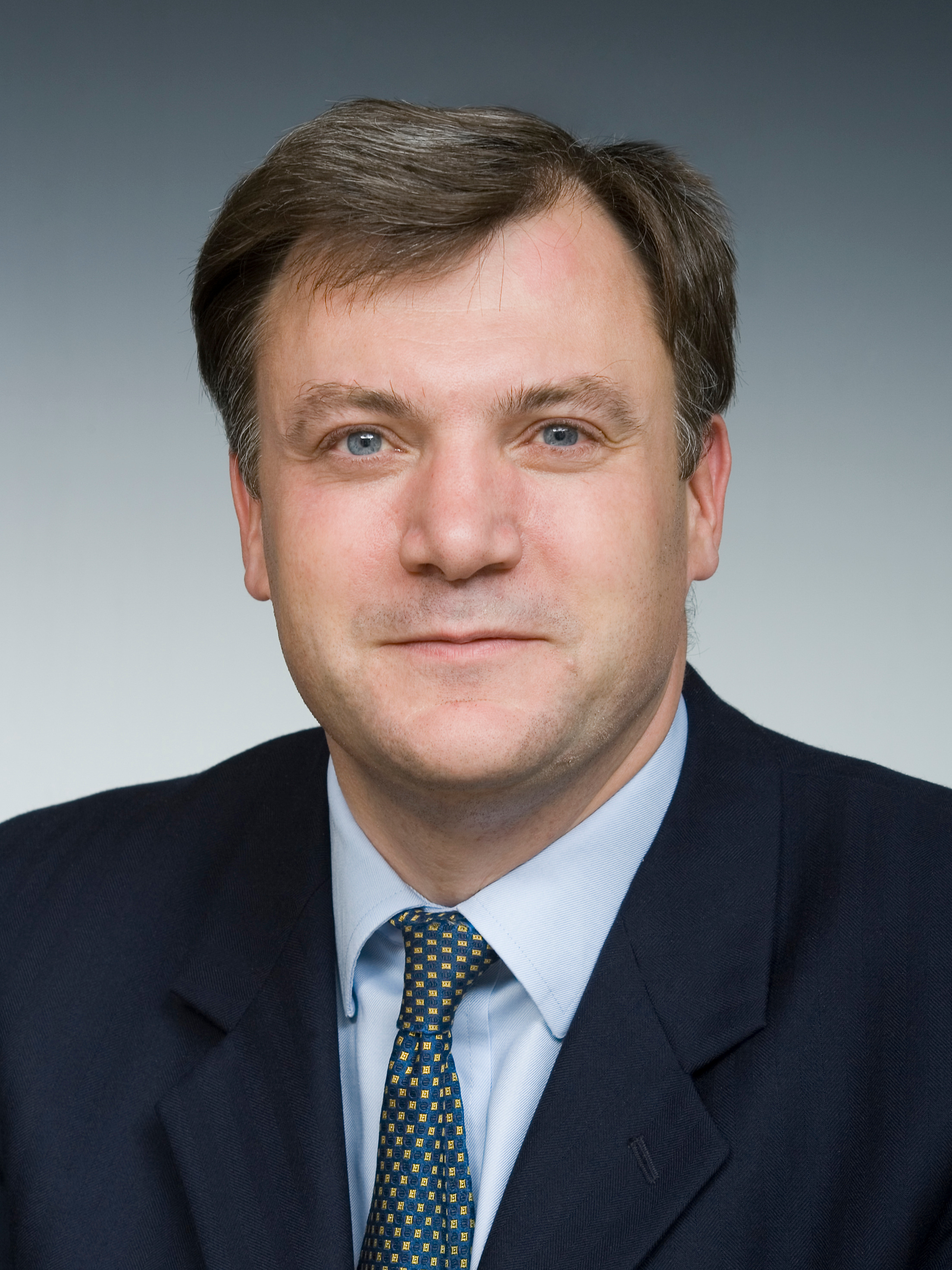
Ed Balls

Cooper married Ed Balls on 10 January 1998 in Eastbourne. Her husband was Economic Secretary to the Treasury in the Tony Blair government and Secretary of State for Children, Schools and Families under Gordon Brown, then in opposition was Shadow Chancellor of the Exchequer and a candidate in the 2010 Labour Party leadership election. The couple have two daughters and one son.

Cooper has published two books, entitled She Speaks: The Power of Women's Voices and She Speaks: Women's Speeches That Changed the World, from Pankhurst to Greta, released in November 2019 and October 2020, respectively.

Following the Russian invasion of Ukraine, Cooper has housed a Ukrainian family in her home in Castleford.

== See also ==
- Everywoman Safe Everywhere – Labour's Consultation on Women's Safety

Parliament of the United Kingdom
Preceded by Geoffrey Lofthouse	Member of Parliament for Pontefract and Castleford; 1997–2010	Constituency abolished
New constituency	Member of Parliament for Normanton, Pontefract and Castleford; 2010–2024	Constituency abolished
New constituency	Member of Parliament for Pontefract, Castleford and Knottingley; 2024–present	Incumbent
Political offices
Preceded by Keith Hill	Minister of State for Housing and Planning; 2005–2008	Succeeded by Caroline Flint
Preceded by Andy Burnham	Chief Secretary to the Treasury; 2008–2009	Succeeded by Liam Byrne
Preceded by James Purnell	Secretary of State for Work and Pensions; 2009–2010	Succeeded by Iain Duncan Smith
Preceded by Theresa May	Shadow Secretary of State for Work and Pensions; 2010	Succeeded by Douglas Alexander
Preceded by Theresa May	Shadow Minister for Women and Equalities; 2010–2013	Succeeded by Gloria De Piero
Preceded by David Miliband	Shadow Foreign Secretary; 2010–2011	Succeeded by Douglas Alexander
Preceded by Ed Balls	Shadow Home Secretary; 2011–2015	Succeeded by Andy Burnham
Preceded by Nick Thomas-Symonds	Shadow Home Secretary; 2021–2024	Succeeded by James Cleverly
Preceded by James Cleverly	Home Secretary; 2024–2025	Succeeded by Shabana Mahmood
Preceded by David Lammy	Foreign Secretary; 2025–2026	Succeeded by Ed Miliband
Preceded by James Murray	Secretary of State for Health and Social Care; 2026–present	Incumbent
