= Mike Clancy (trade unionist) =

British trade union leader

- Clancy speaking to Prospect and PCS members during the V&A Museum strikes in September 2026.
- Occupation: Trade unionist
- Known for: Secretary general of Prospect

Mike Clancy is a British trade union leader who has been secretary general of Prospect since 2012.

Clancy grew up in Liverpool and studied law before pursuing a career in industrial relations. He undertook further study at the University of Warwick, then became a researcher at the Clearing Bank Union. He then became a negotiator for the union, before in 1989 becoming an area secretary for the Engineers' and Managers' Association. He later became a national officer for the union, with time out in 2000 to complete an MBA at Cranfield University.

In 2001, the EMA merged into the new Prospect, with Clancy remaining a national officer until 2004, when he was appointed as deputy general secretary. He was elected as general secretary in 2012, also winning a seat on the General Council of the Trades Union Congress. In 2016, he was also appointed to the council of ACAS, and from 2017 he sat on the Nuclear Industry Council.

Trade union offices
Preceded by Paul Noon	General Secretary of Prospect; 2012–present	Succeeded by Incumbent
