= John Lyons (British trade unionist) =

British trade unionist

John Lyons CBE

General Secretary of the Electrical Power Engineers' Association
- In office 1973–1991
- Preceded by: Harry Norton
- Succeeded by: Tony Cooper

Personal details
- Born: 19 May 1926 Hendon, London, England
- Died: 22 May 2016 (aged 90)
- Party: CPGB (1948–56); Labour (1961–86; 1990s); SDP (1986–88)
- Education: St Paul's School, London; Emmanuel College, Cambridge
- Profession: Trade union leader
- Awards: Order of the British Empire (1986)

Military service
- Allegiance: United Kingdom
- Branch/service: Royal Navy
- Years of service: 1994–1946

John Lyons CBE (19 May 1926 – 22 May 2016) was a British trade union leader.

Born in Hendon, the son of a publican, Lyons was educated at St Paul's School, London. He served in the Royal Navy from 1944 until 1946, then attended Emmanuel College, Cambridge, where he studied economics. Following a year doing market research for the Vacuum Oil Company, he briefly worked in the research department of the British Army.

In 1952, Lyons began working for the Post Office Engineering Union, then in 1957 was appointed as assistant general secretary of the Institution of Professional Civil Servants. In 1973, he moved to the Electrical Power Engineers' Association (EPEA), where he was appointed as general secretary. Lyons was involved in arranging a series of mergers which formed the Engineers' and Managers' Association, serving as its general secretary, while remaining secretary of its EPEA section.

Lyons joined the Communist Party of Great Britain (CPGB) in 1948, but left following the Soviet invasion of Hungary in 1956. He subsequently became identified with the right wing of the trade union movement. In particular, he was vocally opposed to the UK miners' strike, and was supportive of the Union of Democratic Mineworkers split. He had an especially fractious relationship with Arthur Scargill, telling the Trades Union Congress in 1984 that "If anyone here thinks Arthur Scargill is an electoral asset he should have his brains tested." (Scargill responded in kind, accusing Lyons of "class collaboration".) Having been a member of the Labour Party for 25 years, in 1986 Lyons joined the centrist Social Democratic Party (SDP), although he returned to Labour after the SDP merged with the Liberals two years later.

Lyons also served on the General Council of the Trades Union Congress. He was made a Commander of the Order of the British Empire in 1986, and retired from his trade union posts in 1991. From 1996 until 1998, he served as president of the Single Market Observatory.

Trade union offices
Preceded by Harry Norton	General Secretary of the Electrical Power Engineers' Association; 1973 – 1991	Succeeded by Tony Cooper
