= 2026 Victoria and Albert Museum strikes =

Labour dispute in London, England

- Prospect and PCS members on strike outside of the V&A's Exhibition Road Courtyard on 25 September 2026
- Date: 4 September 2026 (Note: The first strike was held on 4 September; the related industrial disputes started earlier in 2026) – present (1 month and 23 days)
- Location: London, England
- Caused by: Pay and conditions disputes between workers and the Victoria and Albert Museum
- Goals: Increased pay and better working conditions
- Result: Ongoing, not yet decided

Parties
| V&A museum workers (represented by Prospect and the PCS) | Victoria and Albert Museum |

Lead figures
| Mike Clancy, Prospect; Fran Heathcote, PCS | Tristram Hunt, V&A director |

Starting in September 2026, workers at the Victoria and Albert Museum (V&A) in London undertook a series of strikes as part of an ongoing industrial dispute. The strikes have included around 700 members of Prospect and the Public and Commercial Services Union (PCS), over half of the museum's employees.

== Background ==
In 2026, the United Kingdom suffered a series of severe heatwaves which prompted discussion around working temperatures. The Trades Union Congress (TUC) and Unite the Union, one of the largest unions in the UK, called for a legal maximum working temperature. During the dispute, unions at the V&A called for a institution-wide policy to close to the public when the temperature is over 30°C.

The UK's cost of living crisis also continued into 2026 due to continued impact of increased prices after high inflation in the early 2020s as well as higher fuel and energy prices due to the 2026 Iran war. The cost of living is especially pronounced in London, where prices and rents are higher; the Trust for London reported in March 2026 that almost half of Londoners were not earning enough for a basic standing of living. The Living Wage Foundation's Real Living Wage for London was £14.80 by April 2026, compared to £13.45 across the rest of the UK. In October 2026, the Foundation raised the London Living Wage to £15.45 compared to £14.10 in the rest of the UK. The V&A Dundee, which is not involved in the strikes, is an accredited living-wage employer.

== Strike ballots ==
The unions highlighted a number of disputes with the V&A. PCS balloted on "pay, conditions and dignity at work", calling for better pay and the museum to become an accredited Real Living Wage employer, for time-and-a-half pay on bank holidays, for the museum to close at temperatures above 30°C, and for workers to be given better access to drinking water. Prospect members were balloted on similar disputes, including a 4% pay rise for staff earning above the living wage, time-and-a-half pay for bank holiday work, London Living Wage accreditation, and better food provision at V&A East sites.

The Guardian reported on 29 July that 83% of Prospect members voted for strike action and 95% voted for action short of a strike on a turnout of 82%. The PCS balloted its 332 members across the V&A in July 2026, announcing on 21 August that over 95% of members had voted in favour of strike action.

=== East Storehouse breaks dispute ===
A parallel dispute around toilet and hydration breaks for workers at the East Storehouse site also led to a strike ballot for Prospect members. On 29 July, The Guardian reported that 100% of workers voted to strike on a turnout of 88%. On 6 August, it was reported that workers at the V&A East Storehouse had won their dispute over toilet and hydration breaks and that workers would get two paid breaks a day.

== Industrial action ==
Mike Clancy speaking to workers on the picket line outside the V&A's Cromwell Road entrance.

Workers picketing the V&A's underground South Kensington Subway entrance.

The first strike was a two-day walkout on 4 and 5 September. The V&A pre-emptively closed the V&A East Museum and Storehouse as well as the Young V&A in Bethnal Green. Paula Lamont, Prospect's national secretary for heritage, said that the closures emphasised that "our members are critical to the operation of the museum." Although the strike did not include staff at the museum's South Kensington site, Lamont said that further strikes would be held across all sites if workers' demands were not addressed.

On 18 September, the PCS announced that the V&A had agreed to negotiations around the provision of water bottles and seating but said there had been "no movement on pay". Fran Heathcote, the PCS's general secretary, said that workers had been "left with no choice but to continue taking strike action".

In a statement released on 22 September, the V&A said that it "deeply regret[s]" that workers had voted to strike, that it had been negotiating in good faith and that it had responded to unions with improved offers. The statement also said that, despite not being accredited, all staff were paid the London Living Wage and had access to toilets and drinking water. It also noted that it had closed several parts of the V&A estate during heatwaves to keep staff and visitors safe.

The second two-day strike, only covering the V&A South Kensington site, occurred on 25 and 26 September. Mike Clancy, the general secretary of Prospect, said that workers had been left with "no choice" but to strike, saying that management "continues to not engage seriously on our very reasonable demands". The V&A said it would close most of the museum, saying that the cafe, the Schiaparelli: Fashion Becomes Art exhibition and "a limited number of galleries" would remain open. A picket line and rally was held in front of the museum's Cromwell Road entrance.

In October 2026, the Museums Journal reported that the V&A's voluntary exit scheme was prompting concerns from unions and workers who suggested that redundancies would increase pressure on staff. The V&A said that the scheme was in response to rising costs and real-terms reductions in funding.

A further strike across all V&A sites was planned for October half term, on Thursday 29 and Friday 30 October, but was suspended on 26 October in favour of further talks after an improved offer from V&A management.

== Reactions ==
An Early Day Motion was tabled in Parliament supporting the striking workers on 3 September 2026. It was sponsored by John McDonnell, Apsana Begum, Ian Byrne, Neil Duncan-Jordan, Andy McDonald and Kim Johnson. As of October 2026, it had been signed by a further ten MPs. (Note: The ten other signatories were Grahame Morris, Bell Ribeiro-Addy, Brian Leishman, Siân Berry, Carla Denyer, Hannah Spencer, Ellie Chowns, Ian Lavery, Cat Eccles and Diane Abbott.)
