= Paul Noon =

British trade unionist

Paul Thomas Noon OBE (born 1 December 1952) is a former British trade unionist.

Noon left school at the age of eighteen, and joined the civil service. He became active in the Institution of Professional Civil Servants (IPCS), serving as a negotiator from 1973. The IPCS became the Institution of Professionals, Managers and Specialists (IPMS) and Noon was elected as its general secretary in 1999. In 2001, he took the IPMS into a merger which formed Prospect, becoming general secretary of the new organisation.

Noon served on the General Council of the Trades Union Congress from 2001, serving as its lead on energy and the environment, and on its executive committee from 2002. From 2001 to 2003 and 2009 to 2012, he chaired the Council of Civil Service Unions.

At the end of 2012, Noon retired from his trade union posts, and was made an Officer of the Order of the British Empire. He subsequently became a director of the Unity Trust Bank.

Trade union offices
| Preceded by Bill Brett | General Secretary of the Institution of Professionals, Managers and Specialists; 1999 – 2001 | Succeeded by Position abolished |
| Preceded by New position | General Secretary of Prospect; 2001 – 2012; With: Tony Cooper (2001 – 2002) | Succeeded by Mike Clancy |
