= RegTech technician registration =

RegTech is a project established by the Prospect union to promote and support the professional registration of engineering, IT and science technicians in the UK.

== Membership bodies ==
With technician members across hundreds of workplaces in sectors ranging from defence and energy to heritage and telecoms, the union is working in conjunction with membership bodies including professional associations: the Engineering Council, Science Council, BCS - The Chartered Institute for IT and EngTechNow.

== Entitlement ==
Technicians who successfully gain professional registration status through a relevant membership body have the right to display the appropriate letters after their name. In the case of RegTech this means either EngTech, RSciTech or RITTech. The title or “post nominal” provides a formal recognition of relevant skills and experience.

== Career progression & skills gap ==
Prospect believes technician registration is a key means of supporting apprentices and other young professionals with structured vocational routes to career progression. While it is a valuable asset in its own right it can provide the foundation for achieving chartered status. More broadly the RegTech project is aimed at helping to address skills shortages, by raising the profile of technicians and attracting more recruits to the roles.

== Registration process ==
Registration is not exam-based but rather is achieved by providing evidence of the required knowledge, understanding and experience. This varies according to the relevant professional awarding body but can often take the form of a written application or face to face interview, with supporting documentation.

== Support ==
Prospect’s support for technician registration includes workplace surgeries, a dedicated online helpdesk and training for workplace RegTech advisers.

== Funding ==
The RegTech project is funded by the Gatsby Charitable Foundation, one of whose stated aims is to strengthen science and engineering skills in the UK by developing innovative programmes and informing national policy in the UK.
