= Bill Brett, Baron Brett =

British Labour politician and trade unionist

The Right Honourable The Lord Brett
- Brett in 2010

Member of the House of Lords
- Lord Temporal
- Life peerage 20 July 1999 – 29 March 2012

Personal details
- Born: 6 March 1942
- Died: 29 March 2012 (aged 70)

William Henry Brett, Baron Brett (6 March 1942 – 29 March 2012) was a British Labour politician and trade unionist. He was previously the Labour Party's spokesperson (when Labour entered opposition) for International Development.

Born in Heywood in Lancashire, the son of William and Mary Brett was educated in Radcliffe Technical College, in Radcliffe, near Bury. From 1958 to 1964, he worked for British Railways, from 1965 to 1967, he was administrative assistant for Transport Salaried Staffs Association, and from 1966 to 1968 North West organiser for National Union of Bank Employees. Between 1968 and 1974, Brett was divisional officer for the Association of Scientific, Technical and Managerial Staffs. For the Institution of Professionals, Managers and Specialists, he was Assistant General Secretary from 1980 to 1989 and General Secretary from 1989 to 1999.

Also from 1989 to 1999, he was a member of the executive committee for the Public Services International, and of the General Council of the Trades Union Congress (TUC). Between 1992 and 2003, Brett was member, vice-chairman, chair of the worker group and chair of the Governing body of the International Labour Office (ILO) in Geneva. From 2004, he was director of the ILO in the United Kingdom and Ireland, although the ILO office in London has recently closed down. He was further a member of the Association of Professional, Executive, Clerical and Computer Staff (APEX) from 1960 to 1999. On 20 July 1999, he was made a life peer with the title Baron Brett, of Lydd in the County of Kent.

Brett married firstly Jean Valerie Cooper in 1961. Divorced in 1986, he married secondly Janet Winters in 1994 divorced 2006. He had a son, Martin, and a daughter, Claire, and two grandchildren Lewis and Josh, and two daughters, Judith and Hannah by his second wife.

Lord Brett died on 29 March 2012 after a long illness.

== Works ==
- International Labour in the 21st Century (1994)

Trade union offices
Preceded by Bill McCall	General Secretary of the Institution of Professionals, Managers and Specialists; 1989 – 1999	Succeeded by Paul Noon
