= Society of Technical Civil Servants =

Former trade union of the United Kingdom

The Society of Technical Civil Servants (STCS) was a trade union representing draughtspeople in the civil service of the United Kingdom.

The union was founded in 1907 as the Admiralty Draughtsmen's Association, under the leadership of George Chase. In 1948, it briefly took the name of the Admiralty Technical Association, but later in the year it was joined by the Society of Post Office Engineering Draughtsmen and the Association of Civil Service Designers and Draughtsmen, and became known as the "Society of Technical Civil Servants".

By 1969, the union had a membership of 9,180 people, when it merged into the Institution of Professional Civil Servants.

== General Secretaries ==
1940s: L. B. Whiteman
1949: Cyril Cooper
