= Harry Norton =

British trade union leader

Harry Norton OBE (15 October 1907 – 27 August 1976) was a British trade union leader.

Norton joined the National and Local Government Officers' Association, becoming its Sheffield branch secretary, and winning election to its national executive. In 1944, he moved to the Electrical Power Engineers' Association (EPEA), as its full-time area secretary for Scotland and North East England. He proved successful, and in 1947 was promoted to become the union's National Negotiations Officer, based at its head office, and in 1948 became the union's deputy general secretary.

In 1952, Norton was elected unopposed as general secretary of the EPEA. He began suffering from poor health in the 1970s, and retired in 1973, dying three years later.

In the 1962 Birthday Honours, Norton was made an Officer of the Order of the British Empire.

Trade union offices
Preceded by J. F. Wallace	General Secretary of the Electrical Power Engineers' Association; 1952–1973	Succeeded by John Lyons
