= Bill McCall (trade unionist) =

British trade unionist (1929–2021)

William McCall (6 July 1929 – 15 April 2021) was a British trade union leader.

McCall attended Dumfries Academy before joining the Civil Service in 1946. After a short period studying at Ruskin College, he moved to work for the Social Insurance Department of the Trades Union Congress (TUC) in 1954. Four years later, he joined the Institution of Professional Civil Servants (IPCS) as its Assistant Secretary.

In 1963, McCall was appointed as General Secretary of the IPCS. In this role, he also joined the National Whitley Council for the civil service, chairing it from 1969 to 1971. In 1984, he was elected to the General Council of the TUC, while he also served on the Eastern Electricity Board and the Post Office Arbitration Tribunal.

McCall retired from his trade union posts in 1989, becoming a member of the council of Goldsmiths College, and joining the Police Complaints Authority. In 1994, he joined the council of the University of London, retiring completely in 1997.

He died on 15 April 2021 at the age of 91.

Trade union offices
Preceded by Richard Nunn	General Secretary of the Institution of Professional Civil Servants; 1963 – 1989	Succeeded by Bill Brett
