= Engineers' and Managers' Association =

- Merged into: Prospect
- Founded: 1913
- Dissolved: 2001
- Headquarters: Station House, Chertsey
- Location: United Kingdom
- Members: 48,000 (1980)
- Publication: Electrical Power Engineer
- Affiliations: TUC

The Engineers' and Managers' Association (EMA) was a trade union representing managers in the United Kingdom, principally those in the engineering industry.

The union was founded in 1913 as the Association of Electrical Station Engineers, and before the end of the year changed its name to the Association of Electrical Engineers. In 1917, it became the Electrical Power Engineers' Association (EPEA), and it came to greater prominence the following year, after the Electrical Trades Union was prohibited from negotiating for managers in the electricity industry.

The union joined the Trades Union Congress (TUC) in 1942, but was expelled in 1972 for registering under the Industrial Relations Act, against TUC policy, but it rejoined in 1973.

In 1976, the union decided to recruit managers and engineers from other industries, and the following year, the Association of Supervisory and Executive Engineers joined, the EPEA soon after adopting its final name. In 1979, the British Aerospace Staffs Association and the Professional Staffs Association also joined. This expansion was opposed by the Association of Scientific, Technical and Managerial Staffs, and by the Technical, Administrative and Supervisory Section. The EPEA remained a largely autonomous section of the merged union until 1993.

For many years, the union refused to join the Confederation of Shipbuilding and Engineering Unions, something which prompted criticism from other unions in the field. In 2001. it merged with the Institution of Professionals, Managers and Specialists to form Prospect.

== General Secretaries ==
1920: W. Arthur Jones
1946: James F. Walace
1952: Harry Norton
1973: John Lyons
1991: Tony Cooper
