= Institution of Professionals, Managers and Specialists =

UK trade union

IPMS
- Institution of Professionals, Managers and Specialists
- Merged into: Prospect
- Founded: 1919
- Dissolved: 2001
- Headquarters: 3 Northumberland Street, London
- Location: United Kingdom
- Members: 91,000 (1982)
- Publication: IPCS Bulletin
- Affiliations: TUC, CCSU, PSI

The Institution of Professionals, Managers and Specialists (IPMS) was a trade union representing managers and other people with professional qualifications in the United Kingdom, with a majority of members working in the civil service.

== History ==
The union was founded in 1919 as the Institution of Professional Civil Servants (IPCS), bringing together seventeen associations based in individual departments of the civil service. The spur for its formation was the creation of the Whitley Council system, on which the new union qualified for two seats. Membership grew rapidly, from 1,534 on formation, to 2,917 the following year, reaching 99,000 by 1980.

The union initially operated only as a loose confederation, but in 1946 it established its own National Executive Committee and headquarters, and in 1951, the remaining constituents became branches of the union. At this point, it had strong representation in the Post Office, and it worked as part of the Council of Post Office Unions from 1969 until 1977.

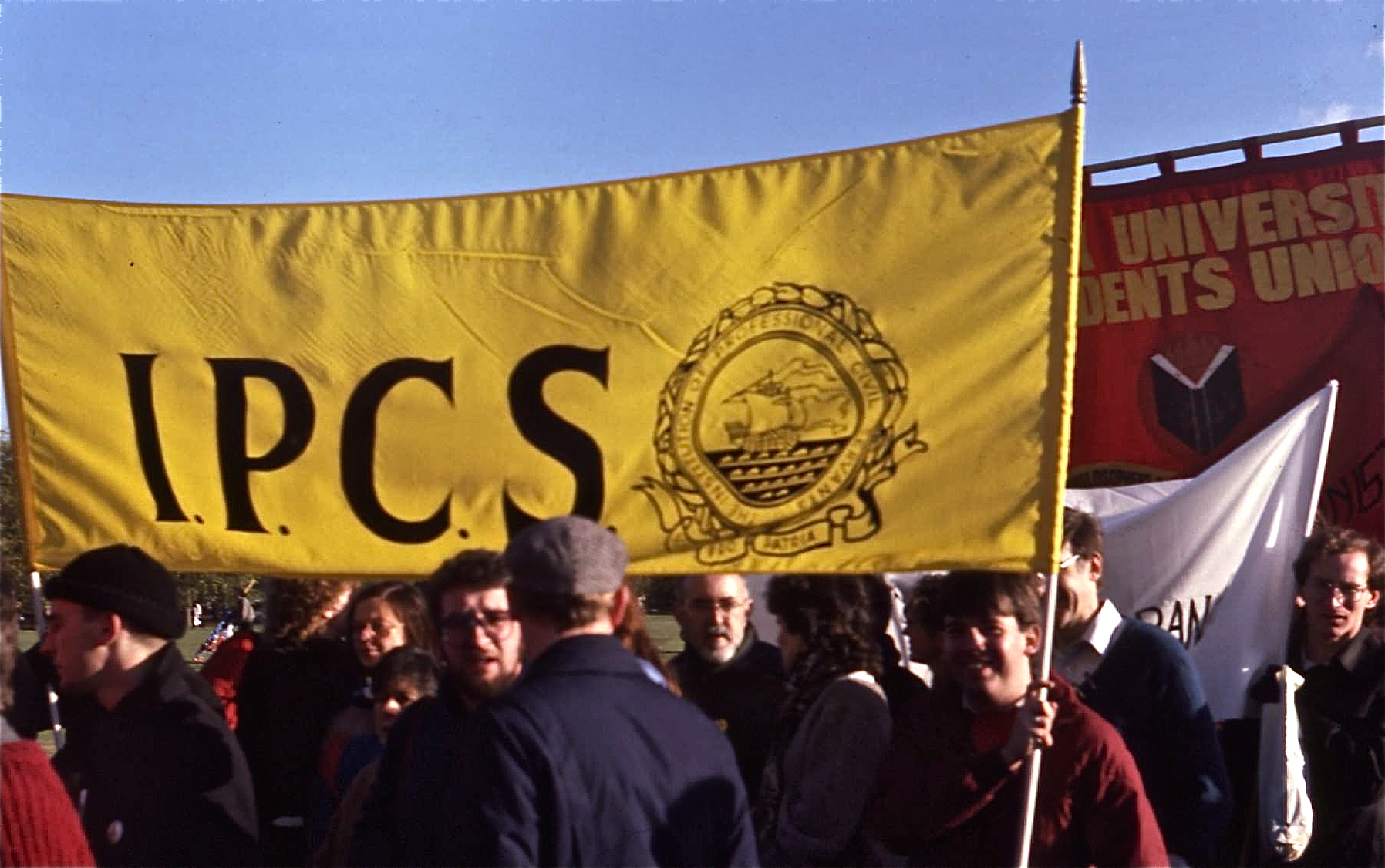
IPCS branch banner 1986 in London on Fowler demo

The union absorbed the Society of Technical Civil Servants in 1969. In 1976, after many attempts to get its members to agree, it joined the Trades Union Congress. In 1984, the Association of Government Supervisors and Radio Operators (AGSRO) joined IPCS.

Following privatisation of the jobs of many of its members, IPCS changed its name to the Institution of Professionals, Managers and Specialists, in 1989. In 2001, it merged with the Engineers' and Managers' Association to form Prospect.

== Leadership ==
=== General Secretaries ===
1945: Leslie Herbert
1948: Stanley Mayne
1961: Richard Nunn
1963: Bill McCall
1989: Bill Brett
1999: Paul Noon

=== Honorary Secretaries ===
1919: R. C. Bristow
1920: J. H. Salmon
1925: Frederick A. A. Menzler
1928: S. H. Bales and H. W. Monroe
1929: S. H. Bales, A. O. Gibbon and H. W. Monroe
1930: S. H. Bales and H. W. Monroe
1935: S. H. Bales
1936: S. H. Bales and H. R. Lintern
1938: Ivor Bowen
1938: H. Whittaker
1939: O. C. Watson
1941: L. Lanham
1942: J. Fraser
1943: G. C. Allfrey
1945: J. A. Nicol
1947: Position abolished

=== Honorary Presidents ===
1921: Richard Redmayne
1957: Graham Sutton
1961: Verney Stott
1963: Position abolished
