= Prospect (trade union) =

United Kingdom trade union

- Prospect
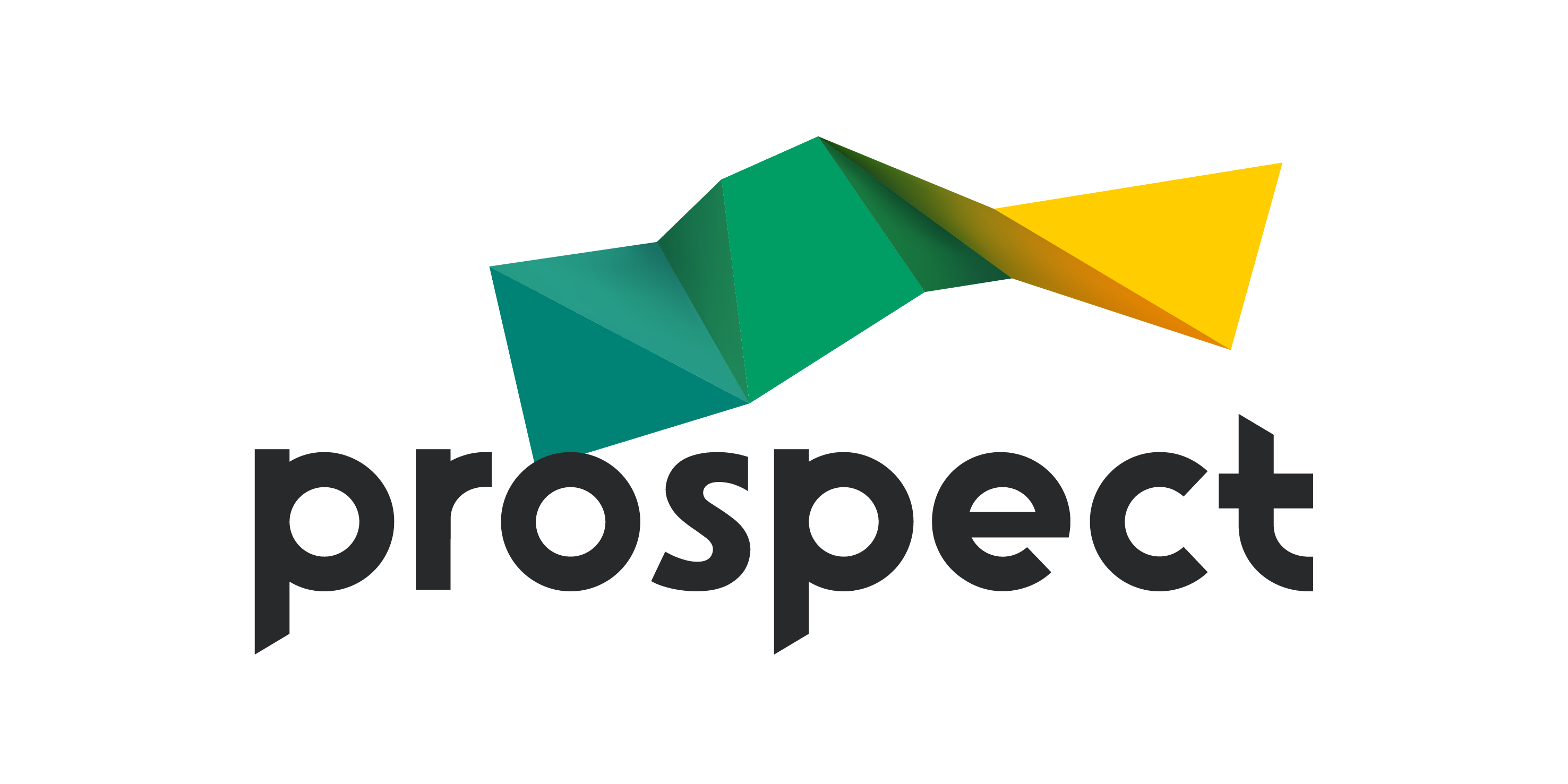
- Founded: November 1, 2001; 25 years ago
- Headquarters: 100 Rochester Row, London, SW1P 1JP
- Location: United Kingdom
- Members: ▲159,377 (2024)
- General Secretary: Mike Clancy
- Affiliations: TUC; ICTU; STUC; ETF; ITF; IFATSEA; CSEU
- Website: prospect.org.uk

Prospect is a United Kingdom trade union which represents engineers, managers, scientists and other specialists in both the public and private sectors.

== History ==
The union was formed on 1 November 2001 by the merger of the Institution of Professionals Managers and Specialists and the Engineers and Managers Association. In 2009, Prospect endorsed a transfer of engagements from the Connect union, the union for managers in the communications sector, which became a part of Prospect on 1 January 2010. It was announced on 30 August 2016 that Bectu members had overwhelmingly voted Yes to transfer its engagements to Prospect which took place on 1 January 2017.

== Membership ==
Prospect members work in engineering, communications/utilities, the civil service, museums and galleries, in a range of public and private organisations including the Met Office, Health and Safety Executive, Trinity House, Babcock, BT Group and the National Trust.

In 2026, the union reached an agreement with Google for an access agreement to comply with recent workplace legislation, which will apply to about 7,000 UK workers, but excluding DeepMind which is negotiating with other unions. A similar agreement had already been made with Meta, which employs about 5,000 UK workers.

== Skills ==
With a largely professional membership, the union has placed a strong emphasis on developing skills and opportunities for career progression. To this end it launched a standalone website called Careersmart in 2014 which provides information and podcasts on a range of subjects from career appraisals and CV writing to mentoring and pensions. Careersmart followed the 2013 launch of Prospect's Apprenticeship App for mobile devices which saw 12,000 downloads in the first year. In 2015 Prospect launched a Gatsby Charitable Foundation-funded project, known as RegTech, to register workplace technicians.
