= List of trade unions in the United Kingdom =

This is a list of trade unions in the United Kingdom formed under UK labour law. The criteria for being an independent trade union, free from employer influence and domination, are set out in Section 5 of the Trade Union and Labour Relations (Consolidation) Act 1992. The body which oversees unions, and awards a certificate of independence for the purpose of collective bargaining is the Trades Union Certification Officer. For the context and history see Trade unions in the United Kingdom.

== Union confederations ==
- Trades Union Congress (TUC)
- Scottish Trades Union Congress (STUC)
- General Federation of Trade Unions (GFTU)
- Irish Congress of Trade Unions (ICTU)

== Trade unions ==
The following is a list of trade unions as designated by the Certification Officer, as of 20 December 2025:

Name	Year est.	Independence Status	Number of members	Key sectors	National affiliation	International affiliation
Accord	1978	Independent	▼21,451 (2024)	Finance / banking	TUC; STUC; A4F	ITUC; ETUC
Advance	1977	Independent	▼5,512 (2024)	Finance / banking	TUC; A4F	ITUC; ETUC
Aegis the Union	1971	Independent	▲4,093 (2024)	Finance / insurance	TUC; STUC; GFTU; A4F	ITUC; ETUC
Affinity	1980	Independent	▲18,574 (2024)	Finance / banking	None	None
App Drivers and Couriers Union	2015	Independent	▲9,205 (2024)	Private transport / gig economy	GFTU	IAATW
Artists' Union England	2014	Independent	▲1,200 (2023)	Entertainment and the arts / museums and art galleries	TUC; GFTU	ITUC; ETUC
Associated Society of Locomotive Engineers and Firemen (ASLEF)	1880	Independent	▲24,782 (2023)	Transportation / trains	TUC; STUC; Labour Party	ITUC; ETUC; ITF; ETF
Association for Laboratory Medicine	1952	Cannot confirm	▲1,407 (2024)	Healthcare science / clinical scientists	None	None
Association of Educational Psychologists	1962	Independent	▲4,256 (2024)	Education / psychologists	TUC; STUC; GFTU	ITUC; ETUC
Association of Flight Attendants	1945	Cannot confirm	▼328 (2024)	Aviation / cabin crew	TUC	ITUC; ETUC; AFA-CWA
Association of Headteachers and Deputes in Scotland	1975	Cannot confirm	▲2,774 (2024)	Education	None	None
Association of Local Authority Chief Executives	1976	Cannot confirm	▲350 (2024)	Local government	None	None
Association of Local Council Clerks	2016	Cannot confirm	▼761 (2021)	Local government	None	None
Association of Revenue and Customs	2005	Independent	▲2,676 (2024)	HMRC staff	FDA	None
Association of School and College Leaders	2006	Cannot confirm	▼24,778 (2024)	Education	None	None
Bakers, Food and Allied Workers Union (BFAWU)	1847	Independent	▲14,645 (2024)	Food production / hospitality / catering	TUC; STUC; GFTU; ICTU	ITUC; ETUC
British Air Line Pilots Association	1937	Independent (Note: Both the TUC and STUC require unions to be independent to be affiliated.)	▲14,375 (2023)	Civil aviation / air transport	TUC; STUC	ITUC; ETUC
British Association of Dental Nurses	1940	Independent	▼4,585 (2024)	Healthcare (dental nursing)	None	None
British Association of Journalists	1992	Independent	▼731 (2023)	Media / journalism	None	None
British Association of Occupational Therapists	1932	Independent	▲36,015 (2024)	Healthcare (occupational therapy)	UNISON	None
British Dental Association	1880	Independent	▼15,698 (2022)	Healthcare (dentistry)	None	None
British Dietetic Association	1936	Independent	▲11,656 (2024)	Healthcare (dietitians)	TUC; STUC	ITUC; ETUC
British Medical Association	1832	Independent	▲194,147 (2024)	Healthcare (doctors)	None	None
British Orthoptic Society Trade Union	1937	Independent	▲1,511 (2024)	Healthcare (orthopists)	STUC	None
Cabin Crew Union	2019	Cannot confirm	▼278 (2022)	Aviation	None	None
Care Workers Union	2025	Non-independent	Not publicly available	Social care	None	None
Chartered Society of Physiotherapy	1894	Independent	▲65,165 (2024)	Healthcare (physiotherapists)	TUC; STUC	ITUC; ETUC
Cleaners and Allied Independent Workers Union	2016	Independent	▲1,830 (2023)	Cleaning / facilities	None	None
Cleaners Union	2025	Non-independent	Not publicly available	Cleaning	None	None
Communication Workers Union	1995	Independent	▼170,324 (2023)	Communications / postal / telecoms / finance	TUC; STUC; GFTU; ICTU; A4F; Labour Party	ITUC; ETUC; UNI
Community	2004	Independent	▼43,595 (2024)	General membership	TUC; STUC; GFTU; A4F; Labour Party	ITUC; ETUC
Confederation of British Surgery	2017	Cannot confirm	▲450 (2024)	Healthcare (surgeons)	None	None
Confederation of Shipbuilding and Engineering Unions	1890	N/A	4 unions (2023)	Engineering / shipbuilding / defence	Unite; GMB; Prospect; Community	None
Criminal Justice Workers Union	2020	Independent	▼1,796 (2023)	Prisons / probation / detention	None	None
Currys Trade Union	2007	Independent	▼2,601 (2024)	Retail - electronics (Currys staff)	None	None
Driver and General Union	2014	Cannot confirm	▲1,193 (2024)	Transport - drivers / logistics	None	None
Educational Institute of Scotland	1847	Independent	▼58,566 (2024)	Education - teachers / lecturers	TUC; STUC	ITUC; ETUC; EI
Empower the Workers' Union	2023	Non-independent	▲271 (2024)	General membership (precarious / low-paid workers)	None	None
Employees General Union	2012	Non-independent	▲27 (2023)	General membership	None	None
Employees United	2011	Non-independent	▲232 (2022)	General membership	None	None
Equal Justice the Union	2021	Non-independent	145 (2023)	General membership	None	None
Equality for Workers Union	2014	Independent	▼3,972 (2024)	General membership	None	None
Equity	1930	Independent	▲48,606 (2024)	Entertainment / performing arts	TUC; STUC; FEU	ITUC; ETUC; FIA
FDA	1919	Independent	▲24,422 (2024)	Public sector - civil service / manager / professionals	TUC; STUC; ICTU	ITUC; ETUC; PSI
Financial Services Union	1918	Independent	▼8,651 (2024)	Finance / banking	ICTU	None
Fire and Rescue Services Association	1976	Independent	▼1,604 (2024)	Firefighters	None	None
Fire Brigades Union	1918	Independent	▼33,717 (2024)	Emergency services - firefighters / fire control staff	TUC; STUC; ICTU; Labour Party	ITUC; ETUC; PSI
Fire Officers' Association	1995	Independent	▼780 (2024)	Emergency services - fire officer / managers	None	None
G4S Care and Justice Services Staff Association	1999	Non-independent	▼1,080 (2023)	Private security / prisons / detention (G4S staff)	None	None
GMB	1924	Independent	▼571,497 (2024)	General membership	TUC; STUC; ICTU; Labour Party	ITUC; ETUC; PSI
Hospital Consultants and Specialists Association	1944	Independent	▼2,894 (2024)	Healthcare - hospital doctors	TUC; STUC; GFTU	ITUC; ETUC
Independent Federation of Nursing in Scotland	1995	Cannot confirm	▼395 (2023)	Healthcare - nurses	None	None
Independent Oxfam Union	2024	Cannot confirm	▲105 (2024)	Charity / NGO (Oxfam workers)	None	None
Independent Pilots Association	1992	Independent	▲1,020 (2024)	Aviation	None	None
Independent Workers' Union of Great Britain	2012	Independent	▲7,380 (2024)	General membership - precarious/migrant workers	None	PI
Industrial Workers of the World	1905	Independent	▼3,332 (2023)	General membership	None	None
International Transport Workers' Federation	1896	Cannot confirm	▼730 (2023)	Transport	None	None
ISU	1981	Independent	▼3,080 (2023)	Public sector - immigration / border services	None	None
Leeds Building Society Colleague Association	2010	Non-independent	▲1,356 (2024)	Finance - building society staff (Leeds Building Society)	A4F	None
Libertas	2024	Non-independent	Not publicly available	General membership	None	None
Locum Doctors' Association	2005	Cannot Confirm	▼447 (2023)	Healthcare - locum doctors	None	None
Musicians' Union	1893	Independent	▲34,563 (2023)	Entertainment	TUC; STUC; GFTU; FEU; Labour Party	ITUC; ETUC
NAPO	1912	Independent	▲6,345 (2024)	Public sector - probation and family courts	TUC; STUC	ITUC; ETUC
National Association of Head Teachers	1897	Independent	▲49,785 (2024)	Education - senior staff	TUC; ICTU	ITUC; ETUC
National Association of Schoolmasters Union of Women Teachers	1976	Independent	▼259,079 (2024)	Education - teachers	TUC; STUC; ICTU	ITUC; ETUC; EI
National Association of Racing Staff	1975	Independent	▼7,809 (2024)	Stable staff / racing grooms	TUC; STUC; ICTU	ITUC; ETUC
National Crime Officers Association	2013	Independent	▲3,666 (2024)	Public sector - law enforcement	None	None
National Education Union	2017	Independent	▼487,420 (2024)	Education - teachers / lecturers	TUC	ITUC; ETUC; EI
National Employees Union	2023	Non-independent	Not publicly available	General Union	None	None
National House Building Council Staff Association	1974	Independent	▼869 (2024)	Construction / housing	None	None
National Society for Education in Art and Design	1888	Independent	▲3,085 (2024)	Education - art and design teachers	TUC	ITUC; ETUC
National Union of Journalists	1907	Independent	▼23,066 (2024)	Journalists / media workers	TUC; STUC; ICTU; FEU	ITUC; ETUC; IFJ
National Union of Mineworkers	1945	Independent	▼196 (2023)	Mining	TUC; STUC; Labour Party	ITUC; ETUC
National Union of Mineworkers - South Wales Area	1945	Independent	▲73 (2024)	Mining	NUM	None
National Union of Professional Foster Carers	2021	Independent	▲1,735 (2024)	Social care - foster carers	None	None
National Union of Rail, Maritime and Transport Workers	1990	Independent	▲80,521 (2024)	Transport - rail / maritime / public transport	TUC; STUC; ICTU	ITUC; ETUC; ITF; ETF; ITWF; WFTU
Nationwide Group Staff Union	1990	Independent	▼12,361 (2024)	Finance (Nationwide staff)	TUC; STUC; A4F	ITUC; ETUC
Nautilus International	2009	Independent	▲19,089 (2024)	Transport - maritime officers / seafarers	TUC; STUC; GFTU	ITUC; ETUC; ITF; IFSMA; FNV
News Union	2000	Cannot confirm	▼1,299 (2024)	Journalists / broadcasters	None	None
North of England Zoological Society Staff Association	2006	Non-independent	▲902 (2024)	Chester Zoo staff	None	None
Palm Paper Staff Association	2008	Non-independent	▼117 (2024)	Manufacturing - paper industry (Palm Paper staff)	None	None
Pharmacists' Defence Association Union	2008	Independent	▲38,024 (2024)	Healthcare - pharmacists	STUC; ICTU; GFTU	None
POA: Professional Trades Union for Prison, Correctional and Secure Psychiatric Workers	1939	Independent	▲36,715 (2024)	Public sector - prison and secure facility staff	TUC; STUC; ICTU; GFTU	ITUC; ETUC
Prison Governors Association	1987	Independent	▲1,079 (2024)	Public sector - prison management	None	None
Professional Cricketers' Association	1967	Independent	▼534 (2023)	Sport -professional cricket players	None	FICA
Professional Footballers' Association	1907	Independent	▲5,834 (2024)	Sport - professional football players	TUC; GFTU	ITUC; ETUC; FIFPRO
Professional Footballers' Association Scotland	2007	Independent	1,618 (2024)	Sport - professional football players	STUC	FIFPRO
Prospect	2001	Independent	▲156,904 (2023)	General professional & technical - civil service / energy /engineering / heritage / telecoms	TUC; STUC; ICTU	ITUC; ETUC; ITF; ETF; ITWF; WFTU
Public and Commercial Services Union	1998	Independent	▼189,399 (2023)	Public sector - civil service and government agencies	TUC; STUC; ICTU; GFTU	ITUC; ETUC; PSI
Psychotherapy and Counselling Union	2016	Cannot confirm	▲962 (2024)	Healthcare - psychotherapy and counselling professionals	GFTU	None
Retail Book Association	1919	Independent	▼706 (2024)	Retail - book and stationery staff	None	None
Royal College of Midwives	1881	Independent	▼48,568 (2023)	Healthcare - midwives	TUC; STUC; ICTU	ITUC; ETUC
Royal College of Nursing	1916	Independent	▲589,717 (2024)	Healthcare - nurses	None	None
Royal College of Podiatry	1945	Independent	▼8,736 (2023)	Healthcare - podiatrists / chiropodists	TUC; GFTU	ITUC; ETUC
RSPB Staff Association	1978	Independent	▲1,216 (2024)	Charityworkers	None	None
Rugby Players' Association	1998	Independent	▼590 (2024)	Sport - professional rugby players	None	None
Sales Staff Association	1988	Independent	▼209 (2024)	Manufacturing / tobacco	None	None
Scottish Artists Union	2001	Independent	▲2,458 (2024)	Arts and culture	STUC	None
Scottish Secondary Teachers Association	1944	Independent	▲5,966 (2024)	Education - secondary school teachers (Scotland)	None	EI
Security Industry Federation	2023	Cannot confirm	▲405 (2024)	Private security workers	GFTU	None
Skyshare	2011	Non-independent	▲635 (2023)	Netjets Europe flight and cabin crew	None	None
Social Workers Union	2011	Independent	▼15,335 (2024)	Social workers	GFTU; BASW	None
Society of Authors	1884	Independent	▲12,390 (2024)	Authors / literary professionals	None	EWC
Society of Radiographers	1920	Independent	▲33,971 (2024)	Radiographers	TUC; STUC; ICTU	ITUC; ETUC
Society of Union Employees	1977	Independent	▼434 (2024)	Trade Union Workers	None	None
Solidarity	2005	Cannot confirm	▼185 (2024)	General Union	None	None
Solid Trade Union	2022	Independent	▲15 (2024)	General union for employees in the North West of England	None	None
Stage Directors UK Union	2015	Cannot confirm	▲471 (2024)	Directors	None	None
Trade Union for Ethnic Minority Social Workers	2021	Cannot confirm	Not publicly available	General union for ethnic minority social workers	None	None
Trades Union Congress (Note: Though listed as a trade union on the COs register, the TUC is actually a confederation with each member listed being a separate affiliated union.)	1868	N/A	48 (2023)	Trade union confederation	TUC	ITUC; ETUC
Transport Salaried Staffs' Association	1897	Independent	▼17,025 (2023)	Transport workers	TUC; STUC; ICTU; GFTU; Labour Party	ITUC; ETUC; ITF; ETF
UK Private Hire Drivers Union	2020	Independent	▲891 (2024)	Private hire drivers	GFTU	None
United Medical Associate Professionals Trade Union	2025	Independent	Not publicly available	Physician associates / anaesthesia associates / surgical care practitioners	None	None
Undeb Cenedlaethol Athrawon Cymru (National Association of Teachers of Wales)	1948	Independent	▲3,644 (2024)	Education (Wales)	TUC	ITUC; ETUC
Union of General and Volunteer Unions	2019	Cannot confirm	▲354 (2024)	Voluntary workers	None	None
Union of Shop, Distributive and Allied Workers	1947	Independent	▲368,563 (2024)	Shop workers	TUC; STUC; Labour Party	ITUC; ETUC
Union Workers' Union	2019	Cannot confirm	▲212 (2023)	Trade union workers	None	None
Unison	1993	Independent	▲1,438,132 (2024)	Public service workers	TUC; STUC; ICTU; Labour Party	ITUC; ETUC; PSI
Unite the Union	2007	Independent	▼1,177,292 (2023)	General union for private sector workers	TUC; STUC; ICTU; CSEU; Labour Party; Labour Party (Ireland)	ITUC; ETUC; PSI
United Road Transport Union	1890	Independent	▼7,557 (2024)	Transportation / distribution	TUC; STUC	ITUC; ETUC
United Voices of the World	2014	Independent	▲3,881 (2024)	Low paid, precarious and migrant workers	None	None
University and College Union	2006	Independent	▼119,785 (2024)	Education	TUC; STUC; ICTU	ITUC; ETUC; EI
Union of Pilots, Engineers and Cabin Crew	2023	Cannot confirm	▲206 (2024)	Aviation	None	None
Walgas	2019	Independent	▼113 (2024)	General trade union	None	None
Warwick International Staff Association	2004 (Note: It is possible that WISA was founded prior to 2004. Please amend if an official founding date can be found.)	Cannot confirm	▲82 (2022)	Warwick Chemicals employees	None	None
Welsh Rugby Players Association	2003	Cannot confirm	▼116 (2023)	Welsh rugby players	None	None
Women's Rugby Association	2021	Cannot confirm	▲125 (2024)	Women rugby players	None	None
Workers of England Union	1970	Cannot confirm	▲8,862 (2024)	General trade union (England)	None	None
Writers' Guild of Great Britain	1959	Independent	▼3,074 (2024)	Writing	TUC; STUC; FEU	ITUC; ETUC; FEU
Yourmate Union	2022	Cannot confirm	Not publicly available	General trade union	None	None

== Historical unions ==
- Altogether Builders' Labourers and Constructional Workers' Society
- Amalgamated Association of Carters and Motormen
- Amalgamated Carters, Lorrymen and Motormen's Union
- Amalgamated Engineering and Electrical Union (AEEU)
- Amalgamated Marine Workers' Union (AMWU)
- Amalgamated Society of Carpenters and Joiners (ASCJ)
- Amalgamated Society of Engineers, Machinists, Millwrights, Smiths and Pattern Makers (ASE)
- Amalgamated Society of Foremen Lightermen of River Thames
- Amalgamated Society of Watermen, Lightermen and Bargemen
- Associated Horsemen's Union
- Association of Cinematograph Television and Allied Technicians (ACTT, now in BECTU)
- Association of Coastwise Masters, Mates and Engineers
- Association of University Teachers AUT
- Association of Principal Fire Officers
- Association of Professional Ambulance Personnel
- Belfast Breadservers' Association
- Belfast Journeymen Butchers' Association
- Belfast Operative Bakers' Union
- British Association of Colliery Management
- British Seafarers' Union (BSU)
- Broadcasting, Entertainment, Cinematograph and Theatre Union
- Burnley, Nelson, Rossendale and District Textile Workers' Union
- Cardiff, Penarth and Barry Coal Trimmers' Union
- Chemical Workers' Union
- Civil and Public Services Association (CPSA)
- Community and Youth Workers' Union
- Confederation of Health Service Employees (COHSE)
- Connect (???–2010) (now in Prospect)
- Cumberland Enginemen, Boilermen and Electrical Workers' Union
- Dock, Wharf, Riverside and General Labourers' Union (DWRGLU)
- Dundee Pilots
- Electricity Supply Staff Association (Dublin)
- Federation of Professional Railway Staff
- File Grinders' Society
- Gibraltar Apprentices and Ex-Apprentices Union
- Gibraltar Confederation of Labour
- Gibraltar Labour Trades Union
- Government Civil Employees' Association
- Grangemouth Pilots' Association
- Greenock Sugar Porters' Association
- Grimsby Steam and Diesel Fishing Vessels Engineers' and Firemen's Union
- Halifax and District Carters' and Motormen's Association
- Humber Amalgamated Steam Trawlers' Engineers, and Firemen's Union
- Imperial War Graves Commission Staff Association
- Institution of Professional Civil Servants
- Irish Mental Hospital Workers' Union
- Irish Union of Hairdressers and Allied Workers
- Iron and Steel Trades Confederation (ISTC)
- Iron, Steel and Wood Barge Builders and Helpers Association
- Labour Protection League
- Leith and Granston Pilots
- Liverpool and District Carters' and Motormen's Union
- London Co-operative Mutuality Club Collectors' Association
- Lurgan Hemmers' Veiners' and General Workers' Union
- Manchester Ship Canal Pilots' Association
- Manufacturing Science and Finance (MSF)
- Methil Pilots
- National Amalgamated Coal Workers' Union
- National Amalgamated Labourers' Union
- National Amalgamated Stevedores' and Dockers' Society
- National Amalgamated Union of Enginemen, Firemen, Mechanics, Motormen and Electrical Workers
- National Association of Colliery Overmen, Deputies and Shotfirers
- National Association of Colliery Overmen, Deputies and Shotfirers (South Wales Area)
- National Association of Local Government Officers (NALGO, now in UNISON)
- National Association of Operative Plasterers
- National Association of Teachers in Further and Higher Education NATFHE (www.natfhe.org.uk). Now amalgamated into the University and College Union (www.ucu.org.uk), along with the AUT
- National Association of Youth Hostel Wardens
- National Federation of SubPostmasters
- National Glass Bottle Makers' Society
- National Glass Workers' Trade Protection Association
- National Union of British Fishermen
- National Union of Agricultural and Allied Workers
- National Union of Civil and Public Servants (NUCPS)
- National Union of Co-operative Insurance Society Employees
- National Union of Dock Labourers (NUDL)
- National Union of Docks, Wharves and Shipping Staffs
- National Union of Dyers, Bleachers and Textile Workers
- National Union of Knitwear, Footwear & Apparel Trades (KFAT)
- Miners' Federation of Great Britain
- National Union of Public Employees (NUPE)
- National Union of Railwaymen (NUR)
- National Union of Seamen (NUS)
- National Union of Shale Miners and Oil Workers
- National Union of Ships' Clerks, Grain Weighers and Coalmeters
- National Union of Ship's Stewards (NUSSCBB)
- National Union of Vehicle Builders
- National Union of Vehicle Workers
- National Winding and General Engineers' Society
- North of England Engineers' and Firemen's Amalgamation
- North of England Trimmers' and Teemers Association
- North of Ireland Operative Butchers' and Allied Workers' Association
- North of Scotland Horse and Motormen's Association
- North Wales Craftsmen and General Workers' Union
- North Wales Quarrymen's Union
- Northern Carpet Trades Union
- Northern Ireland Textile Workers' Union
- Northern Textile and Allied Workers' Union
- Operative Bricklayers' Society (OBS)
- Port of Liverpool Staff Association
- Port of London Deal Porters' Union
- Portadown Textile Workers' Union
- Power Loom Tenters' Trade Union of Ireland
- Process and General Workers' Union
- Radcliffe and District Enginemen and Boilermen's Provident Society
- Scottish Busmen's Union
- Scottish Commercial Motormen's Union
- Scottish Farm Servants' Association
- Scottish Primary Teachers' Association (2011–2012)
- Scottish Seafishers' Union
- Scottish Slaters, Tilers, Roofers and Cement Workers' Society
- Scottish Textile Workers' Union
- Scottish Transport and General Workers' Union (Docks)
- Scottish Union of Dock Labourers (SUDL)
- Sheffield Amalgamated Union of File Trades
- Shield Guarding Staff Association
- Staff Association for Royal Automobile Club Employees
- Staff Association of Bank of Baroda (UK Region)
- SURGE (Skipton Union Representing Group Employees)
- Technical, Administrative and Supervisory Section, now part of Amicus
- Union of Bookmakers Employees
- Union of Kodak Workers
- United Cut Nail Makers of Great Britain Protection Society
- UFS
- United Fishermen's Union
- United Order of General Labourers
- United Vehicle Workers
- Unity
- Watermen, Lightermen, Tugmen and Bargemen's Union
- Weaver Watermen's Association
- Whatman Staff Association
- Workers' Union
- Yorkshire Independent Staff Association

== See also ==
- FTSE 100 and FT 30
- Labour Party (UK) affiliated trade union
- List of hedge funds
- List of largest United Kingdom employers
- List of students' unions in the United Kingdom
- List of trade unions in Germany
- List of trade unions in the United States
- List of Transport and General Workers' Union amalgamations
- List of unions
- Teachers' trade unions in the United Kingdom
- Trade Union and Labour Party Liaison Organisation
- UK labour law
