= List of Transport and General Workers' Union amalgamations =

The Transport and General Workers Union (TGWU) was created in 1922 from a merger of fourteen unions and continued to grow through a series of mergers, amalgamations and transfers of engagements. This process, which is recorded below in chronological order, continued through to 2007 when the TGWU itself merged with Amicus to form a new union called UNITE.

== 1920s ==
=== Founding Members ===
- Amalgamated Society of Watermen, Lightermen and Bargemen
- Amalgamated Carters, Lurrymen and Motormen's Union
- Amalgamated Association of Carters and Motormen
- Associated Horsemen's Union
- Dock, Wharf, Riverside and General Labourers' Union
- Labour Protection League
- National Amalgamated Labourers' Union
- National Union of Docks, Wharves and Shipping Staffs
- National Union of Ships' Clerks, Grain Weighers and Coalmeters
- National Union of Vehicle Workers
- National Amalgamated Coal Workers' Union
- North of England Trimmers' and Teemers Association
- North of Scotland Horse and Motormen's Association
- United Vehicle Workers

=== Later 1922 ===
- National Union of Dock, Riverside and General Workers
- Scottish Union of Dock Labourers
- National Union of British Fishermen
- Greenock Sugar Porters' Association

=== 1923 ===
- North Wales Craftsmen and General Workers' Union
- North Wales Quarrymen's Union

=== 1924 ===
- Belfast Breadservers' Trade Union
- United Order of General Labourers

=== 1925 ===
- Association of Coastwise Masters, Mates and Engineers
- Weaver Watermen's Association

=== 1926 ===
- Irish Mental Hospital Workers' Union
- National Amalgamated Union of Enginemen, Firemen, Mechanics, Motormen and Electrical Workers

=== 1928 ===
- Cumberland Enginemen, Boilermen and Electrical Workers' Union

=== 1929 ===
- Public Works and Constructional Operatives' Union (Staffordshire District)
- Workers' Union

== 1930s ==
=== 1930 ===
- Belfast Operative Bakers' Union
- Northern Ireland Textile Workers' Union

=== 1933 ===
- Portadown Textile Workers' Union
- Scottish Farm Servants' Union
- London Co-operative Mutuality Club Collectors' Association

=== 1934 ===
- National Union of Co-operative Insurance Society Employees
- Scottish Busmen's Union
- Altogether Builders' Labourers and Constructional Workers' Society

=== 1935 ===
- National Winding and General Engineers' Society

=== 1936 ===
- Electricity Supply Staff Association (Dublin)
- Halifax and District Carters' and Motormen's Association

=== 1937 ===
- Power Loom Tenters' Trade Union of Ireland
- Belfast Journeymen Butchers' Association
- Scottish Seafishers' Union

=== 1938 ===
- Humber Amalgamated Steam Trawlers' Engineers, and Firemen's Union
- Imperial War Graves Commission Staff Association
- Port of London Deal Porters' Union

=== 1939 ===
- North of England Engineers' and Firemen's Amalgamation

== 1940s ==
=== 1940 ===
- National Glass Workers' Trade Protection Association
- Radcliffe and District Enginemen and Boilermen's Provident Society
- National Glass Bottle Makers' Society

=== 1943 ===
- Manchester Ship Canal Pilots' Association

=== 1944 ===
- Grangemouth Pilots' Association

=== 1945 ===
- Leith and Granston Pilots
- Dundee Pilots
- Methil Pilots

=== 1947 ===
- Government Civil Employees' Association
- Liverpool and District Carters' and Motormen's Union

== 1950s ==
=== 1951 ===
- Lurgan Hemmers' Veiners' and General Workers' Union

=== 1952 ===
- United Cut Nail Makers of Great Britain Protection Society

== 1960s ==
=== 1961 ===
- Scottish Textile Workers' Union

=== 1962 ===
- National Union of Shale Miners and Oil Workers

=== 1963 ===
- Gibraltar Confederation of Labour
- Gibraltar Apprentices and Ex-Apprentices Union
- Gibraltar Labour Trades Union

=== 1965 ===
- North of Ireland Operative Butchers' and Allied Workers' Association
- United Fishermen's Union

=== 1967 ===
- Cardiff, Penarth and Barry Coal Trimmers' Union

=== 1968 ===
- National Association of Operative Plasterers
- Scottish Slaters, Tilers, Roofers and Cement Workers' Society

=== 1969 ===
- Amalgamated Society of Foremen Lightermen of River Thames
- Irish Union of Hairdressers and Allied Workers
- Port of Liverpool Staff Association
- Process and General Workers' Union

== 1970s ==
=== 1970 ===
- Sheffield Amalgamated Union of File Trades

=== 1971 ===
- Scottish Commercial Motormen's Union
- Watermen, Lightermen, Tugmen and Bargemen's Union
- Chemical Workers' Union

=== 1972 ===
- National Union of Vehicle Builders
- Scottish Transport and General Workers' Union (Docks)

=== 1973 ===
- Iron, Steel and Wood Barge Builders and Helpers Association

=== 1974 ===
- Union of Bookmakers Employees
- Union of Kodak Workers

=== 1975 ===
- File Grinders' Society

=== 1976 ===
- Grimsby Steam and Diesel Fishing Vessels Engineers' and Firemen's Union

=== 1978 ===
- National Association of Youth Hostel Wardens
- Staff Association for Royal Automobile Club Employees

== 1980s ==
=== 1982 ===
- National Union of Agricultural and Allied Workers
- National Amalgamated Stevedores' and Dockers' Society
- National Union of Dyers, Bleachers and Textile Workers

=== 1984 ===
- Burnley, Nelson, Rossendale and District Textile Workers' Union
- Northern Textile and Allied Workers' Union
- Sheffield Sawmakers' Protection Society

=== 1987 ===
- Amalgamated Union of Asphalt Workers
- National Tile, Faience and Mosaic Fixers' Society

== 1990s ==
=== 1993 ===
- Lancashire Box, Packing Case and General Woodworkers' Society
- Yorkshire Association of Power Loom Overlookers

=== 1995 ===
- Electrical and Plumbing Industries Union

=== 1997 ===
- National Association of Licensed House Managers

== 2000s ==
=== 2000 ===
- Northern Carpet Trades Union

=== 2004 ===
- National Union of Lock and Metal Workers

=== 2006 ===
- Community and Youth Workers' Union

=== 2007 ===
In 2007 the T&G merged with Amicus to form Unite.

== See also ==
- List of trade unions
