= Amalgamated (organization name) =

In the business world, amalgamated refers to an organization that has undergone consolidation (also known as amalgamation). Amalgamated organizations may use "amalgamated" in their name to signify that it is the amalgamation of its component companies or trade unions.

== North America ==
- Amalgamated Bank, a union-owned bank based in New York City
- Amalgamated Bank of Chicago, a bank founded in 1923 by the ACWA and now owned by UNITE HERE
- Amalgamated Lithographers of America
- Amalgamated Sugar Company
- Amalgamated Transit Union, a United States and Canada based union
- Amalgamated Advertising
- Dominica Amalgamated Workers' Union
- Amalgamated Workers Union, a trade union in Trinidad and Tobago

=== Since disbanded or further amalgamated ===
- Amalgamated Association of Iron and Steel Workers, a historical trade union
- Amalgamated Clothing Workers of America
- Amalgamated Machinery Corporation, manufacturers of the Amalgamated
- Amalgamated Meat Cutters, a North American trade union

== United Kingdom ==
- Chesham Amalgamations, a British mergers and acquisitions broking company
- Amalgamated Anthracite Holdings Limited

=== Since disbanded or further amalgamated ===
- Amalgamated Engineering and Electrical Union, a historical British trade union (formerly known as the Amalgamated Society of Engineers)
- Amalgamated Marine Workers' Union
- Associated Motor Cycles, briefly known as "Amalgamated Motor Cycles Ltd"
- MGM-British Studios, previously "Amalgamated Studios"
- Amalgamated Society of Carpenters and Joiners, a British organisation formed during the 1860s
- Amalgamated Union of Building Trade Workers
- Anglo-Amalgamated, a British film production company from the 1930s to the 1970s, responsible for some of the early "Carry On" films
- Fleetway Publications, formerly known as "Amalgamated Press".
- Amalgamated Association of Brass Turners, Fitters, Finishers and Coppersmiths
- Amalgamated Slaters', Tilers' and Roofing Operatives' Society
- Amalgamated Society of Tailors and Tailoresses
- Amalgamated Society of Foremen Lightermen of River Thames
- Transport and General Workers' Union, formerly known as the Amalgamated Association of Carters and Motormen
- Amalgamated Carters, Lurrymen and Motormen's Union
- Amalgamated Engineering and Electrical Union
- Amalgamated Marine Workers' Union
- Amalgamated Society of Watermen, Lightermen and Bargemen
- Amalgamated Society of House Decorators and Painters
- Amalgamated Society of Coopers
- Amalgamated Society of Painters and Decorators
- Amalgamated Society of Lithographic Printers
- Amalgamated Society of Dyers, Finishers and Kindred Trades
- Amalgamated Weavers' Association
- Cardroom Amalgamation
- Irish Bakers' National Amalgamated Union
- Humber Amalgamated Steam Trawler Engineers and Firemen's Union
- National Amalgamated Stevedores and Dockers
- National Amalgamated Union of Enginemen, Firemen, Mechanics, Motormen and Electrical Workers
- National Amalgamated Labourers' Union
- National Amalgamated Coal Workers' Union
- National Amalgamated Association of Tin Plate Workers
- North East Lancashire Amalgamated Weavers' Association
- Sheffield Amalgamated Union of File Trades

== Eastern Europe ==
- Association of Amalgamated Territorial Communities

== Asia and Oceania ==
- Amalgamated Engineering Union
- Amalgamated Holdings
- Amalgamated Wireless Australasia
- Central Amalgamated Workers' Union
- Northern Amalgamated Workers' Union
- Southern Amalgamated Workers' Union

== Botswana ==
- Botswana Railways Amalgamated Workers' Union
- National Amalgamated Central, Local & Parastatal Manual Workers' Union, a Botswana-based organisation

== In fiction ==
- A large corporation called Consolidated Amalgamated figures in the plots of two films by Peter Hyams: Capricorn One (1978) and Outland (1981).
- Amalgamated Fluorodynamics is a fictional company in the Half-Life mod Science and Industry
