= Outline of the fishing industry =

Overview of and topical guide to the fishing industry

The following outline is provided as an overview of and topical guide to the fishing industry:

Fishing industry – includes any industry or activity concerned with taking, culturing, processing, preserving, storing, transporting, marketing or selling fish, fish products or shellfish. It is defined by the FAO as including recreational, subsistence and commercial fishing, and the harvesting, processing, and marketing sectors.

== Essence of the fishing industry ==
- Fishing industry
- Commercial fishing
- Fish farming
- Fish processing
- Fish products
- Fish marketing
- Fishing by country
- Fishing communities
- Fishing banks
- Other areas
- World fish production
- Work in Fishing Convention 2007
- Sustainable fishery

== Commercial fishing ==
- Commercial fishing
- Trawling
- Seine fishing
- Longline fishing
- Troll (angling)
- Scallop dredge
- Trepanging
- Lobster fishing
- Alaskan king crab fishing
- Artisan fishing
- Fishing vessel
- Blast fishing

=== Trawling ===
- Trawling
- Pair trawling
- Bottom trawling
- Midwater trawling
- Commercial trawler
- Naval trawler
- recreational

== Fish processing ==
- Fish processing
- Fish processing facility
- Factory ship
- Fish preservation
- Slurry ice
- Fish flake
- Gibbing
- Dried and salted cod
- Stockfish
- Dried shrimp
- Allan McLean

== Fish products ==
- Fish products
- Seafood
- Roe
- Fish meal
- Fish emulsion
- Fish hydrolysate
- fish oil
- fish sauce
- Seafood
- Edible crustaceans
- Edible mollusks

== Fish marketing ==
- Fish marketing
- Live food fish trade
- shrimp marketing
- Fish market
- Chasse-marée

=== Fish markets ===
- Fish market
- Billingsgate Fish Market
- Fulton Fish Market
- Maine Avenue Fish Market
- Princes Street Market (Cork)
- Scania Market
- Tsukiji fish market

== Fish types ==
- Fish (food)
- Finfish
- Shellfish
  - Crustaceans
  - Echinoderms
  - Mollusks
- Demersal fish
- Bottom feeder
- Groundfish
- Whitefish
- Oily fish
- Rough fish

=== Commercial finfish ===
- Anchovy
- Beluga sturgeon
- Catfish
- Cod
- Atlantic cod
- Eel
- Eel history
- Halibut
- Herring
- Mackerel
- Salmon
- Sardine
- Sole
- Sturgeon
- White sturgeon
- Tilapia
- Patagonian toothfish
- Tuna
- Turbot
- Whitebait
- More commercial finfish...

=== Commercial crustaceans ===
- Crab fisheries
- Crayfish fisheries
- Krill
- Lobster fisheries
- Shrimp fishery

=== Commercial molluscs ===
- Shellfish
- Abalone
- Clam
- Cockles
- Periwinkle
- Mussels
- Oysters
- Scallops
- Whelk

== Fishing by country ==
- Fishing by country
- Alaska
- Angola
- Bangladesh
- Canada
- Chad
- Chile
- Ghana
- Ethiopia
- India
- Israel
- Japan
- Scotland
- Uganda

== Fishing communities ==
- Bhoi
- Cullercoats
- Gilleleje
- Hovden
- Kolis
- Macassan contact with Australia
- Mogaveeras
- Polperro
- Culture of Póvoa de Varzim
- St. Abbs
- Sørvágur
- Tilting
- Food of the Tlingit
- more...

== Fishing disasters ==
- Stotfield fishing disaster
- Eyemouth disaster
- Moray Firth fishing disaster
- 2004 Morecambe Bay cockling disaster
- 1959 Escuminac Hurricane
- 1996 Jorlinda R. Digal

== Fishing banks ==
- Agulhas Bank
- Chatham Rise
- Dogger Bank
- Flemish Cap
- Georges Bank
- Grand Banks
- Hawkins Bank
- Macclesfield Bank
- Nazareth Bank
- Princess Alice Bank
- Saya de Malha Bank
- Soudan Banks

== Fishing industry organizations ==
=== Fishing industry trade unions ===
- Fish, Food and Allied Workers Union
- Fishermen's Protective Union
- Grimsby Steam and Diesel Fishing Vessels Engineers' and Firemen's Union
- Humber Amalgamated Steam Trawler Engineers and Firemen's Union
- National Union of British Fishermen
- Scottish Seafishers' Union
- United Fishermen and Allied Workers' Union
- United Fishermen's Union

== See also ==
- Outline of agriculture
  - Outline of fishing
  - Outline of fisheries
