= Textile Workers' Union =

The Textile Workers' Union is the name of:

- Amalgamated Textile Workers' Union, in Great Britain
- Australian Textile Workers' Union
- Coimbatore District Textile Workers Union, in India
- Danish Textile Workers' Union
- Northern Ireland Textile Workers' Union
- Portadown Textile Workers' Union, in Northern Ireland
- Scottish Textile Workers' Union
- Textile Workers' Union (Finland)
- Textile Workers Union of America
