= National Transport Workers' Federation =

Association of British trade unions

The National Transport Workers' Federation (NTWF) was an association of British trade unions. It was formed in 1910 to co-ordinate the activities of various organisations catering for dockers, seamen, tramwaymen and road transport workers.

== History ==
The NTWF had some success as an organisational tool and as a symbol of trade union unity, but since its member unions retained full control over their own affairs it was not always able to have a direct influence on trade disputes. One of its members William Ball, was the subject of a pamphlet 'Torture in an English Prison' about his treatment as a male union supporter of women's right to vote in 1911. In 1912, it called a National Dock Strike in support of London dockers which was observed only in a few centres, and which ended within a week. This was regarded as an embarrassing setback, and led the Federation to adopt a more cautious approach in subsequent years. In 1921 it was criticised for failing to bring out its members in support of the miners in the Black Friday crisis.

The NTWF laid the foundations for the creation of the Transport and General Workers Union (TGWU) in 1922. The TGWU initially affiliated, but left in 1923, and the federation accomplished little thereafter, dissolving in 1927.

== Affiliates ==
In 1918, the federation's affiliates were:

- Amalgamated Association of Carters and Motormen
- Amalgamated Association of Tramway and Vehicle Workers
- Amalgamated Carters', Lurrymen's and Motormen's Union
- Amalgamated Protective Union of Engine Drivers, Crane Drivers, Hydraulic and Boiler Attendants
- Amalgamated Society of Watermen, Lightermen and Bargemen
- Amalgamated Stevedores' Labour Protection League
- Cardiff, Penarth and Barry Coal Trimmers' Union
- Dock, Wharf, Riverside and General Workers' Union
- Glasgow Ship Riggers' Protective Association
- Hull Seamen's Union
- Labour Protection League
- London and Provincial Union of Licensed Vehicle Workers
- Liverpool and District Carters' and Motormen's Union
- Mersey River and Canal Watermen's Association
- National Amalgamated Labourers' Union
- National Amalgamated Union of Enginemen, Firemen, Mechanics, Motormen and Electrical Workers
- National Amalgamated Union of Labour
- National Seamen's and Firemen's Union
- National Union of Dock Labourers
- National Union of General Workers
- National Union of Ship's Stewards, Cooks, Butchers and Bakers
- National Union of Vehicle Workers
- National Warehouse and General Workers' Union
- Northwich Amalgamated Society of Salt Workers, Rock Salt Miners, Alkali Workers, Mechanics and General Labourers
- Scottish Horse and Motormen's Association
- Scottish Union of Dock Labourers
- United Carters' and Motormen's Association
- United Order of General Labourers
- United Society of Boiler Scalers
- Weaver Watermen's Association

== Leadership ==
=== Presidents ===
1910: Harry Gosling
1924:

=== Secretaries ===
1910: James Anderson
1912: Robert Williams
1925: Frederick James Maynard
