= Joseph Forbes Duncan =

Scottish trade unionist and politician

Joseph Forbes Duncan (3 June 1879 – 1 December 1964) was a Scottish trade unionist and politician.

Born in Boat of Bridge in Banffshire, Duncan grew up in Ruthriston near Aberdeen and was educated at Robert Gordon's College. He left school aged fifteen then, when he was seventeen, moved to London to work for the Post Office. However, he suffered from poor health, and moved back to Scotland in 1898, finding work in Aberdeen. While there, he became politically active, joining the local Clarion Club, and lecturing on Marxism.

In 1904, Duncan took up the general secretaryship of the Scottish Steam Vessels Enginemen's and Firemen's Union (SSVEFU); he led it through two strikes, in 1905 and 1907, but both took place against his wishes and achieved little. The union delegated him to attend the Aberdeen Trades Council (ATC), and through this sat on various town council committees, and also the executive of the Scottish Workers' Representation Committee. This inspired him to join both the Fabian Society, and the Independent Labour Party (ILP), almost immediately being appointed as its full-time secretary for the East of Scotland. However, he found the travel involved in this post lonely, and returned to working for the SSVEFU full-time in 1908.

Duncan became chairman of the Aberdeen Trades Council in 1911, in which role he helped refound the National Union of Dock Labourers and establish a local branch of the Domestic Servants' Union. Most significantly, he founded the Scottish Farm Servants' Union, and became its secretary, this becoming a full-time post in 1918.

Duncan opposed World War I, but served on the Scottish Departmental Committee on Food Production; through this, he managed to obtain exemption from being conscripted. He stood for the Labour Party (to which the ILP was affiliated) at the 1919 Aberdeenshire and Kincardineshire Central by-election, taking 26.4% of the vote but only managing third place. Later, he also stood unsuccessfully in Moray and Nairn at the 1929 general election, and in the 1935 Aberdeen South by-election.

Duncan was the secretary of the Farm Servants throughout the inter-war period, finally retiring in 1945. He served on a number of government committees, and in 1926 was the chairman of the Scottish Trades Union Congress. He championed land nationalisation, but was generally considered to be on the right wing of the ILP, and one of James Maxton's leading opponents in the Scottish branch of the party. He was President of the International Land Workers' Federation from the 1920s until 1950.

Trade union offices
Preceded by Walter Smith	President of the International Landworkers' Federation; 1924–1950	Succeeded by Edwin Gooch
Preceded by William Leonard	President of the Scottish Trades Union Congress; 1926	Succeeded by Peter Webster
