= Lurry =

Lurry is an old-fashioned spelling of Lorry. Wikipedia articles include:

- Lorry (horse-drawn)
- Amalgamated Carters, Lurrymen and Motormen's Union

== See also ==
- Lurrie Bell
