= SPTA =

SPTA may refer to

- Salisbury Plain Training Area
- Scottish Primary Teachers' Association
- Spectrin, alpha 1
