= National Union of Co-operative Insurance Society Employees =

Former trade union of the United Kingdom

The National Union of Co-operative Insurance Society Employees (NUCISE) was a trade union in the United Kingdom.

The union split from the recently formed National Union of Distributive and Allied Workers in 1922. It affiliated with the Transport and General Workers' Union in 1933, merging in 1982.

== See also ==
- List of trade unions
- Transport and General Workers' Union
- TGWU amalgamations
