= Harry Urwin =

British trade unionist

Charles Henry Urwin (24 February 1915 – 10 February 1996) was a British trade unionist.

Born in Witton Gilbert, County Durham, Urwin began work at a local coal mine at the age of fourteen, but left three years later, moving to Coventry to become a welder. He also joined the Transport and General Workers' Union (TGWU), and soon became a shop steward for his workplace.

In 1947, Urwin became secretary of the TGWU's Coventry district, succeeding Jack Jones. This was a full-time post, and he worked closely with Jones, striking up a life-long friendship. In 1959, Urwin became the regional officer, based in Birmingham, then West Midlands secretary in 1963. In 1969 when Jones became the TGWU's general secretary, he made Urwin his assistant, then later created the role of deputy general secretary for Urwin.

Urwin was elected to the general council of the Trades Union Congress (TUC), where he proved highly influential despite being one of its few members not to lead a union. He was also active in the Labour Party, and served on the Manpower Services Commission, National Enterprise Board and Energy Commission during the late 1970s, then the Advisory, Conciliation, and Arbitration Service from 1979.

Jones retired in 1978, and Urwin followed him into retirement in 1980, living in Walsall until his death in 1996.

Trade union offices
Preceded by Harry Nicholas	Assistant General Secretary of the Transport and General Workers' Union; 1968 – 1974	Succeeded by Position abolished
Preceded by New position	Deputy General Secretary of the Transport and General Workers' Union; 1974 – 1980	Succeeded by Alec Kitson
