= National Union of Shale Miners and Oil Workers =

Former trade union of the United Kingdom

- Merged into: Transport and General Workers' Union
- Founded: 1886
- Dissolved: 1962
- Location: United Kingdom
- Members: 1,500 (1946)
- Affiliations: Labour

The National Union of Shale Miners and Oil Workers was a trade union in the United Kingdom. It merged with the Transport and General Workers' Union in 1962.

== History ==
The Scottish Shale Miners and Manual Workers' Union was founded in 1886 by John Wilson of Broxburn, who led it until his death in 1912. It affiliated to the Scottish Miners' Federation in the 1890s, but left in 1922 to become independent once more. Wilson was succeeded by Robert Small.

In 1924, the Shale Miners merged with the Scottish Oil Workers' Union. This was founded in 1900 with only 230 members, but had grown consistently until it had 1,800 members in 1923. The new union was named the "National Union of Shale Miners and Oil Workers", and it survived until 1962, when its members transferred to the Transport and General Workers Union.

== See also ==
- List of trade unions
- Transport and General Workers' Union
- TGWU amalgamations
