= South Side Labour Protection League =

Former trade union of the United Kingdom

- Predecessor: Labour Protection League
- Merged into: Transport and General Workers' Union
- Founded: 1889
- Dissolved: 1922
- Headquarters: Neptune Street, Rotherhithe
- Location: England
- Members: 5,500 (1920)
- Key people: Harry Quelch (Gen Sec)
- Affiliations: TUC, NTWF

The South Side Labour Protection League was a trade union organising dock porters and stevedores in the United Kingdom.

Until the mid-1880s, dock porters in the docks on the south side of the River Thames in London were represented by the Labour Protection League. However, the union had increasingly come to focus its attention on stevedores, and when its executive changed the union's name to the "Amalgamated Stevedores' Labour Protection League", this led the remaining dock porters to leave.

Inspired by the London Dock Strike of 1889, the former members of the Labour Protection League formed a new union, the South Side Labour Protection League, led by Harry Quelch. It was highly decentralised, allowing it to recruit general labourers and workers in a variety of dockside trades, while each trade was able to maintain its own conditions of entry and traditions.

By 1912, the union's twenty branches included:

- Corn Porters
- Crane Drivers, Steam and Hydraulic Boiler Attendants
- South Side
- Thames Steamship Workers

In later years, the union began admitting members working on the north bank of the Thames, particularly in Poplar, and it therefore shortened its name to the Labour Protection League. By 1920, it had 5,500 members, and it agreed to take part in the merger which formed the Transport and General Workers' Union in 1922.

== General Secretaries ==
1889: Harry Quelch
1890s: Arthur Harris
1920: Peter Hubbart

== See also ==
- List of trade unions
- Transport and General Workers' Union
- TGWU amalgamations
