= List of largest United Kingdom employers =

This list of largest United Kingdom employers includes public sector bodies; public listed companies (plc) such as those on the FTSE 100 Index; private companies (ltd), partnerships (often LLP) or other traders; and charitable sector organisations.

== Public sector employers ==
Partial statistics for public bodies are available from the Office for National Statistics. As of September 2018, public sector employees represent 16.5% of all people in paid work, with the remaining 83.5% employed in the private sector.

Employer	Est.	Sector	Employees
NHS England	1948	Health	1,400,000
NHS Scotland	1948	Health	160,000
Department for Work and Pensions	2001	Welfare	84,550
British Army	1660	Military	109,086
HM Revenue & Customs	2005	Taxation	76,890
NHS Wales	1948	Healthcare	72,000
Ministry of Justice	2007	Law	68,670
Ministry of Defence	1940	Military	65,000
Metropolitan Police Service	1829	Police	50,000 (approx.)
Network Rail	2002	Transport	42,206 (2020)
Royal Air Force	1918	Military	37,200
Royal Navy	1546	Military	36,320
BBC	1927	Media	23,000
Home Office	1782	Security, immigration, etc.	25,850
Scottish Government	1999	Devolved government	17,000
Department for Transport	2002	Transport	17,640
Welsh Government	1999	Devolved government	5,682
Parliament of the United Kingdom	1707	Political representation	1,475

== Public listed company employers ==
Statistics are available on an ad hoc basis from public company annual reports.

Currently Tesco and Compass Group are the largest plc employers.

== Private company employers ==
Statistics on staff numbers were compiled in the Sunday Times' "Top Track 100" of private companies for 2012. The three largest private employers in that list were John Lewis Partnership, Swire Group and Alliance Boots.

== See also ==
- United Kingdom labour law
- British company law
- FT 30
- List of trade unions in the United Kingdom
- List of largest employers
- List of German companies by employees in 1938
- List of German companies by employees in 1907
- List of private equity firms
- List of corporate collapses and scandals
