= Irish Mental Hospital Workers' Union =

Irish labour union

The Irish Mental Hospital Workers' Union was a trade union in Ireland. It was formed in 1912 as a split from the National Asylum Workers' Union, and it merged with the Transport and General Workers' Union in 1926.

== History ==
The Irish Mental Hospital Workers' Union (Known at first as the Irish Asylum Workers' Union) was founded in 1917 in Dublin. Its peak years of activity were between 1917 and 1921. Amongst its greatest achievements was the negotiation of national minimum conditions of employment in 1920. Under this agreement asylum workers' hours were reduced to 56 hours a week (in some cases staff had been working up to 90 hours a week) and a minimum wage of £60 for men and £46 for women was introduced. Ultimately the union began to fracture from 1922 with onset of the post War slump. Some branches amalgamated with the Irish Transport and General Worker's Union whilst others later joined the Amalgamated Transport and General Workers' Union. By 1926 the last of these amalgamations had occurred.

== See also ==
- List of trade unions
- Transport and General Workers' Union
- TGWU amalgamations
