= Watermen, Lightermen, Tugmen and Bargemen's Union =

Former trade union of the United Kingdom

The Watermen, Lightermen, Tugmen and Bargemen's Union was a trade union in the United Kingdom.

The union was formed in 1925 when the watermen and lightermen belonging to the National Amalgamated Stevedores, Lightermen, Watermen and Dockers decided to secede and form their own union. It merged with the Transport and General Workers' Union in 1971.

== See also ==
- List of trade unions
- Transport and General Workers' Union
- TGWU amalgamations
- Labour Protection League
