= National Glass Workers' Trade Protection Association =

Former trade union of the United Kingdom

The National Glass Workers' Trade Protection Association was a trade union in the United Kingdom.

The union was founded in 1920, when the Yorkshire Glass Bottle Makers' United Trade Protection Society merged with the majority of the National Glass Bottle Makers' Society. Based in Castleford, it merged with the Transport and General Workers' Union in 1940.

== General Secretaries ==
1920: John Thompson
1924: R. Fenton
