= Scottish Farm Servants' Union =

Former Scottish trade union

- Merged into: Transport and General Workers' Union
- Founded: 1912
- Dissolved: 1933
- Headquarters: Aberdeen, Stirling
- Location: Scotland
- Members: 10,817 (1926)
- Key people: Joseph Forbes Duncan

The Scottish Farm Servants' Union was a trade union in the United Kingdom.

The organisation was founded in 1912, when a group of farm labourers from Turriff asked the Aberdeen Trades Council to help them form a union. Joseph Forbes Duncan, secretary of the trades council, threw himself into this, organising meetings across the county, and within a few weeks, he established the union, with 1,000 members in nine local branches.

Initially, Gavin Brown Clark served as the union's president, and Duncan was vice-president. In 1915, it was decided to appoint an honorary secretary, and Duncan won election to the post. Three years later, the headquarters were moved to Stirling, and Duncan became the full-time general secretary.

The union was registered in 1913 with a membership of 7,477, increasing to 10,817 in 1926. Although its membership never amounted to more than one third of farm workers in Scotland, it became the leading voice for them.

Membership of the union fell during the recession of the early 1930s, and it was decided to affiliate to the Transport and General Workers Union (TGWU) in 1934. The union remained a separate section of the TGWU, with Duncan as its secretary until 1945.

The union published a journal, Scottish Farm Servant.

== See also ==
- List of trade unions
- Transport and General Workers' Union
- TGWU amalgamations
