= Belfast Journeymen Butchers' Association =

Trade union in the United Kingdom

The Belfast Journeymen Butchers' Association was a trade union in the United Kingdom. The union was established in 1891 and grew to a peak membership of 190 in 1910. It merged with the Amalgamated Transport and General Workers' Union (ATGWU) in 1937.

== See also ==
- Transport and General Workers' Union
- TGWU amalgamations
