= Sheffield Sawmakers' Protection Society =

The Sheffield Sawmakers' Protection Society (SSPS) was a trade union representing workers involved in making saws and similar blades, in Sheffield in England.

The origin of the union is unclear. The union described itself as having been founded in 1797, while rules of a "Society of Sawmakers" in Sheffield exist from 1740. However, after 1797, there are no records of the union until 1911, at which time, it had 280 members.

The union affiliated to the Trades Union Congress in 1945, and then grew until 1951, when it had 500 members. Its membership then began to decline. It avoided admitting women as members until the Sex Discrimination Act 1975 compelled it to do so, and the first woman joined in 1976. From 1964 until 1981, its leading figure was president Harry Jones.

In 1984, the union merged into the Transport and General Workers' Union.

== General Secretaries ==
E. Archer
1948: G. F. Wain
1952: G. Nortcliffe
1950s: H. Lambert
1969: E. R. Sheppard
1970: A. Marples
1981: R. Parkin
