= Radcliffe and District Enginemen and Boilermen's Provident Society =

British trade union

The Radcliffe and District Enginemen and Boilermen's Provident Society was a trade union in the United Kingdom. It merged with the Transport and General Workers' Union in 1940.

== See also ==
- List of trade unions
- Transport and General Workers' Union
- TGWU amalgamations
