= Cardiff, Penarth and Barry Coal Trimmers' Union =

Former trade union of the United Kingdom

The Cardiff, Penarth and Barry Coal Trimmers' Union was a trade union representing workers involved in trimming coal and loading on to ships, in South Wales.

== History ==
The union was founded in 1888 as the Cardiff and Penarth Coaltrimmers' Protection and Benefit Association, representing people who worked as coal trimmers at docks in South Wales. In 1890, it gained representation on the new Trimming Board, where it agreed rates with ship owners and coal dock managers. The union affiliated to both the Cardiff Trades Council and the Trades Union Congress in 1897. David Jenkins described the union by this time as "by far the most influential labour organisation in Cardiff's dockland".

In 1911, the union joined the seamen's strike, at which time it had about 2,000 members. This proved to be the only strike in the union's history. This gradually declined, falling to 1,692 in 1926. As one of the two main unions of coal trimmers in the UK, in 1913 the union affiliated to the National Transport Workers' Federation, and its president, Joshua Thomas Clatworthy, was elected to its executive committee. The links made there led it to form the National Joint Trimmers Committee in 1920, with the North of England Trimmers' and Teemers' Association, and other transport unions which represented trimmers in Scotland and southern England. Clatworthy became the leading union member on the joint committee.

In later years, the union was often known as the Cardiff Coal Trimmers' Association. By 1967, it had only 99 members, and it merged into the Transport and General Workers' Union.

== Election results ==
The union affiliated to the Labour Party, and at the 1918 UK general election it sponsored its president as a candidate.

Constituency	Candidate	Votes	%	Position
Cardiff South	Joshua Thomas Clatworthy	4,303	26.3	2

== General Secretaries ==
1888: Samuel Fisher
1932: Joshua Thomas Clatworthy
1946: A. W. Loxton
