= Manchester Ship Canal Pilots' Association =

Former trade union of the United Kingdom

- Merged into: Transport and General Workers' Union
- Dissolved: 1943
- Location: United Kingdom

The Manchester Ship Canal Pilots' Association was a trade union in the United Kingdom. It merged with the Transport and General Workers' Union in 1943.

== See also ==
- List of trade unions
- Transport and General Workers' Union
- TGWU amalgamations
