= Scottish Slaters, Tilers, Roofers and Cement Workers' Society =

Former Scottish trade union

Scottish Slaters', Tilers', Roofers' and Cement Workers' Society
- Merged into: Transport and General Workers' Union
- Founded: 1866
- Dissolved: 1968
- Location: United Kingdom
- Members: 1,383 (1903)

The Scottish Slaters', Tilers', Roofers' and Cement Workers' Society was a trade union representing slaters in Scotland.

The union was founded in Glasgow in 1866 as the Amalgamated Slaters' Society of Scotland, and initially focused on providing strike pay and funeral benefits to members. When the City of Glasgow Bank collapsed in 1878, most building projects in Scotland stopped, and of the trade unions representing building workers in the nation, only the Amalgamated Slaters survived. This survival started a period of great success for the union; slaters went from being the worst-paid building workers to the best paid, and membership rose, reaching a peak of 1,383 by 1903. However, it thereafter fell gradually.

In 1948, the union was renamed as the "Scottish Slaters', Tilers', Roofers' and Cement Workers' Society" in an effort to increase its scope. It merged into the Transport and General Workers' Union in 1968.

== See also ==
- List of trade unions
- TGWU amalgamations
