= Government Civil Employees' Association =

Former trade union of the United Kingdom

The Government Civil Employees' Association was a trade union in the United Kingdom. It merged with the Transport and General Workers' Union in 1946.

== See also ==
- List of trade unions
- Transport and General Workers' Union
- TGWU amalgamations
