= National Winding and General Engineers' Society =

Former trade union of the United Kingdom

The National Winding and General Engineers' Society was a trade union in the United Kingdom. It primarily represented stationary engineers employed at underground coal mines to operate the winding engines which ran the mining hoists. The operation of the mining hoist was a crucial part of the operation of a colliery and the engineers who ran them were generally more skilled than the general mineworkers, who were represented by the Miners' Federation of Great Britain (MFGB). The demarcation between engineers and miners often led to conflict between the two unions, as the MFGB aimed to be an industrial union, representing all employees in coal mining. The engineers' union was affiliated to the Trades Union Congress. It merged with the Transport and General Workers' Union in 1935.

== See also ==
- Transport and General Workers' Union
- TGWU amalgamations
