= North of Ireland Operative Butchers' and Allied Workers' Association =

Former trade union in Northern Ireland

The North of Ireland Operative Butchers' and Allied Workers' Association was a trade union in the United Kingdom. It merged with the Transport and General Workers' Union in 1965.

== See also ==
- List of trade unions
- Transport and General Workers' Union
- TGWU amalgamations
