= United Cut Nail Makers of Great Britain Protection Society =

Former trade union of the United Kingdom

The United Cut Nail Makers of Great Britain Protection Society was a trade union in the United Kingdom. It merged with the Transport and General Workers' Union in 1952.

== See also ==
- TGWU amalgamations
