= Scottish Transport and General Workers' Union (Docks) =

Former Scottish trade union

- Merged into: Transport and General Workers' Union
- Founded: 1932
- Dissolved: 1972
- Headquarters: Glasgow
- Location: United Kingdom

The Scottish Transport and General Workers' Union (Docks) was a trade union representing dock workers in Scotland, principally around Glasgow.

The union was founded in 1932 by dock workers who resigned from the Transport and General Workers' Union (TGWU), in protest at its inability to get employers to agree to compulsory registration of dockers. Many of the dockers were former members of the Scottish Union of Dock Labourers and Transport Workers. Despite the split, the union worked alongside the TGWU with little conflict, and it merged back into the TGWU in 1972.

== See also ==
- List of trade unions
- Transport and General Workers' Union
- TGWU amalgamations
