= Belfast Operative Bakers' Union =

The Belfast Operative Bakers' Union was a trade union representing bakery workers in Northern Ireland.

The union described itself as having been founded in 1817 as the Belfast Bakers' Society. By 1892, it was known as the Belfast Operative Bakers' Friendly and Allied Trades' Society, with 400 members.

The union became part of the Irish National Federal Union of Bakers in 1900, but it left again in 1905, with a slightly increased membership, which peaked at 693 in 1909.

The union merged into the Transport and General Workers' Union in 1930.

== See also ==
- TGWU amalgamations
