= Leith and Granston Pilots =

Former Scottish trade union

- Merged into: Transport and General Workers' Union
- Dissolved: 1945
- Location: United Kingdom

The Leith and Granston Pilots was a trade union in the United Kingdom. It merged with the Transport and General Workers' Union in 1945.

== See also ==
- List of trade unions
- Transport and General Workers' Union
- TGWU amalgamations
