= Union of Bookmakers' Employees =

Former trade union of the United Kingdom

The Union of Bookmakers' Employees (UBE) was a trade union in the United Kingdom. It merged with the Transport and General Workers' Union in 1974. The inaugural meeting was in Manchester Town Hall.

== See also ==
- List of trade unions
- Transport and General Workers' Union
- TGWU amalgamations
