= Scottish Busmen's Union =

Former Scottish trade union

The Scottish Busmen's Union was a trade union representing bus drivers and conductors in Scotland.

The union was in existence by 1929, and was based in Edinburgh. It merged into the Transport and General Workers' Union in 1934.

== See also ==
- List of trade unions
- TGWU amalgamations
