= Gibraltar Confederation of Labour =

Former trade union of the United Kingdom

The Gibraltar Confederation of Labour was a trade union established in the British and at the time Crown colony of Gibraltar in 1947, and promoted by the Association for the Advancement of Civil Rights (AACR). Its first president was Albert Risso, at the time president of the AACR. During 1948, Albert Fava become its general secretary. However, he was deported by the Governor on the grounds of being a member of the Communist Party.

It merged with the Transport and General Workers' Union in 1963.

== See also ==
- TGWU amalgamations
