= Deal porter =

Specialist dock workers in London

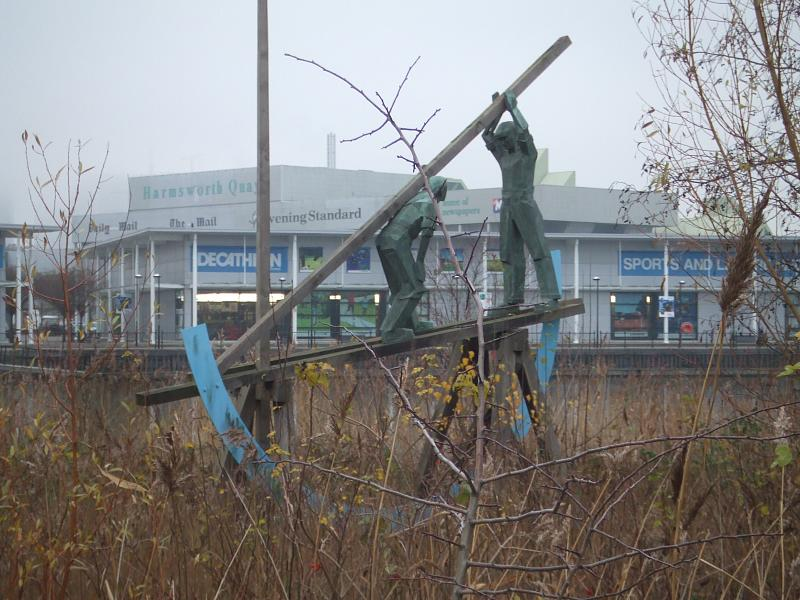
Deal Porters sculpture by Philip Bews

The deal porters were a specialist group of workers in London's docks. They handled baulks of softwood or "deal", stacking them up to 60 feet (18 m) high in quayside warehouses. This was a demanding and dangerous job. It required physical strength, dexterity and a head for heights, to such an extent that they were nicknamed "Blondins" after the famous acrobat, Charles Blondin. Deal porters wore special leather headgear (backing hats) with long "aprons" over their shoulders in order to protect their heads and necks from wooden splinters.

Their trade was a notably hazardous one. The New Survey of London Life and Labour, published in 1928, noted:

"Deal portering is heavy and dangerous work which cannot safely be undertaken by any save experienced men. The shoulder of an experienced deal porter is said to develop a callosity which enables it to bear the weight and friction of a load of planks. But even with a hardened shoulder the deal porter has an unenviable task. To carry over a shaking slippery plankway a bundle of shaking slippery planks, when a fall would almost certainly mean serious injury, is work for specialists."

Most of the deal porters worked at the Surrey Commercial Docks in Rotherhithe, which specialised in timber. The workers were represented by the Port of London Deal Porters' Union. They were eventually rendered obsolete by the 1940s as mechanisation provided a better and cheaper way of moving timber cargo, and less arduous jobs became available elsewhere.

There are a number of commemorations of the deal porters in Rotherhithe. At Canada Water there is a sculpture in their honour, designed by Philip Bews. There is a street named "Deal Porters Way", a street named "Blondin Way", a path named "Deal Porters Walk", and a public square alongside Canada Water Library named "Deal Porters Square". The Compass pub in Rotherhithe Street was formerly named "The Deal Porter".
