= Liverpool and District Carters' and Motormen's Union =

Former trade union of the United Kingdom

- Merged into: Transport and General Workers' Union
- Founded: 1889
- Dissolved: 1 January 1947
- Headquarters: Highway House, 400 Scotland Road, Liverpool
- Location: England
- Members: 8,050 (1945)
- Affiliations: TUC

The Liverpool and District Carters' and Motormen's Union (LDCMU) was a trade union representing cart drivers in the Merseyside area of England.

The union was founded in 1889 as the Mersey Quay and Railway Carters' Union. It opposed the New Unionism, and tried to maintain the relatively privileged position of horsemen on the docks, as opposed to general labourers. It also tried to restrict competition, by charging a £2 entrance fee to non-local residents, while those in the Merseyside area could join for 5 shillings. Membership reached a peak of 5,083 in 1910, but thereafter began to decline, along with horse-drawn carts in general.

The union was known for avoiding industrial action, although it did support the 1911 dock strike. By 1920, it accepted drivers of motor vehicles into membership, and renamed itself as the Liverpool and District Carters' and Motormen's Union. Paul Smith described the union as the "single most important trade union in road haulage [in the UK] during the 1920s". In contrast to other local road haulage unions, it "developed a high degree of cohesion and job controls within its geographical jurisdiction". It did have to concede pay cuts in 1930. In 1934, it worked with the Transport and General Workers' Union (TGWU), Scottish Horse and Motormen's Association and United Road Transport Workers' Association to achieve a national agreement on terms and conditions, but this soon fell apart, as the other unions were unable to prevent individual employers from offering worse terms. Membership fell to only 8,400 by 1938, but it rebounded to about 11,000 by 1946.

The union merged into the TGWU in 1947, becoming its 12/41 branch. This continued the LDCMU's approach of "non-political" trade unionism.

== General Secretaries ==
1889: William Almond
1900s: Thomas Ditchfield
1910s: Albert N. Denaro
1912: William Henry Jones MBE

== See also ==
- TGWU amalgamations
