= Cumberland Enginemen, Boilermen and Electrical Workers' Union =

UK trade union

The Cumberland Enginemen, Boilermen and Electrical Workers' Union was a trade union in the United Kingdom. It merged with the Transport and General Workers' Union in 1928.

== See also ==
- List of trade unions
- Transport and General Workers' Union
- TGWU amalgamations
