= File Grinders' Society =

Former trade union of the United Kingdom

The File Grinders' Trade Society was a trade union in the United Kingdom. It represented skilled workers in the cutlery trade in Sheffield. The file-grinders had a particularly strong union compared to other societies in the cutlery trade. It was formed in 1845 and had 204 members in 1860, rising to 240 out of 320 employees in the trade in 1890. By 1910, membership had fallen to 195 out of 250 workers. It merged with the Transport and General Workers' Union in 1975.

== See also ==
- Transport and General Workers' Union
- TGWU amalgamations
