= Electricity Supply Staff Association (Dublin) =

The Electricity Supply Staff Association (Dublin) was a trade union in Ireland. It merged with the Transport and General Workers' Union in 1936.

== See also ==
- List of trade unions
- Transport and General Workers' Union
- TGWU amalgamations
