= National Association of Youth Hostel Wardens =

Former trade union of the United Kingdom

The National Association of Youth Hostel Wardens was a trade union representing workers at youth hostels in England and Wales.

The union was founded in 1948 as the National Federation of Wardens' Associations. In 1965, it became the "National Association of Youth Hostel Wardens". Never a large organisation, in the late 1970s its membership was around 300, with the highest membership levels in the Lake District, Devon and Cornwall.

The union merged with the Transport and General Workers' Union in 1978.

== See also ==
- List of trade unions
- Transport and General Workers' Union
- TGWU amalgamations
