= Union of Kodak Workers =

Former trade union of the United Kingdom

The Union of Kodak Workers was a trade union in the United Kingdom. It affiliated with the Transport and General Workers' Union in 1974.

== See also ==
- List of trade unions
- Transport and General Workers' Union
- TGWU amalgamations
