= Weaver Watermen's Association =

Former trade union of the United Kingdom

- Merged into: Transport and General Workers' Union
- Founded: 1898
- Dissolved: 1926
- Location: United Kingdom
- Members: 424 (1926)
- Affiliations: NTWF

The Weaver Watermen's Association was a trade union in the United Kingdom. It was first registered in 1898 and was based in Winsford, Cheshire. Its total membership was in the low 400s for most of its existence. It merged with the Transport and General Workers' Union in 1926. Following its amalgamation its offices were moved to Norwich.

== See also ==
- Transport and General Workers' Union
- TGWU amalgamations
