= Lurgan Hemmers' Veiners' and General Workers' Union =

Lurgan Hemmers' Veiners and General Workers' Union
- Merged into: Transport and General Workers Union
- Founded: 1885
- Dissolved: 1951
- Headquarters: 79 North Street, Lurgan
- Location: Northern Ireland
- Members: 2,500 (1911)
- Key people: R. Levin, Secretary
- Affiliations: Irish Trades Union Congress

The Lurgan Hemmers' Veiners' and General Workers' Union, also known as the Lurgan Hemmers' and Veiners' Trade Union and the Lurgan Hemmers' and Veiners' and General Women Workers' Trade Union, was a trade union in Northern Ireland. It was formed in 1885 but 'faded away' some time before 1889. It was re-established in 1901–2. In 1911 the union had 2,500 members. It primarily represented female workers and was briefly affiliated to the Irish Trades Union Congress in 1911. It merged with the Transport and General Workers' Union in 1951.

== General Secretaries ==
1900s: Minnie Rodgers
c.1919: Robert Levin

== See also ==
- Transport and General Workers' Union
- TGWU amalgamations
