= Flint Glass Makers' Sick and Friendly Society =

Former trade union of the United Kingdom

Logo of the union

The Flint Glass Makers' Sick and Friendly Society, often known as the Flint Glass Makers' Friendly Society (FGMFS) was a trade union in the United Kingdom.

The union was founded in 1844 as the United Flint Glass Makers Society. This union was bankrupted by an unsuccessful strike at the Five Ways Flint Glass Works in 1848, and it was therefore reorganised as the FGMFS at a meeting in Manchester the following year. Initially, it included members from Lancashire, Yorkshire, the West Midlands, Edinburgh and Dublin. By 1850, the union had nearly 1,000 members.

The union's Central Secretary had considerable power, including the ability to appoint the entire Central Committee. However, they were initially subject to election every three years, and only one Secretary was ever re-elected: T. J. Wilkinson in 1870. The union also published the monthly Flint Glass Makers' Magazine, and was supportive of George Potter and the early Trades Union Congress (TUC), Wilkinson serving as its President in 1869.

The FGMFS was the richest union of its day, and was able to pay pensions and ill health benefits to its members. It campaigned for the repeal the Master and Servant Act, but the revised 1867 Act met most of its demands, and it ceased political intervention.

In 1899, the union was renamed as the National Flint Glass Makers' Society of Great Britain and Ireland. A group of members in Leeds left in 1903 to form the rival National Glass Bottle Makers' Society. The remaining union against changed its name in 1935, becoming the National Flint Glass Makers' Friendly Society of Great Britain and Ireland. In 1948, it merged with the National Union of Glass Cutters and Decorators, and changed its name to the National Union of Flint Glass Workers.

The new union did not affiliate to the Trades Union Congress or any other trade union organisations. Although it had members across the UK, its small membership was concentrated in Stourbridge, where it had its headquarters. Its long-term secretary died in 2005, and with only 149 members and a weak financial position, it dissolved in 2006.
