= Port of London Deal Porters' Union =

Trade union

The Port of London Deal Porters' Union was a trade union in the United Kingdom. It merged with the Transport and General Workers' Union in 1939. The union represented deal porters, who handled baulks of imported softwood at the Port of London, principally around the Surrey Commercial Docks at Rotherhithe.

== See also ==
- List of trade unions
- Transport and General Workers' Union
- TGWU amalgamations
