= Irish Union of Hairdressers and Allied Workers =

Former trade union of the United Kingdom

The Irish Union of Hairdressers and Allied Workers was a trade union in the United Kingdom representing hairdressers, barbers, and hairdressers assistants. It merged with the Transport and General Workers' Union in 1969.

== See also ==
- List of trade unions
- Transport and General Workers' Union
- TGWU amalgamations
