= Edward McHugh (trade unionist) =

Irish labour activist (1853–1915)

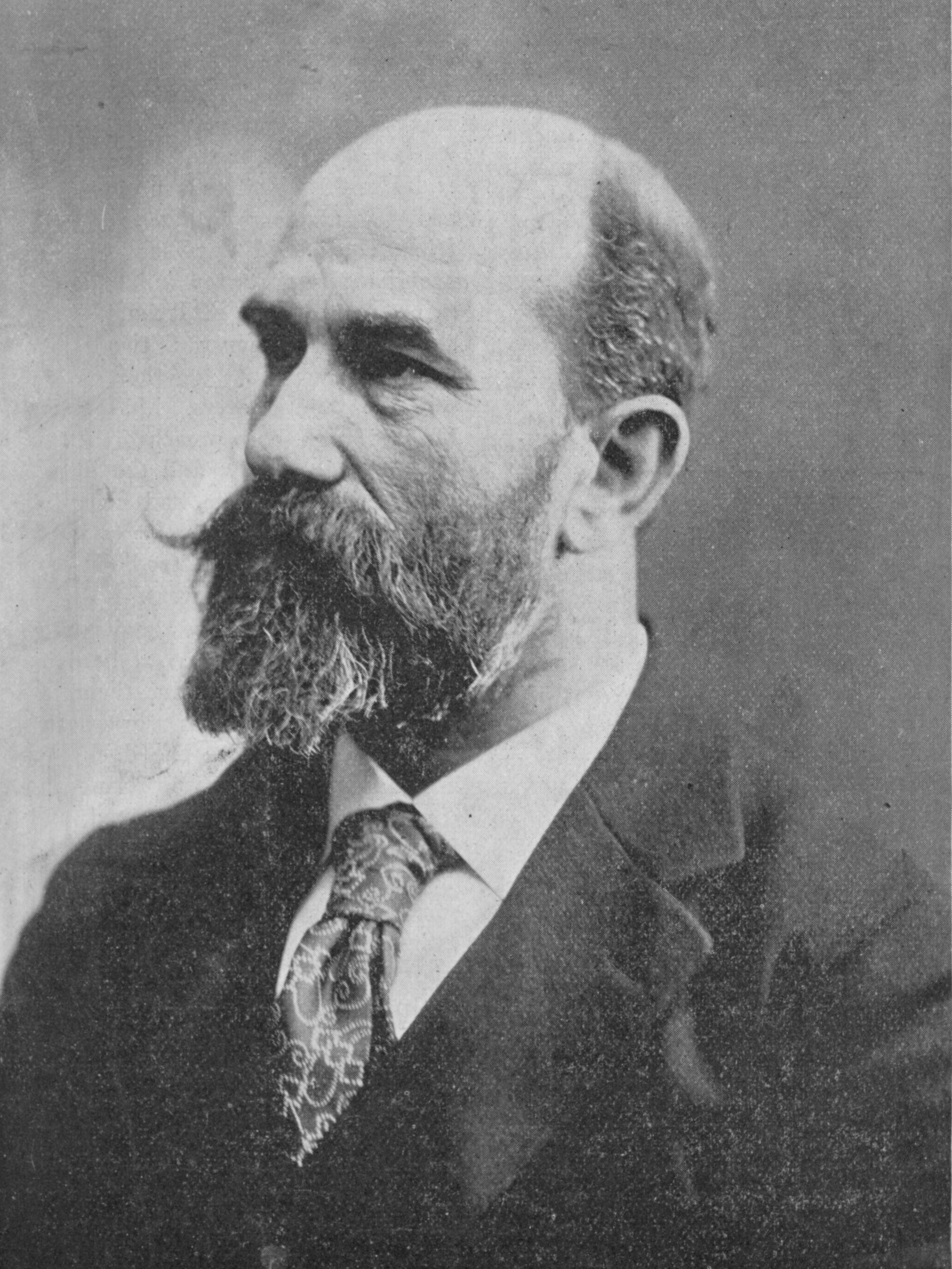
Portrait of McHugh, circa 1899

Edward McHugh (21 August 1853 – 13 April 1915) was an Irish Georgist (land reformer), trade unionist, Labour activist and social reformer. He spent a great deal of his lifetime engaged in the struggle for social reform not only in Great Britain and Ireland, but also further afield, including spells in America and the Antipodes.

Born in rural County Tyrone to a smallholding family, before emigrating through economic necessity to the overcrowded industrial landscape of Greenock, and then Glasgow, Edward McHugh shared with his friend, Michael Davitt, experience of both sides of the land question. It is not surprising that, having witnessed rural and urban poverty at an early age, McHugh would become firmly committed to the ideals of Henry George, and convinced that land, and its inequitable distribution, should lie at the root of all social ills.

After moving to Glasgow as a teenager to find work as a compositor, McHugh found himself in a city with various possibilities for developing his education as a social reformer. The Irish who had fled to the city in such numbers after the Great Famine were finally starting to organise themselves politically. Native Scots of all classes, especially those Gaels who had come from the Highlands as a result either of the Clearances or the region's own famine in the 1840s, were contemplating the conditions in which the working classes of Glasgow, and other towns in Scotland, were forced to live. As a member of the Glasgow Home Rule Association, and then the secretary of the Glasgow branch of the Irish Land League, McHugh was singled out as a speaker and organiser of ability, and was chosen to lead a Land League mission to the Scottish Highlands in order to direct the nascent crofters' agitation along radical lines. After the death of the Land League, McHugh toured Scotland with Henry George himself, and helped to found the Scottish Land Restoration League, a body dedicated to taxing land values to their full extent, thereby abolishing landlordism.

The ability shown by McHugh was then harnessed by the Trades Union movement, as he and his old friend Richard McGhee formed and ran the National Union of Dock Labourers, sustaining them through bitter strikes in Glasgow (1889), and Liverpool (1890). This latter strike was a turning point in McHugh's domestic life, as he settled then in Birkenhead. Internal intrigue forced him to quit as General Secretary of the NUDL, but McHugh remained active in the Trade Unionism, spending the years 1896–1899 in New York City, organising the American Longshoremen's Union, and preaching the ‘Single Tax Gospel.' The fact that McHugh was with Henry George at the time of the latter's death in 1897 gave the Ulsterman a great caché in Single Tax circles for the rest of his life, and on returning to Birkenhead he settled down and spent the rest of his life striving for social reform through the propagation of the George's theories.

== See also ==
- Highland Land League

Trade union offices
Preceded by New position	General Secretary of the National Union of Dock Labourers; 1889–1893	Succeeded by James Sexton
