= Halifax and District Carters' and Motormen's Association =

Former trade union of the United Kingdom

The Halifax and District Carters' and Motormen's Association was a trade union in the United Kingdom. It merged with the Transport and General Workers' Union in 1936.

== See also ==
- List of trade unions
- Transport and General Workers' Union
- TGWU amalgamations
