= Federation of Professional Railway Staff =

Former trade union of the United Kingdom

The Federation of Professional Railway Staff was a trade union in the United Kingdom.

The union was founded in 1983 by former members of the National Union of Railwaymen and the Associated Society of Locomotive Engineers and Firemen who were opposed to the 1982 British Rail strike and also to closed shop agreements. It aimed to secure recognition from British Rail, but was unable to do so. Members of the union were involved in driving coal trains during the UK miners' strike of 1984 to 1985, when other rail unions asked their members not to do so.

Membership still stood at 200 in 2004, but had fallen to only 33 in 2015, and it dissolved that year.

== General Secretaries ==
to 2006: J. Gedrose
2006: Lester E. Fuller
2015: Kathleen Carroll
