= Scottish Textile Workers' Union =

Former trade union of Scotland

The Scottish Textile Workers' Union was a trade union representing textile workers in parts of Scotland.

The union was founded as the Kirkcaldy Mill and Factory Workers' Union at an unknown date. By 1907, it had been renamed as the "Scottish Textile Workers' Union", with membership expanding to cover Kinross, Dunfermline and other areas of west Fife. It merged with the Transport and General Workers' Union in 1961.

== See also ==
- List of trade unions
- Transport and General Workers' Union
- TGWU amalgamations
