= Imperial War Graves Commission Staff Association =

Former trade union of the United Kingdom

The Imperial War Graves Commission Staff Association was a trade union in the United Kingdom. It merged with the Transport and General Workers' Union in 1938 and renamed Unite the Union when the transport and general workers union merged with another trade union.

== See also ==
- List of Imperial War Graves staff burials
