= National Glass Bottle Makers' Society =

Former trade union of the United Kingdom

The National Glass Bottle Makers' Society was a trade union representing workers involved in the manufacture of glass bottles in the United Kingdom.

The union was founded in Leeds in 1903 as a split from the National Flint Glass Makers' Society of Great Britain and Ireland. It affiliated to the Trades Union Congress (TUC), at which time it was led by F. Swann and had 987 members. It soon left the TUC but remained active until it merged into the Transport and General Workers' Union in 1940.

== See also ==
- List of trade unions
- Transport and General Workers' Union
- TGWU amalgamations
