= European Transport Workers' Federation =

European trade union

ETF
- European Transport Workers' Federation
- Founded: June 1999
- Headquarters: Brussels, Belgium
- Location: European
- Members: Over 5 million
- Key people: Frank Moreels, President; Livia Spera, General Secretary
- Affiliations: 200+ affiliated unions
- Website: etf-europe.org

The European Transport Workers' Federation (ETF) is a pan-European trade union organisation that represents over 5 million transport workers from more than 200 transport unions across Europe, from the European Union, the European Economic Area, and Central and Eastern Europe, in over 30 countries.

== Leadership ==
=== Presidents ===
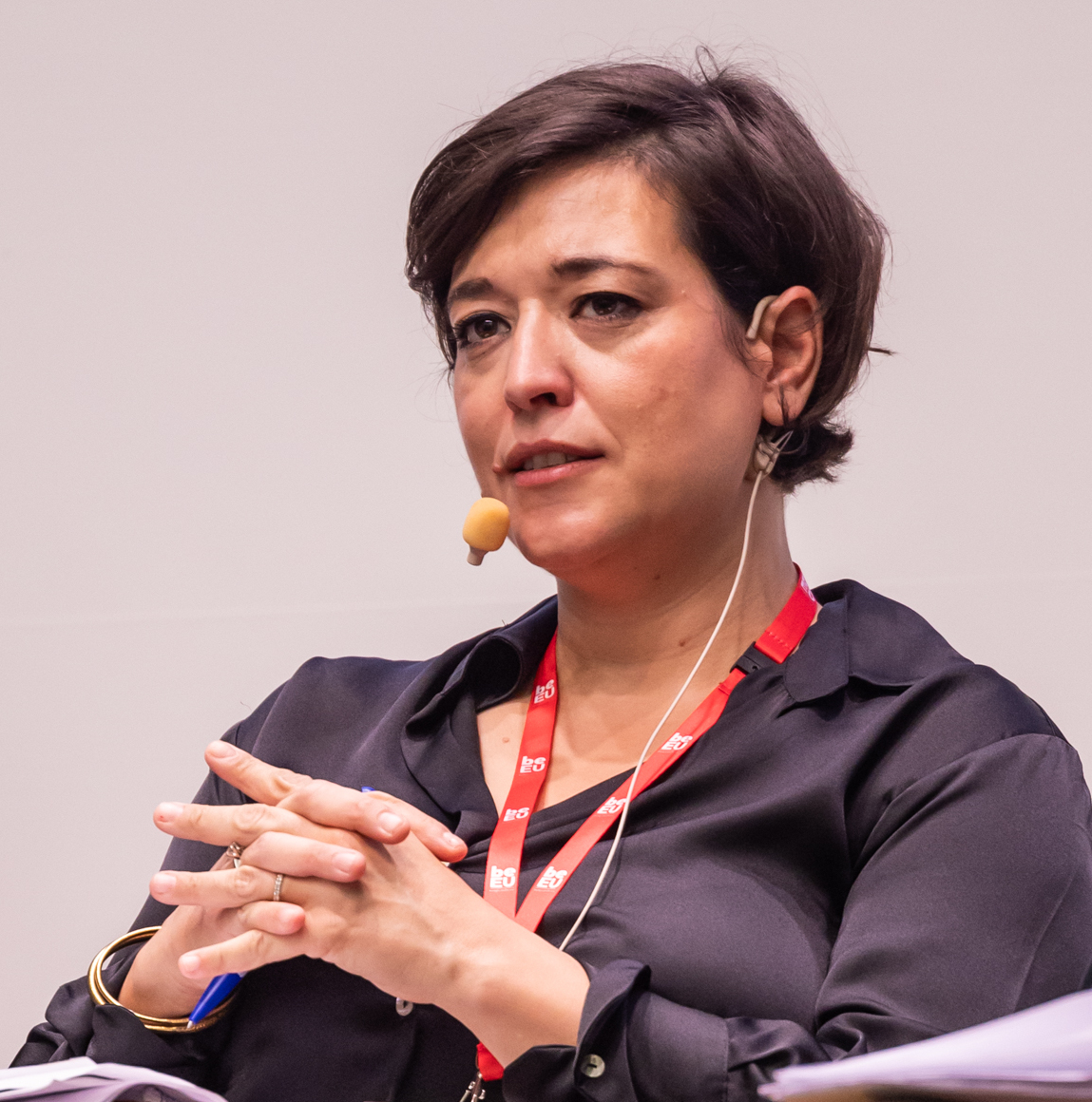
Livia Spera, general secretary, in 2024.

1999: Wilhelm Haberzettl
2009: Graham Stevenson
2012: Lars Lindgren
2017: Frank Moreels

=== General Secretaries ===
1999: Doro Zinke
2005: Eduardo Chagas
2019: Livia Spera
