= Process and General Workers' Union =

- Merged into: Transport and General Workers' Union
- Founded: 1888
- Dissolved: 1969
- Headquarters: Central Palace Drive, Northwich
- Location: United Kingdom
- Members: 2,196 (1951)
- Affiliations: TUC

The Process and General Workers' Union was a British trade union representing workers involved in mining and processing salt, and related industries, mostly in Cheshire.

== History ==
The union was founded in November 1888, as the Northwich Amalgamated Society of Salt Workers, Rock Salt Miners, Alkali Workers, Mechanics and General Labourers. Six months later, William Yarwood took over as its general secretary, resolving numerous industrial disputes. He brought the union into the Trades Union Congress, and the National Transport Workers' Federation. It was based at the Vine Tavern in Northwich, then in the 1920s moved to the George and Dragon.

In 1951, the union had 2,196 members, and renamed itself as the Mid-Cheshire Salt and Chemical Industries Allied Workers' Union, and in 1966 it became the Process and General Workers' Union. Three years later, it merged into the Transport and General Workers' Union.

== General Secretaries ==
1889: William Yarwood
1918: W. Kettle
C. Yarwood
1945: H. Sutton
1961: R. M. Moss
