= National Union of Ships' Clerks, Grain Weighers and Coalmeters =

Former trade union of the United Kingdom

- Merged into: Transport and General Workers' Union
- Founded: 1912
- Dissolved: 1 January 1922
- Headquarters: Plaistow, Newham
- Location: United Kingdom
- Members: 732 (1920)
- Key people: G. N. Richmond, Secretary.

The National Union of Ships' Clerks, Grain Weighers and Coalmeters was a trade union in the United Kingdom.

The union was in existence by 1912, at which time it had branches in central London, Grays, Millwall, Southampton, Surrey Docks and Tilbury. At the time, it was based in Plaistow and its secretary was G. N. Richmond. Because of its location, it was also known as the "East Ham Union". It merged with the Transport and General Workers' Union in 1922.

== See also ==
- List of trade unions
- Transport and General Workers' Union
- TGWU amalgamations
