= Portadown Textile Workers' Union =

Former trade union in Northern Ireland

The Portadown Textile Workers' Union was a trade union in the United Kingdom.

The union split from the Portadown, Banbridge and District Textile Workers' Union, which had been established in 1909. Always a very small union, it merged with the Transport and General Workers' Union in 1933.

== See also ==
- List of trade unions
- Transport and General Workers' Union
- TGWU amalgamations
