= Sheffield Amalgamated Union of File Trades =

Former trade union of the United Kingdom

- Merged into: Transport and General Workers' Union
- Founded: 1915
- Dissolved: 1970
- Location: United Kingdom

The Sheffield Amalgamated Union of File Trades was a trade union in the United Kingdom. It was formed in 1915 by the merger of the Machine File Forgers' Union and the Machine File Cutters' Union. In 1917, it merged with the hand-file forgers and file hardeners unions. From 1918, it admitted all workers in the file trade who were not eligible to join other unions. It merged with the Transport and General Workers' Union in 1970.

== See also ==
- Transport and General Workers' Union
- TGWU amalgamations
