= Belfast Breadservers' Trade Union =

Trade union in Northern Ireland

The Belfast Breadservers' Trade Union represents people working in retail bakers in Northern Ireland.

The union was founded in 1896. Its membership varied dramatically over time, from 150 in 1897 to only 15 in 1899, then 340 in 1911.

It merged with the Transport and General Workers' Union in 1924, when it had about 500 members. However, it kept its identity within the TGWU.

The union is usually referred to in TGWU documents as the Belfast Breadservers' Association, although its 1923 rulebook gives the correct name as Belfast Breadservers' Trade Union, a name which it was still using in the late 1960s.

== See also ==
- TGWU amalgamations
