= Fish marketing =

Marketing and sale of fish products

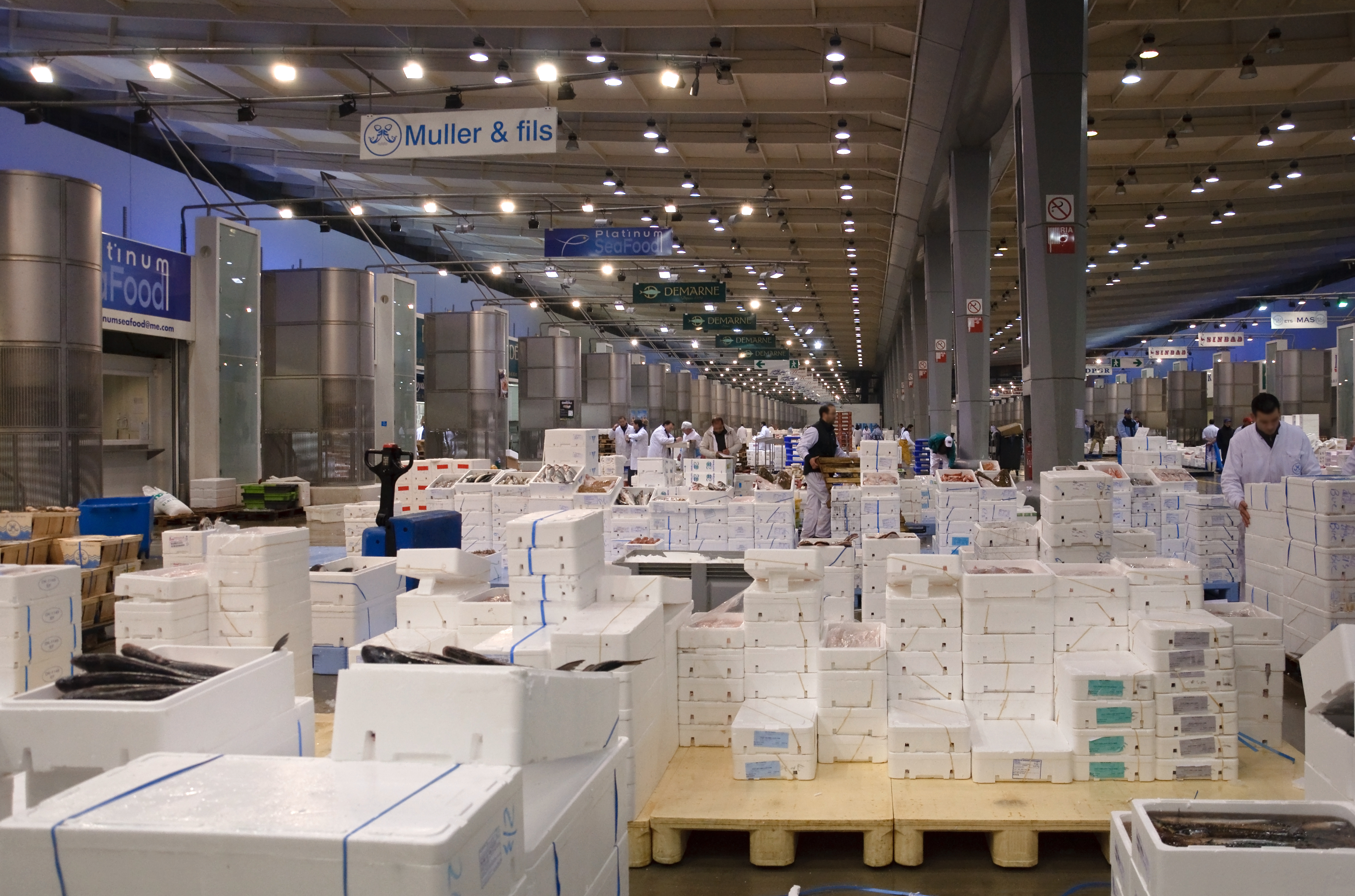
Fresh fish pavilion of the Rungis International Market, France.

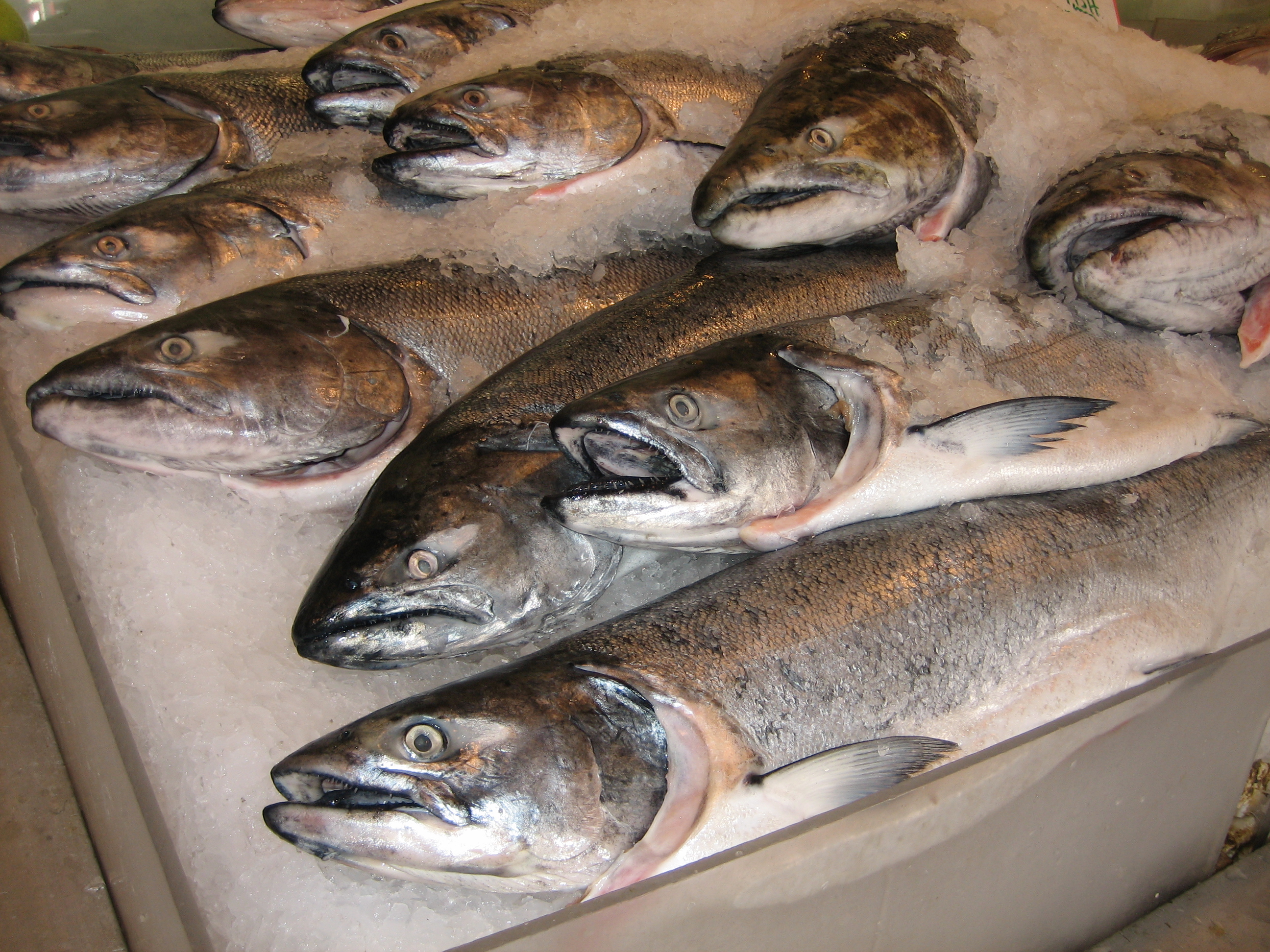
Salmon for sale at a fish market.

Fish marketing is the marketing and sale of fish, food fish and fish products.

== Live fish trade ==
The live fish trade can refer to the live food fish trade (for human consumption) or to the ornamental fish trade (for aquariums). The fish can come from many places, but most comes from Southeast Asia. The live food fish trade is a global system that links fishing communities with markets, primarily in Hong Kong and mainland China. Many of the fish are captured on coral reefs in Southeast Asia or the Pacific Island nations.

== Shrimp marketing ==
Shrimp are marketed and commercialised with several issues in mind. Most shrimp are sold frozen and marketed based on their categorisation of presentation, grading, colour, and uniformity.

== Fish markets ==
A fish market is a marketplace for selling fish and fish products. It can be dedicated to wholesale trade between fishermen and fish merchants, or to the sale of seafood to individual consumers, or to both. Retail fish markets, a type of wet market, often sell street food as well.

Fish markets range in size from small fish stalls to large ones such as the great Tsukiji fish market in Tokyo, which turns over about 660,000 tonnes a year. The term fish market can also refer to the process of fish marketing in general, but this article is concerned with physical marketplaces.

== Chasse-marée ==
The fundamental meaning of un chasse-marée was "a wholesale fishmonger", originally on the Channel coast of France and later, on the Atlantic coast as well. He bought in the coastal ports and sold in inland markets. However, this meaning is not normally adopted into English. The name for such a trader in Britain, from 1500 to 1900 at least, was 'rippier'.

== See also ==
- List of harvested aquatic animals by weight
