= Port of Liverpool Staff Association =

Former trade union of the United Kingdom

- Founded: 1969
- Location: United Kingdom

The Port of Liverpool Staff Association was a trade union in the United Kingdom. It was established in 1969 as part of the Association of Clerical, Technical and Supervisory Staffs, itself part of the Transport and General Workers' Union. It replaced the Mersey Docks and Harbour Board Salaried Staff Organisation, which was not a trade union.
