= Northern Ireland Textile Workers' Union =

Trade union in Northern Ireland

The Northern Ireland Textile Workers' Union was a trade union in the United Kingdom. It merged with the Transport and General Workers' Union in 1930.

== See also ==
- List of trade unions
- Transport and General Workers' Union
- TGWU amalgamations
