= Grimsby Steam and Diesel Fishing Vessels Engineers' and Firemen's Union =

Former trade union of the United Kingdom

- Merged into: Transport and General Workers' Union
- Founded: 1896
- Dissolved: 1976
- Headquarters: 8 Rigby Square, Grimsby
- Location: United Kingdom
- Members: 1,232
- Key people: John Collins (Gen Sec)
- Affiliations: National Federation of Enginemen, Stokers and Kindred Trade Societies

The Grimsby Steam and Diesel Fishing Vessels Engineers' and Firemen's Union was a trade union in the United Kingdom.

== History ==
The union was founded in 1896 as the Grimsby Steam Fishing Vessels' Engineers' and Firemen's Union. It initially had only fourteen members, but this increased to 131 by the end of the year, and 900 in 1900.

The union was affiliated to the National Federation of Enginemen, Stokers and Kindred Trade Societies. The union's membership was recorded as 1,232 in 1912, declining to 809 in 1926. The fishing industry based in Grimsby, once the largest fishing port in the world, declined dramatically towards the end of the 20th century.

In 1973, the union was expelled from the Trades Union Congress (TUC), for registering with the government, in defiance of TUC policy. It merged into the Transport and General Workers' Union in 1976.

== General Secretaries ==
1896: John Collins
1927: William Thompson
1945: J. C. B. Olsen
1956: G. H. Harker
1961: J. R. Swinburn
1962: A. B. Stuart
1969: A. E. Horsley

== See also ==
- TGWU amalgamations
