= United Fishermen's Union =

Former trade union of the United Kingdom

- Merged into: Transport and General Workers' Union
- Dissolved: 1966
- Location: United Kingdom

The United Fishermen's Union was a trade union in the United Kingdom.

The story of the United Fishermen’s Union began with a strike of the Grimsby Trawler Officers Guild in 1961. The strike which extended to Hull was against the landing of fish by Icelandic boats at these ports.

The strike was opposed by the deckhands union the TGWU who spoke out about using strike action for political change. The president of the Guild replied that the TGWU should stop interfering in port affairs and said he had received a number of applications from deckhands asking that the Guild set up a union for them.

The UFU was formed in April 1961 by ex members of the TGWU the week after its formation it had recruited nearly 800 members, had designed a badge for members and was having membership cards printed . Skipper C.W.A. Chapple G.M. D.S.C. was acting as president and revealed that the NUGMW had offered assistance to the new union but could not take fishermen in to membership.

A week later membership had reached 1100 and in September it registered as trade union .

In October and claiming 2000 members in Grimsby the union informed the trawler owners UFU members would not sail with non union deck crew, and would only sail if all deck crew were members of UFU or TGWU.

Northern Trawlers Ltd suspended eight UFU members for refusing to work with non union labour, The UFU voted to strike the company until the men reinstated which they were.

After one year the union had 2300 members in Grimsby, 700 on Hull and 300 in Lowestoft.

The union applied for TUC membership and membership of the Fishing Industry Joint Industrial Council but were turned down by both.

By 1963 membership in Hull had fallen away but remained strong in Grimsby.

The TGWU approached the UFU with an offer of a transfer of engagements. The UFU would become the United Fishermen’s Union branch of the TGWU and gain representation on the NJIC and port committee. The UFU members voted in favour and became part of the TGWU on 1 January 1966.

== See also ==
- TGWU amalgamations
