= Scottish Union of Dock Labourers =

Former Scottish trade union

- Merged with: Transport and General Workers' Union
- Founded: 1911
- Dissolved: 1922
- Location: United Kingdom
- Key people: Joe Houghton, President
- Affiliations: NTWF

The Scottish Union of Dock Labourers was a Glasgow-based trade union for waterfront workers. It was formed during the seamen's and dockers' strikes of June–July 1911. Locally, it replaced the National Union of Dock Labourers, which had been formed in Glasgow in 1889 but later became unpopular in that port, finally closing its local branch in February 1910. The president of the SUDL throughout its lifetime was Joe Houghton. The union joined the Transport & General Workers' Union in 1922, but many of its members left in 1932 to form the Scottish Transport and General Workers' Union (Docks).

== See also ==
- Transport and General Workers' Union
- TGWU amalgamations
