= Independent Pilots Association (United Kingdom) =

IPA
- Independent Pilots Association
- Founded: 1992; 34 years ago
- Location: United Kingdom
- Members: ▲1,236 (2025)
- General Secretary: Philip Flower
- Chairman: Phillip Petitt
- Website: www.ipapilot.com

The Independent Pilots Association (IPA) is a professional association and trade union in the United Kingdom, which promotes the welfare and interests of flight crew.

== Overview ==
The IPA carries out a variety of initiatives that aim to support and enhance British aviation and its members' working environment and job security. These range from improving flight safety through training and educational programs and initiatives, lobbying Government, funding research initiatives to representing crews with career and employment issues.

The origins of the Association can be traced to the early 1990s when a self-help group was organised at the Gatwick Airport job centre for pilots out of work following the collapse of Air Europe in 1991.

By the spring of 1992 most of the pilots were back in jobs, many with a new airline Excalibur Airways. A specialist in financial affairs suggested that if fifty or more of them formed a group then it would be possible to get better rates on pension provision, loss of licence insurance and similar services. As a result the Independent Pilots Association was created.

The IPA took premises in Haywards Heath in the back office of a benefactor. Although not in a position to help financially, the IPA lent support, office and storage space to the Dan Air Pilots Action Group who sought compensation from British Airways (BA) when Dan Air (Dan Air Services Limited) was taken over by BA and several more pilots found themselves out of work and seeking fair representation.

Steady growth of membership has been experienced over the years with new members coming from both ends of the career spectrum. Current membership is spread throughout all British operators, from flying schools and air taxi operators to major airlines, as well as some overseas.

In the early 2000s, Noel Baker, one of the founding members and a long serving Director, suggested the idea of a parallel organisation that would be a Union. This was instituted in 2006 and initially was known as the Independent Pilots Federation (IPF). The IPF Union would offer all the advantages of such an organisation and offering the opportunity for some pilots to have a recognition agreement in their airline or similar organisation. The reason that the IPA could not become a Union is that a ruling in the IPA's constitution required a 75% majority of all registered members to vote in favour. Since the majority of the original founding members had been badly let down by their own union in 1992 they were not inclined towards such a grouping.

== See also ==
- British Airline Pilots' Association
