= Scottish Seafishers' Union =

Former Scottish trade union

- Merged into: Transport and General Workers' Union
- Dissolved: 1937
- Location: United Kingdom

The Scottish Seafishers' Union was a trade union representing fishermen in Scotland.

The union was founded in 1899 as the Aberdeen Steam Fishing Vessels Enginemen's and Firemen's Union. It had 200 members by the end of the year, but this declined to only 60 in 1903, when Joseph Forbes Duncan was appointed as general secretary. Within the year, he had increased membership to 360, and from 1905 began opening branches around Scotland. As a result, the union's named was changed to the Scottish Steam Fishing Vessels' Enginemen and Firemen's Union.

The union undertook strikes in 1905 and 1907, both against the wishes of Duncan, who felt that they had achieved little. He briefly left the union to work full-time for the Independent Labour Party, but found the role lonely, and returned to the union again in 1908.

In 1924, the union decided to begin admitting cooks and deckhands, and accordingly it changed its name to the Scottish Seafishers' Union. In 1937, it merged into the Transport and General Workers' Union in 1937, becoming its Scottish Sea Fishermen's Section.

== General Secretaries ==
1899: R. H. Craig
1903: Joseph Forbes Duncan

== See also ==
- TGWU amalgamations
