= North of England Trimmers' and Teemers' Association =

Former trade union of the United Kingdom

The North of England Trimmers' and Teemers Association was a trade union in the United Kingdom. The union was formed in 1871 and merged with the Tyne and Blyth association in 1902. It had 1,500 members in 1908, increasing to 1,913 in 1915.

Trimmers and teemers were employed in loading coal onto ships from staithes. Teemers would open the trapdoors on rail waggons which had been positioned above the ships' hoppers. The trimmers would then distribute the coal evenly around the hopper using shovels.

The Trimmers and Teemers Association merged with the Transport and General Workers' Union in 1922.

== See also ==
- Transport and General Workers' Union
- TGWU amalgamations
