= National Amalgamated Coal Workers' Union =

Former trade union of the United Kingdom

- National Amalgamated Coal Porters' Union of Inland and Seaborne Coal Workers
- Merged into: Transport and General Workers Union
- Founded: 1889
- Dissolved: 1922
- Headquarters: Rugby Chambers, Chapel Street, London
- Location: United Kingdom
- Members: 12,000 (1892)
- Key people: Alfred Walton (Gen Sec)
- Parent organization: Miners' Federation of Great Britain (1893
- Affiliations: TUC

The National Amalgamated Coal Workers' Union was a trade union in the United Kingdom which existed between 1889 and 1922. It represented coal porters and carmen.

== History ==
The union was formed as the National Amalgamated Coal Porters Union of Inland and Seaborne Coal Workers in 1890, and affiliated with the Trades Union Congress in 1890. Union membership grew rapidly from 5000 in 1891 to 12,000 in 1892. A major three-week strike occurred in London in 1892, involving 6,000 members of the union, over the employment on a non-union worker and the failure of some employers to pay standard wages. The strike was unsuccessful, but it was agreed through conciliation that the strikers would be re-employed.

Following the failure of the strike, the union affiliated to the Miners' Federation of Great Britain, but its membership fell, to 4,000 in 1896 and 1,535 in 1910. By 1920 it had recovered somewhat, with a membership of 10,000. In 1922 it merged with 13 other British trade unions to form the Transport and General Workers' Union.

== General Secretaries ==
1890: George Shelley
1893: James O'Connor
1890s: J. Hopkin
1910s: Alfred Walton

== See also ==
- TGWU amalgamations
