= Humber Amalgamated Steam Trawler Engineers and Firemen's Union =

Former trade union of the United Kingdom

Humber Amalgamated Steam Trawler Engineers' and Firemen's Union
- Merged into: Transport and General Workers' Union
- Dissolved: 1938
- Location: United Kingdom
- Members: 1,222 (1926)

The Humber Amalgamated Steam Trawler Engineers and Firemen's Union was a trade union in the United Kingdom. It reached a peak membership of 1,222 in 1926. The secretary of the union in 1919 was H. Gibbons. The union had its offices in West Dock Avenue, Hull. Hull was a major centre for the British fishing industry up to the 1970s. The union merged with the Transport and General Workers' Union in 1938.

== See also ==
- Transport and General Workers' Union
- TGWU amalgamations
