= Scottish Primary Teachers' Association =

British trade union

- Scottish Primary Teachers' Association
- Founded: 2011
- Dissolved: 2012
- Headquarters: Dunblane
- Location: Scotland
- Key people: Convener Brenda Bleackley
- Website: www.sptaunion.org.uk

The Scottish Primary Teachers' Association (SPTA) was a Scottish teachers' union founded in August 2011. It was dissolved in September 2012.

== See also ==
- Education in Scotland
