= United Road Transport Union =

British trade union

- Founded: 1890; 136 years ago
- Headquarters: Almond House, Cheadle Hulme, Cheshire
- Location: United Kingdom
- Members: ▼7,577 (2024)
- General Secretary: Robert Monks
- Affiliations: TUC; STUC
- Website: www.urtu.com

The United Road Transport Union (URTU) is a trade union in the United Kingdom. It was founded in 1890 and has a membership of over 8,000. URTU is a union for workers in road haulage, distribution and logistics.

== History ==
URTU was first registered as the United Carters' Association, and was subsequently named the United Carters' Association of England, the United Carters' and Motormen's Association of England, and the United Road Transport Workers' Association of England before assuming its current name in 1964.

Since 1890, there have been only eleven General Secretaries heading the union. At the 1918 UK general election, the union sponsored Alfred Hilton, its then general secretary, as an independent labour candidate in Hulme. He took 12.8% of the vote and third place.

URTU is also a totally independent union and is not affiliated to any political party. It is affiliated to a number of trade union umbrella organisations and trade bodies throughout the world. URTU's influence is particularly strong in member countries of the European Union where we are represented on all the important labour movement committees and within political and government institutions

URTU is organised on democratic principles with the aim of devolving power to the membership. This is exercised through over 500 elected key people working on a local basis as URTU Shop Stewards and Branch Secretaries. The Union's Executive Committee members work on a regional basis with the President being elected on a national basis. All these positions are voluntary.

The General Secretary, who is responsible for the running of the organisation, is in a full-time, salaried position but is subject to election every five years. National and Regional Officers (many are former drivers) are employed full-time and, along with Head Office staff, are protected by normal employee rights and are not subject to election.

Robert Monks is the present General Secretary and Phil Brown is President.

== General secretaries ==
1890: William Almond
1890s: Alfred Astles
1910: Alfred Hilton
1934: J. C. Francis
1950: H. Ashcroft
1956: J. Davies
1963: Jackson Moore
1980s: Frank Griffin
1992: David Higginbottom
2006: Robert Monks

== See also ==
- UK labour law
- List of UK unions
