= National Amalgamated Union of Enginemen, Firemen, Mechanics, Motormen and Electrical Workers =

Former trade union of the United Kingdom

National Union of Enginemen
- National Amalgamated Union of Enginemen, Firemen, Mechanics, Motormen and Electrical Workers
- Merged into: Transport and General Workers' Union
- Founded: 1895
- Dissolved: 1926
- Headquarters: Wellgate, Rotherham
- Location: United Kingdom
- Members: 5,753 (1904)
- Affiliations: TUC, NTWF

The National Amalgamated Union of Enginemen, Firemen, Mechanics, Motormen and Electrical Workers was a trade union in the United Kingdom. It represented stationary engine drivers and cranemen in a wide variety of industries, as well as less skilled workers in the electrical industry and miscellaneous workers.

The union was founded in 1895 as the National Amalgamated Union of Enginemen, Cranemen, Hammer Drivers and Boiler Firemen of Great Britain, before changing its name to the National Amalgamated Enginemen, Cranemen, Hammer, Steam and Electric Tram Drivers and Boiler Firemen in 1901. It was affiliated to the Federation of General Workers.

The union was the largest of its day catering for stationary engine drivers and cranemen, but it long faced competition for members from two older unions: the Amalgamated Protective Union of Engine Drivers, Crane Drivers, Hydraulic and Boiler Attendants, based in London, and the Amalgamated Society of Enginemen, Cranemen, Boilermen and Firemen, based in North East England. Both of these had merged into larger general unions by 1920, leaving the National Amalgamated as the only union dedicated to workers in these trades. Some small unions also existed, such as the National Amalgamated Enginemen's and Firemen's Association, based in Manchester, which joined the National Amalgamated Union in 1908, and the Northern Union Enginemen's Association, which joined in 1921.

The union affiliated to the Transport and General Workers' Union (TGWU) in 1926. It remained a distinct section of the TGWU for many years, its general secretary also serving as national secretary of the TGWU Power Group. In 1945, its members who worked in collieries transferred to the new Power Group of the National Union of Mineworkers.

== General Secretaries ==
1895: G. H. Copley
1905: George Parker
1928: Samuel Hall
1938: Isaac Hayward
1946: William Tudor

== See also ==
- TGWU amalgamations
