= National Union of British Fishermen =

Former trade union of the United Kingdom

- Merged into: Transport and General Workers' Union
- Founded: 1917
- Dissolved: 1922
- Location: United Kingdom
- Members: 5,000 (1919)
- Key people: Captain Bingham

The National Union of British Fishermen was a trade union representing fishermen in the United Kingdom.

The union was founded in 1917 in Grimsby by Captain Bingham, a retired fishing skipper. It was originally known as the Grimsby Fishermen's Trade Union, but by the end of 1919, it also had members in Aberdeen and Fleetwood, and claimed that more than 5,000 fishermen had signed up. The union's chief rival, in terms of membership and blacklegging during disputes, was the National Union of Seamen (NUS). Although Bingham considered amalgamating with the NUS in 1919, he decided to maintain the independence of the union. He instead merged in the local Port of Grimsby Trawl Fishermen's Protective Society, and renamed the organisation as the "National Union of British Fishermen".

The merger was not a success for the union, which lost half of its membership in 1920, many members defecting to the NUS. An unsuccessful industrial dispute in Fleetwood destroyed the local branch that year, while the other branches petered out by 1922, in part due to the economic difficulties of the fishing industry.

At the end of 1922, the union was officially merged with the Transport and General Workers' Union.

== See also ==
- TGWU amalgamations
