= National Union of Vehicle Workers =

The National Union of Vehicle Workers was a trade union representing drivers in the United Kingdom.

The union was founded in 1888 as the London Carmen's Trade Union. By the following year, it had a membership of more than 6,000, but this then began to fall, bottoming out at only 2,000 in 1892. It then slowly began to rise, nearing 6,000 again by 1910.

In 1913, the union was renamed as the "National Union of Vehicle Workers". It affiliated to the National Transport Workers' Federation, and became a founding constituent of the Transport and General Workers' Union in 1922.

== General Secretaries ==
1888: Edward Ballard
1895: Samuel March
1913: Will Godfrey
