= National Union of Docks, Wharves and Shipping Staffs =

Former trade union of the United Kingdom

The National Union of Docks, Wharves and Shipping Staffs (NUDWSS) was a trade union representing administrative staff working in shipping and related industries in the United Kingdom.

The union was founded in 1909 as the Port of London Staff Association, as a replacement for the recently dissolved London and India Docks Staff Association. Until 1917, it worked closely with the Port of London Authority, and appointed one of the authority's members as its honorary president.

In 1917, the organisation decided to register as an independent trade union for the first time, and renamed itself as the Port of London Docks and Wharves Staff Association. Charles Ammon became its secretary in 1918, and Arthur Creech Jones was appointed as its organiser. They launched it on a national basis, renaming it as the "National Union of Docks, Wharves and Shipping Staff", and publishing the Quayside and Office journal. Membership grew to 4,381 by 1922, when it became a founding constituent of the Transport and General Workers' Union.

== General Secretaries ==
1918: Charles Ammon
1919: Alfred Short
