= National Amalgamated Labourers' Union =

Former trade union of the United Kingdom

- National Amalgamated Labourers' Union of Great Britain and Ireland
- Merged into: Transport and General Workers' Union
- Founded: 1889
- Dissolved: 1921
- Headquarters: 1 St David's Place, Rutland Street, Swansea
- Location: United Kingdom
- Members: 10,781 (1920)
- Key people: John Twomey (Gen Sec)
- Affiliations: TUC, Labour, NTWF

The National Amalgamated Labourers' Union (NALU) was a trade union representing unskilled labourers in the United Kingdom.

The union was founded in 1889, initially based in Cardiff, and later in Swansea. Its membership long varied between 3,000 and 4,000, although by the 1910s, it was over 5,000.

The union affiliated to the National Transport Workers' Federation, and in 1922 it merged into the Transport and General Workers' Union.

== General Secretaries ==
1889: Thomas Davies
1890s: Harry Williams
1909: John Twomey
