= Amalgamated Carters, Lurrymen and Motormen's Union =

English trade union

- Merged into: United Vehicle Workers
- Founded: 1890
- Dissolved: 1920
- Headquarters: 77 St George's Road, Bolton
- Location: England
- Members: 5,000 (1918)
- Affiliations: TUC, NTWF

The Amalgamated Carters, Lurrymen and Motormen's Union was a trade union representing commercial road transport workers in the north of England.

== History ==
The union was founded in Bolton in 1890, as the Bolton and District Carters and Lurrymen's Union. It initially grew rapidly, and had 4,149 members by 1892, but this fell to 2,500 the following year. It then grew slowly, reaching 4,000 members again in 1910. The union began recruiting in other areas of northern England, and changed its name to the Amalgamated Carters and Lurrymen's Union, and eventually added "Motormen" to its name.

In 1917, the union joined the National Transport Workers' Federation, and in 1920 it became the North of England Commercial Section of the United Vehicle Workers. At the start of 1922, the United Vehicle Workers merged into the new Transport and General Workers' Union (TGWU), but the North of England Commercial Section retained a high degree of autonomy, and by 1923 had nearly 9,000 members. Only in 1968 was it was fully amalgamated into the TGWU.

== General Secretaries ==
1890s: John Warburton
c.1900: John Parr
1924: Arthur Haines
1929: John W. Walker
1930s: O. Brooks
1942: Fred Eastwood
1943: James Yates
1964: Arthur Quarmby
