= National Union of Dock Labourers =

Former trade union of the United Kingdom

- Merged into: Transport and General Workers' Union
- Founded: 1889
- Dissolved: 1922
- Headquarters: 17 Norton Street, Liverpool
- Location: United Kingdom
- Members: 21,296 (1907)
- Affiliations: NTWF, TUC

The National Union of Dock Labourers (NUDL) was a trade union in the United Kingdom which existed between 1889 and 1922.

== History ==
The union was formed in Glasgow in 1889 but moved its headquarters to Liverpool within a few years, and was thereafter most closely associated with Merseyside. The union retained a strong presence in a number of Scottish ports, but closed its Glasgow branch in 1910 and was replaced locally by the Scottish Union of Dock Labourers, which was formed during the seamen's and dockers strikes of 1911. In Ireland, the NUDL was largely replaced by the Irish Transport and General Workers' Union after 1908.

The NUDL, by this time renamed the National Union of Dock, Riverside and General Workers in Great Britain and Ireland, joined the Transport and General Workers' Union before the end of 1922, although its membership had originally voted not to join the amalgamation earlier in the year. It was therefore not actually a founder member of the TGWU, although it is often falsely credited as being one.

== General secretaries ==
1889: Edward McHugh
1893: James Sexton
