= Amalgamated Society of Watermen, Lightermen and Bargemen =

Former trade union of the United Kingdom

- Merged into: Transport and General Workers' Union
- Founded: 1889
- Dissolved: 1 January 1922
- Headquarters: 31 Great Prescott Street, London
- Location: United Kingdom
- Members: 7,000 (1920)
- Key people: Harry Gosling (General Secretary)
- Affiliations: NTWF

The Amalgamated Society of Watermen, Lightermen and Bargemen was a trade union in the United Kingdom.

The union was founded in 1889 as the Amalgamated Society of Watermen and Lightermen of the River Thames. In 1901, it merged with the Watchmen's Union of the River Thames to form the Amalgamated Society of Watermen, Lightermen and Watchers of the River Thames. It merged with the Medway Sailors and Bargemen's Union in 1912 when it adopted its final name. It merged with the Transport and General Workers' Union in 1922.

== Election results ==
The union affiliated to the Labour Party, and stood its general secretary in the 1918 UK general election.

| Constituency | Candidate | Votes | % | Position |
|---|---|---|---|---|
| Uxbridge | Harry Gosling | 6,251 | 37.6 | 2 |

== See also ==
- List of trade unions
- Transport and General Workers' Union
- TGWU amalgamations
