= National Amalgamated Stevedores and Dockers =

Former trade union of the United Kingdom

- Merged into: Transport and General Workers' Union
- Founded: 1871
- Dissolved: 1982
- Headquarters: 653 Commercial Road, London
- Location: United Kingdom
- Affiliations: TUC

The National Amalgamated Stevedores and Dockers (NASD), sometimes referred to as the National Amalgamated Stevedores' and Dockers' Society, was a trade union in the United Kingdom.

== History ==
The union was founded in 1871 as the Labour Protection League, in response to an attempt by the East and West India Dock Company to cut the pay of dock workers by 25%. It was inspired, in part, by the North East Nine Hours League, and its founders included Patrick Hennessey and Charles Keen of the International Workingmen's Association.

The union's first secretary was John Caulfield, but he immediately ran away with its funds. A Mr Ellwood, appointed as his replacement, was successful in leading the union through several strikes, and the union grew to 30,000 members. However, Ellwood and his committee decided to spend union funds on attending the opening of the South Kensington Museum and providing themselves with a lavish dinner. At the event, Septimus Hansard (reverend of Bethnal Green) gave a declaration of loyalty to the Prince of Wales, which he claimed was on behalf of the union, although this had not been approved. Treasurer Thomas Venner denounced these actions, and this led the union to elect a committee to lead the organisation. Keen stood against Ellwood for the post of general secretary, winning easily, with Ellwood taking only three votes. Venner was elected unopposed as the union's treasurer.

In 1881, the union affiliated to a new body, co-ordinating various organisations representing stevedores. Keen agreed to become its secretary, and he thereafter devoted little time to the union, which existed only to organise joint action between the stevedores and corn porters, who also held membership. Within a few years, the union's executive decided to change its name to the Amalgamated Stevedores' Labour Protection League, and this prompted the corn porters to leave the union. In 1889, they founded a new South Side Labour Protection League, led by Harry Quelch.

The Amalgamated Stevedores' Labour Protection League was involved in the negotiations which led to the formation of the Transport and General Workers' Union (T&G) in 1922, but its members voted not to join the amalgamation. Instead it amalgamated with disaffected members of the Amalgamated Society of Watermen, Lightermen and Bargemen who were unhappy about that union's participation in the formation of the T&G, renaming the union as the National Amalgamated Stevedores, Lightermen, Watermen and Dockers.

In 1925 the watermen and lightermen considered joining the T&G, but instead decided to form their own union, the Watermen, Lightermen, Tugmen and Bargemen's Union. When this was formed in 1927 the remaining part of the union, based entirely in London and Rochester, renamed itself as the National Amalgamated Stevedores and Dockers. Known as the "blue union", on account of the colour of its membership cards, the NASD had a longstanding rivalry with the T&G. In 1954 and 1955, more than 16,000 dockers left the T&G and joined the NASD, principally due to a belief that the T&G leadership were acting against their interests, to aid the Labour Party, and because the NASD was willing to support strike action on working hours and conditions. The Trades Union Congress (TUC) found that the NASD had breached its policies in recruiting these members, and required it to return them, but the NASD argued that this would be unlawful, and therefore refused to comply. The NASD was expelled from the TUC in 1959, and most of the recently recruited members left, and by 1972 it was back down to 6,000 members.

The NASD finally amalgamated with the T&G in 1982.

== General Secretaries ==
1871: John Caulfield
1871: Ellwood
1872: Charles Keen
1885: Tom McCarthy
1889:
1890s: James Anderson
1917: J. Wood
1919: J. B. Ruark
W. Moore Turner
1940s: Dick Barrett
1955: Charlie Stebbing
c.1970: Les Newman
