= Transport and General Workers' Union =

British and Irish trade union (1922–2007)

- Abbreviation: T&G; TGWU; ATGWU
- Predecessor: (See: TGWU amalgamations)
- Merged into: Unite the Union
- Founded: 1 January 1922; 104 years ago
- Dissolved: 1 May 2007; 19 years ago
- Type: Trade union
- Headquarters: London, England
- Location(s): United Kingdom and Ireland
- Members: 800,000 (2006)
- General Secretary: Ernest Bevin (first); Tony Woodley (last)
- Publication: TGWU Record
- Affiliations: Trades Union Congress; Irish Congress of Trade Unions; Scottish Trades Union Congress; International Transport Workers' Federation; IUF; Labour Party (UK); Labour Party (Ireland)
- Website: tgwu.org.uk

The Transport and General Workers' Union (TGWU or T&G) was one of the largest general trade unions in the United Kingdom and Ireland—where it was known as the Amalgamated Transport and General Workers' Union (Note: The union operated under this name in Ireland so as to differentiate itself from the older Irish Transport and General Workers' Union) (ATGWU)—with 900,000 members (and was once the largest trade union in the world).

The TGWU was officially founded on 1 January 1922 with the amalgamation of 14 individual trades unions. Ernest Bevin served as the union's first and longest serving General Secretary.

In 2007, the union voted to merge with Amicus to form Unite the Union.

== History ==
=== Establishment ===
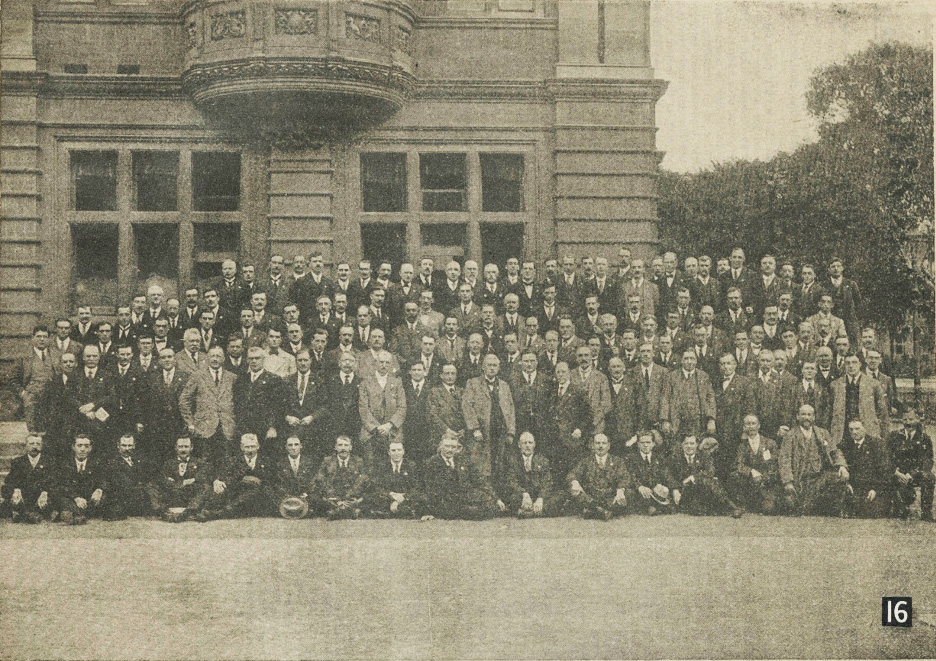
Founding delegates of the TGWU in 1921 at a conference in Leamington

In March 1920, the London-based Dock, Wharf, Riverside & General Labourers' Union (DWRGLU) began talks on forming a unified dockworkers' union with the Liverpool-based National Union of Dock, Riverside and General Workers (NUDRW).

The two unions' delegations agreed on a provisional amalgamation committee with Ernest Bevin as its Secretary, and Harry Gosling as its chair, with the committee agreeing to invite other unions related to the docks industry.

In ballots of the various unions on amalgamation, only the ballots put to the Amalgamated Stevedores Labour Protection League, the Scottish Union of Dock Labourers (SUDW) and the Cardiff Coal Trimmers memberships failed.

While the new union was being established, the official publication of the union, The Record, published its first issue in August 1921. The first issue cited its predecessor publications as the Dockers' Record of the DWRGLU; Quayside and Office of the National Union of Docks, Wharves and Shipping Staffs; The Record of the United Vehicle Workers; and The Vehicle Worker of the National Union of Vehicle Workers.

On 1 January 1922, fourteen trades unions (Note: The founding unions of the Transport and General Workers' Union were: Amalgamated Society of Watermen, Lightermen & Bargemen; Amalgamated Carters, Lurrymen & Motormen’s Union; Amalgamated Association of Carters & Motormen; Associated Horsemen’s Union; Dock, Wharf, Riverside & General Labourers Union (DWR&GLU); National Amalgamated Labourers’ Union (NALU); National Union of Docks, Wharves & Shipping Staffs (NUDWSS); National Union of Ships’ Clerks, Grain Weighers & Coalmeters; National Union of Vehicle Workers; National Amalgamated Coal Workers' Union; North of England Trimmers’ & Teamers’ Association; North of Scotland Horse & Motormen’s Association; South Side Labour Protection League; United Vehicle Workers) officially amalgamated to form the Transport and General Workers' Union (TGWU), with Ernest Bevin as its first General Secretary. At amalgamation the union had 300,000 members.

The Irish Transport and General Workers' Union (ITGWU) had tentatively taken part in the negotiations, however the talks with the ITGWU broke down. The ITGWU initially challenged the name of the TGWU, claiming that the similar titles would cause confusion. Compromise was reached when the TGWU agreed to operate under the name Amalgamated Transport and General Workers' Union (ATGWU) within Ireland.

The NUDRW amalgamated into the TGWU later in 1922, and despite initially voting against the ballot, so did the SUDW. Through the NUDRW and the DWR&GLU, the TGWU inherited a number of active branches in Ireland in Belfast, Carrick-on-Suir, Clonmel, Cork, Derry, Drogheda, Dundalk, Newry and Waterford. The Irish membership of the TGWU in 1922 amounted to 8,000, or just over 2.65% of the union's total membership.

=== Early years ===
For the first two years of its existence, the TGWU lost members, and continued to lose members for another four out of eight years.

In 1923, an unofficial London dock strike caused a fissure in the TGWU, and resulted in some docks members joining the now-rival Amalgamated Stevedores Labour Protection League union. While the issue failed to create a larger defection, the two unions would come into conflict multiple times.

In 1929, the Workers' Union amalgamated into the TGWU. Despite being named as a general workers union, the TGWU was primarily made up of workers in the union's four transport Trade Groups—Docks, Waterways, Commercial Road Transport, and Passenger Road Transport. As of 1928, the four transport groups made up 220,000 members of the TGWU in comparison the General Workers Trade Group which constituted only 68,000. With amalgamation, the TGWU's membership increased by 100,000 members, the majority of whom joined its General Workers Group, making the group the largest. This increase in General Trade Group members garnered the Union the recognition and infrastructure to recruit new members outside of the transport sector.

== Structure ==
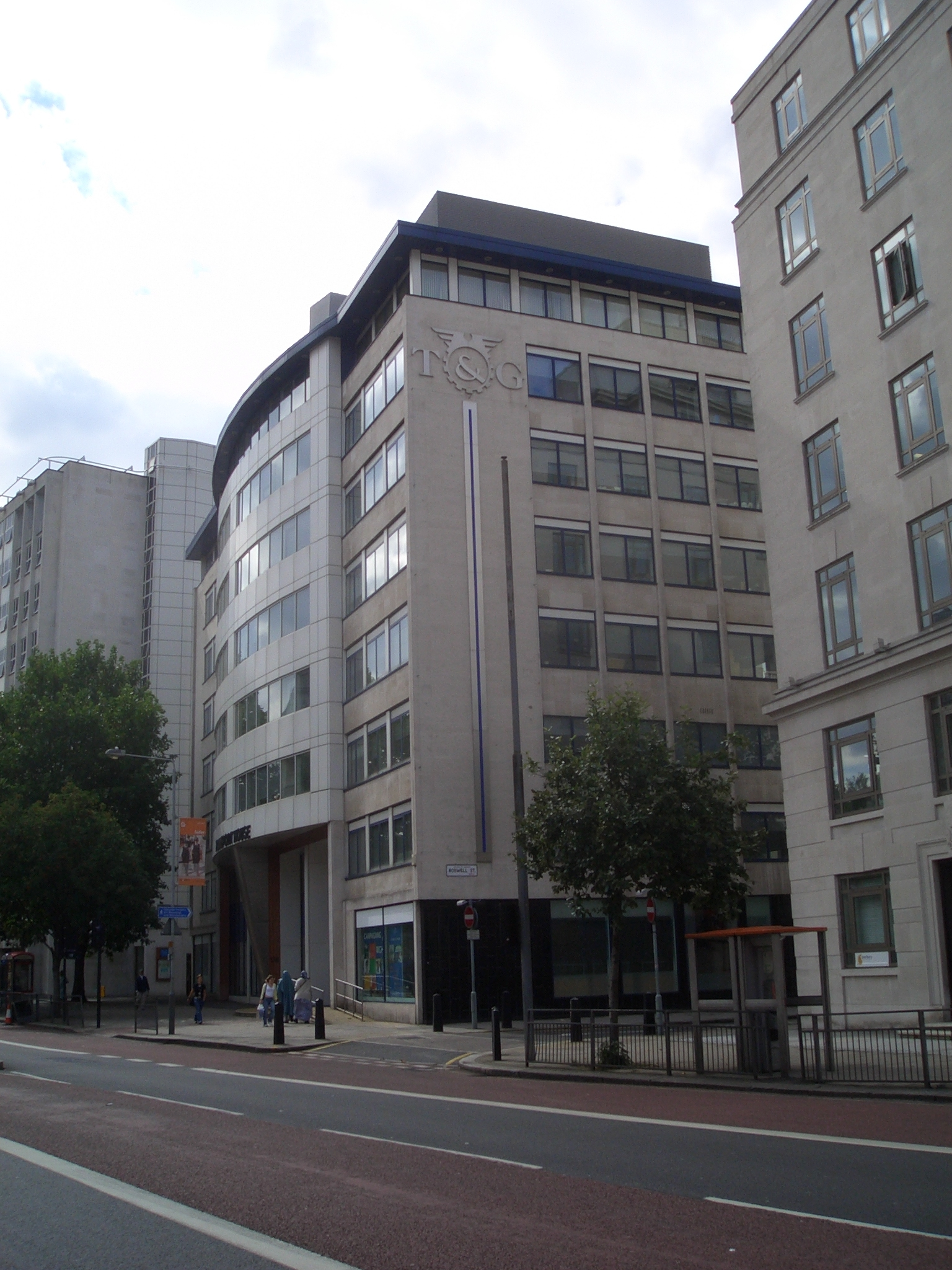
TGWU Central Office Transport House in London, 2005

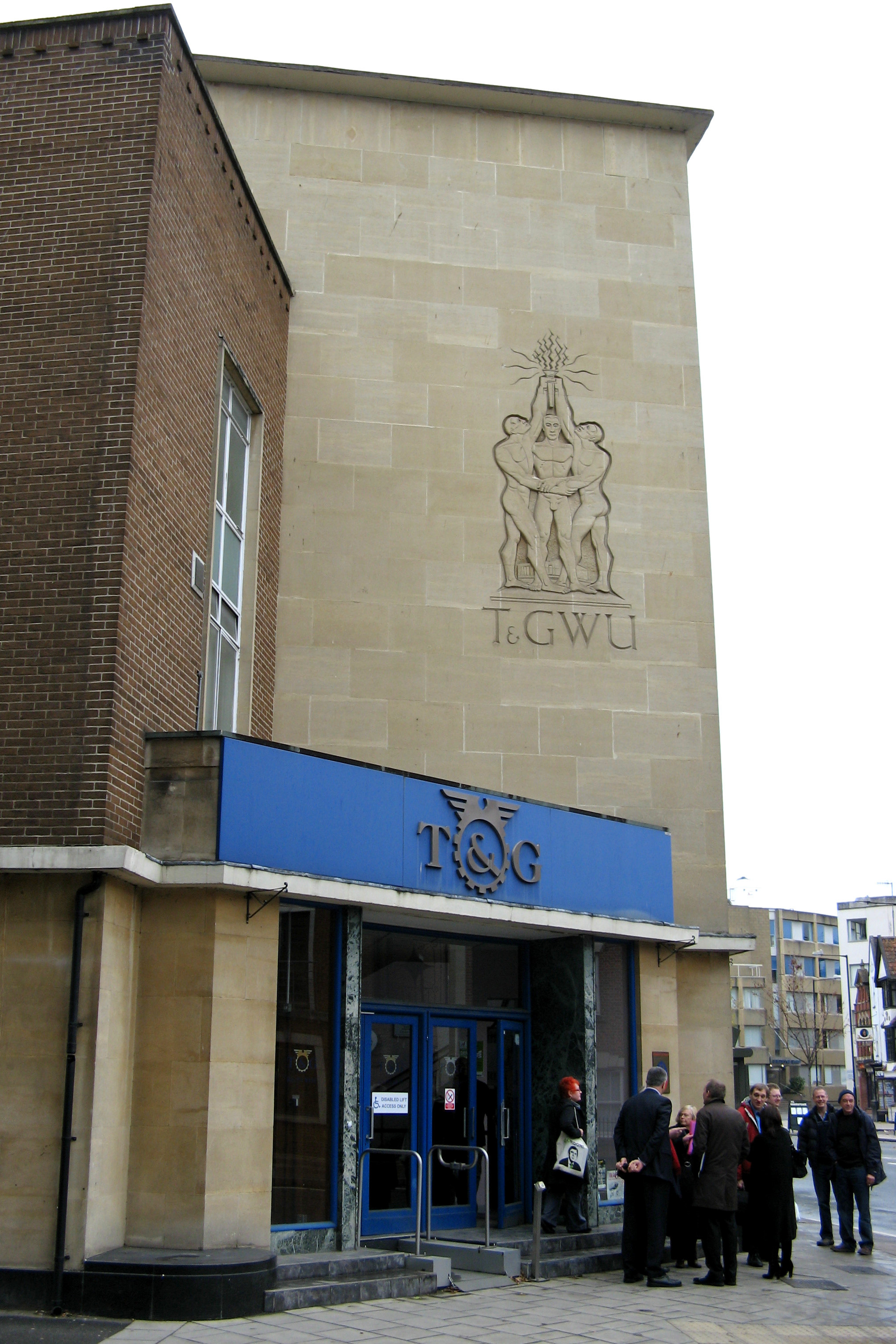
TGWU Bristol office, 2007

The Transport and General Workers' Union structure combined regional organisation, based on Districts and Areas, with committee organisation by occupation, based on six broad Trade Groups. Trade groups were not closely linked to trades, but were elected by activists. Officials of the union were grouped by region, and could be asked to serve each or any trade group.

=== Docks Group ===
The Docks Group was created in 1922 to represent members of the following unions:

- Dock, Wharf, Riverside and General Labourers' Union of Great Britain and Ireland
- South Side Labour Protection League (London, est. 1889)
- National Amalgamated Coal Workers' Union (London, est. 1889)
- National Amalgamated Labourers' Union (Cardiff, est. 1889)
- North of England Trimmers' and Teemers' Association (est. 1871)

The group originally had a subsection for coal shipping. In 1928, it had 96,000 members, but over time, membership of the group declined along with employment on the docks, dropping to 56,000 in 1966, and had 51,153 in 1980.

=== Waterways Group ===
The Waterways Group was created in 1922 to represent members of the Amalgamated Society of Watermen, Lightermen and Bargemen. Always one of the smallest sections, it had only 8,000 members in 1928, and 16,000 in 1966. In 1970, it was merged into the Docks Group.

=== Administrative, Clerical and Supervisory Group ===
The Administrative, Clerical and Supervisory Group was created in 1922 to represent members of the following unions:

- National Association of Ships' Clerks, Grain Weighers and Coalmeters
- National Union of Docks, Wharves and Shipping Staffs

There was often ambiguity in the TGWU over the actual name of its white-collar section. From the 1960s it was generally known as ACTS (Administrative, Clerical, Technical and Supervisory) but also sometimes as the ACTSS (Association of Clerical, Technical and Supervisory Staff) and enamel union badges bearing both sets of initials were produced for members. It was noted for an enquiry by the Certification Office in 2006 into board members who had joined the union within six months of being elected to senior posts.

The group grew significantly over time, having only 5,000 members in 1928, but 62,000 by 1966, and 149,801 members in 1980.

=== Road Transport (Passenger and Commercial) Groups ===
The Road Transport group was created in 1922 to represent members of the following unions:

- Amalgamated Association of Carters and Motormen (Leeds, est. 1916)
- Amalgamated Carters, Lurrymen and Motormen's Union (Bolton, est. 1890)
- Associated Horsemen's Union (Greenock, est. 1894)
- National Union of Vehicle Workers
- North of Scotland Horse and Motormen's Association (Dundee, 1911)
- United Vehicle Workers

Later in 1922, the group was split into Road Transport (Passenger) and Road Transport (Commercial) groups. The Passenger group had 79,000 members in 1928 and 181,000 in 1966, but by 1980, the renamed Passenger Services group had dropped to only 44,501 members. The Commercial Services group rose from 37,000 members in 1928 to 219,000 in 1966, and 226,290 in 1980.

=== General Workers Group ===
The General Workers Group was created in 1922 to cater for all workers in jobs which did not fall into another group. Initially, it had subsections for workers in metal and chemical trades. Once it was considered that a particular field had enough members to justify its own trade group, it was split out. These decisions were made at the Biennial Delegate Conference, and although there were many applications to form new trade groups, most were unsuccessful. The group had 68,000 members in 1928, and it then doubled in size when the Workers' Union merged into the TGWU. By 1966, it had 338,000 members and, despite the splitting out of further groups in 1970, by 1980 it still had 269,845 members.

The first groups to be split out were:

- Power Workers, formed in 1926 from the National Amalgamated Union of Enginemen, Firemen, Mechanics, Motormen and Electrical Workers. It had 20,000 members in 1928, rising to 41,000 by 1966.
- Engineering, formed in 1931, principally from members of the Workers' Union. By 1966, it had 269,000 members.
- Government, formed in 1943, with 58,000 members by 1966.
- Municipal, formed in 1945, with 44,000 members by 1966.
- Agricultural, formed in 1945, with 13,000 members by 1966.
- joined by the National Union of Agricultural and Allied Workers
- Building, formed in 1953, with 53,000 members by 1966.
- Chemical, formed in 1953, with 61,000 members by 1966.

=== Later mergers ===
The Scottish Union of Dock Labourers and the National Union of Dock, Riverside and General Workers in Great Britain and Ireland initially voted not to amalgamate as founding members, but a new voted changed their position, and they joined before the end of 1922, along with the Amalgamated Carters, Lurrymen and Motormen's Union, the Greenock Sugar Porters' Union, the Dundee Flax and Jute Stowers' Society, the National Union of British Fishermen, and the Belfast Breadservers' Association. Some of these unions retained a great deal of autonomy and in many ways effectively functioned as separate unions, even being registered separately with the Registrar of Friendly Societies The biggest merger was with the Workers' Union in 1929, the union being fully integrated into the TGWU in 1931.

== Campaigns ==
The Transport and General Workers' Union spearheaded the campaign for the registration of Gangmasters in the UK, sponsoring an Act of Parliament which received the Royal Assent on 8 July 2004.

== Merger with Amicus ==
During 2005 discussions started between the TGWU, Amicus and the GMB about the possibility of merging the three unions into one organisation with potentially 2.5 million members covering almost every sector of the economy. On 14 June 2006 the GMB Conference voted not to continue with discussions.

The TGWU and Amicus proceeded without GMB involvement, with delegates from the two unions approving the proposed 'Instrument of Amalgamation' at a special conference on 18 December 2006. The ballot of both unions' membership during February and early March 2007, approved the merger. The result of the ballot was announced on 8 March 2007: 86.4 per cent of T&G members and 70.1 per cent of Amicus members voted to support the merger, from a turnout of 27% in both cases.

The press release announced that the resulting union had the working title "New Union" and the name would be decided by a ballot of the membership. On 2 April 2007, The Times reported that the name Unite had been chosen. and that full merger of rule books and governing bodies might soon follow the existing merger of personnel and finance departments.

It was negotiated that both Derek Simpson, General Secretary of Amicus, and Tony Woodley General Secretary of TGWU, would serve as Joint-General Secretaries of Unite until December 2010 and that Tony Woodley would serve alone until January 2012. Despite this Woodley resigned January 2011, a year earlier than planned.

== Affiliations ==
- Labour Party (UK)
- Labour Party (Republic of Ireland)
- Trades Union Congress (TUC)
- Irish Congress of Trade Unions (ICTU)
- Scottish Trades Union Congress (STUC)
- International Transport Workers' Federation (ITF)
- International Metalworkers' Federation (IMF)
- Union Network International (UNI)
- International Union of Food, Agricultural, Hotel, Restaurant, Catering, Tobacco and Allied Workers' Association (IUF)
- Public Services International (PSI)
- International Federation of Building and Woodworkers (IFBW)
- International Textile, Garment and Leather Workers' Federation (ITLGW)
- International Federation of Chemical, Energy, Mine and General Workers' Unions (ICEM)

Regions – particularly Region One which covered London, the South East and Eastern England, also had a tradition of donating to other causes, as did branch committees, which controlled a substantial proportion of membership income.

== Officers ==
=== General Secretaries ===
1922: Ernest Bevin
1945: Arthur Deakin (acting from 1940)
1955: Jock Tiffin
1956: Frank Cousins
1964: Harry Nicholas (acting)
1969: Jack Jones
1978: Moss Evans
1985: Ron Todd
1992: Bill Morris
2003: Tony Woodley

=== Deputy General Secretaries ===
1974: Harry Urwin
1980: Alec Kitson
1986: Bill Morris
1992: Jack Adams
1999: Margaret Prosser
2002: Tony Woodley
2003: Jack Dromey

=== Assistant General Secretaries ===
1924: John Cliff
1935: Arthur Deakin
1945: Harold Clay
1948: Jock Tiffin
1955: Frank Cousins
1956: Harry Nicholas
1968: Harry Urwin
1974: Vacant
1985: Eddie Haigh and Larry Smith
1988: Eddie Haigh
1991: Vacant?
1999: Barry Camfield and Jimmy Elsby

== Amalgamations ==
The list of TGWU amalgamations highlights the scale of the TGWU policy of mergers, amalgamations and transfers of engagements, which contributed to its membership growth and the spread of its membership base.

== See also ==
- Bristol Bus Boycott, in 1963 when the Bristol Omnibus Company, in conjunction with the TGWU, refused to employ Black or Asian bus crews. After four months the company and union backed down and overturned their policy
- List of TGWU amalgamations
- Transport House
