= List of affiliates of the Trades Union Congress =

This is a list of affiliates of the Trades Union Congress, that is, member trade unions of the Trades Union Congress.

== Current affiliates ==
Name	Acronym	Founded	Affiliated
Accord	Accord	1978	1996
Advance	Advance	1944	1998
Aegis the Union	Aegis	1971	2010
Artists' Union England	AUE	2014	2016
Associated Society of Locomotive Engineers and Firemen	ASLEF	1880	1886
Association of Educational Psychologists	AEP	1962	1999
Association of Flight Attendants	AFA	1945	
Bakers, Food and Allied Workers Union	BFAWU	1847	1874
British Airline Pilots' Association	BALPA	1933	1947
British Dietetic Association	BDA	1936	1997
British Orthoptic Society Trade Union	BOSTU	1937	1996
Chartered Society of Physiotherapy	CSP	1894	1992
Communication Workers Union	CWU	1995	1995
Community	Community	2004	2004
Educational Institute of Scotland	EIS	1847	1977
Equity	Equity	1930	1931
FDA	FDA	1918	1977
Fire Brigades Union	FBU	1918	1924
GMB	GMB	1924	1924
Hospital Consultants and Specialists Association	HCSA	1948	1979
Musicians' Union	MU	1893	1894
National Association of Probation Officers	NAPO	1912	1984
National Association of Head Teachers	NAHT	1897	2014
National Association of Racing Staff	NARS	1975	2009
National Association of Schoolmasters Union of Women Teachers	NASUWT	1976	1976
National Education Union	NEU	2017	2017
National House Building Council Staff Association	NHBCSA	1980	
National Society for Education in Art and Design	NSEAD	1984	2018
National Union of Journalists	NUJ	1907	1920
National Union of Mineworkers	NUM	1888	1889
Nationwide Group Staff Union	NGSU	1990	1999
Nautilus UK	Nautilus	1985	1985
Prison Officers Association	POA	1939	1967
Professional Footballers' Association	PFA	1907	1995
Prospect	Prospect	2001	2001
Public and Commercial Services Union	PCS	1998	1998
National Union of Rail, Maritime and Transport Workers	RMT	1990	1990
Royal College of Midwives	RCM	1947	2015
Royal College of Podiatry	RCPod	1912	1997
Society of Radiographers	SoR	1920	1990
Transport Salaried Staffs' Association	TSSA	1897	1903
Undeb Cenedlaethol Athrawon Cymru	UCAC	1940	1995
Union of Shop, Distributive and Allied Workers	USDAW	1947	1947
Unison	Unison	1993	1993
Unite the Union	Unite	2007	2007
United Road Transport Union	URTU	1890	
University and College Union	UCU	2006	2006
Writers' Guild of Great Britain	WGGB	1959	1975

== Former affiliates ==
Affiliated unions were placed in an industrial group until 1983. Group information is from Jack Eaton and Colin Gill (1981) The Trade Union Directory, London: Pluto Press for all unions affiliated as of 1981. For unions which left before this date, information is from the last relevant annual report of the TUC

=== Mining and Quarrying ===
Name	Acronym	Joined	Reason not affiliated	Year left	Affiliated membership (1921)	Affiliated membership (1950)	Affiliated membership (1980)
Amalgamated National Union of Quarryworkers and Settmakers	ANUQ&S	1918	Merged into GMB	1934	8,922	6,439	N/A
British Association of Colliery Management – Technical, Energy and Administrative Management	BACM-TEAM	1977	Merged into Prospect	2014	N/A	N/A	17,160
Colliery Under-Managers' Association of Scotland		1920		1932	540	N/A	N/A
Forest of Dean Colliery Enginemen's, Stokers' and Craftsmen's Association		1921		1921	650	N/A	N/A
Furness Iron Miners' and Quarrymen's Union		1891		1921	N/A	N/A	N/A
Lancashire, Cheshire and North Wales Colliery Under-Managers' and Underlookers' Association					300	N/A	N/A
Miners' Federation of Great Britain	MFGB	1890	Reformed as NUM	1945	900,000	N/A	N/A
National Association of Colliery Overmen, Deputies and Shotfirers	NACODS		Disaffiliated	2016	20,000	26,524	19,146
National Coal Board Labour Staff Association	LSA	1957	Dissolved	1971	N/A	N/A	N/A
National Federation of Colliery Officials		1945	Merged into NUM	1947	N/A	N/A	N/A
National Union of Shale Miners and Oil Workers		1924	Merged into TGWU	1962	N/A	3,000	N/A
North Wales Quarrymen's Union	NWQU		Merged into TGWU	1960	7,000	N/A	N/A
Scottish Colliery Enginemen's, Boilermen's and Tradesmen's Association	SCEBTA	1921	Merged into NUM	1945	N/A	N/A	N/A

=== Railways ===
Of the unions in this section, the Associated Society of Locomotive Engineers and Firemen and the Transport Salaried Staffs' Association remaining members of the TUC.

Name	Acronym	Joined	Reason not affiliated	Year left	Affiliated membership			
Name	Acronym	Joined	Reason not affiliated	Year left	1890	1920	1950	1980
Amalgamated Society of Railway Servants	ASRS		Merged into NUR	1913	33,000	N/A	N/A	N/A
Amalgamated Society of Railway Servants of Scotland			Merged into ASRS	1892	6,700	N/A	N/A	N/A
General Railway Workers' Union	GRWU		Merged into NUR	1913	20,000	N/A	N/A	N/A
National Union of Railwaymen	NUR	1913	Merged into RMT	1990	N/A	481,000	421,197	180,000

=== Transport (other than railways) ===
Of the unions which held membership of this group, the United Road Transport Union remains a member of the TUC.

Name	Acronym	Joined	Reason not affiliated	Year left	Affiliated membership (1921)	Affiliated membership (1950)	Affiliated membership (1980)
Amalgamated Carters, Lurrymen and Motormen's Union					6,000	N/A	N/A
Amalgamated Marine Workers' Union	AMWU	1922				N/A	N/A
Association of Dairymen's Assistants			Merged into NUVW	1920	N/A	N/A	N/A
Cardiff, Penarth and Barry Coal Trimmers' Union			Merged into TGWU	1967	1,600	420	N/A
Grimsby Steam and Diesel Fishing Vessels Engineers' and Firemen's Union			Expelled	1973	1,000	900	N/A
Hull Seamen's Union					2,000	N/A	N/A
Liverpool and District Carters' and Motormen's Union	LDCMU				10,000	N/A	N/A
Merchant Navy and Airline Officers Association	MNAOA	1956	Merged into NUMAST	1985	N/A	N/A	25,050
National Amalgamated Coal Workers' Union			Merged into TGWU	1922	6,000	N/A	N/A
National Amalgamated Labourers' Union	NALU		Merged into TGWU	1922	9,112	N/A	N/A
National Amalgamated Stevedores and Dockers	NASD		Expelled	1959	5,568	6,798	N/A
National Union of Dock, Riverside and General Workers	DRGWU		Merged into TGWU	1922	65,000	N/A	N/A
National Union of Marine, Aviation and Shipping Transport Officers	NUMAST	1985	Merged into Nautilus	2009	N/A	N/A	N/A
National Union of Seamen	NUS		Merged into RMT	1990	75,000	60,000	47,046
National Union of Ship's Stewards, Cooks, Butchers and Bakers			Merged into AMWU	1921	12,000	N/A	N/A
National Union of Vehicle Workers	NUVW		Merged into TGWU	1922	28,000	N/A	N/A
Navigators' and Engineer Officers' Union	NEOU	1936	Merged into MNAOA	1956	N/A	11,000	N/A
North of England Trimmers' and Teemers' Association			Merged into TGWU	1922	1,300	N/A	N/A
North of Scotland Horse and Motormen's Association			Merged into TGWU	1922	2,000	N/A	N/A
Radio and Electronic Officers Union	REOU		Merged into NUMAST	1985	N/A	5,300	3,691
Scottish Commercial Motormen's Union	SCMU	1940	Merged into TGWU	1971	N/A	21,000	N/A
Scottish Union of Dock Labourers	SUDL		Merged into TGWU	1922	3,700	2,100	N/A
Transport and General Workers Union	TGWU		Merged into Unite	2007	N/A	1,253,208	2,086,281
United Vehicle Workers	UVW	1919	Merged into TGWU	1922	100,000	N/A	N/A
Watermen, Lightermen, Tugmen and Bargemen's Union		1957	Merged into TGWU	1971	6,944	N/A	N/A
Weaver Watermen's Association			Merged into TGWU	1926	350	N/A	N/A

=== Shipbuilding ===
Name	Acronym	Joined	Reason not affiliated	Year left	Affiliated membership (1921)	Affiliated membership (1950)	Affiliated membership (1980)
Amalgamated Society of Boilermakers, Shipwrights, Blacksmiths and Structural Workers	ASB		Merged into GMB	1982	100,000	82,883	129,712
Amalgamated Union of Sailmakers		1953	Merged into UCATT	1971	N/A	N/A	N/A
Associated Blacksmiths', Forge and Smithy Workers' Society	ABFSWS		Merged into USB	1963	22,000	11,275	N/A
Iron, Steel and Wood Barge Builders and Helpers Association			Merged into TGWU	1973	500	864	N/A
Shipconstructors' and Shipwrights' Association	SSA		Merged into USB	1963	47,468	25,963	N/A

=== Engineering, Founding and Vehicle Building ===
Name	Acronym	Joined	Reason not affiliated	Year left	Affiliated membership (1921)	Affiliated membership (1950)	Affiliated membership (1980)
Amalgamated Engineering Union	AEU		Merged into AEEU	1992	407,000	714,468	1,309,553
Amalgamated Engineering and Electrical Union	AEEU	1992	Merged into Amicus	c. 2001	N/A	N/A	N/A
Amalgamated Instrument Makers' Society	AIMS		Merged into AEU	1920	N/A	N/A	N/A
Amalgamated Machine, Engine and Iron Grinders' and Glaziers' Society			Merged into AEU	1956	800	357	N/A
Amalgamated Moulders and Kindred Industries Trade Union			Merged into AUFW	1967		2,500	N/A
Amalgamated Society of Blacksmiths, Farriers and Agricultural Engineers			Dissolved	1963	4,341	700	N/A
Amalgamated Society of Brassworkers			Merged into MDKTS	1964	540	640	N/A
Amalgamated Society of General Tool Makers, Engineers and Machinists			Merged into ASE	1920	N/A	N/A	N/A
Amalgamated Society of Glass Works Engineers		1935	Merged into AEU	1944	N/A	N/A	N/A
Amalgamated Society of Vehicle Builders, Carpenters and Mechanics			Merged into AEU	1945	10,000	N/A	N/A
Amalgamated Wheelwrights, Smiths and Kindred Trades Union			Merged into NUVB	1925	11,000	N/A	N/A
Amalgamated Union of Foundry Workers	AUFW	1946	Merged into AEU	1967	N/A	78,273	N/A
Amicus	Amicus	2002	Merged into Unite	2007	N/A	N/A	N/A
Associated Metalworkers Union	AMU		Disaffiliated	1987		4,150	6,007
Associated Society of Moulders and Foundry Workers		1942	Merged into AUFW	1966	N/A	486	N/A
Association of Patternmakers and Allied Craftsmen	APAC		Merged into AUEW-TASS	1984	12,506	15,678	9,571
Association of Supervisory Staffs, Executives and Technicians	ASSET		Merged into ASTMS	1968	3,500		N/A
Constructional Engineering Union	CEU	1930	Merged into AUEW	1971	N/A	19,472	N/A
Engineering and Fastener Trade Union	EFTU	1956	Dissolved	2004	N/A	N/A	2,500
General Iron Fitters' Association			Merged into GMWU	1968	2,000	2,727	N/A
Heating and Domestic Engineers' Union	H&DEU		Merged into NUSMWC	1967	7,000	13,956	N/A
Ironfounding Workers' Association			Merged into AUFW	1946	6,944	N/A	N/A
Military and Orchestral Musical Instrument Makers' Trade Society			Dissolved	2001	N/A	159	226
National Engineers' Association	NEA	1944	Dissolved	1963	N/A	870	N/A
National Society of Coppersmiths, Braziers and Metal Workers			Merged into NUSMWC	1959	4,000	6,000	N/A
National Society of Metal Mechanics	NSMM		Merged into AUEW-TASS	1985	52,000	33,670	50,369
National Union of Domestic Appliances and General Operatives	NUDAGO		Merged into Community	2006–2007	4,216	5,996	5,500
National Union of Foundry Workers	NUFW		Merged into AUFW	1946	65,526	N/A	N/A
National Union of Scalemakers			Merged into MSF	1993	960	2,539	1,937
National Union of Sheet Metal Workers, Coppersmiths and Heating and Domestic Engineers	NUSMWCHDE		Merged into AUEW-TASS	1983	16,000	38,038	75,000
National Union of Vehicle Builders	NUVB		Merged into TGWU	1972	24,000	55,000	N/A
National Winding and General Engineers' Society			Merged into TGWU	1935	5,000	N/A	N/A
North of England Engineers' and Firemen's Amalgamation					720	N/A	N/A
Scottish Brassturners', Fitters', Finishers' and Instrument Makers' Association			Merged into AEU	1965	1,200	1,247	N/A
Society of Shuttlemakers	SS	1928	Dissolved	1993	N/A	595	110
Steam Engine Makers' Society	SEM		Merged into AEU	1920	N/A	N/A	N/A
United Machine Workers' Association	UMWA		Merged into AEU	1920	N/A	N/A	N/A
United Operative Spindle and Flyer Makers' Trade and Friendly Society			Merged into AEU	1962	1,000	650	N/A
West of Scotland Brassturners, Fitters and Finishers					N/A	N/A	N/A
Wheelwrights' and Coachmakers' Operatives Union		1934	Merged into NUVB	1947	N/A	N/A	N/A

=== Technical Engineering and Scientific ===
Name	Acronym	Joined	Reason not affiliated	Year left	Affiliated membership		
Name	Acronym	Joined	Reason not affiliated	Year left	1920	1950	1980
Amalgamated Union of Engineering Workers - Technical Administrative and Supervisory Section	AUEW-TASS	1918	Merged into MSF	1988	12,000	46,003	200,954
Association of Scientific, Technical and Managerial Staffs	ASTMS	1969	Merged into MSF	1988	N/A	N/A	491,000
Engineers' and Managers' Association	EMA	1942	Merged into Prospect	c. 2001	N/A	11,243	48,000
Manufacturing, Science and Finance	MSF	1988	Merged into Amicus	c. 2001	N/A	N/A	N/A

=== Electricity ===
Name	Acronym	Joined	Reason not affiliated	Year left	Affiliated membership		
Name	Acronym	Joined	Reason not affiliated	Year left	1920	1950	1980
Electrical, Electronic, Telecommunication and Plumbing Trade Union	EETPU	1968	Merged into AEEU	1992	N/A	N/A	420,000
Electrical Trades Union	ETU	1891	Merged into EETPU	1968	45,000	187,520	N/A
National Union of Enginemen, Firemen, Mechanics and Electrical Workers	NUEFMEW	1895	Merged into TGWU	1967	40,000	36,334	N/A

=== Iron and Steel and Minor Metal Trades ===
Name	Acronym	Joined	Reason not affiliated	Year left	Affiliated membership (1921)	Affiliated membership (1950)	Affiliated membership (1980)
Amalgamated Anvil and Vice Trade Association					500	N/A	N/A
Bedstead Workers' Association			Dissolved	1961	1,800	296	N/A
Birmingham and Midland Sheet Metal Workers' Society	BMSMWS		Merged into NUSMWCHDE	1973	3,352	7,893	N/A
British Roll Turners Trade Society	BRTTS	1942	Merged into AUEW	1983	N/A	890	644
Chain Makers and Strikers Association	CMSA		Expelled	1973	1,850	1,162	N/A
Edge Tool Trades Society					1,000	N/A	N/A
Harness and Saddlery Furniture Trades Association					500	N/A	N/A
Iron and Steel Trades Confederation	ISTC		Merged into Community	c. 2004	133,000	100,161	104,275
Laminated and Coil Spring Workers' Union		1944	Merged into ASBSBSW	1977	N/A	700	N/A
Midland Counties Trades Federation	MCTF		1941	Dissolved	1,000	N/A	N/A
National Amalgamated Association of Nut and Bolt Makers			Disaffiliated	1955	500	30	N/A
National Cutlery Union		1930	Merged into NUGMW	1957	N/A	1,068	N/A
National Society of Amalgamated Metal Wire and Tube Workers					3,000	N/A	N/A
National Union of Blastfurnacemen, Ore Miners, Coke Workers and Kindred Trades	NUB		Merged into ISTC	1985	22,000	19,150	13,959
National Union of Gold, Silver and Allied Trades	NUGSAT		Merged into AUEW-TASS	1981	7,000	4,038	2,149
National Union of Lock and Metal Workers	NULMW		Merged into TGWU	c. 2004	1,000	4,246	6,843
Scissor Grinders' Trade Society					180	N/A	N/A
Sheffield Amalgamated Union of File Trades			Merged into TGWU	1970	2,400	1,440	N/A
Sheffield Sawmakers' Protection Society	SSPS	1945	Merged into TGWU	1984	N/A	450	238
Sheffield Wool Shear Workers Union	SWSWU	1930	Dissolved	2007	N/A	90	30
Society of Goldsmiths, Jewellers and Kindred Trades			Merged into NUGSAT	1969	1,000	1,932	N/A
Spring Trapmakers Society			Dissolved	1988	N/A	90	
United Association of Welsh Artizans					1,985	N/A	N/A
United Society of Spring Fitters and Vicemen					800	N/A	N/A
Wire Workers' Union	WWU	1924	Merged into ISTC	1991	N/A	10,709	9,770

=== Building, Woodworking and Furnishing ===
Name	Acronym	Joined	Reason not affiliated	Year left	Affiliated membership (1921)	Affiliated membership (1950)	Affiliated membership (1980)
Altogether Builders' Labourers and Constructional Workers' Society			Merged into TGWU	1934	35,000	N/A	N/A
Amalgamated Slaters' Society of Scotland					1,320	N/A	N/A
Amalgamated Slaters, Tilers and Roofing Operatives Society		1948	Merged into AUBTW	1969	N/A	2,385	N/A
Amalgamated Society of Carpenters and Joiners	ASC&J		Merged into ASW	1921	N/A	N/A	N/A
Amalgamated Society of Painters and Decorators	ASPD		Merged into ASWD	1970	73,656	76,568	N/A
Amalgamated Society of Woodcutting Machinists	ASWM		Merged into FTAT	1971	22,000	30,806	N/A
Amalgamated Society of Woodworkers	ASW		Merged into ASWD	1970	113,591	198,000	N/A
Amalgamated Society of Woodworkers and Decorators	ASWD	1970	Merged into UCATT	1971	N/A	N/A	N/A
Amalgamated Union of Asphalt Workers	AUAW	1934	Merged into TGWU	1987	N/A	2,500	2,680
Amalgamated Union of Building Trade Workers	AUBTW	1921	Merged into UCATT	1971	79,000	82,803	N/A
Amalgamated Union of Upholsterers	AUU				7,124	N/A	N/A
Association of Building Technicians	ABT	1941	Merged into ASW	1970	N/A	3,302	N/A
Coopers' Federation of Great Britain	CFGB		Merged into NUGMW	1979	N/A	3,623	N/A
Furniture, Timber and Allied Trades Union	FTAT	1971	Merged into GMB	1993	N/A	N/A	85,036
General Union of Bedding Trade Workers		1936			N/A	N/A	N/A
General Union Carpenters and Joiners	GUC&J		Merged into ASW	1921	N/A	N/A	N/A
Manchester Unity of Operative Bricklayers Society	MUOBS		Merged into AUBTW	1921	N/A	N/A	N/A
Mutual Association of Journeymen Coopers of Great Britain and Ireland					4,250	N/A	N/A
National Amalgamated Furnishing Trades Association	NAFTA		Merged into NUFTO		32,000	N/A	N/A
National Association of Coopers					1,600	N/A	N/A
National Association of Operative Plasterers	NAOP	1924	Merged into TGWU	1968	N/A	16,987	N/A
National Builders' Labourers and Constructional Workers' Society	NBLCWS		Merged into AUBTW	1952	45,000	11,000	N/A
National Society of Street Masons, Paviors and Road Makers			Merged into AUBTW	1966	4,176	1,500	N/A
National Union of Basket, Cane, Wicker and Fibre Furniture Makers		1948	Dissolved	1973	N/A	515	N/A
National Union of Funeral Service Operatives	NUFSO	1927	Merged into FTAT	1978	N/A	1,259	N/A
National Union of Furniture Trade Operatives	NUFTO		Merged into FTAT	1971	N/A	71,276	N/A
National Union of Packing Case Makers (Wood and Tin), Box Makers, Sawyers and Mill Workers			Merged into ASW	1965		5,404	N/A
Operative Bricklayers' Society	OBS		Merged into AUBTW	1921	N/A	N/A	N/A
Operative Society of Masons, Quarrymen and Allied Trades of England and Wales			Merged into AUBTW	1921	N/A	N/A	N/A
Plumbing Trades Union	PTU		Merged into EETPU	1968	24,000	34,183	N/A
Public Works and Constructional Operatives' Union			Dissolved		6,000	N/A	N/A
Scottish Painters' Society			Merged into ASPD	1962	7,000	13,230	N/A
Sign and Display Trade Union	SDTU	1928	Merged into NATSOPA	1972	N/A	2,343	N/A
Union of Construction, Allied Trades and Technicians	UCATT	1971	Merged into Unite	2017	N/A	N/A	247,777
United French Polishers' Society			Merged into NUFTO	1969	1,400	1,522	N/A

=== Printing and Paper ===
Of the unions which held membership of this section, the National Union of Journalists remains a TUC member.

Name	Acronym	Joined	Reason not affiliated	Year left	Affiliated membership (1921)	Affiliated membership (1950)	Affiliated membership (1980)
Amalgamated Association of Pressmen						N/A	N/A
Amalgamated Society of Lithographic Printers	ASLP		Merged into NGA	1969	5,374	7,734	N/A
Amalgamated Society of Paper Makers	ASPM		Merged into NUPBPW	1937	3,000	N/A	N/A
Association of Correctors of the Press	ACP		Merged into NGA	1965	1,366	1,482	N/A
Graphical, Paper and Media Union	GPMU	1991	Merged into Amicus	c. 2005	N/A	N/A	N/A
London Typographical Society	LTS		Merged into NGA	1964	15,200	13,574	N/A
Monotype Casters' and Typefounders' Society			Merged into NUPBPW	1962	N/A	854	N/A
National Graphical Association	NGA	1964	Merged into GPMU	1991	N/A	N/A	111,541
National Society of Electrotypers and Stereotypers	NSES		Merged into NGA	1967	3,000	4,241	N/A
National Society of Operative Printers and Media Personnel	NATSOPA		Merged into SOGAT	1982	19,955	33,157	54,464
National Union of Bookbinders and Machine Rulers			Merged into NUPBPW	1921	N/A	N/A	N/A
National Union of Press Telegraphists	NUPT		Merged into NGA	1965	N/A	1,326	N/A
National Union of Printing and Paper Workers			Merged into NUPBPW	1921	N/A	N/A	N/A
National Union of Printing, Bookbinding and Paper Workers	NUPBPW	1921	Merged into SOGAT	1966	100,000	119,788	N/A
National Union of Wallcoverings, Decorative and Allied Trades	NUWDAT		Merged into NGA	1979	2,000	2,500	N/A
Printing Machine Managers' Trade Society	PMMTS				4,500	4,917	N/A
Scottish Typographical Association			Merged into SOGAT	1974	5,721	N/A	N/A
Society of Graphical and Allied Trades	SOGAT	1966	Merged into GPMU	1991	N/A	N/A	205,784
Society of Lithographic Artists, Designers and Engravers	SLADE		Merged into NGA	1982	4,900	10,342	24,921
Society of Women Employed in the Printing and Bookbinding Trades		1942	Merged into NUPBPW	1943	N/A	N/A	N/A
Typographical Association	TA		Merged into NGA	1964	31,234	46,132	N/A

=== Textiles ===
Name	Acronym	Joined	Reason not affiliated	Year left	Affiliated membership (1921)	Affiliated membership (1950)	Affiliated membership (1980)
Amalgamated Association of Beamers, Twisters and Drawers (Hand and Machine)	AABTD		Disaffiliated	1992	6,401	3,677	1,065
Amalgamated Association of Operative Cotton Spinners	AAOCS		Representation transferred to ATWU	1974	55,285	21,423	N/A
Amalgamated Society of Dyers, Finishers and Kindred Trades					38,500	N/A	N/A
Amalgamated Society of Operative Lace Makers and Auxiliary Workers	ASOLMAW		Merged into NUHKW	1971	2,257	1,150	N/A
Amalgamated Society of Stuff and Woollen Warehousemen					3,000	N/A	N/A
Amalgamated Textile Warehouse Operatives Association			Representation transferred to ATWU	1976	4,000	6,030	N/A
Amalgamated Textile Workers Union	ATWU	1974	Merged into GMB	1986	N/A	N/A	35,710
Amalgamated Weavers' Association	AWA		Merged into ATWU	1974	223,119	75,379	N/A
British Lace Operatives' Federation					N/A	1,200	N/A
Bradford and District Warpdressers' Association			Merged into YSTC	1951		254	N/A
Card Setting Machine Tenters Society	CSMTS	1950	Dissolved	2008	N/A	278	130
Cloth Pressers' Society			Dissolved	1984	401	160	30
General Union of Loom Overlookers	GULO		Dissolved	2007	8,900	5,300	2,410
General Union of Textile Workers	GUTW		Merged into NUTW	1922	81,400	N/A	N/A
Halifax and District Warpdressers' Association			Merged into YSTC	c. 1951			N/A
Haslingden and Rossendale Tape Sizers' Society					N/A	72	N/A
Hinckley and District Hosiery Union		1935			N/A	N/A	N/A
Huddersfield and District Healders and Twisters Trade and Friendly Society		1943	Merged into NUDBTW	1980	N/A	318	174
Huddersfield and District Worsted and Woollen Warpers' Association		1947	Merged into YSTC	1951	N/A	306	N/A
Ilkeston and District Hosiery Union					7,500	N/A	N/A
India Rubber, Cable and Asbestos Workers' Society					6,000	N/A	N/A
Lancashire Amalgamated Tape Sizers' Society					110	N/A	N/A
Leeds and District Warp Dressers', Twisters' and Kindred Trades Association			Merged into YSTC	1975	N/A	N/A	N/A
Leicester and Leicestershire Amalgamated Hosiery Union					N/A	N/A	N/A
Managers' and Overlookers' Society	M&O		Merged into ASTMS	1977	3,577	1,964	N/A
National Silk Workers' and Textile Trades' Association		1940	Merged into ASTWKT	1965	N/A	2,510	N/A
National Society of Dyers and Finishers			Merged into NUTW	1922	15,480	N/A	N/A
National Society of Woolcombers and Kindred Trades					8,430	N/A	N/A
National Union of Dyers, Bleachers and Textile Workers	NUDBTW	1936	Merged into TGWU	1982	N/A	79,550	56,843
National Union of Textile and Allied Workers	NUTAW	1929	Merged into ATWU	1974	80,576	50,508	N/A
National Union of Textile Workers	NUTW	1922	Merged into NUDBTW	1936	N/A	N/A	N/A
National Wool Sorters Society			Merged into APEX	1980	1,000	2,143	N/A
Nelson and District Preparatory Workers' Association		1941	Disaffiliated	1955	N/A	1,133	N/A
Northern Carpet Trades Union	NCTU	1959	Merged into TGWU	c. 2000	N/A	N/A	2,065
Nottingham and District Hosiery Workers' Society					N/A	N/A	N/A
Operative Bleachers, Dyers and Finishers Association					28,571	N/A	N/A
Pattern Weavers' Society		1968	Disaffiliated	1989	N/A	N/A	100
Power Loom Carpet Weavers and Textile Workers Union	PLCWTWU		Merged into ISTC	c. 2000	5,064	4,000	6,023
Print Block, Roller and Stamp Cutters' Society		1945	Merged into NUWDAT	1969	N/A	403	N/A
Saddleworth and District Weavers and Woollen Textile Workers' Association		1927	Merged into NUDBTW	1973	N/A	2,306	N/A
Scottish Union of Power Loom Overlookers	SUPLO	1947	Dissolved	2000	N/A	500	200
Textile Daymen's and Cloth Pattern Makers' Association		1947	Merged into YSTC	1967	N/A	130	N/A
Trade Society of Machine Calico Printers		1944	Disaffiliated	1972	N/A	700	N/A
Union of Jute, Flax and Kindred Textile Operatives			Merged into NUDBTW	1979	14,000	3,225	N/A
Union of Textile Workers	UTW	1939	Merged into Amicus	2002–2003	N/A	7,408	6,006
United Society of Engravers		1925	Merged into SLADE	1973	N/A	1,493	N/A
Warpdressers, Twisters, and Kindred Traders Association					N/A	152	N/A
Wool, Yarn and Warehouse Workers' Union		1942	Merged into NUGMW	1968	N/A	700	N/A
Yeadon, Guiseley and District Factory Workers' Union			Merged into NUTW	1922	2,880	N/A	N/A
Yorkshire Association of Power Loom Overlookers	YAPLO		Merged into TGWU	1993	2,300	1,656	1,130
Yorkshire Society of Textile Craftsmen	YSTC	1979	Merged into NUDBTW	1980	N/A	N/A	N/A
Yorkshire Warptwisters' Society			Merged into YSTC	1951	N/A	858	N/A

=== Clothing, Leather and Boot and Shoe ===
Name	Acronym	Joined	Reason not affiliated	Year left	Affiliated membership (1921)	Affiliated membership (1950)	Affiliated membership (1980)
Amalgamated Felt Hat Trimmers, Wool Formers and Allied Workers	AFHTW&AWF		Merged into NUTGW	1982	2,345	2,599	627
Amalgamated Society of Boot and Shoe Makers and Repairers	AABS		Merged into USDAW	1955	2,000	1,190	N/A
Amalgamated Society of Journeymen Cloggers					N/A	N/A	N/A
Amalgamated Society of Journeymen, Felt Hatters and Allied Workers	ASJFH		Merged into NUTGW	1982	3,964	3,025	526
Amalgamated Society of Leather Workers			Merged into NUFLAT	1971	6,000	12,102	N/A
Amalgamated Society of Tailors and Tailoresses	AST&T				35,208	N/A	N/A
Leicester and Leicestershire Amalgamated Hosiery Union					7,000	N/A	N/A
Leicester and Leicestershire Hosiery Trimmers' Association		1956	Merged into NUHKW	1970	N/A	N/A	N/A
London Saddle and Harness Makers' Trade Protection Society					450	N/A	N/A
Midland Counties Hosiery Finishers' Federation					4,000	N/A	N/A
Midland Leather Trades Federation					400	N/A	N/A
National Union of Boot and Shoe Operatives	NUBSO		Merged into NUFLAT	1971	85,457	70,503	N/A
National Union of Footwear, Leather and Allied Trades	NUFLAT	1971	Merged into KFAT	1991	N/A	N/A	64,744
National Union of Glovers and Leather Workers	NUGLW	1937	Merged into NUFLAT	1971	N/A	2,028	N/A
National Union of Hosiery and Knitwear Workers	NUHKW	1945	Merged into KFAT	1990	N/A	36,976	70,484
National Union of Knitwear, Footwear and Apparel Trades	KFAT	1990	Merged into Community	c. 2004	N/A	N/A	N/A
National Union of Leather Workers and Allied Trades	NULWAT		Merged into NUFLAT	1971	N/A	3,621	N/A
National Union of Tailors and Garment Workers	NUTGW	1932	Merged into GMB	1991	N/A	134,935	117,362
Nottingham and District Hosiery Finishers' Association	NHFA	1955	Merged into NUHKW	1969	N/A	N/A	N/A
Rossendale Union of Boot, Shoe and Slipper Operatives	RUBSSO		Merged into KFAT	1997	4,848	6,417	5,818
Tailors' and Garment Workers' Trade Union					92,736	N/A	N/A
United Rotary Power Framework Knitters' Society					6,000	N/A	N/A
Union of Saddlers and General Leather Workers					2,000	N/A	N/A
Waterproof Garment Workers' Trade Union			Merged into NUTGW	1972	1,815	3,100	N/A

=== Glass, Ceramics, Chemicals, Food, Drink, Tobacco, Brushmaking and Distribution ===
Of the unions in this section, the Bakers, Food and Allied Workers' Union and the Union of Shop, Distributive and Allied Workers remain TUC members.

Name	Acronym	Joined	Reason not affiliated	Year left	Affiliated membership (1921)	Affiliated membership (1950)	Affiliated membership (1980)
Chemical Workers' Union	CWU	1944	Merged into TGWU	1971	N/A	20,973	N/A
Cigarette Machine Operators' Society	CMOS		Dissolved	1988	400	610	351
Diageo Staff Association			Dissolved	2010	N/A	N/A	N/A
Federation of Salt Workers, Alkali Workers, Mechanics and General Labourers					3,840	N/A	N/A
Glasgow Glass Bottle Makers' Trade Protection Society					600	N/A	N/A
Journeymen Butchers' Federation of Great Britain					8,000	N/A	N/A
Lancashire Glass Bottle Makers' Association					480	N/A	N/A
London Glass Workers' Trade Society			Dissolved	1968	960	495	N/A
London Jewish Bakers' Union	LJBU		Dissolved	1969	120	108	N/A
Midland Glass Bevellers' and Kindred Trades' Society		1930	Merged into NUFTO	1970	N/A	420	N/A
National Amalgamated Union of Shop Assistants, Warehousemen and Clerks	NAUSAWC		Merged into USDAW		60,000	N/A	N/A
National Association of Co-operative Officials	NACO		Merged into USDAW	2018	3,000	7,314	6,099
National Association of Licensed House Managers	NALHM		Merged into TGWU	1997	N/A	N/A	16,422
National Cigar and Tobacco Workers' Union			Merged into TWU	1946	4,006	N/A	N/A
National Glass Workers' Trade Protection Association						N/A	N/A
National League of the Blind and Disabled	NLBD		Merged into ISTC	c. 2000	5,000	6,665	4,250
National Society of Brushmakers and General Workers			Merged into FTAT	1983	4,940	5,100	1,505
National Union of Commercial Travellers		1924	Dissolved	1970	N/A	475	N/A
National Union of Distributive and Allied Workers	NUDAW		Merged into USDAW		130,000	N/A	N/A
Retail Book, Stationery and Allied Trades Employees' Association	RBA	1926	Expelled	1973	N/A	3,172	N/A
Scottish Union of Bakers and Allied Workers	SUBAW	1926	Merged into USDAW	1978	N/A	15,054	N/A
Tobacco Workers' Union	TWU		Merged into AUEW-TASS	1986	750	22,864	20,630
Unity	Unity		Merged into GMB	2015	38,700	26,376	42,000

=== Agriculture ===
Name	Acronym	Joined	Reason not affiliated	Year left	Affiliated membership (1921)	Affiliated membership (1950)	Affiliated membership (1980)
National Union of Agricultural and Allied Workers	NUAAW		Merged into TGWU	1982	130,000	135,000	85,000

=== Public Employees ===
Of the former members of this section, the Educational Institute of Scotland, Fire Brigades Union, Hospital Consultants and Specialists Association and NASUWT remain TUC members.

Name	Acronym	Joined	Reason not affiliated	Year left	Affiliated membership (1921)	Affiliated membership (1950)	Affiliated membership (1980)
Aspect	Aspect		Merged into Prospect	2012	N/A	N/A	N/A
Association for College Management	ACM		Merged into ATL	2011	N/A	N/A	N/A
Association of Teachers and Lecturers	ATL		Merged into NEU	2017	N/A	N/A	N/A
Association of University Teachers	AUT		Merged into UCU	c. 2006	N/A	N/A	30,880
Civil Service Sorting Assistants' Association					800	N/A	N/A
Community and District Nursing Association	CDNA		Merged into GMB	2010	N/A	N/A	N/A
Confederation of Health Service Employees	COHSE		Merged into Unison	1993	N/A	52,152	212,885
Greater London Staff Association	GLSA	1956	Merged into GMB	1988	N/A	N/A	17,089
Health Visitors' Association	HVA	1924	Merged into MSF	1990	N/A	3,029	12,115
Hospital and Welfare Services Union	HWSU	1935			N/A	N/A	N/A
Managerial and Professional Officers	MPO		Merged into GMB	2000	N/A	N/A	N/A
Medical Practitioners' Union	MPU	1935	Merged into ASTMS	1970	N/A		N/A
Mental Hospital and Institutional Workers' Union	MHIWU					N/A	N/A
Municipal Employees' Association	MEA				65,000	N/A	N/A
National Association of Schoolmasters	NAS	1969	Merged into NASUWT	1976	N/A	N/A	N/A
National Association of Teachers in Further and Higher Education	NATFHE	1967	Merged into UCU	c. 2006	N/A	N/A	64,786
National and Local Government Officers Association	NALGO	1965	Merged into Unison	1993	N/A	N/A	753,226
National Union of Police and Prison Officers					2,500	N/A	N/A
National Union of Public Employees	NUPE		Merged into Unison	1993	N/A	165,250	691,770
National Union of School Teachers					14,082	N/A	N/A
National Union of Teachers	NUT	1970	Merged into NEU	2017	N/A	N/A	248,896
National Union of Water Works Employees	NUWWE	1964	Merged into GMWU	1972	N/A	N/A	N/A

=== Civil Servants and Post Office ===
Of the unions in this section, the FDA and POA remain TUC members.

Name	Acronym	Joined	Reason not affiliated	Year left	Affiliated membership (1921)	Affiliated membership (1950)	Affiliated membership (1980)
Association of Civil Service Designers and Draughtsmen		1946	Merged into STCS	1949	N/A	N/A	N/A
Association of Government Supervisors and Radio Officers	AGSRO	1969	Merged into IPCS	1984	N/A	N/A	12,026
Association of Magisterial Officers	AMO		Merged into PCS	c. 2005	N/A	N/A	N/A
Association of Tax Clerks					N/A	N/A	N/A
Civil and Public Services Association	CPSA	1946	Merged into PCS	1998	N/A	144,681	223,884
Civil Service Union	CSU	1946	Merged into NUCPS	1987	N/A	22,974	46,928
Communication Managers' Association	CMA		Merged into MSF	1998	4,088	N/A	18,500
Connect	Connect	1969	Merged into Prospect	2010	N/A	N/A	22,567
Court Officers' Association		1967	Merged into CPSA	1974	N/A	N/A	N/A
Customs and Excise Federation		1964	Merged into CEG	1972	N/A	N/A	N/A
Customs and Excise Group			Merged into SCPS	1975	N/A	N/A	N/A
Customs and Excise Preventive Staff Association	PSA	1966	Merged into CEG	1972	N/A	N/A	N/A
Inland Revenue Staff Federation	IRSF	1946	Merged into PTC	1996	N/A	34,490	65,257
Institution of Professionals, Managers and Specialists	IPMS	1976	Merged into Prospect	c. 2001	N/A	N/A	102,142
Ministry of Labour Staff Association	MLSA		Merged into CPSA	1973	N/A	13,155	N/A
National Communications Union	NCU	1985	Merged into CWU	1995	N/A	N/A	N/A
National Union of Civil and Public Servants	NUCPS		Merged into PTC	1996	N/A	N/A	N/A
Post Office Engineering Union	POEU	1946	Merged into NCU	1985	20,005	50,410	125,723
Public Services, Tax and Commerce Union	PTC		Merged into PCS	1998	N/A	N/A	N/A
Scottish Prison Officers' Association	SPOA	1980	Merged into POA	c. 2000	N/A	N/A	2,567
Society of Civil and Public Servants	SCPS		Merged into NUCPS	1987	N/A	N/A	108,697
Society of Technical Civil Servants	STCS	1949	Merged into IPCS	1971	N/A	6,653	N/A
Society of Telecommunication Engineers		1966	Merged into APOE	1969	N/A	N/A	N/A
Telephone Contract Officers' Association	TCOA				N/A	N/A	N/A
Union of Communication Workers	UCW		Merged into CWU	1995	80,000	147,001	203,452

=== Professional, Clerical and Entertainment ===
Of the unions in this section, Equity, Musicians' Union and Writers' Guild of Great Britain remain TUC affiliates.

Name	Acronym	Joined	Reason not affiliated	Year left	Affiliated membership (1921)	Affiliated membership (1950)	Affiliated membership (1980)
Actors' Association					3,075	N/A	N/A
Alliance and Leicester Group Union of Staff	ALGSU		Merged into CWU	2007	N/A	N/A	N/A
Association of Broadcasting and Allied Staffs	ABS	1963	Merged into BETA	1984	N/A	N/A	15,274
Association of Cinematograph Television and Allied Technicians	ACTT	1937	Merged into BECTU	1991	N/A	7,547	21,712
Association of Professional, Executive, Clerical and Computer Staff	APEX	1941	Merged into GMB	1989	N/A	34,907	151,206
Association of Scientific Workers	AScW	1942	Merged into ASTMS	1968	N/A	12,790	N/A
Association of Women Clerks and Secretaries		1919	Merged into APEX	1940	8,500	N/A	N/A
Banking, Insurance and Finance Union	BIFU		Merged into UNIFI	c. 1999	N/A	29,058	131,810
Bank Officers' Guild		1940			N/A	N/A	N/A
Barclays Group Staff Union	BGSU		Merged into UNIFI	1999	N/A	N/A	N/A
Britannia Staff Union	BSU		Merged into Unite	2018	N/A	N/A	N/A
Broadcasting and Entertainment Trades Alliance	BETA	1984	Merged into BECTU	1991	N/A	N/A	N/A
Broadcasting, Entertainment, Cinematograph and Theatre Union	BECTU	1991	Merged into Prospect	2017	N/A	N/A	N/A
Cheshire Group Staff Union	CGSU		Merged into OURS	2010	N/A	N/A	N/A
Derbyshire Group Staff Union	DGSU		Merged into OURS	2010	N/A	N/A	N/A
Engineer Surveyors' Association	ESA	1941	Merged into ASTMS	1975	N/A		N/A
Film Artistes' Association	FAA	1930	Merged into BECTU	1995	N/A	1,629	2,581
National Amalgamated Union of Life Assurance Workers	NAULAW		Merged into NUIW	1964	15,000	7,000	N/A
National Association of Theatrical Television and Kine Employees	NATTKE		Merged into BETA	1984	15,000	30,726	17,000
National Federation of Insurance Workers	NFIW		Merged into NUIW	1964	11,000	38,904	N/A
National Union of Clerks and Administrative Workers	NUCAW		Merged into APEX	1940	19,000	N/A	N/A
National Union of Insurance Workers	NUIW	1964	Merged into MSF	c. 2000	N/A	N/A	20,044
NatWest Staff Association	NWSA		Merged into UNIFI	c. 1999	N/A	N/A	N/A
One Union of Regional Staff	OURS	2010	Merged into NGSU	2011	N/A	N/A	N/A
Scottish Bankers' Association		1940			N/A	N/A	N/A
Skipton Union Representing Group Employees	SURGE		Merged into Aegis	2014	N/A	N/A	N/A
Staff Union Dunfermline Building Society	SUDBS		Merged into NGSU	2011	N/A	N/A	N/A
Staff Union West Bromwich Building Society	SUWBBS		Merged into Community	2018	N/A	N/A	N/A
UNIFI	UNIFI	1999	Merged into Amicus	c. 2004	N/A	N/A	N/A
Union for Bradford and Bingley Staff and Associated Companies	UBAC		Merged into Advance	2009	N/A	N/A	N/A
Union for Woolwich Staff	UWS		Merged into UNIFI	c. 2002	N/A	N/A	N/A
Union of Insurance Staffs	UIS	1937	Merged into ASTMS	1970	N/A	16,537	N/A
Variety Artists' Federation	VAF		Merged into Equity	1967	6,000	N/A	N/A
Yorkshire Independent Staff Association	YISA		Merged into Aegis	2014	N/A	N/A	N/A

=== General Workers ===
Of the unions in this section, the GMB remains a TUC affiliate.

Name	Acronym	Joined	Reason not affiliated	Year left	Affiliated membership (1921)	Affiliated membership (1950)	Affiliated membership (1980)
Amalgamated Society of Gas Workers, Brickmakers and General Labourers	ASGWBM&GL		Merged into NUGW	1921	N/A	N/A	N/A
Federation of Trade Unions of Salt Workers, Alkali Workers, Mechanics and General Labourers		1935	Dissolved	1964	N/A	2,228	N/A
Labour Protection League					2,500	N/A	N/A
National Amalgamated Labourers' Union	NALU		Merged into TGWU	1921	N/A	N/A	N/A
National Amalgamated Union of Labour	NAUL		Merged into NUGMW		142,914	N/A	N/A
National Federation of Women Workers	NFWW		Merged into TUC	1921	N/A	N/A	N/A
National Union of General Workers	NUGW				490,146	N/A	N/A
National Laundry Workers' Union					1,120	N/A	N/A
National Union of Corporation Workers	NUCW				16,000	N/A	N/A
National Union of Millers			Merged into DWRGLU	1920	N/A	N/A	N/A
National Union of Warehouse and General Workers			Merged into NUDAW	1921	N/A	N/A	N/A
Northern United Enginemen's Association			Merged into NUEFMEW	1921	N/A	N/A	N/A
Process and General Workers' Union		1942	Merged into TGWU	1969	N/A	2,114	N/A
Union of Salt, Chemical and Industrial General Workers			Merged into NUGMW	1969	N/A	N/A	N/A
United Order of General Labourers	UOGL				15,000	N/A	N/A
United Rubber Workers of Great Britain		1940	Merged into NUGMW	1974	N/A	3,000	N/A
Workers' Union					450,000	N/A	N/A

=== Other unions ===
Name	Acronym	Joined	Group (Note: Affiliated unions were placed in an industrial group until 1983. Group information is from Eaton & Gill (1981) for all unions affiliated as of 1981. For unions which left before this date, information is from the last relevant annual report of the TUC.)	Reason not affiliated	Year left
Community and Youth Workers' Union	CYWU		N/A	Merged into TGWU	c. 2006

== See also ==
- List of trade unions in the United Kingdom
