= Labour Party (UK) affiliated trade union =

Trade union linked with the British Labour Party

In British politics, an affiliated trade union is one that is linked to the Labour Party. The party was created by the trade unions and socialist societies in 1900 as the Labour Representation Committee and the unions have retained close institutional links with it.

Affiliated unions pay an annual fee to the Labour Party; in return, they elect thirteen of the thirty-nine members of Labour's National Executive Committee and fifty per cent of the delegates to Labour Party Conference. Local union branches also affiliate to Constituency Labour Parties and their members who are also individual members of the Party may represent the union as delegates on Labour Party structures.

Individual members may opt out of paying into a union's political fund which is used to finance the affiliation.

Since 1994, affiliated trade unions have organised themselves into the Trade Union and Labour Party Liaison Organisation (TULO), with a small number of staff to manage the relationship between the unions and the Party. A national TULO committee, with the unions' general secretaries, the Party Leader and Deputy Leader, General Secretary and NEC Chair and MPs' representatives, meets regularly to co-ordinate work and policy.

Until 1995, each union exercised a block vote at party conferences; since then, multiple delegates of a single union get an equal share of its voting allocation.

== Affiliated unions ==
As of October 2021, the trade unions affiliated to the Labour Party are:

- Associated Society of Locomotive Engineers and Firemen (ASLEF)
- Community (formerly KFAT & ISTC)
- Communication Workers Union (CWU)
- Fire Brigades Union (FBU)
- GMB
- Musicians Union (MU)
- National Union of Mineworkers (NUM)
- Transport Salaried Staffs' Association (TSSA)
- UNISON (The Public Services Union)
- Unite (general workers in public and private sectors)
- Union of Shop, Distributive and Allied Workers (USDAW)

The General Federation of Trade Unions (GFTU) represents its members, seven of the smaller unions, on many of the committees if they cannot send a delegate. In 2015, Unity merged into the GMB. In January 2017, the Broadcasting, Entertainment, Cinematograph and Theatre Union (BECTU) merged with Prospect, a trade union that represents certain grades in the civil service and other professionals. Because Prospect represents civil servants, they are politically neutral and so BECTU disaffiliated from the Labour Party as a condition of the merger. In January 2017, the Union of Construction, Allied Trades and Technicians (UCATT) merged into Unite.

== Former affiliates ==
During Tony Blair's leadership of the Labour Party, the National Union of Rail, Maritime and Transport Workers and Fire Brigades Union severed their links. However, the Fire Brigades Union re-affiliated to the Labour Party in November 2015. In September 2021 the Bakers, Food and Allied Workers' Union, one of the founding unions of the party, announced its disaffiliation from the party, citing dissatisfaction with Keir Starmer's leadership.

Formerly, there were many more small trade unions in the UK, and many of them affiliated to the Labour Party. In 1946, the affiliates were:

- Amalgamated Engineering Union
- Amalgamated Society of Journeymen Felt Hatters
- Amalgamated Society of Shuttlemakers
- Amalgamated Society of Textile Workers and Kindred Trades
- Amalgamated Union of Building Trade Workers of Great Britain and Ireland
- Amalgamated Union of Operative Bakers, Confectioners and Allied Workers
- Amalgamated Union of Upholsterers
- Associated Blacksmiths', Forge and Smithy Workers' Society
- Associated Society of Locomotive Engineers and Firemen
- Association of Cine-Technicians
- Association of Correctors of the Press
- Association of Engineering and Shipbuilding Draughtsmen
- Boilermakers' and Iron and Steel Shipbuilders' Society
- Cardiff, Penarth and Barry Coal Trimmers' Union
- Confederation of Health Service Employees
- Constructional Engineering Union
- Clerical and Administrative Workers' Union
- Electrical Trades Union
- Enginemen and Firemen's Union
- Fire Brigades' Union
- General Iron Fitters' Association
- Iron and Steel Trades Confederation
- Ironfounding Workers' Association
- London Society of Compositors
- National Amalgamated Furnishing Trades' Association
- National Amalgamated Union of Life Assurance Workers
- National Amalgamated Union of Shop Assistants, Warehousemen and Clerks
- National Association of Operative Plasterers
- National Cutlery Union
- National League of the Blind
- National Society of Coppersmiths, Braziers and Metal Workers
- National Society of Metal Mechanics
- National Society of Operative Printers and Assistants
- National Society of Painters
- National Society of Pottery Workers
- National Union of Agricultural Workers
- National Union of Blastfurnacemen, Ore Miners, Coke Workers and Kindred Trades
- National Union of Boot and Shoe Operatives
- National Union of Cigarette Makers and Tobacco Workers
- National Union of Distributive and Allied Workers
- National Union of Dyers, Bleachers and Textile Workers
- National Union of Electrotypers and Stereotypers
- National Union of Foundry Workers
- National Union of General and Municipal Workers
- National Union of Gold, Silver and Allied Trades
- National Union of Mineworkers
- National Union of Public Employees
- National Union of Railwaymen
- National Union of Seamen
- National Union of Shale Miners and Oil Workers
- National Union of Stove, Grate, and General Metal Workers
- National Union of Tailors and Garment Workers
- National Union of Vehicle Builders
- National Woolsorters' Society
- Power Loom Carpet Weavers' and Textile Workers' Association
- Prudential Staff Union
- Railway Clerks' Association
- Scottish Painters' Society
- Scottish Union of Bakers and Confectioners
- Ship Constructors' and Shipwrights' Association
- Society of Lithographic Artists, Designers, Engravers and Process Workers
- Transport and General Workers' Union
- Typographical Association
- United French Polishers' Society
- United Patternmakers' Association
- United Textile Factory Workers' Association
- Waterproof Garment Workers' Trade Union
- Yorkshire Warptwisters' Society

== See also ==
- Trades Union Congress
- Political funding in the United Kingdom
- Trade Union and Labour Party Liaison Organisation
- Socialist society (Labour Party)
