= Tom Eccles =

British trade unionist

Tom Eccles (5 October 1893 – 3 February 1962) was a British trade unionist.

Eccles was born in Blackburn in 1893. In 1912, he joined the National Union of General Workers in 1912, a union in which his father, Fleming Eccles, was prominent.

Eccles fought in World War I, but was seriously injured and spent a lengthy period as a prisoner of war. On repatriation to the UK, he again became active in the union, which later became part of the National Union of General and Municipal Workers (NUGMW), serving as a district organiser, then as the Lancashire district secretary. He was also active in the Labour Party, and served on Stockport Borough Council.

Within the union, Eccles was known for his skill in negotiations, and he served on a number of national negotiating bodies. He was also the NUGMW representative on both the Confederation of Shipbuilding and Engineering Unions and the National Federation of Building Trades Operatives. He served on the General Council of the Trades Union Congress (TUC) from 1949 to 1959, and was the TUC's representative to the American Federation of Labour in 1955. He served on the TUC's North West Advisory Committee until 1958, when he resigned, unhappy that it did not support his boycott of the North West Regional Board for Industry.

Eccles' son, Jack, followed him in becoming a prominent trade unionist and Labour councillor.

Trade union offices
Preceded by Arthur Seabury	Lancashire District Secretary of the National Union of General and Municipal Workers; 1943–1958	Succeeded by Bernard Swindell
Preceded by Jim Baty and Jock Tiffin	Trades Union Congress representative to the AFL–CIO; 1955; With: Jim Campbell	Succeeded by Wilfred Blackwell Beard and Joseph O'Hagan
