= National Association of Coopers =

The National Association of Coopers was a trade union representing coopers in the United Kingdom, principally in London.

The union was founded in 1821 as the London Philanthropic Society of Coopers, to represent coopers working at breweries. It soon became the largest union of coopers in London, and by 1850 had 460 members. It grew further, reaching 850 members by 1860, but became moribund. In 1894, it was re-established as the United Society of Coopers (London), with 700 members. Membership remained small, generally between 400 and 500, but it affiliated to the Labour Party and co-sponsored Will Crooks' candidacy in both 1910 general elections, and again in 1918.

The union affiliated to the Mutual Association of Journeymen Coopers, but left in about 1914, becoming the London Coopers' Association. In 1919, it became the National Association of Coopers, hoping to expand and rival the Mutual Association, but in 1926 the two unions agreed to work together to form the Coopers' Federation of Great Britain. George William Harrison, secretary of the union, became the first secretary of the federation, but he was removed from office a year later due to embezzling money collected to support the 1926 UK miners' strike.

In 1947, the union merged with the Leith, Edinburgh and District Society of Coopers, to form the National Trade Union of Coopers, which retained membership of the federation.

== General Secretaries ==
1910s: George William Harrison
1927: J. S. Wilkie
