= Warwick Agreement =

The Warwick Agreement is the name of a document agreed in July 2004 to the 2005 General Election between many of Britain's main trade unions and the Labour Party, which helped form Labour's 2005 election manifesto.

The affiliated trade unions are organised into a group called TULO (Trade Union & Labour Party Liaison Organisation).

The document is named after The University of Warwick, where the agreement was made.

== Future developments ==
In September 2006, Amicus assistant general secretary Tony Burke slammed the government at the Trades Union Congress over its failure to implement equal employment rights to agency and temporary workers, with the government blaming its lack of progress on a failure to secure an agreement on an EU directive which would have formed the framework of the legislation.

There is a small sector that believes a new, more relevant version of the Warwick Agreement is required to clamp down on some aspects of public services. John McDonnell MP is one of this group, quoted as saying: “Central to this Warwick Mark II programme should be the end of privatisation, the promotion of public ownership and public services, and the implementation of the Trade Union Freedom Bill.” Another prominent character in this is Jon Cruddas MP, who puts a lot of emphasis on policy change and improving Trade Union rights.

== Policy commitments ==
The policy proposals included in the Warwick One agreement are as follows:

Fairness at work

- Four weeks paid holiday for all, exclusive of bank holidays.
- Legislation on corporate manslaughter in the next parliamentary term.
- Using Anti-Social Behaviour Orders to tackle violence and anti-social behaviour in and around front-line workplaces.
- Major rollout of childcare schemes including Sure Start & Extended Childcare Scheme for lone parents.
- Increased statutory redundancy pay.
- To work in Europe for the introduction of employment protection for temporary and agency workers.
- Protection for striking workers to be extended from 8 to 12 weeks.
- New ‘Sectoral Forums’, for example in low wage industries to improve pay, skills, productivity and pensions.

Pensions

- Protection for pension funds in company transfers or mergers.
- Trade unions will gain the right to bargain on pensions.
- Training to be introduced for pension trustees, and members to make up 50% of trustees.
- Assistance for those who have already lost out on occupational pensions.
- An agreement to engage in effective dialogue over the future of public sector pensions.
- Legislation, if necessary, to move beyond the current voluntary system of occupational pensions.
- A commitment on pensions for same sex partners.

Public services

- The extension of two-tier workforce protection in local government across the public services.
- A review of all National Health Service cleaning contracts on a test of cleanliness and not just the cost.
- Consultation with all stakeholders to monitor PFI, including future financial implications.
- Steps to develop staff roles, e.g., health care assistants to receive paid training and possible registration.
- A commitment not to transfer out the vast majority of NHS employees.
- Agreement to tackle unequal pay in local government.
- Measures to promote healthy eating in schools and evaluate the possible extension of the free school meals programme.

Manufacturing

- Review and enhance investment funds for manufacturing support with a view to having the best support possible.
- Promote a public procurement which safeguards jobs and skills, encourages contracts to be given to UK firms for UK workers within EU law, and support a review of EU procurement policy.
- The Bank of England to consider regional and employment information when setting interest rates.
- A strong skills agenda, including
  - The expansion of apprenticeships
  - Rolling out Employer Training Pilots, supporting free training up to NVQ2
  - Action in sectors under-performing on skills, including possible training levies
  - Union Learning Representatives trebled to 22,000.
  - Investment in Research and Development to rise to 2.5% of national income.
- Improve credit export facilities.
  - Ensure Regional Development Agencies produce manufacturing strategies through working with employers and Trade Unions, and assist manufacturers to find new markets.

Other commitments

- The Royal Mail to stay in public hands, with telecom regulation to focus on service choice and reliability as well as network

competition.

- An immediate review of National Insurance Lower Earnings Limit to help lower paid workers get benefits.
- The New Deal to provide help to unemployed over 50's.
- Action to tackle unethical labour agencies in the health sector.
- Further action to tackle domestic violence and support those at risk.
- Legal limits to stop rip-off interest rates for credit.
- Stronger company disclosure on social, ethical, and environmental issues.

== Resources ==
- http://www.brc.org.uk/policycontent04.asp?iCat=42&iSubCat=406&sPolicy=Employment+%28UK%29&sSubPolicy=Warwick+Agreement
- http://www.gmb.org.uk/Templates/Internal.asp?NodeID=94362&int1stParentNodeID=89645&int2ndParentNodeID=89660
- http://www.amicustheunion.org/pdf/warwick%20agreement%20leaflet1.pdf
- http://www.tgwu.org.uk/shared_asp_files/GFSR.asp?NodeID=93339
- http://www.dti.gov.uk/files/file11436.pdf
