= Bernard Swindell =

British trade unionist

Bernard Hopkinson Swindell (27 March 1901 – 23 July 1968) was a British trade unionist, who served as chairman of the National Union of General and Municipal Workers (NUGMW).

Swindell was born in Tideswell, Derbyshire on 27 March 1901 as one of ten children. He left school at the age of thirteen to work in a cotton mill. He later moved to work in a quarry in Dove Holes, Derbyshire, and became active in the Amalgamated National Union of Quarryworkers and Settmakers. This became part of the National Union of General and Municipal Workers, and Swindell became first a shop steward, then served on district committees, and in 1958 became the union's Lancashire District Secretary.

In 1962, Swindell was elected as national chairman of the NUGMW. He was also elected to the General Council of the Trades Union Congress (TUC), and became chair of the TUC's Nursing Advisory Committee. He also served on the Industrial Training Council, various Joint Industrial Councils, and the Lancashire Regional Board for Industry and Industrial Development Association. He retired from his posts in 1966.

In his spare time, Swindell served as a magistrate, and on his local Rural District Council. He was also very interested in hospitals, serving on a regional board and as chair of his local hospital group.

Trade union offices
Preceded by Tom Eccles	Lancashire District Secretary of the National Union of General and Municipal Workers; 1958–1966	Succeeded by Jack Eccles
Preceded by Jack Cooper	Chairman of the National Union of General and Municipal Workers; 1962–1964	Succeeded by Charles Smith
