= Governor Mark =

Quality standard for School Governing Bodies in England

Governor Mark is a quality standard for School Governing Bodies in England. It was developed in 2006. The process of accreditation involves assessment against a detailed framework covering all aspects of the responsibilities of school governance. Achievement of the award has a validity of three years, after which reassessment will be required, and allows the school to display the GLM (governance, leadership and management) Governor Mark logo.
