= Thomas Hurley =

Thomas Hurley may refer to:

- Tom Hurley (trade unionist) (died 1933), British politician and trade union leader
- Thomas Hurley (ice hockey) (born 1944), American ice hockey player
- Tom Hurley, character in A Catered Affair
- Thomas Hurly of the Hurly baronets
- Tommy Hurley, see 2009 Toronto Rock season
