= National Governance Association =

UK organization for school governors

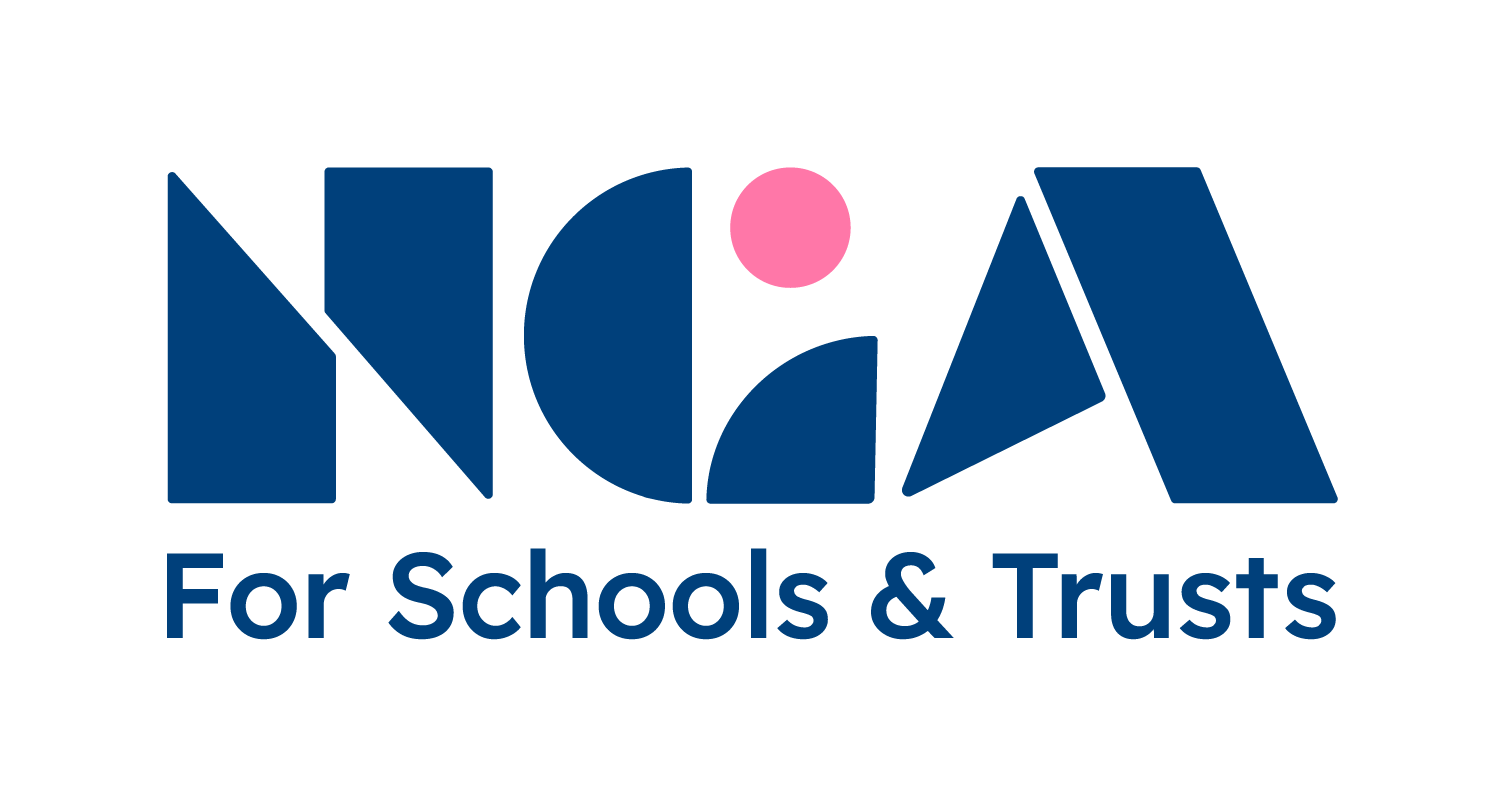
- Logo of the National Governance Association

- England in the UK and Europe
- Abbreviation: NGA
- Formation: February 2006; 20 years ago
- Merger of: National Governors' Council; National Association of School Governors
- Co-Chairs: Alastair Cowen & Lawayne Jefferson
- Chief Executive: Emma Balchin
- Website: http://www.nga.org.uk/
- Formerly called: National Governors' Association

The National Governance Association (NGA), founded as the National Governors' Association, is a representative body for school governors and trustees of state-funded schools in England. It was formed in February 2006 via the merger of two predecessor organisations: the National Governors’ Council (NGC) and the National Association of School Governors (NASG). It has its headquarters in Birmingham.

The National Governors' Council was founded in 1994, on the initiative of Jack Morrish.

== Purpose ==
The NGA works for school governors, trustees and clerks by:

- Representing and supporting governors, trustees and clerks in maintained schools and academies
- Providing information, advice, guidance, research and training
- Working closely with, and lobbying, UK government and educational bodies
- Supporting local governor associations and governing bodies
- Producing high quality guidance and information
- Organising regional events and national conferences

=== Membership ===
School governors, trustees and clerks can join the NGA as individuals or join up their governing boards as 'standard' or 'gold' members. Local authorities, education organisations and education businesses can support the work of the NGA as corporate members and local governor associations can also become members of NGA.

=== Services ===
GOLDline: NGA runs a confidential telephone advice line for its Gold members for legal and general advice

Training and Consultancy: the NGA offers a consultancy and training service which is open to all governing boards in England

=== Policies ===
The NGA promotes the work of governors and trustees at the national level. The NGA works closely with and lobbies government and the major educational bodies to ensure that the views of governors are fully represented in the national arena. In 2014 NGA produced a manifesto calling for:

1. School governance to be given greater prominence in central and local government policy making
2. Induction training to be provided free of charge for all new school governors and trustees
3. The government to provide financial incentives to encourage effective collaboration and to schools wishing to join together in LA Maintained federations as well as Multi Academy Trusts
4. School funding to be distributed fairly with three-year indicative budgets introduced for capital and revenue funding and for the level of school funding to be increased
5. The supply of high quality headteachers and teachers to be taken seriously and for the government to take action to prevent serious staffing shortages
6. The promotion of professional governing board clerks
7. A reduction in the number of new initiatives from central government and a period of relative stability to allow schools to continue to improve
8. More flexibility from employers to give their staff time off to govern

=== Local associations ===
Local Associations are volunteer local bodies; they are link between a school governing body and its local authority. A strong local association can make an enormous difference to governing body effectiveness. Some local associations have thousands of members, organise meetings and conferences and have their own websites. Others are small local groups. Many local authorities facilitate the formation of local governor associations, some go further and provide resources and clerking support. The NGA supports local associations with information, and acts as an information conduit to central government, to make sure the local voice is heard. The NGA can offer assistance to support a local association if problems arise with the local authority.

== Publications ==
Welcome to Governance: a guide for newly appointed school governors

The Chair's Handbook: a guide for chairs of governing boards

== See also ==
- School governor
