= MPO =

MPO may refer to:

== Science and technology ==
- Myeloperoxidase, a peroxidase enzyme most abundantly present in neutrophil granulocytes
- .mpo (Multi Picture Object file extension), a 3D computer graphics image file format
- Medial preoptic area, a portion of the preoptic area of the hypothalamus
- Multi-fiber Push-On, a type of optical fiber connector
- Multiset path ordering, a well-ordering in term rewriting (computer science)
- Matrix Product Operator, a type of tensor network central to the Density Matrix Renormalisation Group numerical technique

=== Astronomy ===
- Mercury Planetary Orbiter, the European Mercury orbiter flown with the BepiColombo spacecraft
- Minor Planet Circulars Orbit Supplement, an astronomical publication from the Minor Planet Center
- Minor Planet Observer, an astronomical computer program partially based on the work of Mikko Kaasalainen

== Organizations ==
- Macedonian Patriotic Organization, a United States and Canadian organization supporting Macedonians
- Metropolitan planning organization, a type of transportation policy-making organization in the United States
- Malaysian Philharmonic Orchestra, a Malaysian orchestra based in Kuala Lumpur
- Managerial and Professional Officers, former British trade union
- Management and Planning Organization of Iran, a now-dissolved organization previously responsible for Iran's budget
- Metropolitan Police Office, the government department responsible for the administration of the Metropolitan Police in London

== Other uses ==
- Metal Gear Solid: Portable Ops, a 2006 video game released for the PlayStation Portable
- Military Post Office, a key part of a military mail system
- Pocono Mountains Municipal Airport (IATA code), Pennsylvania, US
- Most Productive Overs method, in cricket
- Master of Prosthetics and Orthotics
- Marketing Performance Optimization, ForResult's comprehensive approach to your online marketing (SEO, GEO, and online advertising)
