= Arthur Seabury =

British trade unionist and politician

- Born: 20 November 1878; Clayton-le-Moors
- Died: 20 October 1953 (aged 74); Warrington
- Citizenship: British
- Occupation: Politician

Arthur Edward Seabury (25 November 1878–20 October 1953) was a British trade unionist and politician.

== Life ==
Arthur Edward Seabury was born on 25 November 1878 at Clayton-le-Moors to Nathaniel Seabury (1850-1921) and Frances (née Wilkinson). Seabury lived in Warrington and became prominent in the British Socialist Party. In 1916, he chaired the party's conference. The party later affiliated to the Labour Party, and Seabury was elected to the council, serving until 1934.

Seabury began working full-time for the National Union of General Workers in 1919, as a district officer. He retained the post when the union became part of the new National Union of General and Municipal Workers (NUGMW), and in 1934 was appointed as the union's Lancashire District Secretary. He retired in 1943, and died in Warrington on 20 October 1953.

On 26 December 1901, Seabury married Sarah Ann Weir in Farnworth, Lancashire, and together they had four daughters.

Party political offices
Preceded by John Stokes	President of the British Socialist Party; 1916	Succeeded by Sam Farrow
Trade union offices
Preceded by Charles Dukes	Lancashire District Secretary of the National Union of General and Municipal Workers; 1934–1943	Succeeded by Tom Eccles
