= William Pickles (trade unionist) =

British trade unionist and political activist

William Pickles (born October 1865) was a British trade unionist and political activist.

Born in Huddersfield, Pickles began working half-time in a woollen mill when he was eleven, and left school to work full-time two years later. He became a painter and decorator the following year, then in 1886 was a founder member of the National Amalgamated Society of Operative House Painters and Decorators.

In 1897, Pickles was elected as President of the Huddersfield Trades Council, serving until 1908. Although he never held high office in his own union, he was elected to the Parliamentary Committee of the Trades Union Congress, and served as President of the TUC in 1900.

At some point in the 1890s, Pickles also joined the Independent Labour Party (ILP). Through this, he became active in the Labour Representation Committee, for which he was elected to Huddersfield School Board in 1901, and then to the town council, representing Lindley, in 1904, serving for six years.

Pickles was a prominent supporter of T. Russell Williams in his contest for Huddersfield at the 1906 general election. He was one of four candidates shortlisted by the Labour Party for the 1907 Colne Valley by-election. Although he lost the nomination to Victor Grayson, Pickles subsequently became one of Grayson's leading supporters in his disputes with the ILP. He stood for Labour in Holmfirth at the January 1910 general election, but took only 14.9% of the vote.

Pickles remained active in the Labour Party, and stood again for it in Kingston upon Hull North West at the 1929 general election, taking second place with 30.1% of the vote. In 1931, he stood in Pudsey and Otley, taking only 24.0%. His final contest was his home town of Huddersfield at the 1935 general election, where he managed 39.2% of the votes cast.

Pickles retired from his union duties in 1944, aged 79.

Trade union offices
Preceded by W. J. Vernon	President of the Trades Union Congress; 1900	Succeeded by C. W. Bowerman
Party political offices
Preceded by Owen Connellan	Trades councils representative on the National Executive Committee of the Labour Representation Committee; 1902–1903	Succeeded by Ben Turner
