= National Union of Gold, Silver, and Allied Trades v Albury Brothers Ltd =

NUGSAT v Albury Brothers Ltd
- Court: Court of Appeal of England and Wales

Keywords
- Trade union, collective bargaining

National Union of Gold, Silver, and Allied Trades v Albury Brothers Ltd [1979] ICR 84 is a UK labour law case, concerning collective bargaining.

== Facts ==
Albury Brothers Ltd was a member of a British jewellers association which negotiated terms and conditions for workers across the industry. The National Union of Gold, Silver, and Allied Trades alleged that rates through the collective agreement were not being observed. Albury Brothers Ltd wanted to make some employees redundant. The employees it had selected had just become union members.

== Judgment ==
Lord Denning MR held that if a union had been recognised, even though Albury Brothers Ltd had never dealt with the union before, then it should have observed the statutory procedure for handling redundancies. If there was no recognised union, the employer is under no obligation. Recognition requires conduct that is ‘sufficiently clear and distinct’. Simply approaching a union official about a letter is not implicit indication of recognition, and merely mentioning collective bargaining issues in conversation is not enough. Negotiation is needed.

== See also ==
- UK labour law
