= Trade Union and Labour Party Liaison Organisation =

UK labour organisation

The Trade Union and Labour Party Liaison Organisation (TULO) also known as Labour Unions is a labour organisation in the United Kingdom that was set up in 1994 by a motion to the Labour Party's Annual Conference to coordinate trade union support for the Labour Party at elections and act as the channel of communication between the Party Leadership and its affiliated trade unions. It had several forerunning organisations that coordinated trade union support for the Labour Party at election times such as Trade Unions for a Labour Victory and Trade Unionists For Labour.

== History ==
Since 2002, TULO has taken a more visible role within the Labour Party, speaking up for pro-union policies. This work lead to the Warwick One Agreement, which formed part of Labour's 2005 manifesto, and the Warwick Two Agreement in 2008. It also led the campaigns to secure rights for Agency Workers (2007), increase statutory redundancy pay (2009), and to win compensation for sufferers of pleural plaques, a form of asbestosis (2010).

In 2010, it rebranded its campaigning activities as UnionsTogether, and led the way on large-scale union digital campaigning. Key campaigns have included advocating improved pensions rights for older female workers, exposing coalition attacks on working rights, the NHS Condition Critical Campaign, and the Jobs & Fair Pay campaign. It has placed a particular emphasis on exposing UKIP policies to cut workers rights such as maternity, paternity, and sick pay.

In 2019, TULO again rebranded as Labour Unions. Upon the rebranding Mick Whelan, chair of Labour Unions and ASLEF general secretary stated that through trade unions working together with the Labour Party they would meet the challenges of "a hugely unequal society, poverty pay, insecure work, struggling public services, unaffordable housing, the climate crisis and a radically and rapidly changing world of work".

TULO has been especially active on the issue of party funding, where it has sought to protect the engagement of trade unions in politics and to defend the role of the trade unions inside the Labour Party against the Conservative Party.

In May 2026, The Guardian reported that the affiliated trade unions were to call for Keir Starmer to set out a departure timetable to step down as Leader of the Labour Party and Prime Minister, coming after frustration about Starmer pulling out of a scheduled TULO meeting.

== National TULO Committee ==
There are 11 trade unions currently affiliated to the Labour Party at national level. On affiliation to the Labour Party every union automatically becomes a member of the National TULO and its General Secretary is entitled to sit on the National TULO Committee if they are an individual member of the Labour Party. The Committee is jointly chaired by a member from the union side, currently USDAW general secretary Joanne Thomas, since 2025 and the Labour Party Leader, Andy Burnham.

Between 2002 and 2016 the TULO National Officer was Byron Taylor, a former trade union officer and Labour leader on Basildon Council. Since 2016 the National Officer has been Helen Pearce, the former Head of Campaigns and Communications.

The National Trade Union Labour Party Liaison Organisation Committee comprises:

- General Secretaries of all Labour's affiliated unions
- Leader of the Labour Party
- Deputy Leader of the Labour Party
- General Secretary of the Party
- Deputy General Secretary of the Party
- Nominee from the trade union group of MPs

== See also ==
- Trade unions in the United Kingdom
- List of trade unions in the United Kingdom
- Labour Research Department
- Labour Party (UK) affiliated trade union
- Trades Union Congress
- Trade Union Group of Labour MPs
- Labour Party (UK) affiliated trade union
