= Customs and Excise Federation =

British trade union federation

The Customs and Excise Federation was a trade union federation representing civil servants in the United Kingdom.

The federation was founded in 1917 by the Customs and Excise Officers' Association, National Customs and Excise Federation, and the UOA. Other small unions representing specific workers in the HM Customs and Excise department of the British civil service joined later.

Later affiliates included:

- Customs and Excise Controlling Grades Association
- Customs and Excise Surveyors' Association
- Customs and Excise Waterguard Superintendents' and Waterguard Surveyors' Association

Although the unions retained some autonomy, the federation represented them in joint negotiations, and also represented them at the Trades Union Congress. By 1971, the federation represented a total of 4,300 members.

In 1972, the federation merged with the Customs and Excise Preventative Staff Association, the other significant union in the department, to form the Customs and Excise Group.
