= School governor =

Overseers of a school

In England, Wales and Northern Ireland, school governors are the overseers of a school. In state schools, they have three main functions:

- Giving the school a clear vision, ethos and strategic direction;
- Holding the headteacher to account for the educational performance of the school and its pupils; and
- Overseeing the financial performance of the school and making sure its money is well spent.

They are the largest volunteer force in the countries.

== State schools ==
=== Composition ===
In England, Wales and Northern Ireland, every state school has a governing body, consisting of specified numbers of various categories of governors depending on the type and size of school. Governors are unpaid, but they may be reimbursed for expenses for such as the care of dependants or relatives and travel costs. Under section 50 of the Employment Rights Act 1996, employers must give anyone in their employment who serves as a governor reasonable time off their employ to carry out their governor duties. Employers can decide whether this time off is given with or without pay.

Generally, the following categories are applicable:

- Parent governors: parents of children at the school;
- Staff governors: members of the school staff;
- Authority governors (previously known as LEA governors): nominated by the local education authority;
- Co-opted governors (previously known as community governors): members of the local community (appointed by the rest of the governing body);
- Foundation, partnership and sponsor governors: representatives of any sponsoring bodies.

The proportions vary between differing types of school, but as an example, in community schools, which are usually owned by the LEA, the regulations prescribe that parent governors should be at least one-third of the governors, staff governors at least two places, but no more than one-third, including the headteacher; LEA governors 20% and community governors at least 20%. Church schools will typically include a representative of the church in addition to the above categories. The minimum number of governors is nine, the maximum is twenty (although sponsor governors are additional to these numbers). Governors are appointed for a maximum of four years, this term is renewable.

The headteacher of each school is ex officio a staff governor, but can decline to take up the position. Should they decide not to become a member of the governing body, their place is left vacant.

Staff governors (other than the head teacher) are elected by the school staff and must be paid to work at the school, directly by the school (that is, not under an external contract such as catering or cleaning). At least one staff governor must be a teacher, and if there are three or more staff governors, at least one must be a member of the support staff. If no member of the appropriate category stands for election, the vacant place can be filled by an elected person from the other category (i.e. if no teachers wish to become governors, all staff governors may be support staff, and vice versa).

Parent governors can either be elected by parents of children at the school, or if insufficient numbers are elected, can be appointed by the governing body to fill any remaining vacancies. Such appointees need not be parents of children currently attending the school – if no suitable candidates are found, they may be parents of former pupils, or of any child of school age. Parents so appointed can be removed from their positions by a majority vote of the governing body.

Associate members may be appointed by the governing body as members of committees, and may include pupils, school staff, or anyone else who the governing body feel could contribute to its work. Their voting rights are decided by the governing body, and are also limited by law to exclude matters concerning the budget, admissions, pupil discipline and the election or appointment of governors. Associate members are not governors and are not included in the school's instrument of government.

By law, governing bodies meet at least three times every year, as a full governing body, where the ongoing business of committees, the governing body and the school are discussed, reported on and where decisions are taken by a majority vote. Most of the work of governors, however, is done at committee level.

=== Chair ===
The governing body is led by the chair, elected by the governing body from within its membership, though anyone who works at the school cannot stand for the office. Since 1 September 2003, the term of office for the chair can be set to more than one year.

The chair is supported in their work by one or more vice chairs, who may be delegated certain tasks or responsibilities. Certain tasks, including signing-off the school budget, can only be done by the chair. The process for election of chair and vice-chair and their term of office should be laid down in the governing body's standing orders.

The full governing body can remove the chair or any vice chairs by a majority vote of no confidence.

=== Clerk ===
The governors are supported in their work by a clerk to the governing body. In many schools this role is combined with that of bursar or administrative officer, although they may also be employed solely in a clerking role. In some areas clerking services may be provided by the local education authority. The clerk is remunerated for their work.

The clerk is usually considered an integral part of the governing body, giving advice whilst not entitled to vote. Their role is primarily one of providing advice and interpretation on the regulatory and administrative framework in which governors work, preparing and distributing minutes and agendas, keeping records and dealing with correspondence.

=== Responsibilities ===
The headteacher of the school is responsible for day-to-day management of the school. The role of the governing body is to provide strategic management, and to act as a "critical friend", supporting the work of the headteacher and other staff.

Schools generally have a delegated budget to cover salaries, running costs, maintenance and equipment; the governing body is responsible for managing this budget. They can decide how many and what types of staff to employ, which equipment to upgrade or replace and what the priorities are for implementing new strategies and initiatives.

Governors must appoint the headteacher, and may be involved in the appointment of other staff.

Governors also have a role in monitoring the school's progress, and in setting annual targets for the school's performance and for the headteacher (and ensuring that the headteacher sets targets for other staff).

Governors must review school exclusions in certain circumstances, and have the power to reinstate an excluded pupil or reduce the term of the exclusion (although not to increase it).

Foundation schools, voluntary aided schools and academies act as their own admissions authorities. In such schools, the governing body sets the admissions policy, makes admissions decisions and defends admissions appeals.

=== Committees ===
Most governing bodies use a committee structure to undertake their monitoring and evaluation roles. Membership and terms of reference of committees must be determined annually. Finance, staffing, admissions, health and safety, curriculum and premises committees are very common. Other areas covered by committees may include marketing, discipline and management. Many governing bodies form working groups to tackle specific problems.

Since 1 September 2003, particular committees can be given delegated powers to make decisions about the school that do not then require any approval by the full governing body

=== Training ===
Governors and clerks can be offered training and support either by the local authority, by central government or by other organisations.

=== Support organisations ===
There are a number of organisations, websites and resources that support governors and governing bodies in England and Wales.

The Key for School Governors is a subscription service which provides up-to-the-minute intelligence and resources to support governing boards. In addition to e-learning and online tools like Compliance Tracker, The Key offers free online governor induction in partnership with Governors for Schools and Lloyd's Banking Group.

The National Governors' Association is a representative body for school governors in England. The NGA is an independent charity. Governors can join the NGA as individuals, as members of a governing body, or through their local governors' association.

Governor Wales is the voice of governors of schools in Wales. Governor Wales is funded by the Welsh Government.

Governors for Schools is a government funded charity tasked with recruiting governors for governing bodies in England. Governors for Schools also receives support from business organisations. The Governors for Schools service is free to local education authorities, volunteers, employers and schools. In 2012, Governors for Schools began a partnership with the University of Manchester to ensure local schools have access to skilled governors.

GovernorLine offers free, confidential advice, information and support to school governors, clerks and individuals involved directly in the governance of maintained schools in England. GovernorLine is a free service delivered by an organisation called WorkLife Support, under contract to the UK government.

GovernorNet.co.uk was a UK government website with information for school governors. It was closed by the Department for Education in April 2011, with a recommendation to governors to use the variety of forums that are available including UK Governors and TES Connect.

== Independent schools ==
Private schools, and public schools in particular, generally have governing bodies, although by their very nature, such schools usually decide on their own requirements for their composition.

== Research ==
A study published in 1995 examined whether school governors were bodies of 'active citizens' providing opportunities for democratic participation in the governance of schools, or unpaid volunteers doing the bidding of the state. It also found that the composition and functioning of governing bodies was shaped by the social divisions of class, race and gender.

== See also ==
- School board
