= London Jewish Bakers' Union =

Former trade union of the United Kingdom

- Founded: 1890s
- Dissolved: 1970
- Location: United Kingdom

The London Jewish Bakers' Union (LJBU) was a trade union representing Jewish bakers based in London. It was the last trade union in the United Kingdom organised on ethnic lines.

The origin of the union is disputed; it may have lain in the International Bakers' Union, active in the East End of London from the 1890s. In 1903, it became the East London Bakers' Union, and it may have then become the "London Jewish Bakers' Union" in 1909. Foundation dates given for the union range from 1903 to 1909, when it was first registered.

In 1909, there were between 300 and 500 Jewish bakers, and by 1912, 200 were members of the union. In 1913, it led a six-month long strike, which achieved a pay increase of 3 shillings a week, and recognition from the London Jewish Master Bakers' association. This enabled the union to enforce a closed shop policy in many bakeries, and restrictions on the number of apprenticeships. The rival Amalgamated Union of Operative Bakers (AUOB) objected to this policy, and the two unions were frequently in dispute, for example, the LJBU opposing the AUOB's efforts to prohibit work on a Sunday. In 1914, the union established a joint board to resolve their disputes, and in 1920, the LJBU was accepted as a member of the Trades Union Congress. It also sponsored a successful union label scheme.

The union's leader during the UK general strike, Michael Prooth, was deported to the Soviet Union for cutting power to a bakery which was attempting to operate during the strike.

The number of Jewish bakeries in the East End declined, and with it, the membership of the union. By 1966, it was the only remaining union representing workers of a particular ethnicity. With only 48 members remaining, it decided to dissolve, this formally taking place in 1970.

== General Secretaries ==
1909: Isaac Sharp
1925: Michael Prooth
1926: L. Brenner
1934: Solomon Lever
1959: Post vacant
1964: R. Brooks
