= Jack Morrish =

British trade unionist and politician

John Edwin Morrish (23 September 1915 – 7 March 2003) was a British trade unionist and politician.

Born in London, Morrish attended school in Hampstead, then found work with the Post Office, becoming a technical officer. He joined the Post Office Engineering Union (POEU), and became known as a militant. He was elected to the union's London District Committee, and Sectional Council A. In March 1940, he asked a clerk to show him some confidential material which he was not entitled to see, believing that it contained information the membership should be aware of. His act was discovered, and he was expelled from the union. At the 1941 annual conference, his brother Harry made the case for his reinstatement, but it was voted down by a large majority. However, the following year, the union leadership agreed to readmit him, believing that with the Soviet Union now part of the Allied war effort, militants would no longer cause any problems. In 1944, he was sent to work in the coal mines until the end of the war as "Bevin Boy".

By 1948, Morrish was again a leading figure in the London POEU, and he was one of the organisers of a demonstration for wage increases, against the wishes of the union leadership. He was reminded of his previous expulsion, but a motion at conference for harsher measures against him was defeated. Unable to make progress in the POEU, in 1954 he found a full-time position with the Civil Service Union, rising to become the union's assistant general secretary. He remained there until 1972, when he was appointed as the general secretary of the Customs and Excise Group, which he led into a merger with the Society of Civil and Public Servants.

Morrish retired in 1976, and moved to Northamptonshire, and in 1981 he won election as a Labour Party member of Northamptonshire County Council, also serving as the council's deputy leader, and as chair of its education committee. In 1986, he moved back to London and was elected to the Hounslow London Borough Council, becoming vice-chair of its education committee. He served until 1990, when he returned to Northamptonshire, and from 1993 to 1998 served as a co-opted member of the county council's education committee. He was also involved in training school governors, and in 1994 he led the formation of the National Governors' Council, and serving as its first vice-chair.

In 1998, Morrish moved to Somerset, representing the county on the National Governors' Council, and acting as a governor of a local school.

Trade union offices
Preceded by New position	General Secretary of the Customs and Excise Group; 1972–1975	Succeeded by Union merged
