= Union for Woolwich Staff =

Former trade union of the United Kingdom

The Union for Woolwich Staff was a trade union representing workers at the Woolwich Building Society in the United Kingdom.

The union was founded in 1979 as the Woolwich Independent Staff Association. In 1999, it became known as the "Union of Woolwich Staff", and affiliated to the Trades Union Congress. In 2002, it merged into the UNIFI trade union, mirroring the purchase of the Woolwich by Barclays Bank.
