= J. S. Wilkie =

British politician and trade unionist

James Small Wilkie (1893 – 23 July 1947) was a British politician and trade unionist.

Born in Edinburgh, Wilkie served in World War I with the Royal Scots Fusiliers. After the war, he worked as a cooper, and joined the National Association of Coopers, winning election to its committee, then as its president, and finally working full time as its secretary. In order to take up this post, he moved to London, where he became active in the Labour Party, and won election to Battersea Metropolitan Borough Council.

In 1926, the various coopers' trade unions formed the Coopers' Federation of Great Britain, and in 1942, Wilkie was elected as its general secretary. He remained politically active, and at the 1946 London County Council election, he was elected to represent Battersea North. However, he soon became ill, and returned to Edinburgh, where he died in 1947, at the age of 54.

Trade union offices
Preceded by R. W. Mann	General Secretary of the Coopers' Federation of Great Britain; 1942–1947	Succeeded by Ted Pettengell
