= Retail Book Association =

British trade union

- Retail Book, Stationery and Allied Trades Employees' Association
- Founded: 1919; 107 years ago
- Location: United Kingdom
- Members: ▼706 (2024)
- President: David Pickles
- Website: rbaunion.org

The Retail Book Association is a trade union in the United Kingdom, representing workers at WHSmith.

The union was founded in 1919 as the Retail Book, Stationery and Allied Trades Employees' Association. Its membership has always been around 2,000, and the majority of its members always worked for W. H. Smith, although at times it has included members from other newsagents and bookshops. Based in London for many years, it moved to Swindon when WHSmith's head office relocated there. From the 1980s it has undertaken activity under the name of the "Retail Book Association", although the original title remains its officially registered name.

In its early days, the union was led by a general secretary, the post held successively by V. H. Pain, R. V. Motts and A. J. Johnson.

The union was affiliated to the Trades Union Congress for a period in the 1960s, but withdrew and instead linked with other unions through the General Federation of Trade Unions. It is no longer a member of either organisation. It has never had a political fund, but is entirely independent of WHSmith, representing members with grievances or who are subject to disciplinary action. It employs a full-time president and other members of staff.
