= Hull Seamen's Union =

The Hull Seamen's Union was a trade union representing sailors based in Kingston-upon-Hull, in England.

The union was founded in 1883 as the Hull Sailors' Mutual Association, and in 1887 it renamed itself as the Hull Seamen's and Marine Firemen's Association. In 1913, it changed its name to the "Hull Seamen's Union".

The union represented the majority of organised sailors in Hull, and the largest of the local seamen's unions in the United Kingdom. It was led by James Benjamin Butcher, who focused on maintaining good relations with shipowners, and was described by rival John R. Bell as "out of date and out of sympathy with all progressive movements".

In 1922, the union merged into the National Sailors' and Firemen's Union.

== General Secretaries ==
1880s: James Benjamin Butcher
c.1913: George William McKee
