= British Association of Colliery Management – Technical, Energy and Administrative Management =

BACM-TEAM
- British Association of Colliery Management - Technical, Energy and Administrative Management
- Merged into: Prospect
- Founded: 1940s
- Dissolved: 31 October 2014
- Headquarters: Edwinstowe, England
- Location: United Kingdom
- Members: 2,664
- Key people: Phil Huddleston, President; Pat Carragher, General Secretary
- Affiliations: TUC
- Website: bacmteam.org.uk

The British Association of Colliery Management – Technical, Energy and Administrative Management (BACM-TEAM) was a trade union in the United Kingdom. It merged with Prospect in 2014.

The union was founded in the early 1940s as the Yorkshire Association of Colliery Officials and Staff, representing managers in the coal industry, from oversmen up. It rapidly gained members across the country, and renamed itself as the British Association of Colliery Officials and Staff. In 1947, following the nationalisation of the coal industry, it became the British Association of Colliery Management.

The union tried to recruit workers at the new National Coal Board, but struggled as most were from a more radical tradition, and they instead formed the National Coal Board Labour Staff Association (LSA). Over time, the BACM became the leading union in negotiations relating to the board, and the LSA finally merged with it in 1971.

The union affiliated to the Trades Union Congress in 1977, by which time it had 15,769 members. However, due to the closure of much of the British mining industry, its membership was down to 5,640 in 1993, and it decided to recruit members in other industrial sectors. In 1997, the "Technical, Energy, and Administrative Membership" section was created to represent those members and, the following year, it was appended to the official name of the union. By 2004, 60 per cent of its membership worked outside the coal industry.
