= Diageo Staff Association =

Former trade union of the United Kingdom

- Founded: 1965
- Dissolved: 2010
- Headquarters: Park Royal, London
- Location: United Kingdom
- Members: 331 (2009)
- Key people: Tara Kelly, final chair
- Affiliations: TUC

The Diageo Staff Association was a small trade union in the United Kingdom.

The union was founded in 1965 as a staff committee at the Guinness brewery in Park Royal, London. Originally named the Guinness Brewing Staff Association, it gained a Certificate of Independence in 1979, when it had only 136 members. It was renamed the Guinness UDV Staff Association in 1998, when it also affiliated to the Trades Union Congress (TUC). In 2003, it adopted its final name, by which point it had 531 members. By 2009, its membership had fallen below 400, and it was the smallest union affiliated to the TUC.

The union was dissolved early in 2010.
