= Amalgamated Society of Blacksmiths, Farriers and Agricultural Engineers =

- Founded: 1891
- Dissolved: 1964
- Headquarters: 70 St James Street, Broughton, Salford
- Location: United Kingdom
- Members: 2,875 (1923)
- Affiliations: TUC

The Amalgamated Society of Blacksmiths, Farriers and Agricultural Engineers was a trade union representing farriers and related workers in the United Kingdom. It was the leading union in its industry.

The union was founded in 1891, when it was named the Manchester and District Farriers' Trade Protection Society. It soon started recruiting nationally, and in 1893 was renamed as the National Amalgamated Farriers' Society. By 1900, it had 1,200 members, already making it the largest union in the industry.

Numerous smaller unions merged into the Amalgamated, starting with the Yorkshire Farriers' Protection Society in 1896, and the Midland Counties Amalgamated Farriers' Society in 1897. In 1902, it absorbed its main rival, the Permanent Amalgamated Farriers' Protection Society, which brought in more than 1,000 new members. When the City of Liverpool Farriers' Society joined, in 1903, it covered more than 80% of unionised workers in the industry.

In the 1920s, the union renamed itself as the Amalgamated Society of Farriers and Blacksmiths, then in 1951, it became the "Amalgamated Society of Blacksmiths, Farriers and Agricultural Engineers". It survived until 1964, but the trade was in severe decline, and it was dissolved that year.

== General Secretaries ==
W. H. Briggs
1925: J. Hewitt
1940s: J. Baldwin
1948: H. E. Cooper
1961: H. Whitwell
