= Society of Goldsmiths, Jewellers and Kindred Trades =

Trade Union

The Society of Goldsmiths, Jewellers and Kindred Trades was a trade union representing workers in the jewellery industry and related trades in the United Kingdom.

Founded in 1893 as the London Society of Goldsmiths and Jewellers, it later affiliated with the Trades Union Congress and to the Universal Alliance of Diamond Workers. In the 1920s, it adopted its final name, and by 1950, had 1,932 members. In 1969, it merged into the National Union of Gold, Silver and Allied Trades.

== General Secretaries ==
1893: Sam Lowen
1926: Arthur J. Raxworthy
1951: John C. West
