= Union for Bradford and Bingley Staff and Associated Companies =

Former trade union of the United Kingdom

The Union for Bradford and Bingley Staff and Associated Companies (UBAC) was a trade union in the United Kingdom.

The union was founded in 1977 as the Bradford and Bingley Staff Association, changing its name in 2001. It represented staff working for Bradford and Bingley and for Alltel Mortgage Solutions, having 2,796 members by 2002. It was a founder member of the Financial Services Staff Federation and of the Alliance for Finance, and was affiliated to the Trades Union Congress.

In 2009, it merged with Advance.
