= Greater London Council Staff Association =

British trade union

- Merged into: GMB
- Founded: 1909
- Dissolved: 14 September 1988
- Headquarters: 150 Waterloo Road, London
- Location: England
- Members: 17,059 (1982)
- Publication: Greater London Staff Association Bulletin
- Affiliations: TUC

The Greater London Council Staff Association (GLCSA) was a trade union representing workers for the London-wide council.

The union was founded in 1909 as the London County Council Staff Association, to represent clerical, technical and professional staff at the London County Council. It was initially a section of the National Association of Local Government Officers (NALGO), but in 1916 it split from NALGO and became independent. It held a majority of trade union seats on the Whitley Council for London staff, although membership always remained below 20,000. While NALGO repeatedly tried to get the union to re-affiliate, association members feared that if it did so, the London Whitley Council would be merged into the national one for local authority workers.

In 1955, the union affiliated to the Trades Union Congress, ten years before NALGO followed suit. When the London County Council was replaced by the Greater London Council, the union changed its name to the Greater London Council Staff Association. In later years, it also represented workers at the Inner London Education Authority, London Ambulance Service, Thames Water Authority, and at polytechnics and probation services in the city.

Talks with NALGO over a possible merger were held in 1970, but they were broken off by the GLCSA.

In 1985, the union shortened its name to the Greater London Staff Association (GLSA). The Greater London Council was abolished in 1986, greatly reducing the union's membership. As a result, in 1988 it merged into the GMB.

== General Secretaries ==
1955: Laurence Welsh
1963: Frederick Thomas Hollocks
1980s: C. S. Corcoran
1986: Arthur Capelin
