= Alliance and Leicester Group Union of Staff =

Former trade union of the United Kingdom

The Alliance and Leicester Group Union of Staff (ALGUS) was a trade union representing employees of the Alliance and Leicester Building Society in the United Kingdom.

The Leicester Permanent Building Society Staff Association was certified as an independent trade union in 1979, at which time it had around 1,000 members. It merged with the Alliance Building Society Staff Association in 1988 to form the Alliance and Leicester Building Society Staff Association. This was later renamed the "Alliance and Leicester Group Union of Staff" and affiliated to the Trades Union Congress. In 2007, it merged into the Communication Workers' Union.
