= Association of Magisterial Officers =

Trade union in the United Kingdom

The Association of Magisterial Officers (AMO) was a trade union representing workers in magistrates' courts in the United Kingdom.

The union was founded in 1975, and later affiliated to the Trades Union Congress. By 2002, it had 6,344 members. In 2005, it merged into the Public and Commercial Services Union, which at the time represented slightly fewer court staff.

== General Secretaries ==
1978: Colin Clegg
1993: Rosie Eagleson
