= Tom Hurley (trade unionist) =

British trade unionist and politician

Thomas Hurley (died 21 October 1933) was a British trade unionist and politician.

== Life ==
Thomas Hurley was born in Blackburn, his parents having emigrated from Ireland, and being involved in the radical movement. Hurley became interested in socialism, and founded a branch of the Social Democratic Federation (SDF) in the town. He promoted the group by giving regular public speeches, and served for several years on the party's national executive.

In 1895, Hurley stood for the Blackburn School Board, and topped the poll. In 1898, he forced a vote for the town's elective auditor, and he also won that position. Finally, in 1899, he was elected to the borough council, representing St Paul's ward. In 1900, the SDF affiliated to the Labour Representation Committee, and Hurley was a leading campaigner for Philip Snowden in the Blackburn constituency at the 1900 UK general election.

Hurley resigned from the council in 1901. He tried to regain his seat on three occasions, but was unsuccessful. He remained a member of the SDF, and its successor, the British Socialist Party, in which he was part of the minority who supported British involvement in World War I.

Hurley worked variously as a shuttlemaker, a quarryman, and a club steward. He joined the National Union of General Workers, and became secretary of its local branch, but then transferred to the small Amalgamated Society of Shuttlemakers. He became a district organiser for the shuttlemakers, and then in 1919 was elected as the union's general secretary. He represented the union on Blackburn Trades Council, and in 1923, when the local trades council and Labour Party were merged, he became president. In 1925, he was elected as a Poor Law Guardian, and he eventually won a seat on the council, becoming leader of the Labour group.

== Death ==
Hurley died suddenly on 21 October 1933, while still in office.

Trade union offices
| Preceded by D. Isherwood | General Secretary of the Amalgamated Society of Shuttlemakers; 1919–1933 | Succeeded by John Crompton |
