= National Coal Board Labour Staff Association =

Former trade union of the United Kingdom

The National Coal Board Labour Staff Association (LSA) was a trade union representing workers at the National Coal Board in the United Kingdom.

The National Coal Board was established in the mid-1940s, on the nationalisation of coal mining in the United Kingdom. Most of its staff were former members of the National Union of Mineworkers (NUM), but the NUM did not feel it was appropriate to represent National Coal Board staff, while the majority of workers were reluctant to join the British Association of Colliery Management (BACM), which they felt was opposed to the labour movement and too closely aligned with senior management.

In 1947, Ebby Edwards worked with the un-unionised staff to establish the "National Coal Board Labour Staff Association", which immediately affiliated to the Labour Party and the Trades Union Congress. It advocated equal pay between its members and other civil servants, and this was soon achieved. Although it faced competition for members from the BACM, it remained the larger union in the department and retained official recognition until about 1970, but had to allow the BACM to take the lead on negotiations on pay and conditions. It then decided to try to negotiate separately, but this led to derecognition, and membership fell to around 200 by 1971, when it reluctantly merged into the BACM.
