= Association of Flight Attendants (UK) =

British trade union

- Local Council 7 - London (CWA Local 21007)
- Founded: 1945; 81 years ago
- Headquarters: 32 Wingford Road, London SW2 4DS
- Location: United Kingdom
- Members: ▼317 (2025)
- General Secretary: Michael Schwaabe
- Affiliations: TUC
- Website: afalhr.org.uk

The Association of Flight Attendants (LHR) is the British section of the international Association of Flight Attendants-CWA, a US-based trades union which represents nearly 60,000 flight attendants at 19 airlines. The Association of Flight Attendants is part of AFL-CIO affiliate, Communications Workers of America and a member of the International Transport Workers' Federation.

All AFA members working for the same airline and assigned to the same domicile form the Local Council. The President, Vice President and Secretary, who are elected to a three-year term by the members of each Local Council, form the Local Executive Council. AFA (LHR) is affiliated to the Trades Union Congress in the United Kingdom and organises among United Airlines cabin crew based at London Heathrow Airport.
