= Advance (trade union) =

British trade union

- Advance
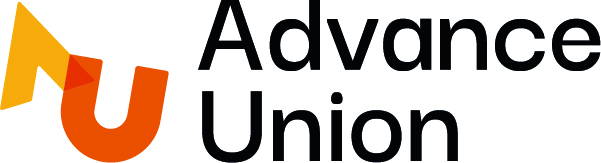
- Founded: 1977; 49 years ago
- Headquarters: Tring, England
- Members: ▼5,512 (2024)
- General Secretary: Jim Leonard
- Affiliations: TUC; A4F
- Website: advance-union.org

Advance is a certified, independent trade union affiliated to the TUC representing workers within the bank Santander UK, the UK subsidiary of Santander Group. The union was formerly known as the Abbey National Group Union (ANGU) before it expanded to include staff of Alliance & Leicester and Bradford & Bingley following their acquisitions by Santander. Its aims are the supporting and representing its members in all aspects of their employment.

== History ==
The union was established in 1977 as the Abbey National Staff Association, and it received a certificate of independence the following year. In 2001 concerns were raised about whether the union was 'genuinely independent' of the Abbey National, however, following enquiries, the Certification Officer confirmed its status without the need for a formal review.

The union affiliated to the Trades Union Congress in 1998. In 1999, it changed its name to ANSA - the independent union for Abbey National Staff, and in 2002 it changed it again, becoming the "Abbey National Group Union". By 2003, it had a membership of 8,970, three-quarters women, which was more than 30% of all staff eligible to join. It was renamed "Advance" in 2009 after the acquisition of Alliance & Leicester by the Santander Group. Later in the year, the Union for Bradford and Bingley Staff and Associated Companies merged with Advance after Santander bought the branches and savings business of Bradford & Bingley.

== Organisation ==
The current General Secretary is Jim Leonard, who has led the union since 2024. It has its Head Office in Tring, Hertfordshire, with a current membership of 8,063. Of its total expenditure in 2008 of £631,230, £161,194 was spent on services to directly to members.

The union organises various levels of representative, members holding 'lay positions' (i.e. unpaid, and additional to work duties). These are: Office representative; Area representative; Health & Safety representative; Lifelong Learning representative; and NEC representative.
