= Customs and Excise Group =

The Customs and Excise Group was a trade union representing civil servants working in customs and excise in the United Kingdom.

The union was founded in 1972, when the Customs and Excise Federation merged with the Customs and Excise Preventive Staff Association. The components of the former federation, including the Customs and Excise Controlling Grades Association and the Customs and Excise Surveyors Association, became affiliates of the new union. The union affiliated to the Trades Union Congress. Its general secretary was Jack Morrish.

The union had 12,000 members by 1973, and had grown to 13,148 by 1975, when it merged into the Society of Civil and Public Servants.
