= Coopers' Federation of Great Britain =

UK trade union

- Merged into: National Union of General and Municipal Workers
- Founded: 1926
- Dissolved: 1979
- Headquarters: 269 Burdett Road, Limehouse, London
- Location: United Kingdom
- Members: 10,000+ (1950s)
- Affiliations: TUC

The Coopers' Federation of Great Britain was a trade union representing coopers in the United Kingdom and, initially, also in Ireland.

The union was founded in 1926 as the Coopers' Federation of Great Britain and Ireland. It brought together five unions which retained a high level of independence:

Union	Founded	Affiliated	Merged
Amalgamated Society of Coopers	1878	1926	1970
Liverpool Coopers' Friendly, Trade and Burial Society	1843	1926	1965
Manchester, Salford and District Society of Brewers' and General Coopers	1845	1926	N/A
National Association of Coopers	1821	1926	1947
National Trade Union of Coopers	1947	1947	1970
Philanthropic Society of Journeymen Coopers of Burton-on-Trent and Vicinity	1853	1926	c.1969

With the long-term decline of the industry, its affiliates gradually merged. In 1970, the Amalgamated and the National merged and became an integral part of the union, leaving only the Manchester Coopers as an affiliate.

Membership of the union was more than 10,000 in the 1950s, but declined to only 1,000 in 1979. In 1978, the union renamed itself as the Coopers' and Allied Workers' Federation of Great Britain in an attempt to reposition itself, but it decided instead to merge into the National Union of General and Municipal Workers in 1979.

== General Secretaries ==
1926: George William Harrison
1927: R. W. Mann
1942: J. S. Wilkie
1948: Ted Pettengell
1970s: W. Marshall
