= Sheffield Wool Shear Workers Union =

Former trade union of the United Kingdom

SWSWU
- Sheffield Wool Shear Workers Union
- Founded: 1890
- Dissolved: August 7, 2007
- Headquarters: Sheffield, South Yorkshire
- Location: England
- Members: 9
- Key people: Bob Whomersley, Final General Secretary
- Affiliations: TUC

The Sheffield Wool Shear Workers Union was based in Sheffield, South Yorkshire, England. It was listed in the Guinness Book of Records (2000 edition) as being the smallest trades union in the world with just 10 members. In its last listing to the Trades Union Certification Officer it was down to nine members - six male and three female.

== History ==
The union was established in 1890 to raise funds to organise, protect and advance the trade. Other functions include legal assistance, securing better working conditions for workers and to look after elderly wool shear workers. All their members were employed by steel firm Burgon & Ball.

The union was originally known as the Sheffield Shear Makers, Grinders, Finishers and Benders Union. It affiliated to the National Amalgamated Union of Labour in 1914, but left again in 1920, adopting its final name.

Its final officer was Bob Whomersley, General Secretary, and it had headquarters in Rotherham. In 2004 it received an income of £112.95, all of which was spent on administrative expenses.

It was affiliated to the Trades Union Congress until its removal from the list of recognised Trades Unions on 7 August 2007 on the grounds that it had ceased to exist.

== General Secretaries ==
1890s: W. Wild
1900s: R. Oldfield
1900s: W. Ellis
1910s: H. Brammer
1923: J. Clixby
1943: P. Shaw
1951: G. W. Gore
1957: F. Timmins
1960: Jim Billard
1980s: Ray Cutler
1990s: Bob Whomersley
