= Bedstead Workmen's Association =

- Founded: 1889
- Dissolved: 1961
- Headquarters: 17 Stafford Street, Birmingham
- Location: United Kingdom
- Members: 2,500 (1899)
- Affiliations: TUC

The Bedstead Workmen's Association was a trade union representing workers making bedframes in the United Kingdom, particularly in the area of Birmingham.

The union was founded following a strike of bedframe workers in Birmingham in 1889. 4,000 workers went on strike, and they succeeded in winning a substantial pay increase. Fearing further industrial action, E. J. Smith of the employers' association agreed with the union to support a closed shop and representation on a joint wages board, in exchange for union members agreeing to only work for members of the employers' association.

This Bedstead Alliance was initially successful, membership of the union growing to 2,500 by 1899. It then began a gradual decline, falling to only 200 in the 1950s. During the 1910s and 1920s, the union was part of the Metal Trades Federation. In 1961, the union was dissolved.

== General Secretaries ==
1889: Walter Mills
c.1910: William Palmer
1950: R. Eastwood
