= Amalgamated National Union of Quarryworkers and Settmakers =

Former trade union of the United Kingdom

The Amalgamated National Union of Quarryworkers and Settmakers (ANUQ&S) was a trade union representing quarry workers in Britain and the Channel Islands.

The union was founded in 1914, when the National Union of Quarrymen merged with the Settmakers' Union of Great Britain and Ireland. On formation, it had 4,378 members.

The union had members from Scotland to the Channel Islands, although half of its members were in North Wales and the English Midlands. It was based at Leicester, where its secretary, James Slevin, and president, William Bennett, were based. The union also had a full-time branch secretary based on Guernsey, named Ozanne.

By the 1930s, the union's membership was in long-term decline, and its executive decided to merge with the National Union of General and Municipal Workers (NUGMW). At the time it claimed 8,000 members, although this included unemployed members who paid no membership fees. Despite this, it was the largest union to join the NUGMW since its formation in 1924. The merger was enacted at the start of 1934, with Bennett and Slevin both retiring in the summer, while Ozanne continued working for the new union.
