= Scottish Painters' Society =

- Merged into: Amalgamated Society of Painters and Decorators
- Founded: 1898
- Dissolved: 1963
- Headquarters: 6 Fitzroy Place, Sauchiehall Street, Glasgow
- Location: Scotland
- Members: 3,000 (1900); 12,112 (1962)
- Publication: Scottish Painters' Journal
- Affiliations: TUC, Labour

The Scottish Painters' Society was a trade union representing painters and decorators in Scotland.

The union was founded in 1898, as the Scottish National Federation of House and Ship Painters. By the end of the year, it had 1,227 members, and by 1900 this had risen to more than 3,000. Around this date, if became the Scottish Amalgamated Society of House and Ship Painters, then in 1903, it simplified its name, becoming the "Scottish Painters' Society".

The union merged into the Amalgamated Society of Painters and Decorators in 1963.

== General Secretaries ==
1899: Archibald Gardner
1924: Dugald McLean
1945: William Peat
1962: A. Black
