= Customs and Excise Preventive Staff Association =

The Customs and Excise Preventive Staff Association (PSA) was a trade union representing customs officials in the United Kingdom.

The union was in existence by 1947, when it was led by A. E. Farmer. It affiliated to the Trades Union Congress, and by 1971 it had 2,845 members. The following year, it merged into the Customs and Excise Group.

== General Secretaries ==
1947: A. E. Farmer
H. G. Farren
1967: R. J. Lowe
