= General Iron Fitters' Association =

The General Iron Fitters' Association was a trade union representing stove dressers in Scotland, particularly in the Falkirk area.

The union was founded in 1892, when it was named the Associated Society of Range, Stove and Ornamental Workers. Initially very small, with only 110 members, it grew to nearly 1,000 members by 1910, when it was renamed as the "General Iron Fitters' Association". It was based in Falkirk, but did recruit members in other areas of Scotland, principally Glasgow.

In 1965, the union renamed itself as the Scottish Metal Workers' Union, in the hope of attracting a wider membership, but this did not succeed, and instead in 1968 it merged into the General and Municipal Workers' Union.
