= Society of Shuttlemakers =

Former trade union of the United Kingdom

The Society of Shuttlemakers was a trade union representing workers involved in making shuttles for looms, in England. While always a small union, at its peak it represented 90% of workers in the industry.

The union was founded in 1891 as the Amalgamated Society of Shuttlemakers, representing workers in both Lancashire and Yorkshire. It grew slowly, reaching 277 members in ten branches by 1900, and 331 members by 1910. The union was a founder member of the General Federation of Trade Unions, and also affiliated to both the Labour Party and the Trades Union Congress.

After World War I, socialist Tom Hurley became the union's general secretary, and he was succeeded in 1933 by John Crompton, who led the union through its greatest period of success. By the end of World War II, membership peaked at 600, which was 90% of shuttlemakers in Britain.

The decades following the war proved difficult for the industry; the Lancashire cotton industry declined, the production of shuttles in India led to an end to exports, and the shuttleless loom was introduced. Membership fell to only 100 by the mid-1980s. One of the last pure craft unions in the UK, its decline accelerated, and by 1993 it had only seven members; this led it to dissolve.

== General Secretaries ==
Doctor Isherwood
1919: Tom Hurley
1933: John Crompton
1959: S. Brown
1970: E. V. Littlewood
1980s: Leslie Illingworth
