= Amalgamated Society of Coopers =

Former federated trade union in the UK and Ireland

The Amalgamated Society of Coopers was a trade union representing coopers in the United Kingdom and Ireland.

A National Association of Coopers, bringing together local unions, existed from 1854 until 1868, when a lengthy strike led it to collapse. Most of the local union survived, and by 1878 there was a desire to again form a national organisation. That year, thirteen unions formed the Mutual Association of Journeymen Coopers, which attempted to co-ordinate activity, but permitted each affiliate to control its own money and retain a high level of autonomy. The government of the union was rotated between different branches.

By 1888, the union had grown to 4,000 members in 27 affiliates, and this continued to grow, with the following unions affiliated by 1910:

| Union | Founded |
|---|---|
| Aberdeen General Coopers' Protective Society | 1907 |
| Alloa Journeymen Coopers' Society | 1873 |
| Belfast Coopers' Trade Union | 1812 |
| Birmingham, Wolverhampton and District Good Intent Coopers' Society | 1850 |
| Blackburn and District Society of Coopers | 1881 |
| Bradford and District Friendly Society of Coopers | 1868 |
| Bristol Friends of Humanity Society of Coopers | 1822 |
| Cork Coopers' Society | 1700 |
| Dundalk and District Coopers' Trade Union | 1894 |
| Glasgow Journeymen Coopers' Trade Society | 1851 |
| Good Intent Society of Coopers of Newcastle-on-Tyne and District | 1882 |
| Greenock Coopers' Society | 1879 |
| Hull Coopers' Society | 1853 |
| Leeds and District Society of Coopers | 1857 |
| Leith, Edinburgh and District Journeymen Coopers' Friendly and Protective Society | 1851 |
| Limerick Guild of Coopers | Unknown |
| Liverpool Coopers' Friendly, Trade and Burial Society | 1843 |
| Liverpool Dry and Tight Coopers' Association | 1895 |
| Livingston Society of Operative Coopers | 1865 |
| Londonderry and District Coopers' Trade Union | 1896 |
| London Hand-in-Hand Society of Coopers | 1824 |
| Manchester, Salford and District Society of Brewers' and General Coopers | 1845 |
| Northwich and District Coopers' Trade Society | 1896 |
| Nottingham Society of Coopers | 1897 |
| Philanthropic Society of Journeymen Coopers of Burton-on-Trent and Vicinity | 1853 |
| Regular Dublin Operative Coopers' Society | 1666 |
| St Helens Coopers' Friendly Trade Society | Unknown |
| Sheffield and District Society of Coopers | Unknown |
| Swansea Friends of Humanity Coopers' Society | 1872 |
| Tyne Hand-in-Hand Friendly Protecting Society of Journeymen Coopers | 1876 |
| United Society of Coopers (London) | 1821 |
| Warrington Coopers' Society | 1888 |
| Waterford Operative Coopers' Trade Union | 1884 |
| Widnes, Runcorn and District Coopers' Association | 1875 |

In 1919, the union renamed itself as the Amalgamated Society of Coopers. Despite its national scope, several rival coopers' unions existed, including the National Association of Coopers. In 1926, the Amalgamated Society, the National Association and three smaller unions formed the Coopers' Federation of Great Britain. The Amalgamated Society remained in existence as an affiliate, but declined in importance. In 1970, it merged fully into the federation.

== General Secretaries ==
E. Girling
1902: J. Carroll
1907: John Connell
1908: John Shankie
1909: A. J. Spiller
1911: George William Harrison
1914: R. W. Mann
1940s: T. B. Ford
