= National Union of Gold, Silver and Allied Trades =

Former trade union of the United Kingdom

NUGSAT
- National Union of Gold, Silver and Allied Trades
- Merged into: Technical, Administrative and Supervisory Section
- Founded: 1910
- Dissolved: 1981
- Headquarters: Kean Chambers, Mappin Street, Sheffield
- Location: United Kingdom, Ireland
- Members: 2308 (1979)
- Publication: Newssheet
- Affiliations: TUC, Labour

The National Union of Gold, Silver and Allied Trades (NUGSAT) was a trade union in Britain and Ireland. It represented workers in precious metals, jewellers, diamond polishers, electroplaters, watch and clock repairers and dental technicians.

The union was founded in Sheffield in 1910 as the Amalgamated Society of Gold, Silver and Kindred Trades, merging several local societies both in Sheffield and Dublin. In 1914, it merged with the Birmingham Silversmiths and Electroplate Operatives union, assuming its final name.

Membership remained low for many years - just over 200 in 1920, and fewer than 100 in 1930. It merged with the Society of Goldsmiths, Jewellers and Kindred Trades in 1969, pushing membership up to 250. The union's Irish members transferred to the Irish Transport and General Workers' Union in 1976, but membership of the union generally increased; by 1979, it had risen to 2,308. In 1981, NUGSAT was absorbed into the Technical, Administrative and Supervisory Section.

== General Secretaries ==
1911: William Kean
1953: J. Edley
1962: J. W. Hodgkinson
1980s: Brian Bridge

== See also ==
- National Union of Gold, Silver, and Allied Trades v Albury Brothers Ltd
