= Managerial and Professional Officers =

Former trade union of the United Kingdom

- Merged into: GMB
- Founded: 1 January 1986
- Dissolved: 2000
- Headquarters: Terminus House, The High, Harlow
- Location: England
- Members: 12,000 (1991)
- Key people: Graham Corless (Gen Sec)
- Affiliations: TUC

Managerial and Professional Officers (MPO) was a trade union representing senior staff working for local authorities in the United Kingdom.

The union originated as the Federation of Professional Officers' Associations, a loose body founded in 1975. It brought together various small staff associations in order that they could more effectively take part in the Professional and Technical A Whitley Council negotiations on pay and conditions. While most local authority staff were represented by the National and Local Government Officers' Association (NALGO), the federation believed that NALGO did not represent the interests of senior staff, and that because many such staff managed workers who were members of NALGO, a conflict of interest would arise unless the senior staff had separate representation.

In 1986, the associations which were members of the federation voted to unify as a single union, the Federation of Managerial and Professional Officers' Unions (FUMPO). Nineteen small unions took part in the merger:

- Association of Education Officers
- Association of Local Authority Chief Architects
- Association of Local Government Lawyers
- Association of Local Government Personnel Officers
- Association of Local Government Supplies Officers
- Association of Official Architects
- Association of Passenger Transport Executives and Managers
- Association of Planning Officers
- Association of Public Service Professional Engineers
- Guild of Directors of Social Services
- Guild of Local Authority Valuers and Estate Surveyors
- Guild of Water Service Senior Officers
- National Association of Chief Environmental Health Officers
- National Association of Chief Housing Officers
- National Association of Chief Leisure Officers
- National Union of Local Authority Secretaries
- Society of Chief Trading Standards Officers
- Society of Metropolitan and County Chief Librarians
- Society of Public Analysts and Other Official Analysts

As all the associations were small organisations, the new union had a membership of only 7,770. Union membership was opened to all local authority staff earning more than a specified salary, and also to senior managers in various public and private utilities, and people with some specific qualifications.

Three other small associations joined FUMPO later, including the Association of Scottish Local Government Directors of Personnel and the Greater London Council Senior Staff Guild in 1989, and by 1991 membership had reached 12,000. The Whitley Council was succeeded by the Joint Negotiating Committee for Local Authorities' Chief Officers and Deputies, and FUMPO held a majority of trade union seats on this body.

In 1996, the union appointed a new general secretary, and under their leadership, the union renamed itself as "Managerial and Professional Officials", and affiliated to the Trades Union Congress (TUC) for the first time. The union believed that TUC affiliation could reduce tricky competition with NALGO's successor, UNISON, and also access to the TUC's support and training. However, the union did not affiliate to the Labour Party, perhaps because many senior local government staff did not support that party.

Despite a merger with the Society of Chief Officers of Probation early in 2000, MPO membership had fallen back to only 8,000, and later in the year the union merged into the GMB.
