= Amalgamated Society of Painters and Decorators =

Former trade union of the United Kingdom

- Merged into: Amalgamated Society of Woodworkers and Decorators
- Founded: 1855
- Dissolved: 1970
- Headquarters: 55 South Side, Clapham, London
- Location: United Kingdom
- Members: 17,377 (1907); 68,362 (1968)
- Affiliations: TUC, ITUC, NFBTO, Labour

The Amalgamated Society of Painters and Decorators (ASPD) was a trade union in the United Kingdom which existed between 1886 and 1970.

== History ==
The union had its origins in the Manchester Alliance of Operative House Painters, founded in 1855, which loosely grouped together local unions based in Ashton-under-Lyne, Hyde, Macclesfield, Manchester, Nottingham, Sheffield and Stockport. The union had no executive committee and its general secretary, William MacDonald, did not attempt to control the actions or finances of the local societies, instead devoting his time to writing pamphlets espousing his views on trade unionism and the painting trade.

The union claimed 3,980 members by 1867, but MacDonald's neglectful approach led him to be sidelined as honorary secretary, and replaced by Thomas Sharples, who began issuing regular reports, but made no other changes to the union's practices. The union underwent numerous name changes before emerging in 1886 as the more closely unified National Amalgamated Society of Operative House Painters and Decorators. It merged with the Amalgamated Society of House Decorators and Painters and several smaller unions in 1904, to form the National Amalgamated Society of Operative House and Ship Painters and Decorators (NASOHASPAD). At some point in the 1930s or 1940s, it shortened its name to the National Society of Painters.

In 1961, the union absorbed the Scottish Painters' Society and the Southport and Birkdale Operative House Painters' Association to form the Amalgamated Society of Painters and Decorators, but in 1970 it merged with the Amalgamated Society of Woodworkers, forming the Amalgamated Society of Woodworkers and Decorators.

== Election results ==
The union sponsored a Labour Party candidate in several Parliamentary elections.

Election	Constituency	Candidate	Votes	Percentage	Position
January 1910 general election	Holmfirth	William Pickles	1,643	14.9	3
1929 general election	Kingston upon Hull North West	William Pickles	10,700	30.1	2
1931 general election	Pudsey and Otley	William Pickles	10,013	24.0	2
1935 general election	Huddersfield	William Pickles	23,844	39.2	2

== General Secretaries ==
1855: William MacDonald
1866: Thomas Sharples
1890: George Sunley
1910: Joseph Parsonage
1918: J. A. Gibson
1947: Sidney Horsfield
1960s: Albert Austin
