= National Cutlery Union =

Former trade union of the United Kingdom

- Merged into: National Union of General and Municipal Workers
- Founded: 1914
- Dissolved: 1 January 1957
- Headquarters: Foresters' Hall, Trippet Lane, Sheffield
- Location: United Kingdom
- Members: 1,072 (1914)
- Key people: Harold Slack (Secretary)
- Affiliations: TUC, Labour

The National Cutlery Union was a trade union representing workers involved in the manufacture of cutlery in the United Kingdom, particularly in Sheffield.

The union originated in 1914 when the Table and Butcher Knife Hafters' Trade and Provident Society merged with the Table and Butcher Blade Smithers' Association, forming the Cutlery Union. This initially had 1,072 members, but the figure gradually fell, reaching only 589 members in 1938. That year, it merged with the Amalgamated Scissors Workers Trade, Sick and Funeral Society, and added "National" to its name.

From the start, the union admitted women as members, and about half the women working in cutlery manufacture in Sheffield were said to be members by 1920. However, women were not initially eligible for the union's sickness benefits.

In 1957, the union merged into the National Union of General and Municipal Workers. By this time, the union had about 900 members.

The union's secretary and treasurer was Harold Slack, who also served as a Labour Party member of Sheffield City Council. He was considered for membership of the Design Council, but was ultimately not appointed. Other union officials included Eddie Wood, who in his spare time officiated the 1933 FA Cup Final.
