= National Woolsorters' Society =

Former trade union of the United Kingdom

The National Woolsorters' Society (NWS) was a trade union representing workers involved in sorting wool in the United Kingdom, principally in Yorkshire.

== History ==
The union was founded in 1889 in Bradford, as the National Union of Woolsorters. By 1892 it had three branches and a total of 798 members. The following year, T. Grundy was elected as its general secretary, and he became known for leading campaigns against woolsorters' disease, which was later found to be caused by anthrax.

The union was affiliated to the Labour Party, and to the National Association of Unions in the Textile Trade.

In 1920, the union renamed itself as the "National Woolsorters' Society", and saw its period of greatest success, membership peaking at 2,579 in 1925. It then fell to just under 2,000 and remained at this level until the 1960s, when it again began dropping. By 1980, it had only 676 members remaining, and this led it to merge into the Association of Professional, Executive and Computer Staff on 9 May.

== General Secretaries ==
Edward Hatton
1893: T. Grundy
1925: Sydney Bedford
1948: Norman Newton
