= GMB (trade union) =

General trade union in the United Kingdom

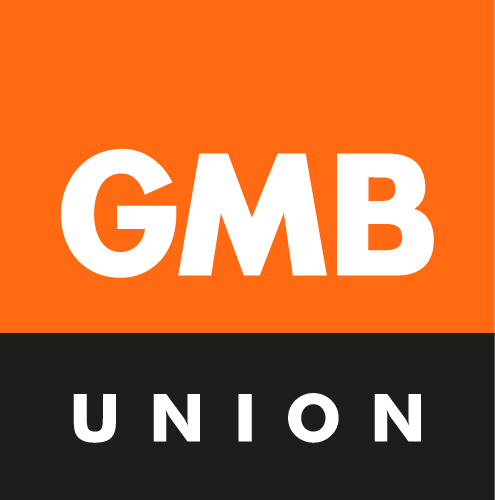
- Founded: 1924; 102 years ago
- Headquarters: London, England
- Location: United Kingdom
- Members: ▼571,497 (2024)
- General Secretary: Gary Smith
- Affiliations: TUC, ICTU, STUC, CSEU, Labour Party, EPSU
- Website: gmb.org.uk

The GMB is a general trade union in the United Kingdom which has more than 560,000 members. Its members work in nearly all industrial sectors, in retail, security, schools, distribution, the utilities, social care, the National Health Service (NHS), ambulance service and local government.

== Structural history ==
The National Amalgamated Union of Labour (NAUL), National Union of General Workers (NUGW) and the Municipal Employees' Association (MEA) merged in 1924 to form a new union, named the National Union of General and Municipal Workers (NUGMW). Although the new union was one of the largest in the country it grew relatively slowly over the following decades; this changed in the 1970s when David Basnett created new sections for staff, and hotel and catering workers, and changed the union's name to the General and Municipal Workers' Union (GMWU) in 1974.

In 1982, following a merger with the Amalgamated Society of Boilermakers, Shipwrights, Blacksmiths and Structural Workers (ASBSBSW), the union was renamed the General, Municipal, Boilermakers and Allied Trade Union (GMBATU). This was sometimes shortened to "GMB", which in 1987 became the official name of the union. For several years following the highly contested merger boilermaker members retained a distinct identity in GMB's Craft Section.

The union has absorbed the following smaller unions:

- 1924: Chatham Government Labourers' Union, St Helens Sheet Glass Flatteners' Trade Protection Society
- 1929: Cumberland Iron Ore Miners' and Kindred Trades' Association
- 1931: Cleveland Ironstone Quarrymens' Association, North Yorkshire and Cleveland Miners' Association
- 1933: Saw Grinders Trades Protection Society of Sheffield
- 1934: Amalgamated National Union of Quarryworkers and Settmakers
- 1935: Southern Counties Agricultural and Rural Workers
- 1936: National Society of Woolcombers and Allied Trades, Welsh Artisans' United Association
- 1938: Saw Handle Makers' Trade Society of Sheffield
- 1946: Aircraft Inspectors' Association, National Edge Tool Trade Society
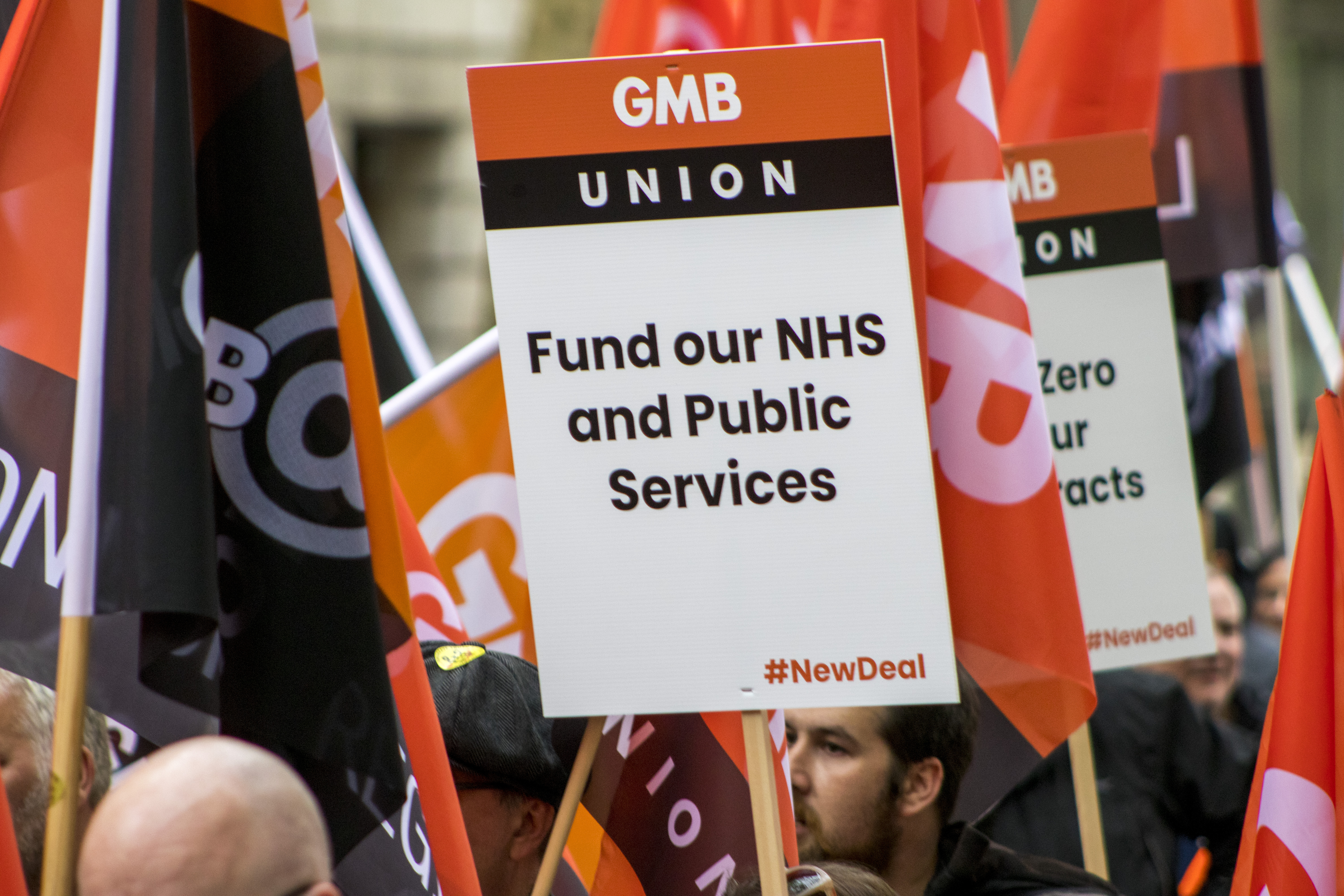
- GMB Union banner at the TUC New Deal demonstration in 2018
  1955: South Durham and North Yorkshire Salt Makers' Union
- 1957: National Cutlery Union
- 1958: British Airways Administrative Staffs Association
- 1962: Elastic Web Weavers' Union
- 1964: Amalgamated Union of File Trades, Ulster Transport and Allied Operatives Union
- 1965: Stoke Prior Salt Makers', Mechanics' and General Labourers' Union
- 1966: HM Stationery Staff Machine Association
- 1968: Scottish Metal Workers' Union, Scottish Operative Glaziers' Society, Wool, Yarn and Warehouse Workers' Union
- 1969: Union of Salt, Chemical and Industrial General Workers, Winsford Salt Makers
- 1972: Manchester Warehouse Employees Association, National Union of Water Works Employees
- 1974: BSR Staff Association, National Pen Workers' Federation, United Rubber, Plastic and Allied Workers' Union
- 1975: Scottish Football Players' Union
- 1979: Coopers and Allied Workers' Federation of Great Britain
- 1982: Amalgamated Society of Boilermakers, Shipwrights, Blacksmiths and Structural Workers, Northern Ireland Professional Footballers' Association
- 1983: Scottish Lace and Textile Workers' Union
- 1986: Amalgamated Textile Warehouse Operatives (two branches), Amalgamated Textile Workers' Union (plus eight affiliates)
- 1988: Greater London Staff Association
- 1989: Association of Professional, Executive, Clerical and Computer Staff, Association of Professional Music Therapists
- 1990: Legal Aid Staff Association, National Union of Labour Organisers
- 1991: Furniture, Timber and Allied Trades Union, National Union of Tailors and Garment Workers
- 1998: British Gas Managers' Association
- 2000: Managerial and Professional Officers
- 2002: International Union of Sex Workers
- 2007: General Union of Loom Overlookers
- 2008: Ambulance Service Union
- 2010: Community and District Nursing Association
- 2015: Unity

In 1992, the GMB for the first time allocated all of its members to one of eight industrial sections: clothing and textiles; commercial services; construction, furniture and allied; energy and utilities; engineering; food and leisure; process; and public services.

The GMB's sections were rationalised in 2006, with the union since then consisting of GMB Commercial Services, GMB Manufacturing, and GMB Public Services.

=== GMB Credit Union ===
To serve its members with ethical loans and finance and helpful support, GMB launched a standalone credit union offering in 1998.

Founded as Thorne Credit Union after Will Thorne, founder of NUGW forerunner, the National Union of Gas Workers and General Labourers and one of the first Labour Members of Parliament, the credit union began life as GMB Lancashire Region Credit Union before being rolled out nationwide in 2000. Today, the credit union serves over 10,000 nationwide and growing rapidly.

The credit union is authorised by the Prudential Regulation Authority and regulated by the Financial Conduct Authority and the PRA. Ultimately, like the banks and building societies, members' savings are protected against business failure by the Financial Services Compensation Scheme.

== Employment status court cases ==
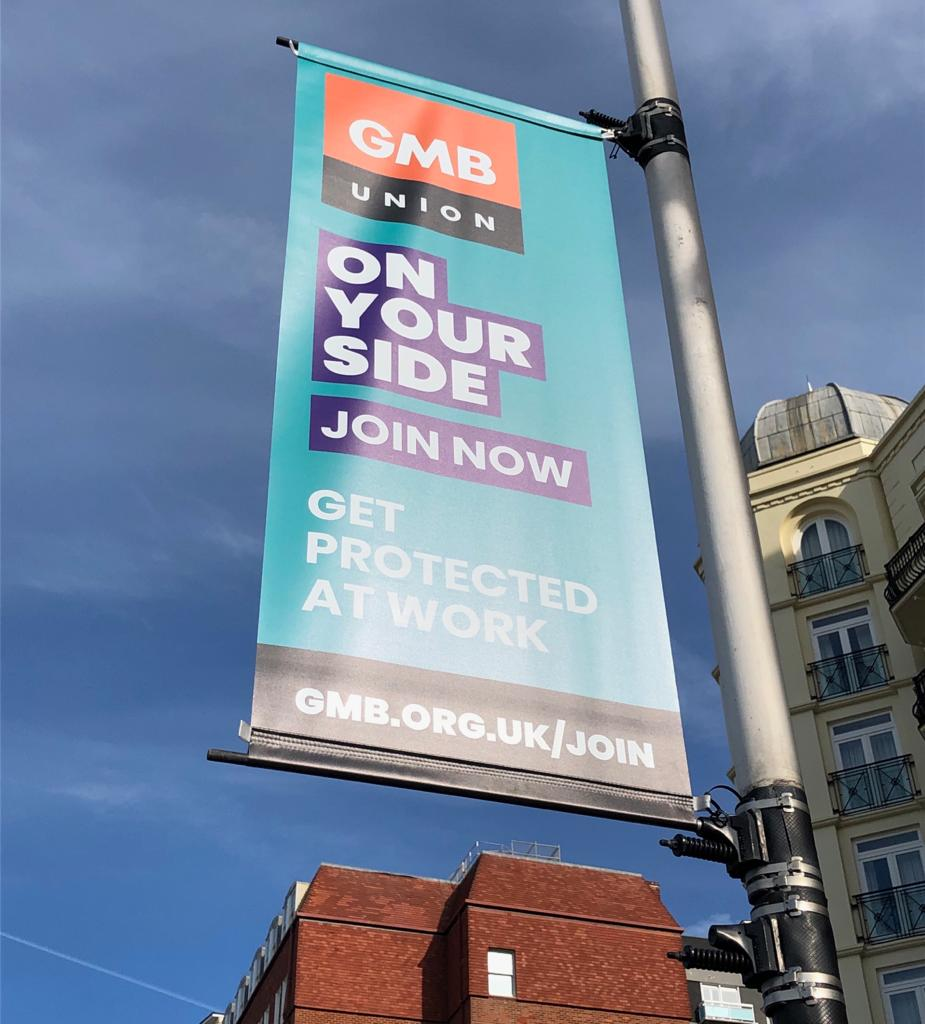
GMB lampost banner in 2019 in Brighton

On 19 February 2021, the Supreme Court unanimously held that Uber drivers' employment status is determined by the facts surrounding their employment and not their contracts, which describe them as self-employed: due to Uber's control over their working conditions they are workers entitled to the minimum wage, paid holiday, sick leave, workplace pensions, and other normal worker entitlements. Two Uber drivers had brought the case to the Employment Tribunal with the assistance of the GMB Union on 20 July 2016, as a test case on behalf of a group of 19 drivers.

The law firm Leigh Day started the legal action against Uber on behalf of 25 members of the GMB union, which initially included J. Farrar and Y. Aslam, although the two pursued this latest case with a different union, the Independent Workers' Union of Great Britain.

On 10 February 2017 a similar case involving Pimlico Plumbers was confirmed at the Court of Appeal. A worker who had suffered a heart attack was found to have been unfairly or wrongfully dismissed.

Another similar case against parcel delivery company Hermes Group, supported by the GMB through lawyers Leigh Day, had a similar outcome at an employment tribunal in Leeds on 25 June 2018. The GMB stated the ruling was likely to affect 14,500 Hermes couriers. General Secretary, Tim Roache, described it as:

another nail in the coffin of the exploitative, bogus self-employment model which is increasingly rife across the UK ... Bosses can’t just pick and choose which laws to obey. Workers' rights were hard won, GMB isn’t about to sit back and let them be eroded or removed by the latest loophole employers have come up with to make a few extra quid.

In 2019 Hermes and GMB entered into a collective bargaining agreement in which "self-employed" couriers could receive holiday pay and guaranteed earnings.

== Political activity ==
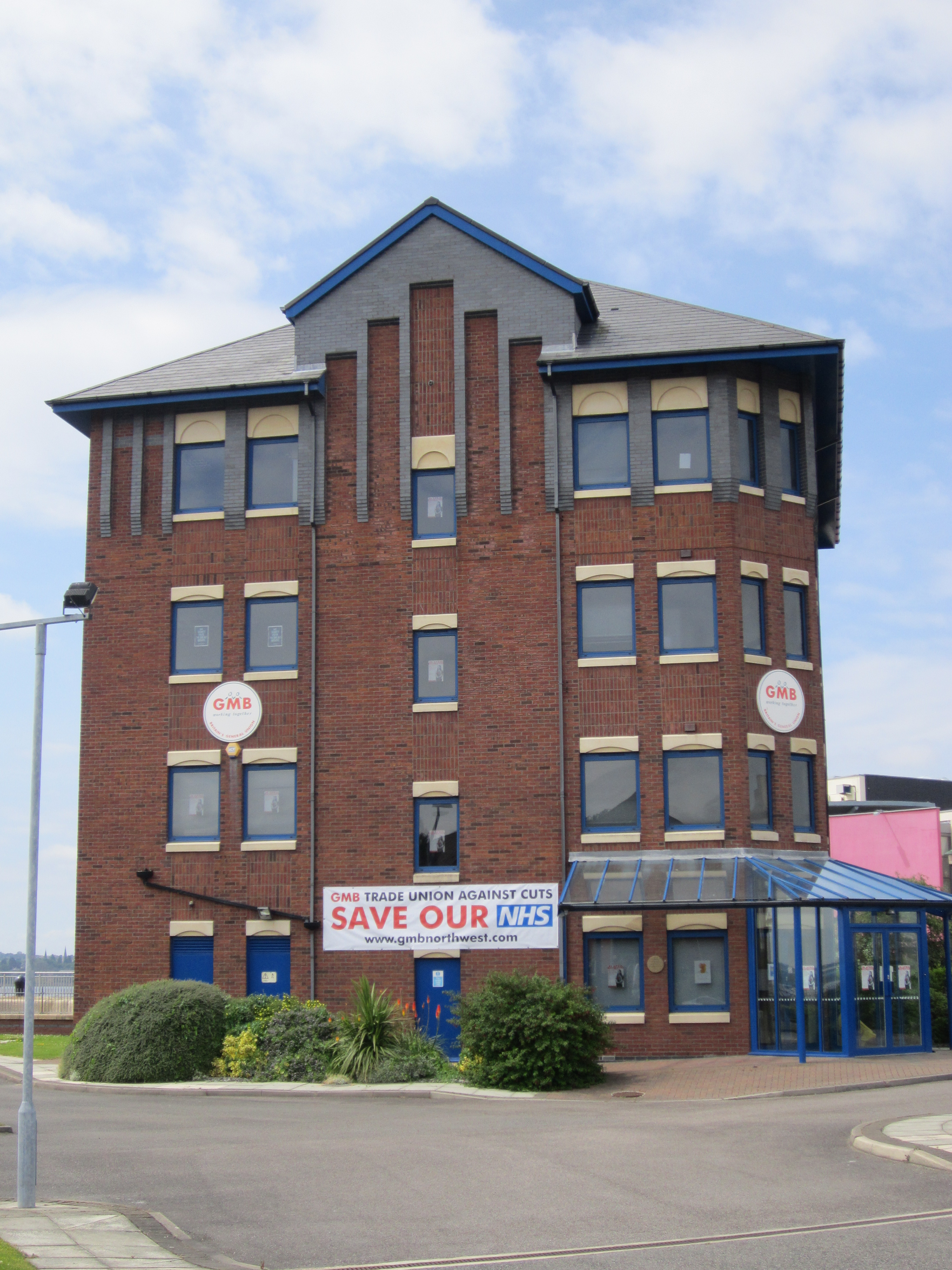
GMB offices in Liverpool

GMB is one of the three largest affiliates of the Labour Party. It is a significant financial contributor to the party's national and local organisation. The Guardian reported in 2012 that GMB gives Labour up to £2 million a year in affiliation fees and other funds, making it the third largest union donor to the party.

In 1991, GMB was the first British trade union to set up an office in Brussels and has been particularly engaged in seeking to influence European Union legislation that sets minimum standards for workers and for health and safety across the EU single market.

In 2008, GMB Congress voted to withdraw local funding from around a third of the 108 Labour MPs whose constituencies received support from GMB, due to the perception that some MPs within the party were treating workers with "contempt" and generally not working in the interests of the working class and GMB members. Despite this the Congress opposed disaffiliation from the party.

In the 2010 Labour Leadership Election, GMB endorsed Ed Miliband over his competitor and brother David Miliband.

In 2013, GMB announced it was cutting its affiliation fund from £1.2 million to £150,000 by reducing the number of members it affiliates from 420,000 to 50,000.

In 2013, GMB Congress, the lay member ruling body, adopted a 14-point plan to encourage GMB members to become active in the Labour Party and to stand as Labour candidates for public office (Parliament and local government). GMB has two representatives on the National Executive Committee (NEC) of the Labour Party, Kathy Abu-Bakir and Gavin Sibthorpe. In Ireland, GMB is affiliated to the Irish Labour Party.

While in the 2015 Labour leadership election GMB did not endorse a candidate, in the 2016 Labour leadership election, the union endorsed Owen Smith against incumbent leader Jeremy Corbyn.

Under the leadership of Jeremy Corbyn, the GMB clashed with the party over the issues of Trident renewal and fracking, both of which are opposed by Corbyn.

In the 2020 Labour leadership election, the GMB endorsed Lisa Nandy, who subsequently finished third.

== Leadership ==
The GMB is led by a general secretary and treasurer. In 2005 Paul Kenny was appointed the acting general secretary, in place of Kevin Curran who stepped down after being suspended on full pay during an inquiry into ballot-rigging during the union's leadership election. The episode was seen as a power struggle between the national office and powerful regional heads, led by Kenny, who opposed centralisation. Kenny had lost the 2003 vote to Curran. In May 2006, Kenny was elected unopposed as general secretary.

Tim Roache was elected as general secretary and treasurer in November 2015, receiving 56.7% of the vote on a turnout of 4.2%, beating the one other candidate, Paul McCarthy. Roache took up the post in 2016, but resigned in April 2020 after allegations of harassment.

=== General secretaries ===
1924: Will Thorne
1934: Charles Dukes
1946: Tom Williamson
1962: Jack Cooper
1973: David Basnett
1986: John Edmonds
2003: Kevin Curran
2005: Paul Kenny
2016: Tim Roache
2021: Gary Smith

=== Deputy general secretaries ===
This post was known as "assistant general secretary" until 1935.

1924: Peter Tevenan and Ralph Spence
1933: Ralph Spence
1935: Post abolished
1991: Tom Burlison
1996: Steve Pickering
2003: Debbie Coulter
2008: Post vacant

=== Presidents ===
This position was known as "chair of the executive" or "national chairman" from 1938 until the early 1990s.

1924: J. R. Clynes
1938: Fred Marshall
1946: Thomas William Kerry
1949: William E. Hopkin
1952: Jack Cooper
1962: Bernard Swindell
1964: Charles Smith
1970: Alexander Mitchell Donnet
1976: Derek Gladwin
1982: Dick Pickering
1987: James Morrell
1988: Olga Mean
1992: Dick Pickering
1997: Mary Turner
2018: Barbara Plant

== 2020 internal sexism inquiry ==
In 2020, following the resignation of general secretary Tim Roache and subsequently receiving anonymous allegations, the union conducted a barrister-led internal inquiry. This concluded that bullying, misogyny, cronyism and sexual harassment were "endemic" within the union. More specifically the report stated "The GMB is institutionally sexist. The General Secretaries and all regional secretaries are, and always have been, men. Women are underrepresented throughout the GMB’s ranks", concluding that culture must change for the GMB to become a safe and rewarding place for women. The report made 27 recommendations for change, on which the union's National President, Barbara Plant, promised to act.

In August 2025, an inquiry follow-up found that only 11 out of about 27 recommendations had been fully implemented.

In 2026, the union was facing unfair dismissal claim from a female member of its senior leadership team sacked for alleged racism months after she had made a complaint of bullying and harassment against the general secretary and other senior staff. Another female member of the senior leadership team had also reported bullying and harassment.

== Sports sponsorship ==
The GMB sponsors the Nottingham Panthers ice hockey team and the Castleford Tigers rugby league team.

Until May 2011 it sponsored Swindon Town Football Club, but when Paolo Di Canio was appointed manager the GMB terminated the relationship because of Di Canio's political views. A GMB spokesman said: "He has openly voiced support for Mussolini so it beggars belief that Swindon could have appointed him, especially given the multi-ethnic nature of the team and the town." The union sponsored Port Vale for the 2013–14 football season.

== See also ==
- History of trade unions in the United Kingdom
- List of trade unions in the United Kingdom
- List of trade unions
- Association of Professional, Executive, Clerical and Computer Staff
- G.M.B. National College, Manchester
- Credit unions in the United Kingdom
- Smudge (People's Palace cat), the only official feline member
