= British Malayan headhunting scandal =

Political scandal in Britain in 1952

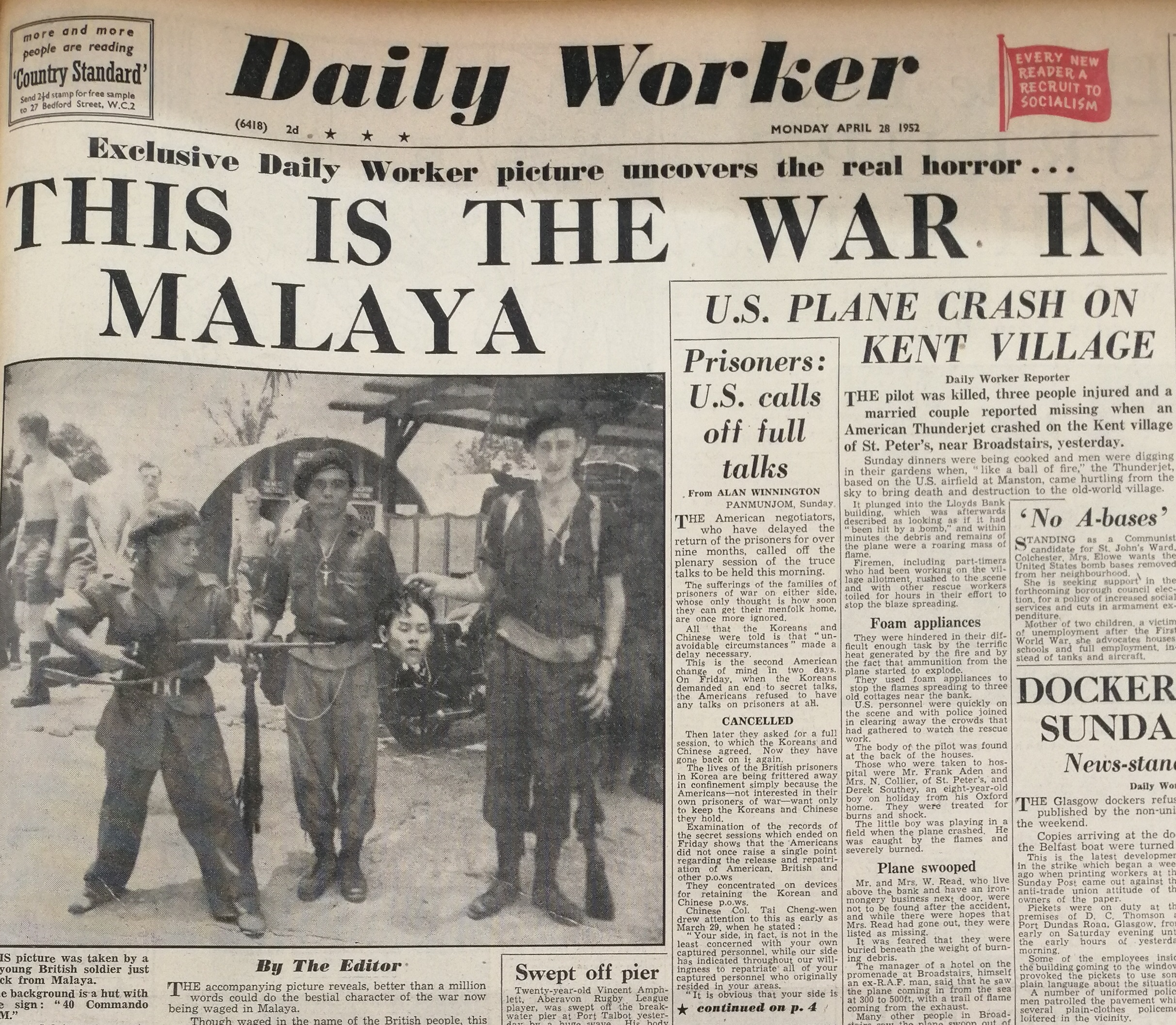
The scandal was sparked by the Daily Worker's publication of the article "This is the War in Malaya" (April 28, 1952).

A political scandal took place in 1952, during the Malayan Emergency, where the British military and its allies in Malaya engaged in a systemic headhunting program targeting people suspected to be part of the communist Malayan National Liberation Army (MNLA). Beginning in April 1952, under editor J.R. Campbell, the Daily Worker published several photos of British soldiers and their allies posing with severed heads. The British military initially denied the authenticity of the photos, then refused to comment, and then weeks later admitted that the photos were genuine. Campbell went on to send photographic evidence of British soldiers headhunting and scalping to the wider media, British politicians, and then-prime minister Winston Churchill. The practice was revealed to be widespread among British troops, sanctioned by general Gerald Templer.

The scandal led to Churchill declaring that he would order the British military to stop this practice, although Churchill's order was widely ignored. The British government refused to punish any soldiers involved in it, saying that soldiers were never explicitly forbidden from mutilating corpses.

== The scandal ==
The scandal was sparked by the Daily Worker's publication of photographs depicting British soldiers fighting in the Malayan Emergency posing with the severed head of suspected anti-colonial guerrillas belonging to the Malayan National Liberation Army (MNLA). The images were published in the Daily Worker under the supervision of communist activist J.R. Campbell as the paper's editor.

The decapitation of suspected MNLA members was subsequently found to have been a common and widespread practice by British troops in Malaya that had been sanctioned by Gerald Templer, the UK Chief of the Imperial General Staff. It was also found that the British military had hired over 1,000 mercenaries from Iban headhunting tribes in Borneo to fight in Malaya with the promise they could keep the scalps of the people they killed.

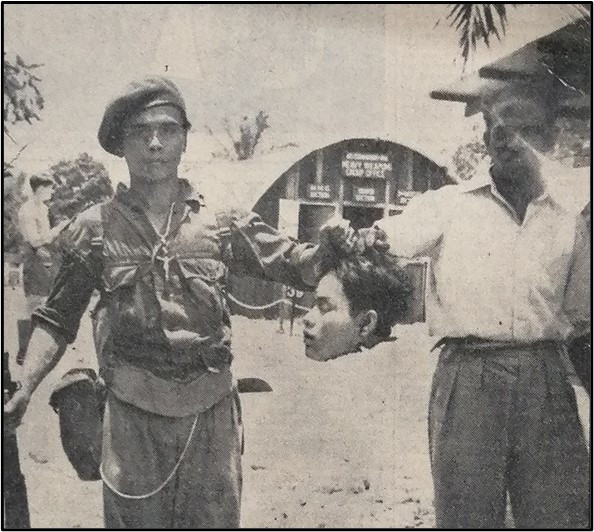
Commonwealth soldiers pose with a severed head inside a British military base in Malaya during the Malayan Emergency

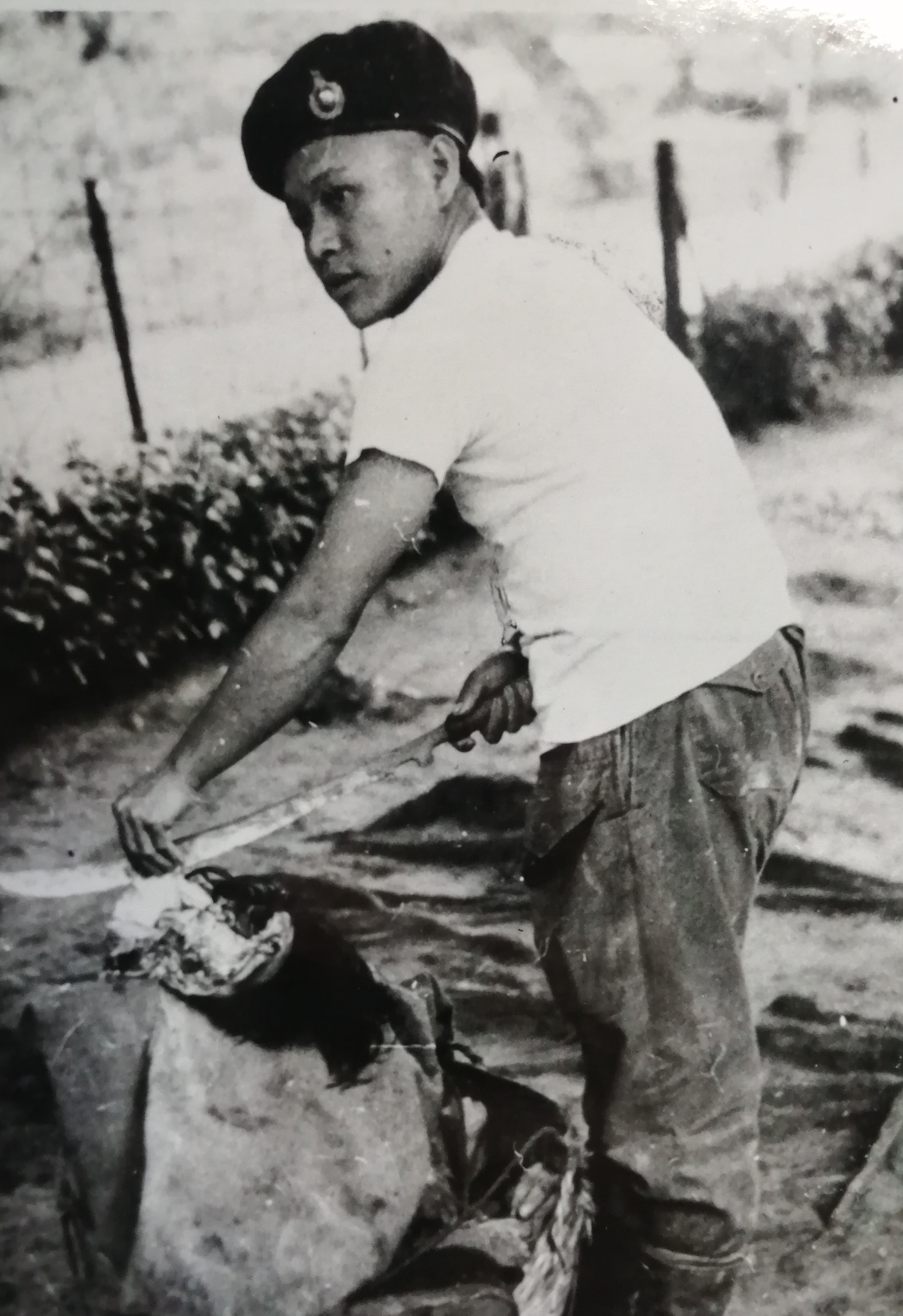
An Iban headhunter wearing a Royal Marine beret prepares a human scalp above a basket of human body parts.

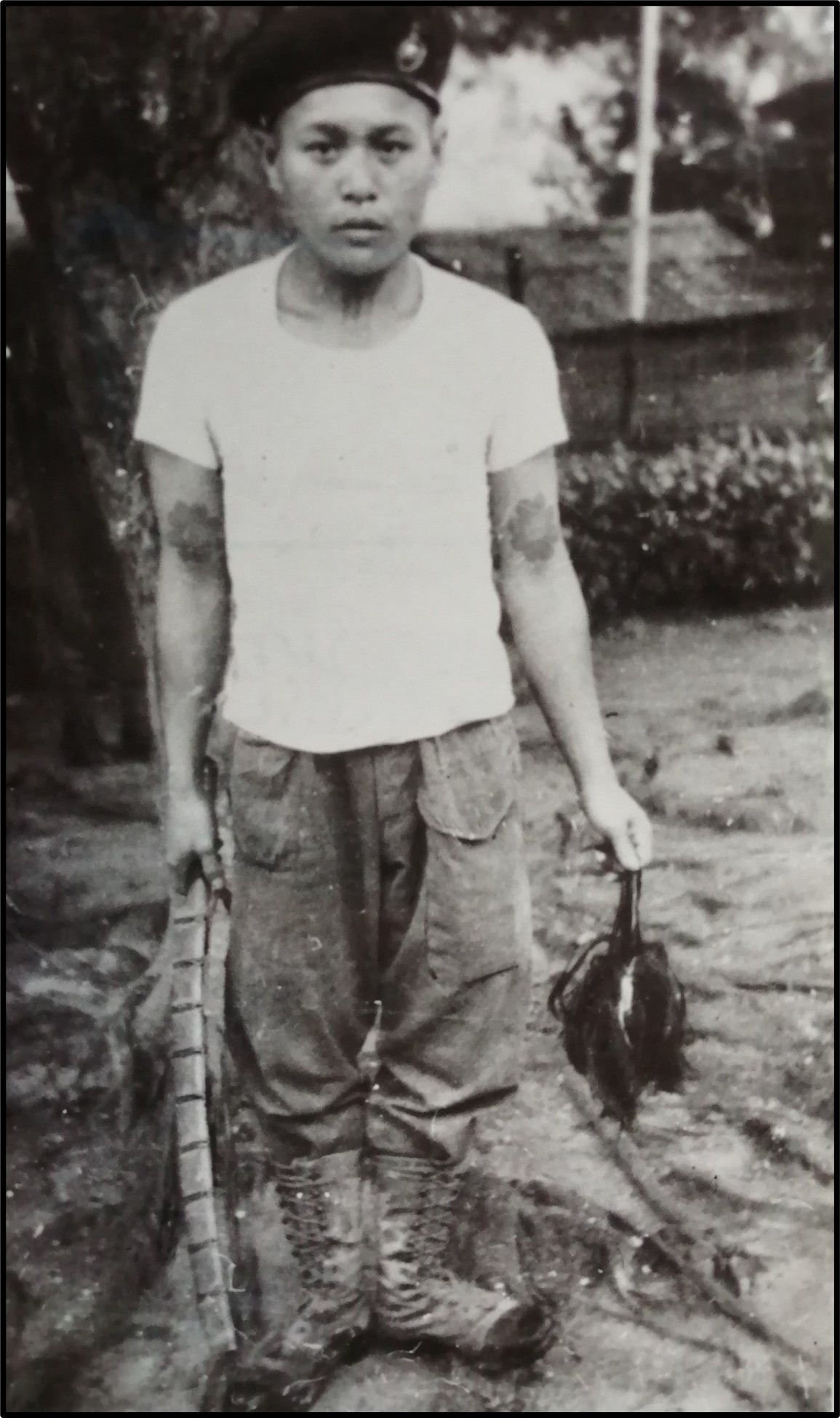
An Iban headhunter posing with a human scalp

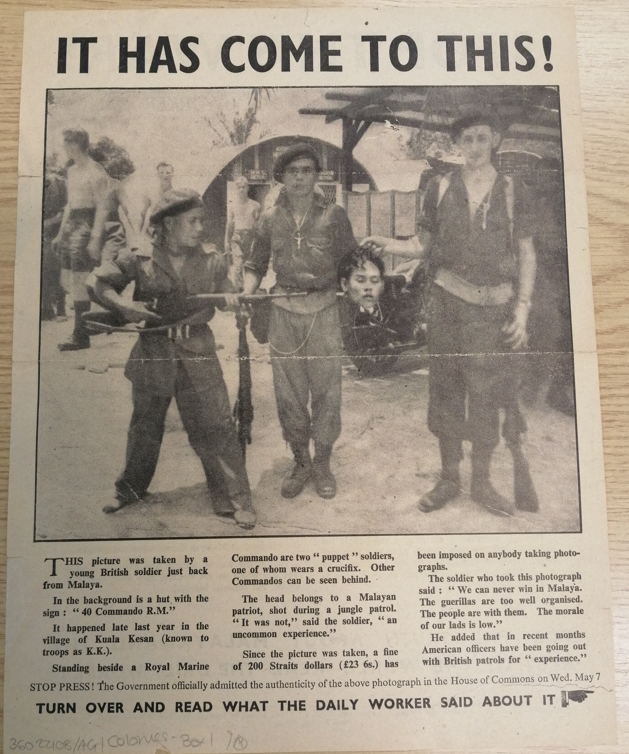
Double sided anti-colonial leaflet published during the British-Malayan Headhunting Scandal.

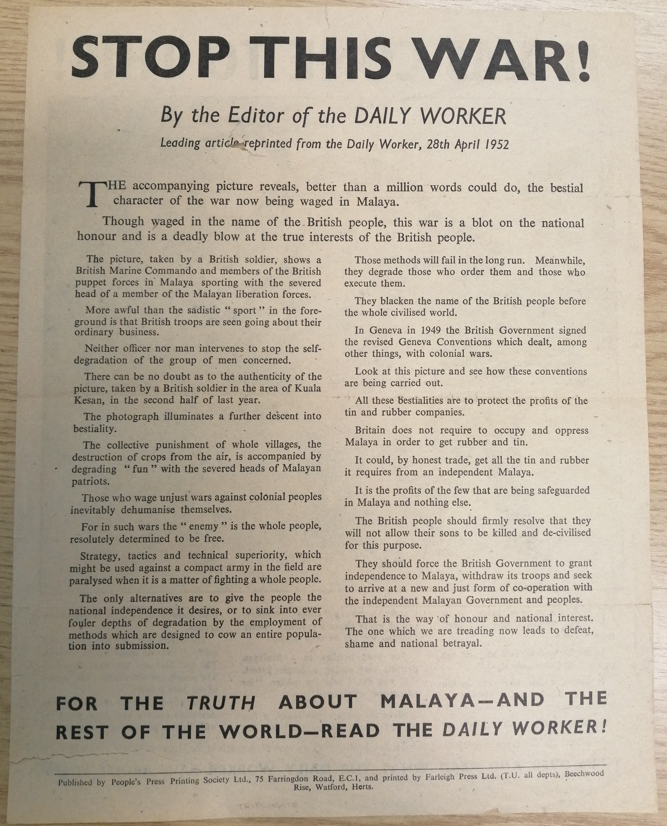
Double sided anti-colonial leaflet published during the British-Malayan Headhunting Scandal.

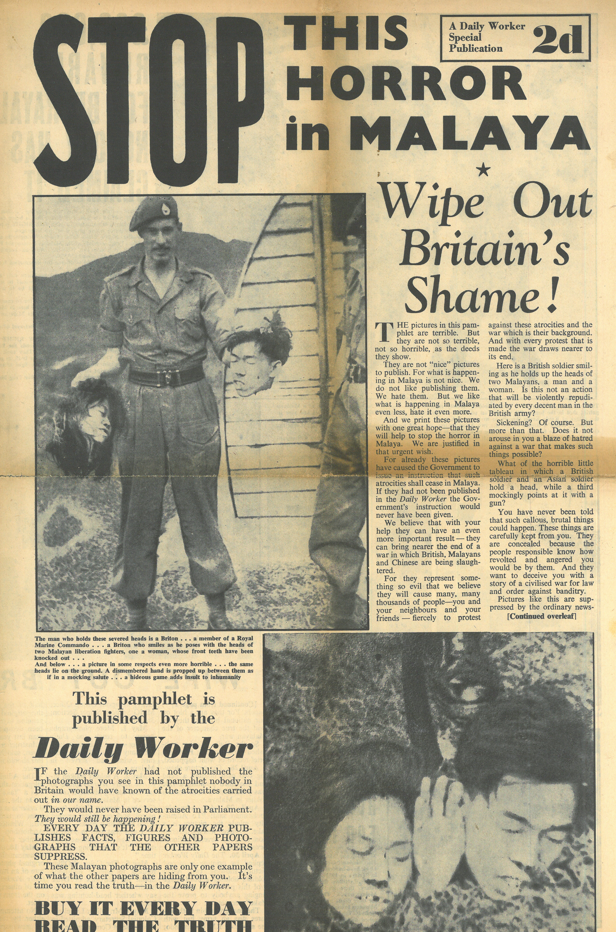
Stop This Horror in Malaya. This 4 page anti-colonial leaflet was published during the British-Malayan Headhunting Scandal.

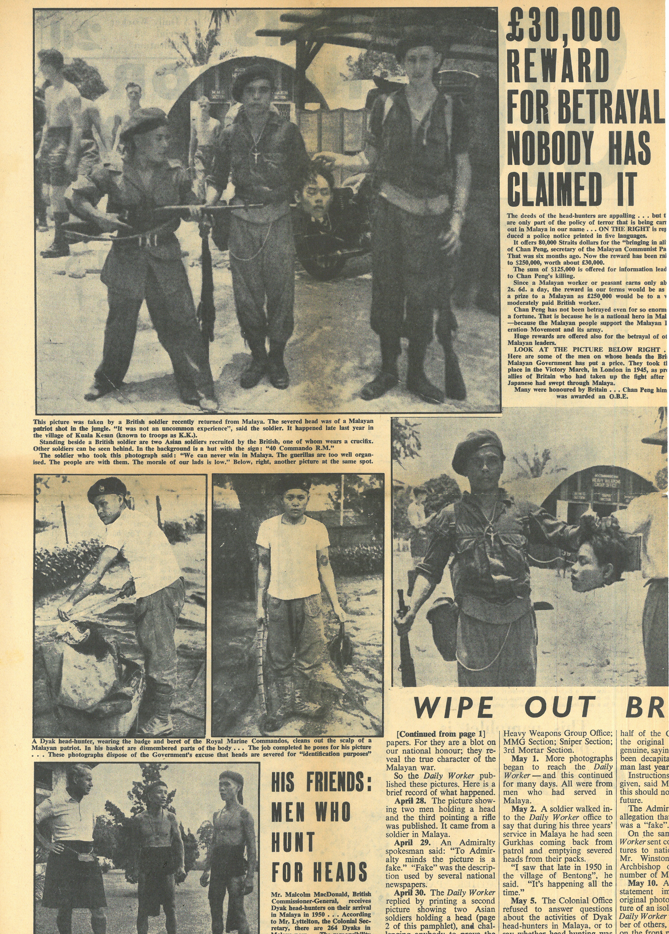
Stop This Horror in Malaya. Page 2/4

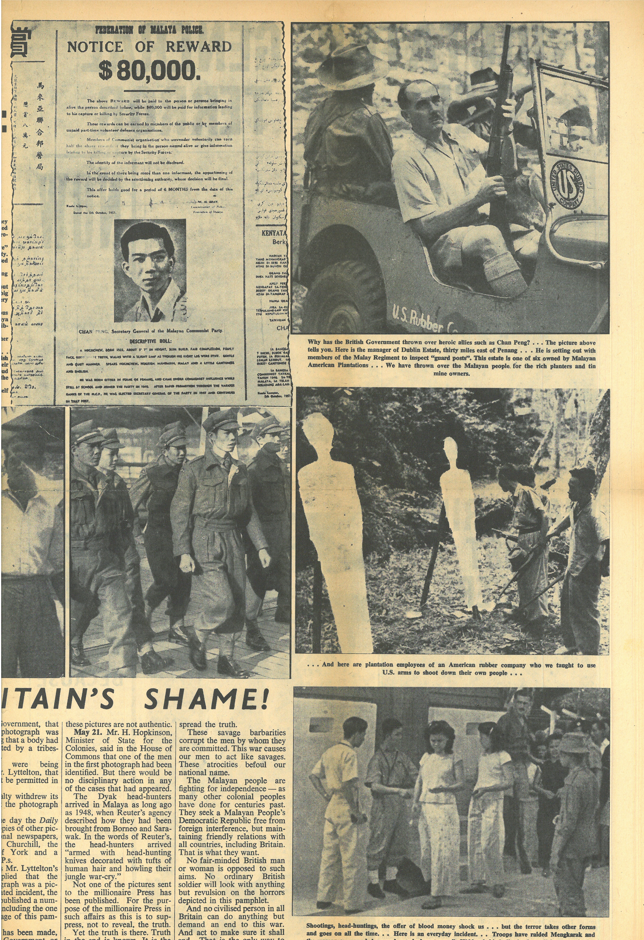
Stop This Horror in Malaya. Page 3/4

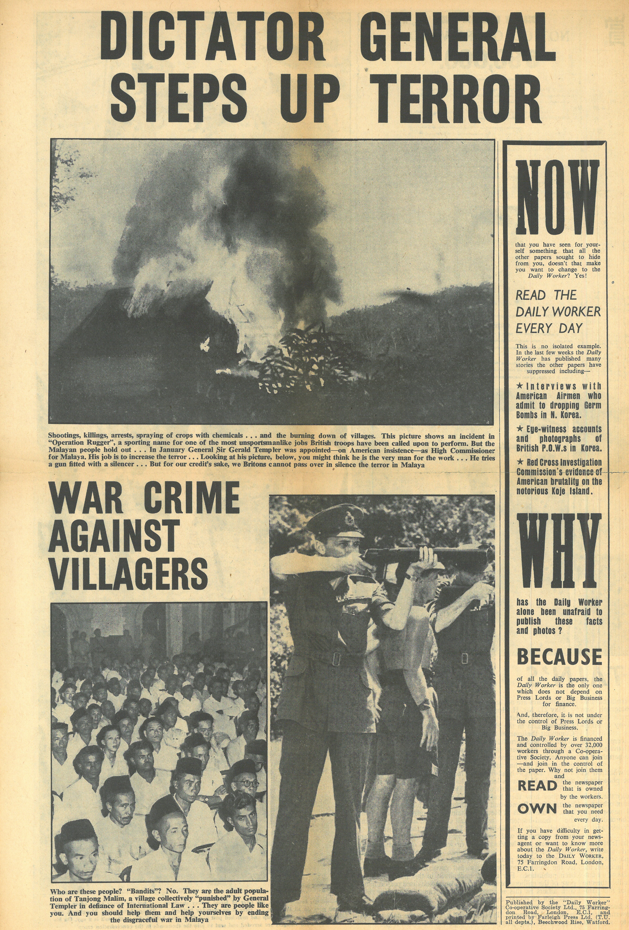
Stop This Horror in Malaya. Page 4/4

== Government response ==
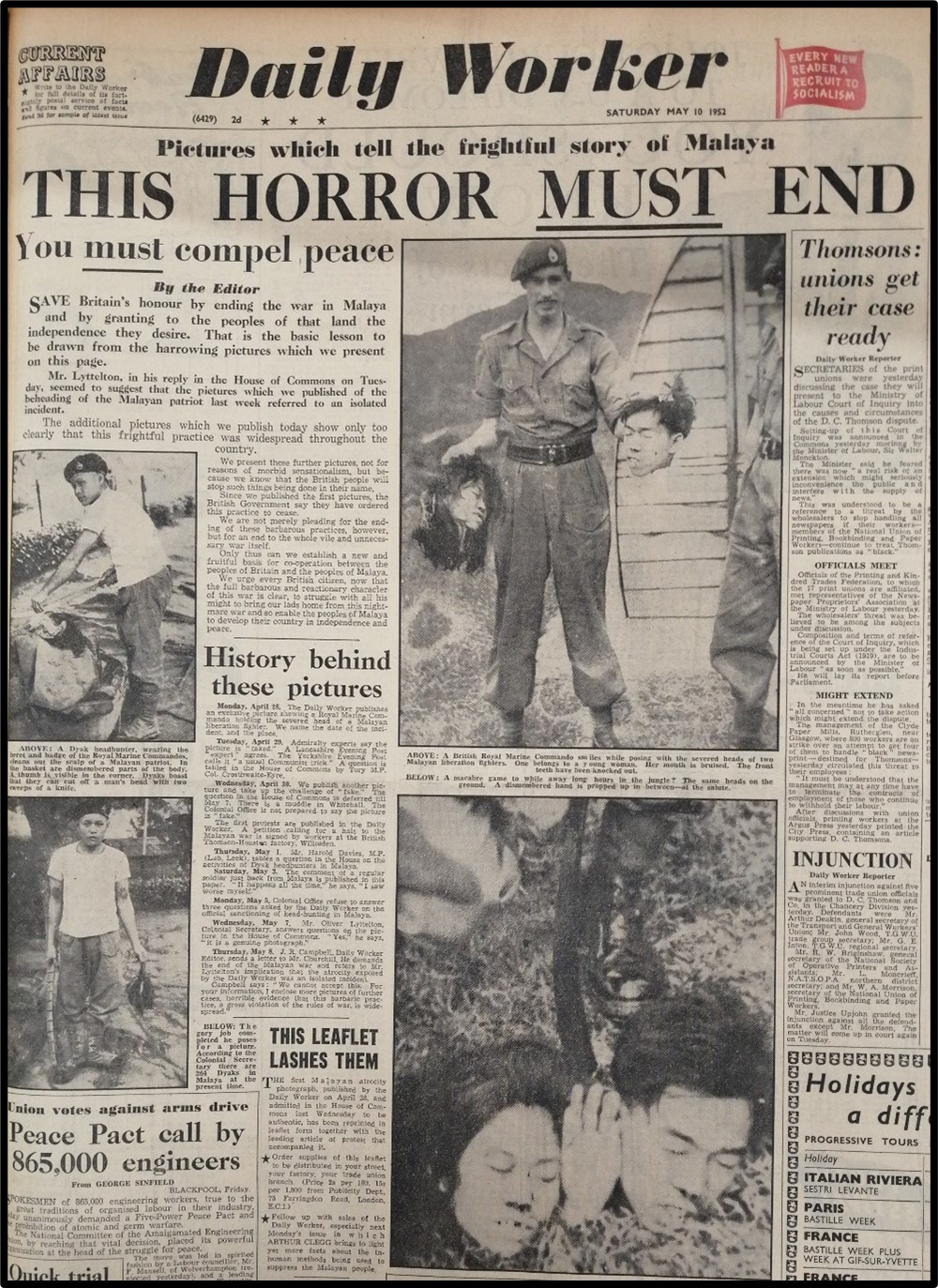
A set of Daily Worker headhunting/scalping photographs published on the 10 May 1952. These images had days prior been sent to Winston Churchill by J.R. Campbell

The British government and military initially denied that the Daily Worker's first headhunting photograph was genuine. The Daily Worker responded by publishing another photograph of the same incident and multiple eyewitness testimonies from British soldiers who witnessed British and Commonwealth troops collecting the heads and scalps of their enemies as trophies. Later they published a number of new headhunting photographs. This led the British colonial secretary Oliver Lyttelton to openly confess in the House of Commons that the Daily Worker's headhunting photographs were genuine.

The issue of the photographs was raised in the House of Commons multiple times, until 21 May 1952 when the British government declared that no British troops would be punished. Privately commenting on the Daily Worker photographs, the Colonial Office noted that "there is no doubt that under international law a similar case in wartime would be a war crime".

=== Winston Churchill's response ===
In response to the scandal, Prime Minister Winston Churchill (serving his second term, 1951–1955) and his cabinet agreed to order British forces to stop the practice of decapitating guerrillas in Malaya. Churchill's order was widely ignored by British troops, who continued to decapitate corpses.

=== Final mention in Parliament ===
On 21 May 1952, headhunting by British forces and their allies in Malaya was mentioned in parliament for a final time. In the House of Commons, Labour Party MP Michael Stewart asked the Minister of State for Colonial Affairs, Henry Hopkinson, if the British government intended to punish soldiers posing for photographs with decapitated human heads. Hopkinson confirmed that none of the British soldiers would be punished, claiming that said soldiers had never explicitly been forbidden from mutilating corpses.

== Media response to the scandal ==
The scandal was largely ignored by British newspapers, and historians have noted that the Daily Worker was the only British newspaper to republish the decapitation photographs.

The scandal received more attention in many foreign publications. The Soviet newspaper Pravda, and the Soviet English-language journal New Times, both reported and commented on the headhunting scandal. Many Chinese outlets also reported British headhunting in Malaya following the Daily Worker articles, including the Shanghai edition of Ta Kung Pao, the English language publication China Monthly Review, and the New China News Agency.

In the United States, once it was announced that the British government had ordered British soldiers to halt the practice of headhunting, the practice was briefly mentioned in The Washington Post. The American communist newspaper the Daily Worker (not to be confused with the British newspaper of the same name) was the only newspaper in America to denounce the British military's use of headhunting in Malaya, comparing such atrocities to ones committed by the Nazis. In the weeks following the Daily Worker's leaking of headhunting images, the practice of headhunting by British troops was briefly mentioned in small print in Singapore and Malaya, in publications such as The Straits Times, Singapore Standard, and the Singapore Free Press.

== Trade unions and protests ==
During the scandal, many British trade unions publicly condemned the British military and their practice of headhunting in Malaya, comparing the British military's actions to atrocities committed by the Nazis during WWII. Workers of the Thomas-Housten factory in Willesden circulated a petition denouncing British headhunting in Malaya. Similar denounciations of headhunting and other atrocities committed by the British military in Malaya came from Shoreditch Trades Council, workers at Ambrose Shardlow and Co, unionised workers in Gateshead, Southend-on-Sea, London's docklands, and branches of the Electrical Trades Union and Union of Shop, Distributive and Allied Workers.

The scandal motivated trade unionist Betty Tebbs and her husband to leave the Labour Party and join the Communist Party of Great Britain. The trade unionist Arthur Clegg also wrote in the Daily Worker of his disgust at the British military's practice of headhunting in Malaya, and compared anti-colonial guerrillas in Malaya to the Tolpuddle Martyrs.

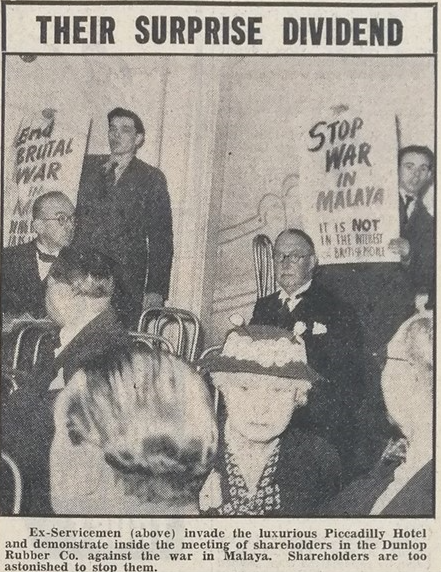
British military veterans crash the 1952 annual Dunlop shareholders meeting

On the 9 June 1952, ten British military veterans gatecrashed the annual shareholders meeting of Dunlop Rubber to protest against British military atrocities in Malaya. Dunlop's board of directors were present, as well as the company director Clive Baillieu. Protesters threw copies of the Daily Worker headhunting photographs across the room and unfurled anti-war posters.

== Scandal Timeline ==
The timeline was as follows:
April 1952

- 28 April: The Daily Worker publishes their frontpage article "This is the war in Malaya" showing British Royal Marines of the 40 Commando posing with a severed head of a person they killed in Malaya (modern Malaysia).
- 29 April: A spokesperson for the Royal Navy claims the photograph is fake. Behind the scenes British agents had already identified both the photographer and the man in the photograph holding the head.
- 30 April: The Daily Worker responds to claims their photograph is fake by publishing a second photograph of the same incident.

May 1952

- 6 May: British officials deny requests by the Daily Worker to comment on the authenticity of their headhunting photographs.
- 7 May: Colonial secretary Oliver Lyttelton confirms in the House of Commons that the Daily Worker photographs are genuine.
- 8 May: The Daily Worker's editor J.R. Campbell sends photographs of headhunting and scalping by British forces and their allies in Malaya to Winston Churchill, religious leaders, politicians, and newspaper editors.
- 10 May: The Daily Worker publishes 4 new headhunting photographs depicting a Royal Marine posing with two severed heads and an Iban headhunter wearing a Royal Marine beret preparing a scalp above baskets of human limbs. These images are described as some of the most graphically violent images of the war ever published.
- 21 May: British government declares it will not punish British soldiers who partook in headhunting in Malaya.

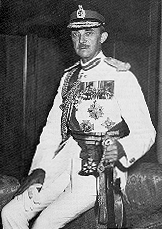
Sir Gerald Templer was the British general who allowed and encouraged his troops to decapitate suspected MNLA members

== Comments by historians and academics ==
Karl Hack, a history professor and expert on the Malayan Emergency, wrote about the scandal in a section of his 2021 book The Malayan Emergency: Revolution and Counterinsurgency at the End of Empire.

Erik Linstrum, a history professor and expert on media in the British Empire, used the Daily Worker headhunting scandal as a case study in his 2017 research into British media and Britain's post-WWII counterinsurgencies.

Simon Harrison, a University of Ulster professor of Anthropology, approached the scandal from an anthropological viewpoint in his 2012 book Dark Trophies.

In his 2019 book Arc of Containment, Wen-Qing Ngoei, a history professor at Singapore Management University, attributed the relative lack of public reaction to the revelations of British headhunting to racism, describing Lyttleton's public relations spin as successfully "drowning popular aversion to beheading communists with yellow faces".

In 2023, researcher Dan Poole published a comprehensive history of the scandal, titled Head Hunters in the Malayan Emergency: The Atrocity and Cover-up.

== Legacy and culture ==
- In 1952 the poet Randall Swingler wrote a poem titled "The Ballad of Herod Templer" mocking Gerald Templer. The poem is believed to have been inspired by the British-Malayan headhunting scandal.

== See also ==
- Anti-communist mass killings
- British war crimes
- Malayan Emergency
