= Woodrow Wyatt =

British politician, author, journalist and broadcaster

The Right Honourable The Lord Wyatt of Weeford

Member of Parliament for Bosworth
- In office 8 October 1959 – 29 May 1970
- Preceded by: Arthur Allen
- Succeeded by: Adam Butler

Member of Parliament for Birmingham Aston
- In office 5 July 1945 – 6 May 1955
- Preceded by: Redvers Prior
- Succeeded by: Julius Silverman

Personal details
- Born: Woodrow Lyle Wyatt; 4 July 1918 Surrey, England
- Died: 7 December 1997 (aged 79) London, England
- Party: Labour
- Spouses: Susan Cox (divorced) Nora Robbins (divorced) Lady Moorea Hastings (m. 1957; div. 1966) Verushka Banszky von Ambroz (née Racz) (m. 1966)
- Children: Pericles Plantagenet James Casati Wyatt (by third wife Moorea Hastings); Petronella Aspasia Wyatt (by fourth wife Veronica Banszky von Ambroz)
- Education: Eastbourne College
- Alma mater: Worcester College, Oxford

Woodrow Lyle Wyatt, Baron Wyatt of Weeford (4 July 1918 – 7 December 1997) was a British politician, author, journalist and broadcaster, close to Queen Elizabeth the Queen Mother, Margaret Thatcher and Rupert Murdoch. For the last twenty years of his life, he was chairman of the state betting organisation The Tote.

== Early life: 1918−1945 ==
Born in Kingston upon Thames, southwest London, Wyatt was the second son of Robert Harvey Lyle Wyatt, the founder and headmaster of Milbourne Lodge School, Esher, and his wife Ethel (née Morgan). Born on America's Independence Day, he was named after the American President Woodrow Wilson.

Wyatt was educated at Eastbourne College and Worcester College, Oxford, where he read jurisprudence and graduated with a second-class degree in 1939. He volunteered for military service ten days before the outbreak of the Second World War with the Suffolk Regiment and rose to the rank of major. Wyatt was posted to Normandy on D-Day plus one and was mentioned in despatches.

He was nearly court-martialled after an acrimonious exchange with one of his senior officers. Wyatt was afterwards posted to India.

Wyatt edited ten volumes of English Story (1940–50).

== Member of Parliament: 1945–1955 ==
Wyatt was elected to Parliament in 1945 as the Labour MP for Birmingham Aston, and retained the seat until the 1955 general election.

During the Cabinet Mission to India in 1946 he served as an informal liaison officer between the mission and the Muslim League. Wyatt was a member of the 15-strong Keep Left group of Labour MPs. In the group's pamphlet, published in May 1947, he criticised the government's failure to demobilise the armed forces quickly enough. In 1950, Wyatt visited Israel. He praised Israel for its "democratic socialism", which he believed was inspired by "the achievements of British socialism." Wyatt regretted Ernest Bevin's "prejudice against Zionism", because "Israel might easily have been a member state of the British Commonwealth" had it not been for the conflict over Palestine. Had Israel been part of the Commonwealth, Wyatt said "action might have been taken in time to prevent the loss of Abadan oil."

Clement Attlee appointed Wyatt Under-Secretary at the War Office in April 1951, an office he held for six months until Labour was defeated in the October 1951 election.

He published Into the Dangerous World in 1952. Following the splitting of his Aston constituency, Wyatt was unable to find a more promising option than the Conservative-held Grantham constituency, which he nonetheless fought in 1955, being defeated by 2,375 votes. By coincidence, Grantham was the home town of his latter-day friend Margaret Thatcher.

== Journalism: 1955–1959 ==
Edward R. Murrow of CBS chose Grantham as one of the seats that he would cover during the 1955 election. Grace Wyndham Goldie, who was the head of the BBC's Current Affairs department, happened to watch the broadcast and was impressed with Wyatt. She asked Wyatt to join Richard Dimbleby in presenting Panorama as the programme's foreign affairs reporter. He later wrote: "My TV appearances catapulted me into fame. ... We had an audience of between 9 and 14 million. When I walked in the street or went into any public place I was recognized and my autograph sought".

In February 1956, during the filming of a Panorama programme in Algeria, Wyatt and his television crew were attacked by French settlers who had mistaken them for Americans.

In April 1956 Bill Carron, a member of the executive of the Amalgamated Engineering Union (AEU), informed Wyatt that Communists were trying to take over the union by falsifying votes for union officials. There were upcoming elections for two posts on the Executive and as the Communists already held three out of the seven seats, there was a possibility of a Communist majority. Wyatt later wrote: "The threat to the economy and to the Labour Party of a huge AEU block vote supporting extremist policies at Labour conferences, was obvious". The Director-General of the BBC, Sir Ian Jacob, authorised Wyatt to produce a Panorama programme on it, which was broadcast on 14 May 1956. Wyatt later claimed that his programme "shook the union world. The voting went up by 40 per cent. ... it was enough to defeat the Communist candidates for all three posts. The AEU was saved".

In September 1956 he wrote a series of articles in the Illustrated about the Communist threat to the trade unions and therefore, due to the influential trade union block vote, to the Labour Party. These were republished in pamphlet-form as The Peril in Our Midst. In October 1956 he signed a statement urging British participation in the Common Market.

In June 1957 Wyatt visited South Africa under apartheid for Panorama. He later wrote that the treatment of black South Africans was "worse than that of slaves in Ancient Athens or Rome" and that his programme was "the first time that millions in Britain got a glimpse of what life was really like in South Africa: paradise under a live volcano". Eric Louw, the South African Minister of External Affairs, made an official complaint to the British government about Wyatt's programme.

After Wyatt's programme on Communist vote-rigging in the AEU, Jock Byrne gave Wyatt documents containing evidence that since the war Communists had controlled the Electrical Trades Union (ETU) by falsifying votes. Wyatt received the permission of Ian Jacob to make a Panorama programme on union democracy in the ETU. This was broadcast on 9 December 1957 and Wyatt brought to light that Les Cannon had been defrauded of his election to the ETU's Executive by Communist vote-rigging. As union rules prohibited union members from discussing union affairs in public, ETU members on Wyatt's programme had their faces hidden. In January 1958 Wyatt wrote an article on the subject for the New Statesman. In July 1961, Justice Win of the High Court declared that the 1959 election for the ETU's general secretary was fraudulently won by the Communist Frank Haxell and that Byrne was the general secretary.

Wyatt campaigned in favour of compulsory secret ballots for union elections, which was eventually embodied in the Employment Act 1988.

In January 1958 the National Executive Committee of the Labour Party rejected a request from the Holborn and St Pancras constituency Labour Party that Wyatt should be removed from the list of prospective parliamentary candidates due to his "anti-working class activity".

Wyatt was a close figure within the Information Research Department (IRD), a secret branch of the Foreign Office dedicated to publishing misinformation, pro-colonial, and anti-communist propaganda. The IRD used bribes to convince Wyatt to publish anti-communist propaganda, which the IRD would boost by using British diplomatic missions for distribution. Due to his role as a prime outlet for IRD propaganda, Wyatt is of interest to historians studying the Cold War and British propaganda.

== Member of Parliament: 1959–1970 ==
He returned to Parliament in 1959 as member for Bosworth, Leicestershire. According to Wyatt, Gaitskell told him that the Opposition Chief Whip, Bert Bowden, vetoed his appointment to Gaitskell's Shadow Cabinet.

In a speech to the Hinckley branch of the AEU in June 1960, Wyatt called the General Secretary of the Transport and General Workers' Union, Frank Cousins, "the bully with the block vote". After Labour's fourth successive electoral defeat in 1992, Anthony Howard said that Labour's own polling evidence suggested that Labour could not win another election so long as it was identified with the trade unions: "Woodrow Wyatt's description of the late Frank Cousins...as "the bully with the block vote" was not just a damaging phrase: in the electorate's perception of Labour it lit a candle that has never really gone out".

In November 1961, Wyatt wrote an article for The Guardian and delivered a speech in Leicester, both times advocating a Lib–Lab pact to keep the Conservatives out of power. According to Wyatt, a furious Gaitskell telephoned him, saying: "Why don't you get out of the Party and stop embarrassing me?" In January 1962, after Wyatt repeated this idea in an article for the New Statesman, Gaitskell delivered a speech to the Bosworth Labour Party (in Wyatt's presence) rejecting it. The General Secretary of the Labour Party, Morgan Phillips, wrote to Wyatt, warning him that unless he dropped his advocacy for a Lib−Lab pact, he would be expelled from the party. Wyatt acquiesced.

He was seen by some as a maverick and by others as a man of firm convictions which made him temperamentally unsuited to 'toeing the party line'. He rebelled in the 1964–1970 parliaments over the re-nationalisation of the steel industry. His thirteen interviews with Bertrand Russell were published as Bertrand Russell Speaks His Mind in 1960. Wyatt was defeated at the 1970 general election.

== Journalism and The Tote: 1970–1997 ==
After ceasing to be an active politician, Wyatt was appointed by the Home Secretary, Roy Jenkins, as Chairman of the Horserace Totalisator Board, a post he held from 1976 to 1997. At first he was an active chairman, rooting out corruption, but was later seen as complacent and considered to have allowed the Tote to stagnate. According to John McCririck: "The Tote had been bankrupt and he turned it round. He made it a force in betting. When he became chairman, the Tote was a total mess but he put it on the map by his sheer personality and flair along with the introduction of computerisation". However, a House of Commons Home Affairs Select Committee produced a report critical of Wyatt.

Wyatt was a prolific journalist, with a diverse range of interests, and by the late 1970s he had crossed the political spectrum and became an admirer of Margaret Thatcher. After Thatcher's election as Conservative leader in 1975, she arranged a meeting with Wyatt. He later wrote: "She won me over. The strength of her determination and the simplicity of her rational ideas uncluttered by intellectual confusion convinced me that she was the first party leader I had met, apart from Gaitskell, who might check Britain's slide and possibly begin to reverse it. She did not seem much like a Tory but she had the Tory Party to work for her, which was a useful start".

In July 1979, Roy Jenkins recorded in his diary after meeting Wyatt and Thatcher: "Woodrow is on very close terms with her, talks freely, easily, without self-consciousness, says anything he wants to". Wyatt would usually ring Thatcher after midnight or on Sunday mornings where he would give her advice. According to John Campbell, Thatcher did not always accept Wyatt's advice but "her ministers got sick of being told what 'Woodrow says' about this or that policy". He claims that when Geoffrey Howe complained in his memoirs that Thatcher preferred to listen to her private "voices" rather than to her colleagues and official advisers, "it was first and foremost of Wyatt that he was thinking".

During this period his News of the World column, 'The Voice of Reason', was regularly attacked by Thatcher's political opponents. His column reached an audience of approximately seventeen million readers. During this time he was vocal in opposing sanctions against apartheid South Africa, writing that Nelson Mandela and the ANC were trying to establish "a communist-style black dictatorship". Wyatt visited South Africa in 1986 and during a visit to a game reserve he saw black and white children playing together, leading him to remark: "They are comrades. Oh, if the rest of South Africa could be like that". He also interviewed President Botha and put to him that he should unban the ANC.

He was knighted in 1983 and was created a life peer on 3 February 1987 with the title Baron Wyatt of Weeford, of Weeford in the County of Staffordshire. The Wyatt family had lived at Weeford in the seventeenth century. Having long since parted from the Labour Party, he sat on the crossbenches.

His autobiography, Confessions of an Optimist, was published in 1985.

In the mid-1980s he played a key role as Rupert Murdoch's fixer in brokering negotiations with the electricians' union, aiding News International to move to Wapping. He set up a newspaper and printing business with his third wife, which soon failed. On 31 August 1986 the Press Council censured Wyatt for an article he wrote in his "Voice of Reason" column. Wyatt said that although Britain's Asian and black population were "generally well behaved", a substantial part of the latter were "lawless, drug-taking, violent and unemployable".

After Thatcher's fall in 1990, Wyatt supported John Major. However, he temporarily dropped his support for Major after he sacked his Chancellor, Norman Lamont, in 1993. Wyatt helped Lamont write his resignation speech.

In 2000, the journalist Petronella Wyatt, his daughter by his fourth marriage, published a book entitled Father, Dear Father: Life with Woodrow Wyatt.

== The Journals ==
Wyatt's diary cover (published posthumously as The Journals of Woodrow Wyatt by Macmillan, edited by Sarah Curtis)

Wyatt's caustic, candid and mischievously indiscreet diaries were published posthumously in three volumes as The Journals of Woodrow Wyatt by Macmillan and edited by Sarah Curtis. They are: Volume 1, 1985–88 (1998); Volume 2, Thatcher's Fall and Major's Rise, 1989–92, (1999); and Volume 3, From Major to Blair (2000), which spans the period from 1992 until three months before his death in December 1997.

Andrew Neil in the New Statesman wrote of the diaries: "Wyatt has done the country a service in giving us the unalloyed truth about how this country's governing and social elite still operates", and the Daily Express called the journals "The most explosive political memoirs of modern times". However, the historian Robert Rhodes James "advised caution in believing them: 'Even if the diarist is not attempting to give a deliberately false version, a talented writer can easily over-dramatise...' There is plenty of internal evidence that Wyatt should be approached with a similar caution." Lord Blake, the Tory historian, called Wyatt a "notorious liar".

Charles Moore, Thatcher's authorised biographer, claims Wyatt's journals "are a good source for the 'off duty' remarks and attitudes of many of the leading figures of the age, including Mrs Thatcher. They often reveal her private reactions to public events when she considered herself among friends".

== Personal life ==
Wyatt was married four times, to:

- First (div): Susan Cox, no issue. She was a fellow student at Oxford.
- Second (div): Nora Robbins, no issue. She was his secretary.
- Third (1957, dissolved 1966): Lady Moorea Hastings (1928–2011) daughter of the 16th Earl of Huntingdon and a granddaughter of Luisa Casati; one son: Hon. Pericles Plantagenet James Casati Wyatt.
- Fourth (1966): Veronica "Verushka" Banszky von Ambroz (née Racz), a Hungarian and widow of a surgeon; one daughter: journalist Petronella Wyatt (b. 1968).

He arranged for cousins to take care of his first child when his wife made it clear she was not interested in doing so. When they divorced, he was awarded custody of his son.

Wyatt leased for a time the 18th-century house known as Conock Old Manor, near Devizes in Wiltshire; he was living there in 1970.

Wyatt was a first cousin of England Test cricketer Bob Wyatt. He was a descendant of the architectural Wyatt family. He was first cousin to Honor Wyatt, the mother of musician Robert Wyatt, whose alliance with the Communist Party of Great Britain, juxtaposed with Woodrow Wyatt's right-wing politics, led to Robert Wyatt referring to his relative as an "appalling man with a sadistic sense of superiority".

He died in Camden, north London, on 7 December 1997 aged 79. He is buried in St Mary's churchyard in Weeford, just south of Lichfield, Staffordshire, where the Wyatt family originated.

== Arms ==
Coat of arms of Woodrow Wyatt
Crest Out of a Mural Coronet Argent a Demi Lion rampant Sable charged on the shoulder with an Estoile of the last and holding an Arrow point downwards proper Escutcheon Gules on a Fess Or between three Boars' Heads erased Argent two Lions passant Sable Supporters Dexter: a Boar Argent bristled hooved and tusked Or gorged with a Collar dancetty Gules; Sinister: a Lion Sable gorged with a Collar dancetty Gold Motto Vi Attamen Honore

== Works ==
- Into the Dangerous World (1952)
- Southwards from China: A Survey of South East Asia since 1945 (1952)
- The Peril in Our Midst (1956)
- Bertrand Russell speaks his Mind (1960)
- Turn Again, Westminster (1973)
- What's Left of the Labour Party? (1977)
- To The Point (1981)
- Confessions of an Optimist (1985)
- The Journals of Woodrow Wyatt. Volume One (1998)
- The Journals of Woodrow Wyatt. Volume Two: Thatcher's Fall and Major's Rise (1999)
- The Journals of Woodrow Wyatt. Volume Three: From Major to Blair (2000)

== Notes ==
Parliament of the United Kingdom
Preceded by Redvers Prior	Member of Parliament for Birmingham Aston; 1945–1955	Succeeded by Julius Silverman
Preceded by Arthur Allen	Member of Parliament for Bosworth; 1959–1970	Succeeded by Adam Butler
