= Frank Foulkes =

British trade union leader (1899–1980)

Frank Foulkes (31 March 1899 – 15 March 1980) was a British communist and trade union leader who was found guilty of rigging a union election.

== Biography ==
As a young man, Foulkes completed his apprenticeship to be an electrician and joined the Electrical Trades Union (ETU). In the 1920s he was active in the Labour Party; he worked as a party election agent in the 1929 UK general election. Soon after the election, however, he opted to leave Labour and join the Communist Party of Great Britain (CPGB).

Foulkes rose to prominence in the ETU, initially as a shop steward, then serving on branch and district committees before becoming a full-time union official in Merseyside. In 1942 he won election to be the union's National Organiser, a role where he exercised his negotiation skills. In 1946 he was elected ETU General President. In 1954 he led a major one-day electricians' strike. He also served as President of the Confederation of Shipbuilding and Engineering Unions in 1959–1960.

In 1959 the ETU's general secretary, Frank Haxell, also a CPGB member, narrowly won a bid for re-election against anti-communist activist Jock Byrne. Byrne and Frank Chapple took Haxell, Foulkes, and thirteen other communist union officials to court, alleging the election had been fixed. In 1961, Byrne won the case and was declared by the court to be the new general secretary, effective immediately. Foulkes argued that he had no knowledge of ballot rigging and should therefore retain his position. In a July 1962 trial before the ETU Executive Council, his argument was rejected on the grounds that, given his oversight role, he should have been aware of what was occurring. He was removed from office as General President. Since he was nearing his 65th birthday, he chose to retire early. The new union leadership announced that he had forfeited his pension benefit by refusing to admit guilt in the election scandal. Two years later it was reported that Foulkes was struggling financially without his ETU pension and had applied for National Assistance.

On 15 March 1980, Frank Foulkes died in Pendlebury, Greater Manchester, at age 80.

Trade union offices
Preceded by Edward Moore and R. Allan Robson	Auditor of the Trades Union Congress; 1942; With: Edward Moore	Succeeded by Position abolished
Preceded by Hugh Bolton	General President of the Electrical Trades Union; 1946–1962	Succeeded by Les Cannon
Preceded by Wilfred Beard	President of the Confederation of Shipbuilding and Engineering Unions; 1959–1960	Succeeded by Jim Matthews
