= Arthur Lummis Gibson =

Arthur Lummis Gibson (10 March 1899 – 17 February 1959) was a British politician and trade unionist, who served as Lord Mayor of Birmingham.

Born in Northwich, in Cheshire, Gibson was educated at Cheetham Secondary School and the Manchester High School of Commerce. He began working at the age of fourteen, initially for a silk wholesaler, but then as a clerk and typist for the Friendly Society of Ironfounders.

In 1929, Gibson moved to work for the National Union of Clerks and Administrative Workers (NUCAW), initially as its organiser for the Midlands. Under his leadership, membership in the region grew steadily, and by the end of World War II, he was supported by two members of staff. He represented the union at the Trades Union Congress (TUC) on several occasions, and served as Auditor of the TUC.

Gibson was elected as a Labour Party member of Birmingham City Council in 1945, representing Northfield. He was defeated in 1949, but won a seat in All Saints the following year, and in 1954 was made an alderman. He was regarded as being on the right wing of the party. From 1953 to 1955, he chaired the council's finance committee, and then in 1955–56, he served as Lord Mayor of Birmingham. During his time as Lord Mayor, he led a delegation to Sverdlovsk in the Soviet Union, and then entertained Khrushchev and Bulganin in Birmingham.

Gibson had a heart attack in late 1956, and took two years off work. He returned, but had a second heart attack in February 1959, and died soon after, aged 59.

Trade union offices
| Preceded by New position | Midlands Area Organiser of the Clerical and Administrative Workers' Union; 1929–1959 | Succeeded by Roy Grantham |
| Preceded by Bob Scouller and John Twomey | Auditor of the Trades Union Congress; 1931; With: John Twomey | Succeeded by Clement Stott and Thomas Trotter |
| Preceded by Clement Stott and Thomas Trotter | Auditor of the Trades Union Congress; 1933–1934; With: E. Irwin | Succeeded by Bernard Bagnari and G. Humphreys |
Civic offices
| Preceded by Joseph Reginald Balmer | Lord Mayor of Birmingham; 1955–1956 | Succeeded by Ernest William Apps |
