= Hugh Bolton (trade unionist) =

British trade unionist and politician

Hugh P. Bolton (died 1947) was a British trade union official who also served on the National Executive Committee of the Labour Party.

Bolton was born in Birmingham, but brought up in London. While he was named "Hugh", throughout his life, his close friends called him Ben Bolton. He became a telephone engineer, and joined the London West branch of the Electrical Trades Union. By 1914, he was serving on the union's London District Committee, but was expelled from the union in 1915 along with most of the committee's members, for sending circulars to union members without the permission of the national executive.

Bolton was soon readmitted to the union, and by 1919 he was a member of its executive committee. On the committee, he was known as a supporter of syndicalism, who often worked closely with Jock Muir. He resigned from the executive after a strike for shorter hours which he supported was ended by a vote of all the members, but he personally retained much support from members, and was persuaded to rescind his resignation.

In 1925, Bolton was elected as the union's full-time national organiser. He focused on recruitment, and his organising trips to the West Country in 1927, which succeeded in greatly increasing membership in Plymouth, were held up as an example to the whole union.

Bolton stood to become general secretary of the union in 1941, but took third place behind Ernest Bussey and Frank Foulkes, ahead of Walter Stevens and Paul McArdle. When Bussey won the run-off election, Bolton stood for the vacant position of general president, defeating Stevens by 12,854 votes to 8,772. He was the first person to hold the post on a full-time basis. His opponents claimed that he had underestimated his age by one year, in order to qualify to run in the election, but this was never proven.

As general president, Bolton began suffering from poor health. He was elected to the National Executive Committee of the Labour Party in 1944, but was unable to attend any meetings, due to his health. He retired in late 1945, shortly after the end of World War II. He died two years later.

Trade union offices
Preceded by Samuel Lomax and John Twomey	Auditor of the Trades Union Congress; 1926; With: John Twomey	Succeeded by Bob Scouller and John Twomey
Preceded by Ernest Bussey	General President of the Electrical Trades Union; 1941–1945	Succeeded by Frank Foulkes
