= Frank Haxell =

British trade union leader (1912–1988)

Frank Leslie Haxell (25 June 1912 – 26 May 1988) was a British communist activist and trade union leader. He was found guilty of rigging a union election.

== Career ==
Born in Islington, Haxell apprenticed as an electrician. While still a teenager in 1929, he joined the Electrical Trades Union (ETU). In 1935 he became a member of the Communist Party of Great Britain (CPGB). A militant union activist, Haxell supported an unauthorised strike in Chorley, Lancashire in 1939. As punishment for his action, he was banned from holding office in the ETU for five years.

In 1948, Haxell was elected the ETU's assistant general secretary. He was instrumental in a successful 1950-51 campaign to prevent a wage freeze for electricians. After the ETU general secretary Walter Stevens died in 1954, Haxell stood in the election for the post and defeated Jock Byrne. In a speech at the CPGB's 25th Congress in April 1957, Haxell warned of the danger of co-option when unions are too closely affiliated with their corporate employers: "It is necessary to recognise that when trade unions become part of management they become committed by the decisions taken and to that extent lose their independence and freedom of action."

Under Haxell's leadership, the ETU was accused of election vote-rigging and other corrupt practices. Les Cannon was a key figure in the effort to unmask corruption inside the union. Cannon had been a CPGB member who dropped out after the 1956 Soviet invasion of Hungary. He worked with Labour Party MPs John Freeman and Woodrow Wyatt to change ETU's leadership. In the late 1950s, the communist-controlled union was a target of public criticism and of British press and TV investigations.

By 1959, the ETU had become a sizable union with an estimated 240,000 members. Haxell was re-elected general secretary that year, in an election that Byrne was widely expected to win. Byrne and Frank Chapple claimed the election was fixed and took Haxell to court, along with president Frank Foulkes and fourteen other ETU officials. Byrne and Chapple won the case in June 1961. The presiding justice ruled that a group of communist union officials "had conspired together to prevent by fraudulent and unlawful devices" the election of a non-communist general secretary to replace Haxell. The court appointed Byrne the new general secretary with immediate effect. In the aftermath, Haxell was expelled from the union. He was also forced to resign from the CPGB "for bringing it into disrepute by condoning 'illegal and undemocratic methods'." He returned to working as an electrician, and was later permitted to rejoin the union, but not to hold office in it.

== Personal life ==
Haxell married Queenie Catherine Knowles in Islington in 1935. They had two children. In 1968 she divorced him on the grounds of adultery.

Frank Haxell died in London on 26 May 1988. He was 75.

Trade union offices
Preceded by Walter Stevens	Assistant General Secretary of the Electrical Trades Union; 1948 – 1955	Succeeded by Robert G. Maclennan
Preceded by Walter Stevens	General Secretary of the Electrical Trades Union; 1955 – 1961	Succeeded by Jock Byrne
