= Alfred Ewer =

British trade unionist (1867–1935)

Alfred Ewer (1 May 1867 – 1935) was a British trade unionist.

Ewer was born to Frederick Edward and Elizabeth Ewer in Brighton, where he was baptised at St Nicholas Church in October 1867. By 1891, he was working for the National Telephone Company. Conditions at that branch of the company were worse than elsewhere, so Ewer wrote to Arthur Walker of the Electrical Trades Union (ETU) to ask for help. Walker persuaded him to join the union, and Ewer recruited most of his colleagues, heading a branch of around 30 members.

Walker attempted to negotiate with the National Telephone Company regarding conditions in Brighton, but could not make any progress, so the ETU called a strike. Initially, it seemed the trade unionists had a strong position, but after five weeks, it fell apart, and Ewer was one of only six members still on strike; they were all dismissed. The ETU helped Ewer find alternative employment, and he remained active in the union.

In 1900, Francis Sims, the general secretary of the ETU, resigned after having been caught embezzling funds, and was later sentenced to six months in prison. Ewer stood in the election to replace him and won. Initially, he had little impact, and the union faced a challenge from a breakaway union which Sims attempted to found, but that was dissolved in 1903, and the appointment of Jimmy Rowan as national organiser helped increase membership from 1,000 to 1,500 by 1907.

By 1907, Ewer was in conflict with the Manchester branch of the union, which won a vote to relocate the national office to their city. The branch also objected to Ewer being paid a bonus of £1 for editing each issue of the union journal, Eltradion.

On 1 May 1907, Ewer disappeared, his wife and friends not knowing where he was. It was later discovered that he had emigrated to Australia, and had stolen £144 of union money, making him the third general secretary in a row to embezzle union funds.

He died in 1935 in New South Wales.

Trade union offices
Preceded by Francis Sims	General Secretary of the Electrical Trades Union; 1900 – 1907	Succeeded by Jimmy Rowan
