= Haxell =

Haxell is a surname. Notable people with the surname include:

- Frank Haxell (1912–1988), British trade unionist and communist activist
- Penny Haxell, Canadian mathematician
