= Linstrum =

Linstrum is a surname. Notable people with the surname include:

- Catherine Linstrum (fl. early 21st century), British writer and film director
- Erik Linstrum (fl. early 21st century), American historian
