= Eric Hammond =

General secretary of the EETPU (1984-92)

Eric Albert Barrett Hammond, OBE (17 July 1929 – 30 May 2009) was general secretary of the EETPU, a British trade union, from 1984 to 1992.

Hammond was born in Northfleet, Kent, and was evacuated to Newfoundland, Canada during World War II, returning to the UK in 1945. He served his apprenticeship as an electrician with the Bowater paper company, and in 1950 was called up for national service, serving for two years with the Royal Electrical and Mechanical Engineers.

In 1947 he joined the Labour Party. Hammond, like his predecessors Leslie Cannon and Frank Chapple, ostensibly started his career on the Left, but, unlike them, was never an actual member of the Communist Party. In 1977 he was appointed an OBE.

In 1982 he was elected to succeed Chapple as general secretary of the EETPU, a post he occupied fully from 1984. Hammond opposed nearly everything in the tradition of conventional trade unionism, for which he was referred to as "right wing". The most famous example was "no strike" clauses. Eric Hammond and Arthur Scargill famously fell out at the 1984 TUC conference when he described the UK miners' strike (1984–85) as "lions led by donkeys". He refused to take the electricians in to the strike on the side of the miners, even though many of the union's members wanted to, and thus without the power of the electricians it is thought he prolonged the strike for many months.

He died on 30 May 2009, aged 79, after a lengthy illness. He was survived by his wife Brenda and their two sons.

== See also ==
- Electrical, Electronic, Telecommunications and Plumbing Union
- Wapping dispute

Trade union offices
| Preceded by Frank Chapple | General Secretary of the EETPU; 1984–1992 | Succeeded by Position abolished |
