= Bernard Bagnari =

British trade unionist and politician

Bernard Augustus Bagnari (1902–1987) was a British trade unionist and politician.

Bagnari was educated in London and in Rome, before becoming a clerk. In 1927, he joined the National Union of Clerks (NUC), and in 1938 he became its London Area Organiser, later being promoted to Area Secretary. He represented the Clerks at the Trades Union Congress (TUC), serving for a period as the TUC's auditor, and during World War II he was vice-chair of the TUC's committee for the mobilisation of labour in London and the South of England. He also worked for the Ministry of Information, and broadcast in Italian to the occupied countries.

Bagnari was a strong opponent of fascism, and by the end of World War II, he was also strongly opposed to communism. In 1946, he resigned as the NUC's area secretary, complaining that his work was hampered by communists in the union, and in 1955 he argued in favour of expelling former Revolutionary Communist Party members who had joined the Labour Party.

In 1945, Bagnari was elected to Islington Metropolitan Borough Council, representing Canonbury for the Labour Party, and at the 1949 London County Council election, he won a seat in Islington East. He stood for the Labour Party in Tonbridge at the 1951 United Kingdom general election, and in Putney at the 1955 United Kingdom general election, but was unsuccessful. He remained on the county council until its abolition in 1965.

Bagnari devoted more time to trade unionism from the mid-1950s, and from 1960 to 1965, he was the vice-president of the Clerical and Administrative Workers' Union, successor to the NUC. In 1965, he wrote to The Times, arguing that The Beatles should not have received government honours.

Trade union offices
Preceded by Arthur Lummis Gibson and E. Irwin	Auditor of the Trades Union Congress; 1935; With: G. Humphreys	Succeeded by Ernest Bussey and John H. Harrison
Preceded by Ernest Bussey and John H. Harrison	Auditor of the Trades Union Congress; 1937; With: Edward Moore	Succeeded by Edward Moore and Harry Nutt
