= Charles Lovell (trade unionist) =

British trade unionist

Charles Lovell (1923 – 13 October 2014) was a British trade unionist.

Born in Newcastle-upon-Tyne, Lovell left school in 1939 and began an apprenticeship as a plumber, also joining the Plumbing Trades Union (PTU). Soon after, he was drafted to work at the Swan Hunter Shipyard, but returned to plumbing immediately after World War II.

Lovell joined the Labour Party and was elected as a councillor, and also chaired Wallsend Trades Council. He was elected to his union's executive council in 1966, and two years later won election as its general secretary. He immediately led it into a merger with the Electrical Trades Union, becoming National Officer of the new Electrical, Electronic, Telecommunications and Plumbing Union. In this role, he created a national pension scheme for plumbers, and championed more flexible apprenticeships, which could be completed under a variety of employers.

Lovell retired in 1987, and was made an Officer of the Order of the British Empire. In his spare time, he learned Esperanto.

Trade union offices
Preceded by Hugh Kelly	General Secretary of the Plumbing Trades Union; 1968	Position abolished
New post	National Officer of the Electrical, Electronic, Telecommunications and Plumbing Union; 1968 – 1987	Succeeded by Bill Gannon
