= John Twomey (trade unionist) =

Welsh trade union leader

John Twomey (1866 – fl.1946), also known as Jack Twomey, was a Welsh trade union leader.

Born in Newport, in Wales, Twomey worked as a labourer, and was an early member of the National Amalgamated Labourers' Union (NALU); by 1891, he was a member of the union's executive committee. He was elected as the union's Newport District Secretary, serving full-time from 1901, and then in 1909 was elected as the union's general secretary, defeated J. Powlesland by 1,933 votes to 1,584.

Twomey was a supporter of the Labour Party, and, after several attempts, was elected in 1904 to represent the Central ward on Newport Council. He opposed World War I, and was a founder member of the National Council for Civil Liberties, chairing its 1916 conference opposing conscription.

Twomey was a strong supporter of adult education and, under his leadership, NALU instituted a scholarship to Ruskin College. He took part in union merger discussions which, in 1921, led NALU to become part of the Transport and General Workers' Union, and he served as its national organiser for general workers. From 1924 until 1931, he also served as an auditor of the Trades Union Congress.

In 1946, Twomey deposited his papers, which included many records of NALU, with the National Library of Wales.

Trade union offices
Preceded by Harry Williams	General Secretary of the National Amalgamated Labourers' Union; 1909–1921	Position abolished
Preceded by Herbert Elvin; Samuel Lomax	Auditor of the Trades Union Congress; 1924–1931; With: Herbert Elvin (1924); Samuel Lomax (1925); Hugh Bolton (1926); Bob Scouller (1927–1930); Arthur Lummis Gibson (1931)	Succeeded by Clement Stott; Thomas Trotter
