= Islington East (London County Council constituency) =

London County Council constituency

- Former constituency for the London County Council

Former constituency
- Created: 1889
- Abolished: 1965
- Member(s): 2 (to 1949); 3 (from 1949)

Islington East was a constituency used for elections to the London County Council between 1889 and the council's abolition, in 1965. The seat shared boundaries with the UK Parliament constituency of the same name.

== Councillors ==
Year	Name	Party	Name	Party	Name	Party
1889	Andrew Mitchell Torrance	Progressive	Charles Horsley	Moderate	Two seats until 1949	
1892	Andrew Mitchell Torrance	Progressive	James Galloway Weir	Progressive	Two seats until 1949	
1895	Andrew Mitchell Torrance	Progressive	James Laughland	Progressive	Two seats until 1949	
1904	Andrew Mitchell Torrance	Progressive	Arthur Augustus Thomas	Progressive	Two seats until 1949	
1907	Anderson Montague-Barlow	Municipal Reform	Philip Pilditch	Municipal Reform	Two seats until 1949	
1910	Edward Smallwood	Progressive	Arthur Augustus Thomas	Progressive	Two seats until 1949	
1913	Edward Smallwood	Progressive	William Lace Clague	Progressive	Two seats until 1949	
1917	Arthur Christopher Denham	Progressive	William Lace Clague	Progressive	Two seats until 1949	
1919	J. P. Blake	Progressive	William Lace Clague	Progressive	Two seats until 1949	
1925	Thelma Cazalet	Municipal Reform	Edward Cobb	Municipal Reform	Two seats until 1949	
1931	Charles Robertson	Labour	Edward Cobb	Municipal Reform	Two seats until 1949	
1934	Norman Hulbert	Municipal Reform	Guy Neumann	Municipal Reform	Two seats until 1949	
1937	Day Kimball	Municipal Reform	Ronald Storrs	Municipal Reform	Two seats until 1949	
1940	Leslie Walker	Municipal Reform	Ronald Storrs	Municipal Reform	Two seats until 1949	
1945	Leslie Walker	Municipal Reform	Hugh Quennell	Municipal Reform	Two seats until 1949	
1946	Edwin Bayliss	Labour	Irene Chaplin	Labour	Two seats until 1949	
1949	Edwin Bayliss	Labour	Irene Chaplin	Labour	Bernard Bagnari	Labour

== Election results ==
1889 London County Council election: Islington East
Party	Candidate	Votes	%	±%
Progressive	Andrew Mitchell Torrance	2,388		
Moderate	Charles Horsley	2,066		
Independent Liberal	Hugh Robert Taylor	512		
Independent Liberal	Thomas Francis Stonelake	371		
Social Democratic Federation	Amelia Varley	226		
Moderate	E. J. Wilson	223		
Progressive win (new seat)				
Moderate win (new seat)				

1892 London County Council election: Islington East
Party	Candidate	Votes	%	±%
Progressive	Andrew Mitchell Torrance	2,989		
Progressive	James Galloway Weir	2,857		
Moderate	William Thornthwaite	2,274		
Moderate	E. J. Wilson	2,223		
Progressive gain from Moderate		Swing		
Progressive hold		Swing		

1895 London County Council election: Islington East
Party	Candidate	Votes	%	±%
Progressive	Andrew Mitchell Torrance	2,863		
Progressive	James Laughland	2,791		
Moderate	H. Legge	2,539		
Moderate	J. Wilson	2,519		
Progressive hold		Swing		
Progressive hold		Swing		

1898 London County Council election: Islington East
Party	Candidate	Votes	%	±%
Progressive	Andrew Mitchell Torrance	3,015		
Progressive	James Laughland	2,717		
Conservative	George Frederick Lloyd Mortimer	2,495		
Conservative	Alt	2,306		
Progressive hold		Swing		
Progressive hold		Swing		

1901 London County Council election: Islington East
Party	Candidate	Votes	%	±%
Progressive	Andrew Mitchell Torrance	3,992	32.6	+4.0
Progressive	James Laughland	3,751	30.6	+4.8
Conservative	George Frederick Lloyd Mortimer	2,254	18.4	−5.3
Conservative	William Beale	2,249	18.4	−3.5
Progressive hold		Swing		
Progressive hold		Swing	+4.4	

1904 London County Council election: Islington East
Party	Candidate	Votes	%	±%
Progressive	Andrew Mitchell Torrance	4,413		
Progressive	Arthur Augustus Thomas	3,914		
Conservative	A. H. Caesar	2,416		
Majority				
Progressive hold		Swing		

1907 London County Council election: Islington East
Party	Candidate	Votes	%	±%
Municipal Reform	Anderson Montague-Barlow	4,430		
Municipal Reform	Philip Pilditch	4,402		
Progressive	Edward Smallwood	4,292		
Progressive	Arthur Augustus Thomas	4,257		
Majority				
Municipal Reform gain from Progressive		Swing		
Municipal Reform gain from Progressive		Swing		

1910 London County Council election: Islington East
Party	Candidate	Votes	%	±%
Progressive	Edward Smallwood	4,031	26.2	
Progressive	Arthur Augustus Thomas	3,949	25.7	
Municipal Reform	Charles Crole-Rees	3,715	24.2	
Municipal Reform	Percy Simner	3,685	24.0	
Majority				
Progressive gain from Municipal Reform		Swing		
Progressive gain from Municipal Reform		Swing		

1913 London County Council election: Islington East
Party	Candidate	Votes	%	±%
Progressive	Edward Smallwood	4,545	26.1	−0.1
Progressive	William Lace Clague	4,453	25.6	−0.1
Municipal Reform	David Hazel	4,226	24.3	+0.1
Municipal Reform	John Foster Vesey-FitzGerald	4,170	24.0	0.0
Majority		227	1.3	−0.2
Progressive hold		Swing	-0.1	

1919 London County Council election: Islington East
Party	Candidate	Votes	%	±%
Progressive	William Lace Clague	3,438	35.3	
Progressive	J. P. Blake	3,289	33.8	
Municipal Reform	George King Naylor	1,514	15.6	
Municipal Reform	Henry Myers	1,490	15.3	
Majority		1,775	18.2	
Progressive hold		Swing		
Progressive hold		Swing		

1922 London County Council election: Islington East
Party	Candidate	Votes	%	±%
Progressive	William Lace Clague	6,877	41.2	+5.9
Progressive	J. P. Blake	6,767	40.5	+6.7
Independent	George King Naylor	3,065	18.3	+2.7
Majority		3,702	22.2	
Progressive hold		Swing		
Progressive hold		Swing		

1925 London County Council election: Islington East
Party	Candidate	Votes	%	±%
Municipal Reform	Edward Cobb	4,914		
Municipal Reform	Thelma Cazalet	4,832		
Labour	W. Macrae Gibson	3,502		
Labour	S. Presbury	3,196		
Progressive	Frank Raffety	2,590		
Progressive	Frank Dilnot	2,505		
Majority				
Municipal Reform gain from Progressive		Swing		
Municipal Reform gain from Progressive		Swing		

1928 London County Council election: Islington East
Party	Candidate	Votes	%	±%
Municipal Reform	Edward Cobb	5,630		
Municipal Reform	Thelma Cazalet	5,549		
Liberal	William James Pincombe	3,671		
Liberal	William Nichols Marcy	3,665		
Labour	Santo Jeger	3,375		
Labour	Francis Douglas	3,326		
Majority				
Municipal Reform hold		Swing		
Municipal Reform hold		Swing		

1931 London County Council election: Islington East
Party	Candidate	Votes	%	±%
Municipal Reform	Edward Cobb	5,204		
Labour	Charles Robertson	3,897		
Labour	H. Sykes	3,825		
Municipal Reform	Eric Hall	3,746		
Independent	Sidney Charles Harper	2,603		
Majority				
Labour gain from Municipal Reform		Swing		
Municipal Reform hold		Swing		

1934 London County Council election: Islington East
Party	Candidate	Votes	%	±%
Municipal Reform	Norman Hulbert	6,172		
Municipal Reform	Guy Neumann	6,028		
Labour	Florence Harrison Bell	5,361		
Labour	Charles Robertson	5,319		
Majority				
Municipal Reform gain from Labour		Swing		
Municipal Reform hold		Swing		

1937 London County Council election: Islington East
Party	Candidate	Votes	%	±%
Municipal Reform	Day Kimball	8,833		
Municipal Reform	Ronald Storrs	8,656		
Labour	D. C. N. Moss	8,496		
Labour	Garry Allighan	8,479		
Majority				
Municipal Reform hold		Swing		
Municipal Reform hold		Swing		

1946 London County Council election: Islington East
Party	Candidate	Votes	%	±%
Labour	Edwin Bayliss	6,572		
Labour	Irene Marcousé	6,434		
Conservative	Lady Elveden	3,992		
Conservative	Hugh Quennell	3,954		
Majority				
Labour gain from Municipal Reform		Swing		
Labour gain from Municipal Reform		Swing		

1949 London County Council election: Islington East
Party	Candidate	Votes	%	±%
Labour	Edwin Bayliss	10,102		
Labour	Bernard Bagnari	9,798		
Labour	Irene Marcousé	9,757		
Conservative	K. E. Fowler	8,992		
Conservative	F. C. Harper	8,814		
Conservative	R. A. Percival	8,658		
Labour win (new seat)				
Labour hold		Swing		
Labour hold		Swing		

1952 London County Council election: Islington East
Party	Candidate	Votes	%	±%
Labour	Edwin Bayliss	12,770		
Labour	Bernard Bagnari	12,569		
Labour	Irene Chaplin	12,542		
Conservative	M. R. Clark	7,448		
Conservative	R. A. Craigie	7,350		
Conservative	A. G. Morkill	7,232		
Labour hold		Swing		
Labour hold		Swing		
Labour hold		Swing		

1955 London County Council election: Islington East
Party	Candidate	Votes	%	±%
Labour	Edwin Bayliss	7,530		
Labour	Bernard Bagnari	7,363		
Labour	Irene Chaplin	7,346		
Conservative	P. A. Cooper	4,761		
Conservative	J. Tobin	4,656		
Conservative	Malcolm St Clair	4,613		
Labour hold		Swing		
Labour hold		Swing		
Labour hold		Swing		

1958 London County Council election: Islington North
Party	Candidate	Votes	%	±%
Labour	Edwin Bayliss	8,455		
Labour	Bernard Bagnari	8,255		
Labour	Irene Chaplin	7,881		
Conservative	R. B. Butterfield	3,317		
Conservative	P. A. Cooper	2,976		
Conservative	A. Musgrave Scott	2,889		
Labour hold		Swing		
Labour hold		Swing		
Labour hold		Swing		

1961 London County Council election: Islington East
Party	Candidate	Votes	%	±%
Labour	Edwin Bayliss	8,011		
Labour	Bernard Bagnari	7,774		
Labour	Irene Chaplin	7,697		
Conservative	M. B. Agnew	4,486		
Conservative	M. W. W. Farrow	4,372		
Conservative	A. T. W. Smith	4,349		
Labour hold		Swing		
Labour hold		Swing		
Labour hold		Swing		
