= Charles Robertson (British politician) =

British politician

Charles Robertson (23 February 1874 – 6 January 1968) was a British politician, who served on the London County Council.

Robertson attended Minto School and the University of Edinburgh. He found work in the civil service, from 1902 until 1925 working in the Egyptian Ministry of Education.

At the 1931 London County Council election, Robertson was elected for the Labour Party in Islington East. He lost the seat at the 1934 election, but was appointed as an alderman, and was made vice-chair of the council's education committee. In 1937, he became chair of the education committee, serving until 1945. In 1945/46, he was the chair of the council.

Robertson stood down from the council in 1952, and died in 1968.

Civic offices
Preceded by Somerville Hastings	Chairman of London County Council; 1945–1946	Succeeded by John Cliff
