= Francis Sims =

British trade unionist (1866 – fl.1913)

Francis Ernest Sims (1866 – fl.1913) was a British trade unionist. He was the general secretary of Electrical Trades Union from 1896 to 1900. He expand the union's membership by embarking on a nationwide tour that led to creation of new branches in key cities. He led successful strike actions in Bolton and Sheffield and was a delegate to the founding conference of the Labour Representation Committee in 1900.

== Early life ==
Sims was born in Lambeth, London, to John and Sarah Sims. He worked as an electrician and joined the Electrical Trades Union (ETU).

== Electrical Trades Union ==
=== General secretary ===
In 1895, the union was at its lowest point, heavily indebted, with only 236 members at the end of the year. The general secretary Arthur Walker having been dismissed for embezzling union funds, Sims was elected as general secretary and took up the post in March 1896.

Sims prioritised organisation, and quickly embarked on a sixty-day tour of the UK to strengthen existing branches and form new ones. Results were mixed; although he visited several cities where there was no interest, new branches were founded in Norwich, Bradford, Liverpool and Birmingham, and he impressed existing members. He pressed branches to join local trades councils in order to help secure deals with local authorities.

In 1899, ETU members in Bolton walked out. Sims went to the town to try to resolve the dispute; unable to do so, he made the strike official and achieved victory. The following year, he worked with Councillor Richardson to secure a deal with Sheffield City Council; as a result, a large ETU branch developed in the city. That year, he also attended the founding conference of the Labour Representation Committee, although the ETU did not sign up until 1903.

=== Scandal ===
Later in 1900, complaints mounted about Sims' performance; his duties had been neglected, and financial records did not add up. When challenged by the union's executive, he did not offer an explanation, but gave two months notice of his intention to resign.

The executive arranged an audit, which revealed that Sims had embezzled more than £100 of union money; he eventually admitted this, offering as an explanation only that his salary was insufficient. He was charged with theft and sentence to six months imprisonment.

== Later life ==
On release, Sims formed the Electrical Wiremen's Union, a breakaway from the ETU. The new union was tiny, achieving a maximum of 52 members, and was beset by arguments over the details of its rules, in particular as to whether members would be permitted to work while intoxicated.

In 1903, Sims emigrated to the United States, where his brother was living; he dissolved the Electrical Wiremen's Union and asked the ETU for a reference, although there is no record of one being provided. Sims later returned to the UK, and in 1913 was readmitted to the ETU, as an ordinary member.

Trade union offices
Preceded by Arthur Walker	General Secretary of the Electrical Trades Union; 1895 – 1900	Succeeded by Alfred Ewer
