= Plumbing Trades Union =

Former trade union of the United Kingdom

- Merged into: EETPU
- Dissolved: July 1968
- Headquarters: 15 Abbeville Road, Clapham, London
- Location: United Kingdom
- Members: 11,475 (1907); 55,612 (1967)
- Affiliations: TUC, ITUC, CSEU, NFBTO

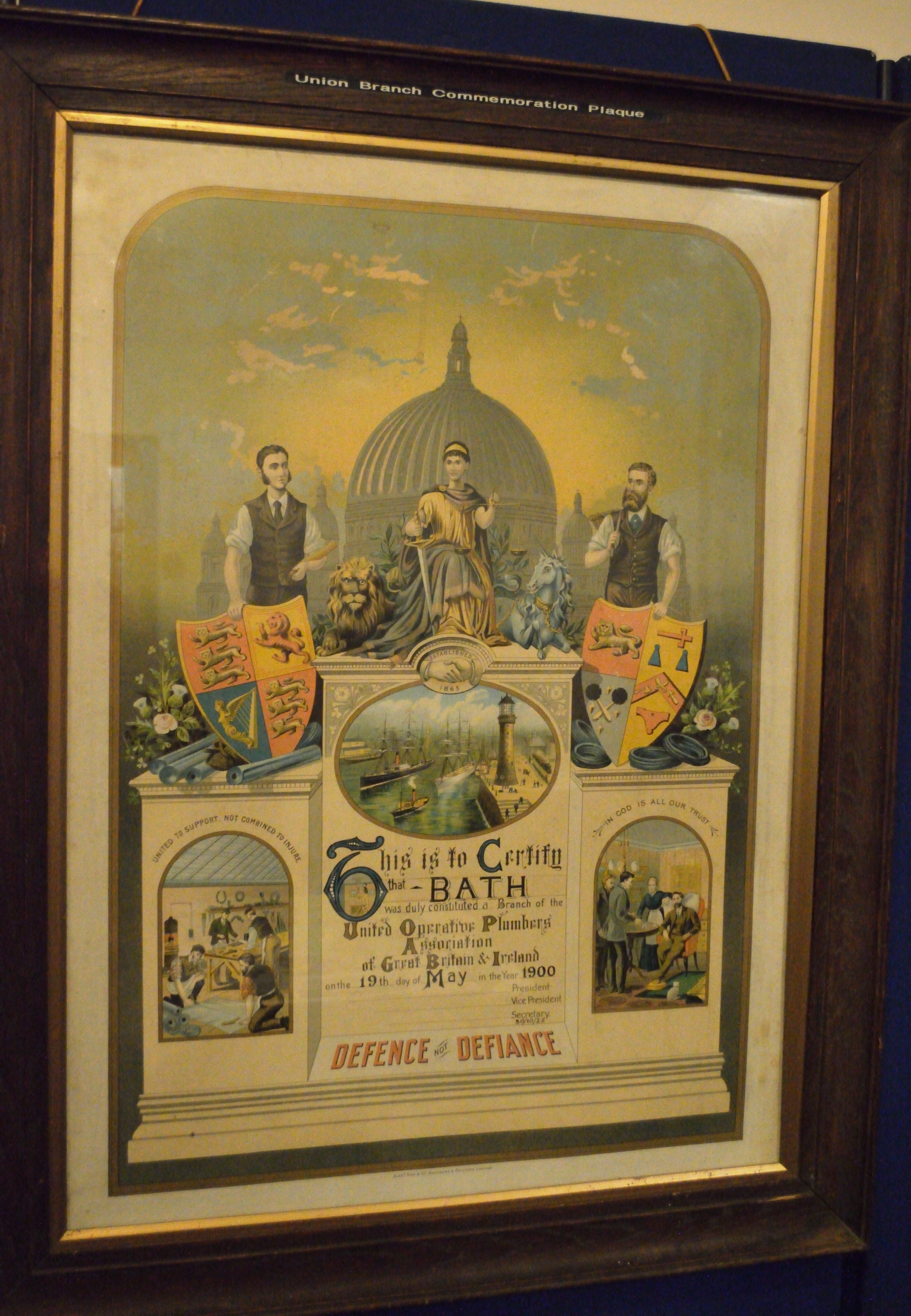
Certificate creating the Bath branch of the union on 19 May 1900

The Plumbing Trades Union (PTU) was a trade union representing plumbers in Britain and Ireland.

== History ==
The union was founded in 1865, when the Manchester Plumbers' Society and the Liverpool Plumbers' Society merged with small organisations from Scotland, Ireland, the English Midlands and other areas of northern England to form the United Operative Plumbers' Association of Great Britain and Ireland (UOPA). By the following year, the union had 1,500 members, and it soon expanded to also cover southern England.

Many of the union's Scottish members left in 1872 to form the rival United Operative Plumbers' Association of Scotland, with the remainder transferring gradually, leaving the union with no Scottish members after 1891. Despite this, overall membership continued to grow, reaching 10,000 in 1900. In 1911, the union was renamed as the United Operative Plumbers and Domestic Engineers Association of Great Britain and Ireland (UOPA), financial difficulties leading a move away from craft unionism and to accept workers in relate trades.

In 1921, the Scottish union rejoined the national body, which in 1931 became the Plumbers', Glaziers' and Domestic Engineers' Union, and adopted its final name in 1946. In 1968, it merged with the Electrical Trades Union to form the Electrical, Electronic, Telecommunications and Plumbing Union.

== General Secretaries ==
1866: J. H. Dobb
1868: George May
1873: William Barnett
1879: George Cherry
1902: E. E. Burns
1910: J. H. Edmiston
1919: Lachlan MacDonald
1929: John W. Stephenson
1950: Hugh Kelly
1968: Charles Lovell
