= Petronella Wyatt =

British journalist and author (born 1968)

- Born: Petronella Aspasia Wyatt; 6 May 1968 (age 58); London, England
- Education: St Paul's Girls' School
- Alma mater: Worcester College, Oxford University College London
- Occupations: Journalist; author
- Parent(s): Woodrow Wyatt; Veronica Banszky von Ambroz (née Racz)

Petronella "Petsy" Aspasia Wyatt (born 6 May 1968) is a British journalist and author.

== Early life and education ==
Wyatt was born on 6 May 1968 at 12 Devonshire Street, London, England. Her parents were the journalist and Labour MP Woodrow Wyatt and his fourth wife, Hungarian-born Veronica "Verushka" Banszky von Ambroz (née Racz).

Wyatt attended St Paul's Girls' School. She then began reading history at Worcester College, Oxford. Wyatt left the university within weeks of her first term, after, she says, suffering persistent bullying and harassment due to her father's position as friend of and political advisor to Conservative prime minister Margaret Thatcher. She subsequently read history at University College London.

== Career ==
After graduating, Wyatt became a trainee journalist and later weekly columnist for the Sunday Telegraph in the early 1990s. She then worked for The Spectator magazine, where she was promoted to deputy editor.

In 1996, when interviewing the proposed Labour Minister for Women Janet Anderson, Anderson joked that "under Labour, women will become more promiscuous", which Wyatt reported as policy. Denis Healey regretted at the close of an interview with Wyatt that there was no time left for "rumpy pumpy".

== Personal life ==
In the 1980s and 1990s, Wyatt occasionally crossed paths with Ghislaine Maxwell, a close friend of convicted sexual predator Jeffrey Epstein. Wyatt subsequently appeared in, and consulted on, the 2022 documentary film Ghislaine Maxwell: Filthy Rich.

Between 2000 and 2004, Wyatt had an affair with the then editor of The Spectator and Conservative MP Boris Johnson. Johnson had promised to leave his wife, and the affair had resulted in a terminated pregnancy and a miscarriage. When her mother found out about the affair, she discussed it with the press. Johnson was fired from his shadow cabinet post by party leader Michael Howard for lying about the affair, after he had initially categorically denied it, famously calling the true allegation "an inverted pyramid of piffle".

== Publications ==
- Father, dear Father: Life with Woodrow Wyatt, Hutchinson, London, 1999. ISBN 0-09-929760-4
- Secrets of The Press, edited by Stephen Glover.
- The Third Plantagenet: George Duke of Clarence, John Ashdown Hill. The History Press, 2014. Contribution.
