= Bob Scouller =

Scottish trade unionist

Robert E. Scouller (died 1974) was a Scottish trade unionist.

Scouller worked as a clerk in Greenock. He became a socialist, inspired by The New Age magazine. He joined the National Union of Clerks (NUC) in 1912, establishing a branch with his brother Edward, and Edwin Muir. In 1915, Scouller was elected as the secretary of the NUC's Scottish Area Council, serving until 1919. While in office, he promoted the idea of national guilds, working with James Henry Lloyd to restructure the union on these lines. The restructure proved unsuccessful, and was soon abandoned.

Scouller became a bailie in Glasgow, and a deputy lieutenant of the county. He served as official report for the Scottish Trades Union Congress, and from 1927 to 1930 served as an auditor of the Trades Union Congress. In 1946, he was elected as full-time president of the NUC, serving until 1951. He then became a trustee of the union, and was awarded its Gold Badge.

Scouller died in 1974, at which time he was still serving as chair of his local branch of the union, by then known as the Association of Professional, Executive, Clerical and Computer Staff.

Trade union offices
Preceded by Hugh Bolton and John Twomey	Auditor of the Trades Union Congress; 1927–1930; With: John Twomey	Succeeded by Arthur Lummis Gibson and John Twomey
Preceded by William Elger	President of the Clerical and Administrative Workers' Union; 1946–1951	Succeeded by Helene Walker
