= Jimmy Rowan =

British trade union leader (1871–1944)

James Rowan (7 October 1871 – 5 January 1944) was a British trade union leader.

Born in Rochdale, Rowan began working at the age of ten, then later became an armature winder in Manchester, before travelling the UK working as an electrician. He joined the Electrical Trades Union (ETU) in 1897, and was elected as its Salford branch secretary in 1899.

Rowan was a delegate to the Manchester and Salford Trades Council from 1900, and was a founder member of the Labour Representation Committee in the city. In 1904, he was appointed as full-time National Organiser of the ETU, and in three years managed to increase membership from 1,000 to 1,500. In May 1907, Alfred Ewer, the union's general secretary, disappeared, and was later found to have emigrated to Australia, having embezzled £144 of union funds. Rowan was appointed as acting general secretary and won an election for the permanent post in July 1907.

Rowan was elected to the General Council of the Trades Union Congress (TUC) in 1921, serving until 1935. In 1933, he was a TUC delegate to the American Federation of Labour, and he represented the TUC at the International Labour Organization on five occasions. He also served on the council of the Confederation of Shipbuilding and Engineering Unions, and various Joint Industrial Councils.

Rowan ultimately served until 1941. He oversaw rapid growth in the union; from 1,500 members in 1907, it grew to more than 80,000 on his retirement. The early 1920s proved a difficult time for the union, and he negotiated a merger with the Transport and General Workers' Union, but this was rejected by the membership. He became known for his anti-communism but, despite this, members of the Communist Party of Great Britain became increasingly prominent in the union.

Trade union offices
Preceded by Alfred Ewer	General Secretary of the Electrical Trades Union; 1907 – 1941	Succeeded by Ernest Bussey
Preceded by Charles Dukes and Bill Holmes	Trades Union Congress representative to the American Federation of Labour; 1933; With: Joe Hall	Succeeded by John Stokes and Alexander Walkden
