= Ernest Bussey =

British trade union leader

Ernest William Bussey CBE (9 December 1891 – 16 July 1958) was a British trade union leader.

Bussey grew up in West Ham and qualified as an electrical engineer. He worked for the West Ham Corporation, then for London County Council. He also became active in the Electrical Trades Union (ETU), and in 1931 was elected as its General President.

In 1941, the ETU's longstanding General Secretary, Jimmy Rowan, retired. Bussey was elected as his replacement, and also took over Rowan's place on the General Council of the Trades Union Congress. In his obituary, Walter Citrine noted that "he never pandered to the more ardently militant section" of the union.

Bussey stood down from his trade union posts at the end of 1946 to join the British Electricity Authority, and was also made a Commander of the Order of the British Empire. From 1952, he was the chair of the Joint Negotiating Committee for the electricity industry. He retired in 1956, and died two years later.

Trade union offices
Preceded by Jack Ball	General President of the Electrical Trades Union; 1930–41	Succeeded by Hugh Bolton
Preceded by Bernard Bagnari and G. Humphreys	Auditor of the Trades Union Congress; 1936; With: John H. Harrison	Succeeded by Bernard Bagnari and Edward Moore
Preceded by Jimmy Rowan	General Secretary of the Electrical Trades Union; 1941–46	Succeeded by Walter Stevens
