= Herbert Elvin (trade unionist) =

British trade unionist

Herbert Henry Elvin (18 July 1874 – 10 November 1949) was a British trade unionist.

Born in Eckington, Derbyshire, Elvin left school at the age of 14, although he later studied with the People's Palace, Birkbeck College and the City of London College. He became a preacher at the age of fifteen, and spent seven years in India.

Elvin joined the National Union of Clerks in 1894, and became a prominent figure, holding the post of honorary secretary from 1906, then general secretary from 1909, serving until 1941. He was elected to the General Council of the Trades Union Congress (TUC) in 1925, and served as President of the TUC in 1938. He also worked as British labour advisor to the International Labour Organization, and on the executive of the League of Nations Union. In his spare time, he organised Slum Children's Outings for the East End. He also stood unsuccessfully as a Labour Party candidate in Bath at the 1922 general election, then Watford in 1924, Spen Valley in 1929, and on one further occasion. He was elected to Middlesex County Council to represent Harrow East in 1946.

Two of Elvin's children became prominent figures: Lionel became Principal of Ruskin College, and George became General Secretary of the Association of Cinematograph Television and Allied Technicians.

Trade union offices
Preceded by Charles Dyer	General Secretary of the National Union of Clerks and Administrative Workers; 1906–1941	Succeeded by Fred Woods
Preceded by David Grenfell and Samuel Lomax	Auditor of the Trades Union Congress; 1922–1924; With: Samuel Lomax (1922–1923); John Twomey (1924)	Succeeded by Samuel Lomax and John Twomey
Preceded by Ernest Bevin	President of the Trades Union Congress; 1938	Succeeded by Joseph Hallsworth
Preceded by Joseph Jones and John W. Stephenson	Trades Union Congress representative to the American Federation of Labour; 1939	Succeeded by Walter Citrine
