= Electrical, Electronic, Telecommunications and Plumbing Union =

Former trade union of the United Kingdom

EETPU
- Electrical, Electronic, Telecommunications and Plumbing Union
- Merged into: AEEU
- Founded: July 1968
- Dissolved: 1 May 1992
- Headquarters: Hayes Court, Bromley, London
- Location: United Kingdom
- Members: 425,000 (1970s)
- Key people: Frank Chapple, Eric Hammond
- Publication: Contact
- Affiliations: TUC, NFBTO, Labour
- Now part of Unite the Union

EETPU shop steward badge

The Electrical, Electronic, Telecommunications and Plumbing Union, known as the EETPU, was a British trade union formed in 1968 as a union for electricians and plumbers, which went through three mergers from 1992 to now be part of Unite the Union.

== History ==
The union was formed in July 1968 with the merger of the Electrical Trades Union and the Plumbing Trades Union to form the Electrical, Electronic & Telecommunications Union & Plumbing Trades Union, which became the Electrical, Electronic, Telecommunications & Plumbing Union in 1973. Archives of government papers show that "a period of severe industrial unrest" began in September 1970. Local authority manual workers wanted a £30 minimum weekly wage. A Committee of Inquiry recommended a 14.5 per cent increase, but the government considered it to be too high. In the winter that followed (i.e. winter of 1970/1971) an electricity power workers strike caused the Cabinet to declare a national emergency. The first miners' strike followed in 1972.

For many years the EETPU owned and operated its own Technical Training Department which was based at Cudham Hall in Kent. This received much acclaim and press attention in its day. It later evolved into a private company known as Technical Training Solutions.

In September 1982, Chapple became President of the Trades Union Congress and was succeeded by Eric Hammond in 1984. Chapple was elevated to the House of Lords as Lord Chapple of Hoxton in 1985.

In 1986 the union's members replaced print workers that had been sacked by News International, prompting the Wapping dispute that led to the irrevocable change of Fleet Street.

=== Expulsion from the TUC ===
The union had its own approach to making deals with companies, and thus often clashed with the TUC from which it was expelled for violating the Bridlington Agreement governing the transfer of members between TUC unions. The EETPU had developed a policy of signing single union agreements in companies where it had few members. In 1987, the TUC asked the EETPU to retract from these agreements at Yuasa (a Japanese battery company), Thorn-EMI and Orion (a Japanese electronics company). The EETPU refused and its 225,000 workers were expelled. Around 5,000 members, led by John Aitkin, decided to split away in order to remain within the mainstream trade union movement, and founded the Electrical and Plumbing Industries Union. It has since been revealed that the EETPU colluded with the Thatcher government in the 1980s, giving advice to ministers about how to 'deal' with left-wing unions, and possibly supplied a list of left-wing union members to the government and security services.

=== Mergers ===
The union merged with the Amalgamated Engineering Union to become the Amalgamated Engineering and Electrical Union (AEEU) in May 1992, so the electricians were now part of the TUC. The AEEU was led by Ken Jackson, who belonged to the EETPU. The AEEU merged with the Manufacturing, Science and Finance (MSF) to become Amicus in 2001. Amicus, the largest private sector union with 1.2m workers, was led by Derek Simpson since June 2002. Tony Dubbins, of the NGA in the Wapping dispute, became Joint Deputy General Secretary in 2004. Amicus merged with the Transport and General Workers' Union in May 2007 to become Unite the Union.

== Amalgamations ==
A large number of small unions amalgamated with the EETPU:

- 1980: Steel Industry Management Association, Telecommunications Staff Association, United Kingdom Association of Professional Engineers
- 1982: British Transport Officers' Guild
- 1983: Association of Management and Professional Staffs
- 1984: Rolls-Royce Management Association
- 1989: Association of British Professional Divers, Ministry of Defence Staff Association, National Association of Senior Probation Officers, Nelson and District Power Loom Overlookers' Association, Springfield Foreman's Association
- 1990: Haslingden and District Power Loom Overlookers' Association, Institute of Journalists Trade Union, National Association of Fire Officers, National Association of Power Loom Overlookers, Nationally Integrated Caring Employees, Prison Service Union, Television and Film Production Employees' Association
- 1991: Colne and District Power Loom Overlookers' Association
- 1992: British Cement Staffs Association

== Election results ==
The union sponsored many Labour Party candidates in each Parliamentary election.

Election	Constituency	Candidate	Votes	Percentage	Position
1970 general election	Swindon	David Stoddart	25,731	55.5	1
1970 general election	Wakefield	Walter Harrison	27,352	58.1	1
1970 general election	Wandsworth Central	Tom Cox	19,776	54.0	1
Feb 1974 general election	Swindon	David Stoddart	24,093	47.9	1
Feb 1974 general election	Tooting	Tom Cox	18,795	48.3	1
Feb 1974 general election	Wakefield	Walter Harrison	27,032	51.3	1
Oct 1974 general election	Swindon	David Stoddart	24,124	51.8	1
Oct 1974 general election	Tooting	Tom Cox	18,530	54.3	1
Oct 1974 general election	Wakefield	Walter Harrison	25,616	54.8	1
1979 general election	Islington Central	John Grant	13,415	51.5	1
1979 general election	Swindon	David Stoddart	25,218	50.2	2
1979 general election	Tooting	Tom Cox	18,642	51.9	1
1979 general election	Wakefield	Walter Harrison	27,124	50.9	1
1982 by-election	Birmingham Northfield	John Spellar	15,904	36.3	1
1983 general election	Birmingham Northfield	John Spellar	19,836	37.5	2
1983 general election	Caithness and Sutherland	Danny Carrigan	3,325	14.3	3
1983 general election	Kingston upon Hull West	Stuart Randall	15,361	41.9	1
1983 general election	Swindon	David Stoddart	20,915	36.7	2
1983 general election	Tooting	Tom Cox	19,640	42.7	1
1983 general election	Wakefield	Walter Harrison	19,166	40.4	1
1987 general election	Birmingham Northfield	John Spellar	20,889	39.2	2
1987 general election	Kingston upon Hull West	Stuart Randall	19,527	51.9	1
1987 general election	Tooting	Tom Cox	21,457	44.2	1
1991 by-election	Langbaurgh	Ashok Kumar	22,442	42.9	1
1992 general election	Folkestone and Hythe	Peter Doherty	6,347	12.1	3
1992 general election	Gosport	M. F. Angus	7,275	13.6	3
1992 general election	Kingston upon Hull West	Stuart Randall	21,139	57.3	1
1992 general election	Langbaurgh	Ashok Kumar	28,454	43.1	2
1992 general election	Tooting	Tom Cox	24,601	48.2	1
1992 general election	Warley West	John Spellar	21,386	50.6	1

== Leadership ==
=== General Secretaries ===
1968: Frank Chapple
1984: Eric Hammond

=== General Presidents ===
1968: Les Cannon
1972: Frank Chapple (jointly with general secretary post)
1975: Tom Breakell
1986: Paul Gallagher

=== Plumbing National Secretaries ===
1968: Charles Lovell
1988: Bill Gannon
