= Electrical and Plumbing Industries Union =

UK trade union

The Electrical and Plumbing Industries Union (EPIU) was a trade union representing engineers, plumbers and related workers in the United Kingdom.

The union was founded in 1988 as a split from the Electrical, Electronic, Telecommunications and Plumbing Union (EETPU). That year, the EETPU was expelled from the Trades Union Congress (TUC) for making agreements with companies that it would be the only trade union they recognised, against the opposition of other TUC members. Around 5,000 members of the EETPU were determined to remain within the mainstream trade union movement and left to form the EPIU, under the leadership of John Aitkin.

The EPIU initially had no structure and was unable to represent its members, or even accept their membership payments. As a result, five other unions represented its membership, on a temporary basis. Only in 1991 was the union put on a sound basis, recognised by the Trade Union Certification Officer and accepted into the TUC. It established an office at Park House on Wandsworth Common.

In both 1991 and 1993, the EPIU attempted to join the National Engineering Construction Committee. It was supported by the GMB, Manufacturing, Science and Finance and Transport and General Workers' Union (TGWU), but opposed by the Amalgamated Engineering and Electrical Union, into which the EETPU had merged, and also by employers' organisations.

In 1995, the EPIU merged into the Transport and General Workers' Union.
