= Fred Woods (trade unionist) =

British trade union leader

Frederick Cecil Woods (20 March 1891 - 16 April 1961) was a British trade union leader.

Woods worked for the Post Office and first joined a trade union in 1908. This became part of the Union of Post Office Workers, and Woods slowly rose to prominence, serving on its executive committee from 1933, and as its full-time London district secretary from 1936. By the end of the decade, he was also serving as president and acting assistant secretary of the union, but he resigned in 1940 to join the National Union of Clerks. This was about to merge with the Association of Women Clerks and Secretaries, and he was appointed as the first general secretary of the new union, the Clerical and Administrative Workers' Union, taking up the post at the start of 1941.

While leader of the union, Woods represented it at the Trades Union Congress, serving on its Local Government Committee. Under his leadership, membership of the union increased from 20,000 to 53,000.

Woods was also active in the Labour Party, representing Child's Hill on Hendon Urban District Council from 1926 to 1929.

Woods retired from his trade union posts in 1956, and died five years later, aged 70.

Trade union offices
Preceded by Herbert Elvin	General Secretary of the Clerical and Administrative Workers' Union; 1941–1956	Succeeded by Anne Godwin
