= Jock Byrne =

Scottish trade unionist

John Thomas Byrne Esquire OBE JP 24 January 1903 – 5 December 1969) was a Scottish trade union leader and anti-communist activist.

Byrne was born in Uphall, West Lothian, to Irish parents John Byrne, a shale miner, and Catherine Doonan, who were married in Broxburn in 1900. Byrne worked as an electrician and joined the Electrical Trades Union (ETU).

He began an apprenticeship at Beardmore Shipyard in Dalmuir in Clydebank, Scotland at age 15. Following this he worked in mines in the area of Broxburn in Lothian maintaining electrical systems and plant.

He returned to the Clydebank area and found work as Chief Electrical Engineer at John Brown Shipyard working on the Queen Mary ocean liner, now docked in California USA.

He was requested during WW2 to select persons and occupations in the yard which would be protected from being drafted into the armed forces. Once completed, he was asked to do the same for the Scottish nation.

Post war he was asked to join a committee to examine the National Health Service in terms of labour shortages and quality of service. Subsequently he received an award from King George.

He became the union's Glasgow area secretary, a post he held for eighteen years. In 1948, he stood to become assistant general secretary of the union, losing to Frank Haxell, a member of the Communist Party of Great Britain (CPGB). In 1955, the general secretaryship of the union became available, and he again stood against Haxell and was defeated. He claimed that CPGB members in the union were fixing elections. In this, he gained substantial support, particularly from Les Cannon, a CPGB member who resigned after the Soviet invasion of Hungary, Labour Party Members of Parliament John Freeman and Woodrow Wyatt and the Catholic Action movement.

In 1951 Byrne was awarded an MBE by King George in the New Year Honours for his services as an Area Secretary to the Electrical Trades Union in West Scotland.

In 1956 Byrne was upgraded to OBE by Queen Elizabeth.

He was also a Justice of the Peace for the County of the City of Glasgow from 1950.

Byrne stood against Haxell again in 1959, and was widely expected to win. However, it was declared that he had narrowly lost the election. He and Frank Chapple took Haxell and fourteen other CPGB members to court, alleging that the election had been fixed. In 1961, they won the case and the court declared Byrne elected as general secretary. Byrne expelled Haxell from the union but did not agree to a Trades Union Congress (TUC) demand to bar all existing officers from office for five years. As a result, the ETU were expelled from the TUC and, later, also from the Labour Party.

Byrne organised new elections and was re-elected as general secretary, with his supporters winning almost all the elected posts. They banned communists from holding elected office in the union, and the ETU was subsequently readmitted to the TUC and Labour Party.

Byrne suffered a stroke in 1961 and was thereafter concerned about his health. He decided to retire in 1966, when his full term of office ended, and he died three years later from a stroke.

Trade union offices
Preceded by Frank Haxell	General Secretary of the Electrical Trades Union; 1961 – 1966	Succeeded by Frank Chapple
