= Helene Walker =

Helene Walker MBE (1904 – December 1994) was a British trade unionist.

Working as a clerk for a co-operative in Birmingham in the 1931, Walker joined the National Union of Clerks. She soon won election to the union's executive, and in 1946 was awarded the Trades Union Congress' Women's Gold Badge for her contributions to trade unionism.

In 1951, Walker won election as its president of the union, serving until 1960. The union's secretary at the time was Anne Godwin, and it was extremely unusual for a mixed trade union to be led by two women. Walker and Godwin worked together well, focusing on improving working conditions for all clerks, and moving towards equal pay for women.

Walker was made a Member of the Order of the British Empire in 1946.

Trade union offices
Preceded by Bob Scouller	President of the Clerical and Administrative Workers' Union; 1951–1960	Succeeded by David Currie
