= Samuel Lomax (politician) =

British trade unionist and politician

Samuel Lomax (1872 – 5 May 1944) was a British trade unionist and politician who served as the Mayor of Bolton.

Born in Kearsley, Lomax was educated at Kearsley Council School and became a half-timer in a cotton mill. He then joined the Lancashire and Yorkshire Railway Company in Bolton, working as a parcels clerk, and joined the Railway Clerks' Association (RCA).

Lomax was a member of the Independent Labour Party and a supporter of the Labour Party, chairing the Bolton branches of both bodies. In 1915, he was elected to Bolton County Borough Council, representing the East ward. He lost his seat in 1919, but was sponsored by the RCA as a candidate for Bolton at the 1922 United Kingdom general election. He took third place in two seat constituency, with 16.1% of the vote. He was re-elected in East ward in 1925, and became an alderman in 1928. In 1932/33, he was Mayor of Bolton.

In 1924, Lomax was appointed as head of the finance department of the London, Midland and Scottish Railway. He served twice as chair of the RCA, and was elected as an auditor of the Trades Union Congress most years from 1921 until 1925.

Bolton Labour Party expelled Lomax in 1935, complaining that he had opposed its favoured candidate in an election. The national Labour Party investigated, and reinstated Lomax. He continued on the council, moving to become a councillor for Bradford ward from 1940.

Trade union offices
| Preceded by Walter Smith and William Straker | Auditor of the Trades Union Congress; 1921–1923; With: David Grenfell (1921); Herbert Elvin (1922–1923) | Succeeded by Herbert Elvin and John Twomey |
| Preceded by Herbert Elvin and John Twomey | Auditor of the Trades Union Congress; 1925; With: John Twomey | Succeeded by Hugh Bolton and John Twomey |
Civic offices
| Preceded by George Sykes | Mayor of Bolton; 1932/33 | Succeeded by Ernest Monks |
