= Arthur Walker (trade unionist) =

British trade unionist

Arthur J. Walker was a British trade unionist.

Walker worked as an electrician in the 1880s and was a founder member of the Electrical Trades Union (ETU) in 1889. At the first conference of the ETU, the following year, he was elected as the union's inaugural president, while Dick Steadman was appointed as the first general secretary, working on a part-time basis.

In 1891, the ETU decided to make the general secretary post full-time. Steadman did not wish to give up his work, and Walker was elected unopposed, and stated that he hoped he would remain in the post for life. Initially, membership rose under his leadership, peaking at 1,183 in 1892. He reviewed the union's financial position and raised concerns that its income would not cover its commitments to pay benefits to members. This occurred as the year went on, a downturn in the trade leading to many members finding themselves unemployed. In response, the union's executive committee decided to introduce a levy on working members of three pennies per week. This led many members to resign, worsening the union's financial position.

By 1894, only 402 members of the ETU remained, the large majority in London. Walker was perceived as incompetent, struggling with administration and accounting. The executive appointed a treasurer, Arthur Senior, in an attempt to resolve the union accounts, and this process revealed that £21 9s 3d was missing, believed to have been stolen by Walker. He was dismissed from the general secretaryship in November 1894, and Steadman took over on a part-time acting basis until new elections were held.

Trade union offices
Preceded by New position	President of the Electrical Trades Union; 1890 – 1891	Succeeded by Thomas Cannon
Preceded by Dick Steadman	General Secretary of the Electrical Trades Union; 1891 – 1894	Succeeded by Francis Sims
