= Walter Stevens (trade unionist) =

British trade union leader (1904-1954)

Walter Charles Stevens (26 September 1904 – 24 October 1954) was a British trade union leader.

Born in Woolwich, Stevens began working at the age of ten, and completed an apprenticeship as an electrician by age twenty. He soon became a sound engineer at Denham Studios, and was also active in the Electrical Trades Union (ETU).

By the time he reached his thirties, Stevens was a full-time union official in the ETU. He served for a while as London Area Secretary, and in 1942 was elected Assistant General Secretary. In 1946 he joined the Communist Party of Great Britain. Two years later he was elected General Secretary of the ETU. It was a landslide victory, with more than three times the vote total of his opponent.

During his tenure in office, Stevens moved the union in a more militant direction. He organised a wave of strikes in late 1953 and early 1954.

In his spare time, Stevens enjoyed attending boxing matches, and was involved in founding the Professional Boxers' Association. He stood in the 1952 and 1953 elections for the General Council of the Trades Union Congress, but was unsuccessful.

Walter Stevens died on 24 October 1954, as a result of injuries sustained in a car accident a week earlier. He was 50.

Trade union offices
Preceded by Robert Prain	Assistant General Secretary of the Electrical Trades Union; 1942 – 1948	Succeeded by Frank Haxell
Preceded by Ernest Bussey	General Secretary of the Electrical Trades Union; 1948 – 1954	Succeeded by Frank Haxell
