= Frank Chapple =

British trade union leader (1921–2004)

The Right Honourable The Lord Chapple
- Frank Chapple

Member of the House of Lords
- Lord Temporal
- Life peerage 4 February 1985 – 19 October 2004

Personal details
- Born: 8 August 1921
- Died: 19 October 2004 (aged 83)

Frank Chapple, Baron Chapple (8 August 1921 – 19 October 2004) was general secretary of the Electrical, Electronic, Telecommunications and Plumbing Union (EETPU), a leading British trade union.

== Life ==
Frank Chapple was born in the slum area of Hoxton, east London, in a flat above his father's shoe-repair shop. There was no bath or running hot water in the Chapple home, later, on Pitfield Street.

A Communist Party member early in his adult life, Chapple left the party after, and partly as a result of, the Soviet suppression of the Hungarian Revolution of 1956. He became a forceful anti-communist, and with Les Cannon ran a successful campaign in the late 1950s to counter communist vote-rigging in his union. He joined the Labour Party in 1958.

Chapple served as a member of the Trades Union Congress general council for 12 years to 1983, having first joined the union in 1937, and he had held offices at every level in the electricians' union. From 1966 to 1984 he was the general secretary of the EETPU. After his retirement, he was elevated to the House of Lords as a life peer on 4 February 1985 taking the title Baron Chapple, of Hoxton in Greater London. His successor was fellow anti-communist Eric Hammond. One of Chapple's sons, Barry Chapple, was a regional official of Amicus, which succeeded the EETPU. Amicus merged with the TGWU in 2007 to become Unite the Union.

Trade union offices
Preceded by Jock Byrne	General Secretary of the Electrical Trades Union; 1966–1968	Position abolished
New post	General Secretary of the Electrical, Electronic, Telecommunications and Plumbing Union; 1968–1984	Succeeded by Eric Hammond
Preceded by Les Cannon	General President of the Electrical, Electronic, Telecommunications and Plumbing Union; 1972–1976	Position abolished
Preceded by Les Cannon	Electrical Group representative on the General Council of the TUC; 1970 – 1982	Council reorganised
Preceded by Alan Sapper	President of the Trades Union Congress; 1983	Succeeded by Ray Buckton
