= Association of Professional, Executive, Clerical and Computer Staff =

British trade union, 1940–1989

APEX
- Association of Professional, Executive, Clerical and Computer Staff
- Predecessor: Association of Women Clerks and Secretaries; National Union of Clerks
- Merged into: GMB
- Founded: 1940
- Dissolved: 1989
- Headquarters: 70 St George's Square, London
- Location: United Kingdom
- Members: 140,292 (1980)
- Publication: The Clerk
- Affiliations: TUC, LMTU, Labour, FIET

The Association of Professional, Executive, Clerical and Computer Staff (APEX) was a British trade union which represented clerical and administrative employees.

== History ==
The Clerks Union was formed in 1890 and later was renamed as the National Union of Clerks. Then, following rapid growth and amalgamation with several other unions, the name was again changed to the National Union of Clerks and Administrative Workers (NUCAW) with a membership of around 40,000.

In 1940, NUCAW merged with the Association of Women Clerks and Secretaries (AWCS) to form the Clerical and Administrative Workers' Union (CAWU). The union organised in the white-collar sector in the City of London and across the country, and had particular success in recruiting in the engineering industry. In the 1960s its membership grew rapidly, but it was less successful in the 1970s, membership increasing by 18%, while that of its rival, the Association of Scientific, Technical and Managerial Staffs (ASTMS), nearly doubled.

The union changed its name to the Association of Professional, Executive, Clerical and Computer Staff (APEX) in 1972. It was the union at the centre of the Grunwick dispute in the 1970s.

APEX, like its predecessors, was an affiliated trade union of the British Labour Party and was a key influence on the right wing of the Party, particularly as, until 1972, it enforced a rule preventing communists from holding positions in the union. Its relations with other unions were often difficult, as it competed not only with the ASTMS for members, but also with the National Union of Bank Employees and various general unions. In particular, a dispute over members at General Accident was referred to the Trades Union Congress Disputes Committee and the fall-out led to APEX's general secretary, Roy Grantham, failing to win re-election to the General Council of the TUC.

In 1989 APEX merged with the GMB trade union and now exists as a section within the GMB.

== Election results ==
The union sponsored numerous Labour Party candidates, many of whom were elected:

Election	Constituency	Candidate	Votes	Percentage	Position
1922 general election	Bath	Herbert Elvin	4,849	17.8	3
1945 general election	Liverpool Everton	Bertie Kirby	9,088	65.4	1
1950 general election	Liverpool West Derby	Bertie Kirby	25,417	48.1	2
1950 general election	Sheffield Park	Fred Mulley	30,558	67.7	1
1951 general election	Sheffield Park	Fred Mulley	30,842	69.2	1
1955 general election	Birmingham All Saints	Denis Howell	18,867	51.8	1
1955 general election	Sheffield Park	Fred Mulley	28,904	73.2	1
1959 general election	Birmingham All Saints	Denis Howell	17,215	50.0	2
1959 general election	Sheffield Park	Fred Mulley	26,078	71.1	1
1961 by-election	Birmingham Small Heath	Denis Howell	12,182	59.2	1
1964 general election	Birmingham Ladywood	Victor Yates	10,098	63.2	1
1964 general election	Birmingham Small Heath	Denis Howell	17,010	60.4	1
1964 general election	Sheffield Park	Fred Mulley	24,196	75.6	1
1966 general election	Birmingham Ladywood	Victor Yates	8,895	58.9	1
1966 general election	Birmingham Small Heath	Denis Howell	18,075	69.5	1
1966 general election	Darlington	Edward Fletcher	23,909	50.5	1
1966 general election	Sheffield Park	Fred Mulley	24,550	80.3	1
1970 general election	Birmingham Small Heath	Denis Howell	13,794	61.1	1
1970 general election	Darlington	Edward Fletcher	23,208	48.5	1
1970 general election	Sheffield Park	Fred Mulley	23,302	75.3	1
Feb 1974 general election	Birmingham Small Heath	Denis Howell	19,319	57.3	1
Feb 1974 general election	Darlington	Edward Fletcher	20,546	40.8	1
Feb 1974 general election	Glasgow Craigton	Bruce Millan	18,055	51.3	1
Feb 1974 general election	Gower	Ifor Davies	23,856	52.9	1
Feb 1974 general election	Hertford and Stevenage	Shirley Williams	30,343	44.7	1
Feb 1974 general election	Sheffield Park	Fred Mulley	31,273	65.0	1
Oct 1974 general election	Birmingham Small Heath	Denis Howell	19,703	66.5	1
Oct 1974 general election	Darlington	Edward Fletcher	21,334	45.6	1
Oct 1974 general election	Glasgow Craigton	Bruce Millan	16,952	50.5	1
Oct 1974 general election	Gower	Ifor Davies	25,067	57.3	1
Oct 1974 general election	Hertford and Stevenage	Shirley Williams	29,548	47.1	1
Oct 1974 general election	Sheffield Park	Fred Mulley	30,057	71.4	1
1979 general election	Birmingham Small Heath	Denis Howell	17,735	60.5	1
1979 general election	Darlington	Edward Fletcher	22,565	45.5	1
1979 general election	Glasgow Craigton	Bruce Millan	19,952	59.9	1
1979 general election	Gower	Ifor Davies	24,963	53.2	1
1979 general election	Hertford and Stevenage	Shirley Williams	30,443	45.1	2
1979 general election	Sheffield Park	Fred Mulley	27,483	68.6	1
1983 general election	Aberavon	John Morris	23,745	58.8	1
1983 general election	Birmingham Small Heath	Denis Howell	22,874	63.8	1
1983 general election	Glasgow Govan	Bruce Millan	20,370	55.0	1
1987 general election	Aberavon	John Morris	27,126	66.8	1
1987 general election	Birmingham Small Heath	Denis Howell	22,787	66.3	1
1987 general election	Glasgow Govan	Bruce Millan	24,071	64.8	1

== Leadership ==
=== General Secretaries ===
1890: W. Moritz
1890: W. M. Sutherland
Charles Dyer
1906: Herbert Henry Elvin
1941: Fred Woods
1956: Anne Godwin
1963: Henry Chapman
1971: Roy Grantham

=== Presidents ===
1890: Wallas
1890: J. W. E. Hale
1912: G. E. O'Dell
1914: R. J. W. Scott
1915: John Lindsley
1916: Charles Latham
1918: James McKinlay
1927: Hubert Hughes
1940: William Elger
1946: Bob Scouller
1951: Helene Walker
1961: David Currie
1972: Denis Howell
1983: Ken Smith

== See also ==
- UK labour law
- List of UK trade unions
