= Erik Linstrum =

American historian

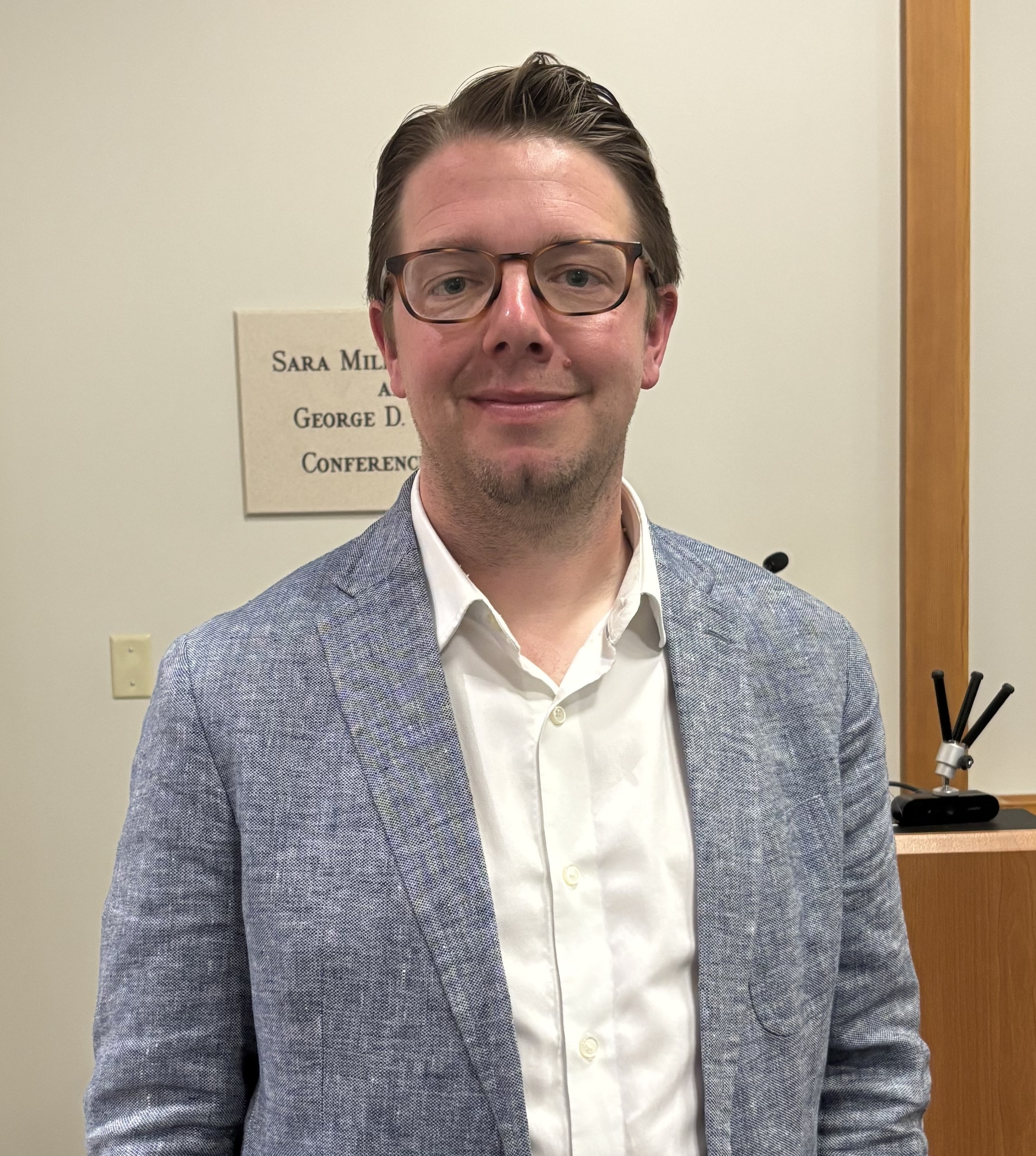
- Linstrum in 2025
- Occupation: Historian

Academic background
- Education: Princeton University (A.B.); Harvard University (A.M., PhD)

Academic work
- Discipline: History
- Institutions: University of Virginia

Erik Linstrum is an American historian known for his research on the interplay between psychology, media, and British colonialism. He presently works as a professor at the University of Virginia. Linstrum's scholarship has focused on events during decolonisation, such as the Cyprus Emergency, the Mau Mau rebellion, and the Malayan Emergency.

== Honors and awards ==
For his contributions to historical scholarship, Erik Linstrum has received a series of honors and awards:

- Harold K. Gross Prize, Department of History, Harvard University (2012): This early recognition highlighted the potential and promise of Linstrum's scholarly endeavors.
- FHHS Article Prize, Forum for History of Human Science (2013): Linstrum's ability to bridge the gap between psychology and historical analysis was acknowledged through this award.
- Walter D. Love Article Prize, North American Conference on British Studies (2013): His engagement with British history and its colonial legacy was celebrated by this award.
- Michigan Society of Fellows, University of Michigan (2012-2015): Linstrum's scholarly pursuits were further supported during his tenure as a fellow at the University of Michigan.
- Kluge Fellowship, Library of Congress (2016): This fellowship provided Linstrum with the opportunity to conduct in-depth research at the Library of Congress.
- George Louis Beer Prize, American Historical Association (2017): Linstrum's skill in illuminating historical complexities was acknowledged through this notable prize.
- Berlin Prize, American Academy in Berlin (2020): His insights into British colonialism earned him the prestigious Berlin Prize fellowship.
- ACLS/Burkhardt Fellowship for Recently Tenured Scholars (2020): This fellowship demonstrated the scholarly community's recognition of Linstrum's accomplishments.
- American Philosophical Society/British Academy Fellowship (2023): One of the most esteemed recognitions in academia, this fellowship underscored Linstrum's profound contributions to historical studies.

== Published works (selection) ==
- "The Politics of Psychology in the British Empire, 1898-1960," which was published in Past & Present 215 (May 2012) and delved into the role of psychology within the context of the British Empire.
- "Specters of Dependency: Psychoanalysis in the Age of Decolonization," a contribution to the book Psychoanalysis in the Age of Totalitarianism (Routledge, 2016), exploring the complex relationship between psychoanalysis and decolonization.
- Ruling Minds: Psychology in the British Empire (Harvard University Press, 2016), a monograph that offers a comprehensive analysis of the role of psychology in shaping British colonial policies.
- "Facts about Atrocity: Reporting Colonial Violence in Postwar Britain," an article in History Workshop Journal 84 (fall 2017) that examines how colonial violence was reported and understood in postwar Britain.
- "Domesticating Chemical Weapons: Tear Gas and the Militarization of Policing in the British Imperial World," published in the Journal of Modern History 91 (September 2019), which delves into the militarization of policing in the context of the British Empire.
- "The Case History in the Colonies," an article in History of the Human Sciences 33 (October 2020), exploring the use of case histories in colonial contexts.
- "Decolonizing Britain: An Exchange," a collaborative effort with other scholars, published in Twentieth Century British History 33, no. 2 (June 2022), offering insights into the decolonization process.
- Age of Emergency: Living with Violence at the End of the British Empire (Oxford University Press, 2023), examining the lived experiences of violence during the twilight of the British Empire.
