= Electrical Trades Union (United Kingdom) =

Former trade union of the United Kingdom

- Merged into: EETPU
- Founded: 1889
- Dissolved: July 1968
- Headquarters: Manchester, England
- Location: United Kingdom
- Affiliations: TUC, ITUC, CSEU, Labour

The Electrical Trades Union (ETU) was a trade union representing electricians in the United Kingdom, much of its membership consisting of wiring fitters and telephone engineers.

== History ==
=== Early history ===
The union was founded in 1889 with the merger of the Union of Electrical Operatives, a London-based union formed in 1868, and the Amalgamated Society of Telegraph and Telephone Construction Men, based in Manchester. Initially, the union had 570 members, most of whom were employees of the National Telephone Company. Its first part-time secretary, elected at the inaugural conference in 1890, was Dick Steadman.

The National Telephone Company's Brighton office was known for poor working conditions and, in 1891, an ETU branch was formed there, led by Alfred Ewer. After failed negotiations, the union began a strike, but this collapsed after five weeks. The remaining strikers were sacked, although the union helped them find them work elsewhere. In response, the union decided to appoint its first full-time general secretary; Arthur Walker was elected unopposed. He raised concerns that the union was unable to meet its commitments to out-of-work benefits to members. This became an immediate problem with a downturn in trade the following year; union membership peaked at 1,183 that year but then began to fall. The executive decided to institute a levy of three pennies per member per week in order to make up a shortfall, but this just led to more members leaving, and membership fell to only 402 in 1894. Walker was forced to resign after stealing union funds, and Steadman replaced him on a temporary basis.

Steadman was unable to solve the union's problems, and membership reached an all-time low of 236 members at the end of 1895. Francis Sims was elected as a full-time general secretary, in a final attempt to turn its fortunes around. He undertook a tour of the UK, attempting to form new branches and strengthen existing ones. While this produced mixed results, membership began to recover, and a successful strike in Bolton in 1899, and an agreement signed with Sheffield Town Council in 1900 further improved his reputation. However, the following year, he too was found to have embezzled union funds, leading to his imprisonment for six months. On release, he tried to set up a breakaway union, the Electrical Wiremen's Union, but this failed to grow and was disbanded in 1903.

Alfred Ewer was elected as Sims' replacement, and the union joined the Federation of Engineering and Shipbuilding Trades in 1906. Ewer's time in office was marked by conflict between the London-based executive and the provincial branches, culminating in a vote in 1907 to move the head office to Manchester. He disappeared in May 1907, and was later found to have emigrated to Australia without informing his wife or friends, having stolen £144 of union funds.

=== Growth under Rowan ===
Jimmy Rowan, the union's national organiser, was elected as Ewer's replacement, and he ultimately served until 1941. He and oversaw rapid growth in the union; from 1,500 members in 1907, it grew to more than 80,000 on his retirement.

In 1918, the union balloted its members on joining the new Amalgamated Engineering Union, but this was not approved. The early 1920s proved a difficult time for the union, and Rowan negotiated a merger with the Transport and General Workers' Union, but this too was rejected by the membership. Walter Citrine was appointed as an assistant general secretary of the union in 1920, and transformed its finances, making the reputation which led to his later appointment as General Secretary of the Trades Union Congress.

=== Communism and anti-communism ===
Rowan was known for his anti-communism but, despite this, members of the Communist Party of Great Britain (CPGB) became prominent in the union under his leadership; by the 1950s, both General Secretary and General President were CPGB members. The ETU was known to have enjoyed close contacts with the London branch of the Caribbean Labour Congress led by communist activist Billy Strachan.

In the spring of 1961, there were allegations that ETU ballots were being rigged by communists. In June 1961, the ETU was taken to court by Jock Byrne and Frank Chapple, arguing that members of the CPGB had been part of a "conspiracy to defraud" in internal elections.

After its leader Jock Byrne suffered a stroke, Frank Chapple became the union's leader in 1966. Unusually for a union leader at the time, Chapple espoused free-market thinking, and he aimed to rid his union of communists; his former union - the ETU had been run by communists.

=== Merger ===
In July 1968, the ETU merged with the Plumbing Trades Union to form the Electrical, Electronic, Telecommunications and Plumbing Union.

== Election results ==
The union sponsored Labour Party candidates in several Parliamentary elections.

Election	Constituency	Candidate	Votes	Percentage	Position
1945 general election	Dundee	Thomas Cook	48,804	28.6	1
1950 general election	Dundee East	Thomas Cook	26,005	53.3	1
1950 general election	Heywood and Royton	Charles Hurley	21,482	40.2	2
1951 general election	Cheltenham	James Finnigan	17,777	42.9	2
1951 general election	Dundee East	Thomas Cook	26,668	53.8	1
1951 general election	Heywood and Royton	Charles Hurley	24,083	46.1	2
1955 by-election	Edinburgh North	George Scott	7,799	40.6	2
1955 general election	Cheltenham	James Finnigan	16,638	40.7	2
1955 general election	Edinburgh North	George Scott	12,664	38.3	2
1959 general election	Bridgwater	James Finnigan	14,706	32.3	2
1959 general election	Croydon North West	David Chalkley	14,658	32.0	2
1959 general election	East Aberdeenshire	John Urquhart	10,980	36.6	2
1959 general election	Liverpool Walton	George McCartney	20,254	45.5	2
1964 general election	Brentford and Chiswick	David Chalkley	13,475	44.3	2
1964 general election	Caithness and Sutherland	John Urquhart	6,619	30.2	2
1964 general election	Carlton	Robert Mellor	21,546	36.2	2
1964 general election	Newbury	David Stoddart	18,943	34.4	2
1964 general election	Wakefield	Walter Harrison	26,315	55.5	1
1966 general election	Stroud	Tom Cox	20,259	40.1	2
1966 general election	Wakefield	Walter Harrison	28,907	65.4	1

== Office holders ==
=== General Secretaries ===
1890: Dick Steadman
1891: Arthur Walker
1894: Dick Steadman (acting)
1895: Francis Sims
1900: Alfred Ewer
1907: James Rowan
1941: Ernest Bussey
1948: Walter Stevens
1955: Frank Haxell
1961: Jock Byrne
1966: Frank Chapple

=== General Presidents ===
1890: Arthur Walker
1891: Thomas Cannon
1894: G. Montague
1896: J. Hart
1898: Joe Pearce
1899: Bill Gooday
1901: Fred O'donoghue
1904: Jack Pearce
1906: George Dibdin
1907: S. Morris
1908: Jack Ball
1931: Ernest Bussey
1941: Hugh Bolton
1945: Frank Foulkes
1962: Les Cannon
