= Les Cannon =

Sir Leslie Cannon CBE (21 February 1920 – 9 December 1970) was a prominent British trade union official and served as General President of the Electrical Trades Union from 1963 to 1970.

== Life ==
Cannon was born in Wigan, the son of a coal miner, and became a Communist activist, and trade union leader. He was a member of Electrical Trades Union (ETU) Executive Council, North Lancashire and Merseyside, 1948–1954.

In November 1956, Cannon, under the influence of On the Cult of Personality and Its Consequences, left the Communist Party of Great Britain. In 1961 he uncovered an ETU ballot rigging scandal, and successfully sued the union. Cannon became president of the ETU in September 1963, a post left vacant by disgraced former president Frank Foulkes. In his time as leader of the ETU, he took part in a merger with the plumbers' union to create the EETPU.

Cannon died from cancer, aged 50.

== Notes ==
Trade union offices
Preceded by Frank Foulkes	General President of the Electrical Trades Union; 1962–1968	Succeeded by Position abolished
Preceded by New position	General President of the Electrical, Electronic, Telecommunications and Plumbing Union; 1968–1970	Succeeded by Frank Chapple
Preceded by New position	Electrical Group representative on the General Council of the TUC; 1965–1970	Succeeded by Frank Chapple
