= Ben Rubner =

British trade union leader (1921–1998)

Benjamin Barnett Rubner (30 September 1921 – 21 September 1998) was a British cabinet-maker who became a trade union leader.

== Biography ==
Rubner was born into a working-class Jewish family in Bethnal Green in the East End of London. He was the youngest of three sons. His father fought in the 1936 Battle of Cable Street. Ben undertook an apprenticeship as a cabinet-maker, and joined the National Amalgamated Furnishing Trades Association (NAFTA). While in his twenties, he joined the Communist Party of Great Britain, and remained a communist throughout his life. During World War II, he served in the Royal Corps of Signals. He was deployed with the Eighth Army in North Africa and Italy.

After the war, Rubner became a shop steward. He rose to prominence in the London Furniture Workers Shop Stewards' Council, serving as its chairman and convener from 1947 to 1952. By this time, NAFTA had merged with the Amalgamated Union of Upholsterers to form the National Union of Furniture Trade Operatives (NUFTO). In 1954, Rubner was elected to NUFTO's London District Committee, and four years later to its General Executive Council. By 1959 he was the full-time London District Organiser, and the National Trade Organiser starting in 1963.

In 1964 he visited Vietnam, and the experience led to his involvement in the British movement against the Vietnam War. He subsequently campaigned against apartheid in South Africa. In his public speaking, Rubner was said to have a booming baritone voice that "rarely needed a microphone".

In 1971, NUFTO became part of the Furniture, Timber and Allied Trades Union (FTAT), and Rubner was elected its assistant general secretary. In 1978, he was elected general secretary. As FTAT's leader, he campaigned for improved health and safety, such as replacing foam furniture fillings that created toxic fumes killing 22 workers in the James Watt Street fire. He also served on the Central Arbitration Committee of ACAS and until his retirement in 1986, he was active in the Trades Union Congress.

Ben Rubner died in Watford General Hospital on 21 September 1998, shortly before his 77th birthday. He was survived by his second wife Pat and two children.

Trade union offices
Preceded by Charles Stewart	Assistant General Secretary of the Furniture, Timber and Allied Trades Union; 1971 – 1978	Succeeded by Jim Kooyman
Preceded by Robert Shube	General Secretary of the Furniture, Timber and Allied Trades Union; 1978 – 1986	Succeeded by Colin Christopher
