= Robert Shube =

British trade unionist and cabinetmaker

Robert Saul Shube (born Solomon Shube; 15 October 1904 – 20 October 1978) was a British trade unionist and cabinetmaker.

Shube was born in Manchester to Russian Jewish immigrants. He worked in the East End of London. He joined the National Amalgamated Furnishing Trades Association (NAFTA), soon winning election to its executive committee, and in 1929 also joined the Communist Party of Great Britain. He visited Moscow twice in the early 1930s, and was also an organiser of the National Hunger March. In 1932, he was a founder of the British Anti-War Council, serving as its national secretary.

The NAFTA merged into the National Union of Furniture Trade Operatives (NUFTO), and Shube was appointed as its national convener for Co-operative Wholesale Society furniture and bedding workers, also serving as the union's president from 1947. In 1952, Shube was elected as one of NUFTO's two full-time assistant general secretaries, focusing his time on the union's finances and administration. In 1971, it amalgamated into the Furniture, Timber and Allied Trades Union (FTAT), Shube continuing as assistant general secretary until 1975, when he was elected as its general secretary. He died in office, in 1978.

Trade union offices
Preceded by Alf Tomkins	General Secretary of the Furniture, Timber and Allied Trades Union; 1975–1978	Succeeded by Ben Rubner
