= Lewis Leckie =

British trade union leader

Lewis Leckie (1865 or 1866 – 20 March 1923) was a British trade union leader.

Leckie worked as an upholsterer in the East End of London. In 1888 he joined the West London Society of Upholsterers, but the following year, he founded a new East End Society of Upholsterers. He took the society into the Amalgamated Union of Upholsterers (AUU), and in 1894 he became the secretary of a new branch of the union, catering for piece workers. He was highly successful, and the union's London branches decided to collectively employ him as a full-time organiser.

In 1898, Leckie was appointed general secretary of the AUU, initially on a part-time basis. He was able to increase membership sufficiently that, by 1901, he became the union's first full-time general secretary.

As leader of the union, Leckie affiliated it to the Labour Representation Committee. He also tried to arrange a merger between it, the National Amalgamated Furnishing Trades Association (NAFTA), the Amalgamated Union of Cabinetmakers and the Amalgamated Society of French Polishers, but discussions in both 1909 and 1913 failed as agreement could not be reached on levels of membership fees and benefits. In 1918, he transformed the union by admitting all workers in the industry, regardless of perceived level of skill, and for the first time including women.

Early in the 1920s, Leckie's health declined, and he died early in 1923 while still in office. His memoirs were published by the union the following year.

Trade union offices
Preceded by W. Watson	General Secretary of the Amalgamated Union of Upholsterers; 1897–1923	Succeeded by E. W. Wilsdon
