= John Davenport =

John or Jack Davenport may refer to:

== Sports ==
- Jack A. Davenport (1931–1951), boxer
- John Davenport (rally driver), co-winner of the 1968 RAC Rally and British Leyland's Director of Motorsport from the end of 1976.
- John Davenport (baseball), born 1922, American baseball player in 1954 New York Giants (MLB) season
- John Davenport (long jumper) (born 1955), American long jumper, 1975 All-American for the Maryland Terrapins track and field team

== Politicians ==
- John Davenport (Connecticut politician) (1752–1830), U.S. Representative from Connecticut, 1799–1816
- John Davenport (industrialist) (1765–1848), British pottery manufacturer and member of parliament for Stoke-upon-Trent, 1832–1841
- John Davenport (Ohio politician) (1788–1855), U.S. Representative from Ohio, 1827–1828

== Others ==
- Jack Davenport (born 1973), British actor
- John Davenport (minister) (1597–1670), Puritan minister and colonist in New Haven Colony
- John Davenport (orientalist) (1789–1877), British orientalist scholar
- John Davenport (trade unionist) (died 1941), British trade unionist
- Otis Blackwell (1932–2002), musician who used the pseudonym John Davenport
- John M. Davenport (1842–1913), Church of England clergyman and writer
- John Thistlewood Davenport (1817–1901), English pharmacist and businessman
- John Davenport (economic journalist) (1904–1987)
- John Davenport (journalist), former host of Washington Week
- John Davenport (critic) (1908–1966), British poet and critic

== See also ==
- John Davenport Siddeley, 1st Baron Kenilworth (1866–1956), automobile pioneer
