= United Order of General Labourers =

Former trade union of the United Kingdom

The United Order of General Labourers was a trade union representing labourers, mostly in the construction industry, in the United Kingdom.

The union was founded in 1878 in London, initially as a very small organisation - by 1887, it had only 64 members. However, it then grew rapidly, reaching 1,386 members in 1896, and 3,660 in 1900. Initially known as the United Order of General Labourers of London, at the end of World War I, it became the United Order of General Labourers of Great Britain and Ireland.

In 1902, the union took part in a merger conference with the Navvies, Bricklayers' Labourers and General Labourers Union, the Hull and District Builders' Labourers Union, the National Amalgamated Union of Labour, the London Amalgamated Plumbers' Mates Society, the United Builders' Labourers Union and the National Union of Gas Workers and General Labourers. The meetings lasted several months, but no agreement was reached, and a legacy of distrust between the unions resulted.

In 1920, the union participated in a merger conference organised by the National Federation of Building Trades Operatives, also attended by three of its major rivals: the National Association of Builders' Labourers, the United Builders' Labourers Union, and the Navvies', Bricklayers' Labourers' and General Labourers' Union. This was not successful, as the United Order had little interest in merging with these unions. Instead, it affiliated to the National Transport Workers' Federation and, in 1924, it merged into the Transport and General Workers' Union in 1924.

The union's general secretary from 1913 until 1924 was John Davenport.

== See also ==
- List of trade unions
- Transport and General Workers' Union
- TGWU amalgamations
