= Arthur Eades =

British trade unionist

Arthur Eades (17 December 1863 – 3 November 1933) was a British trade unionist.

Born in Enfield, Eades' father died when he was a young child, following which the family moved to Birmingham. He began working as a half-timer at the age of eight, then later completed an apprenticeship as a cabinet maker. He was also known as a marksman and won numerous prizes for his rifle shooting.

In 1888, Eades joined the Alliance Cabinet Makers' Society, and became president of his branch soon after. He was a leading figure in advocating for higher wages, and also represented his union at the Birmingham Trades Council, becoming vice-president in 1893, and then president in 1895. In 1896, he became secretary of his union branch, and in 1898 also secretary of the trades council. In this role he led the organising committee which established the National Committee of Organised Labour for Promoting Old Age Pensions for All.

In 1893, Eades stood unsuccessfully for Birmingham City Council as an independent labour candidate. He was also unsuccessful as a Trades Council candidate for the Birmingham School Board in 1896, but won election as an independent in 1897, and served on it for many years. He raised funds for scholarships to the University of Birmingham, and became the only working class member of its Board of Governors.

Although Eades was willing to work with the Labour Representation Committee founded in 1900, he was unenthusiastic about it. From 1902, he focused his time on the Birmingham Co-operative Society, retiring from the secretaryship of the trades council in 1903. In 1904, he ran his final unsuccessful campaign for a seat on the city council, as a conventional Liberal Party candidate, opposed by the trades council, although he remained a delegate to it for many years.

Trade union offices
Preceded by C. C. Cooke	President of Birmingham Trades Council; 1895–1898	Succeeded by Henry Simpson
Preceded by S. G. Middleton	Secretary of Birmingham Trades Council; 1898–1903	Succeeded by J. E. Berry
