= Alfred Gould =

Alfred Gould may refer to:

- Alfred Gould (trade unionist)
- Alfred Gould (surgeon)
