= Alex Gossip =

Scottish trade union leader and political activist

- Born: Alexander Gossip; 11 September 1862; Crawford Priory, Fife, Scotland, United Kingdom
- Died: 14 May 1952 (aged 89); United Kingdom
- Education: Madras College
- Occupation: Cabinet maker
- Years active: 1870s-1940
- Organization: NAFTA
- Political party: Labour Party
- Other political affiliations: ILP
- Movement: Socialism

Alex Gossip (11 September 1862 – 14 May 1952) was a Scottish trade union leader and political activist.

== Biography ==
Born at Crawford Priory in Fife, where his father was head gardener, Gossip was educated at Madras Academy, leaving at the age of fourteen to complete an apprenticeship as a cabinet-maker. On completing this, he joined the United Operative Cabinet and Chairmakers' Society of Scotland, soon becoming its assistant general secretary. Through his trade union activity, he befriended Keir Hardie, who converted him to socialism.

Gossip was a founding member of the Independent Labour Party (ILP) in 1893. Three years later, he moved to Glasgow, where he became involved in the Socialist Sunday School movement. In 1901, he was elected as his union's general secretary, and immediately negotiated a merger between it and its English equivalent, the Alliance Cabinet Makers' Association, to form the National Amalgamated Furnishing Trades Association (NAFTA). Gossip served as its assistant general secretary, moving to London, then in 1906 succeeded as general secretary.

Gossip was influential in persuading NAFTA to affiliate to the Labour Representation Committee as early as 1903. During the early years of the century, he became increasingly involved in international campaigns, attending the Second International's conferences in 1904 and 1907, and was on the executive of the International Woodworkers' Federation from 1910 until 1922. He was also the first president of the National Council of Socialist Sunday Schools.

Gossip opposed World War I, working closely with NAFTA's national organiser, Fred Bramley, to commit the union to his position. He strongly supported the October Revolution, but was not a Marxist and so decided not to join the Communist Party of Great Britain (CPGB). Despite this, he consistently championed CPGB positions within the ILP, the Trades Union Congress and the Labour Party, and was one of only a few non-CPGB members to join the National Minority Movement and the National Left Wing Movement. He also served on the first executive of the League Against Imperialism, and repeatedly called for the CPGB to be permitted to affiliate to the Labour Party. When the CPGB adopted Third Period policies of breaking with existing trade unions, he was unhappy, and spoke out against their claims that unorganised workers had a more revolutionary character.

Facing poor health, Gossip retired as NAFTA general secretary in 1940, moving to Cupar.

Trade union offices
Preceded by Harry Ham	General Secretary of the National Amalgamated Furnishing Trades Association; 1905 – 1941	Succeeded by Alf Tomkins
