= Luke Fawcett =

British trade unionist

Sir Luke Fawcett (1881–25 October 1960) was a British trade unionist.

Born in North Thoresby in Lincolnshire, Fawcett served an apprenticeship as a bricklayer, and immediately became an active trade unionist, becoming secretary of the Manchester Federation of Building Trades Operatives. He became increasingly concerned by the casualisation in the industry. In 1934, he became the first full-time President of the Amalgamated Union of Building Trade Workers

Fawcett was the General Secretary of the Amalgamated Union of Building Trade Workers from 1941 until 1952. He then became President of the National Federation of Building Trades Operatives, and Chairman of the Southern Regional Board for Industry. He received the OBE in 1943, and a knighthood in 1948.

Trade union offices
Preceded by George Waddell	President of the Amalgamated Union of Building Trade Workers; 1934 – 1942	Succeeded by Harry Adams
Preceded by George Hicks	General Secretary of the Amalgamated Union of Building Trade Workers; 1941 – 1952	Succeeded by George Lowthian
Preceded by Harry N. Harrison	Chairman of the Trades Councils' Joint Consultative Committee; 1947 – 1953	Succeeded by Tom O'Brien
