= Birmingham Trades Council =

Birmingham Trades Council is the trades council body which brings together trade unionists from across Birmingham, England. Its headquarters were formerly in Digbeth, with a huge mural above the canteen area depicting the 1972 Battle of Saltley Gate.

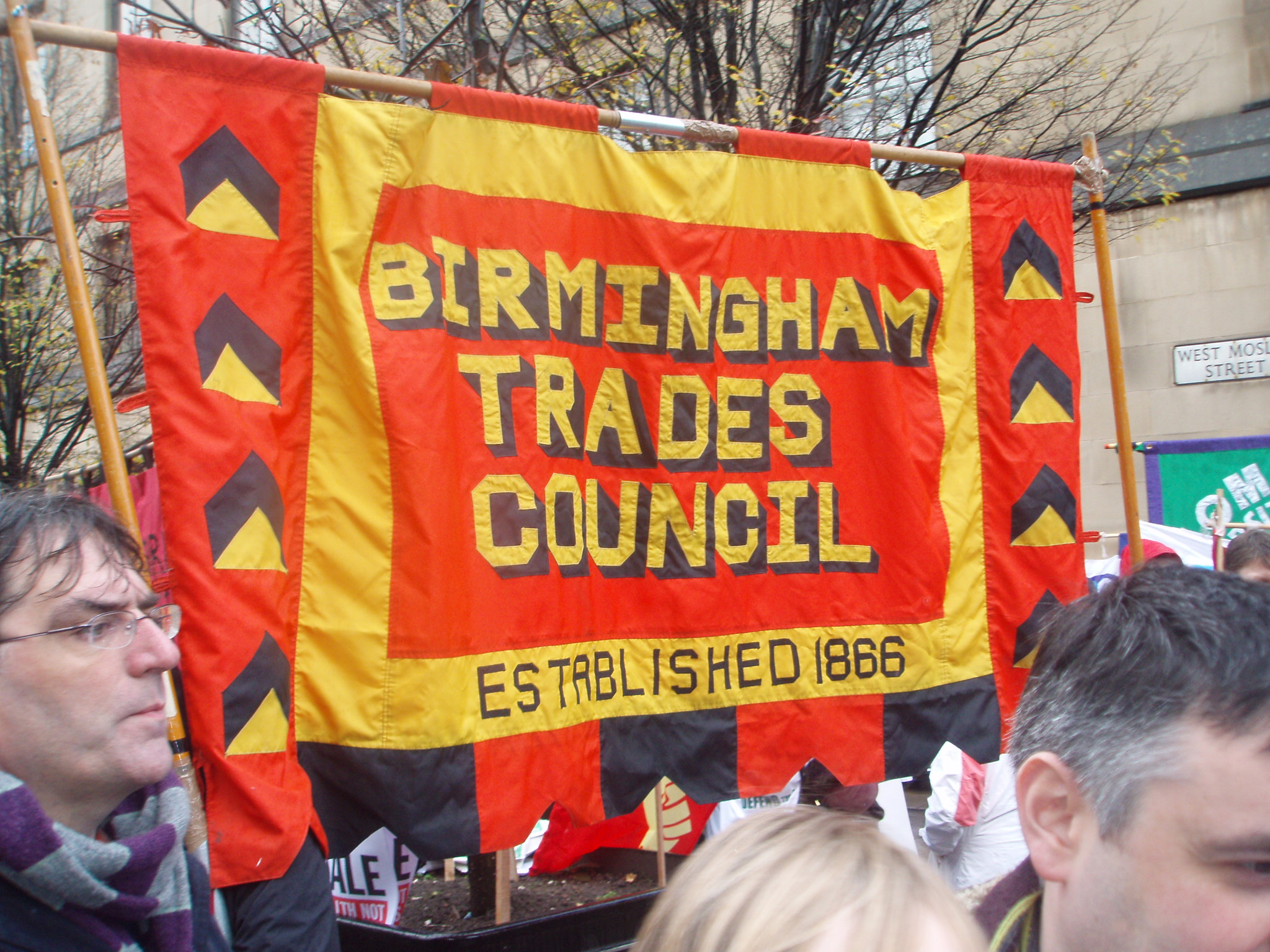
November 2007

== Secretaries ==
Start of term	Secretary	Union
1866	Roger Batson	General Union of Carpenters and Joiners
1867	Robert McRae	United Kingdom Society of Coach Builders
1869	William Gilliver	Cordwainers
1878	C. R. Bowkett	House Painters
1880	J. T. Harlow	Typographical Association
1881	Ben Church	Typographical Association
1885	A. Haddleton	Flint Glass Makers
1895	S. G. Middleton	School Workers' Union
1898	Arthur Eades	Alliance Cabinet Makers' Association
1903	J. E. Berry	Amalgamated Society of Lithographic Printers
1913	J. Kesterton	Typographical Association
1919	F. W. Rudland	Typographical Association
1940	C. G. Spragg	Painters
1944	Harry Baker	Draughtsmen and Allied Technicians' Association
1966	David Perris	Theatre and Cinema Workers
1983	Mick Rice	Amalgamated Engineering Union

== Presidents ==
1869: Thomas Green
1870:
1871: H. Giles
1874:
1875: C. R. Bowkett
1878: J. Lewis
1880: Allan Grainger
1887: John Valentine Stevens
1889: Alfred Jephcott
1892: C. C. Cooke
1895: Arthur Eades
1898: Henry Simpson
1899: Joseph Millington
1902:
1904: W. J. Morgan
1909:
1910: Joseph Kesterton
1912:
1914: E. E. Edwards
1916: G. Stanway
1917: F. W. Rudland
1919: F. E. Willis
1920: A. Shakespeare
1921: A. P. Cassidy
1922: H. G. Johnson
1924:
1929: H. G. Johnson
1933:
1937: C. G. Spragg
1939: Walter Samuel Lewis
1942: Ernest Haynes
1951: Bob Shorthouse
1955: George Varnom
1961: W. E. Jarvis
