= Thomas Otley =

British trade union leader

Thomas H. Otley (1861 – July 1922) was a British trade union leader.

Otley worked as a plasterer. His cousin, Arthur Otley, served as general secretary of the National Association of Operative Plasterers (NAOP), which Thomas joined in 1890. In 1896, Arthur resigned in protest at the appointment of an assistant general secretary, J. Lamb.

Lamb soon fell into conflict with the union's new general secretary, Michael Deller. After only three months, Thomas Otley replaced Lamb in the role, and worked closely with Deller.

Deller died in January 1906, and Otley was appointed as acting general secretary. He easily won election to the permanent post, in which he focused on administration and made few changes. The union was struggling financially, and in 1909 the assistant general secretary was made redundant. He did arrange for the purchase of a new head office, at 37 Albert Street in London.

From 1910, membership began increasing again, the Cork City Society of Plasterers joining the union, and the National Health Insurance Act 1911 giving it a key welfare role in the industry. The union also became a founder member of the National Federation of Building Trade Operatives, and Otley served on its Emergency Committee.

In July 1922, while on holiday, Otley went sea swimming. After leaving the water, he suffered a fatal heart attack.

Trade union offices
Preceded by J. Lamb	Assistant General Secretary of the National Association of Operative Plasterers; 1897–1906	Succeeded by Charles Brooks
Preceded by Michael Deller	General Secretary of the National Association of Operative Plasterers; 1906–1922	Succeeded by Arthur Henry Telling
