= Adrian Fawcett =

British businessperson

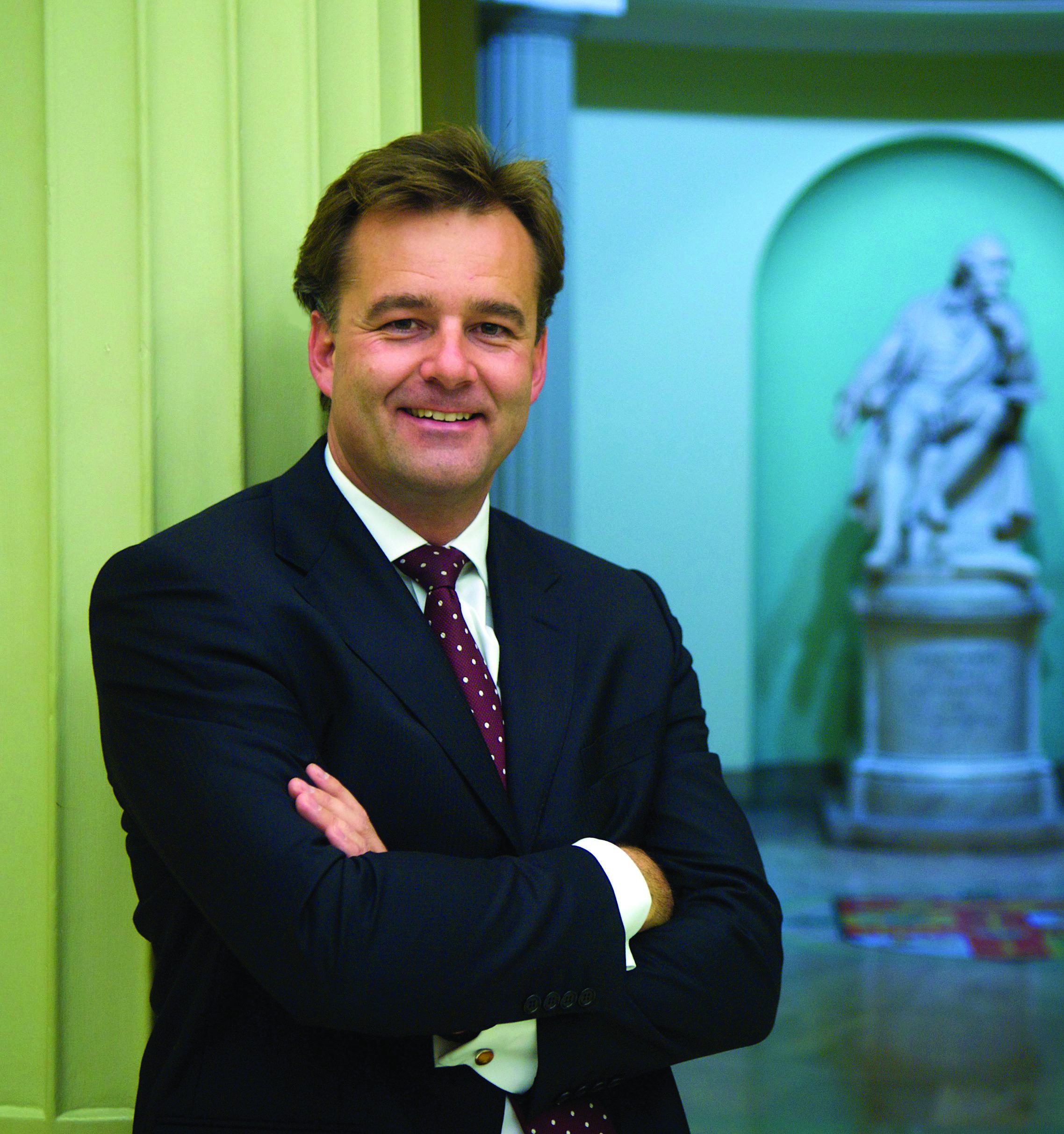
- Occupations: Chairman Silentnight Group, Park Holidays UK, Petainer, Advest Capital Management and related investments

Adrian Fawcett is Chairman of Silentnight Group Park Holidays UK Petainer Liberis Advest Capital Management and related investments.

As an economist, Adrian has also spent two terms of Government on the board of the Department for Work and Pensions. He is interested in business opportunities arising from dislocations created by changes in regulation or legislation in a sector. Sectors include financial, legal, packaging and healthcare.

His previous main roles include chairman at A R Metallizing, having successfully created the global leader in the metallized paper and packaging sector. The business was sold to Japanese listed company Nissha printing in September 2015- a market leading transaction. Adrian was chairman at Gala Bingo from November 2016 - May 2018 and also Chief Executive at General Healthcare Group 2007–2011, Chief Operating Officer at Punch Taverns, Chairman of Eurosite Power Advisory Board, Chairman of The Real Pub Company and a non-executive director at the Department for Work and Pensions

In 2014, Adrian was a finalist of the Sunday Times Non Executive Director of the Year In the same year he was also awarded an Honorary Doctorate from Birmingham City University and became a Primary Corporate Liveryman with the Furniture Makers' Company. He was awarded Business Insiders Entrepreneurial Director of the Year 2007 and in 2006 he was named Young Director of the Year by the Institute of Directors in the large business category and Brightest Entrepreneurial Talent by Business Insider magazine.

Adrian is a regular commentator, speaker and presenter on economy, consumer trends, business and sport at conferences and government events and was a keynote speaker at the 2014 Legal Futures Conference. He has often appeared in the media, such as BBC Radio 4's Any Questions? and The Bottom Line. and NHS- The Malthusian Challenge. He received national media coverage in the UK during the 2010 general election when he criticised a "wall of silence" from the main parties over health policy.

== Work at Silentnight Group ==
Adrian Fawcett successfully pursued the expansion of Silentnight's Barnoldswick plant, having migrated the premises from Batley to Barnoldswick while securing £1m from Lancashire County Council. This has led to the creation of 140 additional jobs, increasing its number of employees to 500, despite the downturn in the manufacturing industry. In May 2014 Prime Minister, David Cameron, paid tribute to Silentnight, joining Adrian in a visit to the Barnoldswick headquarters and factory as part of recognising UK manufacturing success stories.

== Work at Park Holidays UK ==
Adrian is Chairman of Park Holidays UK, an operator of Holiday and Caravan Parks in the UK. It has 26 parks around the south coast.

== Work at Petainer ==
Adrian is Chairman of Petainer Group, a plastic packaging business.

== Work at Advest Capital Management ==
Adrian is Chairman of Advest Capital Management.
