= Adam Weiler =

Adam Weiler (died 1894) was a German trade unionist and socialist activist, active in London.

Born in Germany, Weiler emigrated to London, where he found work as a cabinetmaker. He joined the International Working Men's Association, serving on its British Federal Council in 1872–3, and supporting Karl Marx and Friedrich Engels' campaign against reformers. He maintained a friendship with Marx throughout the 1870s, the two corresponding by letter.

During the 1870s, Weiler served on the executive of the Alliance Cabinet Makers' Association. In 1875, the union decided to test the Criminal Law Amendment Act, 1871's provisions on picketing, leading to the imprisonment of five leading members of the union. Weiler represented the union on the London Trades Council, and was one of three delegates that body appointed to state the case for prisoners' defence. He also attended several meetings of the Trades Union Congress.

By 1884, Weiler was a member of the Manhood Suffrage League, and frequently spoke at meetings of various radical clubs in London. When the league joined the Social Democratic Federation, he became a member of that organisation.
