= United Operative Cabinet and Chairmakers' Society of Scotland =

Scottish furniture industry trade union

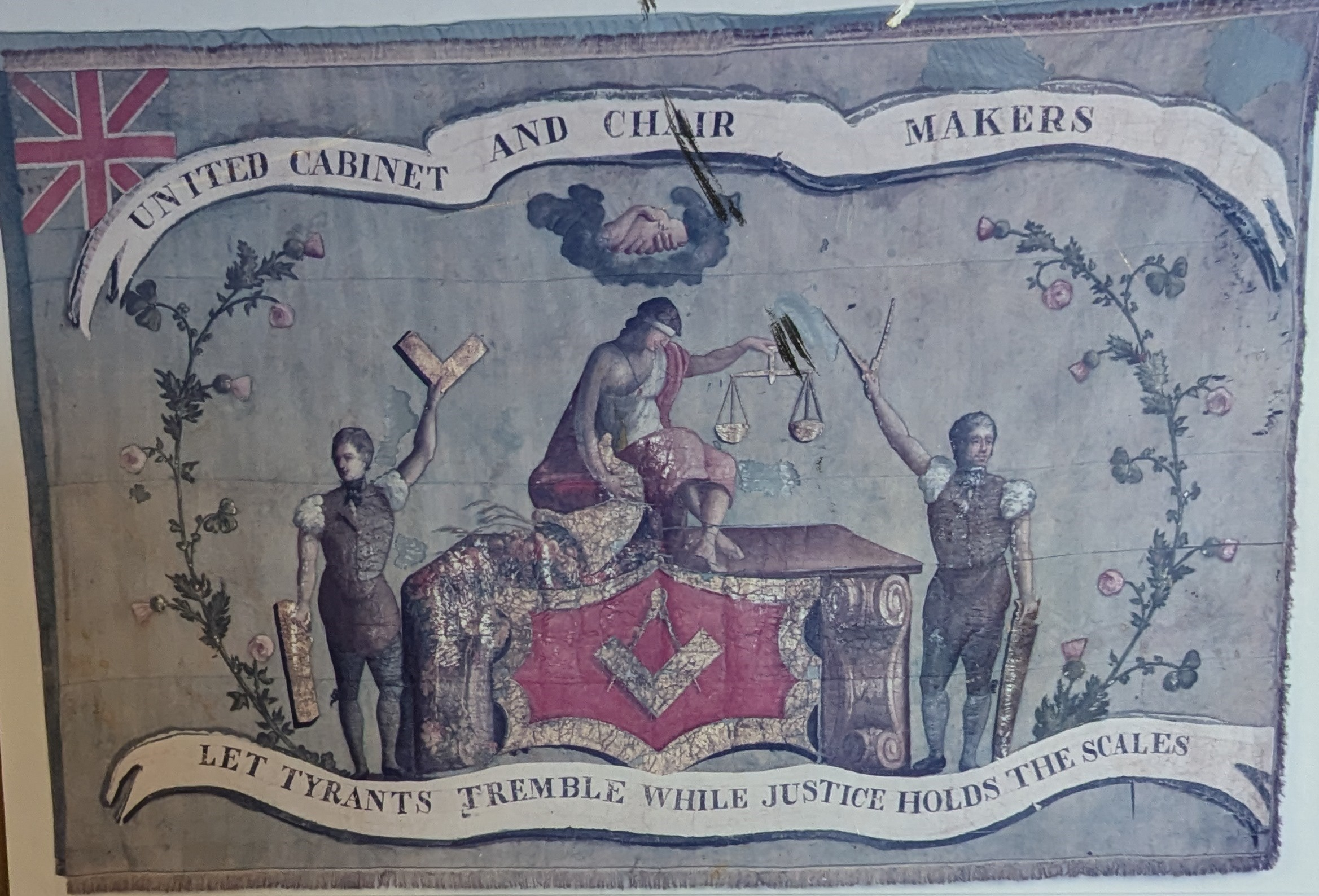
Flag with the union's emblem

The United Operative Cabinet and Chairmakers Society of Scotland was a trade union representing furniture makers in Scotland.

The union was founded in 1875, bringing together local unions based in Glasgow and Beith. In the 1880s, Alex Gossip became its assistant general secretary, then in 1896 its general secretary. By that year, it had grown to have 1,812 members.

In 1893, the English Alliance Cabinet Makers Association (ACMA) supported the union in a wage dispute in Clydeside. This led the two to open merger negotiations, but it emerged that as the Scottish union was not registered with the government, it was not legally permitted to merge with the registered English union. The Scottish union had to change its constitution and register with the UK government. However, in 1898, employers formed the National Federation of Furniture Makers of Scotland, which attempted to impose 12 demands, in opposition to the union. The dispute exhausted the funds of the union, but with the support of the ACMA it maintained its organisation and most of its membership.

The union finally merged with ACMA in 1902, forming the National Amalgamated Furnishing Trades Association.
