= Altogether Builders' Labourers and Constructional Workers' Society =

Former trade union of the United Kingdom

- Merged into: Transport and General Workers' Union
- Dissolved: 1934
- Headquarters: 11 South Hill Park, Hampstead
- Location: United Kingdom

The Altogether Builders' Labourers and Constructional Workers' Society was a trade union representing labourers in the construction industry in the United Kingdom.

The union originated around the turn of 1889 and 1890 as the National Association of Builders' Labourers, and by 1892 had a membership of more than 2,000 workers. However, it split into local unions in 1893, and ceased to operate nationally. In 1907, the Hull and District Builders' Labourers Union re-established the National Association, with twenty-five local unions joining, giving a membership of 2,866.

The union affiliated to the National Federation of Building Trades Operatives, which organised a merger conference between it and its three main rivals: the United Builders' Labourers Union, the United Order of General Labourers of Great Britain and Ireland, and the Navvies', Bricklayers' Labourers' and General Labourers' Union. This was not successful; the Navvies and the United Order had little interest in amalgamation, while the National and the United Builders could not agree on a way forward. In response, the National Association reformed as the "Altogether Builders' Labourers and Constructional Workers Society". It merged into the Transport and General Workers' Union in 1934.

== General Secretaries ==
1907: Patrick Flanagan
1921: S. Taylor
1928: Tom Pugh
