= National Association of Operative Plasterers =

UK trade union

- Merged into: Transport and General Workers' Union
- Founded: 1860
- Dissolved: 1968
- Headquarters: 1016 Harrow Road, Wembley
- Location: United Kingdom
- Members: 7,388 (1907)
- Affiliations: TUC, ITUC, NFBTO, Labour

The National Association of Operative Plasterers (NAOP) was a trade union representing plasterers in the United Kingdom.

The union was founded in 1860 and regarded itself as an amalgamation of three local societies. It immediately attracted a high membership for a union of the time, having 4,802 members in 1866, and although this fell to 2,400 by the end of the decade, it rose to 5,199 in 1876, representing nearly 20% of the total workforce.

In 1895, both the Liverpool Operative Plasters' Trade, Accident and Burial Society, and the Metropolitan Trades Society of Operative Plasterers merged in, taking membership to 11,000, and a three-month strike in 1898 produced a national agreement on wages and working conditions.

The union joined the National Federation of Building Trade Operatives in 1918, under the name of the National Association of Plasterers, Granolithic and Cement Workers. It left the federation in 1924, but rejoined in 1933. The Scottish National Operative Plasterers' Union finally amalgamated into the NAOP in 1967.

In 1968, the union merged into the Transport and General Workers' Union.

== Election results ==
The union sponsored its Bristol-area organiser as a Labour Party candidate in the 1929 UK general election:

Constituency	Candidate	Votes	Percentage	Position
Stroud	F. E. White	10,384	26.1	3

== Leadership ==
=== General Secretaries ===
1861: C. O. Williams
1885: John Knight
1885: Arthur Otley
1896: Michael Deller
1906: Thomas Otley
1922: Arthur Henry Telling
1950: Albert Dunne

=== Assistant General Secretaries ===
1896: J. Lamb
1897: Thomas Otley
1906: Charles Brooks
1909: Post vacant
1920: Arthur Henry Telling
1923: Henry Cockerill
1942: John Lane
1943: Post vacant
1946: Albert Dunne
1950: Ronald V. Gough

== See also ==
- List of trade unions
- Transport and General Workers' Union
- TGWU amalgamations
