= Dick Coppock =

British trade unionist and politician (1885–1971)

Sir Richard Coppock CBE (21 February 1885 – 7 September 1971) was a British trade unionist and politician.

Born in Cheetham in Manchester, Coppock left school at eleven and followed his father in becoming an apprentice bricklayer two years later. During this period, he also became a member of the Social Democratic Federation (SDF). He supervised the construction of the Socialist Hall built by members of the Openshaw Socialist Society in 1907.

On completing his apprenticeship, he joined the Operative Bricklayers' Society and became an active trade unionist. He served as a full-time branch secretary from 1911, then divisional organiser in 1916. He was active on the Manchester and Salford Trades Council, and became a magistrate before he was thirty.

Coppock opposed World War I, during which he was active in Independent Labour Party (ILP), through which he became friends with Harry Pollitt. He was elected to Manchester City Council in 1919, serving for two years, and he also stood unsuccessfully to become secretary of the Amalgamated Union of Building Trade Workers, successor to the Operative Bricklayers, but was beaten by George Hicks.

However, in 1920, he was narrowly elected as secretary of the National Federation of Building Trade Operatives, which brought together various builders' trade unions. As a result, he moved to London. The federation during his first decade had few successes, and Coppock devoted some of his time to promoting the Building Guilds movement, but in 1934 he was central to forming the International Federation of Building and Wood Workers, and was its first president. He also founded the Dick Coppock cup, famously played for in East London ().

In 1925, Coppock was elected to London County Council as an alderman, serving for six years, then in 1934 he was elected to represent Limehouse. He was vice-chairman of the council in 1939/40, and chairman in 1943/44, after which he once more became an alderman, serving until 1965. While on the LCC, he made a major contribution to development of the Green Belt around London, working with James Chuter Ede of the Surrey County Council and others on determining the land to be conserved.

He gave one of the orations at Pollitt's funeral in 1960, and retired from his trade union posts in 1961.

Coppock was made a Commander of the Order of the British Empire in 1942, and was awarded a knighthood in 1951.

Trade union offices
Preceded by Bill Bradshaw	Secretary of the National Federation of Building Trade Operatives; 1920–1961	Succeeded by Harry Weaver
Preceded by New position	President of the International Federation of Building and Wood Workers; 1934–1960	Succeeded by Dore Smets
Civic offices
Preceded by Alfred Baker	Chairman of the London County Council; 1943–1944	Succeeded by Somerville Hastings
