= George H. Lowthian =

British trade unionist

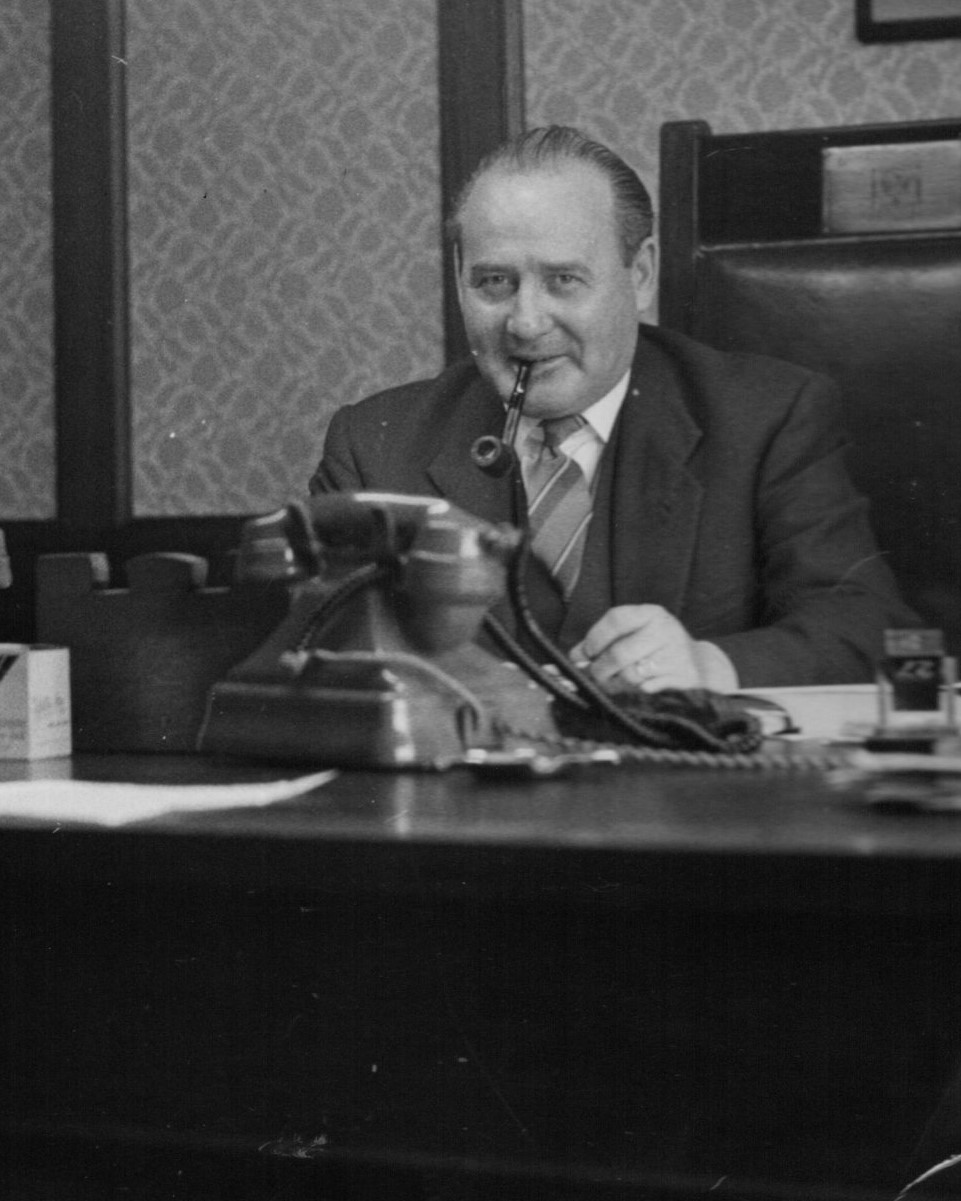
George Lowthian, 1965

George Henry Lowthian (born 30 January 1908 in Carlisle, Cumberland; died 11 June 1986 in Sutton, Surrey) was a British trade unionist.

Lowthian entered the building trade at the age of sixteen, and completed his apprenticeship four years later, immediately joining the Amalgamated Union of Building Trade Workers, and was elected as a branch secretary the following year. He studied extensively with the National Council of Labour Colleges.

Lowthian rapidly rose through the union, attending its conference from 1936, and joining the executive council in 1940. He became a full-time union official in 1945, as a divisional secretary, and was elected as the union's general secretary in 1950. He served on the General Council of the Trades Union Congress (TUC) for 21 years, and served as President of the TUC in 1964.

In 1971, Lowthian led his union into a merger which produced the Union of Construction, Allied Trades and Technicians. He spent two years as the secretary of the building section of the new union, before retiring. He maintained links with the trade union movement, including serving as a trustee of the Miners' Hardship Fund, until his death in 1985.

Trade union offices
Preceded by Luke Fawcett	General Secretary of the Amalgamated Union of Building Trade Workers; 1950–1971	Succeeded by Position abolished
Preceded by Frederick Hayday	President of the Trades Union Congress; 1964	Succeeded by Harold Collison
Preceded by Harry Douglass and Anne Godwin	Trades Union Congress representative to the AFL-CIO; 1965; With: William Carron	Succeeded by Jack Cooper and Harry Nicholas
