= United Operative Masons' Association of Scotland =

Former trade union of the United Kingdom

- Merged into: Building and Monumental Workers' Association of Scotland
- Founded: 1831
- Dissolved: 1919
- Headquarters: Glasgow
- Location: Scotland
- Members: 13,759 (1878)

The United Operative Masons' Association of Scotland was a trade union representing stonemasons in Scotland. Active for nearly ninety years, its membership and importance varied greatly over time; at its peak, it represented the large majority of stonemasons in the country.

The union was founded in Aberdeen in 1831, and by the end of the decade had fifteen branches including Glasgow and Edinburgh. However, most were very small, and in 1840 it had only 433 members. Despite this, it had strong financial reserves, and in 1841 it donated £500 to the Operative Society of Masons, Quarrymen and Allied Trades of England and Wales, which enabled it to remain on strike and eventually win a partial victory in a dispute relating to the construction of the Houses of Parliament.

Each branch operated largely autonomously, and this led to serious disagreements between the Aberdeen and Glasgow branches. The Aberdeen branch broke away in 1842, forming the rival Northern Union of Operative Masons. By 1846, most members had left the United Operatives, and the union nearly collapsed. However, the Glasgow branch remained operational, and in 1851 it re-established the union on a national basis, with the support of the English and Welsh union.

The reorganised union proved far more successful, growing to 3,000 members by 1855, and peaking at 13,759 members in 1878, organised in 116 branches. By then, it had built up reserves of £18,000, but had most invested in the City of Glasgow Bank, and lost them when the bank collapsed.

In an effort to rebuild, the union registered with the government in 1879, but it wished to have more freedom to change its rules, and so deregistered just three years later. Its membership gradually declined, falling to 11,000 by 1896, but then went into a more rapid decline, as the rival United Operative Masons' and Granite Cutters' Union attracted potential members. By 1907, membership had fallen to just 1,769, but it did increase a little during World War I.

The Trades Union Congress was unhappy that there were two rival stonemasons' unions in Scotland, and in 1919 it persuaded the United Operatives to merge with the Granite Cutters, along with the smaller Associated Paviors' Federal Union, and Scottish Amalgamated Society of Mosaic and Encaustic Tile Fixers, Marble Workers and Fireplace Builders. They formed the Building and Monumental Workers' Association of Scotland.

== Central Corresponding Secretaries ==
1855: John M'Neill
1855: R. Willox
1860: John Paton
1862: James Hart
1866: D. McLaren
1867: Matthew Allan
1883: Thomas Walker
1885: John Craig
1895: G. B. Craig
1911: William Gordon
1913: J. F. Armour and H. Macpherson
