= Furniture, Timber and Allied Trades Union =

Former trade union of the United Kingdom

FTAT
- Furniture, Timber and Allied Trades Union
- Merged into: GMB
- Founded: 1971
- Dissolved: 1993
- Headquarters: Roe Green, Kingsbury, London
- Location: United Kingdom
- Members: 85,377 (1971)
- Publication: FTAT Record
- Affiliations: TUC, CSEU, Labour Party

The Furniture, Timber and Allied Trades Union (FTAT) was a trade union in the United Kingdom.

== History ==
The union was founded in 1971 by the merger of the National Union of Furniture Trade Operatives (NUFTO) and the Amalgamated Society of Woodcutting Machinists. In 1978, the National Union of Funeral Service Operatives merged with it, while the National Society of Brushmakers and General Workers joined in 1983. The following year, its total membership was 85,407. The union was a member of the Confederation of Shipbuilding and Engineering Unions.

Initially, the union had six trade groups, reduced to five in the 1980s: upholstery, soft furnishing and bedding, woodcutting machinists, funeral services, flat glass and processing, and supervisory and clerical.

The union was known for its left-wing outlook, inherited from NUFTO. In the 1981 Labour Party deputy leadership election, it supported Tony Benn. Some of FTAT's Silentnight members, based in Barnoldswick, were involved in Britain's longest ever strike, from 1985 until 1987.

By 1993, membership was down to 31,642, and the union merged with the GMB, forming the bulk of its new "Construction, Furniture, Timber and Allied" section.

== Election results ==
The union sponsored Labour Party candidates in several Parliamentary elections.

Election	Constituency	Candidate	Votes	Percentage	Position
1974 Feb general election	Hackney South and Shoreditch	Ronald Brown	18,580	59.6	1
1974 Feb general election	Wycombe	William Frederick Back	18,822	29.5	2
1974 Oct general election	Hackney South and Shoreditch	Ronald Brown	17,333	64.0	1
1974 Oct general election	Wycombe	William Frederick Back	18,052	30.8	2
1979 general election	Hackney South and Shoreditch	Ronald Brown	14,016	54.1	1

== General Secretaries ==
1971: Alf Tomkins
1975: Robert Shube
1978: Ben Rubner
1986: Colin Christopher
