= Openshaw Socialist Society =

The Openshaw Socialist Society (OSS) was a working class socialist organisation established by members of the Independent Labour Party (ILP) in the Openshaw area of Manchester. Under the guidance of Dick Coppock they built their own hall in Margaret Street, Openshaw which was completed in 1907. During the First World War the OSS maintained an anti war position. When the ILP as a whole voted not to affiliate with the Communist International at their 1921 annual conference, the OSS left the ILP becoming the Openshaw Branch of the Communist Party of Great Britain.

== Notable members ==
- Mary Louisa Pollitt (1868–1939)
