= Leslie Merrion =

British trade unionist, broadcaster and politician (1904–1975)

Leslie Charles Merrion (5 February 1904 – 1975) was a British trade unionist, broadcaster and politician.

== Career ==
Merrion was born on 5 February 1904, in Camberwell. He played football in his youth. He left school at age fourteen and found work in a factory, but was sacked due to his focus on football. In 1920, he found work as a bricklayer, but suffered a serious illness in 1922. While recovering, he became interested in politics, joining the Labour Party, and also the Amalgamated Union of Building Trade Workers. He won election to Enfield Borough Council, and served for periods as secretary and then chair of the Enfield Labour Party.

In the run-up to World War II, Merrion was involved in constructing air raid shelters across London, and he was invited to speak about this on the radio. The BBC was trialing putting "ordinary people" on the radio, and Merrion was perhaps the most popular, thereafter featuring regularly on programmes including The Brains Trust, and even presenting a series of the Week in Westminster.

At the 1950 UK general election, Merrion stood as a Labour Party candidate in Portsmouth South, with sponsorship from his union; he took 36.1% of the vote and was not elected. He then stood in Southend East in 1951, and Exeter at the 1955 UK general election, on both occasions increasing the party's vote share, but taking second place.

In the 1966 New Year Honours, Merrion was made a Member of the Order of the British Empire. He died in 1975, aged 70 or 71.
