= United French Polishers' Society =

Former trade union of the United Kingdom

- Successor: National Union of Furniture Trade Operatives
- Formation: 1901
- Defunct: 1969
- Type: Trade union
- Headquarters: London, United Kingdom
- Region served: United Kingdom
- Affiliations: Labour Party; Trades Union Congress

The United French Polishers' Society was a trade union representing french polishers in the United Kingdom.

== History ==
The union was founded in 1901, and appears to have largely consisted of members who split away from the Amalgamated Society of French Polishers of Great Britain and Ireland. Initially, it had 1,478 members based in ten branches, all in London. In 1903, 148 members split away to form the rival Old Alliance Society of French Polishers, but that union was not successful and rejoined in 1908.

The union affiliated to the Labour Party and the Trades Union Congress. It was reluctant to merge into the National Amalgamated Furnishing Trades Association (NAFTA), the main union for the industry. In 1969, it finally merged into NAFTA's successor, the National Union of Furniture Trade Operatives.

== General Secretaries ==
1901: E. J. Rudd
1937: G. L. Richards
1952: J. E. Banham
1959: W. C. Clifton
