= National Society of Street Masons, Paviors and Road Makers =

Former trade union of the United Kingdom

- Merged into: Amalgamated Union of Building Trade Workers
- Founded: 1890
- Dissolved: 1966
- Headquarters: 1 Kingston Grove, Woodhouse Lane, Leeds
- Location: United Kingdom
- Members: 1,400 (1966)
- Affiliations: TUC, NFBTO

The National Society of Street Masons, Paviors and Road Makers was a trade union representing pavers in the United Kingdom.

The union was founded in 1890 as the Amalgamated Union of Street Masons, Paviors, Stone Dressers and Rammermen. It had 687 members by the end of the year, but this dropped rapidly, to only 97 in 1892. Membership then began increasing once more.

In 1896, the union was renamed as the United Street Masons, Paviors and Stone Dressers Society of Great Britain and Ireland, while in 1899 it became the Street Masons, Paviors, Stone and Sett Dressers Society. Membership peaked at 893 in 1900, then began a gradual decline again. The union became the Amalgamated Operative Street Masons, Paviors, Stone and Sett Dressers Society of Great Britain and Ireland in 1913, and the National Amalgamated Operative Street Masons, Paviors and Roadmakers Society of Great Britain and Ireland in 1919.

In 1914, Arthur Gill became general secretary of the union, and he served in the post for forty years. Under his leadership, the union was a founder member of the National Federation of Building Trade Operatives.

By 1966, the union had 1,400 members. That year, it merged into the Amalgamated Union of Building Trade Workers.

== General Secretaries ==
1890s: William Crew
1914: Arthur Gill
1954: W. Armitage
