= John Ward (trade unionist) =

British Army officer, politician & trade unionist (1866–1934)

Lieutenant-Colonel John Ward CB CMG

Member of Parliament for Stoke-upon-Trent
- In office 1906–1918
- Preceded by: Douglas Harry Coghill
- Succeeded by: Constituency abolished

Member of Parliament for Stoke
- In office 1918–1929
- Preceded by: New constituency
- Succeeded by: Lady Cynthia Mosley

Personal details
- Born: 21 November 1866 Oatlands, Surrey, England
- Died: 19 December 1934 (aged 68) Weyhill, Hampshire, England
- Party: Liberal
- Awards: Companion of the Order of St Michael and St George (1918); Companion of the Order of the Bath (1919); Croix de Guerre

Lieutenant-Colonel John Ward CB CMG (21 November 1866 – 19 December 1934) was an English Liberal Party politician, trade union leader and soldier.

== Early life ==
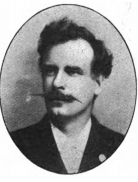
Ward in the 1890s

Ward was born at Oatlands, Weybridge, Surrey, the son of Robert and Caroline Ward. His father, a plasterer, died when he was three and he and his mother moved back to her home village of Appleshaw, near Andover, Hampshire. He had no real education and began working at a variety of odd jobs when he was seven years old. At the age of twelve he began work as a navvy on the Andover and Weyhill Railway, lodging with a man in Weyhill. He continued working as a navvy on jobs all over the country, including the Manchester Ship Canal, for the next seven years. It was only during this time that he learned to read and write.

In 1885, he enlisted in the British Army and served in the Sudan campaign, where he worked on the uncompleted military railway from Suakin to Berber. He was now becoming increasingly interested in politics and in 1886 joined the new Social Democratic Federation. On 9 November 1886 he took part in the meeting in Trafalgar Square which had been specially organised by the SDF to test the legality of the proclamation of Sir Charles Warren, the Commissioner of Police of the Metropolis, that demonstrations of the unemployed could not be held there. He was arrested, but due to his military record escaped with a fine.

== Pre-war trade union and political career ==
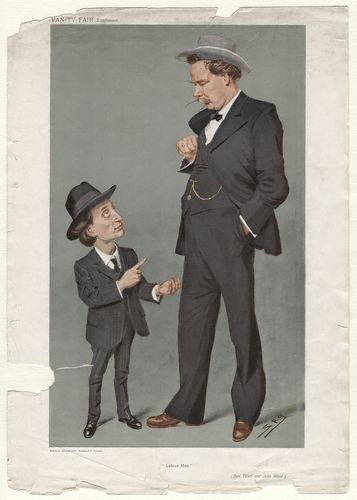
Benjamin Tillett and John Ward caricatured by Spy for Vanity Fair, 1908

In 1889, Ward founded the Navvies, Bricklayers' Labourers and General Labourers' Union, and continued to serve as its general secretary throughout its existence. He was also a co-founder of the short-lived National Federation of Labour Union the same year. In 1901, he was elected to the management committee of the new General Federation of Trade Unions and served on it until 1929; from 1913 he was its treasurer.

In 1892, Ward married Lilian Elizabeth Gibbs. They had three sons and a daughter. Lilian Ward died on 14 December 1926.

In 1888 and 1892 Ward unsuccessfully stood as an SDF candidate in local elections. He was prominent in the National Democratic League founded in 1900. In 1906 he was elected to the House of Commons as Liberal–Labour Member of Parliament (MP) for Stoke-upon-Trent, having refused to sign the Labour Representation Committee constitution three years earlier. He never joined the Labour Party and took the Liberal Party whip.

== First World War ==
When the First World War broke out in 1914, Ward rejoined the Army, this time as a commissioned officer in the Middlesex Regiment. Using his connections in the labour movement, he recruited five labour battalions and in 1915 raised and became commanding officer of a pioneer battalion, the 25th Battalion, Middlesex Regiment (known as "The Navvies' Battalion" and later to become known as the "Diehards"), with the rank of lieutenant-colonel. He commanded the battalion in France for a short period, but was then ordered to the Far East. On the voyage, on 8 February 1917, the troopship Tyndareus hit a mine off the coast of South Africa. He acquitted himself extremely well in this incident, keeping his composure throughout as he organised the evacuation of his men in the lifeboats. The battalion later continued with its voyage, serving as garrison troops in Hong Kong and the Straits Settlements.

Ward and his battalion were then sent to Siberia to support the White forces of Admiral Kolchak during the Russian Civil War. They were originally only intended for garrison duty, but soon found themselves in the field. Ward took his men from Vladivostok to Omsk, and effectively served as senior British officer in the region. He was instrumental in saving the lives of the Directorate of Five whom Kolchak replaced, but was on friendly terms with Kolchak throughout the period. His book about these events, With the Diehards in Siberia, was published in 1920, shortly after his return to England on 3 September 1919. He later became secretary of the Russian Relief and Reconstruction Fund, which helped those who had been victims of the Bolsheviks. He also became a vice-president of the British Legion and a trustee of Comrades of the Great War, another veterans' organisation founded in 1917.

Ward was appointed Companion of the Order of St Michael and St George (CMG) in 1918 and Companion of the Order of the Bath (CB) in 1919. He also received the French Croix de Guerre (for the Battle of Kraevsky) and the Italian and Czechoslovak equivalents, and was given the great honour of being made an ataman by his Cossack allies.

== Post-war ==
After the war Ward was returned to the House of Commons as a Coalition Liberal in 1918, unopposed in his absence. He became increasingly anti-socialist, having witnessed atrocities committed by the Bolsheviks in Russia. Ward was accused by General William S. Graves, the commander of U.S. forces in Siberia, of misrepresenting the facts surrounding the actions of U.S. forces. He was also opposed to pacifism. He was re-elected in 1922, with a large majority; and in 1923, with a much smaller majority. He objected to the individual membership permitted by the Labour Party's 1918 Constitution; previously one could only join Labour through membership of an affiliated trade union or socialist society, and Ward felt that individual membership would open up the party to middle-class eccentrics. In 1924 he was returned as a Constitutionalist, backed by the Liberals and Conservatives, although he re-took the Liberal Party whip after the election on 16 December 1924. In 1922 he was appointed to the Select Committee on War Service Canteens. He had developed an opposition to the mui tsai system, a form of Chinese child slavery then prevalent in Hong Kong, during his military service in the colony. His vocal criticism in the House of Commons eventually contributed to the abolition of mui tsai in colonial Hong Kong.

In 1929, Ward was defeated by Lady Cynthia Mosley, the Labour candidate, by a large margin, and decided to retire from politics. He retired to Weyhill, where he became a justice of the peace and president of the Andover branch of the British Legion. Having suffered heart problems for several years, he died at his home in 1934 and was buried in Appleshaw, where he had spent much of his childhood.

== Cultural depictions ==
In 2013, Ward appeared briefly as a character in the TV drama series Downton Abbey (episode 7 of series 4), giving a lecture in Ripon. He was played by actor Stephen Critchlow.

== Footnotes ==
Parliament of the United Kingdom
Preceded by Douglas Harry Coghill	Member of Parliament for Stoke-upon-Trent; 1906–1918	Constituency abolished
New constituency	Member of Parliament for Stoke; 1918–1929	Succeeded by Lady Cynthia Mosley
Trade union offices
New post	President of the Navvies, Bricklayers' Labourers and General Labourers' Union; 1890–1896	Succeeded by Richard Davies
Preceded by Arthur Humphrey	General Secretary of the Navvies, Bricklayers' Labourers and General Labourers' Union; 1897–1933	Union dissolved
