= Silentnight =

UK bed and mattress manufacturer

- Industry: Bed manufacturer
- Predecessor: Clarke's Mattresses
- Founded: 1946 in Skipton, North Yorkshire, England
- Founder: Tom Clarke
- Headquarters: Barnoldswick, England
- Key people: Tracey Bamber (CEO) Daniel Orwin (CFO)
- Revenue: £152.1 million (2016–2017)
- Net income: £14.6 million
- Website: www.silentnight.co.uk

Silentnight is a beds and mattresses manufacturer located in Barnoldswick, Lancashire, England. The company is owned by HIG Europe who acquired the company on 10 May 2011. The company also manufactures Rest Assured beds & mattresses and was originally founded in 1946.

== History ==
The brand is Silentnight, and the company name is Silentnight Group.

The company was founded on 11 July 1946 by Tom Clarke. It was founded as Clarke's Mattresses Limited in Skipton with the gratuity paid to Tom after he was demobbed from the Royal Navy. The name was changed to Silentnight Limited in 1951 at the suggestion of Tom's wife, Joan. Clarke later said that the name change was a brainwave that brought millions into the company.

Famous to the brand are the iconic Hippo and Duck characters, introduced in 1985 and shared in the brand’s TV advertising campaign in 1986. Hippo and Duck illustrate Silentnight’s innovative introduction of Miracoil® spring units, designed to offer zoned support with no partner disturbance. They also feature in the brand’s ellipse logo, serving purpose as recognisable mascots.

The company floated on the stock market in 1973 but due to market uncertainty and a loss of confidence with the management, the Clarke family took full possession of the company again in 2003 and the company became private.

During the 1980s, and again in the 2000s and the 2010s, the company was the United Kingdom's largest bed manufacturer.

The companies fortunes declined in private ownership and, in May 2011, the company was saved from receivership by HIG Europe, a private equity company. Much of the existing management was replaced in 2011, including the Clarke family.

HIG Europe spent £19 million acquiring the company, but in doing so, shelved some of the pension scheme rights for retired and current workers. The Pensions Regulator served notice in 2013 that they would start legal proceedings to reverse this process and force HIG to re-invest £17.2 million back into the company's pension pot. HIG eventually agreed a £25 million settlement with the regulator in 2021.

=== Strike action ===
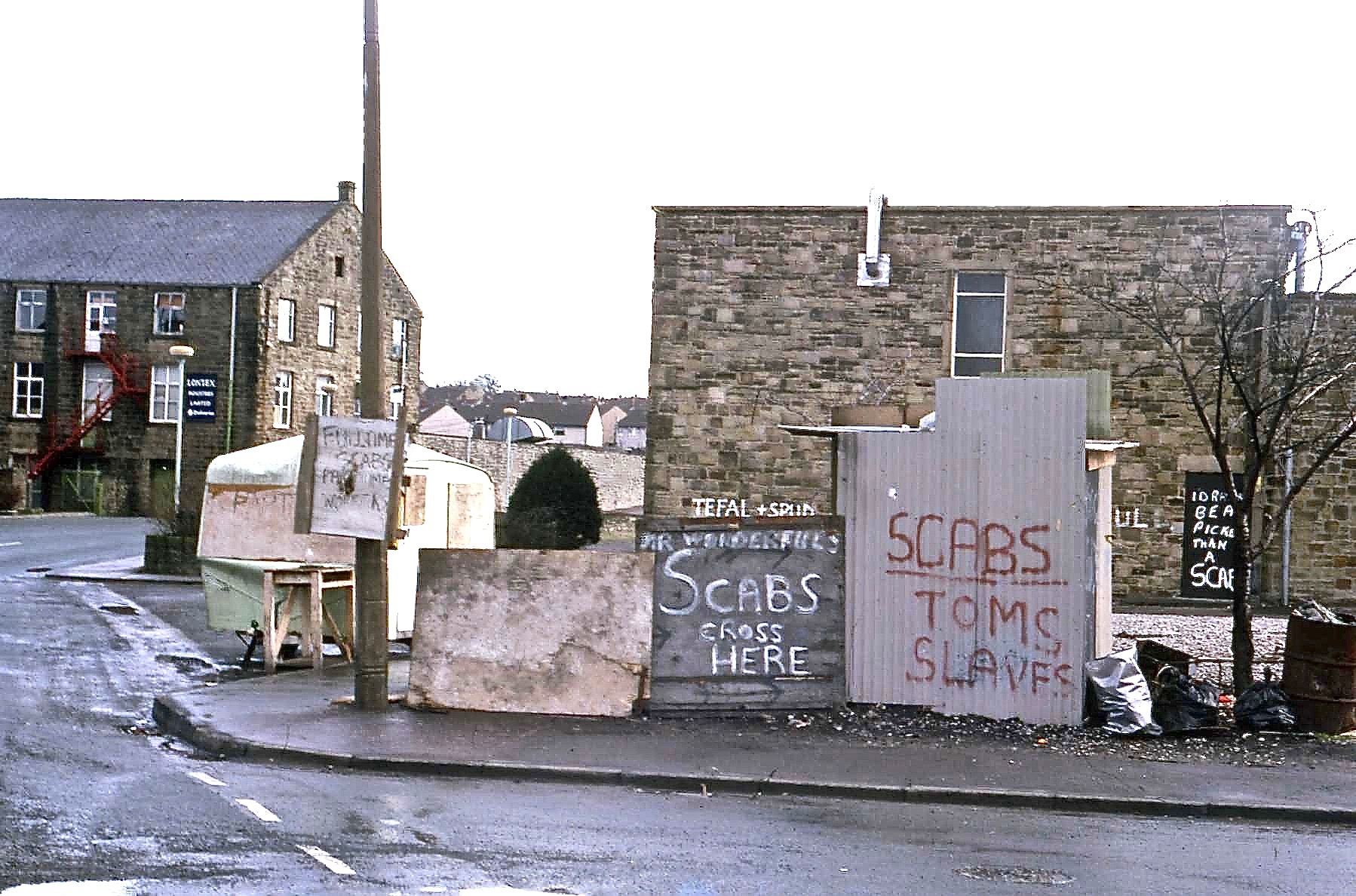
Barnoldswick industrial building during Silentnight strike – June 1986

For 18 months between 1985 and 1987, the company had a drawn out strike which is the longest strike action against one company in Britain, which took place over 616 days.

Workers belonging to the Furniture, Timber and Allied Trades Union went out on strike from two of the Silentnight factories at the time, Barnoldswick and Sutton-in-Craven due to an increased demand by management upon production scales. The union also claimed that an agreement had been reached whereby the workforce would not press for a pay rise provided the company did not enforce any redundancies. Eight weeks later, 52 members of staff were made redundant.

As a result of the strike, 346 workers were sacked by the company. The strike gained much support from the miners and the Labour Party. Whilst the strike was discussed at length in Parliament and it was noted for its generally passive nature, there were incidents of rock throwing and one notable event when the strikers' caravan was firebombed. The chief executive at the time was Tom Clarke, the company's founder, who was a supporter of the Conservative Party and friend of Margaret Thatcher, who gave him the nickname of Mr Wonderful. This led to the strikers erecting boards at the picket line which read "Mr Wonderful's scabs cross here".

== Structure ==
The company employs around 1,250 people in the United Kingdom. It is headquartered in Barnoldswick, Lancashire, in Pendle, where the company has been based since 1949, and in its current premises since 1961. The company also operates a digital office on Quay Street in Manchester.

Formerly, the company had factories in Sutton-in-Craven (1970–1994), Batley (closed March 2012) and Keighley, which was closed in March 2002. All of these, and the Barnoldswick plant, were in the former West Riding of Yorkshire when the company was started. The boundary change of 1974, put the Barnoldswick factory in Lancashire. The plant is a major employer in the area alongside the Rolls-Royce jet engine facility in the town.

The company also had other plants around the United Kingdom as a result of its acquisitions of rival companies. Two plants in South Wales and Andover, which were part of the Ducal brand, were closed when the company re organized and went private in 2003. Many jobs from the closed Keighley factory were transferred to Sunderland, but this plant was sold off as a management buyout under the Stag Furniture brand in June 2005.

During the period of ownership by HIG both turnover and profits have increased markedly, after the initial management clear-out and implementations of the turn round plan. Turnover grew by over 50% between 2012 & 2017 & a pre-tax loss of £4.5m was turned into a pre-tax profit of £11.6m in the same time period.

Pre-takeover

- 2008/09 turnover was £110.8m
- 2009/10 turnover was £107.1m

Post-takeover

- 2012/13 turnover was £98.9m with pre-tax loss of £4.5m
- 2013/14 turnover was £109.3m with pre-tax loss of £3.2m
- 2014/15 turnover was £125.1m with pre-tax profit of £3.3m
- 2015/16 turnover was £137.5m with pre-tax profits at £3.9m
- 2016/17 turnover was £152.1m with pre-tax profits of £11.6m

== Brands ==
- Layezee
- Perfecta
- Rest Assured
- Silentnight
- Studio
- The Pocket Spring Bed Company

== See also ==
- Adrian Fawcett
