= Alf Tomkins =

British trade union leader (1895–1975)

Sir Alfred George Tomkins (9 March 1895 – 6 May 1975) was a long-serving British trade union leader.

Tomkins worked as a chair-maker and joined the National Amalgamated Furnishing Trades Association (NAFTA), becoming a branch secretary in 1922. A member of the Communist Party of Great Britain (CPGB) and supporter of industrial unionism, he quickly became well known through promoting this position at the Trades Union Congress.

In 1923, Tomkins was elected as the union's chairman and, in 1927, he became its full-time London organiser. After serving as assistant general secretary, he was elected as general secretary in 1941. He arranged a merger that formed the National Union of Furniture Trade Operatives, and served as general secretary of the new union until 1971 when a further merger formed the Furniture, Timber and Allied Trades Union (FTAT). Over time, his politics moved to the right, and he became a firm opponent of the CPGB, although he continued to work closely with CPGB members in his union.

Despite being in his mid-seventies, Tomkins was elected as general secretary of FTAT, serving until his death in 1975. In his spare time, Tomkins served on the Industrial Court, the Council of Industrial Design, and the furniture manufacturing joint industry council. Shortly before his death, he was awarded a knighthood.

Trade union offices
Preceded by Alex Gossip	General Secretary of the National Amalgamated Furnishing Trades Association; 1941 – 1947	Succeeded by Position abolished
Preceded by New position	General Secretary of the National Union of Furniture Trade Operatives; 1947 – 1971	Succeeded by Position abolished
Preceded by New position	General Secretary of the Furniture, Timber and Allied Trades Union; 1971 – 1975	Succeeded by Robert Shube
Preceded by Jack Wigglesworth	President of the General Federation of Trade Unions; 1959 – 1961	Succeeded by Robert Driver
