= National Union of Funeral Service Operatives =

Former trade union of the United Kingdom

The National Union of Funeral Service Operatives was a trade union representing undertakers, crematorium workers, and workers in related businesses, such as florists, in the United Kingdom.

The union was founded in 1917 as the British Funeral Workers' Association. By 1946, it had 1,300 members, although almost all were in London, with the only other branches being in Brighton, Gravesend and Southampton. Early in the 1970s it was renamed the National Union of Funeral and Crematorium Workers, then soon took its final name, the "National Union of Funeral Service Operatives". Membership peaked at 1,400, but fell back to 1,000 by 1978, when it merged into the Furniture, Timber and Allied Trades Union.

== General Secretaries ==
1917: W. Newman
1946: E. Anderson
