= SS Tyndareus =

British steamship

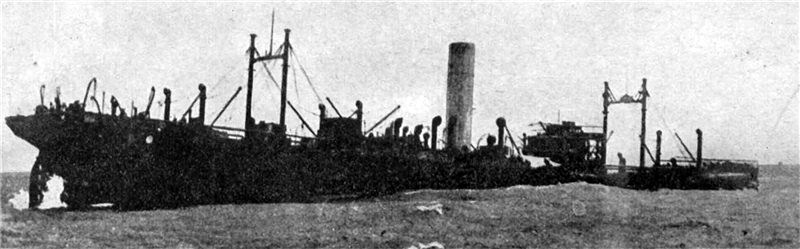

History

United Kingdom
- Name: Tyndareus
- Namesake: Tyndareus, legendary King of Sparta
- Owner: Ocean Steamship Company
- Port of registry: Liverpool
- Ordered: 3 March 1914
- Builder: Scotts Shipbuilding and Engineering Company Ltd., Greenock
- Laid down: 30 March 1914
- Launched: December 1915
- Completed: 21 November 1916
- Identification: United Kingdom official number: 137527; Code Letters JNPG
- Fate: Requisitioned by the Admiralty on completion

United Kingdom
- Name: Tyndareus
- Acquired: 21 November 1916
- Fate: Returned to owner, 1920
- Notes: 6 February 1917, struck a mine off Cape Agulhas and was recovered to Simonstown for repairs

United Kingdom
- Name: Tyndareus
- Owner: Ocean Steamship Company
- Route: Hong Kong/Yokohama/Tacoma, Washington
- Acquired: 1920
- Identification: United Kingdom official number: 137527; Code Letters JNPG until 1934; Code Letters GMKX from 1934
- Fate: Requisitioned by the Admiralty, 1940

United Kingdom
- Name: Tyndareus
- Acquired: 1940
- Fate: Returned to owner, 1946

United Kingdom
- Name: Tyndareus
- Owner: Ocean Steamship Company
- Route: Indonesia/Jeddah
- Acquired: 1946
- Fate: Broken up at Hong Kong, 9 September 1960
- Notes: used for the Hajj, the annual Islamic pilgrimage to Mecca.

General characteristics
- Type: Cargo liner
- Tonnage: 11,347 GRT,7,172 NRT
- Length: 507 ft 0 in (154.53 m) p/p
- Beam: 63 ft 2 in (19.25 m)
- Draught: 43.6 ft (13.3 m)
- Depth: 41 ft 0 in (12.50 m)
- Installed power: 2 × triple expansion steam engines
- Propulsion: Twin screws
- Speed: 14 knots (26 km/h) maximum
- Capacity: 540 passengers

SS Tyndareus was a British steamship that was built in 1914–15 as a cargo liner for the Blue Funnel Line of the Ocean Steamship Company. Completed during World War I, she served as a troop ship and was nearly sunk by a German naval mine, but without loss of life. Between the wars she operated commercially in the Pacific Ocean, before returning to military service in World War II. Her final civil role was to carry Islamic pilgrims from Indonesia to Mecca, before being scrapped in 1960.

== Description ==
The ship was 507 feet (154.53 m) long, with a beam of 63 feet 2 inches (19.25 m) and a depth of 41 feet (12.50 m). She was powered by two triple expansion steam engines, which had cylinders of 22 1/2in (56 cm), 38 inches (97 cm) and 66 inches (170 cm) diameter by 54 inches (140 cm) stroke. The engines drove twin screw propellers. They were rated at 622 nhp and were built by Scotts Shipbuilding and Engineering Company. She was assessed at 11,361 GRT, 7,172 NRT.

== Construction ==
The ship was ordered on 3 March 1914, intended for the Ocean Steamship Company's Trans-Pacific Service, and was built at the yard of Scotts Shipbuilding and Engineering Company Ltd at Greenock on the River Clyde in Scotland. On completion in November 1916, she was taken-up as a troopship by the Admiralty under the Liner Requisition Scheme. The United Kingdom official number 137527 and code letters JPNG were allocated. Her port of registry was Liverpool.

== First World War ==
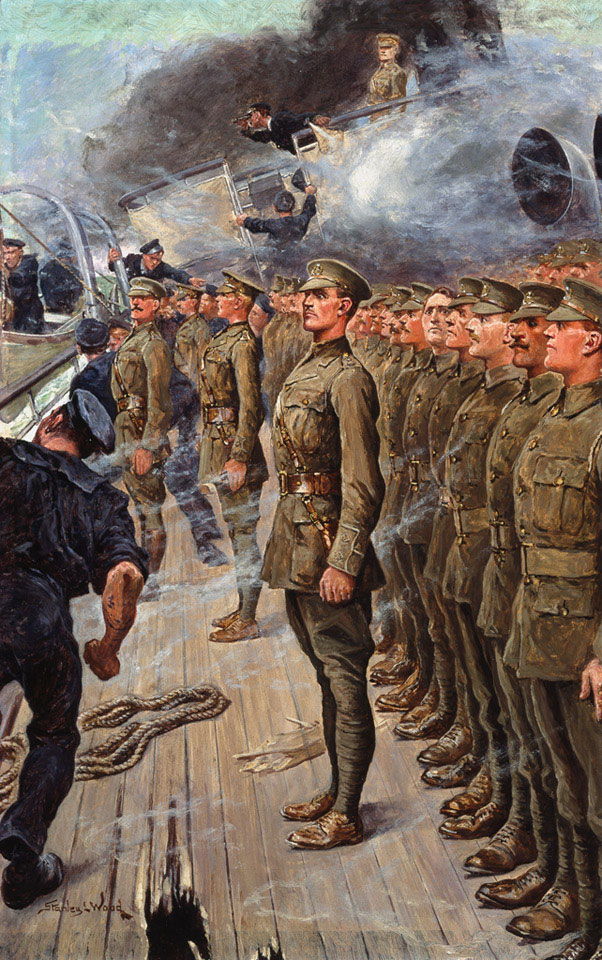
Troops parade while awaiting evacuation from Tyndareus, an oil painting by Stanley Llewellyn Wood (1866–1928).

Her maiden voyage in January 1917 was from her home port of Liverpool to the Far East, under Captain George Flynn. On 6 February 1917, Tyndareus struck a mine which had been laid by the merchant raider, SMS Wolf, while about 10 miles (16 km) off Cape Agulhas, the geographic southern tip of the African continent. The explosion tore a large hole in the forward part of her hull and she began to sink by the head. On board were 30 officers and 1,000 men of the 25th (Garrison Service) Battalion, The Middlesex Regiment, who were bound for Hong Kong, commanded by Lieutenant-Colonel John Ward, who was the Liberal–Labour Member of Parliament for Stoke-upon-Trent. The troops were paraded on deck in their life jackets while a roll call was taken. According to an account published in the Cape Times, the soldiers then began to sing "There's a Long Long Trail A-Winding" and "It's a Long Way to Tipperary" while waiting for further orders, which the journalist described as a "fine story of British pluck, recalling that of the Birkenhead". Despite rough seas, all the troops were successfully transferred to another Blue Funnel ship, SS Eumaeus, and the hospital ship, HMHS Oxfordshire, which had responded to Tyndareus's SOS signals. A British cruiser, HMS Hyacinth, arrived from Simonstown accompanied by a tug to assist the stricken troopship. The captain of Hyacinth ordered that Tyndareus be beached, as it was a hazard to shipping, but Captain Flynn ignored the order and by skillful seamanship and damage control, was able to take the sinking ship safely into Simonstown, where she could be repaired. The Governor General of South Africa, Viscount Buxton, wrote to the chairman of the Blue Funnel Line, congratulating the company and the ship's builders on the design features of the hull which enabled the ship to be saved, which he presumed were "consequent upon the loss of the Titanic".

King George V sent a message to the troops which read:

Please express to the officers commanding the Battalion of the Middlesex Regiment my admiration of the conduct displayed by all ranks on the occasion of the accident to Tyndareus. In their discipline and courage they worthily upheld the splendid tradition of Birkenhead, ever cherished in the annals of the British Army.

An oil painting of the soldiers parading on deck was made by Stanley Llewellyn Wood. A memorial stone was commissioned by Lieutenant Colonel Ward recording the gallantry of his men, and was erected on Victoria Peak on Hong Kong Island; it was brought to London in 1994 and is now at the National Army Museum in Chelsea.

== Interwar period ==
Returned to the Blue Funnel Line in 1920, Tyndareus finally began her intended "Trans-Pacific Service" which ran from Hong Kong to Tacoma, Washington, via Japan, Vancouver and Seattle. She was briefly taken-up as a troopship in 1927 to take British reinforcements to Shanghai during the "China Affair". In 1934, her Code Letters were changed to GMKX.

== Second World War ==
In 1940, Tyndareus was requisitioned again to carry troops and military stores. In October 1940, she was one of 32 Allied merchant and transport ships that formed Convoy BN 7, which was on passage from Bombay to Suez via Aden with a heavy naval escort. On 20 October, the convoy was attacked by four Italian destroyers off Massawa in the Red Sea. One Italian destroyer was sunk without loss to the transports, although a British destroyer was disabled and towed to safety. The last wartime convoy for Tyndareus was MKS.99G from Gibraltar to Liverpool, arriving on 12 May 1945.

== Postwar ==
In 1949, Tyndareus was refitted at a cost of £126,650 to take Muslims on the Hajj, the annual pilgrimage to Mecca, with accommodation for 2,500 pilgrims. First sailing from Indonesia to Jeddah in 1950, she continued without a serious breakdown until a replacement was acquired in 1960. She finally arrived at Hong Kong on 9 September 1960, where she was broken up.
