= Arthur Henry Telling =

British trade unionist

Arthur Henry Telling OBE (born 28 March 1884) was a British trade unionist.

== Biography ==
=== Early life and career ===
Born in Gloucester, Telling became a plasterer. He joined the National Association of Operative Plasterers (NAOP), and began working full-time for the union in Newport, Wales. During World War I, he served with the Royal Army Medical Corps, and was awarded the Military Medal.

=== As the NAOP general secretary ===
In 1920, Telling was appointed as Assistant General Secretary of the NAOP, working under T. H. Otley. Otley died suddenly in 1922, and Telling was appointed as acting general secretary of the union, winning an election to the permanent post in September.

Telling immediately began reforming the union, ensuring that regional representatives could take seats on the executive, and appointing accountants to audit the union’s accounts, rather than electing members to fill the role. Later, he appointed full-time organisers for every region. Despite many disputes and the depression, membership of the union generally increased under Telling's leadership.

In 1936, Telling visited the Soviet Union, but reported back that British building methods were superior. On 29 March 1941, he suffered a serious accident while travelling in a motorcycle sidecar, and took several months' sick leave. While he was off, the union's office was destroyed by bombing during the Blitz.

Union membership and finances struggled during the war, but rebounded afterwards, reaching more 19,967 in 1947. Membership then began declining, and in March 1949, Telling reached 65, the set age for retirement from union offices. The process to elect a replacement left him in office for a further year, but an operation near the end of 1949 led him to take several weeks off work. He finally stood down in March 1950.

=== Recognition ===
Telling was highly regarded by the union, and was awarded a testimonial cheque for £250. In retirement, he received a pension from the union, but this increased in line with inflation, rather than wage increases in the industry. Telling objected to this and took the union to court, winning the case.

Telling was made an Officer of the Order of the British Empire in the 1950 New Year Honours. He was active in the Labour Party and served as an alderman.

Trade union offices
| Preceded by Post vacant | Assistant General Secretary of the National Association of Operative Plasterers; 1920–1922 | Succeeded by Henry Cockerill |
| Preceded by Thomas Otley | General Secretary of the National Association of Operative Plasterers; 1922–1950 | Succeeded by Albert Dunne |
