= Public Works and Constructional Operatives' Union =

Former trade union of the United Kingdom

- Merged into: Transport and General Workers' Union
- Founded: 1889
- Dissolved: 1933
- Headquarters: East Hill, Wandsworth
- Location: United Kingdom
- Key people: John Ward (General Secretary)

The Public Works and Constructional Operatives' Union was a trade union representing labourers in the United Kingdom.

== History ==
The union was founded in 1889 by Andrew Hall and Arthur Humphrey in West Ham, late in 1889, Navvies, Bricklayers' Labourers and General Labourers' Union. John Ward had been attempting to found a similar organisation in Battersea, and in May 1890 he was persuaded to join the new union, winning election in June as its first president. The union grew rapidly, and by 1892 claimed 5,000 members. The union gradually spread across England and South Wales, developing particular strength in the port at Barry.

In 1897, Ward and Humphrey both resigned, in protest at the union's London-based executive refusing to increase their travel allowances. Ward was appointed as leader of a new South Wales and South Western district, and led a successful strike in Barry. He was elected as the union's general secretary, and moved the headquarters to Barry, although he returned them to London two years later.

While Ward remained leader of the union, he was away throughout World War I, leading a labour battalion, and he then led it as an anti-Soviet force in the Russian Civil War. The lack of leadership led much of the union's membership to defect to its main rivals, National Association of Builders' Labourers, the United Order of General Labourers of Great Britain and Ireland, and the United Builders' Labourers Union.

In 1920, the National Federation of Building Trade Operatives arranged a merger conference between the four unions of labourers, but Ward returned and withdrew the union from them. He renamed the union as the Public Workers and Constructional Operatives' Union, but it never became a significant force again. In 1929, its Staffordshire district merged into the Transport and General Workers' Union, and the last remnant of the union, still led by Ward, disappeared in 1933.

== Leadership ==
=== General Secretaries ===
1889: Arthur Humphrey
1896: W. Martin
1897: John Ward

=== Presidents ===
1890: John Ward
1897: Richard Davies
1899:
