= Scottish National Operative Plasterers' Union =

Scottish Plasterers' Union
- Scottish National Operative Plasterers' Union
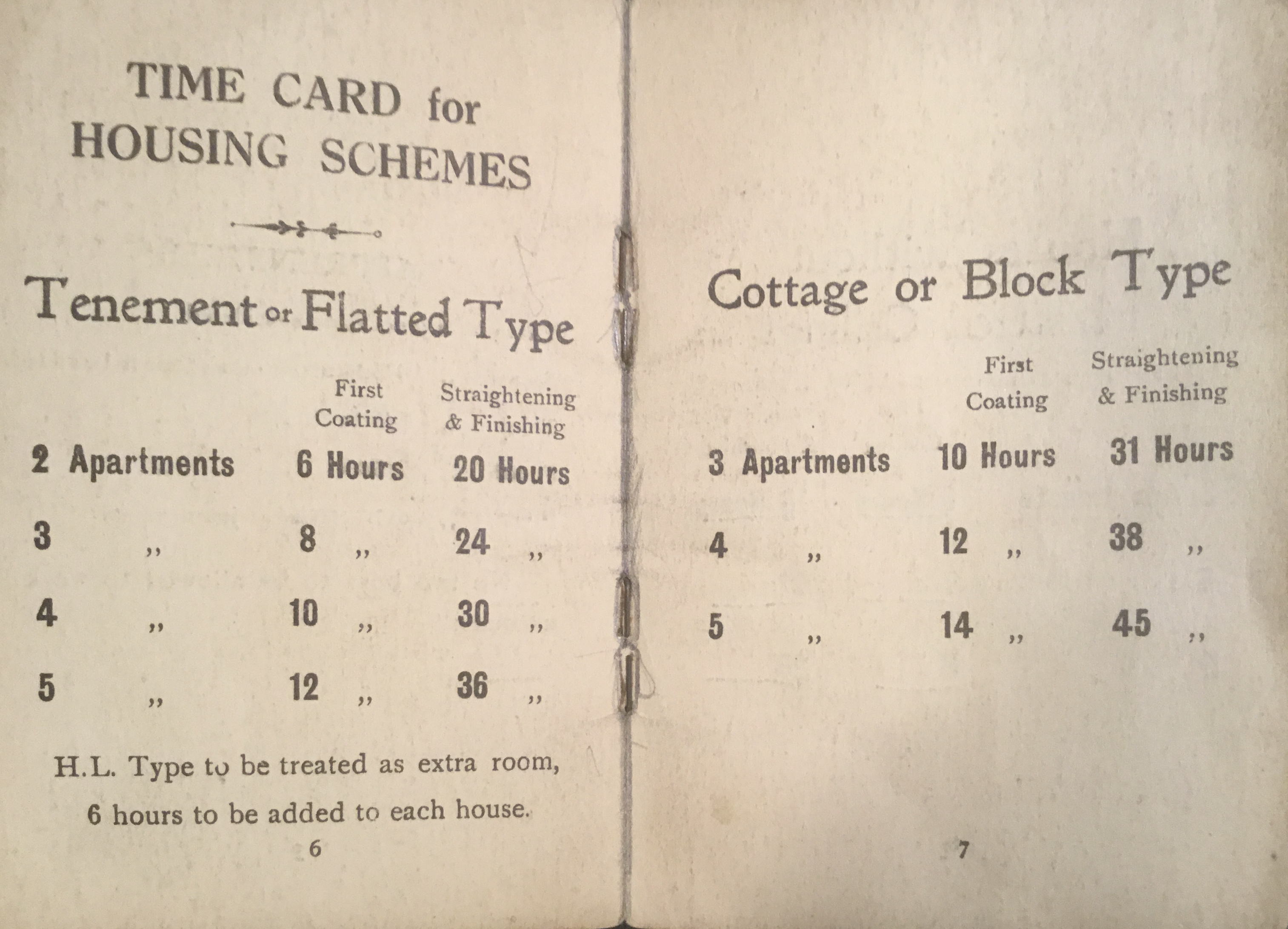
- 1936 Rate Card
- Merged into: National Association of Operative Plasterers
- Founded: 1888
- Dissolved: 1 September 1966
- Headquarters: 18 Royal Crescent, Glasgow
- Location: Scotland
- Members: 1,621 (1901)
- Affiliations: NFBTO, STUC

The Scottish National Operative Plasterers' Union was a trade union representing plasterers in Scotland.

The union was founded in 1888 by local plasterers' unions in Aberdeen, Dundee, Edinburgh and Glasgow, with many others across the country soon joining. Initially named the Scottish National Operative Plasterers' Federal Union, for many years it had little central structure, with local branches retaining half of all membership fees. It was noted for adopting an initiation rite in 1892, at a time when other unions had abandoned the idea. By 1891, the union had 943 members, and this had risen to 1,211 in 1894, representing about 80% of all the plasterers in the country, and membership peaked at 1,621 in 1901.

The union joined the National Federation of Building Trade Operatives in 1918, and although it left in 1922, it rejoined in 1933.

In 1939, it was renamed as the Scottish National Operative Plasterers' Protective and Benefit Federal Union, and then in 1945 as the Scottish National Operative Plasterers' Union. Finally, in 1959, it became the Scottish Plasterers' Union.

In 1967, the union merged into the English-based National Association of Operative Plasterers.

== General Secretaries ==
c. 1889: Henry Guthrie
1894: A. Dudgeon
1906: Daniel Baird
1937:
as of 1960: T. Patrick
