= Amalgamated Union of Upholsterers =

Former trade union of the United Kingdom

- Abbreviation: AUU
- Merged into: National Amalgamated Furnishing Trades Association
- Successor: National Union of Furniture Trade Operatives
- Formation: Liverpool, 1891
- Founded at: Liverpool, England
- Dissolved: 1947
- Type: Trade union
- Region served: United Kingdom and Ireland
- Members: 900 (1946)
- Affiliations: Labour Representation Committee; Trades Union Congress; Federation of Engineering and Shipbuilding Trades

The Amalgamated Union of Upholsterers (AUU) was a trade union representing upholstery workers in the United Kingdom.

The union was founded in Liverpool in 1891, with the merger of local trade unions based in Belfast, Dublin, Edinburgh, Glasgow, Manchester and Liverpool itself. There were also upholstery unions in London, but they did not affiliate. Initially, the union operated as a federation, with each branch deciding its own policy on welfare benefits for sick or unemployed members. The union was certainly well established by 17 September 1892, when an illuminated scroll was presented to the President, Mr W D Lyons by the members of the "Society". This was in thanks for "the able manner in which you have discharged your duties as President during the past year." There follow twenty names of Union members, Vice President, Secretary, Treasurer, etc. This scroll is now in possession of a descendant of Mr Lyons.

Membership grew steadily, from 480 on formation to 681 in 1892, with four new branches formed including one in London, and by 1901 it was able to employ Lewis Leckie as its first full-time general secretary. Under his leadership, the union joined the Labour Representation Committee. He also tried to arrange a merger between it, the National Amalgamated Furnishing Trades Association (NAFTA), the Amalgamated Union of Cabinetmakers and the Amalgamated Society of French Polishers, but discussions in both 1909 and 1913 failed as agreement could not be reached on levels of membership fees and benefits.

The union became involved in demarcation disputes, but these were resolved by 1915, when it was permitted to rejoin the Trades Union Congress and affiliate to the Federation of Engineering and Shipbuilding Trades. From 1918, it ceased to act as a craft union by admitting all workers in the trade, regardless of their perceived level of skill. It also began admitting women for the first time.

By 1946, the union had only 900 members. The following year, it finally agreed a merger with NAFTA, which formed the National Union of Furniture Trade Operatives.

== General Secretaries ==
1891: W. Watson
1897: Lewis Leckie
1923: E. W. Wilsdon
1936: Jock Shanley
