= United Builders' Labourers Union =

Former trade union of the United Kingdom

The United Builders' Labourers Union was a trade union representing labourers in the construction industry in the United Kingdom.

The union was founded in London in 1889, and began recruiting members nationally from 1892. As a result, it grew rapidly, to 4,650 members in 1896, and around 10,000 in 1900. It was an early member of the Labour Representation Committee, and also joined the Trades Union Congress.

In 1902, the union took part in a merger conference with the Navvies, Bricklayers' Labourers and General Labourers Union, the Hull and District Builders' Labourers Union, the National Amalgamated Union of Labour, the London Amalgamated Plumbers' Mates Society, the United Order of General Labourers of London and the National Union of Gas Workers and General Labourers. The meetings lasted several months, but no agreement was reached, and a legacy of distrust between the unions resulted.

In 1920, the United Builders' Labourers applied to join the National Federation of Building Trade Operatives. As a condition of membership, the federation insisted it attend a merger conference with its main rivals, by now the National Association of Builders' Labourers, the United Order of General Labourers of Great Britain and Ireland, and the Navvies', Bricklayers' Labourers' and General Labourers' Union. This was not successful; the Navvies and the United Order had little interest in amalgamation, while the National and the United Builders could not agree on a way forward. Instead, the United Builders reconstituted itself as the National Builders' Labourers and Constructional Workers' Society (NBLCWS). This survived until 1952, when it merged into the Amalgamated Union of Building Trade Workers.

== General Secretaries ==
1889: W. Stevenson
1905: Dennis Haggerty
1928: George Elmer
1949: Ted Lamerton
