= Building and Monumental Workers' Association of Scotland =

Former trade union of the United Kingdom

- Predecessor: United Operative Masons' Association of Scotland; United Operative Masons' and Granite Cutters' Union
- Merged into: Amalgamated Union of Building Trade Workers
- Founded: 1919
- Dissolved: 1942
- Headquarters: 65 West Regent Street, Glasgow
- Location: Scotland
- Members: 5,000 (1942)
- Publication: Building and Monumental Workers' Trade Journal

The Building and Monumental Workers' Association of Scotland was a trade union representing stonemasons in Scotland. While never a large union, it brought together all the unionised stonemasons in the country.

The union was founded in 1919, when the United Operative Masons' Association of Scotland merged with the United Operative Masons' and Granite Cutters' Union, the Associated Paviors' Federal Union, and the Scottish Amalgamated Society of Mosaic and Encaustic Tile Fixers, Marble Workers and Fireplace Builders.

Membership of the union was 5,000 in 1924, and it was still 5,000 in 1942. However, it had built up a healthy reserve fund of £18,000. That year, it decided to merge into the Amalgamated Union of Building Trade Workers, which already represented stonemasons in England and Wales.

== General Secretaries ==
1919: Hugh McPherson
1937: David Black
