= Alfred Gould (trade unionist) =

British trade unionist and politician (1856–1927)

Alfred Gould (23 May 1856 – 30 May 1927) was a British trade unionist and politician.

Born in Kingston-upon-Hull, Gould became a carpenter, initially working aboard a ship but, by 1881, onshore in Hull. He joined the Amalgamated Society of Carpenters and Joiners (ASC&J), and developed a keen interest in the labour movement. Convinced that there was a need for independent political representation for the movement, he was a founder member of the Independent Labour Party (ILP), and was a leading supporter of Tom McCarthy's unsuccessful campaign in Kingston upon Hull West at the 1895 United Kingdom general election.

Hull Trades Council opposed the ILP and undertook little activity in the late 1890s, but Gould consistently raised the party's causes there, and in 1897 he won election to the council's executive committee. By 1905, he was the leading figure on the council, which was dominated by supporters of the new Labour Representation Committee. He won election to Hull City Council, and though he lost his seat in 1911, he regained it two years later, and was adopted as the party's Prospective Parliamentary Candidate for Hull West.

During 1913, Gould was a leading opponent of the deportation of nine South African trade unionists to Britain, but the following year, he joined Havelock Wilson's campaign to exclude non-white sailors from British ships. He supported World War I, and spoke against conscientious objectors, and stood down from his Hull West candidacy on the outbreak of war.

Gould continued his trade union activity, winning election to the executive of the ASC&J, and from 1917 as the first chair of its National Executive Committee. In 1918, he was also appointed as the first chair of the National Federation of Building Trades Operatives, serving for two years.

At the 1918 United Kingdom general election Gould stood for the Labour Party in the new seat of Kingston upon Hull South West, taking 19.3% of the vote and third place. This disappointment led him to focus on the trade union movement, and when the ASC&J merged into the new Amalgamated Society of Woodworkers, he was one of its most prominent figures. However, the new union adopted a rule requiring members of the executive to retire at the age of 63. Already over this limit, Gould retired in 1925 and began suffering from poor health. In May 1927, he committed suicide by hanging himself in his home.

Trade union offices
Preceded by New position	Chair of the National Federation of Building Trade Operatives; 1918–1920	Succeeded by Richard Coppock
