= John M. Davenport =

Church of England clergyman and writer

John Metcalf Davenport (1842–1913) was a Church of England clergyman and writer. He began his career as a clerk for his father, a prominent commercial chemist. Following an awakening, he went to Exeter College, Oxford from which he graduated in 1871, the year he became a deacon. Davenport was ordained a priest in 1872, and ten years later travelled to Canada, where personal wealth allowed him to bring choristers from England, and open the Davenport School for moulding boys into “cultured Christian gentlemen.” He returned to England in 1909 where he served until 1912 as vicar of St. Clement's, Bournemouth.

John M. Davenport’s publications include A clerical firebrand ([Saint John, 1894]; Messiah (God incarnate) not Messiah’s mother the “bruiser of the serpents head” . . . with a concise exposure of Mr. R. F. Quigley’s errors and controversial tactics . . . (Saint John, 1891); and Papal infallibility: “Catholic’s” replies to “Cleophas”, refuting the Vatican dogma . . . (Saint John, 1885).
