= Park Holidays UK =

Operatator of holiday parks

Park Holidays UK Limited
- Type: Private Limited Company
- Industry: Leisure / Holiday
- Predecessor: Cinque Ports Leisure Ltd (to January 2007)
- Founded: 1984 (original co.)
- Headquarters: Bexhill-on-Sea, East Sussex
- Number of locations: 56 caravan holiday parks in the UK
- Key people: Jeffrey Sills
- Services: Operation of holiday home parks
- Revenue: ▲£154.8m (2018)
- Operating income: ▲£38.5m (2018)
- Net income: ▲£21.9m (2018)
- Number of employees: Park Holidays UK employs up to 2,900 in the summer months
- Parent: Aermont
- Website: www.parkholidays.com

Park Holidays UK operates 56 holiday parks in the UK and is one of the largest holiday park operators in the UK, offering caravan and lodge holidays, glamping breaks, touring and camping, and holiday home ownership. It has parks in both country and coastal locations.

== History ==
The company was founded in the mid-1980s and was originally called Cinque Ports Leisure. Frenchmans Beach, renamed Rye Harbour, was the first park to be owned, and as the company expanded to include other Kent and East Sussex parks, the name Cinque Ports Leisure was introduced to emphasize the regional base; Cinque Ports being associated with the port towns that helped defend the UK during the Napoleonic wars.

The company significantly expanded in 2001 with the purchase of ten parks from Haven Holidays, which extended the company's presence west into Dorset and Hampshire and north into Essex and Suffolk.

In 2006, the business was acquired by Graphite Capital, and changed its name to Park Holidays UK in 2007, to reflect its expansion away from the Kent and East Sussex area, and the growing holiday and short break aspect of the business.

In November 2013, Caledonia Investments became the owners which facilitated continued investment and further acquisitions.

In December 2015, Park Holidays UK relocated its head office from Coghurst Hall, Hastings, to Glovers House, Bexhill-on-Sea with approximately 90 staff members, the first development to be completed in the newly built Bexhill Enterprise Park. Keeping with the company's growing ambition Glovers House is a modern, low-energy building with panoramic views over the surrounding Sussex countryside, housing a three-floor, 25,235-square-foot set of offices. In December 2016 it was announced that Caledonia Investments had agreed on terms for a sale to Tiger Bidco Ltd, a company incorporated by Intermediate Capital Group (ICG).

In April 2022 an agreement was reached with Sun Communities to acquire Park Holidays UK from ICG (intermediate Capital Group). Sun Communities is a publicly listed organisation and the largest operator of leisure and manufactured home communities in the USA.

Over the last 5–15 years Park Holidays UK have carried out major refurbishments to its holiday parks, in particular, focusing on infrastructure, clubhouses, new swimming pools, additional facilities, and upgraded holiday accommodation, with a strong focus on developments for luxury lodges.

On 23 June 2022 Sun Communities Inc acquired Park Leisure 2000 Ltd and announced that the latter would trade alongside Park Holidays UK as a sister company, and would be defined by a more boutique holiday park feel. The purchase includes the takeover of 11 holiday parks owned by Park Leisure across destinations in England, Scotland and North Wales.

On 11 April 2026, Park Holidays UK acquired its 56th park, Kingfisher Holiday Park In Yorkshire.

On 22 September 2026 Aermont Capital completed the acquisition on Park Holidays UK, for a net cash consideration of approximately $1.03 billion.

== Awards ==
Awards won by Park Holidays UK
Award	Awarding body	2024	2025	2026
Best Company for UK Parks & Lodges Holidays	British Travel Awards	Gold	Gold	-
Best Company for UK Short Breaks	British Travel Awards	Gold	Gold	-
Best Company for UK Family Holidays	British Travel Awards	Silver	Gold	-
Best Company for UK Holiday Home Rentals	British Travel Awards	-	Gold	-
Travellers Choice Awards (19 parks)	Tripadvisor	19	24	24
10 years of proven Trusted Services	Feefo	Awarded	-	-
We invest in people Gold award	Investors in People	-	Gold	-
Service award	Feefo	Gold	Gold	

== Locations ==
Park Holidays UK operates 39 parks: 1 park in Cumbria (Glendale); 5 parks in Cornwall (Bodmin, Hedley Wood, Hengar Manor, Trevella and Polperro); 4 parks in Devon (Dawlish Sands, Golden Sands, Tarka and Stowford Farm Meadows); 1 in Hampshire (Solent Breezes), 5 in Sussex (Beauport, Coghurst Hall, Chichester Lakeside, Winchelsea Sands, Pevensey Bay), 6 in Kent (Marlie, New Beach, Alberta, Seaview, Harts, Birchington Vale); 5 in Essex (Steeple Bay, Oaklands, Seawick, St Osyth Beach, Dovercourt); 5 in Suffolk (Felixstowe Beach, Suffolk Sands, Broadland Sands, Carlton Meres and Pakefield); 1 in Derbyshire (Newhaven); 3 in Yorkshire (Bowland Fell, Kingfisher and Sand Le Mere); and 3 in Scotland (Silver Sands, Burghead and Lossiemouth).

Park Leisure operates 16 parks: 3 parks in Cornwall (Oyster Bay, Par Sands and Pentire), 1 park in Devon (Waterside), 1 park in Dorset (Wood Farm), 1 park in Herefordshire (Malvern View), 1 park in Derbyshire (Ashbourne Heights) 1 park in Lancashire (Ribble Valley), 2 parks in North Wales (Brynteg and Plas Coch), 1 park in Northumberland (Amble Links), 1 park in Sussex (Rye Harbour), 1 park in Essex (West Mersea) and 3 parks in Yorkshire (Chantry and Yorkshire Dales)
