= National Federation of Building Trades Operatives =

Trade union federation in the UK

The National Federation of Building Trades Operatives (NFBTO) was a trade union federation in the United Kingdom, consisting of unions with members in construction and related industries.

== History ==
In 1914, a group of workers attempted to form the Building Workers' Trade Union, a single industrial union to cover the entire construction industry. The existing unions in the industry opposed this, and held a conference in London in February 1915, to discuss their response. They decided to set up the National Associated Building Trades Council (NABTC). This focused on considering what industrial policies would be desirable after World War I was concluded.

The council's members remained autonomous in all matters and were free to leave at will, but it attracted affiliations from most relevant unions:

- Amalgamated Slaters', Tilers' and Roofing Operatives' Society
- Amalgamated Society of Carpenters and Joiners
- Manchester Unity of Operative Bricklayers' Society
- National Association of Builders' Labourers
- National Amalgamated Society of Operative House and Ship Painters and Decorators
- United Builders' Labourers' Union
- United Operative Plumbers and Domestic Engineers Association of Great Britain and Ireland

The council achieved little, and the Carpenters proposed that a more centralised federation be created. This was agreed by the member unions, and on 5 February 1918, the council was refounded as the NFBTO. It was governed by a general council, chaired by Alfred Gould, and a secretary, Bill Bradshaw. It launched a campaign for a shorter working week, which was successful. In 1924, its members were locked out, the NFBTO coming to a settlement with employers. The Amalgamated Society of Woodcutting Machinists and National Association of Operative Plasterers resigned from the federation in protest, but both rejoined a few years later.

The federation recognised that in rural areas, most small towns and villages had some building workers, but there were not enough in any particular trade to form a branch of one of the affiliated unions. It decided to create a Composite Section, to represent these workers directly. It divided these members into two classes: class A, whose work was not closely aligned with any particular union, and came under the discipline of the federation, and class B, who were aligned with a particular union, were given membership of it, but the federation handled their contributions and the administration of their membership.

The federation remained prominent under two long-term secretaries: Richard Coppock from 1920 to 1961, then Harry Weaver, their long tenures partly as a result of not having to seek re-election. In 1934, Coppock and the NFBTO were central to forming the International Federation of Building and Wood Workers. In its later years, the federation also organised summer schools, and published the Builders' Standard tabloid.

The NFBTO was regarded as slow to act and bureaucratic. General Council members, on hearing of an issue, would report to their union executives and wait to be told how to vote, before returning and making decisions at the following meeting. In an attempt to tackle this, in 1964 it was renamed the central council, and all executive members of affiliates could attend, in the hope of enabling immediate policy decisions. Given its unwieldy nature, the council only met four times a year, and an executive committee of seven members made decisions between meetings. The federation also set up regional councils, each with its own secretary, and in any location where more than one affiliate had a branch, they could choose to also form a branch of the federation.

In 1970, the NFBTO changed its name to the National Federation of Construction Unions, but the following year, several affiliates merged to form the Union of Construction, Allied Trades and Technicians, and the federation decided to dissolve.

== Affiliates ==
The affiliates of the federation in 1965 were:

Union	Affiliated Membership	Notes
Amalgamated Slaters', Tilers' and Roofing Operatives' Society	2,012	Whole union
Amalgamated Society of Painters and Decorators	60,011	Relevant sections of union
Amalgamated Society of Woodcutting Machinists	8,000	Relevant sections of union
Amalgamated Society of Woodworkers	121,856	Relevant sections of union
Amalgamated Union of Asphalt Workers	2,000	Relevant sections of union
Amalgamated Union of Building Trade Workers	80,100	Whole union
Association of Building Technicians	900	Relevant sections of union
Constructional Engineering Union	4,000	Relevant sections of union
Electrical Trades Union	5,000	Relevant sections of union
National Association of Operative Plasterers	10,781	Whole union
National Society of Street Masons, Paviors and Road Makers	1,200	Relevant sections of union
National Union of Enginemen, Firemen, Mechanics and Electrical Workers	1,500	Relevant sections of union
National Union of Furniture Trade Operatives	6,000	Relevant sections of union
National Union of General and Municipal Workers	15,000	Relevant sections of union
Plumbing Trades Union	30,000	Relevant sections of union
Scottish Plasterers' Union	3,000	Whole union
Scottish Slaters', Tilers', Roofers' and Cement Workers' Society	2,050	Whole union
Transport and General Workers' Union	56,000	Relevant sections of union
United French Polishers' Society	1,000	Relevant sections of union
Composite Section	7,500	Integral part of federation
