= Amalgamated Society of Woodcutting Machinists =

Former trade union of the United Kingdom

- Abbreviation: ASWM
- Nickname: Mill Sawyers' Union
- Successor: Furniture, Timber and Allied Trades Union (FTAT)
- Formation: 1866
- Founded at: Birmingham, England
- Dissolved: 1971
- Merger of: National Union of Furniture Trade Operatives
- Type: Trade union
- Region served: Great Britain and Ireland
- Members: 23,000 (1970s)
- Formerly called: Birmingham and District Mill Sawyers and Planing Machine Workers' Trade Society

The Amalgamated Society of Woodcutting Machinists (ASWM) was a trade union representing sawyers in the United Kingdom.

The union was founded in 1866 as the Birmingham and District Mill Sawyers and Planing Machine Workers' Trade Society by a group of eighty workers. From 1877, it aimed to recruit members across the country, changing its name to the "Amalgamated Society of Woodcutting Machinists", although it was often called the Mill Sawyers' Union.

Membership gradually grew, to 248 in 1875, and 692 in 1890, and several regional unions merged into it: the London Mill Sawyers and Wood Cutting Machinists' Society, the Scottish Woodcutting Machinemen's Society, and the Yorkshire United Steam Sawyers and Woodcutting Machinists' Society. Early in the 1910s, it changed its name to the Amalgamated Society of Mill Sawyers and Woodcutting Machinists, then to the Amalgamated Society of Wood Cutting Machinists of Great Britain and Ireland, before returning to the ASWM name in 1919.

The union generally grew through the 20th-century, having 23,000 members by the 1970s. In 1971, it merged with the National Union of Furniture Trade Operatives to form the Furniture, Timber and Allied Trades Union.

== General Secretaries ==
1866: Joseph Wild
1877: Lees
Joseph Sewell
Thomas Park
1900s: Walter James Wentworth
1931: John MacKay
1934: James Lyno
1946: Jim Whittaker
1947: Thomas McAndrew
1960: Charles Stewart
