= John Davenport (trade unionist) =

British trade unionist

John Davenport (died 6 January 1941) was a British trade unionist.

Davenport came to prominence as an activist in the United Order of General Labourers (UOGL), working alongside Bob Merry. He was identified by Ben Tillett as one of the most able officials in the various unions of general workers. In 1913, he became the general secretary of the UOGL, also representing it at the Trades Union Congress (TUC). He was elected to the General Council of the TUC in 1921 but, the following year he took the UOGL into the new Transport and General Workers' Union (TGWU), and thereby became ineligible to defend his seat on the general council.

In 1924, Davenport was re-elected to the General Council of the TUC, this time as a representative of the TGWU. He served until his retirement in 1934, at which time he was described by President of the TUC Andrew Conley as "...one of those quiet steady workers with rather a retiring disposition".

Trade union offices
Preceded by Bob Merry	General Secretary of the United Order of General Labourers; 1913–1921	Succeeded by Position abolished
