= Amalgamated Union of Cabinetmakers =

UK trade union

The Amalgamated Union of Cabinet Makers (AUCM) was a trade union representing workers in furniture manufacturing in the United Kingdom.

The union was founded in 1833 as the Societies in the House Furnishing Department. It underwent numerous name changes, but in its early years was usually referred to as the Friendly Society of Operative Cabinet Makers.

In its early years, the union was a loose association of local trade unions from across Britain and Ireland. In 1837, with membership up to 1,020, it adopted a more centralised structure under the name Cabinet Makers' Society, and its Irish members left. In the 1840s, it became the Journeyman Cabinet Makers', Carvers' and Wood Turners' Friendly Society. Its based became the north west of England, particularly around Manchester and Liverpool, and it struggled to form sustainable branches elsewhere, membership falling to just 657 in 1846.

The union survived and started to grow late in the 19th century, membership reaching 2,452 in 1900, and 4,000 in 1918, when it merged into the Amalgamated Society of Carpenters and Joiners. A few branches disagreed with the merger and opted to remain independent.

== General Secretaries ==
1830s: William Herbert
1874: Alex Yule
1899: Frank Smith
