= Amalgamated Union of Building Trade Workers =

British trade union

AUBTW
- Amalgamated Union of Building Trade Workers
- Merged into: Amalgamated Society of Woodworkers, Painters and Builders
- Founded: 1921
- Dissolved: 1971
- Headquarters: Crescent Lane, Clapham Common
- Location: United Kingdom
- Members: 70,272 (1968)
- Key people: George Hicks (General Secretary), Luke Fawcett (General Secretary)
- Affiliations: TUC, ITUC, Labour

The Amalgamated Union of Building Trade Workers (AUBTW) was a British trade union.

== History ==
The AUBTW was founded in 1921 when the Operative Society of Masons, Quarrymen and Allied Trades of England and Wales, the Operative Bricklayers' Society and the Manchester Unity of Operative Bricklayers' Society merged. It was joined by the Building and Monumental Workers' Association of Scotland in 1942, the National Builders' Labourers' and Constructional Workers' Society in 1952, the National Society of Street Masons, Paviors and Road Makers in 1966 and the Amalgamated Slaters', Tilers' and Roofing Operatives' Society in 1969.

In 1971, the AUBTW merged with the Amalgamated Society of Woodworkers to form the Amalgamated Society of Woodworkers, Painters and Builders.

== Election results ==
The union sponsored Labour Party candidates in several Parliamentary elections.

Election	Constituency	Candidate	Votes	Percentage	Position
1931 by-election	Woolwich East	George Hicks	16,200	56.7	1
1931 general election	Woolwich East	George Hicks	16,658	50.9	1
1935 general election	Woolwich East	George Hicks	17,563	58.0	1
1945 general election	Woolwich East	George Hicks	18,983	70.4	1
1950 general election	Portsmouth South	Leslie Merrion	17,545	36.1	2
1951 general election	Southend East	Leslie Merrion	19,478	44.7	2
1955 general election	Exeter	Leslie Merrion	18,759	43.7	2
1964 general election	Houghton-le-Spring	Thomas Urwin	32,914	74.8	1
1966 general election	Houghton-le-Spring	Thomas Urwin	32,067	77.5	1
1970 general election	Houghton-le-Spring	Thomas Urwin	32,888	73.4	1

== Leadership ==
=== General Secretaries ===
1921: George Hicks
1941: Luke Fawcett
1951: George Lowthian

=== Presidents ===
1921: George Waddell
1934: Luke Fawcett
1942: Harry Adams
1953: Harry Weaver
