= National Union of Furniture Trade Operatives =

Former trade union of the United Kingdom

- Merged into: Furniture, Timber and Allied Trades Union
- Founded: 1947
- Dissolved: 1971
- Headquarters: Fairfields, Roe Green, Kingsbury, London
- Location: United Kingdom
- Members: 60,754 (1971)
- Key people: Alf Tomkins (General Secretary)
- Affiliations: TUC, ITUC, NFBTO

The National Union of Furniture Trade Operatives (NUFTO) was a trade union in the United Kingdom representing furniture makers.

The union was founded in 1947 by the merger of the National Amalgamated Furnishing Trades Association and the Amalgamated Union of Upholsterers. By the 1960s, the union was keen to merge with other in its sector; in 1969, it absorbed the United French Polishers' Society, and the following year, the Midland Glass Bevellers' and Kindred Trades' Society joined.

By 1971, the union had 60,754 members and, that year, it merged with the Amalgamated Society of Woodcutting Machinists to form the Furniture, Timber and Allied Trades Union.

== Election results ==
The union sponsored Labour Party candidates in several Parliamentary elections.

| Election | Constituency | Candidate | Votes | Percentage | Position |
|---|---|---|---|---|---|
| 1964 general election | Newcastle upon Tyne North | Sidney Lee | 12,515 | 39.1 | 2 |
| 1964 general election | Nottingham South | William Frederick Back | 21,046 | 41.0 | 2 |
| 1970 general election | Shoreditch and Finsbury | Ronald Brown | 14,474 | 66.9 | 1 |

== General Secretaries ==
1947–1971: Alf Tomkins
