= Alliance Cabinet Makers' Association =

British trade union

- Merged into: National Amalgamated Furnishing Trades Association
- Founded: 1865
- Dissolved: 1902
- Headquarters: 72 Finsbury Pavement, London
- Location: United Kingdom
- Members: 5,251 (1901)
- Affiliations: TUC

The Alliance Cabinet Makers' Association was a trade union representing skilled furniture makers in the United Kingdom.

== History ==
In 1865, cabinet makers in London went on strike and won a 10% increase in wages. This success inspired them to form the "Alliance Cabinet Makers' Association". This largely followed a craft union model, requiring high contributions from members, and insisting that members only took on apprentices who were closely related to union members. However, the union accepted all workers in the trade into membership, and was able to make high payments to members in need.

The union was long associated with radical politics, and it affiliated to the First International in 1866. It was also an early affiliate of the Trades Union Congress. Adam Weiler, a prominent Marxist, was an executive member during the 1870s. In 1875, the London Trades Council encouraged the association to test the Criminal Law Amendment Act, 1871's provisions on picketing; five members of the union including London secretary Harry Ham were imprisoned, but they were soon released, and the law was changed shortly after.

By 1867, membership of the union was only 800, but the union's high income permitted it to employ its first full-time general secretary, J. R. Smith. Membership appears to have fallen back to just 200 in two branches in 1872, but a trade boom allowed it to spread across the country, reaching 2,000 members in 1877, in 28 branches. Although branches existed in Limerick, Edinburgh and Plymouth, more than half of the membership was in London, where branches represented different sections of the trade: for example, the "Fancy Cabinet Branch" and the "Chairmakers and Carvers Branch".

During the 1880s, the union led a successful campaign against subcontracting. The union also built up a substantial library of 1,500 volumes for members to educate themselves.

Membership peaked at 5,251 in 1901. The following year, it merged with the United Operative Cabinet and Chairmakers' Society of Scotland to form the National Amalgamated Furnishing Trades Association.

== General Secretaries ==
1865: J. R. Smith
1886: Harry Ham
