= National Amalgamated Furnishing Trades Association =

British trade union

- Predecessor: Alliance Cabinet Makers' Association; United Operative Cabinet and Chairmakers' Society of Scotland
- Merged into: National Union of Furniture Trade Operatives
- Founded: 1902
- Dissolved: 1946
- Headquarters: 219 Golders Green Road, London
- Location: United Kingdom
- Members: 29,263 (1946)
- Key people: Alex Gossip, Alf Tomkins
- Affiliations: TUC, ITUC, Labour

The National Amalgamated Furnishing Trades Association (NAFTA) was a trade union representing workers involved in making furniture in the United Kingdom.

== History ==
The union was founded in 1902 from the merger of the Alliance Cabinet Makers' Association and the United Operative Cabinet and Chairmakers' Society of Scotland. In 1911, the Amalgamated Society of Gilders and Amalgamated Society of French Polishers both merged into the new organisation. In 1907, the union had 7,007 members.

In 1946, the union merged with the Amalgamated Union of Upholsterers to form the National Union of Furniture Trade Operatives.

== Election results ==
In its early years, the union sponsored several Labour Party candidates, some of whom won election.

| Election | Constituency | Candidate | Votes | Percentage | Position |
|---|---|---|---|---|---|
| 1906 general election | Leeds East | James O'Grady | 4,299 | 66.1 | 1 |
| 1910 Jan general election | Leeds East | James O'Grady | 5,873 | 71.8 | 1 |
| 1910 Dec general election | Leeds East | James O'Grady | 4,028 | 68.0 | 1 |
| 1918 general election | Leeds South East | James O'Grady | unopposed | N/A | 1 |
| 1918 general election | Plymouth Devonport | Fred Bramley | 4,115 | 19.3 | 2 |
| 1923 general election | Coventry | A. A. Purcell | 16,346 | 34.2 | 1 |
| 1924 general election | Coventry | A. A. Purcell | 17,888 | 33.4 | 2 |
| 1925 by-election | Forest of Dean | A. A. Purcell | 11,629 | 48.5 | 1 |
| 1929 general election | Hammersmith North | James Patrick Gardner | 17,601 | 56.2 | 1 |

== Leadership ==
=== General Secretaries ===
1902: Harry Ham
1905: Alex Gossip
1941: Alf Tomkins

=== Parliamentary Secretaries ===
1906: James O'Grady
1919: James Patrick Gardner
1937: F. E. Sweetman

=== Assistant General Secretaries ===
1907: H. A. Urie
1937: Alf Tomkins
1946: Alf Bickness
