= Swiss textile and clothing industry =

Textile and garment manufacturing in Switzerland

The Swiss textile and clothing industry encompasses the production of textiles, garments, and footwear in Switzerland. The term textile industry covers all operations for transforming fibers into fabric, including preparation of raw materials (washing, combing), yarn manufacturing (spinning, twisting), fabric production (weaving, knitting), and finishing (bleaching, dyeing, printing, embroidery).

In 1988, the sector represented 6.4% of Swiss exports by value, but this share had declined to 1.7% by 2024. In 2024, the sector exported 4.67 billion Swiss francs, with Germany as the primary destination absorbing 46.1% of exports. The Swiss population remains among the world's largest consumers of clothing, purchasing an average of 60 new garments per person annually, totaling 100,000 tonnes nationwide.

== Trade statistics ==
=== Export performance ===
In 2024, Swiss textile, clothing, and footwear exports totaled 4.67 billion Swiss francs, representing 1.7% of total Swiss exports. Within this total, clothing accounted for 2.88 billion francs (61.7% of sector exports), textiles for 1.06 billion francs (22.6%), and footwear for 736 million francs (15.8%). Germany remained the primary export destination, absorbing 46.1% of sector exports (2.15 billion francs), followed by Italy (13.8%), Poland (5.7%), and France (5.0%). Among the top ten markets, clothing showed the largest nominal share with nine partners, while textiles dominated only in Austria.

Over the period 2014 to 2024, the sector exhibited divergent trends. Textile exports declined by 30% in value and 17% in volume, while clothing and footwear exports more than doubled in both nominal and real terms. Textile exports peaked in 2014 at 1.5 billion francs, clothing exports reached their high of 3.0 billion francs in 2023, and footwear exports peaked at 986 million francs in 2019. The footwear segment suffered a sharp decline during the COVID-19 pandemic in 2020 but subsequently stabilized, returning to its 2017 level.

A significant characteristic of the clothing and footwear export sector is the proportion of returned goods. In 2024, nearly two-thirds (59.6%) of clothing exports and 68.2% of footwear exports consisted of articles re-exported to the initial foreign supplier. This phenomenon is largely explained by e-commerce, where articles returned by customers are re-exported in grouped shipments, primarily to Germany. Despite this upward trend, returned goods play a modest role in overall Swiss foreign trade, representing only 1.1% of total exports in 2024, or 3.2 billion francs.

=== Import trends ===
In 2024, Switzerland imported 11.78 billion francs worth of textiles, clothing, and footwear, accounting for 5.3% of total Swiss imports. Over the thirty-year period from 1988 to 2024, the sector underwent significant structural changes. The decline in nominal textile imports reflected the abandonment of traditional Swiss-origin fabrics, while the growth in clothing and footwear imports resulted uniquely from the traffic of returned goods characterizing these two segments. Although the growing dominance of e-commerce induced a surge (approximately two-thirds) in returned goods in these segments, overall trade was only marginally impacted by this re-exportation phenomenon.

== History ==
=== Medieval and early modern period (before 1800) ===
All medieval Swiss cities housed tailoring and shoemaking workshops, around which other crafts gravitated according to fashion trends. Furriery held an important position until the 16th century due to the medieval preference for fur. Hat-making developed in the 15th and 16th centuries with the production of high felt hats, including the famous conical Basel hat, followed by the manufacture of round, square, and multicolored caps that became black when adopted as functional attributes by clergy, judges, and professors. Wigmakers and hatters influenced fashion in the 17th and 18th centuries by preparing hairstyles, tricornes, and bicornes.

The demand for semi-finished products (threads, fabrics, leathers) and fashionable supplies among tailors (lace, feathers, braids, buttons, hooks, eyelets, belts) and cobblers (buckles, tongues) brought other craftsmen into the sector, including weavers (linen, wool, cotton, silk) and tanners, as well as manufacturers of belts, needles, buttons, ribbons, and passementerie makers. In the early 16th century, the arrival of knitted and woven stockings from the Spanish court led to the rapid development of new craftsmen: manufacturers of breeches and stockings, called Lismer in German-speaking Switzerland, who also knitted gloves, caps, and wool bonnets, and hosiers following the invention of the stocking loom in 1589.

In the 13th and 14th centuries, furriers, tailors, and shoemakers—sometimes united with tanners—created their guilds in Alemannic-speaking cities (later also in Western and Southern Switzerland), the first being the Basel furriers' guild in 1226. Journeyman societies emerged in the 15th and 16th centuries, parallel to master associations. Later, clothing craftsmen and subcontractors joined existing guilds, integrating according to the city into those of tailors, weavers, or mercers (hatters and hosiers, for example). The rule was not to manufacture clothes in series but made-to-measure in craftsmen's workshops. In the 17th and 18th centuries, tailoring and shoemaking were trades of the poor, partly practiced by Hintersassen (inhabitants without citizenship rights). Masters were assisted by their wives and children, but except in lingerie, women were not allowed to practice an autonomous trade.

==== Protoindustrial textile production ====
In Switzerland as throughout Europe, textile production was the first to industrialize. Previously, it was carried out by artisans organized in corporations and working on commission, but also by peasant households, which commonly engaged in spinning and even weaving, sometimes practiced within a rural corporate framework. Demographic growth from the 15th century pushed poor rural populations to seek additional income through home-based work for the account of weaver bosses established in cities or the countryside. Growing demand, both on the domestic market and for export, imposed the introduction of mass production from the end of the 16th century. The innovations linked to protoindustrialization had to prevail against the will of corporations, which only admitted workshop work; these included on one hand the centralizing manufactory, prefiguring the factory in the 17th and 18th centuries, and on the other hand the Kaufsystem and Verlagssystem, which allowed very decentralized organization of home-based work.

Protoindustrial textiles differed markedly from urban crafts, which they supplanted in predominance, as they also affected rural populations, creating genuine industrial regions where city and countryside contributed equally to production. It was already quite advanced in Switzerland at the end of the 18th century, employing tens of thousands of people (entrepreneurs and workers, men, women, and children), of whom 5% worked in manufactories and 95% at home. Hosiery (knitting of stockings, vests, and other garment pieces) provided employment between Basel and Schaffhausen, passing through the Prince-Bishopric of Basel, the Solothurn region, Aargau, and northern Lucerne; linen cloth (flax) in the elevated parts of the Swiss Plateau (Emmental, Upper Aargau, Willisau, Entlebuch); passementerie (silk ribbons) in the Canton of Basel; silk weaving in the Canton of Zurich; schappe spinning (silk) in Central Switzerland; straw plaiting in the Freie Ämter; cotton spinning and weaving from Geneva to the Rhine, particularly in what is now Aargau, Zurich, Glarus, St. Gallen (Toggenburg), and the two Appenzells; cotton printing (indiennes) in the cantons or future cantons of Geneva, Neuchâtel, Bern, Aargau, Zurich, and Glarus. In 1787, the Zurich and Aargau regions alone counted 46,000 spinners and 8,700 weavers of both sexes.

Linen cloth still dominated protoindustry in the 17th century. In the following century, it yielded to cotton, with which the Confederation had risen by around 1790 to second place in Europe, behind England. England then began to conquer the continent with its mechanical yarns. This competition accelerated the mechanization of modern textile industry which, in the first half of the 19th century, established itself in the old protoindustrial regions of Switzerland: first came cotton spinning (from 1801), then its weaving (at a slower pace, from the 1840s), the process being completed before 1888. Other sectors followed slowly. Home-based work remained predominant where its low cost gave a competitive advantage: in passementerie, silk weaving, embroidery, and straw plaiting.

==== Rural expansion and cottage industry ====
Demographic growth in the 16th century favored the opening of tailoring, shoemaking, and weaving workshops in rural areas to meet the population's basic needs. These trades formed guilds (master associations, confraternities) on the urban model in the Bernese, Lucerne, Solothurn, and Basel countryside, in southern Aargau, in Central Switzerland, and later in Eastern Switzerland. Labor was more abundant in rural areas than in cities because non-professional day work for low pay was authorized there, especially since day laborers in tailoring and shoemaking were part of peasant households like other day laborers. Clothing constituted a large part of rural crafts (for example, 30 to 40% in the Zurich Unterland). In the clothing sector, it was a matter of satisfying massive demand. Moreover, trades that were easy to learn and requiring little tooling attracted large numbers of poor small farmers and Tauner (cottagers), resulting in chronic overemployment.

Under the Ancien Régime, knitting and straw plaiting provided income to the poor. In the 17th and 18th centuries, entire families knitted breeches, stockings, bonnets, or gloves (work at home), plaited straw, sewed and trimmed hats. These activities were often associated with agricultural day labor. Indigenous linen thread and rye straw were easily accessible materials for knitters and plaiters who worked partly for merchant-manufacturers (Verlagssystem), partly on their own account, then selling their products themselves at markets or peddling them over a wider radius. In the 17th century, the knitting of breeches and stockings was widespread in Upper Aargau, in the Zurich Unterland (Rümlang), and in the Basel countryside as a cottage industry. In the 18th century, hosiery (Basel countryside, Aargau) was added, as well as straw plaiting and hat-making in the Freiamt (Wohlen AG) and in the Rafzerfeld (Hüntwangen, Wil ZH).

==== Colonial connections and the indienne trade ====
Printed cotton fabrics known as indiennes originated in India, which initially held a monopoly on the production technique. European manufacturers, particularly the British and Dutch, later adopted and mechanized these methods, creating cheaper alternatives that undermined Indian textile producers. The resulting European-made indiennes proved so commercially successful that traditional textile producers in France successfully lobbied Louis XIV to ban their manufacture and importation. Switzerland benefited from this French prohibition when Huguenot refugees established textile operations in Geneva and Neuchâtel, supplying the French market through illicit trade networks. By 1785, the Fabrique-Neuve at Cortaillod near Neuchâtel had become Europe's largest indienne producer, manufacturing 160,000 pieces annually.

The commercial success of Swiss indiennes was connected to the Atlantic slave trade. These textiles served as trade goods in Africa, where they were exchanged for enslaved persons destined for the Americas. Historical records indicate that Swiss textiles could constitute a substantial portion of cargo on slave ships; one 1789 voyage to Angola carried Swiss fabrics valued at three-quarters of the ship's total trade goods. Swiss textile firms also provided financial backing for slaving expeditions. Between 1783 and 1792, the Basel company Christoph Burckardt & Cie helped finance 21 voyages that forcibly transported over 7,000 Africans across the Atlantic. Multiple Swiss cities with textile industries—including Geneva, Neuchâtel, Aarau, Zurich, and Basel—derived economic benefits from these connections to the slave trade.

=== 19th and 20th centuries ===
==== Industrialization of textile industry ====
The textile industry reached its peak around 1870, employing nearly 150,000 people, or 12% of the Swiss active population, mostly in the Basel region, in the Zurich-Glarus-St. Gallen triangle, as well as in Aargau and Thurgau. The proportion of factory workers rose from only 25% around 1850 to 46% in 1880-1882 and 57% in 1901-1905. Between 1870 and 1910, textiles declined in Aargau but developed in Eastern Switzerland (St. Gallen, Thurgau, the two Appenzells) where, thanks to the boom in embroidery, sector employment increased by 90% (from 46,100 to 87,600; from 2,300 to 11,800 in the St. Gallen region itself).

Mechanization of textile production began with cotton spinning in 1799, when a St. Gallen enterprise acquired machines capable of spinning, combing, drawing, and pre-spinning cotton. From 1801, several cotton spinning mills opened in Zurich, Eastern Switzerland, and Aargau. The arrival of the fully automatic spinning mule caused an enormous boom in cotton spinning, which increased its spindles tenfold between 1836 and 1880; the number of companies decreased by one-tenth, but the remaining ones were larger. The next technological leap occurred around 1880 with the ring spinning frame. The sector then experienced a merger movement due to growing protectionism in foreign countries and competitive pressure.

Outside of cotton, mechanical spinning developed later and with much less vigor: in silk (from 1824), flax (from 1839), and export wool, combed or not (from 1866). Silk spinning did not resist Italian competition (forty-one companies in 1842, mostly Ticinese, four in 1865, two in 1900). Flax and wool spinning, lacking indigenous raw materials, remained modest, as imported yarns were also cheaper. Mechanical weaving of cotton appeared in the 1840s and conquered almost the entire cotton industry between the late 1860s and 1888. After 1850, it slowly gained ground in silk: in Zurich around 1900, it had multiplied production by 3.5, relying on electrification.

==== Raw materials trade and colonial exploitation ====
By the mid-19th century, Switzerland had established itself as a major hub for international commodity trading. Swiss merchants operated global networks buying and selling materials including Indian cotton, Japanese silk, and West African cocoa, with profits accruing in Switzerland despite the goods never entering the country physically. Following the American Civil War and the abolition of slavery in the United States, disruptions to cotton supplies increased the strategic importance of Indian production. The Swiss firm Volkart, which had begun Indian operations in 1851, expanded its raw cotton trade by working within the framework of British colonial administration.

British colonial policies imposed cotton cultivation requirements on Indian farmers while extracting land taxes for the colonial treasury. These measures, combined with railway expansion across the subcontinent, enabled Volkart to control approximately ten percent of cotton exports to European textile manufacturers. Operating from its Winterthur headquarters, the company supplied mills across Italy, northern France, Belgium, the German Ruhr region, and Switzerland. While Volkart employees were instructed to avoid overtly racist conduct, the company adopted certain British colonial practices, including maintaining segregated recreational facilities that excluded Indian personnel.

The Basel Mission, a Protestant missionary organization founded in 1815 by Swiss and German religious groups, pursued conversion efforts in southern India, particularly in areas of present-day Kerala and Karnataka. The organization achieved results primarily among lower-caste populations who gained educational access through conversion. However, religious conversion often resulted in converts being ostracized from their communities and losing traditional livelihoods. The Mission addressed this problem of its own making by establishing textile mills to employ converts. By the 1860s, the organization operated four spinning facilities and had developed export markets throughout British colonial territories, including Africa, the Near East, and Australia.

==== Development of ready-to-wear clothing ====
Hosiery and knitting, structured according to the Verlagssystem principle, produced finished garments (stockings, gloves, caps) earlier than other sectors. Around 1800, Basel wool merchants had installed more than 600 home-based stocking looms for the manufacture of elastic knitted fabrics. Manual knitting and mechanical hosiery were also widespread in the Bern, Geneva, and Solothurn regions. As fashion changed, the manufacture of knitted garment pieces practically ceased. The sector regained importance with the invention of the knitting machine (1866), the circular loom (1861), and the cotton loom with automatic stitch modification (1868), enabling the manufacture of underwear and outerwear. Production centers were now located in the cantons of Solothurn, Basel-Landschaft, and Thurgau. This cheap mass production sold well. Around 1900, fine knitting and hosiery became important export sectors. In the 1920s, the emergence of large companies signaled the end of the Verlagssystem. Numerous tiny companies survived, however, still employing nearly 2,500 people in 1939. The sector experienced growth into the 1960s despite losing market share to American competition (nylon stockings).

From the 1820s, work clothes were being made in France and ladies' coats in Germany. They were imported into Switzerland mainly as second-hand goods until 1870, then as cheap mass products. Their distribution was ensured by retail businesses that increasingly engaged tailors for alterations or to supplement their offerings with their own production. The first dedicated ready-to-wear companies emerged after 1840 for cotton articles, after 1875 for wool articles, and after 1880 for lingerie. Tailors took virtually no part in the birth of the ready-to-wear industry.

Until World War I, the industry hardly benefited from the expanding clothing market. In 1910, tailoring workshops still employed 62,400 people, compared to only 5,822 in the ready-to-wear industry. The improvement of commercial and political conditions during and after the war (trade restrictions, import quotas from 1920 to 1923 and in 1932, tariff revisions of 1920 and 1922) allowed the industry to substitute its own production for imports, with its market thus reaching the critical size necessary for industrial production. Ready-to-wear established itself more or less quickly in different clothing sectors. Lingerie and menswear lent themselves particularly well to mass production as they were not subject to fashion imperatives and hardly needed to be adjusted to individual measurements. For this reason, the lingerie industry immediately concentrated in large companies, which nevertheless entrusted the bulk of their production to home workers until the 1930s.

In the 19th century, menswear (which relied on predominantly male labor) was practically limited to the manufacture of simple shirts and work clothes available in only six different sizes. Unlike in the United States, the narrowness of the market did not allow offering a whole range of standardized sizes. Nevertheless, men's suits were made from 1890. Until World War I, production focused on the urban market; large, poorly mechanized companies hardly competed with crafts. Womenswear faced more difficulties at the beginning. Only coats, blouses, combinations, and aprons could be mass-produced. Other garment pieces required fitting. The diversity of articles, frequent fashion changes, and strong seasonal fluctuations were also obstacles to mass production. Thus, not large but medium-sized companies emerged, centralizing only demanding operations (cutting, sewing, pattern and buttonhole making); sewing work was performed by home workers. This division of labor persisted because the small number of pieces to be made did not allow the use of multi-needle sewing machines. Until the 1940s, the clothing industry remained poorly mechanized. It employed men for cutting and buttonholes, so the proportion of women working in this sector fell to about 95%. The Verlagssystem also allowed the manufacture of ready-to-wear suits, leading to a steady increase in the share of ready-to-wear (60–70% in 1940) in overall clothing production.

==== Footwear industry development and contraction ====
Shoemakers constituted a traditional craft of major importance. In the early modern period and until around 1900, shoemakers often played a leading role in uprisings and revolutionary movements. Until the mid-19th century, shoe manufacturing in Switzerland was organized by guilds. Domestic production covered most demand, supplemented by sales from German and French traveling merchants.

The first Swiss shoe factory, the current Elgg AG, was created in Winterthur in 1847. Four years later, Carl Franz Bally began producing shoes in Schönenwerd. Industrial manufacturing was distinguished from manual production not so much by the use of machines as by the division of labor. In the 1860s and 1870s, several shoe factories were founded near Schönenwerd, often by former Bally company workers. Others established themselves in northeastern Switzerland and in the Canton of Zurich. The Swiss industry began exporting shoes around 1860, importing know-how and machines primarily from Great Britain and the United States. At the end of the 19th century, large companies formed. In 1888, 33 shoe factories employed 3,755 people. By 1911, there were 83 factories with 8,463 employees.

Despite a shortage of raw materials, the sector developed during World War I. With foreign competition having disappeared and strong domestic and foreign demand for military shoes, sales reached a record. In 1921, a crisis led to a drastic decline in production and massive layoffs. The situation worsened in the late 1920s when Czech manufacturer Bata began producing low-priced shoes in Möhlin in Aargau. In 1934, the sector benefited from protectionist measures. The Federal Council prohibited the opening and expansion of factories, preventing increased production. Shoe manufacturing declined significantly during World War II. It resumed in the mid-1940s and progressed steadily into the 1960s, benefiting notably from the employment of cheaper foreign labor. In this sector, the labor coefficient is high and wages account for a large share of production costs. The share of foreign labor amounted to 8% in 1952, rising to 47% in 1962.

Imports from low-wage countries strongly compressed prices in the 1970s, leading to the disappearance of more than half of Swiss shoe manufacturers. Annual domestic production still amounted to 10 million pairs of shoes in 1937. It fell to 8 million in 1986, then only 3.79 million in 1994 and approximately 1.79 million in 2005. Personnel numbers decreased by four-fifths from 1963 to 1994, falling to 2,319 employees, then 951 in 2000 and 670 in 2005. In 2005, Swiss shoes were mainly produced in Ticino, where the industry benefited from the low wages of cross-border workers, who represented one-third of the workforce.

==== Textile industry decline ====
To remain competitive against Europe and North America, machine parks had to be modernized. Automation began shortly after 1900, for example in embroidery, where it proved highly productive by eliminating embroiderers. Evolution brought, especially in the main sectors (cotton, silk, embroidery), a concentration process that resulted in a constant decrease in employment and companies, except for a brief surge after 1918. The trend strengthened during the Great Depression of the 1930s and was not reversed by the ephemeral improvement that followed World War II. From the 1960s, the relocation of production to Eastern Europe and Asia for cost reasons accelerated the decline of Swiss textiles: more than half the factories and more than four-fifths of jobs disappeared between 1965 and 2001. Companies that survived knew how to reconvert, for example into fabrics for special clothing (protection against extreme temperatures, dangerous radiation, injury risks, helmets), textiles for medical use (artificial veins, heart valves, implants), or industrial use (seat coverings, airbags, safety belts and nets for airplanes and automobiles; conveyor belts; "geotextiles" for civil engineering).

The textile industry changed in its structures and character. The transition to synthetic fibers and computer techniques (in design and printing) strengthened the weight of capital at the expense of the labor factor, formerly predominant. Embroidery especially, which employed more than 65,000 people in factories and at home in 1905, became in the early 21st century a highly specialized sector with few collaborators but innovative and with high added value. The era of cheap mass production ended in Switzerland in the 1980s.

==== Clothing industry organization and competition ====
After 1910, the division of labor that had proven successful in womenswear also prevailed in other sectors of the industry (including mass production). Until the 1920s, machine-made seams were deprecated and could only be used in invisible places. Once this rule was relaxed, the proportion of women also increased in previously male-dominated menswear, reaching 74% of employees in 1937.

Clothing manufacturing long resisted rationalization. Home work allowed for cost reduction. Home workers constituted flexible and cheap labor, as wage costs and fixed expenses (machines, workshops) were genuinely advantageous. Companies of a certain size worked with subcontractors who controlled or even centralized the task of home workers. People employed by subcontractors were not subject to factory law protection measures, working hours were generally higher, and piece-rate wages lower. The importance of this form of enterprise (sweatshop) in Switzerland is difficult to estimate, but it must have been smaller than in foreign production centers; it declined in favor of large companies from World War II onward.

Around 1900, the clothing industry recruited about one-third of home workers from the lower middle class. These young women had learned sewing in domestic economy schools. They did not sew only to earn a living but also to prepare for their future role as housewives. Since wages were not their primary concern, they were often considered to exert downward pressure on wages and contributed to the sector's low wage level. After World War II, this cheap labor was replaced by the engagement of a comparatively high number of foreign workers (66% in 1995).

In the late 1930s, the Swiss clothing industry controlled nearly 100% of the domestic market, but it rapidly lost its dominant position after World War II. Despite falling market shares, companies—whose numbers and workforce declined from 1960—managed to increase production until 1978. From the 1960s, there was a decrease in small companies and small production workshops working for large firms. At the end of the 20th century, the womenswear and lingerie industries continued to export successfully. In international comparison, the share of imports coming directly from countries with very low wage levels was small; higher was the share from companies located in European Union member countries (especially Germany), which relocated part of their production. The Swiss clothing industry, composed essentially of small and medium-sized enterprises, long refrained from this practice, thus losing part of its competitiveness. Recently, Swiss companies also began to relocate part of production (sewing work) to low-wage countries. In 1995, they contributed more than 10% to the sector's turnover. Hungary was the main partner in this passive finishing trade in the late 1990s, soon followed by Russia.

Focused on the urban market, the clothing industry initially concentrated in the cities of Zurich and St. Gallen. Around 1940, companies began to relocate part of production to rural or border regions where wages were lower. This trend strengthened with the increase in international competition in the 1960s. The Zurich industry especially turned increasingly to Ticino, which became the main production site. In 1987, 76% of the sector's personnel worked in the six main producing cantons: Ticino, St. Gallen, Aargau, Thurgau, Lucerne, and Zurich.

== Contemporary developments ==
=== Air freight and fast fashion ===
During the 2020s, Switzerland has experienced a substantial increase in clothing imports transported by air, particularly from online retail platforms including Temu and Shein. Data from late 2024 indicates that approximately one in seven garments entering Switzerland arrived by air transport, with China accounting for over three-quarters of this traffic. Annual air imports of textiles, clothing, and leather goods reached 22,000 tonnes in 2024, with Chinese shipments comprising 17,000 tonnes of this total. Monthly volumes peaked in autumn 2024 at over 2,000 tonnes.

Air transport of fashion goods carries significant environmental costs. Air freight from Guangzhou, China, to Zurich produces 49 times the greenhouse gas emissions compared to ocean shipping to Genoa followed by road transport into Switzerland. By December 2024, direct air shipments accounted for 13.9% of all clothing imports and 30.1% of Chinese clothing imports. This growth reflects the business model of platforms like Shein and Temu, which emphasize rapid delivery of low-cost Chinese merchandise directly to consumer households.

Within China's total air freight exports to Switzerland in 2024, textiles and clothing represented roughly 40% of volume, marking the product category with the strongest growth. Total 2024 volumes would require the cargo capacity of approximately 470 freight aircraft, with textiles, clothing, and leather goods accounting for roughly 170 aircraft loads.

=== Sustainable fashion movement ===
Swiss consumers rank among the world's highest per capita clothing purchasers, trailing only Luxembourg in expenditure levels. Annual consumption averages 60 new garments per person, totaling 100,000 tonnes nationally. This consumption pattern has prompted the emergence of a slow fashion movement advocating ethical and ecological alternatives. The movement encourages reduced consumption, increased use of second-hand clothing, upcycling practices, and preference for locally manufactured items.

The Geneva-based organization Coordination textile genevoise processes approximately 2,200 tonnes of used clothing annually through its collection operations. Sustainable fashion advocates emphasize multiple strategies including consumption reduction, seeking alternatives to new purchases through vintage markets and clothing exchanges, repair rather than replacement, and selecting natural over synthetic materials.

== Employer and worker organizations ==
The Swiss textile and clothing industries immediately faced competition from more rationalized foreign industries. Numerous employer associations emerged, including the Association of Swiss Men's Clothing Manufacturers (founded 1899) and the Swiss Association of the Ready-to-Wear and Lingerie Industry (founded 1919), which primarily sought to obtain import taxes comparable to those prevailing in neighboring countries. In 1943, these two groups together created the Swiss Clothing Industry Association (including hosiery). From 1972, the sector's interests were defended by the Swiss Clothing Industry Association (Swissfashion), which merged in 1998 with the Swiss Textile Federation (Swisstextiles), thereafter serving as spokesperson for the Swiss Textile and Clothing Industry Association.

In the textile sector, employers' associations united Swiss cotton spinners (1874), then finishers, silk fabric manufacturers, and linen and wool industrialists, among others. After a series of mergers, they regrouped in 1991 into the Swiss Textile Federation. Members of the Employers' Association of the Textile Industry (1906) worked primarily in cotton.

On the workers' side in clothing, the Swiss Federation of Tailors, founded in 1891, associated with the hairdressers' union in 1918. The Federation of Clothing Workers and Similar Trades merged in 1923 with the Swiss Leather Workers' Federation under the name Swiss Federation of Clothing and Leather Workers. Excluded from the Swiss Trade Union Federation (USS) in 1930 due to communist positions and dissolved in 1938, it was replaced by the Swiss Clothing, Leather and Equipment Workers' Union, created in 1930 with USS support. The Swiss Federation of Hat and Cap Workers, founded in 1904, and the Swiss Association of Home Workers in the Ready-to-Wear and Lingerie Industry, created in 1942, were attached to it, which itself became a branch of the Swiss Metalworkers' and Watchmakers' Union in 1992.

In textiles, the Swiss Federation of Textile Workers was only established in 1903. Becoming the Federation of Textile Workers and Factory Workers, it joined in 1963, after several mergers, the Union of Textiles, Chemicals and Paper; this merged in 1993 with the Union of Construction and Wood into the Union of Construction and Industry, which itself merged in 2004 into the large entity Unia. Other union organizations also existed, notably the Christian Federation of Textile and Clothing Workers in Switzerland.

== Labor and social conditions ==
=== Textile sector ===
The success of textiles in Switzerland between the 15th and late 19th centuries was partly based, as in present-day low-wage Asian countries, on an abundant supply of unskilled and cheap labor. In rural areas, Tauner had to find wage-earning activities. Generally, spinning, weaving, and straw plaiting offered seasonal (especially winter) supplementary income to these landless peasants who, at other times, hired themselves out by the day in agriculture or various trades. As with artisans, the entire family, including children, participated in work that ensured survival. However, textiles employed a majority of women, less well paid than men (share of female workers in textile factories: 66% in 1870, 65.3% in 1929, 62% in 1937, 58.2% in 1955, 48.9% in 1972; in straw plaiting: 70% in 1923, 60.1% in 1937; in embroidery: 68.7% in 1972). Female wages in cotton spinning were one-third lower than those of a simple laborer before 1900.

Subject to fashion vagaries and highly sensitive to economic conditions, the textile industry, especially indienne printing, embroidery, passementerie, and straw plaiting, experienced phases that were alternately euphoric (massive hiring, investments) and strongly depressive (unemployment). In mechanical embroidery in Eastern Switzerland, the number of home-based looms first increased from 770 to more than 10,000 between 1865 and 1876. Then, with fashion having changed in 1920-1921, tens of thousands of jobs were lost and thousands of machines were scrapped. Home-based work had disappeared in certain sectors before 1900; in embroidery, it continued to grow after 1876 (more than 35,000 people in 1905). It also persisted in Basel passementerie and Zurich silk (more than 20,000 people around 1905 in these two sectors). It represented 75% of textile workers around 1850, 54% around 1880, 43% around 1900, but played only a negligible role in 1950.

At home or in factories, textiles were long the primary employer in the Swiss secondary sector: its share stood at 63% around 1880, then declined rapidly: 22% around 1930, 3% in 1965, barely 0.5% in 2001. Wages differed by sector. They were particularly low, before the conclusion of the collective agreement of 1946, in straw plaiting, where seasonal workers were hired, in factories as at home, at the rate of an agricultural day laborer. In contrast, shuttle embroiderers in Eastern Switzerland, who considered themselves the elite of textile workers and were organized in unions from 1894, fought for better wages and reduced working hours through various means, including strikes. The principle of minimum wage was in effect in embroidery from 1917 to 1922; it prevailed in home-based work thanks to the 1940 law and its implementing ordinances, until the elimination in 1980 of wage differences with factory workers.
