= International Graphical Federation =

Global union federation (1949–1999)

- Fédération graphique internationale
- Merged into: Union Network International
- Founded: 13 May 1949
- Dissolved: 31 December 1999
- Headquarters: Monbijoustrasse 73, Bern, Switzerland
- Members: 1.2 million (1994)
- Publication: Journal of the International Graphical Federation
- Affiliations: ICFTU

The International Graphical Federation (IGF) was a global union federation bringing together unions of printing workers around the world.

== History ==
Moved to establish the federation began in 1939, when the Lithographers' International, International Typographers' Secretariat, and International Federation of Bookbinders and Kindred Trades, agreed to merge. However, due to World War II, no progress was made until 1946, when the British Printing and Kindred Trades Federation established a committee which drafted a constitution for a merged organisation.

The federation was established at its first meeting, in Stockholm in 1949. It agreed to operate on a non-political basis, instead focusing on responses to technical developments in the industry, and sharing information on industrial disputes, employment and health and safety standards in each country.

The federation had three boards, covering typography, lithography and bookbinding, and each agreed policies which were put to the body's congress. An executive committee with fifteen members co-ordinated the federation's activities, while a bureau of the general secretary, president, and four representatives of the country in which the headquarters were located, ran the organisation between executive committee meetings.

The IGF affiliated to the International Confederation of Free Trade Unions (ICFTU), but its membership was suspended in 1967, as it had permitted the French Federation of Book Workers, a communist union from France, to affiliate.

At the end of 1999, the federation merged with the Communications International, the International Federation of Employees, Technicians and Managers, and the Media and Entertainment International, to form Union Network International.

== Affiliates ==
In 1979, the following unions were affiliated to the federation:

Union	Country	Affiliated membership
Union of Printing and Paper	Austria	24,272
Paper and Publishing Industry Union	Belgium	15,219
Sindicato de Artes Graficas de Bogota	Colombia	101
Cyprus Industrial and Hotel Employees' Federation	Cyprus	380
Danish Typographical Union	Denmark	11,387
Danish Bookbinders' and Stationers' Union	Denmark	8,951
Danish Lithographers' Union	Denmark	2,742
Finnish Printers' and Bookbinders' Union	Finland	23,454
French Federation of Book Workers	France	60,402
Printing and Paper Union	West Germany	158,180
National Graphical Association	United Kingdom	107,723
Society of Graphical and Allied Trades	United Kingdom	133,500
Society of Lithographic Artists, Designers, Engravers and Process Workers	United Kingdom	21,261
National Union of Wallcoverings, Decorative and Allied Trades	United Kingdom	3,369
Printing and Allied Workers' Union	Guyana	500
Hid Islenzka Prentarafelag	Iceland	409
Grafiska Sveinafelagid	Iceland	89
Indian Federation of Graphical Workers	India	1,314
Press Mazdoor Sabha	India	1,550
Irish Graphical Society	Ireland	1,524
National Union of Printing Workers in Israel	Israel	3,960
Italian Federation of Book Workers	Italy	28,000
Printers' and Bookbinders' Union in the Lebanese Republic	Lebanon	600
Federation of Printing Workers of Luxembourg	Luxembourg	609
Mauritius Printing Workers' Union	Mauritius	104
Norwegian Graphical Union	Norway	14,123
Typographical Union of Rhodesia	Rhodesia	1,968
South African Typographical Union	South Africa	19,928
Swedish Graphic Workers' Union	Sweden	39,472
Swiss Typographers' Union	Switzerland	15,316
Swiss Bookbinders' and Carton Makers' Union	Switzerland	3,324
Swiss Lithographers' Union	Switzerland	6,279
Press Workers' Union of Turkey	Turkey	4,497
Union of Commercial and Industrial Workers	Trinidad and Tobago	396
Graphic Arts International Union	United States	91,394

== Leadership ==
=== Secretaries ===
1949: Karl Woerler
1964: Heinz Göke
1981: Alfred Kaufmann
1990: Bob Tomlins
1994: Chris Pate
1997: Olav Boye
1997: Adriana Rosenzvaig
2000: Adriana Rosenzvaig

=== Chairs ===
1949: Adolf Schäfer
1955: Friedrich Segessenmann
1958: Ernst Leuenberger
1967: John Bonfield
1976: Leonhard Mahlein
1983: Erwin Ferlemann
1994: Rene van Tilborg
