= Avenir Social =

Avenir Social may refer to:

- AvenirSocial, a Swiss labor union
- L'Avenir Social, a French anarchist orphanage (1906–1922)
- L'Avenir Social (newspaper), the newspaper of the Belgian Labour Party
