= Willi Schuh =

Swiss musicologist (1900–1986)

Willi Schuh (12 November 1900 – 4 October 1986) was a Swiss musicologist. He was particularly noted for his research on the life and works of the composer Richard Strauss.

== Life ==
Schuh was born in Basel on 12 November 1900. He initially studied music with Eugen Kutschera and Werner Wehrli in Aarau and with Eugen Papst in Bern. From 1920 he was a private student Walter Courvoisier in Munich. At the same time he studied musical composition with Anton Beer-Walbrunn at the Hochschule für Musik und Theater München. In 1922 Schuh began studying musicology with Adolf Sandberger at the University of Music and Performing Arts Munich and art, literature and theatre history with Heinrich Wölfflin, Fritz Strich and Artur Kutscher. In 1924 he continued his studies in Bern with Ernst Kurth and others. He gained his doctorate in 1927 on the thema Formenprobleme bei Heinrich Schütz.

From 1928 Schuh initially worked in Zurich as a music critic for the Neue Zürcher Zeitung. From 1944 to 1965 he was their music editor. At the Zurich University of the Arts he taught music history between 1930 and 1944 and harmony theory between 1939 and 1944.

Between 1934 and 1936 Schuh was co-publisher of the Mitteilungen der Schweizer Musikforschenden Gesellschaft, from 1941 to 1968 he worked as editor of the Schweizer Musikzeitung.

The central theme of Schuh's musicological research was the composer Richard Strauss. Schuh was in contact with the composer from 1936 until Strauss died in 1949. Another focus of his work was the Swiss composer Othmar Schoeck.

Schuh was a member of the Swiss Music Pedagogic Association from 1931 to 1939 and of the International Musicological Society from 1967 to 1972.

Schuh died in Zürich at the age of 85 and found his final resting place in the Zurich Manneg Cemetery.

== Work ==
- The New Grove Dictionary of Music and Musicians. 2nd ed. New York 2001 [Mitarb.]
- (Edit.): Schweizer Musikbuch. I Part: Geschichte der Musik in der Schweiz. Zürich 1939 (Willi Schuh is available for free viewing and download at the Internet Archive); II Part: Schweizer Musiker-Lexikon. Zürich 1939 (Willi Schuh is available for free viewing and download at the Internet Archive); New edition 1964.
- Richard Strauss Jugend und frühe Meisterjahre. Lebenschronik 1864–1898. Zürich 1976.
- Kritiken und Essays. 4 volumes. Zürich 1947–1954. (1st volume. Über Opern v. Rich. Strauss)
- Straussiana aus vier Jahrzehnten. 1968.
- Umgang mit Musik. Zürich 1970.
- Der Rosenkavalier. 1968.

=== English translations ===
- Schuh, Willi (1982). Richard Strauss: A Chronicle of the Early Years 1864-1898. Translated by Whittall, Mary. Cambridge: Cambridge University Press. ISBN 978-0-521-24104-5.
