= Hans Düby =

Swiss politician (1906–1978)

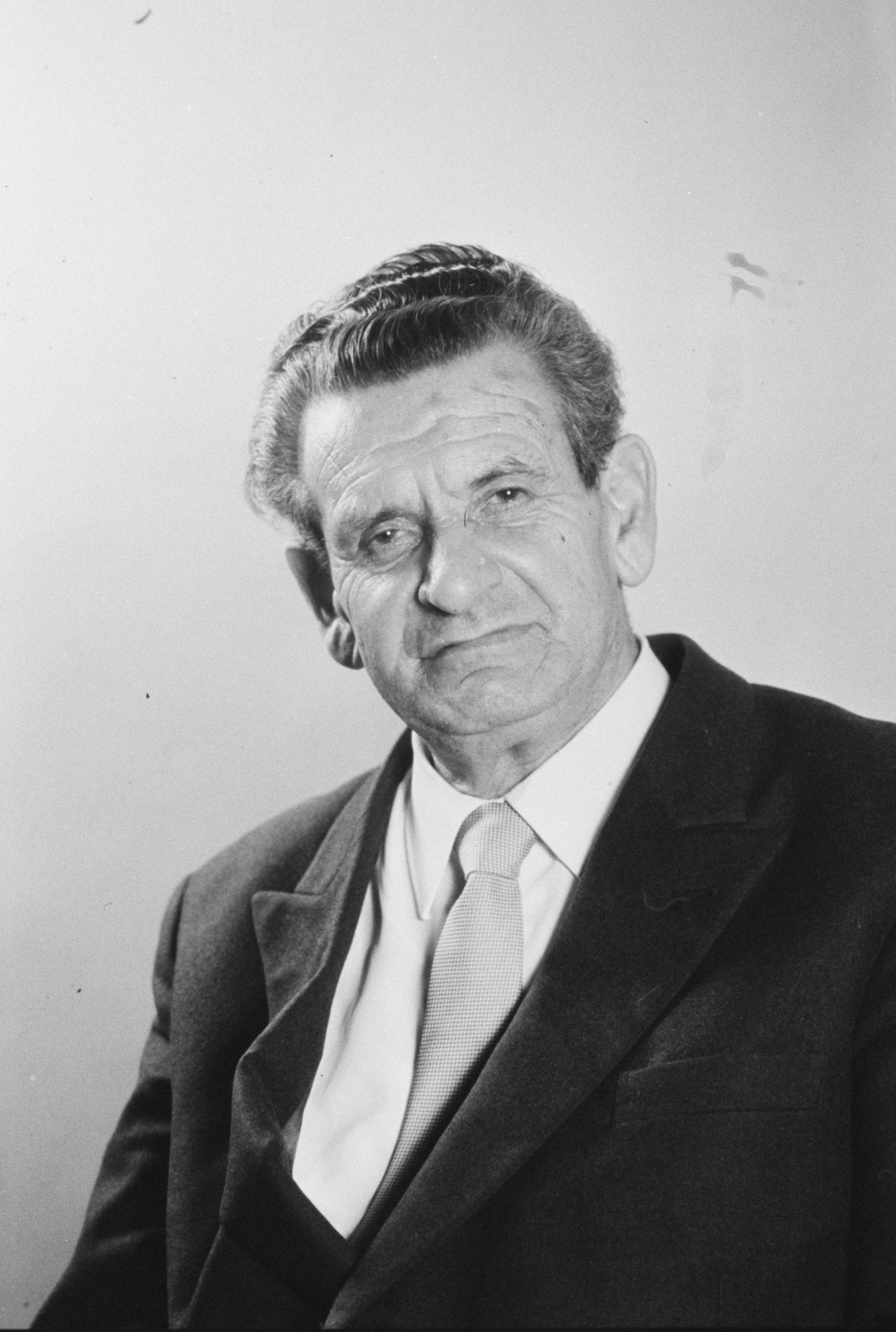
Hans Düby (1971)

Hans Düby (30 January 1906 – 31 March 1978) was a Swiss trade unionist and politician.

Born in Basel, Düby was the son of Emil, who later became the leader of the Swiss Railwaymen's Association. Düby studied music in Bern at the Conservatoire, but then in 1925 undertook an apprenticeship with the Swiss Federal Railways. On completing the apprenticeship, he was taken on permanently as an administrative officer.

In 1937, Düby joined the Swiss Railwaymen's Association (SEV), and in 1941 he became a branch secretary. From 1943, he began working full-time for the union as editor of its journal, Eisenbahner. In 1954, he was elected as the SEV's general secretary, the leading role in the union. In 1960, his title was changed to president, but he remained the union's leader. He also became a vice-president of the Swiss Federation of Trade Unions, and served on the executive of the International Transport Workers' Federation (ITF). In 1965, he was elected as president of the ITF.

Düby was also active in the Socialist Party of Switzerland. He was elected to Bern City Council in 1945, and to the Grand Council of Bern the following year. In 1955, he was instead elected to the Swiss Federal Assembly, again representing Bern.

Düby was elected to the Swiss Federal Railways' Board of Directors in 1963. He retired from his trade union posts in 1971, then stood down from the Federal Assembly in 1975. He died three years later.

Trade union offices
Preceded by Robert Bratschi	Leader of the Swiss Railwaymen's Association; 1953–1971	Succeeded by Werner Meier
Preceded by Frank Cousins	President of the International Transport Workers' Federation; 1965–1971	Succeeded by Fritz Prechtl
