= Guido Nobel =

Swiss executive, politician (1922–2002)

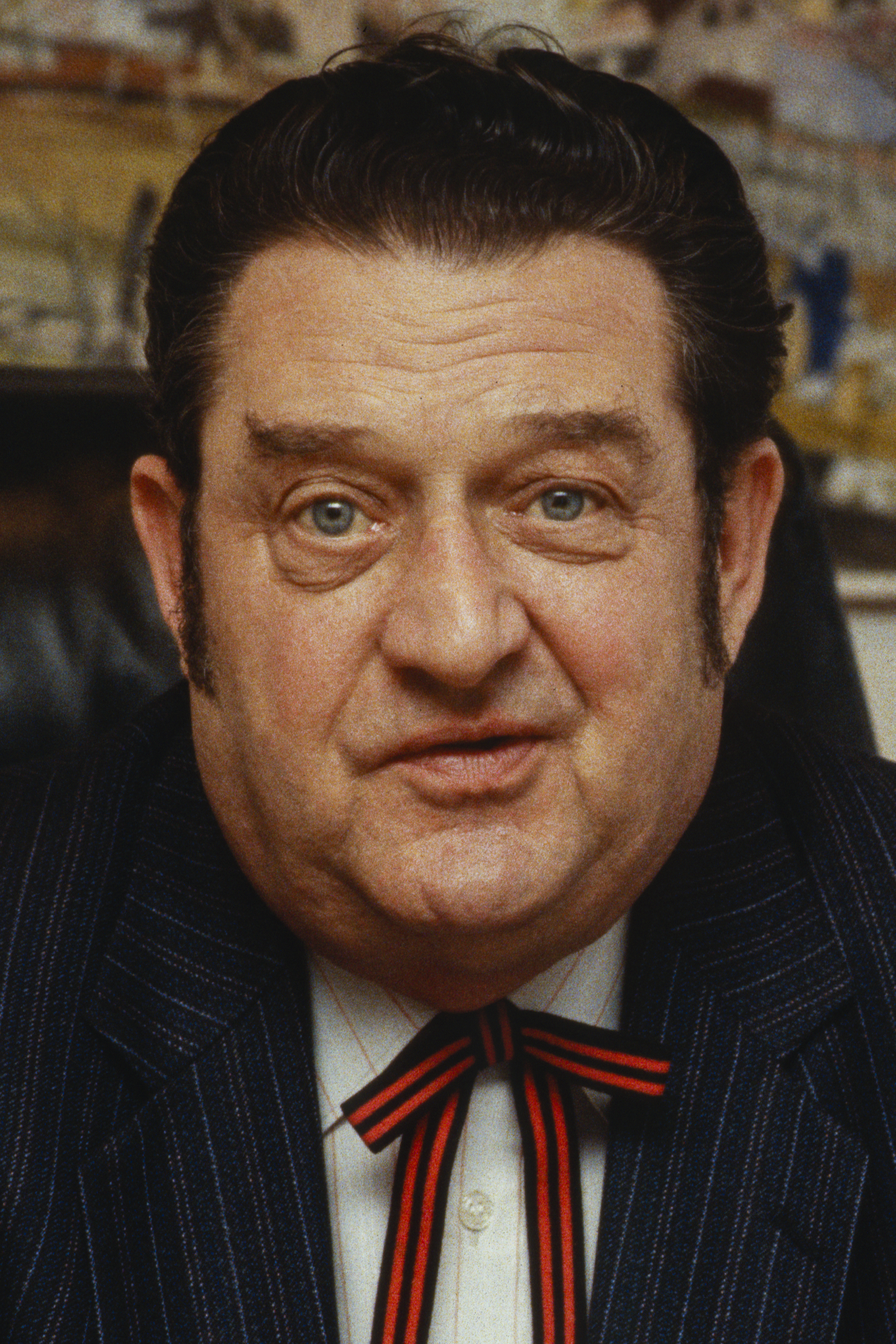
- Guido Nobel in 1985

Grand Councilor
- In office 1950–1975
- Parliamentary group: Socialist Group

President of the Grand Council
- In office 1968–1969
- Parliamentary group: Socialist Group

General Secretary of the Swiss Trade Union Federation
- In office October 1969 – 1970
- Preceded by: Jean Möri

Director General of Swiss Post
- In office April 1, 1975 – March 31, 1987
- Preceded by: Fritz Bourguin
- Succeeded by: Jean Clivaz

Personal details
- Born: September 16, 1922 Uzwil
- Died: March 8, 2002 (aged 79) Liestal
- Party: Social Democratic group
- Profession: Trade unionist; politician; business executive

Guido Nobel (1922–2002) was a Swiss trade unionist, politician, and business executive. State Councilor in Bern from 1950 to 1975 and president from 1968 to 1969, he was General Secretary of the Swiss Trade Union Federation and, from 1975 to 1987, Director General of the Swiss Post.

== Biography ==
=== Early life ===
Nobel was born in Uzwil on September 16, 1922, to Eugen Nobel, a freight service worker at the Swiss Federal Railways, and Karolina Lydia Noger. He studied in La Chaux-de-Fonds until 1937, when he moved to Bienne to undergo vocational training in mechanical watchmaking at Maeder-Leschot SA, until 1942. That same year he married Lydia Karolina Meyrat, with whom he had two daughters, Francine and Claudia. In the late 1940s and 1950s, after obtaining the federal qualification of suitability, he began his career in the state railways, first with an internship and then with the qualification of train conductor in 1952.

=== Trade unionist ===
In 1953 he began his trade union activity, elected regional secretary of the Swiss Federation of Trade, Transport and Food Workers (FCTA), a position he held for nine years, until 1962. From 1962 to 1969 he was central secretary of the Union-PTT of Romandy, as well as responsible for its related newspaper. In 1969 he reached the top of the trade union, becoming General Secretary of the Swiss Trade Union Federation, a position he held until 1970.

=== Head of the Swiss national postal service and its development ===
In that same year, he joined the board of directors of the National Post service (PTT), of which he became the general director in 1975, a position he held for twelve years, until 1987. During his tenure, he was responsible for the reorganization and modernization of the Swiss national postal service.

Under his direction, numerous innovations were introduced, including the inauguration of the first national mobile telephone network in 1975, initially dedicated to use on transportation, from which the name Natel (an acronym for "Nationales Autotelefonnetz") originated. The network was further expanded and modernized in 1978, 1983, and 1987, while in 1985, the first optical fiber cable was installed, connecting Bern to Neuchâtel. In 1977, the possibility of opening current accounts at post offices was introduced, and shortly after, the first Postomat (ATM) in the country was inaugurated in 1978. In 1982, barcodes were implemented for managing postal items, and a new national postal service logo, created by renowned typographer Adrian Frutiger, was introduced. In 1985, the PostFinance system for financial services was integrated, including current accounts and postal banking services, coinciding with the nationwide introduction of mandatory participation in the second pillar of the Swiss pension system. Also under Nobel's leadership, in the first half of 1986, the postal service began the national implementation of the internet ISDN network, which was inaugurated in 1988. In 1987, the videotex/teletext system was introduced. During his tenure, Nobel also received the "Grands Prix de l'Art Philatélique Européen" 1986 – a Sèvres porcelain cup – at the Salon Philatélique d'Automne in Paris, presented by the President of France François Mitterrand, in the presence of the French Minister of Post and Telecommunications Gérard Longuet.

=== Political activity ===
Parallel to his career as a public executive and trade unionist, Nobel also had a significant political career within the ranks of the Socialist Party.

From 1948 to 1956, he served as a municipal councilor in Biel, continuing his role as a non-permanent member until 1961. From 1950 to 1975, he was a State Councilor in Bern, and president from 1968 to 1969.

During his career, he was also president of the board of directors at Coop Suisse for eighteen years, and a member of the Swiss Metalworkers' and Watchmakers' Union (FTMH).

=== Other activities and later life ===
An expert in philately, and a melomaniac, he was also the president of the Association des fanfares in Biel and one of the founders of the Musique des Jeunes de Bienne (MJB).

In 1994, he published a memoir titled Une carrière au service de la communication, dedicated to his activities in the trade union and the national public communication sector.

After the death of his wife Lydia in 1983, he remarried in 1984 to executive and trade unionist Edith Rüfli (1931–2017), the first woman on the board of directors at Coop Suisse.

Nobel died on March 8, 2002, in Liestal, at the age of 79, due to heart failure.

== Books ==
- Guido Nobel (1994). Une carrière au service de la communication. Biel.
