= Michel Béguelin =

Swiss politician

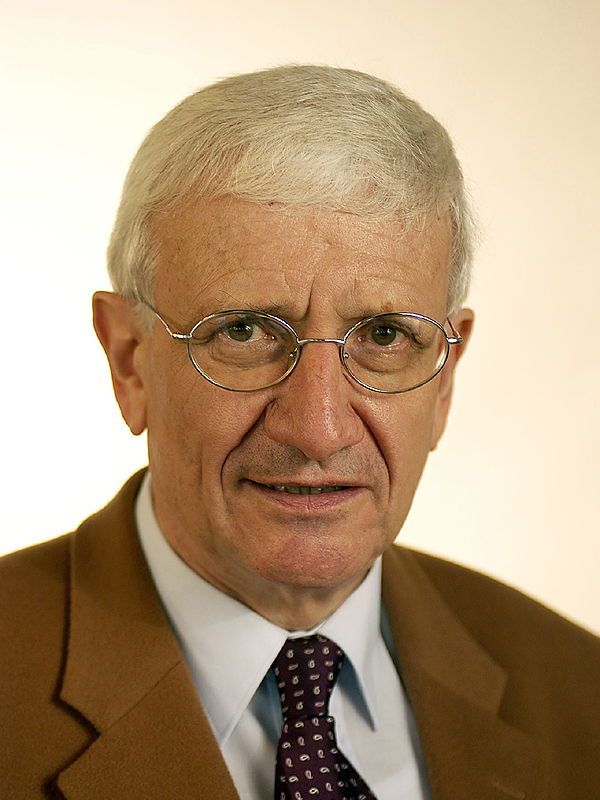
- Official portrait.

Member of the Council of States
- In office 6 December 1999 – 2 December 2007
- Preceded by: Eric Rochat
- Constituency: Vaud

Member of the National Council
- In office 30 November 1987 – 5 December 1999
- Constituency: Vaud

Personal details
- Born: 1 August 1936 (age 89) Boudry, Switzerland
- Party: Socialist Party
- Spouse: Marlyse Dormond Béguelin
- Occupation: Trade union secretary

Michel Béguelin (born 1 August 1936 in Boudry, Switzerland), is a Swiss politician and member of the Socialist Party. He served as a member of the National Council representing the canton of Vaud from 1987 to 1997, and in the Council of States from 1999 to 2007.

== Biography ==
Michel Béguelin was born in Boudry on 1 August 1936. He is originally from Tramelan (Canton of Bern). His father was an employee of the Swiss Federal Railways (CFF). After completing his education in Palézieux and Lausanne, he apprenticed as a station clerk. In 1976, he underwent training as a trade union secretary and became the secretary of the Union of Transport Workers (SEV) two years later. In 1980, he was appointed editor-in-chief of the union's journal, Cheminot.

In 1987, the Socialist Party nominated him for one of the three management positions at the Swiss national Post (PTT) to succeed his party colleague Guido Nobel, but his candidacy was not accepted by the PTT. At that time, the Radical, Christian Democratic, and Socialist parties traditionally each held one of these positions.

At the age of 32, he became president of the leisure center of the Lausanne Trade Union. He was also vice-president of the TGV Rhin-Rhône Association.

He is married to Socialist National Councillor Marlyse Dormond Béguelin.

== Political career ==
As a member of the Social Democratic Party of Switzerland, Michel Béguelin served on the executive committee from 1985 to 1991.

He did not hold any elected mandates at the municipal or cantonal levels before being elected to the National Council, where he represented the canton of Vaud from 1987 to 1999 · . In 1994 and 1995, he was president of the Commission for Transport and Telecommunications (CTT).

On 7 November 1999, he was elected to the Council of States in the second round of voting with 23 votes ahead of the outgoing Liberal Éric Rochat, thus joining the Radical Christiane Langenberger, elected in the first round. Due to the closeness of the result, a recount of the votes was conducted, but his election was confirmed. In 2002 and 2003, he served as president of the Commission for Management

In 2003, he became the first Socialist from Vaud to be elected to a second term in the Council of States, whereas Jacques Morier-Genoud and Yvette Jaggi had not succeeded in 1979 and 1995. He benefited from the division among the bourgeois parties, with four right-wing candidates in the second round against only one from the left. He was a State Councilor until 2007.

In the Federal Chambers, he was involved in issues related to railways and public transport.
