= Schweizer Musikzeitung =

Swiss classical music magazine

the Schweizer Musikzeitung

The Schweizer Musikzeitung (SMZ) is a monthly (9 times a year) music magazine from Brunnen. It is published in German, French and sporadically in Italian and reaches a circulation of 19,484 copies and a reach of 24,000 readers. Editor-in-chief is Katrin Spelinova-Bösch.

== History ==
In 1861, the Schweizerisches Sängerblatt was created from the kantonalbernisches Sängerblatt; in the same year, the Schweizer Gesang- und Musiklehrerverein (today Swiss Music Pedagogic Association) launched the journal Der Volksgesang, which was added to the SMZ from 1906. From 1879, the Sängerblatt was published as the Schweizerische Musikzeitung und Sängerblatt and was split off in 1937 for the Schweizerische Chorvereinigung; the Schweizerische Musikzeitung was henceforth published in German and French (as Revue Musicale Suisse).

In 1983, the old SMZ was discontinued after the withdrawal of the Schweizerischer Tonkünstlerverein and the Schweizer musikpädagogische Blätter of the SMPV (French Cahiers suisse de pédagogie musicale) were reactivated. It was not until 1997 that the merger of the previous association journals of SMPV, VMS (VMS-Bulletin/Animato since 1977), SMV (Schweizer Musikerblatt since 1914), EOV (Das Orchester since 1934) and JMS was decided and – "despite objections from the Tonkünstlerverein" – republished from 1998 as Schweizer Musikzeitung.

Until 31 December 2014, the Schweizer Musikzeitung association, based in Brunnen, published the Schweizer Musikzeitung. After that, the association was liquidated and the newspaper was published by NZZ Fachmedien AG. Since 1 October 2018 it is published by CH Media, a joint venture of the NZZ Mediengruppe and the AZ Medien on CH Media.

The Schweizer Musikzeitung publishes interdisciplinary articles from a musical perspective on topics from culture, pedagogy and culture and education policy. In addition to specialist articles, interviews and reports, the newspaper prints reviews of specialist literature, music supplies, DVDs and CDs and publishes a job advertiser for music professions.

For the daily news on the web platform, the Schweizer Musikzeitung cooperates with the online magazine Codex Flores.

The Schweizer Musikzeitung is the official organ of the following music associations:

- Eidgenössischer Orchesterverband (EOV)
- Konferenz Musikhochschulen Schweiz (KMHS)
- Kalaidos Musikhochschule
- Schweizer Musikrat (SMR) and IG CHorama
- Schweizerische Gesellschaft für Musik-Medizin (SMM)
- Schweizerische Musikforschende Gesellschaft (SMG)
- Swiss Musicians' Union (SMV)
- Swiss Music Pedagogic Association (SMPV)
- Stiftung Schweizerischer Jugendmusikwettbewerb (SJMW) and Arosa Kultur
- Verband Musikschulen Schweiz (VMS)

Another partner is the SUISA – Cooperative Society of Authors and Publishers of Music
