= Confederation of Swiss Employees' Associations =

The Confederation of Swiss Employees' Associations (German: Vereinigung Schweizerischer Angestelltenverbände, VSA; French: Fédération des Sociétés suisses d'Employés) was a national trade union federation bringing together unions representing non-manual workers in Switzerland.

== History ==
The federation was established in 1918 by most of the country's trade unions for non-manual workers. These included the Swiss Craftsmen's Association, the Union Helvetia, and the Swiss Association of Technicians, but more than half the membership came from the Swiss Commercial Association. The new federation remained riven with disputes, with many of the smaller affiliates wanting to merge into a single union, but the large affiliates preferring to retain their independence. The Technicians resigned in 1922, and in 1935 a dispute over co-operation between the VSA and the Swiss Trade Union Federation led the Association of Swiss Employees' Associations of the Machine Industry to resign.

Despite the disputes, membership of the federation trended up, from 60,000 in 1940, to peak at 148,734 in 1985. In the 1960s, it began admitting unions representing any workers. However, from the late-1980s, it began losing members, and was down to 120,950 in seven unions by 1997. In 2000, the Swiss Commercial Association resigned, leaving the VSA much weakened. In 2002, it merged with the Christian National Union Confederation, to form Travail.Suisse.

== Affiliates ==
Union	Abbreviation	Founded	Left	Reason not affiliated	Membership (1954)	Membership (1997)
Association of Employees of the Swiss Book Trade	ASB	1883	1984	Resigned		
Swiss Association of Commercial Travelers		1925	1980		1,048	N/A
Swiss Association of Insurance Inspectors and Agents	SVVIA		2002	Transferred to Travail.Suisse	N/A	
Swiss Association of Management Consultants	SVBF	1946	1969		N/A	N/A
Swiss Association of Pharmaceutical Personnel		1940	2002	Transferred to Travail.Suisse	355	
Swiss Association of Surveyors		1929			500	
Swiss Association of Technicians	STV	1905	1922	Resigned		
Swiss Bank Employees' Union	SBPV	1918	1943	Resigned	10,700	19,183
Swiss Commercial Association	SKV	1873	2000	Resigned	55,700	63,770
Swiss Construction Management Association	SBKV	1905	1990		1,593	N/A
Swiss Laboratory Staff Association	SLV	1946	2002	Transferred to Travail.Suisse	N/A	N/A
Swiss Management Organisation	SKO	1893	2002	Became independent	10,329	8,669
Swiss Musicians' Union	SMV	1914	1990s	Transferred to SGB	1,104	
Union Helvetia	UH	1886	2002	Transferred to Travail.Suisse	9,395	17,728
United Swiss Staff Associations in the Machine and Electrical Industries	VSAM	1919	2002	Transferred to Travail.Suisse	7,112	18,556
