= Christian National Union Confederation =

Swiss trade union federation

The Christian National Union Confederation (German: Christlichnationaler Gewerkschaftsbund der Schweiz, CNG; French: Confédération des syndicats chrétiens de Suisse) was a trade union federation bringing together Christian democratic trade unions in Switzerland.

== History ==
The federation was founded in 1907, as the Christian Social Union Federation of Switzerland, with about 4,500 members. After almost collapsing, it began co-operating with the Swiss Trade Union Federation during World War I, but withdrew this in 1918 due to it opposition to the possibility of a general strike. It spread into Romandy from 1916, and Ticino from 1918. In 1921, it renamed itself as the CNG, and grew steadily, reaching 36,000 members by 1941, 84,000 in 1961, and peaking at 116,000 in 1990. While the federation was open to all Christians, the vast majority of members were Catholics, with some Protestants instead forming the Swiss Federation of Protestant Trade Unions.

During the 1990s, the federation's affiliates rapidly lost members, and by 1997, it was down to 93,100. In 2002, it merged with the Confederation of Swiss Employees' Associations, to form Travail.Suisse.

== Affiliates ==
Union	Abbreviation	Founded	Left	Reason not affiliated	Membership (1963)	Membership (1989)
Christian Agricultural Workers' Union of Switzerland	CLB	1951	1988	Dissolved	794	N/A
Christian Chemical, Textile, Clothing, Paper and Staff Union	CTB	1904	1994	Merged into CMV	10,315	6,644
Christian Metalworkers' Union of Switzerland	CMV	1905	1998	Merged into Syna	28,797	23,896
Christian Transport, Commerce and Food Workers' Union	CTHL	1908	1992	Merged into CMV	4,757	2,500
Christian Union of Transport, Military and Customs	GCV	1919	2000	Merged into Transfair	6,150	7,509
Christian Wood and Construction Workers' Union of Switzerland	CHB	1901	1998	Merged into Syna	29,160	47,039
Swiss Federation of Protestant Trade Unions	SVEA	1920	1993	Merged into CMV	13,840	3,604
Swiss Graphical Union	SGG	1965	1998	Merged into Syna	N/A	4,286
Swiss Printers' Union	SBG	1908	1965	Merged into SGG	1,763	N/A
Swiss Union of Christian Bookbinders, Paper and Cardboard Workers and Graphical Assistants	SVCB	1908	1965	Merged into SGG	512	N/A
Swiss Union of Christian Postal, Telephone and Telegraph Personnel	ChPTT	1923	2000	Merged into Transfair	6,036	9,887
Syna	Syna	1998	2002	Transferred to Travail.Suisse	N/A	N/A
Transfair	Transfair	2000	2002	Transferred to Travail.Suisse	N/A	N/A
Union of Christian Employees of Switzerland		1934			2,344	N/A
Union of Christian Government Personnel	VCB	1929	2000	Merged into Transfair	453	1,133
Union of Christian State and Municipal Personnel of Switzerland	VHCP	1922	1999	Merged into Syna	2,078	2,717
Union of Czech and Slovak Christian Workers in Switzerland			2002	Transferred to Travail.Suisse	N/A	150
Union of Hungarian Christian Workers in Switzerland	VUCAS	1959	2002	Transferred to Travail.Suisse	238	787
