= Swiss Woodworkers' Union =

The Swiss Woodworkers' Union (German: Schweizerische Holzarbeiter-Verband, SHAV) was a trade union representing carpenters and those in related trades in Switzerland.

The union was founded in 1886, and was an early affiliate of the Swiss Trade Union Federation. In 1902, it was joined by the Romandy Federation of Joiners, Cabinetmakers, Carpenters and Parqueters, and in 1908 by the Glaziers' Union. The union was considered to be the leading force on the left wing of the Swiss trade union movement, and it led successful strikes in support of a maximum 48-hour working week in 1919.

From 1919, the union was led by Johann Halmer. In 1922, it merged with the Swiss Construction Workers' Union, to form the Swiss Construction and Woodworkers' Union.
