= Adolphe Graedel =

Swiss trade union leader and politician

Adolphe Graedel (seated) is greeted welcome to Swedish Trade Union Confederation's congress by the chairman Åke Nilsson, 1965.

Adolphe Graedel (26 September 1902 – 14 November 1980) was a Swiss trade union leader and politician.

Born in Sonvilier, Graedel completed an apprenticeship as a case maker, then studied at the labour movement college in Brussels. He returned to La Chaux-de-Fonds, joining the Workers' Union, and in 1934 won election as its president. In 1938, he additionally became the editor of La Sentinelle, the newspaper of the Social Democratic Party of Switzerland.

In 1943, Graedel joined the Swiss Metalworkers' and Watchmakers' Union (SMUV), and in 1945 became its general secretary. In 1951, he was elected to the National Council. In 1954, he became general secretary of the International Metalworkers' Federation, from 1955 until 1961 combining it with the vice-presidency of the SMUV. He retired in 1970, and died ten years later.

Trade union offices
Preceded by Konrad Ilg	General Secretary of the International Metalworkers' Federation; 1954–1970	Succeeded by Ivar Noren
