= Swiss Union of Mass Media =

Trade union representing workers in Switzerland

The Swiss Union of Mass Media (German: Schweizer Syndikat Medienschaffender, SSM; French: Syndicat Suisse des Mass Media) is a trade union representing workers in broadcasting and electronic media in Switzerland.

The union was founded in 1974, largely by former members of the Association of Employees of Swiss Television. By 1975, it had 1,100 members, most of whom worked for the Swiss Broadcasting Corporation. Over time, it increasingly also represented workers in private radio and television stations, and the Swiss Telegraphic Agency.

In 1994, the union attempted to negotiate a merger with its main rival, the Association of Swiss Radio and Televisions Employees (VSRTA). Although the talks collapsed, many members from the VSRTA decided to transfer. The VRSTA dissolved in 2000, and encouraged its remaining members to transfer to the SSM.

In 1998, the union planned to merge into Comedia, but its members in Romandy opposed the idea, and the SSM instead remained independent. By 2000, it had 3,536 members, although this fell to 3,000 in 2017. It is affiliated to the Swiss Trade Union Federation.
