= Ernst Leuenberger (printing trade unionist) =

Swiss trade union leader

Ernst Leuenberger (30 August 1900 – 28 July 1986) was a Swiss trade union leader.

Born in Bözingen, Leuenberger completed an apprenticeship as a typesetter. In 1920, he found work in Biel/Bienne, and also joined the Swiss Typographers' Union (STB). He became a part-time secretary for the union in 1932, then in 1935 moved to St Gallen to become its full-time vice president. In 1939, he was elected as full-time central secretary of the union, based in Bern.

Leuenberger focused on increasing the pay and conditions of the union's members, while avoiding industrial action. In 1955, he additionally became vice president of the International Graphical Federation, then became its president in 1958. He retired from the union in 1965, and from his international post in 1967. He also served as president of the Swiss Travel Fund, and on the board of the Swiss National Bank.

Trade union offices
Preceded by Friedrich Segessenmann	President of the International Graphical Federation; 1958–1967	Succeeded by John Bonfield
