= Gottfried Reimann =

Swiss politician and trade union leader

Gottfried Reimann (5 October 1862 – 23 February 1909) was a Swiss politician and trade union leader.

Born in Biel/Bienne, Reimann completed an apprenticeship as a typographer. He then spent time working in Geneva, Strasbourg and Vevey, becoming bilingual in French and German. In 1886, he founded the newspaper L'Ouvrier horloger in Biel, and became active in the Swiss Typographers' Union.

In 1892, the International Printers' Secretariat was established in Bern, and the following year, Reimann was elected as its first general secretary. He also joined the Grütli Union, and in 1894 was elected to the Grand Council of Bern. In 1896, he moved to work for the Swiss Workers' Secretariat. In 1901, Grütli Union joined the Social Democratic Party of Switzerland, and from 1902 to 1908 he served as its president.

From 1899, Reimann served on the Biel/Bienne municipal council, and in 1907 he was elected as mayor of the city, the first socialist to serve as a mayor in Switzerland.

Trade union offices
Preceded by New position	General Secretary of the International Printers' Secretariat; 1893–1896	Succeeded by Friedrich Siebenmann
Party political offices
Preceded by Joseph Albisser	President of the Social Democratic Party of Switzerland; 1902–1908	Succeeded by Eduard Kessler
Political offices
Preceded by Eduard Stauffer	Mayor of Biel/Bienne; 1907–1909	Succeeded by Louis Leuenberger
