= National Association of Free Swiss Employees =

The National Association of Free Swiss Employees (German: Landesverband Freier Schweizer Arbeitnehmer, LFSA; French: Union suisse des syndicats autonomes) was a general union representing workers in Switzerland.

The union was established on 11 May 1919 by workers who identified with the liberal movement. Initially based in St Gallen, it relocated to Zürich in 1941. This move led it to gain members, reaching 10,000 in 1943, and 20,000 in 1974. In 1950, it led the foundation of the World Union of Liberal Trade Union Organizations.

The union was much smaller than the Swiss Trade Union Federation (SGB), and was promoted as an alternative to it by some employers. It was a party to several major collective agreements, along with the SGB. Membership peaked at 23,000 in 1983, and then began to fall. By 1997, it had 17,015 members, of whom 17% worked in the metal industry, 15% in construction, 10% in primary industries, 7% in textiles and clothing, and the remainder across a wide range of industries.

In 1998, the union merged with the Christian Wood and Construction Workers' Union of Switzerland, the Christian Union for Industry, Trade and Commerce and the Swiss Graphic Trade Union, to form Syna.
