= Union of Swiss Telegraph and Telephone Supervisors =

The Union of Swiss Telegraph and Telephone Supervisors (German: Verband schweizerischer Telegraphen- und Telephonbeamter, VSTTB; French: Association suisse des fonctionnaires des télégraphes et téléphones) was a trade union representing telecommunication workers in Switzerland.

The union was founded in 1874, as the Swiss Telegraphists' Association, the first permanent trade union in the Swiss public sector. It affiliated to the General Association of Federal Civil Servants and Employees in 1898, but left again in 1902. In 1910, it began admitting women, and in 1912, it adopted its final name. By 1954, the union had affiliated to the Swiss Trade Union Federation, and had 2,528 members.

In 1998, the VSTTB merged with the Union of Swiss Postal, Telegraph and Telephone Personnel, the Union of Swiss Postal Employees, the Association of Swiss Air Traffic Control Personnel, the Post Office Keepers' Association and the postal section of the Staff Association of the Federal Administration, to form the Union of Communication.
