= Swiss Federation of Protestant Trade Unions =

General union in Switzerland

The Swiss Federation of Protestant Trade Unions (German: Schweizerischer Verband evangelischer Arbeitnehmer, SVEA) was a general union in Switzerland.

In 1907, about 300 Protestant workers established the Swiss Evangelical Social Support Fund, to provide financial support during future labour disputes. This proved valuable during the 1918 Swiss general strike, following which its membership rose to 2,000. In 1920, it was refounded as a general union, in opposition to the social democratic Swiss Trade Union Federation. In 1928, it was a founding affiliate of the International Federation of Workmen's Evangelical Associations. The federation's membership rose steadily until 1951, when it peaked at 16,890.

In 1982, the union affiliated to the Christian National Union Confederation. However, it was in rapid decline; by 1992, it was down to just 2,430 members. The following year, it merged into the Christian Union for Industry, Trade and Commerce.
