= Ernst Leuenberger =

Swiss trade unionist and politician

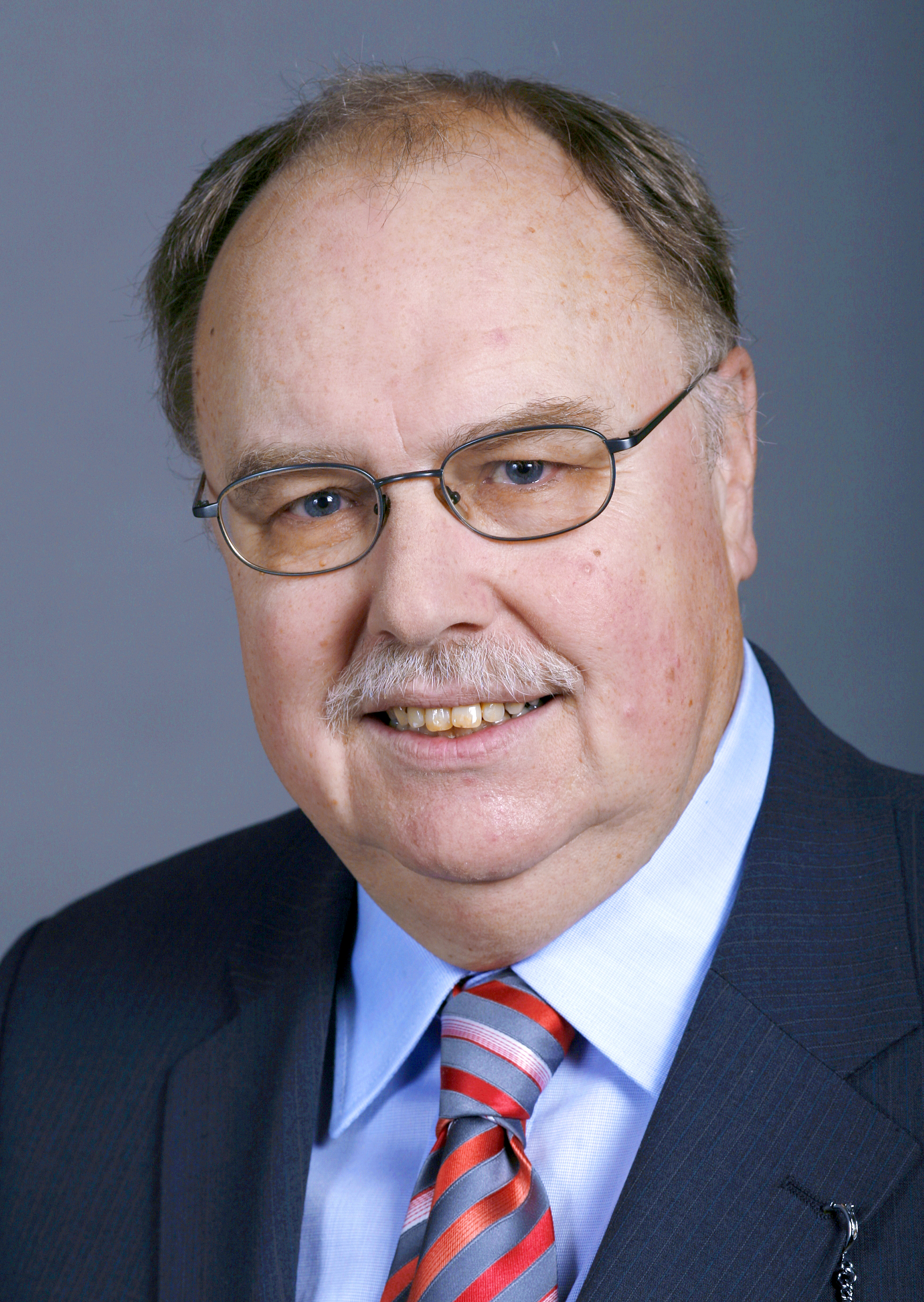

Member of the National Council of Switzerland
- In office 28 November 1983 – 5 December 1999

Member of the Council of States
- In office 6 December 1999 – 30 June 2009

President of the National Council of Switzerland
- In office 1 December 1997 – 29 November 1998

Personal details
- Born: Ernst Leuenberger; 18 January 1945; Krälingen, Switzerland
- Died: 30 June 2009 (aged 64)
- Political party: Social Democratic Party of Switzerland

Ernst Leuenberger (18 January 1945 – 30 June 2009) was a Swiss trade unionist and politician. He was a member of the National Council from 1983 to 1999, serving as president of the council in 1998, and a member of the Council of States from 1999 to 2009. He was a member of the Social Democratic Party of Switzerland.

== Biography ==
Leuenberger was born in Kräilingen, a settlement near Bätterkinden in the Canton of Bern and was raised in Solothurn. He studied economics and social science at the University of Bern. In Bern, he also became active politically and organized anti-Vietnam War protests. He became friends with Willi Ritschard, a member of the Federal Council, who encouraged him to seek the position of secretary of the Confederation of Trade Unions for the Canton of Solothurn in 1973.

In 1983, he was elected to the National Council for Solothurn. While serving at the national level, he remained active in the labor movement and, in 1990, ran for the presidency of the Swiss Trade Union Federation against Walter Renschler, but was defeated. In 1992, he sought a seat on the cantonal Executive Council in Solothurn, but also failed in that bid. He was asked to run for a seat on the Federal Council in 1995 to replace Otto Stich, but declined.

In 1997, while serving as Vice President of the National Council, he was elected as the President of the Union of Transport Workers, which he held until 2005. Later that year, he assumed the presidency of the National Council. In 1999, Leuenberger won a seat in the Council of States.

He stepped down as head of the transport workers union in 2005 in order to focus on his work at the federal level.

Leuenberger died on 30 June 2009 of cancer from which he had suffered since 2005.
