= Union of Swiss Postal Employees =

Former trade union representing office staff of Swiss Post

- (German: Verband Schweizerischer Postbeamten, VSPB; French: Société suisse des fonctionnaires postaux)
- Formation: 2 July 1893
- Type: Trade Union
- Location: Switzerland
- Affiliations: Swiss Post

The Union of Swiss Postal Employees (German: Verband Schweizerischer Postbeamten, VSPB; French: Société suisse des fonctionnaires postaux) was a trade union representing office staff of Swiss Post.

The union was founded on 2 July 1893, with the merger of local unions based in Bern, Geneva, Neuchâtel, St Gallen and Zurich. In 1915, the Union of Swiss Graduate Post Office Officials merged in. By 1954, the union had affiliated to the Swiss Trade Union Federation and had 5,501 members.

In 1998, the VSPB merged with the Union of Swiss Postal, Telegraph and Telephone Personnel, the Union of Swiss Telegraph and Telephone Supervisors, the Association of Swiss Air Traffic Control Personnel, the Post Office Keepers' Association and the postal section of the Staff Association of the Federal Administration, to form the Union of Communication.
