= Bratschi =

Bratschi is a surname. Notable people with the surname include:

- Fred Bratschi (1892–1962), American baseball player
- Noah Bratschi (born 2000), American rock climber
- Robert Bratschi (1891–1981), Swiss politician and trade unionist
