= Swiss Construction Workers' Union =

Former trade union in Switzerland

The Swiss Construction Workers' Union (German: Schweizerische Bauarbeiterverband, SBAV) was a trade union representing workers in the construction industry in Switzerland.

Although many of the various small unions of building workers in Switzerland were affiliated to the Swiss Trade Union Federation, the stronger unions were concerned about allying with the weaker ones, and they could not agree on the best way to unionise Italian workers in the industry. The SBAV was founded in 1904, but remained very small.

In 1920, the SBAV was joined by the Stone and Clay Workers' Union merged with the Central Union of Carvers, the Central Union of Painters and Plasterers, and the Union of Bricklayers and Labourers. Augusto Vuattolo, former leader of the bricklayers, became the president of the SBAV. Two years later, it merged with the Swiss Woodworkers' Union to form the Swiss Construction and Woodworkers' Union.
