= SMPA =

SMPA may refer to:

- the George Washington University School of Media and Public Affairs
- the Seoul Metropolitan Police Agency
- the Swedish Magazine Publishers Association
- Swiss Music Pedagogic Association
- Vincent Fayks Airport ICAO code
