= Union of Swiss Postal, Telegraph and Telephone Personnel =

Swiss trade union

The Union of Swiss Postal, Telegraph and Telephone Personnel (German: Verband Schweizerischer Post-, Telephon- und Telegraphenangestellter, French: Fédération suisse des employés des postes, téléphones et télégraphes, PTT-Union) was a trade union representing communication workers in Switzerland.

The union was founded on 5 April 1891 in Zurich, as the Union of Federal Post, Telegraph and Customs Clerks. The Union of Swiss Customs Clerks split away in 1919, and it renamed itself as the Union of Swiss Post and Telegraph Employees. In 1928, affiliated to the Swiss Trade Union Federation, and it also absorbed the Union of Federal Telephone and Telegraph Workers.

By 1954, the union had adopted its final name, and had 16,191 members, the lower-paid, uniformed employees of the communications sector. By 1997, its membership had grown to 28,360. The following year, it merged with the Union of Swiss Postal Employees, the Union of Swiss Telegraph and Telephone Supervisors, the Association of Swiss Air Traffic Control Personnel, the Post Office Keepers' Association and the postal section of the Staff Association of the Federal Administration, to form the Union of Communication.
