= Garanto =

Garanto is a trade union representing customs officials and border guards in Switzerland.

The union was founded in 2001, when the Swiss Customs Employees' Union merged with the Union of Swiss Customs Officials. It affiliated to the Swiss Trade Union Federation. By 2017, it had 3,316 members.
