= Swiss Bank Employees' Union =

Swiss trade union

The Swiss Bank Employees' Union (German: Schweizerische Bankpersonalverband, SBPV; French: Association suisse des employés de banque) is a trade union representing workers in the banking industry in Switzerland.

The union was founded in April 1918, by eight local organisations which had split from the Swiss Commercial Association. It initially had 3,500 members, but grew steadily, reaching 5,304 members in 1920, 10,700 in 1950, and 26,306 in 1975.

In 1920, the union concluded its first collective agreement, with the Association of Zurich Credit Institutions, and it also created an employment agency for members. In 1931, it started an unemployment fund, followed in 1940 by a general aid fund. From its foundation, it was affiliated to the Confederation of Swiss Employees' Associations, but it left in 1943. It remained independent until 2001, when it became an associate member of the Swiss Trade Union Federation, later becoming a full member. However, by this point, its membership was in steady decline, and by 2007, it was down to 7,919.
