= Federal Assembly (Switzerland) =

Bicameral legislature of Switzerland

Federal Assembly: Bundesversammlung (German); Assemblée fédérale (French); Assemblea federale (Italian); Assamblea federala (Romansh)

Type
- Type: Bicameral
- Houses: Council of States; National Council

Leadership
- President of the National Council: Pierre-André Page, SVP/UDC
- President of the Council of States: Stefan Engler, The Centre

Structure
- Seats: 246; 46 Council of States; 200 National Council
- National Council political groups: SVP/UDC 62 SP/PS 41 The Centre 29 FDP/PLR 28 Greens 23 GLP/PVL 10 EvP/PEV 2 EDU/UDF 2 MCG 2 LT 1
- Council of States political groups: The Centre 15 FDP/PLR 11 SP/PS 9 SVP/UDC 6 Greens 3 GLP/PVL 1 MCG 1

Elections
- Last National Council election: 22 October 2023
- Last Council of States election: October–November 2023

Meeting place
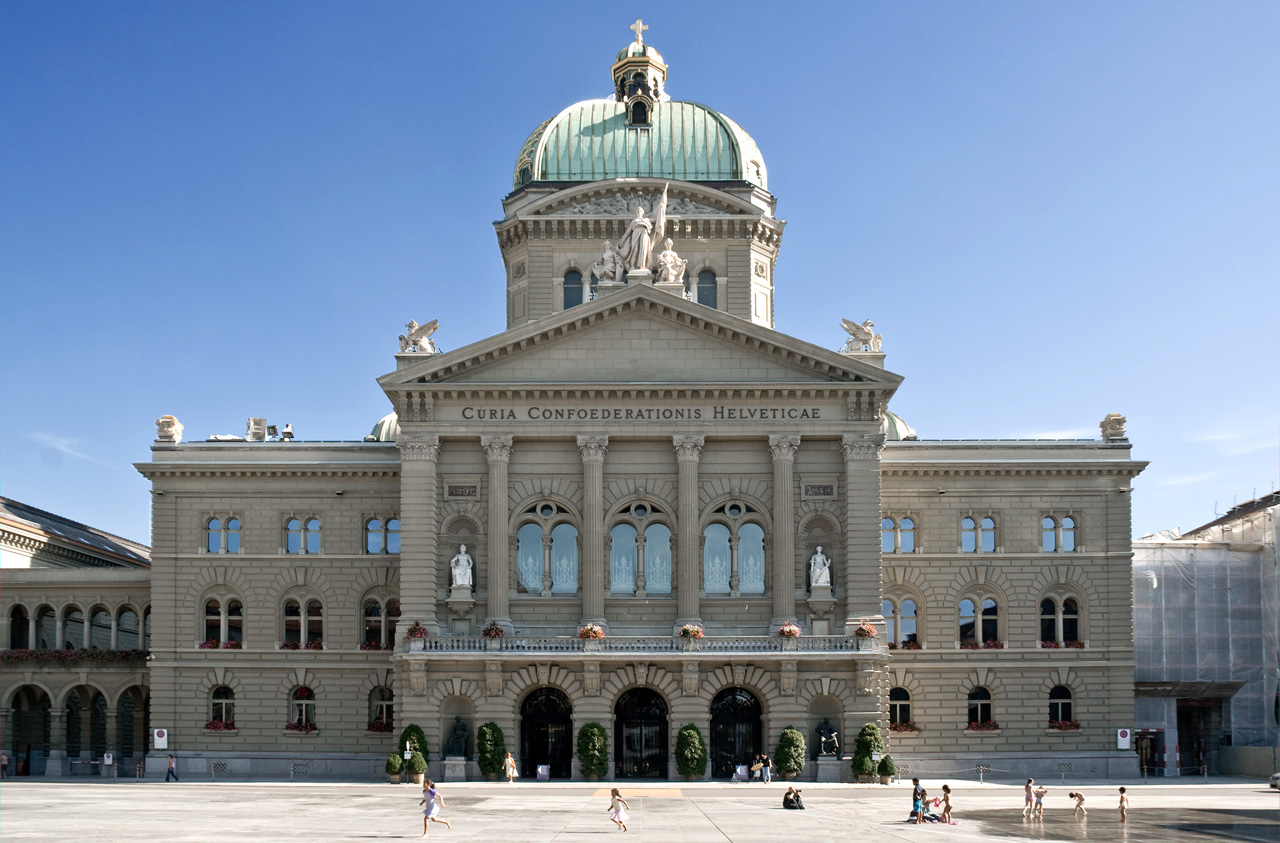
- Federal Palace of Switzerland, Bern

Website
- www.parliament.ch

The Federal Assembly, also known as the Swiss Parliament, is the federal bicameral parliament of Switzerland. It comprises the 200-seat National Council and the 46-seat Council of States. It meets in Bern in the Federal Palace.

The houses have identical powers. Members of both houses represent the cantons, but, whereas seats in the National Council are distributed in proportion to population, each canton has two seats in the Council of States, except the six 'half-cantons', which have one seat each. Both are elected in full once every four years, with the last election being held in 2023.

The Federal Assembly possesses the federal government's legislative power, along with the separate constitutional right of citizen's initiative. For a law to pass, it must be passed by both houses. The two houses may come together as a United Federal Assembly in certain circumstances, such as to elect the Federal Council (the head of government and state), the Federal Chancellor, the federal judges or (only in times of great national danger) a general.

== History ==
Prior to the establishment of the federal state in 1848, the only central organ of Switzerland was the Federal Diet (Tagsatzung). Following the Sonderbund War in 1847, the Tagsatzung became responsible for drawing up the Swiss Federal Constitution.

The process of formulating legislative power resulted in clashing opinions, in particular in relation to the representation of the various cantons: the radicals, in the majority in the largest cantons, pushed for a system where representation was purely proportional to the population of each township; the small cantons, for their part, feared being marginalized. After long debates, a compromise was found by adopting the American model of bicameralism; the parliament will be composed of two chambers with equal power, and the agreement of both will be required to take a decision. The National Council, which represents the people, will comprise representatives from each canton with their distribution being proportional to the population of the cantons, while the Council of States, which represents the cantons, will be composed of the same number of representatives from each canton. According to the Constitution of 1848, the Federal Assembly is "the supreme authority of the Confederation".

The Tagsatzung accepted the draft constitution in June 1848. On September 12, following the vote of the various cantons, it noted that the Constitution had been approved and dissolved itself on September 22, as required by the transitional provisions of the approved text. During the month of October 1848, elections were organized in the cantons in order to elect the deputies. After a few skirmishes, particularly in the canton of Fribourg, the results were announced which confirmed the victory of the radicals, who won more than three-quarters of the seats in the National Council and 30 of the 44 seats in the Council of States. On, November 16, 1848, Parliament elected the first Federal Council. In 1874, following the revision of the Constitution and the introduction of extended popular rights, the Federal Assembly became "the supreme authority of the Confederation subject to the rights of the people and the cantons".

The organization of the two councils has changed little over time. When the National Council was created, the total number of seats was 111. This number was not fixed and evolved in proportion to the growth of the Swiss population until 1962 when the definitive number of seats was established at 200; the term of office, meanwhile, was increased from the original three years to four years in 1931. The mode of election, originally according to the majority system, transitioned to proportional representation in 1918. The Council of States, meanwhile, was not modified until 1979, by adding two new seats for the Canton of Jura which had just been created.

== Composition ==
The Federal Assembly is made up of two chambers:

- the National Council, with 200 seats; and
- the Council of States, with 46 councillors.

Seats in the National Council are allocated to the cantons proportionally, based on population. In the Council of States, every canton has two seats (except for the former "half-cantons", which have one seat each).

=== United Federal Assembly ===
On occasions the two houses sit jointly as the "United Federal Assembly" (German: Vereinigte Bundesversammlung; French: Assemblée fédérale, Chambres réunies; Italian: Assemblea federale plenaria; Romansh: Assamblea federala plenara). This is done to:

- elect members of the Federal Council, the Federal Chancellor, the federal judges or (only in times of great national danger) a general
- arbitrate in the event of conflicts between federal authorities;
- issue pardons; or
- listen to special announcements

The United Federal Assembly is presided by the National Council's presidency.

The Federal Assembly also confirms the appointment of the Federal Data Protection and Information Commissioner (appointed by the Federal Council).

== Groups ==
Parties can cooperate in parliamentary groups, also called political groups, allowing smaller parties access to rights as part of a caucus. At least five members from the same Council are needed to form a group. Only informal groups exist in the Council of States. Members of the National Council are required to be in a formal group in order to be able to sit on a committee.

Since March 2009, there have been six groups in the Federal Assembly. The latest group to form was the Conservative Democratic Party which split off the Swiss People's Party in 2008. The Christian Democrats/EPP/glp Group (CEg) was formed after the 2007 elections, out of the former Christian Democratic (C) and EPP (E) groups. The current FTP/Liberal group (RL) was formed in 2003 out of the former FDP (R) and Liberal (L) groups; since the 2009 fusion of the Free Democratic and Liberal Parties, RL is once again a single-party group. In 2011, the CEg was disbanded, the Green Liberals formed their own parliamentary group (GL) and the three Christian parties formed the Christian-Evangelical Group (CE).

=== 51st legislature (2019–2023) ===
Currently (for the legislative period of 2019–2023), the six parliamentary groups are composed as follows:

Group	Parties	NC	CS	Total
People's parliamentary group (V)	Swiss People's Party	53	6	62
People's parliamentary group (V)	Ticino League	1	0	62
People's parliamentary group (V)	Federal Democratic Union	1	0	62
People's parliamentary group (V)	Independent	0	1	62
Social Democrats parliamentary group (S)	Social Democratic Party	39	8	47
Centre parliamentary group CVP-EVP-BDP (M-CEB)	Christian Democratic People's Party	25	14	45
Centre parliamentary group CVP-EVP-BDP (M-CEB)	Conservative Democratic Party	3	0	45
Centre parliamentary group CVP-EVP-BDP (M-CEB)	Evangelical People's Party	3	0	45
FDP.The Liberals parliamentary group (RL)	FDP.The Liberals	29	12	41
Green parliamentary group (G)	Green Party	28	5	35
Green parliamentary group (G)	Swiss Party of Labour	1	0	35
Green parliamentary group (G)	Solidarity	1	0	35
Green Liberal parliamentary group (GL)	Green Liberal Party	16	0	16

=== 50th legislature (2015–2019) ===
After the 2015 federal election, the Federal Assembly was composed of 7 groups:

Group		Parties	NC	CS	Total	President
V	Swiss People's Party group Fraktion der Schweizerischen Volkspartei; Groupe de l'Union Démocratique du Centre	SVP/UDC (69), Lega (2), MCR (1), Ind. (2)	68	6	74	Thomas Aeschi
S	Social Democratic group Sozialdemokratische fraction Groupe socialiste	SP/PS	42	12	54	Roger Nordmann
RL	FDP-Liberal-Radical group FDP-Liberale fraktion Groupe Libéral-Radical	FDP/PLR	33	12	45	Beat Walti
C	CVP group CVP-fraktion; Groupe PDC	CVP/PDC (40), EVP/PEV (2), CSP OW (1)	29	14	43	Filippo Lombardi
G	Greens group Grüne fraktion Groupe des Verts	Greens (12), PdA/PST (1)	12	1	13	Balthasar Glättli
BD	BDP group BDP fraktion Groupe PBD	BDP/PBD	7	1	8	Rosmarie Quadranti
GL	Green-liberal group Grünliberale fraktion Groupe Vert'Libéral	GLP/PVL	8	0	8	Tiana Angelina Moser

	Groups							Vacant
	V	S	RL	C	G	BD	GL	Vacant
Opening	74	55	45	43	13	8	7	0
2019-05-29 (Note: National Councillor Daniel Frei leaves the SP and joins the GLP)	74	54	45	43	13	8	8	0
2019-06-03 (Note: National Councillor Daniel Fässler is elected to the Council of States and remains in the C group, but the canton of Appenzell-Innerhoden decides to not fill his National Council seat which is left vacant until the federal election)	74	54	45	42	13	8	8	1

== See also ==
- 2023 Swiss federal election
- 2019 Swiss federal election
- 2015 Swiss federal election
- 2011 Swiss federal election
- 2007 Swiss federal election
- Hotel Bellevue Palace
- Federal Diet of Switzerland
- Parliament Act (Switzerland)
- Political Institutions Committee

== Bibliography ==
- Federal Chancellor Corina Casanova, ed. (28 April 2015), The Swiss Confederation – A Brief Guide 2015, Berne, Switzerland: Swiss Federal Chancellery FCh of the Swiss Confederation, archived from the original (PDF) on 21 January 2016
