= Friedrich Segessenmann =

Friedrich Segessenmann (18 February 1897 – 20 February 1972) was a Swiss trade union leader and politician.

Born in Uttigen, Segessenmann completed an apprenticeship as a lithographer, and worked in various cities in Switzerland, then from 1924 until 1926 in Greece. He then returned to Switzerland, and became prominent in the Swiss Lithographers' Union (SLB). In 1934, he began working full-time for the union as its Bern district secretary, then in 1944, he became the union's central secretary. In 1955, he additionally became president of the International Graphical Federation.

Segessenmann was a member of the Social Democratic Party of Switzerland, and in 1936 he was elected as a city councillor in Bern. From 1938 until 1948, and again from 1954 to 1958, he was a member of the Grand Council of Bern, and in 1946/47 he served on the National Council. He retired from all his posts in 1958, due to poor health.

Trade union offices
Preceded by ?	Central Secretary of the Swiss Lithographers' Union; 1944–1958	Succeeded by Hermann Wirz
Preceded by Adolf Schäfer	President of the International Graphical Federation; 1955–1958	Succeeded by Ernst Leuenberger
