= Konrad Ilg =

Swiss trade unionist and politician (1877–1954)

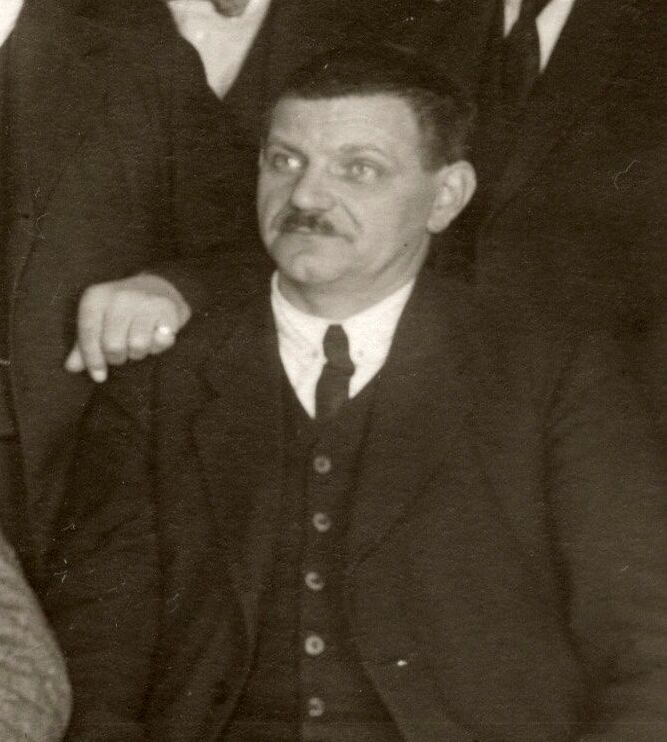
Konrad Ilg in 1921

Konrad Ilg (25 January 1877 – 12 August 1954) was a Swiss trade unionist and politician.

== History ==
Born in Ermatingen, Ilg completed an apprenticeship as a locksmith. He started his journeyman years in Zürich, where he joined the Zürich Locksmiths' Union, then in 1903 moved to Lausanne, becoming president of its local locksmiths' union in 1905, and successfully promoting the merger of the local metalworkers' unions into the Workers' Union, becoming its president in 1908. In this role, he led a major strike of construction workers.

In 1909, Ilg was elected as central secretary of the Swiss Metalworkers' Union in Bern. He championed its merger into the Swiss Metalworkers' and Watchmakers' Union in 1915, becoming its central president for Romandy, then in 1917 the union's central president. Now one of the leading figures in the Swiss workers' movement, he attended the founding congress of the International Labour Organization in 1919, becoming a board member in 1927, and then in 1937 became its vice-president for Switzerland. In 1921, Ilg was appointed as secretary of the International Metalworkers' Federation (IMF), serving until his death, in 1954.

== Politics ==
Influenced by Pierre-Joseph Proudhon, Charles Fourier and Jean Jaurès, Ilg was active in the Grütli Union in his youth, then about 1900 joined the Social Democratic Party of Switzerland. This approach inspired him to minimise the use of strikes, and exclude communists from the union. He was elected to Bern City Council in 1910, and served on the Grand Council of Bern from 1918 until 1946, and the National Council in 1918/19 and 1922 to 1947. In 1937, he signed a major peace agreement with the employers' association.

Trade union offices
Preceded by Oskar Schneeberger	President of the Swiss Metalworkers' and Watchmakers' Union; 1917–1954	Succeeded by Arthur Steiner
Preceded by Alexander Schlicke	General Secretary of the International Metalworkers' Federation; 1921–1954	Succeeded by Adolphe Graedel
