= Christian Wood and Construction Workers' Union of Switzerland =

Swiss trade union

The Christian Wood and Construction Workers' Union of Switzerland (German: Christlicher Holz- und Bauarbeiterverband, CHB) was a trade union representing construction workers in Switzerland.

When what became the Christian National Union Confederation (CNG) was founded in 1907, its affiliates included the Christian Social Central Association of Bricklayers, Stone and Earthworkers of Switzerland; the Christian Social Association of Painters and Related Professions of Switzerland; and the Christian Woodworkers' Association of Switzerland. In 1930, the first two of these unions merged to form the Central Association of Christian Construction Workers and Painters, and in 1933 this merged with the Woodworkers, to form the CHB.

In 1945, the union resigned from the CNG, but it reaffiliated in 1952. Its membership grew steadily, until it represented about a quarter of all workers in the industry in Switzerland. By 1998, it was the CNG's largest affiliate by far, with 36,397 members. The year, it merged with the Christian Metalworkers' Union of Switzerland, the Swiss Graphical Union, and the National Association of Free Swiss Employees, to form Syna.
