= World Union of Liberal Trade Union Organizations =

The World Union of Liberal Trade Union Organizations known by its French acronym UMOS-BESL (Union Mondiale des Organisations Syndicales sur le base economique et social liberal) is a trade union federation of liberally inclined unions.

== History ==
The federation was founded in Zürich in 1950.

== Aims ==
The stated aims of the group were "to improve the moral and material status of manual and intellectual workers in public and private enterprises on the basis of a free and democratic state in which the liberty and dignity of man is guaranteed, the rights of minorities recognized and all groups collaborate in a liberal economy and opposition to dictatorship and class struggle."

== Organization ==
UMOS-BESL had an annual congress which set policy and planned activities. The executive committee was made up of one delegate from each member union. In 1978 the headquarters was at Bandenerstrasse 41 CH-8004, Zurich c/o Josef Weber, the current general secretary.

== Membership ==
In 1975 the union claimed half a million members. It had seven affiliate unions, all of them in Europe, though it had formally had an affiliate in Zaire

The seven European members were:

- Austria - Arbeitsgemeinschaft parteifreier Gewerkschafter
- Belgium - General Confederation of Liberal Trade Unions of Belgium
- Germany - Deutscher Arbeitnehmer Verband
- Italy - Confederazione Italiana dei Liberi Sindacati
- Sweden - Sveriges Arbeter Liberales
- Switzerland - National Association of Free Swiss Employees
- United Kingdom - Association of Liberal Trade Unionists

== See also ==
- World Federation of Trade Unions
- International Confederation of Free Trade Unions
- World Confederation of Labour
