= Syna =

Syna is a general union in Switzerland.

The union was founded in 1998, when the Christian Wood and Construction Workers' Union of Switzerland, the Christian Union for Industry, Trade and Commerce and the Swiss Graphic Trade Union merged with the National Association of Free Swiss Employees. The first three unions were in the Catholic tradition, and the last in the liberal tradition. In 1999, the Association of Christian National Personnel of Public Enterprises in Switzerland also merged in.

The union affiliated to the Christian National Union Confederation (CNG), and was by far its largest member. On formation, it had 80,355 members, with 39% working in construction, 31% in the metal industry, 7% in woodworking, 5% in printing, and the remainder in a wide variety of industries. In 2002, the CNG merged into Travail.Suisse. By 2019, Syna's membership was down to 59,632, although it remained the largest affiliate of the federation.

== Presidents ==
1998: Peter Allemann
2002: Max Haas
2006: Kurt Regotz
2014: Arno Kerst
