= International Typographers' Secretariat =

Global union federation (1892–1949)

- Internationales Buchdrucker-Sekretariat
- Merged into: International Graphical Federation
- Founded: 25 August 1892
- Dissolved: 13 May 1949
- Headquarters: Långasstrasse 36, Bern
- Members: 137,447 (1912)
- Publication: Communications
- Affiliations: IFTU

The International Typographers' Secretariat (ITS) was a global union federation bringing together unions of printers around the world.

== History ==
An International Typographical Congress was held in Paris in July 1889, and this led to a determination to form a permanent organisation. This was established in Bern in 1892, as the International Printers' Secretariat. It held further congresses in Geneva in 1896, Lucerne in 1901, Paris in 1907, and Stuttgart in 1912.

In 1939, the federation agreed to merge with the Lithographers' International and the International Federation of Bookbinders and Kindred Trades. However, due to World War II, no progress was made until 1946, when the British Printing and Kindred Trades Federation established a committee which drafted a constitution for a merged organisation. This was established in 1949, as the International Graphical Federation.

== Affiliates ==
As of 1910, the following unions were affiliated to the federation:

Union	Country	Membership
Austrian Association of Printers' Unions	Austria	14,856
Belgian Book Printers' Union	Belgium	3,245
Bulgarian Typographical Union	Bulgaria	300
Danish Typographical Union	Denmark	3,470
French Typographic Federation	France	11,453
Finnish Typographical Union	Finland	1,626
Hungarian Printers' Mutual Benefit Association	Hungary	6,575
Italian Printers' Union	Italy	12,216
Luxembourg Printers' Union	Luxembourg	126
Norwegian Central Union of Book Printers	Norway	1,882
Romanian Gutenberg Printers' Union	Romania	424
Swedish Typographers' Union	Sweden	5,949
Swiss Typographers' Union	Switzerland	3,139
Typographical Society of Bosnia and Herzegovina	Bosnia-Herzegovina	166
Typographical Society of Serbia	Serbia	227
Typographical Union of Romantic Switzerland	Switzerland	817
Union of German Book Printers	Germany	59,027

== General Secretaries ==
1893: Gottfried Reimann
1896: Friedrich Siebenmann
1902: Pierre Stautner
1921: Fritz Verdan
1926: Hans Grundbacher
1947: Gottfried Reinhard (acting)
