= Friedrich Siebenmann (trade unionist) =

Friedrich Siebenmann (28 August 1851 – 1 January 1901) was a Swiss trade union leader and politician.

Born in Aarau, Siebenmann completed an apprenticeship as a typesetter. He then joined the Swiss Typographers' Union (STB) and spent his journeyman years travelling the country before moving to Paris. Next, he settled in Freiburg, then in 1874 moved to Bern. In 1884, he became the president of his section of the STB, then in 1885 became national president, and in 1887 general secretary.

An early member of the Social Democratic Party of Switzerland, Siebenmann was one of the party's first elected representatives, winning a seat on Bern City Council in 1886, initially as part of a joint list with the Liberals. In 1891, he founded the Bern Railway Workers' Association, and in 1892, he organised the founding conference of the International Printers' Secretariat, serving as its secretary from 1896. In 1895, he additionally became the first president of the Swiss Workers' Union. He died at the start of 1901.

Trade union offices
Preceded by Gottfried Reimann	General Secretary of the International Printers' Secretariat; 1896–1901	Succeeded by Pierre Stautner
