= Swiss Lithographers' Union =

The Swiss Lithographers' Union (German: Schweizerische Lithographenbund, SLB; French: Union Suisse des Lithographes) was a trade union representing printers in Switzerland.

The union was founded in 1888 in Winterthur, to represent lithographers and other flat-bed printers, such as copperplate printers and chemographers. It based itself in Bern and in 1893 it affiliated to the Swiss Trade Union Federation (SGB).

The union came into frequent demarcation disputes with the Swiss Typographers' Union, and was suspended from the SGB from 1925 until 1928 amid a dispute over offset printers; to rejoin, it had to concede that they should join its rival. Despite this, the union grew, by 1954, it had 3,059 members, From 1944 to 1958, the union's central secretary was Friedrich Segessenmann. and by 1979 this had risen to 6,279.

In the 1980s, professional boundaries in the industry weakened, and in 1998 it merged with Union of Printing and Paper, the Employees' Union of the Swiss Book Trade, and the Swiss Union of Journalists, to form Comedia.
