= Union of Communication =

Swiss trade union

The Union of Communication (German: Gewerkschaft Kommunikation, GEKO; French: Syndicat de la communication) was a trade union representing workers in the communication sector in Switzerland.

The union was founded on 26 October 1998, when the Union of Swiss Postal, Telegraph and Telephone Personnel merged with the Union of Swiss Postal Employees, the Union of Swiss Telegraph and Telephone Supervisors, the Association of Swiss Air Traffic Control Personnel, the Post Office Keepers' Association and the postal section of the Staff Association of the Federal Administration. It affiliated to the Swiss Trade Union Federation.

On formation, the union had 42,575 members, but it struggled following the removal of Swiss Post workers from the civil service, and the emergence of various private parcel carriers. On 1 January 2011, it merged with Comedia, to form Syndicom.

== Presidents ==
1998:
2003: Christian Levrat
2008: Alain Carrupt
