= List of mayors of Biel/Bienne =

Coat of arms of Biel/Bienne

This is a list of mayors of the city of Biel/Bienne, Switzerland.

Mayor (Stadtpräsident/Maire) of Biel/Bienne
Term	Mayor	Lifespan	Party	Notes
1898–1901	Johann Hofmann-Moll	(1842–1901)		
1901–1907	Eduard Stauffer	(1860–1907)		
1907–1909	Gottfried Reimann	(1862–1909)	Grütliverein/SPS/PSS	
1909–1921	Louis Leuenberger	(1857–1921)	FDP/PRD	
1921 (May–November)	Hermann Kistler	(1880–1970)	SPS/PSS	
1921–1947	Guido Müller	(1875–1963)	SPS/PSS	
1948–1960	Edouard Baumgartner	(1892–1967)	PNR/FDP/PRD	
1961–1964	Paul Schaffroth	(1921–2009)	FDP/PRD	
1964–1976	Fritz Stähli	(1913?-1982)	FDP/PRD	
1976–1990	Hermann Fehr	(born 1941)	SPS/PSS	
1991–2010	Hans Stöckli	(born 1952)	SPS/PSS	
2011–present	Erich Fehr	(born 1968)	SPS/PSS	
