= Travail.Suisse =

- Founded: 14 December 2002
- Headquarters: Bern, Switzerland
- Location: Switzerland
- Members: 140,000
- Key people: Adrian Wüthrich, president Josiane Aubert, vice-president Meinrado Robbiani, vice-president Kurt Regotz, vice-president
- Affiliations: ETUC
- Website: www.travailsuisse.ch

Travail.Suisse is a trade union federation in Switzerland.

== History ==
The federation was formed in December 2002 by the merger of the Christian National Union Confederation (CNG) and the Confederation of Swiss Employees' Associations (VSA). Through the CNG, Travail.Suisse traces into roots back to 1907. Initially, the federation represented around 170,000 workers.

== Affiliates ==
=== Current affiliates ===
Union	Abbreviation	Founded	Membership (2019)
Association of Hungarian Christian Workers in Switzerland	VUCAS		48
Association of Personnel Representatives of the Swiss Electricity Industry	VPE		1,010
Christian Social Organisation of Ticino	OCST		41,677
Employees ABB	AVABB		1,491
Hotel & Gastro Union	HGU	1886	18,372
Interprofessional Christian Unions of Valais	SCIV		10,777
Swiss Pharmacists' Association	SDV	1898	151
Syna	Syna	1998	59,632
transfair		2000	10,263
Union of University Lecturers in Switzerland	FH-CH		922

=== Former affiliates ===
Union	Abbreviation	Affiliated	Left	Reason not affiliated	Membership (2002)
Association of Christian Czech and Slovak Workers in Switzerland	VCTSA	2002	2003	Dissolved	112
Association of Documentary Information Assistants	AAID	2002	2010	Resigned	32
Fedpol Staff Association	PVfedpol	2007	2013	Resigned	N/A
Romandy Association of Qualified Speech Therapists	ARLD	2008			N/A
Swiss Association of Insurance Inspectors and Agents	SVVIA	2002	2004	Resigned	227
Swiss Employees	AS	2006	2012	Resigned	N/A
Swiss Laboratory Staff Association	SLV	2002	2004	Merged into VSAC	1,003
United Swiss Staff Associations in the Chemical Industry	VSAC	2002	2006	Merged into AS	5,130
United Swiss Staff Associations in the Machine and Electrical Industries	VSAM	2002	2006	Merged into AS	17,569
