= Union of Printing and Paper =

The Union of Printing and Paper (German: Gewerkschaft Druck und Papier, GDP; French: Syndicat du livre et du papier) was a trade union representing most printing industry workers in Switzerland.

The union was founded in 1980, when the Swiss Typographers' Union merged with the Swiss Bookbinders' and Carton Makers' Union. Like both its predecessors, it affiliated to the Swiss Trade Union Federation. The union was led by president Erwin Gerster, and in 1981 he faced competition for re-election from the president of the union's Zurich branch. During the count, the Zurich candidate was suspected of electoral fraud, and a criminal investigation led the union to announce that the election would be re-run. However, before it could do so, the Zurich candidate withdrew, and Gerster remained in office until 1989.

The 1980s was a difficult time for the union, which found itself in a weakening position with regard to both employers and unskilled workers in the industry. By 1995, it had 13,876 members. With professional boundaries in the industry less important, in 1998 it merged with the Swiss Lithographers' Union, the Employees' Union of the Swiss Book Trade, and the Swiss Union of Journalists, to form Comedia.

== Central Presidents ==
1980: Erwin Gerster
1989: Christian Tirefort
