= Swiss Customs Employees' Union =

The Swiss Customs Employees' Union (German: Verbandes des Schweizerischen Zollpersonals, VSZP) was a trade union representing customs officials in Switzerland.

The union was founded in 1906, as the Union of Swiss Customs Workers, and it affiliated to the Swiss Trade Union Federation. It was the largest organisation of customs staff in the country, with 3,464 by 1954. In 2001, it merged with its smaller rival, the Union of Swiss Customs Officials, to form Garanto.
