= Transfair =

Labor union in Switzerland

Transfair is a trade union representing public sector workers in Switzerland.

The union was founded on 1 January 2000, when the Swiss Union of Christian Postal, Telephone and Telegraph Personnel merged with the Christian Union of Transport, Military and Customs and the Union of Christian Government Personnel. The unions had previously co-operated for many years in the Association of Trade Unions of Christian Transport and State Personnel.

Like all its predecessors, Transfair affiliated to the Christian National Union Confederation (CNG). It initially had about 20,000 members. In 2002, the CNG became part of Travail.Suisse, and Transfair transferred over. In 2012, it absorbed the Swisscom Management Association, followed in 2016 by the EPH Staff Association.

By 2019, its membership was down to 10,263.

== Presidents ==
2000: Regula Hartmann-Bertschi
2003: Hugo Gerber
2008: Daniel Schütz
2009: Chiara Simoneschi-Cortesi
2014: Stefan Müller-Altermatt
