= Syndicom =

Swiss trade union of media and communication

Syndicom is a trade union representing communication, IT and media workers in Switzerland.

The union was founded on 3 December 2010, when the Union of Communication merged with Comedia. Like both its predecessors, it affiliated to the Swiss Trade Union Federation. On formation, it had 47,000 members, but by 2017, this was down to 35,000.

== Presidents ==
2010: Alain Carrupt and Danièle Lenzin
2013: Alain Carrupt
2017: Daniel Münger
