= Christian Metalworkers' Union of Switzerland =

Swiss trade union

The Christian Metalwokers' Union of Switzerland (German: Christlicher Metallarbeiterverband der Schweiz, CMV) was a trade union representing workers in heavy industry in Switzerland.

The union was founded by Catholic workers in 1905, in opposition to the social democratic Swiss Metalworkers' Union. Initially mostly active in eastern Switzerland, in 1907 it was a founding affiliate of what later became the Christian National Union Confederation (CNG). From the 1910s, it began to grow and spread across the country, hiring a full-time secretary for the first time in 1917.

By the 1970s, the union had more than 30,000 members, and was one of the largest affiliates of the CNG. However, its membership then began to fall. Negotiations in 1984 around a merger with the Christian Chemical, Textile, Clothing, Paper and Staff Union (CTB) were unsuccessful. In 1990, the renamed itself as the Christian Union for Industry, Trade and Commerce, while retaining its CMV abbreviation. It absorbed the Christian Transport, Commerce and Food Workers' Union in 1992, the Swiss Federation of Protestant Trade Unions in 1993, and then in 1994 the CTB finally merged in.

In 1998, the union merged with the Christian Wood and Construction Workers' Union of Switzerland, the Swiss Graphical Union, and the National Association of Free Swiss Employees, to form Syna.
