= Swiss Commercial Association =

Workers union

The Swiss Commercial Association (German: Kaufmännischer Verband Schweiz, KV Schweiz; French: Société suisse des employés de commerce) is a trade union representing white collar private sector workers in Switzerland.

== History ==
The union was founded in 1873, with the merger of several local unions of shopkeepers. Initially abbreviated as the SKV, by 1900 it had 6,392 members. Initially, it focused on training members and maintaining professional standards, but from World War I onwards, it took more interest in preserving pay and conditions during downturns.

In 1918, the union played a leading role in founding the Confederation of Swiss Employees' Associations (VSA), and for many years provided more than half the federation's membership. The same year, it began admitting women, although they played only a marginal role until the 1980s.

The union grew rapidly, to reach 28,574 members in 1920, 52,350 in 1950, and 72,315 in 1975. It then began to decline, and by 1997 had 63,770 members, of whom 36% worked in production, 26% in finance, 23% in commerce, 12% in other administration, and 3% in hospitality. In 2000, it left the VSA, and reordered the words in its title, to become KV Schweiz. By 2009, membership was down to 52,000. The majority of its income continues to come from vocational training.

From 2006 to 2011, Mario Fehr was the President of the association.
