= Social Democratic group (Switzerland) =

Parliamentary group in Switzerland

Social Democratic group (S) Sozialdemokratische fraktion Groupe socialiste Gruppo socialista Fracziun Socialdemocratica
- Chamber: Swiss National Council and Council of States
- Foundation: 1911
- Member parties: SP/PS
- President: Roger Nordmann
- Representation: 48 / 246
- Ideology: Center-left to left-wing

The Social Democratic Group (German: Sozialdemokratische fraktion, French: Groupe socialiste, Italian: Gruppo socialista, abbreviated S) is the second largest parliamentary group in the Swiss Federal Assembly. It is formed by the Social Democratic Party of Switzerland.

The Social Democratic Party were represented in the National Council; they sat as part of the Social-Political group with the democrats from 1896 then formed their own parliamentary group in 1911.

== Composition ==
Historical composition of the Social Democratic group
Legislature	NC	CS	Total	Changes during the legislature
22nd (1912)	17	1	18	Gained 1 NC in 1913 then gained 1 NC in 1914
23rd (1914)	19	1	20	Lost 1 NC in 1916 then lost 1 NC in 1917
24th (1917)	19	1	20	
25th (1919)	41	0	41	Lost 3 NC then regained 1 NC in 2021
26th (1922)	43	1	44	Lost 1 NC then regained 1 NC in 1924
27th (1925)	49	2	51	
28th (1928)	50	0	50	Gained 1 CS in 1930
29th (1931)	49	2	51	Lost 1 CS then 1 NC in 1933, then regained 1 NC in 1934
30th (1935)	50	3	53	
31st (1939)	45	3	48	
32nd (1943)	56	5	61	Lost 2 NC in 1944, gained 1 CS in 1945, then gained 1 NC in 1947
33rd (1947)	48	5	53	Lost 1 CS in 1948 then gained and lost 1 CS in 1949
34th (1951)	49	4	53	
35th (1955)	53	5	58	
36th (1969)	51	2	53	
37th (1963)	53	3	56	
38th (1967)	51	2	53	
39th (1971)	46	4	50	
40th (1975)	55	5	60	Gained 1 CS in 1978
41st (1979)	51	9	60	
42nd (1983)	47	6	53	
43rd (1987)	42	5	47	
44th (1991)	43	3	46	
45th (1995)	58	5	63	Lost 1 NC in 1999
46th (1999)	53	6	59	Lost 1 NC in 2002
47th (2003)	52	9	61	
48th (2007)	43	9	52	Lost 1 NC in 2009, lost 1 NC in 2010, then lost 1 CS in 2011
49th (2011)	46	11	57	
50th (2015)	43	12	55	Lost 1 NC in 2019
51st (2019)	39	8	47	

== List of presidents of the group ==
The group is currently presided by national councillor Roger Nordmann (VD)

- Herman Greulich (1911)
- Hans Affolter (1917)
- Ernest-Paul Graber (1918)
- Arthur Schmid sr. (1925)
- Robert Grimm (1936)
- Walther Bringolf (1945)
- Fritz Grütter (1953)
- Mathias Eggenberger (1957)
- Pierre Graber (1966)
- Edmund Wyss (1969)
- Anton Muheim (1971)
- Richard Müller (1972)
- Heinz Bratschi (1978)
- René Felber (1980)
- Félicien Morel (1981)
- Dario Robbianni (1983)
- Ursula Mauch (1987)
- Ursula Hafner (1995)
- Franco Cavalli (1999)
- Hildegard Fässler (2002)
- Ursula Wyss (2006)
- Andy Tschümperlin (2012)
- Roger Nordmann (2015)
