= AvenirSocial =

AvenirSocial is a trade union representing social workers in Switzerland.

The union was founded in 2005, when the Swiss Professional Association of Social Work merged with the much smaller Swiss Professional Association of Social Education and Romandy Federation of Workers in Social Education. It affiliated to the Swiss Trade Union Federation, and on founding had 3,129 members. By 2017, the union's membership had grown slightly, to 3,418.
