= Union of Construction and Wood =

The Union of Construction and Wood (German: Gewerkschaft Bau und Holz, GBH; French: Syndicat du bâtiment et du bois) was a trade union representing workers in the building and woodworking industries in Switzerland.

The union was founded in 1922, when the Swiss Construction Workers' Union merged with the Swiss Woodworkers' Union, to form the Swiss Construction and Woodworkers' Union, with 15,232 members. It affiliated to the Swiss Trade Union Federation, and by 1954 was its second-largest affiliate, with 71,813 members. In 1974, it renamed itself as the GBH, and in 1986 it became the largest union in the country. Unusually, at times, a majority of the member were non-Swiss nationals. By 1990, it had 124,501 members, 90% of whom worked in construction.

At the start of 1993, the union merged with the much smaller Union of Textiles, Chemicals and Paper, to form the Union of Construction and Industry.

== Presidents ==
1922: Johann Halmer
1937: Franz Reichmann
1940:
Michael Rösch
1956: Gallus Berger
1968: Ezio Canonica
1978: Max Zuberbühler
1987: Roland Roost
1991: Vasco Pedrina
