= Union of Construction and Industry =

The Union of Construction and Industry (German: Gewerkschaft Bau und Industrie, GBI; French: Syndicat industrie et bâtiment) was a trade union representing workers in various industries in Switzerland.

The union was founded on 1 January 1993, when the Union of Construction and Wood merged with the Union of Textiles, Chemicals and Paper. The union was the largest in Switzerland, with an initial 125,000 members, and it affiliated to the Swiss Trade Union Federation.

The GBI adopted a more left-wing position than its predecessors, leading industrial action including a major strike of construction workers in 2002. However, many of the areas it covered were in decline, and its membership fell accordingly. By 1998, its membership was down to 99,780, with 90% working in construction, 8% in woodworking, and just 2% in other areas. In 2003, membership had fallen a little further, to 90,983, and the following year, the union merged with the Union for Industry, Trade and Services and the Union of Sales, Trade, Transport and Food, forming Unia.

Throughout its history, the union was led by Vasco Pedrina.
