= Swiss Bookbinders' and Carton Makers' Union =

Trade union in Switzerland

The Swiss Bookbinders' and Carton' Makers' Union (German: Schweizerischer Buchbinder- und Kartonagerverband, SBKV; French: Fédération suissse des relieurs et cartonniers) was a trade union representing bookbinders, stationers and box makers in Switzerland.

The union was founded on 9 June 1889, in Zürich, as the Swiss Bookbinders' Union, and in 1893, it joined the Swiss Trade Union Federation. It also joined the International Federation of Bookbinders and Kindred Trades, and by 1922, it had 1,266 members. In 1943, it adopted its final name, and by 1954, its membership had risen to 4,465.

In 1980, the SBKV merged with the Swiss Typographers' Union, to form the Union of Printing and Paper.
