= Robert Bratschi =

Swiss politician and trade unionist (1891–1981)

Robert Bratschi (6 February 1891 – 24 May 1981) was a Swiss politician and trade unionist.

Born in Bözingen (now part of Biel/Bienne), Bratschi found work with the Swiss Federal Railways, becoming a station master, and then an administrative worker. He joined the Swiss Railwaymen's Association (SEV), and was elected as its general secretary in 1920. He also joined the Social Democratic Party of Switzerland (SP), and in 1922 was elected to Bern City Council, and to the National Council. In 1932, he moved to serve on the council of the Canton of Bern, while remaining on the National Council.

From 1934, Bratschi was president of the Swiss Trade Union Federation, the leading position in Swiss trade unionism. In 1950, he also won election as president of the International Transport Workers' Federation.

At the end of 1953, Bratschi stood down from all his trade union positions, to become a director of the Bern–Lötschberg–Simplon railway. He remained politically active, and in 1957/58, served as President of the National Council of Switzerland. He supported the SP accepting seats on the Federal Council, and played a key role in agreeing the "magic formula" in 1959, which enabled them to do so. He finally retired in 1967.

Trade union offices
Preceded by Emil Düby	Leader of the Swiss Railwaymen's Association; 1920–1953	Succeeded by Hans Düby
Preceded by Oskar Schneeberger	President of the Swiss Trade Union Federation; 1934–1953	Succeeded by Arthur Steiner
Preceded by Omer Becu	President of the International Transport Workers' Federation; 1950–1953	Succeeded by Arthur Deakin
Political offices
Preceded by Joseph Condrau	President of the National Council of Switzerland; 1957–1958	Succeeded by Eugen Dietschi
