= Union of Textiles, Chemicals and Paper =

The Union of Textiles, Chemicals and Paper (German: Gewerkschaft Textil, Chemie, Papier, GTCP; French: Fédération du personnel du textile, de la chimie et du papier) was a trade union representing workers in various industries in Switzerland.

In 1903, various local unions of dyers, trimmers, weavers and embroiderers formed a loose federation. In 1908, this was reformed as the more centralised Swiss Textile Workers' Union. It affiliated to the Swiss Trade Union Federation in 1914, although this prompted most of the weavers and embroiderers, not yet working in factories, to leave and form an independent union, rejoining only in 1948.

By 1919, the union had 23,991 members, but this fell to 7,626 in 1925 and remained low for the following decades. In 1926, the Union of Paper and Graphical Assistants was dissolved, the paper workers transferring to the Swiss Textile Workers' Union. In 1937, the union renamed itself as the Union of Textile and Factory Workers, reflecting its interest in organising workers not previously organised by any union. The bulk of these workers were in the chemical industry, and recruitment was hugely successful, membership reaching 38,648 in 1946, during a period in which the union was involved in several strikes.

After 1947, the union avoided industrial action, and its membership steadily fell. In 1963, it renamed itself as the GTCP. By 1991, it had only 11,581 members, of whom 70% worked in the chemical industry, 20% in textiles, and 10% in paper. In 1993, it merged with the Union of Construction and Wood, to form the Union of Construction and Industry.
