= Comedia (trade union) =

Swiss trade union

Comedia was a trade union representing print and media workers in Switzerland.

The union was founded in December 1998, when the Union of Printing and Paper merged with the Swiss Lithographers' Union, the Employees' Union of the Swiss Book Trade, and the Swiss Union of Journalists. It affiliated to the Swiss Trade Union Federation, and initially had about 17,000 members.

Originally, the union was divided into six sectors, but in 2005, it restructured its members into four sectors: graphics, books and media, press and culture, and graphical communication.

On 3 December 2010, Comedia merged with the Union of Communication, to form Syndicom.

== Presidents ==
1998: Christian Tirefort
2005: Roland Kreuzer and Danièle Lenzin
