= Swiss Clothing, Leather and Equipment Workers' Union =

The Swiss Clothing, Leather and Equipment Workers' Union (German: Verband der Bekleidungs-, Leder- und Ausrüstungs-Arbeitnehmer der Schweiz, VBLA; French: Fédération suisse des ouvriers du vêtement, du cuir et de l'équipement) was a trade union representing workers in the clothing and leather industries.

The Clothing and Leather Workers' Union was expelled from the Swiss Trade Union Federation (SGB) in 1930, after the Communist Party of Switzerland assumed its leadership. The SGB founded the Union of Clothing and Equipment Industry Workers as a replacement, and in 1938, it became the VBLA. In 1942, it was joined by the Swiss Hairdressers' Union, and the Homeworkers' Union of the Clothing and Laundry Industry, and in 1947 by the Swiss Hat and Cap Workers' Union.

The union's peak membership was 13,004 in 1947, but by 1963 it had fallen to only 6,861, and by 1991 to only 1,974. The following year, it merged into the Swiss Metalworkers' and Watchmakers' Union.
