= Unia (union) =

Swiss labor union

Unia is a trade union representing private sector workers in Switzerland.

== History ==
Unia is the largest member of the Swiss Trade Union Confederation (SGB or USS) with around 170,000 members. In addition its collective agreements affect the conditions of a million Swiss workers. It was formed on 16 October 2004 from the merger of the Union of Construction and Industry (GBI), the Union of Industry, Construction and Services, the Union of Sales, Trade, Transport and Food, the old (working in the service sector) unia and the Geneva trade union in the tertiary sector.

In 2011, seafarers and boat personnel in the union transferred to Nautilus International.

== Presidents ==
2004: Renzo Ambrosetti and Vasco Pedrina
2006: Renzo Ambrosetti and Andreas Rieger
2012: Vania Alleva and Renzo Ambrosetti
2015: Vania Alleva
2016: Vania Alleva
2021: Vania Alleva
