= Roger Nordmann =

Swiss politician (born 1973)

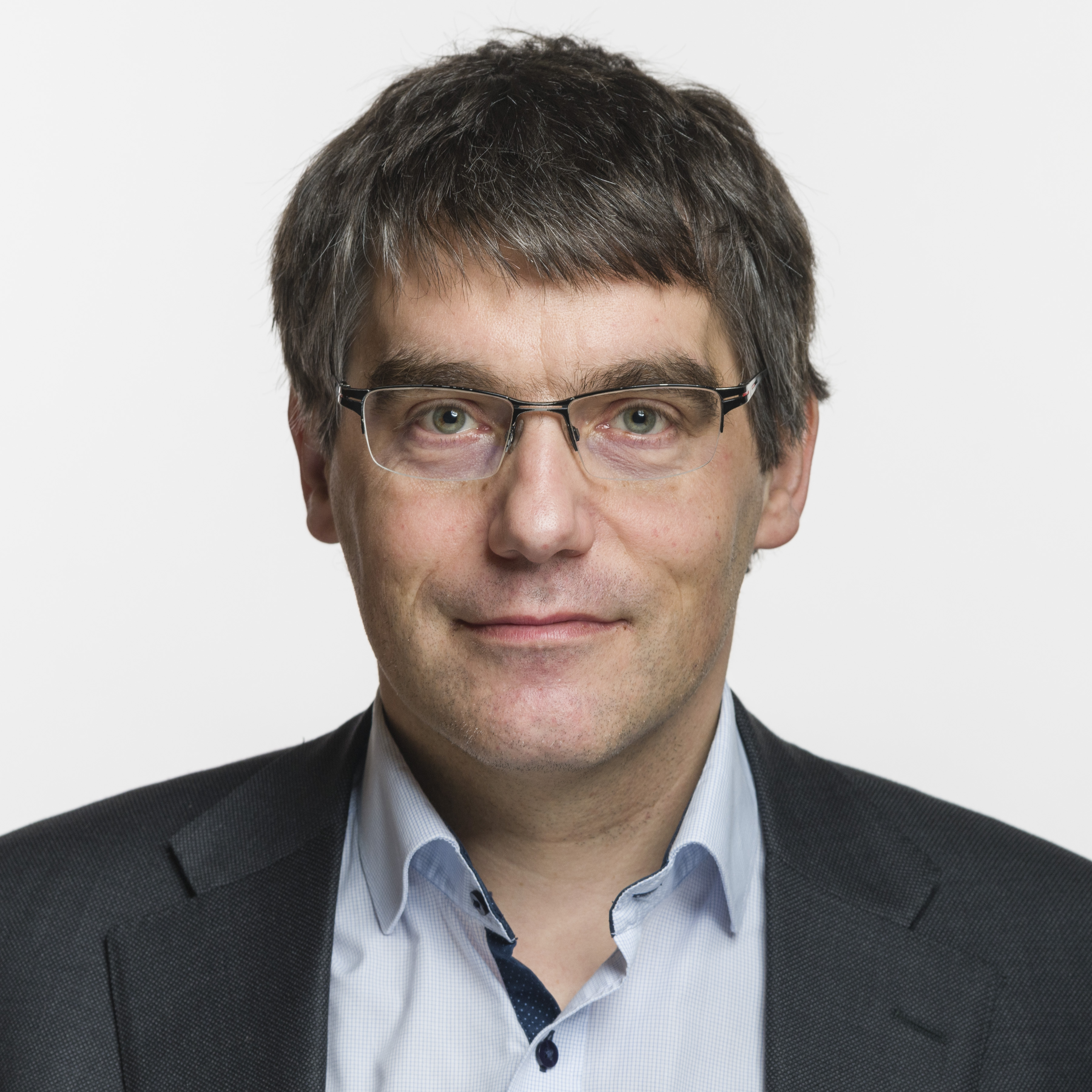
- Official portrait, 2019

President of the Social Democratic group
- Incumbent
- Assumed office 20 November 2015

Member of the National Council (Switzerland)
- Incumbent
- Assumed office 20 November 2004
- Preceded by: Pierre-Yves Maillard
- Constituency: Canton of Vaud

Member of the Grand Council of Vaud
- In office 1999–2004

Personal details
- Born: Roger Nicolas Nordmann; March 23, 1973 (age 53) Lausanne, Vaud, Switzerland
- Party: Social Democratic Party
- Spouse: Florence Germond (m. 2003)
- Children: 2
- Education: University of Bern; University of Bologna (Licentiate); University of Geneva (Diploma)
- Website: Official website Parliament website

Roger Nicolas Nordmann (French pronunciation: [ʁɔʒe nɔʁdman]; born 23 March 1973) is a Swiss politician who currently serves on the National Council for the Social Democratic Party since 2004. He has also been the president of the Social Democratic group.

== Early life and education ==
Nordmann was born 23 March 1973 in Lausanne, Switzerland to Philippe Nordmann, an attorney, and Ursula Nordmann (née Zimmermann), a former federal judge. Both his parents were members of the Social Democratic Party since 1972 respectively 1975. He is of Jewish descent on his paternal side being an offspring of the Fribourg line of the Nordmann family who originally hailed from Hégenheim, France. His paternal grandfather was attorney Pierre Nordmann, who chaired Nordmann & Cie SA in Fribourg.

He was primarily raised in Mézières and Moudon before ultimately completing his Matura in 1991 in Lausanne. He then completed a Licentiate at the University of Bern and the University of Bologna. In 2000, Nordmann completed a diploma in Legal Affairs at the University of Geneva.

== Politics ==
Between 1998 and 1999, Nordmann served on the city council (legislature) of Lausanne followed by appointment to constitutional councilor from 1999 to 2002. Concurrently he served on the Grand Council of Vaud until August 2004. Since 20 November 2004 he serves on the National Council (Switzerland).

In 2023, Nordmann made public his resignation as president of the Social Democratic Group. At the same time he announced candidacy for the presidency of PUK (Parliamentary Investigatory Commission).

== Personal life ==
Since 2003, Nordmann is married to Florence Germond, and has two children. They reside in Lausanne, Switzerland.
