= L'Avenir Social =

French orphanage

L'Avenir Social was a French orphanage open from 1906 to 1922 and known for the libertarian (anarchist) philosophy of its founder, Madeleine Vernet.

== History ==
With her family's support, Madeleine Vernet opened the orphanage on 1 May 1906, in Neuilly-Plaisance. It quickly expanded to a second building in August and by April 1908, moved to Épône, whose local population rejected Vernet's work. The orphanage had 24 boarders its first year, followed by 30 the next year, about more than half boys. During World War I, Vernet was forced to leave Épône for Etretat until the Western Front stabilized. In January 1923, the Communist majority on the orphanage's board ousted Vernet, who was not a Communist, as its leader.

The orphanage moved to Mitry-Mory in June 1923 and was overtaken by the Seine departmental union in 1925, whereupon it again relocated to La Villette-aux-Aulnes as L'Orphelinat Ouvrier. It closed in 1938.

== Administration ==
The orphanage was funded through Vernet's mother's savings, donations from friends, the La Bellevilloise cooperative, and journal subscriptions.

Vernet was associated with French libertarian (anarchist) social circles by the early 1900s. She wrote for libertarian journals and spoke on women's rights, free love, and against Neomalthusianism. She was an pacifist activist during World War I.
