= Union of Transport Workers =

Swiss trade union

The Union of Transport Workers (German: Gewerkschaft des Verkehrspersonals, SEV) is a trade union in Switzerland.

== History ==
Many transport workers were involved in the 1918 Swiss general strike, and this inspired members of various small unions to found a national union for railway workers. It was established in 1919, as the Swiss Railwaymen's Association, and immediately affiliated to the Swiss Trade Union Federation. While it had a centralised political leadership, under Robert Bratschi, linked with the Social Democratic Party and based in Bern, many of its sectoral groups operated with a high degree of autonomy in industrial matters.

While the main base of the union was workers for the public railway system, it accepted other transport workers, including bus workers, people working for private and municipal transport systems and workers in shipping. In 1995, it was renamed as the Swiss Railway and Transport Staff Association, to emphasise the role of these other workers, then in 2009 it became the "Union of Transport Workers".

== Leadership ==
The union was led by its general secretary until 1946, and since then by its president.

1919: Emil Düby
1920: Robert Bratschi
1953: Hans Düby
1972: Werner Meier
1981: Jean Clivaz
1987: Charly Pasche
1996: Ernst Leuenberger
2005: Pierre-Alain Gentil
2008: Giorgio Tuti
2023: Matthias Hartwich
