= Swiss Musicians' Union =

Swiss trade union

The Swiss Musicians' Union (German: Schweizerischer Musikerverband, SMV; French: Union Suisse des Artistes Musiciens) is a trade union representing musicians in Switzerland.

The union was founded on 1 October 1914 as a split from the General German Musicians' Union. It affiliated to the Confederation of Swiss Employees' Associations (VSA) in 1929, and by 1954, it had 1,104 members. In the 1990s, it transferred to the Swiss Trade Union Federation, and by 2017, its membership had grown slightly, to 1,690.
