= Federal Staff Association =

Trade union in Switzerland

The Federal Staff Association (German: Personalverband des Bundes, PVB; French: Association du personnel de la Confédération) is a trade union representing civil servants in Switzerland.

The union was founded in 1912 as the Association of Civil Servants and Employees of the Federal Central Administration. In 1973, it became the Staff Association of the General Federal Administration, and then in 1984 the Staff Association of the Federal Administration. By 1997, it had 15,748 members, of whom 88% worked in public administration, and the remainder in communications. In 1998, the latter group transferred to the new Union of Communication.

Having long worked closely with the Swiss Trade Union Federation, the PVB became an associate member in 2004, and a full member in 2007. By 2017, its membership was down to 8,867.
