= Swiss Music Pedagogic Association =

The Swiss Music Pedagogic Association (SMPA) (in German Schweizerischer Musikpädagogischer Verband (SMPV), in French Société Suisse de Pédagogie Musicale (SSPM), in Italian Società Svizzera di Pedagogia Musicale (SSPM), in Romansh Societad Svizra da Pedagogia Musicala (SSPM)) is the umbrella organisation of music educators, pedagogues and music teachers in Switzerland.

The SMPA has been founded in 1893 and nowadays has about 5000 members. It is divided in 21 sections (capital seat in Bern); acting chairman is Jakob Stämpfli.
