= Swiss Typographers' Union =

Swiss trade union

The Swiss Typographers' Union (German: Schweizerischer Typographenbund, STB; French: Fédération Suisse des Typographes) was a trade union representing printers, based in Switzerland.

The union was founded in 1858 in Olten, becoming the first enduring trade union in Switzerland. It achieved early success by negotiating wage increases, leading many strikes, and in 1912 it achieved a closed shop agreement, in co-ordination with its Christian and liberal rivals. It was an early member of the Swiss Trade Union Federation, while in 1892, it led the formation of the International Typographers' Secretariat, thereafter hosting its headquarters.

By the end of World War I, the union had a national presence, although until 1926 it did not admit women or workers it considered to be less skilled. By 1954, the union had 10,560 members, and this rose to 15,466 by 1979. The following year, it merged with the Swiss Bookbinders' and Carton Makers' Union to form the Union of Printing and Paper.

== Central Presidents ==
1858: Ed. Albrecht
1862: U. Müller
1863: Fr. Niklaus
1864: J. Kleinert
1865: J. Boß
1866: F. Wittmer
1867: K. Ehrensberger
1868: H. Schweizer
1870: J. Rüegg
1872: Fabian Lack
1874: K. Ehrensberger
1876: H. Schweizer
1880: J. Kummer
1886: Friedrich Siebenmann
1888: F. Käser
1889: J. Frank
1892: J. Leisinger
1893: H. Unteregger
1895: A. Ammann
1898: A. Hagmann
1900: E. Pfister
1904: E. Blaser
1905: F. Brosi
1906: Fritz Verdan
1917: Hans Grundbacher
1922: H. Bräuchi
1924:
1927: Hans Huber
1946: Karl Aeschbacher
1950s: Eduard Harsch
1967: Erwin Gerster
