= Union of Industry, Construction and Services =

Swiss trade union (1888–2004)

Swiss Metalworkers' and Watchmakers' Union
- Successor: Unia
- Formation: 1888
- Dissolved: 2004
- Type: Trade union
- Purpose: Labour representation
- Headquarters: Switzerland
- Members: 88,000 (2003)

The Union of Industry, Construction and Services (Note: German: Gewerkschaft Industrie, Gewerbe, Dienstleistungen, Smuv); French: Syndicat de l'industrie, de la construction et des services, FTMH; Italian: Sindacato dell'industria, della costruzione e dei servizi, FLMO) (originally known as the Swiss Metalworkers' Federation (Note: German: Schweiz. Metallarbeiterverbandes, Smav; French: Fédération suisse des ouvriers sur métaux; Italian: Fed erazione sviz. dei lavoratori metallurgici, FLM) and later as the Swiss Metalworkers and Watchmakers Federation (Note: German: Schweiz. Metall- und Uhrenarbeiterverband, Smuv; French: Fédération suisse des ouvriers sur métaux et horlogers, FOMH; Italian: Federazione sviz. dei lavoratori metallurgici e orologiai, FLMO) then Swiss Industry, Construction and Services Federation) was a Swiss trade union that existed from 1888 to 2004. It primarily represented workers in the metalworking, watchmaking, and later construction and service industries.

== History ==
The first local organizations of metalworking and watchmaking workers emerged as early as the 1830s, but remained relatively unstable until the 1870s. The Swiss Metalworkers' Federation (Note: German: Schweiz. Metallarbeiterverbandes, Smav; French: Fédération suisse des ouvriers sur métaux; Italian: Fed erazione sviz. dei lavoratori metallurgici, FLM) was established in 1888.

In 1915, the Swiss Metalworkers' Federation merged with the Federation of Watchmaking Workers, which had been founded after two unsuccessful attempts and was burdened with debt following a strike. The merger created the Swiss Metalworkers and Watchmakers Federation. (Note: German: Schweiz. Metall- und Uhrenarbeiterverband, Smuv; French: Fédération suisse des ouvriers sur métaux et horlogers, FOMH; Italian: Federazione sviz. dei lavoratori metallurgici e orologiai, FLMO) In 1972, the organization adopted the name Swiss Industry, Construction and Services Federation.

World War I led to a rapid increase in membership. However, during the 1920s, membership fell by half due to the post-war economic crisis and disappointment with results that fell short of expectations. During this decade, the few existing collective agreements disappeared (either terminated or not renewed). Despite these setbacks, the union achieved internal consolidation through the establishment of unemployment insurance, the renunciation of strikes, and the exclusion of opposition elements.

This internal consolidation, combined with centralization and professionalized leadership (particularly under Konrad Ilg), had a positive influence from the 1930s to the 1970s on industrial peace, including the notable labour peace agreement of 1937. These developments strengthened the position of watchmaking workers in negotiations with employers.

The union's membership grew significantly during the post-war boom, reaching 136,000 members in 1963 and peaking at 145,000 in 1975. However, the depoliticization of workers during the period of high economic growth and a long-standing attitude of rejection toward foreign workers led to recruitment problems after 1965, except during the economic crisis of 1974–1975. The shift from manual workers to white-collar employees, who showed limited interest in unionism, further complicated recruitment efforts.

In the difficult economic context of the 1990s, the FTMH adopted new structures and expanded by absorbing the Swiss Clothing, Leather and Equipment Workers' Union. In 1992, it took the name Union of Industry, Construction and Services (Note: German: Gewerkschaft Industrie, Gewerbe, Dienstleistungen, Smuv); French: Syndicat de l'industrie, de la construction et des services, FTMH; Italian: Sindacato dell'industria, della costruzione e dei servizi, FLMO) while retaining the acronym SMUV.

By 1998, the union had 95,315 members, of whom 91% worked in the metal industry, and the remainder across a variety of sectors. In 2004, it merged with the Union of Commerce, Transport and Food and the Union of Construction and Industry, to form Unia.

== Presidents ==
1915: Oskar Schneeberger
1917: Konrad Ilg
1954: Arthur Steiner
1958: Ernst Wüthrich
1972: Hans Mischler
1976: Gilbert Tschumi
1980: Fritz Reimann
1988: Agostino Tarabusi
1992: Christiane Brunner
2000: Renzo Ambrosetti
