= Swiss Trade Union Federation =

Swiss umbrella organisation of trade unions

SGB/USS
- Swiss Trade Union Federation
- Schweizerischer Gewerkschaftsbund; Union Syndicale Suisse; Unione Sindacale Svizzera

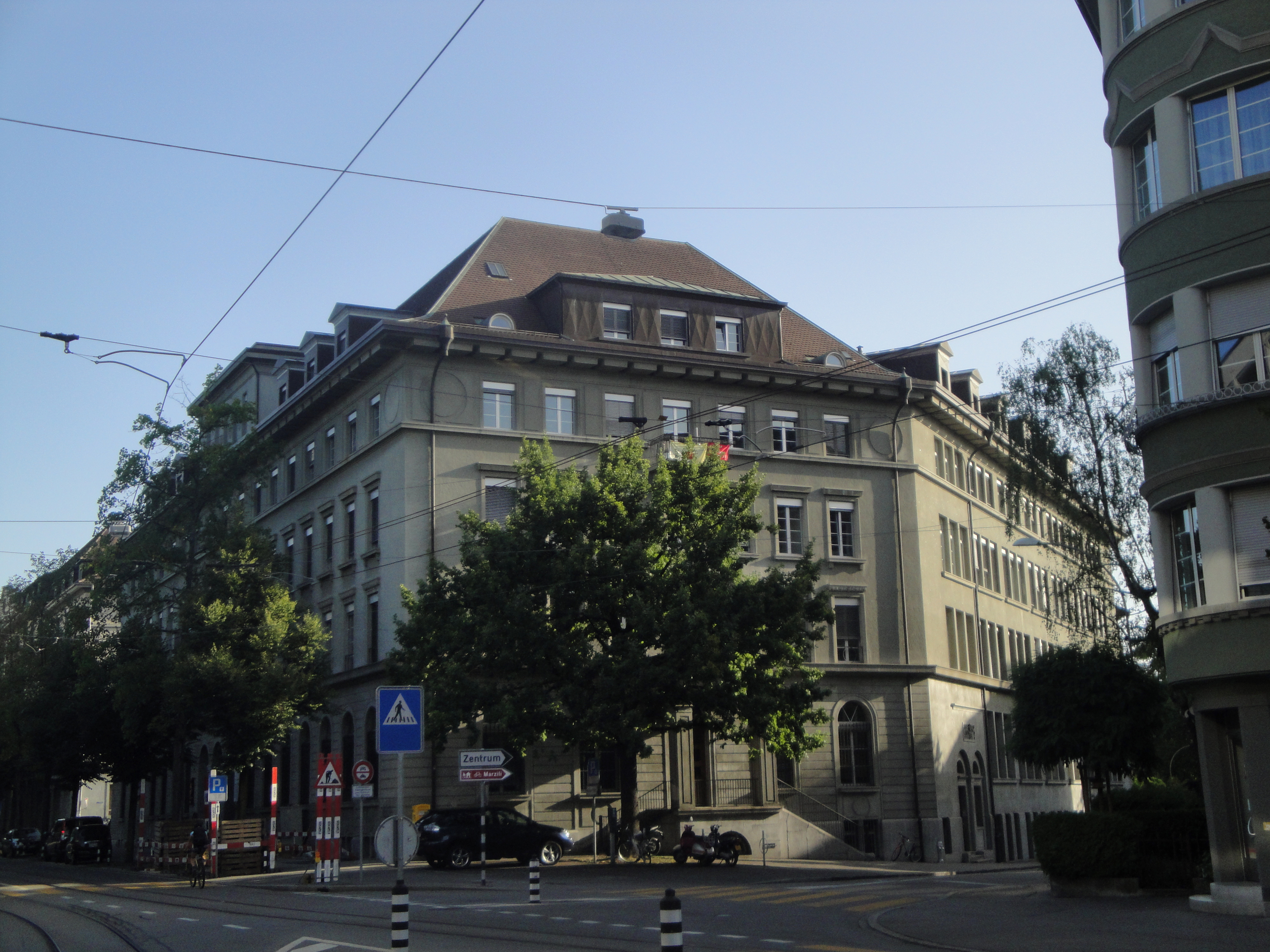
- Headquarters in Bern
- Founded: 1880
- Headquarters: Bern
- Location: Switzerland
- Members: 315,790 (2023)
- Key people: Pierre-Yves Maillard, president
- Affiliations: ITUC, ETUC, TUAC
- Website: www.sgb.ch

The Swiss Trade Union Federation (German: Schweizerischer Gewerkschaftsbund, SGB; French: Union syndicale suisse; Italian: Unione Sindicale Svizzera, USS) is the largest national trade union center in Switzerland.

== History ==
The federation was founded in 1880. The SGB has close ties with the Social Democratic Party of Switzerland (SPS). Ruth Dreifuss, the former President of the Confederation, and former member of the Swiss Federal Council, was previously an SGB official.

== Affiliates ==
=== Current affiliates ===
The following unions are affiliated to the SGB:

Union	Abbreviation	Founded	Membership (2023)
AvenirSocial	AvenirSocial	2005	3,785
Federal Staff Association	PVB	1912	7,378
Garanto	Garanto	2001	2,614
Kapers	Kapers	1971	2,842
Nautilus International	Nautilus	2011	530
New Wood	New Wood	1998	23
Swiss Bank Employees' Union	SBPV	1918	5,691
Swiss Musicians' Union	SMV	1914	1,687
Swiss Music Pedagogic Association	SMPV	1893	2,476
Swiss Union of Mass Media	SSM	1974	2,666
Swiss Union of Public Service Personnel	VPOD	1905	32,037
Syndicom	Syndicom	2010	29,034
Unia	Unia	2004	174,540
Union of Transport Workers	SEV	1919	36,916

=== Former affiliates ===
Union	Abbreviation	Founded	Left	Reason not affiliated	Membership (1954)	Membership (2001)
Association of Swiss Air Traffic Control Personnel	VSFP	1988	1999	Merged into GEKO	N/A	N/A
Comedia	Comedia	1998	2010	Merged into Syndicom	N/A	16,597
Staff Association of the Embroidery Industry			1944	Merged into GTCP	N/A	N/A
Swiss Bookbinders' and Carton Makers' Union	SBKV	1889	1980	Merged into GDP	4,465	N/A
Swiss Choir and Ballet Union					N/A	N/A
Swiss Clothing and Leather Workers' Union		1891	1930	Disaffiliated	N/A	N/A
Swiss Clothing, Leather and Equipment Workers' Union	VBLA	1930	1992	Merged into SMUV	8,248	N/A
Swiss Customs Employees' Union	VSZP	1906	2001	Merged into Garanto	3,464	N/A
Swiss Dental Technicians' Union		1918			N/A	N/A
Swiss Hat and Cap Workers' Union	SHMV	1904	1947	Merged into VBLA	N/A	N/A
Swiss Lithographers' Union	SLB	1888	1998	Merged into Comedia	3,059	N/A
Swiss Metalworkers' and Watchmakers' Union	SMUV	1915	2004	Merged into Unia	115,944	89,907
Swiss Professional Association of Social Work	SBS	1946	2005	Merged into AvenirSocial	N/A	N/A
Swiss Textile Homeworkers' Union		1914	1948	Merged into GTCP	N/A	N/A
Swiss Typographers' Union	STB	1858	1980	Merged into GDP	10,560	N/A
Swiss Union of Silk Bolting Cloth Mill Workers	SVSW	1890	2008	Dissolved	596	256
Swiss Women Workers' Union	SAV	1890	1917	Dissolved	2,250 (1917)	
Union Movement for Labour and Justice	GEWAG		2005	Dissolved	N/A	521
Union of Commerce, Transport and Food	VHTL	1915	2004	Merged into Unia	39,750	16,329
Union of Communication	GEKO	1998	2010	Merged into Syndicom	N/A	38,375
Union of Construction and Industry	GBI	1993	2004	Merged into Unia	N/A	91,276
Union of Construction and Wood	GBH	1922	1993	Merged into GBI	71,813	N/A
Union of Paper and Graphic Assistants of Switzerland		1903	1934		N/A	N/A
Union of Printing and Paper	GDP	1980	1998	Merged into Comedia	N/A	N/A
Union of Swiss Postal Employees	VSPB	1893	1998	Merged into GEKO	5,501	N/A
Union of Swiss Postal, Telegraph and Telephone Personnel	PTT-Union	1891	1998	Merged into GEKO	16,191	N/A
Union of Swiss Telegraph and Telephone Supervisors	VSTTB	1874	1998	Merged into GEKO	2,528	N/A
Union of Textiles, Chemicals and Paper	GTCP	1908	1993	Merged into GBI	26,532	N/A

== Presidents ==
Since 1884, the SGB has had the following 27 presidents, one of which was a woman:

1884: Ludwig Witt
1886: Johann Kappes
1886: Ludwig Witt
1888: Albert Spiess
1888: Georg Preiss
1890: Rudolf Morf
1891: Conrad Conzett
1893: Eduard Hungerbühler
1894: Eduard Keel
1896: Lienhard Boksberger
1898: Alois Kessler
1900: Heinrich Schnetzler
1902: Niklaus Bill
1903: Karl Zingg
1909: Emile Ryser
1912: Oskar Schneeberger
1934: Robert Bratschi
1954: Arthur Steiner
1958: Hermann Leuenberger
1969: Ernst Wüthrich
1973: Ezio Canonica
1978: Richard Müller
1982: Fritz Reimann
1990: Walter Renschler
1994: Christiane Brunner and Vasco Pedrina
1998: Paul Rechsteiner
2019: Pierre-Yves Maillard
