= 2025–2026 German student strikes =

Anti-conscription protests in Germany

School strike against conscription Schulstreik gegen Wehrpflicht
- Part of Gen Z protests and 2026 European unrest
- Banner of alliance "No to conscription"
- Date: 5 December 2025 – present
- Location: Germany
- Caused by: Reintroduction of mandatory registration and mandatory health examination (Musterung) for all candidate male citizens, introduction of demand-based conscription, possible reintroduction of compulsory conscription
- Methods: Demonstrations, strikes, truancy, Student activism, Vandalism
- Status: Ongoing
- Concessions: Suspension of travel-notification requirement

Parties
German student protestors; Political parties and organizations; Die Linke; BSW; German Communist Party; Socialist German Workers Youth; Marxist–Leninist Party of Germany; Jusos; Student unions and councils; DGB-Jugend; Bundesschülerkonferenz; Teacher unions; Gewerkschaft Erziehung und Wissenschaft; Trade unions; IG Metall; ver.di Jugend; Youth organisation of Eisenbahn- und Verkehrsgewerkschaft; Peace organizations; German Peace Society; International Physicians for the Prevention of Nuclear War; Churches; Evangelische Kirche in Mitteldeutschland	Government of Germany; Federal Ministry of Defence; Teacher unions; Deutscher Lehrerverband

Lead figures
	Friedrich Merz; Boris Pistorius

Number
Up to 100,000-120,000	

Casualties
- Fined: Multiple students because of truancy

The German school strikes against conscription (German: Schulstreik gegen Wehrpflicht) is an initiative against a reform, or possible reintroduction, of compulsory military service in Germany as proposed by the federal government of Friedrich Merz. The initiative was launched by decentrally organized students and seeks to invoke a debate and reexamination of compulsory military service, militarization and youth participation in politics through demonstrations and school strikes. The protests were initiatied in the context of the debate around the personnel strength and new modes of conscription for the Bundeswehr. The four organized protests in numerous German cities drew tens of thousand of protestors, mostly belonging to Generation Z.

The school strikes are supported by student councils and unions, trade unions, peace organisations, churches and various groups of the political left. The movement has been criticized by the governing coalition but also some NGOs and unions. Besides that there are many voices that, while not endorsing the campaign, are advocating for dialogue.

== Background ==
Compulsory military service was considered a central part of German military policy since the rearmament in 1955. Following a reform of the Bundeswehr in 2011 by then federal minister of defense Karl-Theodor zu Guttenberg, compulsory conscription was abolished in favour of voluntary conscription.

Due to the Russian invasion of Ukraine, described by German chancellor Olaf Scholz in a speech as "turning point" ("Zeitenwende"), a debate of the state of the Bundeswehr especially regarding personnel strength came back into the focus of German politics. Due to this, the organization "No to conscription" (German: "Nein zur Wehrpflicht") (NZW) was founded by different youth organizations of the left-wing spectrum.

After Union leader Friedrich Merz was elected as chancellor in 2025, plans for a reform of the Bundeswehr gained momentum. On 5 December of 2025, the German Bundestag voted for a law aiming at the modernization of the Bundeswehr, which, from 2026 on, included the model of a "new conscription". According to this conscription, all men aged 18 are obligated to answer a digital questionnaire. In the summer of 2026, the federal defense ministry sent out notifications for mandatory health examinations, even if any forms of military service were denied in the questionnaire. In 2027, comprehensive mandatory health examinations will be envoked. The law also included a clause for demand-based conscription, which means that if the number of volunteers was not enough to fulfill the quota of staffing requirements, the government could draft anyone that answered the questionnaire.

Counseling centers have reported a massive increase in conscientious objections. The youth organization of the German Trade Union Confederation (DGB) openly criticized the proposed modernization in September 2025, calling it preparations for the reactivation of compulsory conscription.

== Chronology of protests ==
=== 2025 ===
Due to the Bundestag vote on 5 December 2025, the first wave of strikes were conducted in hundreds of German cities. According to the organizers up to 40,000 students joined the demonstrations.

=== 2026 ===
On 5 March 2026, more than one hundred demonstrations were held with around 50.000 protestors present, which included parents and teachers.

On 8 April 2026, the federal defense minister Boris Pistorius suspended the notification requirement for men that stay abroad.

Protests in Leipzig on the 8 May 2026

The third nationwide school strike was conducted on 8 May 2026, the Liberation Day (Tag der Befreiung). Again, more than 50,000 students took part in more than 100 of cities.

The fourth school strike was held on 25 September 2026. More than 45,000 young people protested.

On 16 October 2026, up to 300 protestors in Berlin demanded increases in the education budget and proclaimed their solidarity with the French student protests. On October 31st, protests turned violent in some areas, and rioters looted stores and attacked emergency services with Molotov cocktails, according to Frankfurt police.

Up to 100,000-120,000 joined the protests nationwide on oct 31st (according to organisers)

The movement is strongly decentralized and open to anyone opposed to conscription. The protests have been supported by various civil groups, organizations and parties. German newspaper Die Zeit mentions as the supporters of the first protests on 5 December different peace organizations, the teachers union GEW and the left-conservative political party BSW. The chairman of the German socialist party The Left, Jan van Aken, also openly supported the protests. The protests of 5 March saw the youth organisations of various German trade unions like the German Trade Union Confederation, IG Metall, Eisenbahn- und Verkehrsgewerkschaft and Ver.di as well as even parts of the ruling SPD's youth organization Jusos join in.

The Federal Office for the Protection of the Constitution has claimed that many far-left extremist groups have influenced and mobilized for the protests, such as the Socialist German Workers Youth (SDAJ), the youth organisation of the German Communist Party (DKP), or the Marxist-Leninist Party of Germany (MLPD). One of the initiators of the strikes, the student Hannes Kramer, is a member of the SDAJ. Political scientist Thorsten Winkelmann has called the SDAJ the "vanguard" of the protests.

== Reactions ==
The German leftist parties The Left and BSW have openly supported the protests.

Booth of party Die Linke during protests in Tübingen

On the 17 December 2025, the Landtag of Saxony-Anhalt, due to a motion by The Left faction, debated legalizing students not going to school to join the strikes. The factions of CDU, AfD and FDP denounced any truancy.

Representatives of the SPD and Greens have called for dialogue between the protesting students and politicians. Federal Defense Minister Boris Pistorius of the SPD proclaimed his support for the protests, while defending the reforms.

The teachers union Education and Science Workers' Union (GEW) has called for its members to support the protesting students and their worries about militarism, peace and democracy. The union also criticized the increased presence of the Bundeswehr on school grounds, including their recruitment and "one sided security policy representations". On the other hand, the biggest German teachers union, the Deutscher Lehrerverband, has warned students of "disciplinary measures" due to truancy.

The Bundesschülerkonferenz, the federal conference of German student councils, has called for exemptions from the classroom for students that are planning to attend the strikes. Many organizations of the General Student's committee (AStA) have also backed the protests, with the members at some universities even actively aiding the mobilization effort.

The peace and environment officer of the Evangelical Church in Central Germany, Jens Lattke, has welcomed the protests, emphasizing the importance and also the church's role in encouraging the critical thinking of the youth and providing rooms for open discourse. Bishop Friedrich Kramer has put a special emphasis on conscientous objection.

== Criminal consequences ==
During the protests on 5 March 2026 in Berlin, an 18-year-old protestor was investigated by police after holding a sign that said "Merz leck Eier" ("Merz lick balls"). "Merz leck Eier", also in its variation "Mehrzweckeier", is a famous anti-Merz slogan and was seen in many places following the incident.

During the protests on 8 May 2026, a female student was criminally investigated for carrying a sign that said "Friedrich stirb doch selber an der Ostfront!" ("Friedrich go die on the Eastern front yourself"). Legal expert Ronen Steinke said the sign falls under freedom of expression and criticized the action of the police as a "warning to any other protestor" by the police rather than a serious judicial pursuit.

In Baden-Württemberg, some students were fined for missing class due to the strikes. Lawyers criticized the action as disproportionate and "pedagogical bankrupcy".

== See also ==
- Conscription in Germany
- Gen Z Protests
- 2026 European unrest
- 2026 French student protests
