= Christian Götz =

German politician (1940–2000)

- Born: 25 January 1940; Leer, Nazi Germany
- Died: 25 July 2000 (aged 60); Gonesse, France
- Occupation: Trade unionist
- Known for: Supporting the German peace movement

Christian Götz (25 January 1940 – 25 July 2000) was a German trade unionist, politician, and journalist. He was an executive board member of the Trade, Banking and Insurance Union (HBV; now Ver.di) from 1980 to 1992.

== Early life ==
Götz was born on 25 January 1940 in Leer. His father was a lock keeper. He attended schools in Leer and Ostfriesland from 1946 to 1954. He then worked in Leer's local government from 1954 to 1959.

== Career ==
Götz volunteered for the German Trade Union Confederation (DGB) and Young Socialists in the SPD, becoming chairman in 1958 and a federal committee member. He performed military service from 1960 to 1963. He then served as a consultant in the SPD parliament assisted by Fritz Erler. He answered questions about the Bundeswehr's "Inner guidance".

Götz served as Federal Youth Secretary of the Trade, Banking, and Insurance Union in Düsseldorf from 1963 to 1971. He generated controversy within the DGB's Federal Youth Committee because he was a Bundeswehr advocate. At the 3rd Federal Youth Conference in 1968, he strongly supported the union's position on political issues and advocated for more intensive political education work as well as the involvement of youth organizations in trade unions. Götz's political views supported friendly relations between East and West Germany as well as declarations of the Federal Youth Conference against the Vietnam War and Greece's military dictatorship.

From 1972 to 1980, Götz served as a contributing editor and spokesperson. Due to his change of attitude regarding the involvement of former Bundeswehr propaganda in the peace movement, he was criticized by the DGB. He supported the union awarding the "War prize" to writer Heinz Konsalik at the Frankfurt Book Fair. Its alternative award, Peace Prize, was intended to expose peace-threatening content in books while books without peace-threatening tendencies were branded.

Götz then served as a member of the union's main executive board from 1980 to 1992. He was responsible for youth, participation, educational and cultural work, tariff policy in the housing industry and in travel agencies, and other policies. He simultaneously served as a supervisory board member with Horten AG and Xerox and several other companies from 1980 to 1993.

From 1993, Götz worked as a freelance journalist and author for Verband deutscher Schriftstellerinnen und Schriftsteller (VS; English:German Writer's Association). He wrote biographies on former DGB chairman Heinz Oskar Vetter and author Bertha von Suttner. He also published books on socio-political topics and two volumes of aphorisms.

== Death and recognition ==
Götz and his wife, photographer Irene Vogt-Götz, were killed in the crash of Air France Flight 4590 on 25 July 2000 near Paris. The couple were described as "among the most admired couples in the prosperous German city of Dusseldorf" by The Independent. Both had been diagnosed with cancer in the months prior to boarding the aircraft, and were traveling to New York City to board the MS Deutschland cruise liner.

=== Awards ===
- 1993: Order of Merit of the Federal Republic of Germany

== Works and publications ==
- With Heinz Oskar Vetter: Christian Götz befragt den Vorsitzenden des deutschen Gewerkschaftsbundes. Köln 1978, ISBN 3-434-10107-1.
- Nicht Atomwaffen – nicht Völkermord, sondern Abrüstung und Völkerfrieden. In: Friedensbroschüre, Gewerkschafter fordern: Frieden durch Abrüstung. Düsseldorf 1981, ISBN 3-88785-002-5.
- Für eine Wende zur sozialen Demokratie. Einschätzung und Materialien aus gewerkschaftlicher Sicht. Köln 1984, ISBN 3-7609-0885-3.
- Macher und Methoden : Apparate - Funktionäre - Bürger; ein satirisches Lesebuch, Köln 1988, ISBN 3-7663-3134-5
- Bundesrepublik im Widerspruch. Arbeits- und Lesebuch für eine fortschrittliche Gesellschafts- und Gewerkschaftspolitik, Hamburg 1991, VSA-Verlag, ISBN 3-87975-582-5
- Die Rebellin Bertha von Suttner – Botschaften für unsere Zeit. Dortmund 1996, ISBN 3-927658-48-0.

Editorials

- Der ganze Unterschied ist in den Röcken. Frauen, Männer und der ewige Kampf der Geschlechter. Dortmund 1998, ISBN 3-931981-03-7
