= Michael Sommer =

German trade unionist leader (1952–2025)

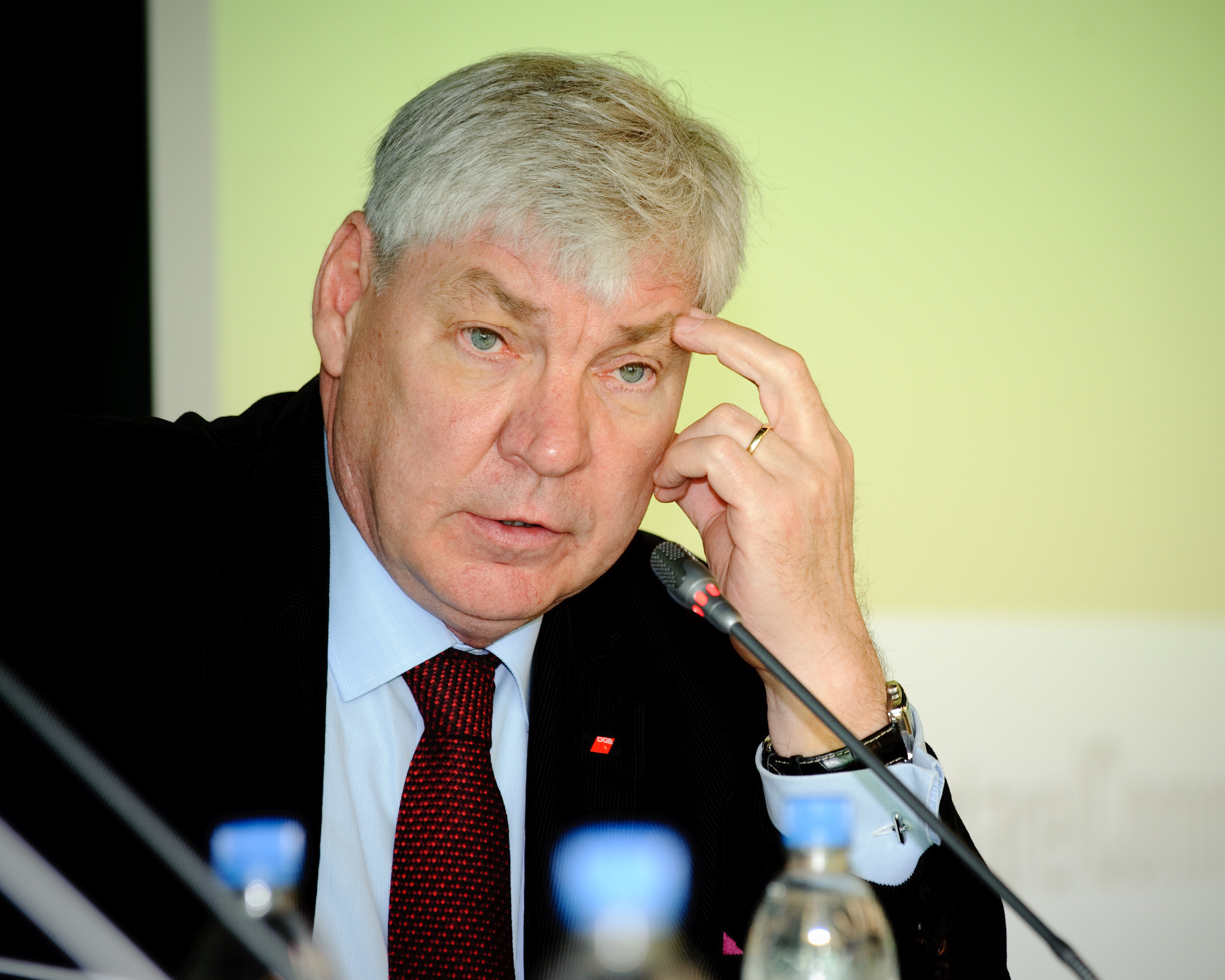
- Born: 15 January 1952; Büderich, North Rhine-Westphalia, West Germany
- Died: 30 June 2025 (aged 73); Berlin, Germany
- Political party: SPD

Michael Sommer (German: [ˈmɪçaʔeːl ˈzɔmɐ]; 15 January 1952 – 30 June 2025) was a German trade unionist leader. He served for 12 years as the chairman of the German Confederation of Trade Unions (DGB).

== Life and career ==
Born in Büderich, now part of Meerbusch, North Rhine-Westphalia, Sommer studied political sciences at Free University of Berlin from 1971 to 1980. His diploma thesis was on the privatization of parcel services which had formerly been part of the state post service. He was a member of the German Post Trade Union, which became part of ver.di in 2001, beginning in 1971. Sommer became a member of the Social Democratic Party in 1981.

After his final degree, Sommer worked for the trade union. He climbed the ladder in the trade union becoming chairman of ver.di on 18 March 2001. A year later, on 28 May 2002, he was elected chairman of the DGB. He served for twelve years, retiring in 2014. In 2010, he was also elected president of the International Trade Union Confederation (ITUC).

Sommer died in Berlin on 30 June 2025, at the age of 73.

== Other activities ==
- Aktion Deutschland Hilft (Germany's Relief Coalition), Member of the Board of Trustees
- Friedrich Ebert Foundation (FES), Deputy Chairman of the Board
- Volkswagen, Member of the Sustainability Council (from 2016)
- Volkswagen Foundation, Member of the Board of Trustees (from 2009)
- Schloss Neuhardenberg Foundation, chairman of the Board of Trustees
- KfW, Member of the supervisory board (2003–2014)

Trade union offices
Preceded by Sharan Burrow	President of the International Trade Union Confederation; 2010–2014	Succeeded by João Antonio Felicio
