= German Trade Union Confederation =

German union federation

DGB
- German Trade Union Confederation
- Deutscher Gewerkschaftsbund
- Predecessor: General German Trade Union Federation
- Founded: 12 October 1949
- Headquarters: Berlin, Germany
- Location: Germany
- Members: 5.4 million (2025)
- Key people: Yasmin Fahimi (SPD), president
- Affiliations: ITUC, ETUC, TUAC
- Website: www.dgb.de

The German Trade Union Confederation (German: Deutscher Gewerkschaftsbund; DGB) is an umbrella organisation (sometimes known as a national trade union center) for eight German trade unions, in total representing more than 5.4 million people (31 December 2025). It was founded in Munich on 12 October 1949.

The DGB coordinates joint demands and activities within the German trade union movement. It represents the member unions in contact with the government authorities, the political parties and the employers' organisations. However, the umbrella organisation is not directly involved in collective bargaining and does not conclude collective labour agreements. The DGB has persistently pushed for codetermination, wherein workers also serve in managerial functions along with the ownership.

Union delegates elect committees for 9 districts, 66 regions and the federal centre. The organisation holds a federal congress every four years. This assembly sets the framework for trade union policies and elects five Federal Executives. Together with the presidents of the member unions they constitute the DGB's executive committee. The members of the executive committee, together with the DGB regional presidents and 70 delegates from the unions, form a Federal Council which meets once a year to make decisions on national issues. The DGB also has a youth organisation, DGB-Jugend.

The DGB has its headquarters in Berlin. It is a member of the European Trade Union Confederation (ETUC) and the International Trade Union Confederation (ITUC).

== History ==
=== Until 1933 ===
As first German confederation of unions at 14 March 1892 the Generalkommission der Gewerkschaften Deutschlands was founded in Halberstadt. It represented 57 national and some local unions with approximate 300,000 people in total. After World War I unions had to reorganise. During a congress in Nuremberg from 30 June until 5 July 1919 the Allgemeiner Deutscher Gewerkschaftsbund (ADGB) was founded as an umbrella organisation of 52 unions with more than 3 million members. The ADGB may be seen as predecessor of today's DGB. Like today, there also existed a conservative counterpart of lesser importance. Curiously, this conservative organisation was named Deutscher Gewerkschaftsbund, DGB. On 2 May 1933 all trade unions were dissolved by the Nazis.

=== 1946–1949 ===
After World War II German unions had to reorganize once again. Various regional and issue-specific unions formed under the Western occupations of Germany.

On 9–11 February 1946 the Freier Deutscher Gewerkschaftsbund (FDGB) was founded in Berlin as a confederation of 15 unions in the Soviet occupation zone.

On 23–25 April 1947 the Deutscher Gewerkschaftsbund, DGB was founded in Bielefeld as a confederation of 12 unions in the Allied-occupied Germany.

Foundations in the American occupation zone:
24/25 August 1946: Freier Gewerkschaftsbund Hessen
30 August – 1 September 1946: Gewerkschaftsbund Württemberg-Baden
27–29 March 1947: Bayerischer Gewerkschaftsbund

Foundations in the French occupation zone:
15/16 February 1947: Gewerkschaftsbund Süd-Württemberg und Hohenzollern
1/2 March 1947: Badischer Gewerkschaftsbund
2 May 1947: Allgemeiner Gewerkschaftsbund Rheinland-Pfalz

On 12–14 October, the 7 umbrella organisation in West Germany merged into the West German DGB as a confederation of 16 single trade unions.

Number of members, 30 June 1949
Allgemeiner Gewerkschaftsbund Rheinland-Pfalz	232,117
Badischer Gewerkschaftsbund	92,257
Bayerischer Gewerkschaftsbund	815,161
DGB of the British zone	2,885,036
Freier Gewerkschaftsbund Hessen	397,008
Gewerkschaftsbund Süd-Württemberg und Hohenzollern	75,502
Gewerkschaftsbund Württemberg-Baden	464,905
Total	4,961,986

=== Reunification–present ===
In 1990, the members of the FDGB of the German Democratic Republic joined the members of the DGB. In recent years, many member unions of the DGB have merged, so today the DGB has only 8 members. This was seen as a progress by many unionists who hoped for stronger representation, while others claim that strong member unions like ver.di with its two million members have considerably weakened the DGB as a roof organization.

In general, the influence of German trade unions has declined since 1990 and had to accept shrinking real incomes and a reform of the welfare system in 2004 ("Hartz IV laws"), which put additional pressure on wages. For some years, the DGB and its member unions have been campaigning for a minimum wage to be introduced in Germany. Well into the 1990s, they had rejected this idea because they got better results from their strong position in the German system of collective bargaining.

== Affiliates ==
=== Today ===
Members of DGB unions 2025
Union		Women		Men		Non-Binary		In total	
IG Bauen-Agrar-Umwelt (Construction, Agriculture, Environment)	IG BAU	53,766	28.79%	132,965	71.21%			186,731	3.44%
IG Bergbau, Chemie, Energie (Mining, Chemicals, Energy)	IG BCE	125,229	22.90%	421,466	77.08%	91	0.02%	546,786	10.07%
Gewerkschaft Erziehung und Wissenschaft (Education and Science)	GEW	197,041	71.77%	76,188	27.75%	1,303	0.48%	274,532	5.05%
IG Metall (Metalworkers)	IGM	369,389	18.33%	1,645,819	81.66%	287	0.01%	2,015,495	37.10%
Gewerkschaft Nahrung-Genuss-Gaststätten (Food, Beverages and Catering)	NGG	70,251	38.65%	111,424	61.30%	90	0.05%	181,765	3.35%
Gewerkschaft der Polizei (Police)	GdP	63,398	29.67%	150,207	70.31%	41	0.02%	213,646	3.93%
Eisenbahn- und Verkehrsgewerkschaft (Railway Workers)	EVG	40,529	22.14%	142,495	77.83%	60	0.03%	183,084	3.37%
Vereinte Dienstleistungsgewerkschaft (United Services Union)	ver.di	953,075	52.07%	877,192	47.93%			1,830,267	33.69%
DGB in total	DGB	1,872,678	34.47%	3,557,756	65.49%	1,872	0.04%	5,432,306	100.00%
1. IG BAU: 186,731 (3.44%); 2. IG BCE: 546,786 (10.1%); 3. GEW: 274,532 (5.05%); 4. IGM: 2,015,495 (37.1%); 5. NGG: 181,765 (3.35%); 6. GdP: 213,646 (3.93%); 7. EVG: 183,084 (3.37%); 8. ver.di: 1,830,267 (33.7%)

=== Former affiliates ===
Union	Acronym	Year merged	Merged into
German Railwaymen's Federation	GdED	2010	EVG
Textile and Clothing Union	GTB	1998	IGM
Wood and Plastic Union	GHK	2000	IGM
Building and Construction Union	IG BSE	1996	IG BAU
Horticulture, Agriculture and Forestry Union	GGLF	1996	IG BAU
Union of Mining and Energy	IG BE	1997	IG BCE
Chemical, Paper and Ceramic Union	IG Chemie	1997	IG BCE
Leather Union	GL	1997	IG BCE
German Postal Union	DPG	2001	Ver.di
Trade, Banking and Insurance Union	HBV	2001	Ver.di
Public Services, Transport and Traffic Union	ÖTV	2001	Ver.di
Printing and Paper Union	DruPa	1989	IG Medien
Arts Union	Kunst	1989	IG Medien
Media Union	IG Medien	2001	Ver.di

=== Other unions ===
In 1978 the Gewerkschaft der Polizei (GdP, see above) joined the DGB as 17th union.

The Deutsche Angestellten Gewerkschaft – DAG – was a large white collar trade union. Although the DAG in the British zone 1946 was a member of the DGB in the British zone, the West German DAG never joined the West German DGB as a single member union. In 2001 the DAG merged with four existing DGB unions to become the new DGB union Ver.di.

The railway union Verkehrsgewerkschaft GDBA was a member of the other labour federation, the German Civil Service Federation. In 2010 the GDBA merged with existing DGB union TRANSNET to form the new DGB union EVG.

== Presidents ==
1949: Hans Böckler
1951: Christian Fette
1952: Walter Freitag
1956: Willi Richter
1962: Ludwig Rosenberg
1969: Heinz Oskar Vetter
1982: Ernst Breit
1990: Heinz-Werner Meyer
1994: Dieter Schulte
2002: Michael Sommer
2014: Reiner Hoffmann
2022: Yasmin Fahimi

== Structure ==
=== districts with regions ===
- Baden-Württemberg: 4 regions
- Bayern: 14 regions
- Berlin/Brandenburg: 4 regions
- Hessen/Thüringen: 6 regions
- Niedersachsen/Bremen/Sachsen-Anhalt: 10 regions
- Nord (Niedersachsen/Bremen/Sachsen-Anhalt): 7 regions
- Nordrhein-Westfalen: 11 regions
- Sachsen: 4 regions
- West (Rheinland-Pfalz/Saarland): 6 regions

== See also ==
- List of labor unions
- Hans Böckler - first president of the confederation

== Literature ==
- ICTUR; et al., eds. (2005). Trade Unions of the World (6th ed.). London, UK: John Harper Publishing. ISBN 0-9543811-5-7.
- F.Deppe/G.Fülberth/H.J.Harrer: Geschichte der deutschen Gewerkschaftsbewegung ISBN 3-7609-0290-1
- http://www.dgb.de/uber-uns/dgb-heute/
