= Postal, Telegraph and Telephone International =

Former global union federation (1920–1999)

- Internationale du personnel des postes, telegraphes et telephones
- Merged into: Union Network International
- Founded: 1920
- Dissolved: 31 December 1999
- Headquarters: 36 avenue du Lignon, Geneva, Switzerland
- Members: 4 million (1994)
- Publication: PTTI News
- Website: ptti.ch

The Postal, Telegraph and Telephone International (PTTI) was a global union federation bringing together unions of communications workers worldwide.

== History ==
While a meeting of unions of communication workers was held in Paris in 1911, no lasting organisation was established until 1920, when the PTTI was founded at a meeting in Milan. Initially, the federation consisted entirely of European unions, but after World War II, it expanded worldwide, and by 1994 had four million members from every continent except Antarctica.

By 1997, new forms of communication had grown in importance, and the federation renamed itself as the Communications International. At the end of 1999, it merged with the International Federation of Commercial, Clerical, Professional and Technical Employees, the International Graphical Federation, and the Media and Entertainment International, to form Union Network International.

== Affiliates ==
In 1998, the following unions were affiliated to the PTTI:

Union	Country	Affiliated membership
AbvaKabo	Netherlands	25481
All Ceylon Telecom Services Union	Sri Lanka	1817
All Japan Postal Labour Union	Japan	75000
All Pakistan RMS Employees Union (Central)	Pakistan	2000
American Postal Workers Union	United States	244000
Antigua Workers' Union	Antigua	500
Asociación Salvadoreña de Trabajadores de la Administración Nacional de Telecomunicaciones	El Salvador	1000
Bahamas Communications & Public Officers' Union	Bahamas	1123
Bahamas Communications and Public Managers Union	Bahamas	258
Bahamas Public Services Union	Bahamas	400
Bangladesh Post Office Union	Bangladesh	2000
Bangladesh Postmen and Lower Grade Staff Union	Bangladesh	30000
Bangladesh T&T Employees' & Workers' Ideal Federal Union	Bangladesh	5328
Bangladesh Telezogazoge Sramik Karmachari Parishad	Bangladesh	7968
Barbados Workers' Union	Barbados	1200
Belize Telecommunication Workers Union	Belize	209
Bermuda Industrial Union	Bermuda	298
Bermuda Public Services Association	Bermuda	331
Botswana Postal Services Workers' Union	Botswana	379
Botswana Telecommunications Employees Union	Botswana	907
Buklod ng Manggagawa sa RCPI National Federation of Labour	Philippines	1040
Cable & Wireless (HK) Ltd Staff Association	Hong Kong	1027
Canadian Union of Postal Workers	Canada	44890
Centrale Générale des Services Publics Secteur Postes	Belgium	14940
Centrale Générale des Services Publics Secteur Télécom	Belgium	8600
Chinese Federation of Postal Workers	Taiwan	26814
Chinese Telecommunication Workers' Union	Taiwan	17500
Civil and Public Services Union	Ireland	1700
Clerical and Commercial Workers' Union	Guyana	100
Comité Nacional Unico de Telecomunicaciones del Ecuador	Ecuador	3000
Commercial, Technical & Allied Workers' Union	St Vincent	220
Communication & Public Sector Union	Australia	13802
Communication and Transport Workers Union	Tanzania	6500
Communications, Electrical and Plumbing Union of Australia	Australia	68640
Communication Managers' Association	United Kingdom	13999
Communication Managers' Union	Ireland	1025
Communication Workers of the Philippines	Philippines	15300
Communication Workers' Union	Ireland	16100
Communications, Energy and Paperworkers Union of Canada	Canada	22290
Communications Workers of America	United States	400000
Communication Workers Union	South Africa	40000
Communication Workers Union	Trinidad and Tobago	1785
Communication Workers Union	United Kingdom	274820
Communications Workers' Union	Ghana	5000
Confederación Sindical de Trabajadores en Radio y TV de Bolivia	Bolivia	1100
Cyprus-Turkish Telecommunications Employees Union	Cyprus	275
Danish General Workers' Union	Denmark	6309
Dansk Post- og Giroforening	Denmark	5199
Danish Postal Union	Denmark	11764
Eastern Telecom Employees Union	Philippines	Unknown
EBS Werknemers Organisatie " OWOS"	Surinam	500
Estonian Post and Telecommunciations Workers Trade Union	Estonia	4642
Facket för Service och Kommunikation	Sweden	58520
Federação Interestadual dos Empregados da Empresa Brasileira de Correios e Telégrafos e Similares de Comunicaçôes dos Estados de São Paulo, Minas Gerais e Bahia	Brazil	630
Federação Nacional dos Trabalhadores em Empresas de Radiodifusão e Televisão	Brazil	15000
Federação Nacional dos Trabalhadores em Empresas de Telecomunicações e Operadores de Mesas Telefonicas	Brazil	5400
Federación Argentina de Trabajadores de Luz y Fuerza	Argentina	32000
Federación de Comunicación y Transporte	Spain	10224
Federación de Obreros y Empleados de Correos y Telecomunicaciones	Argentina	25000
Federación de Obreros y Especialistas y Empleados de los Servicios e Industria de las Telecomunicaciones	Argentina	23000
Federacion de Trabajadores de Comunicaciones Eléctricas y Afines de Panama	Panama	1300
Federación de Trabajadores de la cpt-Telefonica del Peru	Peru	1500
Federación de Trabajadores de Telecomunicaciones de Venezuela	Venezuela	13000
Federación de Trabajadores Telefonicos de Cuba en el Exilio	Cuba	1605
Federación Enrique Schmidt Cuadra	Nicaragua	2000
Federación Nacional de Empleados de Comunicaciones Eléctrico-Postales	Costa Rica	3486
Federación Nacional de Empleados y Trabajadores Postales del Ecuador	Ecuador	750
Federación Nacional de Sindicatos de la Compañía de Teléfonos de Chile	Chile	5100
Federación Nacional de Trabajadores de AASANA	Bolivia	1000
Federacion Nacional de Trabajadores de Electricidad del Perú	Peru	800
Federación Nacional de Trabajadores de Luz, Fuerza y Telefonos	Bolivia	1000
Federación Nacional de Trabajadores de Radio, Teatro, Cine y Televisión y Afines de Venezuela	Venezuela	2943
Federación Nacional de Trabajadores Eléctricos y Afines de Chile	Chile	3200
Federación Nacional de Trabajadores Postales de Bolivia	Bolivia	1200
Federación Sindical de Trabajadores de la Empresa ENTEL Bolivia	Bolivia	1800
Federacion Uruguaya de Funcionarios Postales	Uruguay	800
Fédération Démocratique Unifiée des Travailleurs des PTT - CFDT	France	41790
Fédération des Employés des Postes Helléniques	Greece	7000
Fédération des PTT "Podkrepa"	Bulgaria	2000
Fédération des Syndicats de la "Poste Roumaine"	Romania	10500
Fédération des Syndicats Rom Télécom	Romania	18000
Fédération Nationale des Postes et Télécommunications	Mauritania	400
Fédération Nationale des Postes et Télécommunications - UMT	Morocco	8000
Federation of National Postal Organisations	India	125000
Federation of National Telecommunications Organisations	India	100000
Federation of Semi-Government Employees	Cyprus	850
Federation of Telecommunications, Electronic Information and Allied Workers	Japan	30000
Federation of Workers in Greek Telecommunications	Greece	20007
Fédération syndicale nationale des PTT	Guinea	1000
Fédération Syndicaliste des Facteurs des Postes et Télécommunications du Grand-Duché du Luxembourg	Luxemburg	1225
Federazione Italiana Sindacati Telecomunicazioni	Italy	10000
Félag Islanzkra Simamanna	Iceland	854
FETRA-TV	Chile	1500
Fiji Post and Telecoms Employees Association	Fiji	1144
Fiji Public Service Association	Fiji	200
Free Pancyprian Organisation of Telecommunications Employees	Cyprus	1800
General Trade Union of Communication Workers	Egypt	60000
General Trade Union of Postal Workers	Egypt	2500
General Trade Union of PTT Workers	Sudan	8818
General Workers' Union	Malta	1690
German Postal Union	Germany	479418
Ghana Electronic Servicing Technicians Association	Ghana	1200
Government Servants' Association	Mauritius	700
Grenada Technical & Allied Workers' Union	Grenada	316
Guyana Public Service Union	Guyana	580
Haber-is Sendikasi	Turkey	4500
Handels- og Kontorfunktionaerernes Forbund i Danmark	Denmark	1585
Hong Kong Telephone Co. Ltd Staff Association	Hong Kong	2401
Hungarian Union of Telecommunications Sector	Hungary	8613
Italian Union of Postal Workers	Italy	13000
Italian Union of Communication Workers	Italy	5300
Japan Postal Workers' Union	Japan	150000
Japan Telecommunications Workers' Union	Japan	208000
Kokusai Denshin Denwa Workers' Union	Japan	3900
Kommunikasjons- og Teletilsattes Landsforbund	Norway	2515
Korean Communications Workers' Union	South Korea	26804
Korean Federation of Communications Trade Unions	South Korea	2950
Korean Telecommunications Trade Union	South Korea	45000
Lithuanian Communication Workers Trade Union	Lithuania	9200
Metalworkers' Union	Finland	2100
Mongolian Postal Workers Union	Mongolia	350
Montserrat Allied Workers' Union	Montserrat	221
National Association of Letter Carriers	United States	200000
National Organisation of Postal Employees	Pakistan	12000
National Postal Mail Handlers Union	United States	47450
National Union of Communication Workers	Zambia	5000
National Union of Government Employees, PTT Section	Israel	10000
National Union of P & T Employees	Nigeria	20000
National Union of Public Workers	Barbados	250
National Union of Telecoms Employees	Malaysia	12000
Nepal Telecommunication Corporation Workers Union	Nepal	2208
Norwegian Post Organisation	Norway	11274
Norwegian Telecommunication and Data Workers' Union	Norway	10587
Norwegian Union of Postmen	Norway	12865
NZ Engineering Printing and Manufacturing Union	New Zealand	5000
Oversesas Telecoms Employees Union	Sri Lanka	190
Pakistan Telecommunication Staff Union	Pakistan	6000
Pakistan Telecommunication Union	Pakistan	4563
Papua New Guinea Post and Telecommunication Workers Union	New Guinea	1600
Personalverband der Bundesverwaltung	Switzerland	1390
Philcom Employees Union	Philippines	171
Pos Malaysia Berhad Clerical Staff Union, Sarawak	Malaysia	260
Post and Telecommunication Workers Trade Union	Latvia	11300
Post Office Administrative Staff Association	Mauritius	60
Postal Employees Union of the Philippines	Philippines	250
Postal Officers' Union	Finland	5437
Postal Trade Union	Hungary	24300
Postal Union	Finland	19133
Postal Workers' Association	Philippines	5000
Póstmannafélag Islands	Iceland	1002
Precision Electrical and Related Equipment Senior Staff Association	Nigeria	404
Public Employees Association of Papua New Guinea	Papua New Guinea	884
Public Service Association of Western Samoa	Western Samoa	116
Public Service Executive Union	Ireland	600
Public Service Union of Belize	Belize	90
Radio Nepal Employees Association	Nepal	272
Schweizerischer Posthalterverband	Switzerland	2484
Sekretariat Lacznosci - Solidarnosc	Poland	19000
Senior Staff Association of Statutory Corporations and Government-Owned Companies	Nigeria	5020
Sierra Leone Postal Services Ltd. Senior Staff Association	Sierra Leone	45
Sierra Leone Union of Postal & Telecommunications Employees	Sierra Leone	1300
Communication Workers' Union	Italy	25500
Union of Postal Workers	Italy	60000
Sindicato Argentino de Televisión	Argentina	3616
Sindicato de Correos, Telégrafos y Caja Postal	Spain	11000
Sindicato de Funcionarios Postales del Paraguay	Paraguay	435
Sindicato de la Industria Eléctrica de El Salvador	El Salvador	562
Sindicato de Luz y Fuerza de la República de Guatemala	Guatemala	800
Sindicato de Telefonistas de la República Mexicana	Mexico	44000
Sindicato de Teléfonos - UGT	Spain	14225
Sindicato de Trabajadores de Correos	Guatemala	1200
Sindicato de Trabajadores de la Administración Nacional de Electricidad	Paraguay	400
Sindicato de Trabajadores de la Empresa Guatemalteca de Telecomunicaciones	Guatemala	1000
Sindicato de Trabajadores de Telecomunicaciones	Paraguay	2700
Sindicato de Trabajadores de Telecomunicaciones de Honduras	Honduras	3000
Sindicato de Trabajadores del Instituto de Recursos Hidraúlicos y Electrificación	Panama	3700
Sindicato de Trabajadores del Servicio Postal de Honduras	Honduras	700
Sindicato Democratico dos Trabalhadores das Telecomunicaçôes e Correios	Portugal	6037
Sindicato dos Correios e Telecomunicações de São Tomé e Príncipe	São Tomé and Principe	131
Sindicato dos Electricitarios de Sao Paulo	Brazil	25000
Sindicato dos Trabalhadores de aviacao Civil, Correios e Comunicacoes	Mozambique	257
Sindicato dos Trabalhadores em Empresas de Telecomunicações e Operadores de Mesas Telefónicas no Estado de São Paulo	Brazil	9736
Sindicato dos Transportes Comunicações e Turismo	Cape Verde	442
Sindicato Interempresa Nacional de Trabajadores de ENDESA y filiales	Chile	2560
Sindicato Nacional de Trabajadores de de la Radio y la Televisión	Paraguay	1250
Sindicato Nacional de Trabajadores de la Empresa de Correos de Chile	Chile	4089
Sindicato Nacional de Trabajadores del Servicio Postal Mexicano	Mexico	5100
Sindicato Nacional de Trabajadores Postales SINTRAPOSTAL	Colombia	2300
Sindicato Nacional dos Trabalhadores das Telecomunicaçoes e audiovisual	Portugal	7490
Sindicato Nacional dos Trabalhadores dos Transportes e Comunicações	Guinea-Bissau	436
Sindicato Nacional Interempresa de la Empresa Telex-Chile y Filiales	Chile	1150
Sindicato Unico de Trabajadores de la Compania Peruana de Radiodifusion	Peru	200
Sindikata e e Punonjesve Poste-Telecom	Albania	2017
Sindikato di Trahadonan den Telekomunikashon di Korsou	Curacao	410
Sociedad Unión de Carteros y Empleados Postales de El Salvador	El Salvador	70
Society of Telecom Executives	United Kingdom	17430
Solidaridad de Trabajadores Vascos	Spain	500
St. Vincent and the Grenadines Public Service Union	St Vincent	46
Statstjänstemannaförbundet	Sweden	10050
Steel and Engineering Workers' Union of Nigeria	Nigeria	1500
Svenska Industritjänstemannaförbundet	Sweden	11236
Swaziland P&T Workers' Union	Swaziland	568
Swedish Federation of Lawyers, Social Scientists & Economists	Sweden	1100
Syndicat Autonome des Postes	Central African Republic	727
Syndicat Autonome du Personnel de la SOCATEL	Central African Republic	550
Syndicat des Agents des Postes	Rwanda	300
Syndicat des Agents des Télécommunications	Rwanda	600
Syndicat des P & T	Luxemburg	995
Syndicat des Télécommunications du Sénégal	Senegal	1004
Syndicat des Travailleurs de l'Audio-Visuel du Bénin	Benin	300
Syndicat des Travailleurs des Postes et Télécommunications	Burundi	750
Syndicat libre des Travailleurs des Secteurs des Postes et Télécommunications du Congo	Republic of the Congo	800
Syndicat National des Postes et Télecommunications	Côte d'Ivoire	2298
Syndicat National des Postes et Télécommunications	Mauritania	400
Syndicat National des Postes et Télécommunications	Burkina Faso	700
Syndicat National des Postes et Télécommunications	Gabon	1500
Syndicat National des Postes et Télécommunications	Benin	1540
Syndicat National des Postes et Télécommunications et TIM	Mali	1926
Syndicat National des Postes, Télécommunications et des Télécommunications Internationales	Chad	500
Syndicat National des Télécommunications	Chad	300
Syndicat National des Travailleurs des Postes et des Télécommunications	Senegal	2800
Syndicat National des Travailleurs des Postes et Télécommunications du Niger	Niger	490
Telecommunication Officers' Union	Sri Lanka	700
Telecommunication Workers' Union	Mauritius	517
Telecommunications Employees' Association	Fiji	219
Telecommunications Workers Union	Canada	10695
Telegraaf en Telefoon Werknemers Organisatie Suriname	Surinam	1050
Telecommunications Union	Denmark	11477
Telephone Organisation of Thailand State Enterprise Employees Association	Thailand	9545
Telephone Shilpa Sangstha Workers and Employees Union	Bangladesh	550
The Guyana Postal & Telecommunication Workers’ Union	Guyana	1080
The St Lucia Civil Service Association	St Lucia	350
The State Enterprise Association of the Communication Authority of Thailand	Thailand	7000
The Telephone Industries of Pakistan and Workers Federation	Pakistan	2600
Trade Union Federation of PTT Workers	France	45182
Trinidad and Tobago Postal Workers Union	Trinidad and Tobago	780
Uganda Posts & Telecommunications Employees' Union	Uganda	2000
Unie van Werknemers in het Water, Gas- en Electriciteitsbedrijf	Curacao	400
Union Nationale des Travailleurs du Zaïre Fédération Nationale des PTT	Democratic Republic of the Congo	7500
Union of Communication Workers	Slovakia	22083
Union of Communication Workers	Czech Republic	51700
Union of Hong Kong Post Office Employees	Hong Kong	1380
Union of Pos Malaysia Berhad Clerical Workers	Malaysia	3243
Union of Post & Telecommunication Officers	Sri Lanka	4678
Union of Post Office Workers	Mauritius	163
Union of Postal Communications Employees	Canada	2554
Union of Postal and Telecommunications Workers	Austria	43800
Union of Postal Employees PASYDY	Cyprus	350
Union of Postal Uniformed Staff	Malaysia	4504
Union of Postal Uniformed Staff Sarawak	Malaysia	289
Union of Posts & Telecommunications Employees	Kenya	9999
Union of Sabah Postal Uniformed Staff	Malaysia	123
Union of Swiss Postal Employees	Switzerland	5318
Union of Swiss Postal, Telegraph and Telephone Personnel	Switzerland	20855
Union of Swiss Telegraph and Telephone Supervisors	Switzerland	4017
Union of Telecoms Employees (Sarawak)	Malaysia	1950
Union of Telecoms Employees of Singapore	Singapore	6059
Waterfront and Allied Workers' Union	Dominica	95
Zimbabwe Posts and Telecommunications Workers' Union	Zimbabwe	6703

== Leadership ==
=== General Secretaries ===
1911: Felix Koch
1919: Ludwig Maier
1936: Franz Rohner
1940: Fritz Gmür
1965: Stefan Nedzynski
1989: Philip Bowyer

=== Presidents ===
1920: John William Bowen
1949: Charles Geddes
1957: William Norton
1960: Carl Stenger
1966: Ron Smith
1967: Charles Delacourt-Smith
1969: Joseph A. Beirne
1974: Ivan Reddish
1979: Ernst Breit
1984: Glenn Watts
1985: Akira Yamagishi
1990: Curt Persson
1997: Kurt van Haaren
