= Heinz-Werner Meyer =

German trade union leader and politician

Heinz-Werner Meyer (24 August 1932 – 9 May 1994) was a German trade union leader and politician.

Born in the Harburg area of Hamburg, Meyer became a coal miner, while attending night school. He joined the Union of Mining and Energy (IG BE), and also the Social Democratic Party of Germany (SPD). From 1955, he studied economics at the Academy of Economics and Politics, then in 1957 he became the IG BE's full-time youth secretary.

Meyer's rise in the union continued, as in 1964 he was appointed as head of its organisation department, and in 1969 he won election to its executive. From 1975 to 1985, he also served in the Landtag of North Rhine-Westphalia. In 1984 he became vice president of IG BE, and then in 1985 the president of the union. In 1987, he was elected to serve in the Bundestag, standing down in 1990, when he was elected as president of the German Trade Union Confederation. He remained in post until his death, in 1994.

Trade union offices
Preceded by Hans Alker	Vice President of the Union of Mining and Energy; 1984–1985	Succeeded by Walter Beer
Preceded by Adolf Schmidt	President of the Union of Mining and Energy; 1985–1990	Succeeded by Hans Berger
Preceded by Ernst Breit	President of the German Trade Union Confederation; 1990–1994	Succeeded by Dieter Schulte
