= Jugend =

Jugend (from the German for 'youth') may refer to:

- Jugend (magazine), an influential German art magazine published 1896–1940
  - Jugendstil, an artistic movement associated with the magazine
- Jugend (play), an 1893 play by Max Halbe
- Youth (1922 film), or Jugend, a 1922 film directed by Fred Sauer
- Youth (1938 film), or Jugend, a 1938 film directed by Veit Harlan
- Hitler Jugend, the youth organization of the Nazi Party
- Jugend haircut, a hair style
- ver.di Jugend, youth organization
