= Ferlemann =

Ferlemann is a surname. Notable people with the surname include:

- Enak Ferlemann (born 1963), German politician
- Erwin Ferlemann (1930–2000), German trade unionist
