= Kurt van Haaren =

German trade union leader

Kurt van Haaren (19 July 1938 – 13 July 2005) was a German trade union leader.

Born in Emmerich, van Haaren attended the Dortmund Social Academy, then began working for the Deutsche Bundespost, delivering mail. He joined the German Postal Union (DPG), and then in 1964 began working full-time for the union, as its Düsseldorf district secretary. In 1968, he became a financial secretary for the union in Frankfurt, and was also elected to the DPG's executive committee. From 1970, his work focused on employment law reform, and then from 1975, he was the union's lead on working conditions.

In 1982, van Haaren was elected as president of the DPG, without facing an opponent. Under his leadership, the Bundespost was split up, and then privatised. He opposed the privatisation, then focused on avoiding redundancies during the process.

Van Haaren was elected as the last president of the Communications International, and then served on an interim basis as the first president of its successor, the UNI Global Union. He supported the merger of the DPG into the new ver.di union, which took place in 2001. He then retired, and dedicated his time to the German-Polish Society in Bremen.

Trade union offices
Preceded by Ernst Breit	President of the German Postal Union; 1982–2001	Succeeded by Union merged
Preceded by Curt Persson	President of the Communications International; 1997–1999	Succeeded by Union merged
Preceded by New position	President of the UNI Global Union; 2000–2001	Succeeded by Maj-Len Remahl
