= Lea Manti =

German artistic whistler and theatre director

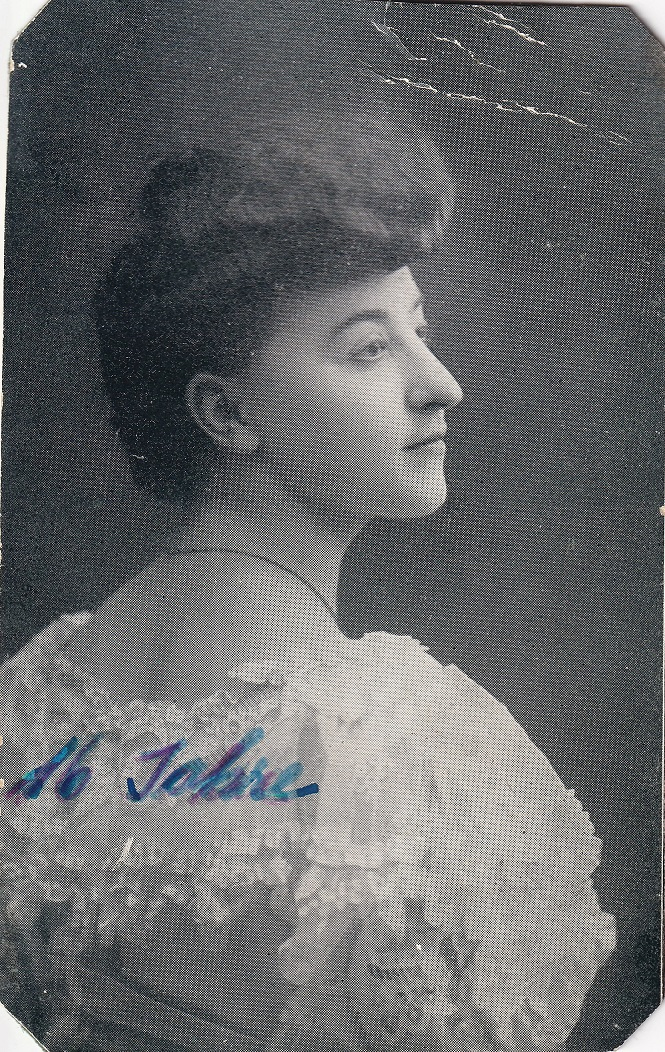
- Manti in 1902
- Born: Marta Mandt (Note: Alternative spelling Martha is also used); 13 August 1886; Elberfeld, Prussia, North German Confederation
- Died: 12 July 1960 (aged 73); Hamburg, West Germany
- Occupations: Artistic whistler; theatre director
- Years active: 1903–1960

Marta Mandt, better known as Lea Manti (13 August 1886 – 12 July 1960), was a German artistic whistler and theatre director.

== Early life ==
Marta Mandt was born on 13 August 1886, in Elberfeld, now part of Wuppertal, the daughter of the Protestant bookbinder Franz Martin Mandt (1848 – after 1923) and his wife Mathilde (née Sebastian; 1854–1897). She had a twin sister, Maria, and at least three other sisters and two brothers: Caroline Ottilie (1874–1919), Anna (1875–1964), Martin Wilhelm (1878–?), Franz Hermann (1890–1942), and Mathilde Caroline Mandt (1892–1982). Her great-uncle, Martin Wilhelm von Mandt (1799–1858), was the personal physician of Tsar Nicholas I. In the early 1890s, her father was temporarily unemployed, and in 1896, her parents were listed with different addresses. Her father had stayed in Elberfeld in the summer of 1895 "in the city's shelter" and was wanted on a warrant for embezzlement. The warrant was only withdrawn by the district court three months later. Her mother died in 1897, when Martha Mandt was eleven years old. The following year, her father remarried Wilhelmine Kepper (born 1843). Martha Mandt grew up in Elberfeld, Barmen, and Düsseldorf, where she also learned to whistle and adopted the stage name "Lea Manti".

== Whistler ==
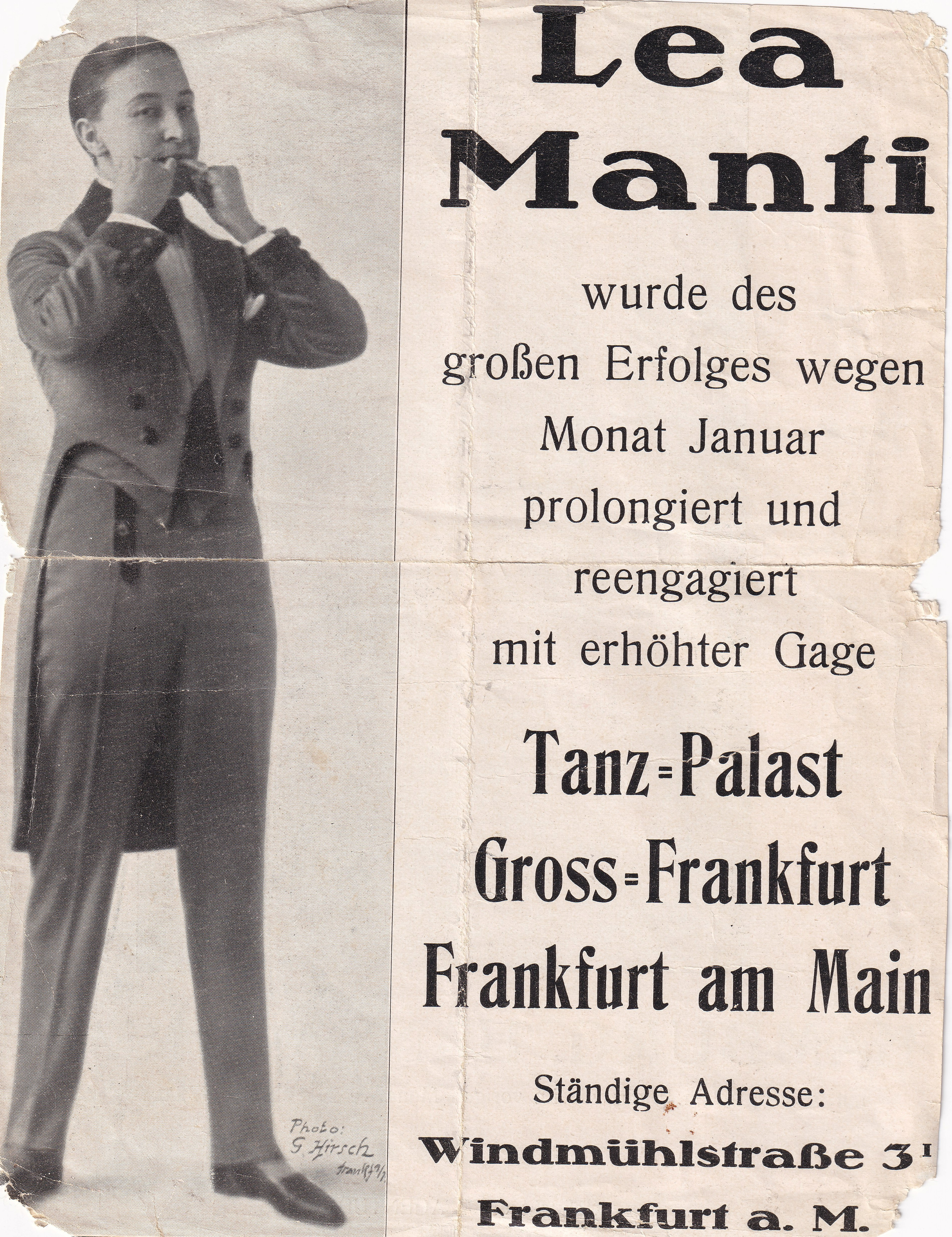
Promotional flyer of Manti, 1920

According to her own account, Lea Manti began her career in 1903. Her first documented performance as an artist whistler was in March 1911 at the Théâtre Variété in Prague. Her first radio broadcast was on 13 January 1928. Her career can be traced through mentions in newspaper advertisements until 1943. Her last known performance was on 31 January 1943, at the Café Zentral-Palast in Vienna-Mariahilf.

Many artistic whistlers whistled with pursed lips. Lea Manti, however, used her fingers, and since she used no other instrument, she was considered a "natural artistic whistler". She whistled catchy melodies seemingly effortlessly. She even performed opera arias and demanding concert pieces in this way. Her repertoire included pieces from Richard Wagner's opera Tannhäuser, the song Yours Is My Heart Alone from Franz Lehár's The Land of Smiles, and a waltz from Jean Gilbert's Die keusche Susanne, as well as Charles Gounod's Ave Maria and many others. Manti confidently referred to herself as a "whistle virtuoso". Her special talent was to whistle a piece after hearing it once or twice. She reportedly whistled with a pleasantly low tone.

Lea Manti chose an elegant, deep purple tailcoat for her stage attire, and she wore her hair short, usually pulled back and close to her body. She defied easy categorization for many who wrote about her; she was small and thin, and her clothing was daring. She was disparagingly described as "the graceful 'master'". It was also said of her that she was a person "who doesn't give a damn about women's clothing, or even about little fingers".

In 1911, she joined the International Artists' Lodge and performed extensively in cabarets large and small in Germany, on the European mainland, in the United Kingdom, South Africa, and the United States. During the German Empire, the Weimar Republic, and Nazi Germany, Lea Manti was a world-renowned and successful star as an artistic whistler.

In a short profile published in the late 1920s, it was said of Manti: "Just as in earlier times, she still has that wonderfully soft, bell-like piano in her whistling, and yet she can overpower a full military band of 60 men. Anyone who has not witnessed this fact can hardly comprehend it of this small, delicate, almost boyishly slender woman, who, besides her art, is also the focus of another interest. Countless bets have already been placed, since no one suspected a woman in this slender, elegant fellow in a lilac-blue or brown tailcoat. One says: 'That's not a woman, that's a man!' Another says: 'No woman can whistle like that!' And so bets upon bets were made, and interest in this woman as a person and as an artist grew and grew".

== Theatre director ==
Lea Manti spent extended periods in Frankfurt am Main, with interruptions, between 1916 and 1926. Her younger sister, Mathilde Caroline Mandt, also lived there until 1955. In April and December 1916, she performed at the Theatre "Groß-Frankfurt" (near the Eschenheimer Tor), and in September 1917 and October 1918, at the "Kristall-Palast". There, she made contact with the New York-born theatre director Leo Lowry (1867–1918). Lowry managed several theaters in Frankfurt and was planning further new buildings. From about 1913, he ran the "Arkadia-Tanz-Palast" at Kaiserstraße 69. He was married to Violet G. Lowry (née Bennet; 1875–1951). After his early death in June 1918, Lea Manti performed at the "Arkadia" at the end of 1918, and Lowry's widow made her her business partner. Manti took over the artistic direction of "Arkadia's Künstlerspiele" in December 1918. At the beginning of 1919, the theatre also opened in the afternoons and hosted "Lea Manti's Elite Tea". In 1920, Violet Lowry and Lea Manti joined forces to form the "Lowry-Manti Theatre Management", and Manti moved into Lowry's apartment. They renamed the Künstlerspiele "Lea Manti's Künstlerspiele" and, starting in July 1920, hosted events at "Manti's Wine Restaurant". Later, these became the "Frankfurter Künstlerspiele", and Manti purchased the "Jorich'schen Spiele" from the variety theatre director Paul Jorich. She ceremoniously reopened them on 1 February 1922, as "Lea Manti's Bonbonnière". Max Ehrlich was also engaged by her in Frankfurt.

In 1922, Violet Lowry returned to the United States. This likely led to the dissolution of the "Lowry-Manti Theatre Management" in Frankfurt. Lea Manti visited Violet Lowry in the States from 1923 to 1924 and was engaged there for various performances as an artist whistler. After her return, Manti went on tour again.

=== Hamburg ===
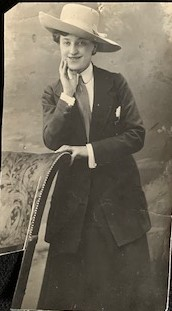
Manti in 1910

She settled permanently in Hamburg in the autumn of 1931 and ran "Lea Manti's Artists' Club" there. For a few weeks, Manti managed the lesbian bar "Monokel-Diele" in Berlin, which the subculture activist Lotte Hahm (1890–1967) had opened in March 1931. She eventually returned to Hamburg. Her stage engagements dwindled, and from October 1937 to April 1938, she worked at the "Café Näser" in Hamburg. There, she also collaborated with the manager, and together they created a small cabaret. After the café closed in April, she no longer had a monthly income. Until then, Manti had received an additional annual stipend from a family foundation in Frankfurt/Oder, established by her great-uncle, the former personal physician of Tsar Nicholas I. However, since 1932, the payments had been significantly reduced, and Manti had to rely on welfare. In the summer of 1938, she asked the Reich Theatre Chamber in Berlin for financial support from the "Artists' Thanks" fund, which had been established by Reich Propaganda Leader Joseph Goebbels (1897–1945). Manti signed her letters to the Chamber with a "Heil Hitler", but according to the form, she was not a member of the Nazi Party. The support was granted, and her career was revived between 1940 and 1943, with guest appearances in Karlovy Vary (Carlsbad), in the "Reichsgau Sudetenland", and in Riga during the German occupation of Latvia.

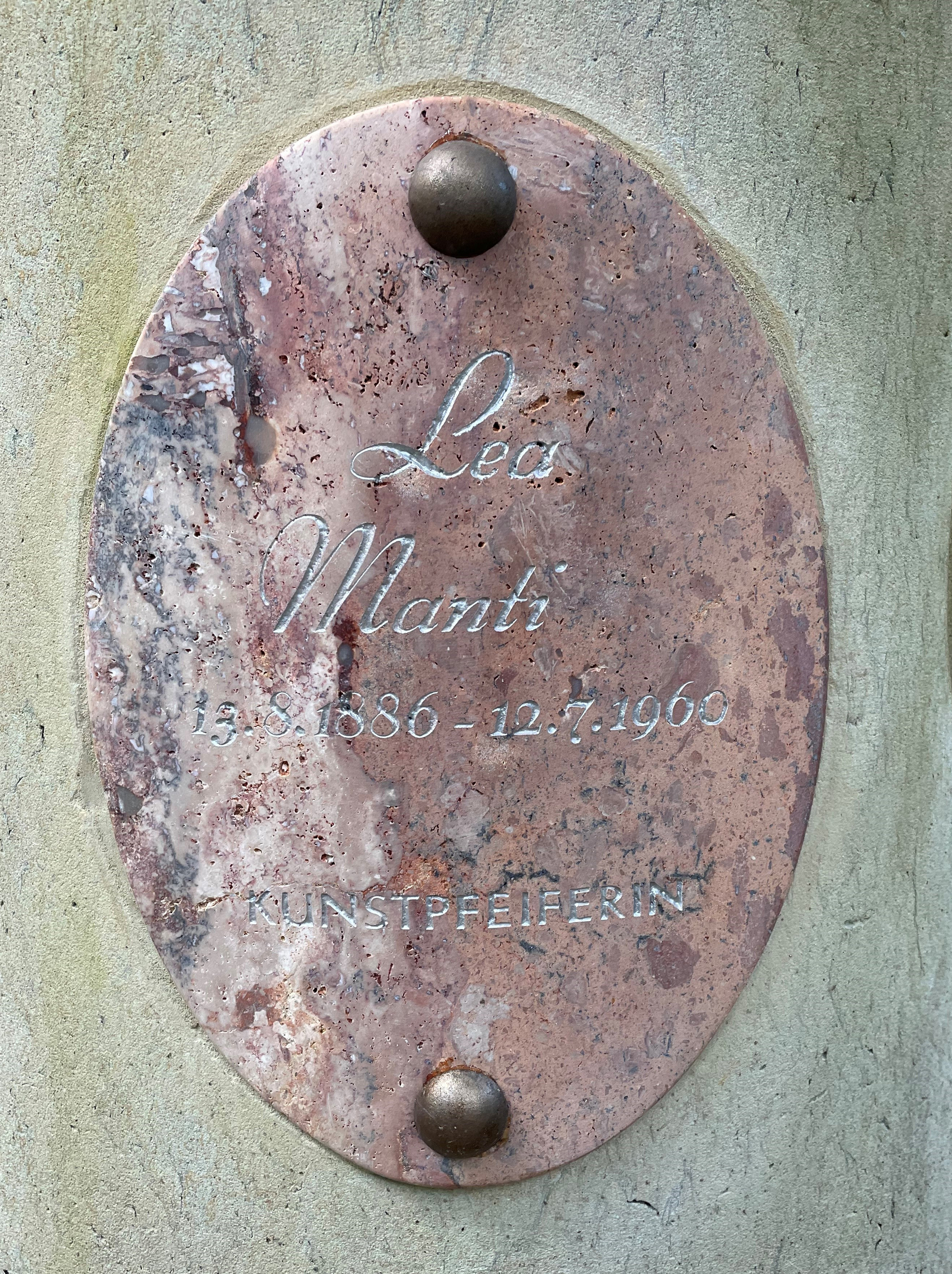
Memorial plaque of Manti

Presumably from 1944 onwards, the dancer Betti Scheuing (1913–1996) was Lea Manti's partner. After the war, the two women lived together in Hamburg. From November 1958, Lea Manti likely stayed repeatedly at the Wintermoor sanatorium in Schneverdingen, Lower Saxony. She was ill and missed her partner. She wrote longing letters to Betti Scheuing, signing them "Let me hold you close to my heart in spirit" and "Many kisses" and "Yours, Lea". Their relationship lasted until Lea Manti's death in Hamburg on 12 July 1960.

Betti Scheuing then took care of everything else, organizing both Manti's funeral and her final resting place in Ohlsdorf Cemetery. She also carefully preserved the pictures and newspaper clippings that Lea Manti had collected about the various stages of her career. Even after Betti Scheuing's death in 1996, the collection was preserved. A memorial medallion for Lea Manti was placed on the memorial column in the Garden of Women at Ohlsdorf Cemetery in Hamburg.
