= Heinz Oskar Vetter =

German trade unionist and politician

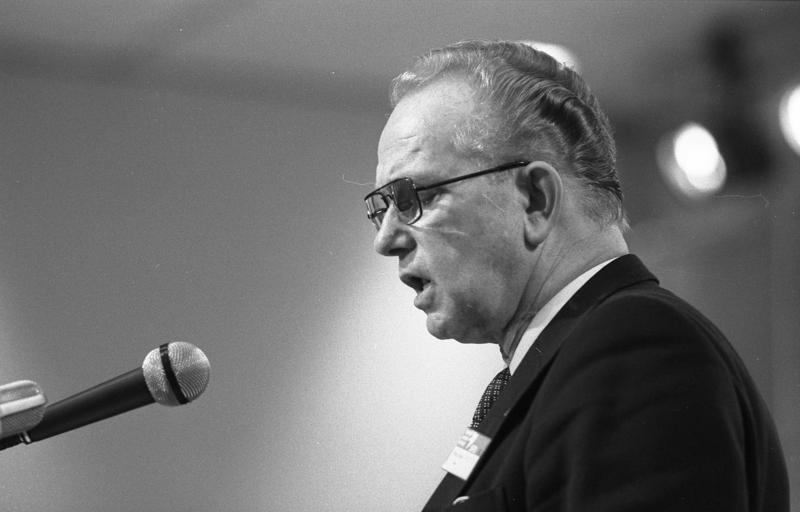

Heinz Oskar Vetter (21 October 1917 – 18 October 1990) was a German trade union leader and politician.

Born in Bochum, Vetter completed an apprenticeship as a locksmith, before becoming a machinist at a coal mine. He served in the Luftwaffe during World War II, before returning to mining. He joined the Union of Mining and Energy (IG BE), and became a union representative, working full-time for the union from 1952. In 1953, he joined the Social Democratic Party of Germany.

In 1960, Vetter was elected to the executive of IG BE, and in 1964 he became its vice-president. In 1969, he left, to become president of the German Trade Union Confederation, serving until 1982. From 1974 until 1979, he additionally served as president of the European Trade Union Confederation, and from 1979 to 1989 he served in the European Parliament.

Trade union offices
Preceded by Fritz Dahlmann	Vice President of the Union of Mining and Energy; 1964–1969	Succeeded by Karl van Bark
Preceded by Ludwig Rosenberg	President of the German Trade Union Confederation; 1969–1982	Succeeded by Ernst Breit
Preceded by Vic Feather	President of the European Trade Union Confederation; 1974–1979	Succeeded by Wim Kok
