= International Artists' Lodge =

German trade union

The International Artists' Lodge (German: Internationale Artisten-Loge, IAL) is a trade union section and former independent trade union, representing variety and circus performers in Germany.

The union was founded on 5 April 1901, on the initiative of the magician Max Buldermann. It was a founding affiliate of the General German Trade Union Confederation in 1919, and by 1920, it had 7,531 members. In 1921, it switched its affiliation to the General Federation of Free Employees. Internationally, from 1917, it was a member of the World League of Artists' Organisations. The union was banned by the Nazi government in May 1933, but it was revived in Berlin in 1945.

The post-World War II IAL affiliated to Union of Art and Literature in the Soviet-occupied zone, and to the Music, Film, Stage and Arts Union in the British-occupied zone. In 1949, it became a founding section of the Arts Union in West Germany, while it was dissolved in East Germany. The surviving union in West Germany affiliated to the International Federation of Variety Artists. It survives today as a section of the ver.di union.

== Presidents ==
1904: Max Buldermann
1926: Albert Fossil
1933: Union banned
1945: Carl Schwarz
1949: Willi Feldmann
