= Akira Yamagishi =

Japanese trade union leader

Akira Yamagishi (山岸 章, Yamagishi Akira; 18 July 1929 – 10 April 2016) was a Japanese trade union leader who served as the first president of the Japanese Trade Union Confederation from 1989 to 1994.

== Union career ==
Born in Osaka, Yamagishi began working in a telegram office, and joined the Japan Telecommunications Workers' Union. After many years active in the union, in 1982, he was elected as its president.

Yamagishi concentrated on making international and national links between unions. He affiliated the union to the Postal, Telegraph and Telephone International, and served as president of the International from 1985 to 1990. In 1989, he was a leading figure in bringing together the public- and private-sector unions in Japan, forming the Japanese Trade Union Confederation (Rengo), and serving as its first president.

== Politics ==
As the foremost trade union leader in Japan, Yamagishi supported the Japan Socialist Party and the Democratic Socialist Party. He cooperated with LDP defector Ichiro Ozawa to bring about a non-LDP and non-JCP coalition cabinet led by Morihiro Hosokawa in 1993, persuading the initially reluctant socialists to support the coalition.

== Death ==
In 1994 Yamagishi retired due to poor health. He died in 2016.

Trade union offices
Preceded by Glenn Watts	President of the Postal, Telegraph and Telephone International; 1985–1990	Succeeded by Curt Persson
Preceded by New position	President of the Japanese Trade Union Confederation; 1989–1994	Succeeded by Jinnosuke Ashida
