= Erwin Ferlemann =

German politician (1930-2000)

Erwin Ferlemann (16 March 1930 – 24 September 2000) was a German trade unionist.

Born in Wuppertal, Ferlemann's father was interned by the Nazi government for several years in the 1930s. Ferlemann attended school during World War II, then completed two apprenticeships: one as an export clerk, and one as a lithographer. He joined the Printing and Paper Union (IG Druck), and became more active in it after moving to Cologne. He also joined the Social Democratic Party of Germany.

In 1969, Ferlemann wrote the book Druckindustrie und Elektronik. That year, he began working full time for IG Druck, as head of its economics and technology department. He was elected as vice president of the union in 1976, then as president in 1983. He was also elected president of the International Graphical Federation.

As leader of IG Druck, Ferlemann courted controversy for describing East German writers who had defected to West German as a "fifth column". In 1989, he took IG Druck into a merger with the small Arts Union, forming the Media Union, and he became its first president. He retired in October 1992, and died in 2000.

Trade union offices
Preceded by Leonhard Mahlein	President of the Printing and Paper Union; 1983–1989	Succeeded by Union merged
Preceded by Leonhard Mahlein	President of the International Graphical Federation; 1983–1993	Succeeded by Rene van Tilborg
Preceded by New position	President of the Media Union; 1989–1992	Succeeded by Detlef Henschel
