= Joseph A. Beirne =

American labour union leader

Joseph Anthony Beirne (February 16, 1911 – September 2, 1974) was an American labour union leader.

Born in Jersey City, New Jersey, Beirne studied at St. Peter's College, and then at New York University. He worked for Western Electric, and in the 1930s became a leader of its employee organization, in 1943 becoming president of the National Federation of Telephone Workers. In 1946, he led the negotiation of its first national contract, with the American Telephone and Telegraph Company, but followed this with the unsuccessful 1947 Telephone strike.

This experience led the union to reform as the Communication Workers of America (CWA), with Beirne continuing as president. It affiliated with the Congress of Industrial Organizations (CIO), of which Beirne became a vice president, leading opposition to communist-led unions in the federation. He continued in the role after the CIO became part of the new AFL-CIO. He also promoted equal pay for equal work. During the 1960s, Beirne successfully prevented the International Brotherhood of Teamsters from organizing telephone workers, expelling the leaders of the CWA at Western Electric, who had supported the Teamsters. He was a member of the anti-Castro organization, Citizens Committee for a Free Cuba.

Under Beirne's leadership, the CWA supported unionism in Latin America, founding the American Institute for Free Labor Development. In 1969, he was also elected as president of the Postal, Telegraph and Telephone International. Unlike the majority of the AFL-CIO leadership, he supported George McGovern in the 1972 United States presidential election, and served as secretary-treasurer of a national labor committee backing him.

In 1974, Beirne announced his intention to stand down due to poor health, but he died of cancer before he was able to do so.

Trade union offices
Preceded by Paul E. Griffith	President of the National Federation of Telephone Workers; 1943–1947	Succeeded by Union refounded
Preceded by New position	President of the Communication Workers of America; 1947–1974	Succeeded by Glenn Watts
Preceded by Charles Delacourt-Smith	President of the Postal, Telegraph and Telephone International; 1969–1974	Succeeded by Ivan Reddish
Preceded by George McGregor Harrison; Jacob Potofsky	AFL-CIO delegate to the Trades Union Congress; 1959; With: William C. Doherty	Succeeded by David J. McDonald; Lee W. Minton
