= Leonhard Mahlein =

German functionary

Leonhard Mahlein (4 April 1921 – 18 December 1985), known as Loni Mahlein, was a German trade union leader.

Born in Nuremberg, Mahlein's father was a member of the Communist Party of Germany (KPD) who was arrested by the Nazis in 1935 and sentenced to two-and-a-half years in prison. Leonhard undertook an apprenticeship in printing, but was forced to leave his initial placement due to his own anti-Nazi views. He was eventually able to complete his apprenticeship, and joined the Printing and Paper Union, becoming leader of its youth section in Nuremberg, and also chaired his local works council.

From 1951 until 1956, Mahlein worked as a teacher of printing. He was a supporter of the KPD until 1952, but in 1956, he joined the Social Democratic Party of Germany, and was also elected as the deputy chair of the Printing and Paper Union in Bavaria. From 1965, he worked full-time for the union as the chair of its Bavaria district.

In 1968, Mahlein was elected as national president of the Printing and Paper Union, the senior role in the union. He was also elected to the executive of the International Graphical Federation (IGF), and was its president from 1976. His leadership of the union was marked by industrial action in 1973, 1976 and 1978, concerning pay, conditions, and computerisation. He was able to expand membership of the union by accepting journalists and writers into membership.

In 1983, Mahlein unexpectedly decided not to re-stand for the union leadership. Instead, he became joint editor of Nachrichten zur Wirtschafts- und Sozialpolitik, a monthly magazine linked with the KPD, until his death in 1985.

Trade union offices
Preceded by Heinrich Bruns	President of the Printing and Paper Union; 1968–1983	Succeeded by Erwin Ferlemann
Preceded by John Bonfield	President of the International Graphical Federation; 1976–1983	Succeeded by Erwin Ferlemann
