= Liberation Day (Germany) =

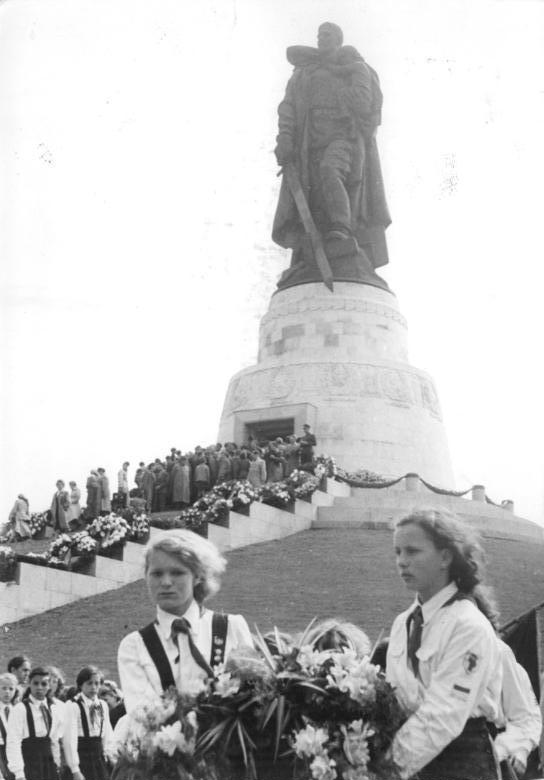
Members of the GDR children's organization Young Pioneers at the Soviet War Memorial in Treptower Park in 1954

Liberation Day (German: Tag der Befreiung) is a memorial day celebrated in Germany on 8 May, the anniversary of the signing of the German Instrument of Surrender of the remaining German armed forces to the Allies, ending World War II in Europe. From 1950–1966 and in 1985 in the former German Democratic Republic (East Germany), this day was celebrated as a public holiday. In the present Federal Republic of Germany, May 8 is not a holiday or a day off; however, commemorative events are typically held on this day, especially on round anniversaries.

== Federal Republic of Germany ==
May 8th was not a point of reference in the early Federal Republic of Germany's Culture of Remembrance and otherwise received little public attention. May 8, 1955, was overshadowed by the entry into force of the Paris Agreements (May 5th to 9th, 1955) and the resulting restoration of sovereignty. The tenth anniversary of the military surrender was mentioned in this context "as the beginning of a development that ended with the restoration of sovereignty, but not as an independent date." The government under Willy Brandt was the first federal government to issue an official government statement in the German Bundestag on May 8, 1970, to mark the 25th anniversary. Chancellor Gerhard Schröder said on May 8, 2000: “No one seriously disputes today that May 8, 1945, was a day of liberation – liberation from Nazi rule, from genocide, and from the horrors of war.”

=== May 8th as a public holiday ===
In Germany, the establishment of May 8th as a formal public holiday or day of remembrance has been a topic of discussion at the federal and state levels for decades. These initiatives have come particularly from trade unions and political parties such as the Social Democratic Party of Germany, Alliance 90/The Greens, and Die Linke, as well as from survivors of Nazi persecution. In 2020, on the 75th anniversary of the Liberation of Auschwitz concentration camp, Esther Bejarano, chair of the Auschwitz Committee in Germany, called for May 8th to be declared a public holiday at the federal level. Axel Drecol, director of the Brandenburg Memorials Foundation, also supported this. As early as May 2018, the German Trade Union Confederation Federal Congress had resolved to advocate for a nationwide public holiday. In 2005, a "Day of Democracy" was held in Berlin to mark the 60th anniversary. The 75th anniversary, on May 8, 2020, was a one-time public holiday in Berlin. The 80th anniversary, on May 8, 2025, was also a public holiday in Berlin.

== German Democratic Republic (East Germany) ==
In the German Democratic Republic, the events surrounding this holiday, introduced in 1950 under Walter Ulbricht's government by a resolution of the Volkskammer and celebrated in the German Democratic Republic as the Day of the Liberation of the German People from Hitler Fascism. In 1967, with the introduction of the five-day week, the day, along with other holidays, became a regular workday again. On the 30th anniversary of the end of the war in 1975, Victory Day (Tag des Sieges) was declared a public holiday by the Central Committee of the Socialist Unity Party of Germany. In 1985, for the 40th anniversary, May 8 was once again observed as a public holiday.

=== 1965 Victory Parade ===
The 1965 Berlin Victory Day Parade was held on 9 May 1965 to commemorate the 20th anniversary of the capitulation of Nazi Germany in 1945. The parade marks the Soviet Union's victory in the Great Patriotic War. Commanded by Lieutenant General Kurt Wagner, its participants included members of the National People's Army (NVA) and the Group of Soviet Forces in Germany.

Walter Ulbricht, First Secretary of the Socialist Unity Party of Germany, reviewed the parade. Invited were the leaders of neighboring countries: János Kádár of Hungary, Nicolae Ceauşescu of Romania, Josip Broz Tito of Yugoslavia, Yumjaagiin Tsedenbal of Mongolia. Chairman of the Council of Ministers of the USSR Alexei Kosygin also attended the parade, along the first Soviet cosmonaut, Yuri Gagarin, was among the distinguished guests. After the Victory Day parade, the parade participants also took a tour of Treptower Park.

== See also ==
- Victory in Europe Day
