= The Federation of Information and Communication Technology Service Workers of Japan =

Trade union in Japan

The Federation of Information and Communication Technology Service Workers of Japan (ICTJ, Japanese: 情報産業労働組合連合会) is a trade union representing IT and telecommunications workers in Japan.

The union was established in 1962 as the All-Japan Telecommunication Workers' Union. It affiliated to the General Council of Trade Unions of Japan, and by 1967, it had 226,685 members. In 1978, it joined the Postal, Telegraph and Telephone International. At the end of the 1980s, it joined the Japanese Trade Union Confederation, of which its president, Akira Yamagishi, became the first leader. In 1991, it became the ICTJ, and by 2009, its membership was 220,730. By 2020, its membership had fallen to 199,135.
