= Eisenbahn- und Verkehrsgewerkschaft =

German trade union

- Founded: 30 November 2010
- Headquarters: Frankfurt am Main, Berlin
- Location: Germany
- Members: 185,000 (2025)
- Publication: Gewerkschaft
- Website: https://www.evg-online.org/

The Eisenbahn- und Verkehrsgewerkschaft EVG ("railway and transport union") is a German trade union with approximately 204,000 members, which represents most railway-related workers and professionals.

== History ==
EVG was founded on November 30, 2010 in Fulda as an unification of the existing unions Transnet (210,000 members) and GDBA (30,000 members), which had collaborated since 2005.

After a year-long dispute, EVG and German rail operator Deutsche Bahn agreed in 2015 to a wage hike for all 160,000 employees of 3.5 percent, or at least 80 euros more per month; the union had originally called for a wage hike of 6 percent for its workers. In late 2018, EVG again staged a four-hour stoppage that brought long-distance rail traffic to a standstill and disrupted commuter and freight trains; as a result, Deutsche Bahn agreed to a 29-month wage deal, including another 3.5 percent raise. In March 2023, EVG and the United Services Trade Union (ver.di) called 24-hour "warning" strikes, one of the largest walkouts in decades in Germany.

The EVG is a member of the Confederation of German Trade Unions (DGB). Like both Transnet and GDBA, EVG is affiliated with the European Transport Workers' Federation and the International Transport Workers' Federation.
