= Christian Fette =

German politician (1895–1971)

Christian Fette (1 February 1895 – 26 October 1971) was a German trade unionist.

Born in Bremen, Fette completed an apprenticeship as a book printer. He joined his trade union, and also the Social Democratic Party of Germany. He fought in World War I, then returned to his trade. In 1920, he was elected as the chair of the Bremen District of the Union of German Book Printers, then in 1924 as chair of its Duisburg district. In 1931, he became vice president of the union's Rheinland-Westphalia region.

In 1933, the Nazis dissolved the German trade unions. Fette was dismissed and repeatedly arrested, then put under police observation. He spent a lengthy period unemployed, before finding work as a machine maker.

After World War II, Fette was a leading founder of the Printing and Paper Union, serving as its first president, and also on the first board of the International Graphical Federation. In 1951, he was elected as president of the German Trade Union Confederation. A supporter of Konrad Adenauer and of German rearmament, his leadership was unpopular, and he lost a bid for re-election in 1952.

From 1953, Fette worked in the press office of the DGB's Neue Heimat company. He retired in 1958.

Trade union offices
| Preceded by New position | President of the Printing and Paper Union; 1949–1951 | Succeeded by Heinrich Hansen |
| Preceded by Hans Böckler | President of the German Trade Union Confederation; 1951–1952 | Succeeded by Walter Freitag |
