= Ernst Breit =

German trade union leader

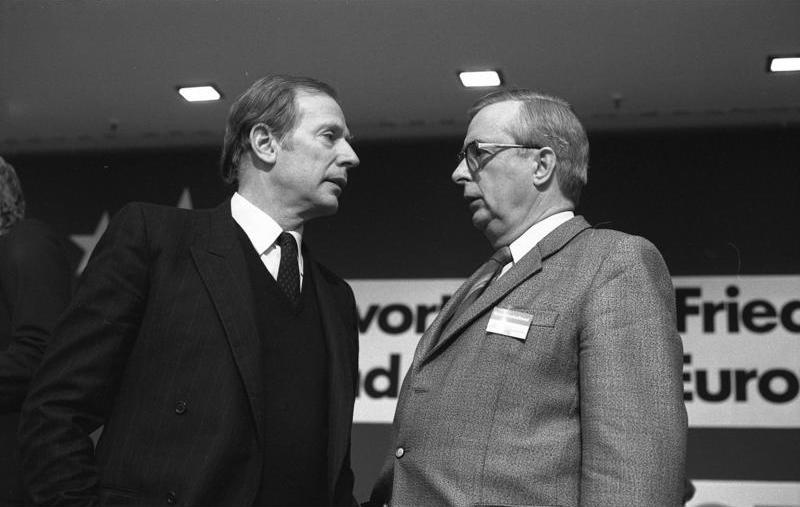
- Breit (right) in 1983
- Born: 20 August 1924; Rickelshof, Germany
- Died: 22 February 2013 (aged 88)
- Occupation: Trade union leader
- Years active: 1941–1990
- Organizations: German Postal Union (DPG); Postal, Telegraph and Telephone International (PTTI); German Trade Union Confederation (DGB); European Trade Union Confederation (ETUC)
- Known for: Chair of the German Trade Union Confederation (1982–1990)
- Relatives: Ursula (daughter)

Ernst Breit (20 August 1924 – 22 February 2013) was a German trade union leader.

Born in Rickelshof, Breit joined the Reichspost as a trainee inspector in 1941, but the following year was conscripted into the army. He later became a prisoner of war, but at the end of World War II was released and returned to the post office, working in Heide. He joined the German Postal Union (DPG), becoming part of his local works council. In 1952, he joined the executive committee of the Kiel district of the DPG, and from 1953 to 1959 served as its chair, while also serving on the union's national executive committee.

In 1956, Breit was promoted to run the post office in Neustadt, then from 1959 he ran the personnel department at the Federal Post Office. In 1971 he became the national chair of the DPG, and the following year was also elected to the executive of the Postal, Telegraph and Telephone International (PTTI), and as deputy chair of the Board of the Federal Post. In 1978, Breit was elected as the president of the PTTI, then in 1982 he became the chair of the German Trade Union Confederation. His time in office was difficult, working with the conservative government of Helmut Kohl, but he was well regarded, and in 1985 also became the president of the European Trade Union Confederation.

Breit retired in 1990, and died in 2013.

His daughter Ursula is married to SPD politician Thilo Sarrazin.

Trade union offices
Preceded by Carl Stenger	Chair of the German Postal Union; 1971–1982	Succeeded by Kurt van Haaren
Preceded by Ivan Reddish	President of the Postal, Telegraph and Telephone International; 1979–1984	Succeeded by Glenn Watts
Preceded by Heinz Oskar Vetter	Chair of the German Trade Union Confederation; 1982–1990	Succeeded by Heinz-Werner Meyer
Preceded by Georges Debunne	President of the European Trade Union Confederation; 1985–1991	Succeeded by Norman Willis
