= Trade, Banking and Insurance Union =

German trade union

The Trade, Banking and Insurance Union (German: Gewerkschaft Handel, Banken und Versicherungen, HBV) was a trade union representing workers in commerce and finance in Germany.

During 1947 and 1948, German trade unionists were regrouping and the majority decided to establish the German Trade Union Confederation (DGB), with national affiliated industrial unions - unions covering the entirety of one or more industries. Leading figures in commerce and finance trade unionism disagreed with this approach, and formed the German Salaried Employees' Union (DAG), wishing to organise salaried workers across all industries and public sectors. The DAG did not join the DGB, and so leading figures in the DGB decided to form a rival union, restricted to the commerce and finance sectors.

The union was established on 3 and 4 September 1949, at a conference in Königswinter. Initially small, by 1959 it had 130,000 members, and continued to grow, with strong representation among retail workers and bank branch staff, but little influence in other areas of finance. Growth continued, with a particular spurt following the Reunification of Germany, but then tailed off. By the end of 1999, it had 457,720 members.

In 2001, the union merged with the DAG, the German Postal Union, the Media Union, and the Public Services, Transport and Traffic Union, to form Ver.di.

== Presidents ==
1949: Wilhelm Pawlik
1961: Werner Ziemann
1965: Heinz Vietheer
1980: Günter Volkmar
1988: Lorenz Schwegler
1993: Margret Mönig-Raane
