= Printing and Paper Union (Germany) =

Former West German trade union (1948–1989)

The Printing and Paper Union (German: Industriegewerkschaft Druck und Papier, IG DruPa) was a trade union representing printing industry workers in West Germany.

The union was founded on 29 November 1948, to represent workers in book printing, type founding, planographic printing, gravure printing, image production, bookbinding and paper processing. A few journalists also joined, and in 1951, they were given their own section, the "German Journalists Union". In 1949, the union became a founder member of the International Graphical Federation.

By 1988, the union had 150,288 members. The following year, it merged with the Arts Union, to form the Media Union and is today a part of ver.di.

== Presidents ==
1949: Christian Fette
1951: Heinrich Hansen
1962: Heinrich Bruns
1968: Werner Schmidt (acting)
1968: Leonhard Mahlein
1983: Erwin Ferlemann
