= Communications Workers' Union (Ghana) =

Trade union in Ghana

The Communications Workers' Union is a trade union representing workers in the postal and telecommunication sectors in Ghana.

The union was founded in about 1958, as the Union of Postal and Telecommunications Workers of Ghana, with the merger of the Ghana Post Office African Employees' Union and the Post Office Engineering Union. It affiliated to the Ghana Trades Union Congress, and also to the Postal, Telegraph and Telephone International.

The union's membership peaked at 16,000 in 1972. By 1985, the union had 7,000 members, and this fell to 6,026 in 1998. In 1991, it renamed itself as the "Communication Workers' Union".

The union has been hit by the sale of Ghana Telecom, and the decline in demand for the services of Ghana Post. By 2012, its membership had fallen to 2,881.
