= Curt Persson =

Swedish trade union leader (1938–2020)

Curt Persson (8 November 1938 – 23 November 2020) was a Swedish trade union leader.

Persson started work in 1954 as a postman and joined the Swedish Post Union. In 1961, he became education officer for its Malmö branch, later serving as its secretary, then its chair. In 1969, he began working full-time for the Cartel of State Employees, then from 1970 as an organiser for the Swedish National Union of State Employees (SF). From 1972, he was a negotiator for the union, then chief negotiator from 1978. In 1984, he was elected as president of SF, in which role he encouraged it to recruit outside the public sector.

In 1990, Persson was additionally elected as president of the Postal, Telegraph and Telephone International (PTTI), championing it working more closely with the International Graphical Federation and the International Federation of Commercial, Clerical, Professional and Technical Employees. He retired from SF in 1995, becoming chair of SOS Alarm, and stood down from the PTTI in 1997. In 2008, he became president of the Swedish National Pensioners' Organisation, serving until 2015. He died of complications from COVID-19 in November 2020.

Trade union offices
Preceded by Lars-Erik Nicklasson	President of the Swedish National Union of State Employees; 1984–1995	Succeeded by Gunnar Erlandsson
Preceded by Akira Yamagishi	President of the Postal, Telegraph and Telephone International; 1990–1997	Succeeded by Kurt van Haaren
Non-profit organization positions
Preceded by Lars Wettergren	President of the Swedish National Pensioners' Organisation; 2008–2015	Succeeded by Christina Tallberg
