= Glenn Watts =

American labor union leader

Glenn Ellis Watts (June 4, 1920 – August 30, 2002) was an American labor union leader.

Born in Stony Point, North Carolina, Watts' family moved to Washington, D.C. during the Great Depression. He attended Wilson Teachers College. In 1941, he began working as a telephone installer with the Chesapeake and Potomac Telephone Company, and he joined the National Federation of Telephone Workers. He was soon elected as president of his local, then began working full-time for the union. He was elected as vice president of District 2 of what had become the Communication Workers of America (CWA), and then in 1956 became an assistant to president Joseph A. Beirne.

Watts was later elected as vice-president of the union, then in 1969 as secretary-treasurer. In 1974, he succeeded Beirne as president of the union, and led three rounds of successful negotiations with the Bell System, the contract covering more workers than any other at the time. He promoted co-operation with management, and the formation of "quality of work-life" committees. Once the break-up of the Bell System was announced, he launched a Committee for the Future, which met with futurists to plan the future role of the union as communications changed. He also promoted better rights for women at work. He was a vice president of the AFL–CIO, and persuaded the federation to create a Committee on Women.

Watts also served as president of the Postal, Telegraph and Telephone International, in which he prioritized support for unionization in Latin America. He served on the Democratic National Committee, as chair of the board of governors of the United Way of America, on the National Holocaust Memorial Commission, and as a trustee of the Ford Foundation. He retired in 1985, to live in Chevy Chase, Maryland.

Trade union offices
| Preceded by William A. Smallwood | Secretary-Treasurer of the Communication Workers of America; 1969–1974 | Succeeded by Louis Knecht |
| Preceded by Joseph A. Beirne | President of the Communication Workers of America; 1974–1985 | Succeeded by Morton Bahr |
| Preceded by Ernst Breit | President of the Postal, Telegraph and Telephone International; 1984–1985 | Succeeded by Akira Yamagishi |
| Preceded by J. C. Turner | AFL-CIO delegate to the Trades Union Congress; 1978 | Succeeded by John H. Lyons, Jr. |
