= Carl Stenger =

German politician and trade union leader

Carl Stenger (26 November 1905 – 29 June 1982) was a German politician and trade union leader.

Stenger grew up in Frankfurt and, at the age of fifteen, became a locksmith, and joined the German Metal Workers' Union. In 1924, he moved to work for the Reichspost, and joined the German Transport Workers' Union.

Following World War II, Stenger focused on reconstructing the trade union movement in West Germany, becoming chair of the Association of German Postal Unions. In 1949, he chaired the founding conference of the German Postal Union (DPG), then became its first leader. He also won election to the executive of the Postal, Telegraph and Telephone International, and from 1960 to 1966 served as its president.

Stenger was a member of the Social Democratic Party of Germany, and in 1957 was elected in Hesse, serving a single term. He retired from his union posts in 1971, but remained active on the executive of the recreation committee of the DPG.

Trade union offices
Preceded by New position	Chair of the German Postal Union; 1950–1971	Succeeded by Ernst Breit
Preceded by William Norton	President of the Postal, Telegraph and Telephone International; 1960–1966	Succeeded by Ron Smith
