= German Salaried Employees' Union =

German trade union

DAG
- German Salaried Employees' Union
- Deutsche Angestellten-Gewerkschaft
- Merged into: Ver.di
- Founded: April 1949
- Dissolved: 2001
- Location: Germany
- Members: 400,000 (1999)
- Affiliations: Independent

The German Salaried Employees' Union, in German Deutsche Angestellten-Gewerkschaft (DAG) was an independent trade union based in Hamburg. It did not belong to the German Confederation of Trade Unions until it became part of ver.di, the united trade union for the services industry, in 2001.

== History ==
The DAG was founded in Stuttgart-Bad Cannstatt in April 1949 when the employees' associations in the three western zones of Germany joined. The first employees' union associations were registered in the middle of the 19th century. In the Weimar Republic, up to one hundred different employees' associations joined up to form three main employees' federations: the social democratic AfA Federation (AfA-Bund), the liberal Union of Employees (Gewerkschaftsbund der Angestellten) and the Nationalist Christian Grand Association of German Employees' Unions (Gesamtverband der deutschen Angestelltengewerkschaften). The DAG considered itself as a successor to the employees' federations which existed until they were broken up by the Nazis in 1933.

The DAG established itself as a career-oriented employees' union independent of any political party. It did not belong to the German Confederation of Trade Unions and was a leading independent political organisation which influenced the Bundestag and the Cabinet of Germany in the interests of its members. One effect it had in the 1950s was to restore choice to the individual as concerned social insurance and to ensure that nearly all German employees had social insurance.

In the decades that followed, the DAG had a lasting effect on the wage system for employees and influenced their qualifications. It ran training centres, making it one of the largest providers of employee training in West Germany. Its functions were strictly divided into official and voluntary ones following a decision at the national congress in 1957.

In 1998, the DAG had 485,225 members, with about 55% being women.

In 2001 the DAG merged with four unions of the German Confederation of Trade Unions (DPG, HBV, ÖTV, IG Medien) becoming the ver.di, the united trade union for the services industry. At the time of the integration the union had about 2.9 million members.

== Presidents ==
1949: Fritz Rettig
1959: Georg Schneider (acting)
1960: Rolf Spaethen
1967: Hermann Brandt
1987: Roland Issen
