= Ver.di Jugend =

Youth organization

ver.di Jugend
- ver.di Jugend logo
- Formation: 2001
- Headquarters: Berlin
- Members: 120,423 (December 2025)
- Chairman: Joshua Kensy
- Deputy Chairwoman: Deborah Neuenfeld
- Deputy Chairwoman: Anna-Luisa Jansen
- Staff: approximately 70 (2025)
- Website: https://jugend.verdi.de/

ver.di Jugend is the youth organization of the United Services Union (Ver.di). All members up to the age of 28 are automatically enrolled in it. The ver.di trade union was formed in 2001 through the merger of five individual unions and is a member of the German Trade Union Confederation (DGB). ver.di Youth advocates for better training, working, and living conditions for apprentices, dual-study students, and young adults, as well as for a more equitable society. It also conducts actions and campaigns to achieve these goals.

== Structure ==
The ver.di Youth, like its parent organization, is divided into 10 regional districts and 5 specialist departments. Representatives from each department and district have voting rights at these organizational levels. The highest body is the Federal Youth Conference, which takes place every four years. Between conferences, the Federal Youth Executive Board, as the highest body, manages the affairs of ver.di Youth. The Federal Youth Executive Board comprises volunteer representatives from the ten regional districts and specialist departments.

Some departments have their own youth committees at the federal, state, district, and local levels. The entire organizational structure is regulated in the ver.di Youth guidelines. The standard monthly membership fee is 1% of monthly gross earnings. School pupils, students, and those performing military or civilian service pay €2.50 per month.

According to the ver.di Youth guidelines, the Federal Youth Executive Board is headed by an executive director (GF BJV), who is elected by the Federal Youth Conference. (As of February 2014).

Joshua Kensy is the honorary chair of ver.di Youth, and Deborah Neuenfeld and Anna-Luisa Jansen are the deputy chairs. The executive board was elected by the delegates at the Federal Youth Conference in May 2023. Anna-Luisa Jansen was subsequently elected by the Federal Youth Executive Board. Full-time youth secretaries are employed at all levels; Astrid Gorsky is the Federal Youth Secretary.

== Profile ==
ver.di Youth sees itself as an advocate for young professionals and employees. As part of the United Services Union (ver.di), ver.di Youth organizes around 105,000 trainees, dual-study students, young employees, school pupils, and university students nationwide [as of December 2021]. The task of ver.di Youth, together with the relevant departments, is to reach out to this target group, incorporate their experiences, and support them in translating their interests into self-organized political and trade union action. This generally takes place in cooperation with youth and trainee representatives and ver.di activists in companies and public service offices. ver.di Youth is also active in other policy areas, such as social policy, housing policy, and social policy.

== Youth collective bargaining ==
Collective bargaining is at the heart of ver.di Youth. Training and working conditions don't improve automatically due to the differing interests of employers and young workers. However, a strong union, together with its members, can negotiate improvements in working and training conditions with employers' associations. A fundamental principle applies: the more young colleagues organize and become involved in the union, the more demands it can achieve with employers. Every round of collective bargaining in ver.di Youth follows a similar structure: the first phase is the survey of demands and activities, the second phase is mobilization and activation, followed by the third phase of actions and negotiations, and the fourth phase of results and follow-up.

In ver.di's collective bargaining rounds, volunteer bargaining commissions are involved, with a mandatory number of seats reserved for ver.di youth. ver.di can also establish its own youth bargaining commissions, which can participate in decisions regarding collective agreements on vocational training. This ensures the structural integration of young employees and trainees into ver.di's statutes and youth guidelines.

=== Youth tariff campaigns ===
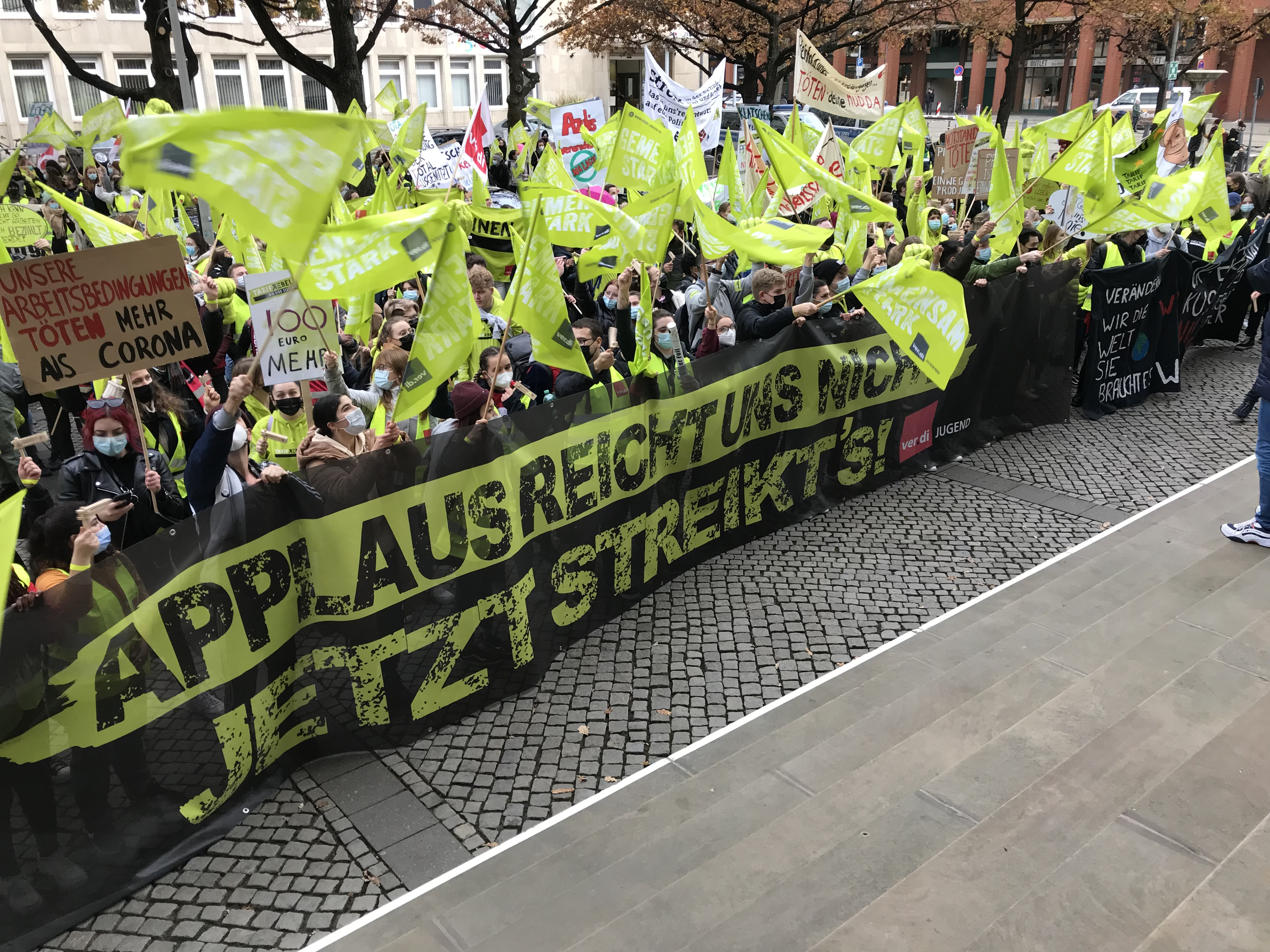
Youth strike by ver.di youth in the 2021 public sector wage negotiations in Hanover.

The ver.di Youth provides umbrella campaigns for use in the workplace. With a uniform design, various materials, and training opportunities, activists in companies are supported and trained to recruit more young colleagues for the collective bargaining round and thus enforce collective bargaining demands. The first youth collective bargaining campaign was called "Better Uncomfortable," which was succeeded by the "Collective Bargaining Deluxe" campaign. The youth collective bargaining campaign "Collective Bargaining Rebels" was completed in 2020 in collaboration with volunteers. It includes analog and digital tools for every phase of a collective bargaining round. At the beginning of 2022, the Federal Youth Executive Committee agreed to further develop and use the "Collective Bargaining Rebels" campaign until the end of 2023. All information on current collective bargaining rounds can be found on the campaign website at www.tarifrebellion.de.

In 2021, the Tarifrebell*innen campaign was nominated as a finalist in the “Interactive Engagement Campaign” category of the German Prize for Business Communication.

Youth strike days of the ver.di youth

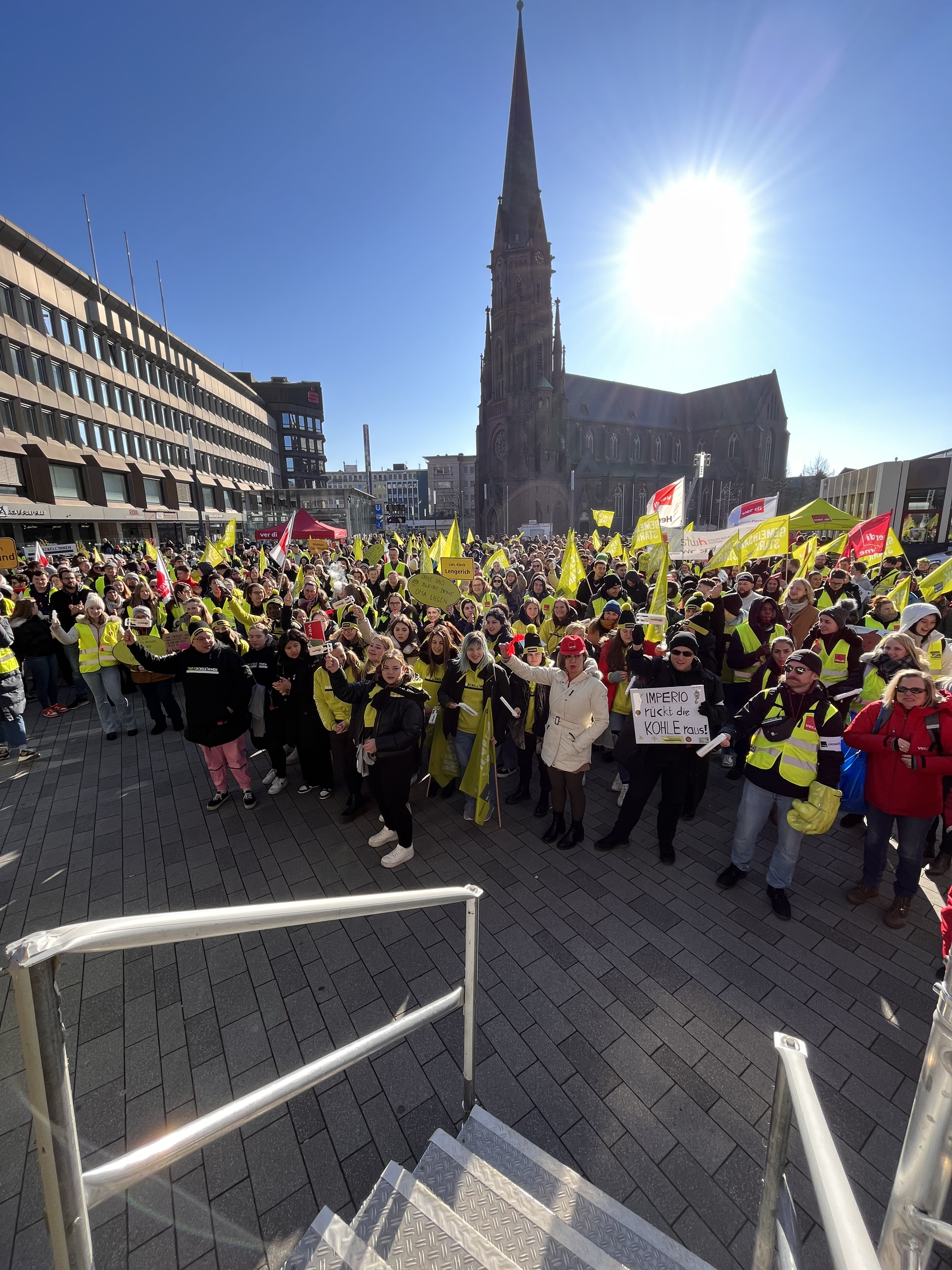
Youth strike day as part of the 2023 public sector wage negotiations (federal/municipal) in Gelsenkirchen with 1,500 participants.

In 2020, ver.di Youth had to call for the first time to a youth strike day for trainees and dual-study students in the federal and municipal public sector wage negotiations. More than 3,000 young people participated. Ver.di Chairman Frank Werneke described the youth strike as a logical consequence, as the employers had been very tight-lipped regarding the demands of the young people. During the 2021 wage negotiations for state employees, ver.di Youth again called for a youth action day for trainees and dual-study students. In the 2023 wage negotiations for the public sector, ver.di Youth again called for a nationwide youth strike day for trainees and dual-study students on 1 March 2023. More than 6,000 young people followed the call.

The youth strike day serves to raise awareness of the specific demands and training conditions in the public sector. In particular, prospective employees in the healthcare sector, but also trainees from all other areas of the public service, have heeded the calls of ver.di youth.

=== Recent collective bargaining successes of ver.di youth ===
In addition to increasing training allowances in all areas covered by ver.di's collective bargaining agreements, ver.di youth is consistently able to achieve qualitative improvements in collective bargaining rounds.

==== Banking industry ====
In the summer of 2021, it was possible to negotiate a collective agreement for junior staff in the public banking sector, which provides for the remuneration of dual students, a study allowance, as well as a collective agreement on taking over the business and entitlements to time off before final examinations.

==== Hairdressing trade ====
In 2018, the ver.di union was able to double or significantly increase wages in the hairdressing trade in Saxony-Anhalt, Thuringia, Baden-Württemberg and Lower Saxony. This followed a major campaign within the hairdressing industry to organize apprentices. Before the campaign, some hairdressing apprentices received considerably less than the current minimum apprenticeship wage.

==== Public service ====
In Berlin, a collective bargaining agreement was successfully negotiated in 2021 for employees and trainees at Charité and Vivantes hospitals, providing them with relief. According to this agreement, trainees will receive two days of on-the-job training for organizational familiarization on the ward, their work schedules will be provided eight weeks in advance, and they will receive workload credits for understaffed shifts, which can be used as time off after they are hired permanently. Additionally, Vivantes trainees will receive digital devices for both school and personal use.

In North Rhine-Westphalia, a collective bargaining agreement on workload reduction was also reached at the six university hospitals in 2022. This agreement regulated, among other things, the ratio of practical instructors to trainees in the various vocational training programs, the ratio of teachers to trainees in the hospitals' own schools, and mandatory structured training plans and timely duty rosters for some vocational training programs.

In October 2018, ver.di Youth successfully negotiated with public sector employers, securing an increase in pay from zero to €1,000 for school-based healthcare professions and their inclusion in the collective bargaining agreement. As part of the #unpaid campaign, numerous trainees organized within ver.di Youth and exerted pressure on employers through various actions.

In January 2020, a collective bargaining agreement was reached in the public sector at the federal, municipal, and state levels for the remuneration of dual study programs that integrate vocational training. Dual students now receive a study allowance, a tuition fee, 30 days of vacation, the right to travel home to their families, and reimbursement of travel expenses for training activities outside the training institution.

== Working with youth and trainee representatives ==
The ver.di Youth actively supports youth and trainee representatives (JAV/AV) in German companies. JAVs/AVs advocate for their young colleagues in the workplace and during their apprenticeships. They are granted co-determination rights under the Works Constitution Act and/or state staff representation laws. ver.di Youth provides strong support and expert advice to JAVs as they face challenges such as monitoring compliance with laws and collective bargaining agreements, continuously reviewing the quality of training, and striving to ensure that as many trainees as possible are hired after their apprenticeships. ver.di Youth operates the information portal www.jav.info, which provides initial information for prospective and active JAV members.

=== Support in the election ===
The ver.di Youth supports works councils/staff councils and young employees in the election of youth and trainee representatives in their companies. Using both analog and digital tools, such as a digital election assistant, sample letters, and timelines, ver.di members receive practical materials they can use for electing new bodies. In large companies, the ver.di Youth sometimes runs its own lists and election program to improve the long-term quality of training for young professionals.

=== Training and coaching ===
The ver.di Youth supports elected members with its own training courses, enabling them to acquire the theoretical and practical knowledge necessary for their work as youth representatives. The seminars generally take place at the ver.di Youth Education Center in Naumburg. In addition to introductory seminars, topic-specific seminars are also offered on combating discrimination, implementing collective bargaining agreements, and improving occupational health and safety. The seminars are led by instructors with practical experience in the workplace, allowing them to share their insights and knowledge with new youth representatives from other companies. The seminars emphasize a mix of engaging presentations, practical exercises.

Furthermore, ver.di Youth provides targeted advice and coaching to youth representatives (JAV) in cases of workplace conflicts or problems within their own JAV committees. Newly elected JAVs receive a voucher from ver.di Youth for a consultation. For JAV work within the company, ver.di Youth offers resources such as work aids, posters/flyers, and basic materials like business cards and PowerPoint presentations.

=== Networking ===
The ver.di Youth utilizes the network and experience of the ver.di service sector union to assist the Youth and Trainee Representation (JAV) in its work. To facilitate networking among JAV members, ver.di Youth provides regular meetings and working groups across districts. Through the participation of JAV members in ver.di committees, workplace issues are integrated into ver.di Youth's collective bargaining and policy work for implementation within companies.

== Youth and education policy ==
In addition to its work in the workplace and in collective bargaining, ver.di youth is involved in youth and training policy issues.

=== Minimum training allowance ===
The ver.di Youth is also advocating for minimum standards for trainees at the statutory level, as training conditions are particularly poor in sectors with weak union structures and a lack of collective bargaining agreements. At the 2017 Federal Youth Conference of the German Trade Union Confederation (DGB) Youth, ver.di Youth successfully pushed for a minimum training allowance. Until the end of 2019, employers were legally obligated under the Vocational Training Act to pay "appropriate training allowances." However, trainees and employers sometimes had widely differing views on what constituted "appropriate" allowances. Following successful political lobbying and union pressure, a minimum training allowance was introduced on 1 January 2020, and will be increased from 2024 onwards based on the average of all training allowances..

=== Levy-funded training guarantee ===
For several years, ver.di Youth has been advocating within the DGB trade unions and in the public sphere for a contribution-based apprenticeship guarantee. The background to this is that, from ver.di Youth's perspective, companies across the board are offering fewer and fewer apprenticeships, resulting in fewer young people being trained. The apprenticeship guarantee is a legally guaranteed right to an apprenticeship for all young people interested in vocational training who do not find one within a year. ver.di Youth wants the guarantee enshrined in the German Social Code, Book III (SGB III), thereby making it part of the state's labor market support measures.

From the perspective of ver.di Youth, the financing should be provided through a future fund into which all companies contribute. This would finance additional necessary apprenticeships and reward companies for their training efforts. In return, companies would receive financial compensation from the fund for their commitment to training by subsidizing the incurred training costs. This would create a financial incentive for companies to act as cooperation partners for cooperative training programs or to reward the provision of additional apprenticeships. While the coalition of the SPD, Greens, and FDP elected in 2021 agreed to implement an apprenticeship guarantee in their coalition agreement, they omitted the specific details. ver.di Youth rejects an apprenticeship guarantee without a future fund, as both components are interdependent and an apprenticeship guarantee can only be achieved with an adequate supply of apprenticeships.

== Seminars ==
Every year, ver.di Youth offers numerous seminars for members on a variety of topics. These can include current socio-political issues, training courses for personal development such as argumentation or rhetoric workshops, as well as workplace-related topics. There is also a comprehensive range of offerings for youth representatives to support them in their daily work. The seminars are primarily practice-oriented, as the educational program aims to provide members with the necessary tools to be effective in advocating for their interests within the company, for democratic participation, and for social justice. Furthermore, the guiding principle "Learning together is fun" is paramount. In addition to the content-related learning, the focus is always on getting to know one another, networking, and making new friends. The seminars are free for ver.di Youth members. However, the seminars specifically designed for youth representatives are always subject to a fee for the employer. The regional and nationwide training programs can either be picked up at the relevant ver.di office or downloaded digitally.

== On-site service ==
The ver.di Youth offers its members free services and advice on all matters relating to education and employment. Membership also includes legal protection. Furthermore, it offers additional benefits, such as leisure accident insurance. Full-time youth secretaries are available to the volunteer members of ver.di Youth to ensure smooth operations. They also support the volunteer committees of ver.di Youth and the overall organization on technical issues concerning vocational training and (dual) studies.

== Campaigns ==
The ver.di Youth organizes actions and campaigns in various forms on many issues affecting young people and trainees. For example, ver.di Youth conducts creative street protests and demonstrations, as well as public awareness and information work. It actively and publicly takes a stand on current political events.

One key focus is the equality of young people with a migration background or refugee experience. Through various forums and committees, she collaborates with other organizations committed to anti-racism.

Especially in youth collective bargaining, there is an increased focus on campaigns. In addition to sector-specific campaigns, such as the "perform better" campaign in the hairdressing trade or the "uncomfortable" campaign for previously unpaid trainees at university hospitals, the volunteers of ver.di youth also develop campaigns for large-scale collective bargaining rounds.

== Socio-political focus of ver.di youth ==
Since 2019, the volunteer Federal Youth Executive Board of ver.di Youth has chosen a socio-political focus each year, for which they work in detail with a support team composed of activists from various workplaces. The materials and actions developed can then be implemented independently by youth and trainee representatives and activists from workplaces, either within their companies or in ver.di Youth committees. The current focus is on ableism, i.e., discrimination based on disabilities or impairments..

Year	Socio-political focus
2019	#NoTddZ
2020	#StillLovingFeminism
2021	#AgainstAllAntisemitism
2022	#RefugeesWelcome
2023	#BreakingDownBarriers
2024	#MentalHealth

== DGB Youth and cooperation with the trade unions ==
The ver.di Youth is part of the DGB-Jugend and thus part of a nationally recognized youth organization under youth welfare law. In some federal states, the ver.di Youth is also recognized as an independent provider of youth services. As part of the DGB Youth, ver.di advocates for its key issues and tries to win over other member unions within the DGB to these issues. The ver.di Youth also regularly shows solidarity with the collective bargaining disputes of other union youth organizations to support their fight for better working and training conditions.
