= Dieter Schulte =

German trade union leader (1940–2022)

Dieter Schulte (13 January 1940 – 3 September 2022) was a German trade union leader. He was chairman of the German Confederation of Trade Unions (DGB) from 1994 to 2002.

Born in Duisburg, Schulte worked as a bricklayer, then for Thyssen Stahl AG. In 1957, he joined the Building and Construction Union, then in 1958 transferred to IG Metall. From 1970, he held a variety of union posts, eventually in 1991 becoming the union's director. He left in 1994 to become president of the DGB, serving until his retirement in 2002.

He died on 3 September 2022 at age 82.
