= Public Employees Association of Papua New Guinea =

Papua New Guinea

The Public Employees Association of Papua New Guinea is a trade union in Papua New Guinea representing workers in the public sector. It is reportedly the largest trade union in the country, with a membership of over 10,000.
