= Media Union =

Former German trade union (1989–2001)

The Media Union (German: IG Medien – Druck und Papier, Publizistik und Kunst) was a trade union representing German workers in the printing, paper, journalism and arts.

The union was founded on 15 April 1989 at a meeting in Hamburg, with the merger of the Printing and Paper Union and the Arts Union. The diversity of professions and job profiles that could be found in IG Medien was reflected in the nine sectoral groups:

- Printing and Publishing
- Paper and Plastics Processing
- Broadcasting/Film/Audio-visual Media (RFFU)
- Journalism (dju/SWYV)
- Association of German Writers (VS)
- Fine Arts (BGBK)
- Performing Arts (IAL/Theater)
- Music (DMV/GDMK)
- Publishers and Agencies.

In October 1990, it absorbed the East German Printing and Paper Union and Arts Union, and for a time renamed itself as IG Medien Deutschlands.

By 1998, the union had 184,656 members.

In 2001, it merged with the German Postal Union, the German Salaried Employees' Union, the Public Services, Transport and Traffic Union, and the Trade, Banking and Insurance Union, to form Ver.di.

== Presidents ==
1989: Erwin Ferlemann
1992: Detlef Henschel
