= Verkehrsgewerkschaft GDBA =

The Verkehrsgewerkschaft GDBA ("transport union GDBA") was a German trade union.

It was founded on May 23, 1948 in North Rhine-Westphalia as "Gewerkschaft Deutscher Bundesbahnbeamten und Anwärter" and was a member of the German Civil Service Federation.

Since autumn 2005 GDBA worked together with the "rival" union Transnet.

On November 30, 2010 the delegates of a union convention in Fulda decided to merge with Transnet to the new union EVG.
