= Public Services, Transport and Traffic Union =

Former West German trade union (1949–2001)

The Public Services, Transport and Traffic Union (German: Gewerkschaft Öffentliche Dienste, Transport und Verkehr, ÖTV) was a trade union representing transport and public service workers in West Germany.

The union was founded in 1949, at a meeting in Stuttgart. Unlike the pre-war General Union of Public Sector and Transport Workers, it did not represent postal workers (who joined the German Postal Union), nor commercial workers, but it was nonetheless the second-largest union in West Germany. By 1951, it had 785,000 members, and during the 1950s it concluded many collective bargaining agreements with states and municipalities. It affiliated to both the International Transport Workers' Federation, and the Public Services International.

The union strongly supported the fall of the Berlin Wall, and in June 1990, some trade unionists in Magdeburg founded the ÖTV in the GDR. In October, Germany was reunified, and this union merged into the main ÖTV, which began recruiting members across East Germany.

In 1994, the union was restructured, with its 41 departments grouped into six sections. By 1998, it had 1,582,776 members. It began working closely with the German Salaried Employees' Union (DAG), and in 2001, it merged with the DAG, the German Postal Union, the Media Union, and the Trade, Banking and Insurance Union, to form Ver.di.

== Presidents ==
1949: Adolph Kummernuss
1964: Heinz Kluncker
1982: Monika Wulf-Mathies
1994: Herbert Mai
2000: Frank Bsirske
