= TRANSNET Gewerkschaft =

German trade union

TRANSNET
- TRANSNET Gewerkschaft GdED
- Merged into: EVG
- Founded: 1896 as GdED, refounded 1948
- Dissolved: 2010
- Headquarters: Frankfurt am Main, Germany
- Location: Germany
- Key people: Alexander Kirchner, president
- Affiliations: DGB
- Website: transnet.org

TRANSNET, which stands for Transport, Service, and Networks, was a trade union in Germany and one of eight industrial affiliations of the German Confederation of Trade Unions.

Since autumn 2005, TRANSNET worked together with the "rival" union GDBA.

On November 30, 2010, the delegates of a union convention in Fulda decided to merge with GDBA to the new union EVG.

== Presidents ==
1949: Hans Jahn
1959: Philipp Seibert
1979: Ernst Haar
1988: Rudi Schäfer
1999: Norbert Hansen
2008: Lothar Krauß
2008: Alexander Kirchner
