= Arts Union (Germany) =

Former German trade union (1949–1989)

The Arts Union (German: Gewerkschaft Kunst) was a trade union representing cultural workers in West Germany.

The union was founded on 26 August 1949, at a conference in Frankfurt. It was initially based in Hamburg, but relocated to Düsseldorf in 1955.

The union initially had five sections:

- Association of Visual Artists
- German Musicians' Union
- Guild of the German Stage
- International Artists' Lodge
- Professional Association of Journalists and Writers (transferred to Printing and Paper Union in 1951)

Other sections were created later, including the Broadcast Television Film Union, the Union of Music Educators and Concert Artists, and the Jazz/rock/pop/improvised music group.

By 1988, the union had a membership of 29,613. The following year, it merged with the Printing and Paper Union, to form the Media Union.

== Presidents ==
1949: Willi Feldmann
1954: Heinrich Wüllner
1962: Viktor de Kowa
1966: Wolfgang Windgassen
1973: Otto Sprenger
1980: Alfred Horné
