= Ludwig Rosenberg =

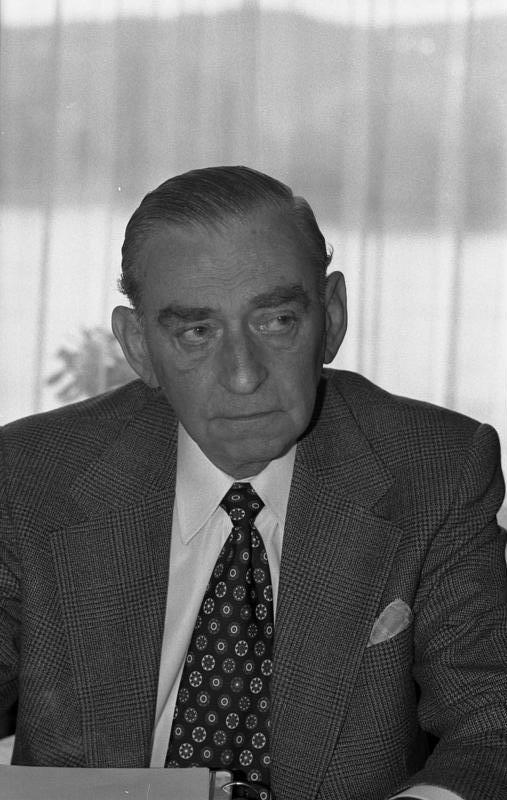
- Born: 29 June 1903; Charlottenburg, Germany
- Died: 23 October 1977 (aged 74); Düsseldorf, Germany
- Occupation: Trade unionist

Ludwig Rosenberg (29 June 1903 – 23 October 1977) was a German trade unionist and one of the few German Jews holding prominent positions in German politics before the appointment of Adolf Hitler as Chancellor of Germany that survived. Rosenberg was known for his embrace of the social market economy, which put him at odds with party-line Marxists in the labor movement.

== Life ==
Rosenberg was born to a middle-class Jewish family in Charlottenburg in 1903.

Rosenberg joined the Young Republicans' League when he was 18 years old. In 1930, he became a labor union secretary in Berlin. In June 1933, Rosenberg avoided arrest by the Nazis by fleeing to the United Kingdom. In the UK he worked as a salaried employee and as a journalist. Following World War II and the Holocaust, Rosenberg returned to Germany in the Fall of 1945. He served as the chairman of the German Federation of Labor Unions from 1962 to 1969. Rosenberg died in October 1977 at age 74 from a heart attack.

== See also ==
- Trade unions in Germany
