= German Postal Union =

Former German trade union (1949–2001)

- German Postal Union
- Deutsche Postgewerkschaf
- Merged into: Ver.di
- Formation: 1949
- Dissolved: 2001
- Type: Trade Union
- Location: Germany
- Members: 474,094 members (1998)
- Official language: German

The German Postal Union (German: Deutsche Postgewerkschaft, DPG) was a trade union representing postal workers in Germany.

The union was founded at a conference held on 29 and 30 June 1949, in Stuttgart. It initially had 140,000 members, the vast majority working for the Deutsche Bundespost. In October 1949, the union became a founder member of the German Trade Union Confederation.

In March 1990, the a German Postal Union East was founded, to cover East Germany, then in November this merged into the main union, with about 100,000 workers for the Deutsche Post of the GDR joining. By 1998, the union had 474,094 members.

Between 1989 and 1994, the Deutsche Bundespost was privatised, against the objections of the DPG. In 2001, the union merged with the German Salaried Employees' Union, Media Union, the Public Services, Transport and Traffic Union, and the Trade, Banking and Insurance Union, to form Ver.di.

== Presidents ==
1950: Carl Stenger
1971: Ernst Breit
1982: Kurt van Haaren
