= Ver.di =

Trade union in Germany

ver.di
- United Services Trade Union
- Vereinte Dienstleistungsgewerkschaft - ver.di
- Founded: 19 March 2001
- Headquarters: Berlin, Germany
- Location: Germany
- Members: 1.9 million
- Key people: Frank Werneke, president
- Subsidiaries: Ver.di Jugend
- Affiliations: DGB
- Website: www.verdi.de

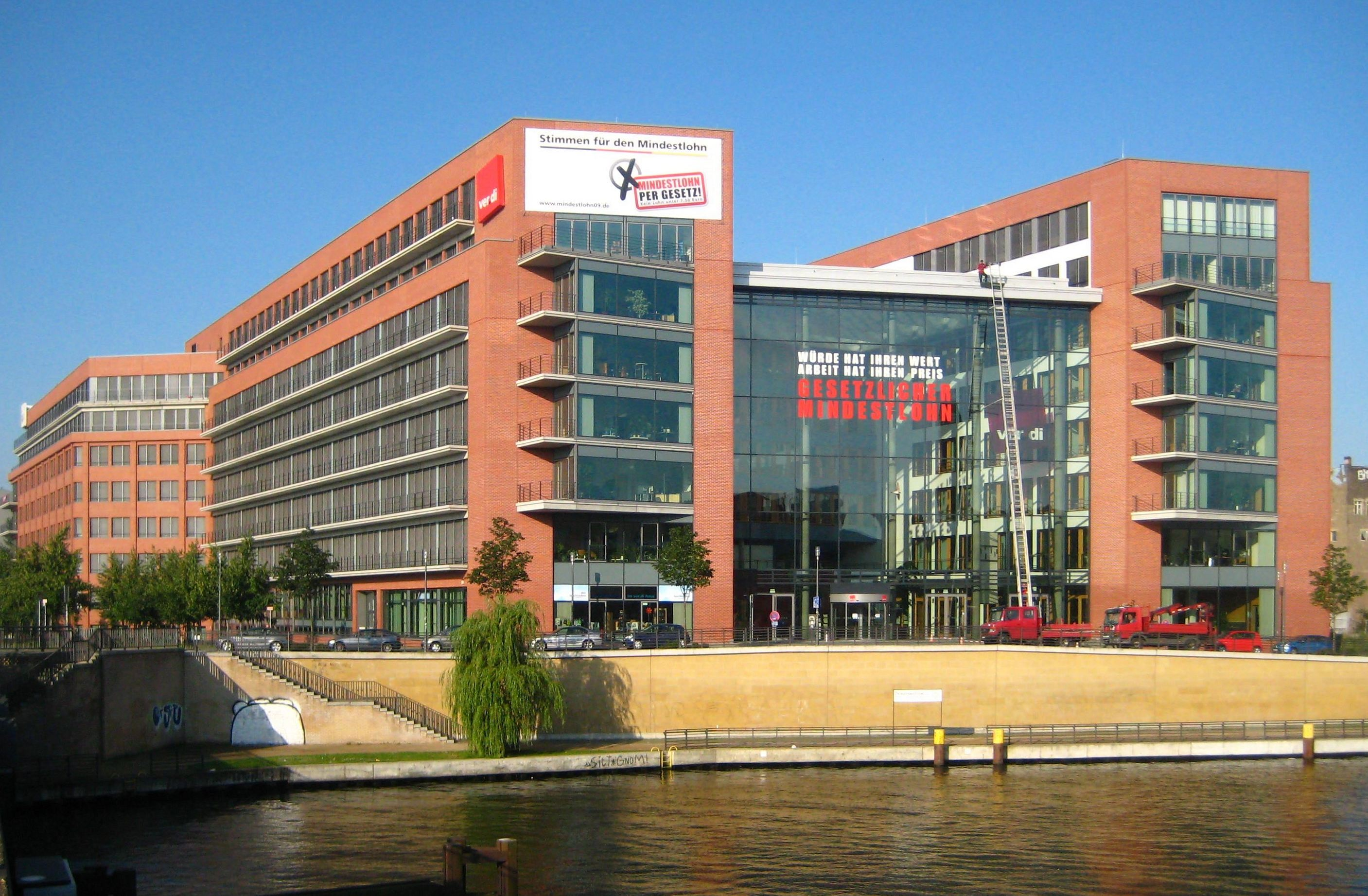
Verdi headquarters in Berlin-Mitte

Vereinte Dienstleistungsgewerkschaft (Verdi (stylized as ver.di; [ˈvɛʁdiː]); English: United Services Trade Union) is a German trade union based in Berlin, Germany. It was established on 19 March 2001 as the result of a merger of five individual unions and is a member of the German Trade Union Confederation (DGB). With around 1.9 million members, Verdi is the second largest German trade union after IG Metall. It currently employs around 3000 members of staff in Germany and has an annual income of approximately 454 million Euros obtained from membership subscriptions. The trade union is divided into 10 federal state districts and five divisions and is managed by a National Executive Board (Bundesvorstand) with nine members. Frank Bsirske was the chairman of Verdi from its founding in 2001 until September 2019, when Frank Werneke was elected.

== Establishment ==
Verdi was established in March 2001 as the result of a merger of five individual unions, all of which, other than the DAG, had previously belonged to the German Trade Union Confederation (DGB):

- German Salaried Employees' Union (DAG)
- German Postal Union (DPG)
- Trade, Banking and Insurance Union (HBV)
- Media Union (IG Medien)
- Public Services, Transport and Traffic Union (ÖTV)

The oldest forerunner of Verdi was the Association of German Printers (Verband der Deutschen Buchdrucker), which was founded in 1866.

Discussions on closer cooperation between German trade unions had already been conducted back in the 1990s. These negotiations not only involved the future founding partners of Verdi, but also the former TRANSNET (GdED), the Education and Science Workers' Union (GEW) and the Food, Beverages and Catering Union (NGG).

On 4 October 1997, the chairmen of the DAG, DPG, GEW, HBV, IG Medien and ÖTV signed the "Hamburg Declaration", in which they supported the reorganisation of the representation of trade union interests in the service sector. This resulted in the establishment of a steering committee that worked in close cooperation with the executive committees of the trade unions involved to develop the key aspects of the fusion and the structure of the future large trade union.

After the GEW had left the merger process, the heads of the DAG, DPG, HBV, IG Medien and ÖTV agreed on the merger in the German city of Magdeburg in June 1999. In autumn of the same year, they opened a joint office in Berlin and in November 1999, the delegates of the five unions held extraordinary union conferences at which they agreed to establish a transitional organisation (GO-ver.di).

The representatives of the unions involved viewed the merger as a historic step, claiming that it would bring an end to the "rivalry among unions" in the service sector. Other observers criticised the merger, with IG Metall in particular expressing its concerns that the size of Verdi may cause it to make the DGB "explode". Critics also feared that the new trade union may force its way into the original areas of responsibility of the industrial unions. The German pilots' association Vereinigung Cockpit even used the planned merger as an opportunity to end its existing cooperation with the DAG.

In spring 2000, the merger project was brought to a temporary halt after the DAG and HBV adopted different positions on Saturday work at banks. The negotiations on the new Verdi Statute were a particular cause for conflict, so much so that they even resulted in temporary warnings that the major union may fail. Some of the ÖTV rank and file believed that the new trade union did not sufficiently consider their interests and observers believed that the ÖTV may be divided by the Verdi decision. Against this background, IG Medien even went as far as to suggest a merger without the ÖTV if necessary.

In November 2000, the delegates from the DAG, DPG, HBV and IG Medien nevertheless voted in favour of the establishment of Verdi with majorities of between and 78 and 99 percent. The positive outcome of the ÖTV was the weakest with a majority of just 65 percent. Herbert Mai therefore decided not to stand for re-election as the union's Chairman. His elected successor, Frank Bsirske, was also in favour of the merger and announced that he additionally planned to run for the role of Verdi Chairman.

The final step towards the establishment of Verdi involved the merger congresses of the five member unions, which took place between 16 and 18 March 2001 and resolved to dissolve the unions with majorities of between 80 and 91 percent. At the subsequent founding congress of Verdi, which was held between 19 and 21 March 2001, the establishment of the trade union was formally completed and Verdi's first National Executive Board was elected.

In the same month, Verdi concluded its first collective agreement with Deutsche Lufthansa. A short time later, Verdi was officially accepted into the DGB.

== Organisational structure ==
Verdi's highest body is its National Congress (Bundeskongress), which convenes once every four years to stipulate the basic principles of the union policy and to elect and formally approve the actions of the National Executive Board and the Trade Union Council (Gewerkschaftsrat). The trade union itself is divided up into different levels, divisions and groups of individuals. The divisions and groups of individuals have their own organs and committees on a local, district, state and national level. This matrix system was already a controversial decision back when Verdi was founded and problems concerning the management of the trade union continued to be brought to the forefront after its establishment. The matrix system is designed to not only represent the organisation Verdi as a whole, but also the interests of the individual professions of its members. The equal treatment of men and women in all organisational units is stipulated in the Verdi Statute and has been a central topic of the trade union ever since it was first established.

=== The Trade Union Council and National Executive Board ===
Between the National Congresses, the Trade Union Council represents Verdi's highest body. The council is composed of representatives from the federal state districts, the divisions and the groups of women, young people and senior citizens. The Trade Union Council monitors compliance with the Verdi Statute, approves the union's annual budget and year-end accounts and supervises the National Executive Board.

The National Executive Board is responsible for all activities that are not restricted to the National Congress or the Trade Union Council as stipulated in the Verdi Statute. It is responsible for running Verdi's business activities and represents the trade union on an internal and external level. The National Executive Board is composed of a chairman, the Division Managers and up to five further members. The Board currently has nine members.

=== Federal state districts, districts and local levels ===
Verdi's smallest regional units are its local districts, which can be formed if several divisions exist on a regional level. These local districts are designed to support and simplify cooperation between members. The next level up from the local level is the union's districts throughout Germany, which are in turn subordinate to the federal state districts. These federal state districts decide on the regional structures and dimensions of the districts in mutual agreement, while the federal state districts themselves are set up by the Trade Union Council. Verdi currently has ten federal state districts:

- Baden-Württemberg
- Bavaria
- Berlin-Brandenburg
- Hamburg
- Hesse
- Lower Saxony / Bremen
- North (Schleswig-Holstein, Mecklenburg-West Pomerania)
- North Rhine-Westphalia
- Rhineland-Palatinate / Saarland
- Saxony, Saxony-Anhalt and Thuringia

=== Divisions and groups of individuals ===
Verdi's divisions are oriented towards the industries and sectors of its members and are responsible for the "tasks involved in the subject-specific representation of member and company-related interests". The divisions determine their own inner structures and have their own statutes, which must be approved by the Trade Union Council. Verdi currently has five divisions (Fachbereiche), formerly 13 divisions:

- A: Financial Services, Communications and Technology, Culture, Utilities and Disposal
- B: Public and Private Services, Social Insurance and Traffic
- C: Health, Social Services, Education and Science
- D: Trade
- E: Postal Services, Shipping Companies and Logistics

Specialist groups and specialist commissions can be formed within the individual divisions to particularly support and promote the specific interests of individual professions.

Alongside the divisions, the Verdi Statute also stipulates that so-called groups of individuals be established on a district, state and national level. Verdi currently has a total of eight groups of individuals:

- Young People (Ver.di Jugend)
- Senior Citizens
- Workers
- Civil Servants
- Masters, Technicians and Engineers
- Freelance Collaborators and Personally Self-Employed, Freelance or Employee-Like Individuals
- Unemployed Individuals and
- Migrants

The tasks, structure and membership of each group of individuals is regulated by guidelines that are passed by the Trade Union Council based on proposals made by different committees.

=== Membership numbers and structure ===
Verdi's total number of members decreased from 2.81 to 2.04 million between 2001 and 2014. One of the reasons behind this decrease is the union's competition with rival trade unions such as the physicians' union Marburger Bund and the pilots' association Vereinigung Cockpit. According to observers, Verdi is "comparatively good" at recruiting new members but is limited in its success when it comes to establishing loyalty among its members on a long-term basis. In fact, the battle against decreasing interest among employees and women in particular was already an issue even before the merger of the five individual unions in 2001. In 2003, member numbers dropped so low that Verdi was forced to let some of its own staff go. This was, however, also due to the fact that many structures were duplicated in the Verdi administration after the merger. In 2007, the National Congress instructed the executive board to take measures to stop or even reverse the dwindling member numbers. This led to the initiation of the "Chance 2011" (Opportunity 2011) campaign, which was continued in a similar form under the title of "Perspektive 2015" (Prospects for 2015) in 2012. As a result, Verdi representatives were able to refer to an "end to dwindling member numbers" in 2015, at least with regard to Germany's new federal states (from the former GDR). Today, it represents 200,000 employees in state and publicly listed banks alone.

Verdi has been running a member network that is open to Verdi members only since December 2008. Alongside member information and online services, the network enables members to get in touch and exchange expertise and experiences in forums. In 2012, a working platform for committees, special interest groups, shop stewards and other individuals actively involved in the running of Verdi was added to the member network. The members of this platform can use it to hold discussions in closed groups, chat and provide information.

== Tasks and objectives ==
=== Collective bargaining policy ===
Verdi is committed to using collective agreements to secure and shape working conditions for employees. In the past, Verdi argued for maintaining collective agreement unity on several occasions, claiming that it supported the assertiveness of staff and the acceptance of collective bargaining. Verdi rejected all attempts to change employees' right to strike and announced that it planned to take action against corresponding statutory limitations, even by taking cases to the German Federal Constitutional Court. Within the scope of its collective bargaining policy, Verdi particularly focuses on achieving equality between men and women. Gender mainstreaming additionally plays a role when it comes to the composition of the trade union's own executive board. Another objective of Verdi's collective bargaining policy is to bring wages and pensions in Germany's old and new federal states into line.

Verdi's collective bargaining policy has above all attracted widespread media attention due to labour disputes in the public service. In 2006, the members of the trade union accepted a new collective agreement for the Public Service of the German Federal States after having previously gone on strike over a period of three months. The Marburger Bund chose to reject the result of the negotiations at the time, leading the media to report that it was "on a collision course" with Verdi. The collective bargaining association between the two trade unions had already been dissolved in the previous year. In 2007, Verdi and the German Civil Service Federation (DBB) launched an advertising campaign costing three million Euros with the motto of "Genug gespart" (Enough saved). The aim of the campaign was to drawn more attention to the work carried out by the public service in the run-up to new collective agreement negotiations. After a wave of warning strikes and several rounds of negotiations, the parties called for conciliation in March 2008. Although this failed, Verdi ultimately agreed on a new collective agreement with the German Federal Government, the German federal states and local authorities. The trade union achieved a wage increase of eight percent, which some observers labelled a heavy burden for the public budgets. Verdi attracted a total of 50,000 new members during the trade dispute. It later managed to repeat that success in similar negotiations in 2018, with an agreement which provides for a cumulative 7.5 per cent increase in salaries over a period of 30 months and includes top-ups and extra payments designed to make the public sector a more attractive employer.

Notably, Verdi held a series of strikes at Deutsche Post in 2015 in a dispute over pay and plans for a new parcel division. Those walkouts, one of which lasted four weeks, cost the firm 100 million euros at the time.

In 2023, airports in the major German cities of Berlin, Bremen, and Hamburg all announced that no flights would depart from the airport on 13 March due to a strike for security staff organized by Verdi over a dispute in pay.

=== Educational services ===
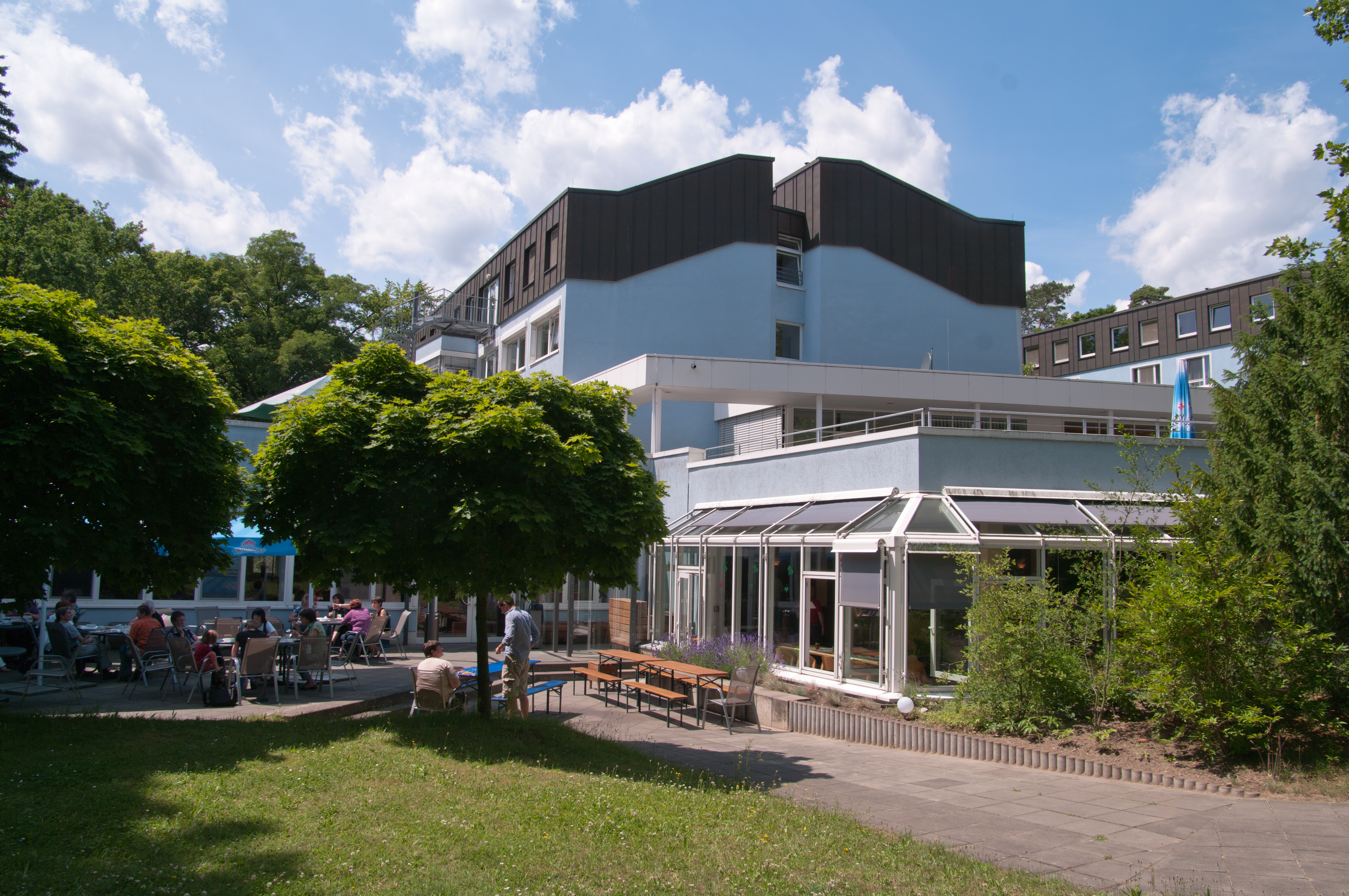
Verdi educational center "Clara Sahlberg", Berlin-Wannsee

Verdi runs a number of educational centres throughout Germany, all of which aim to support the exchange of experiences and expertise between its members. These services are particularly, but not exclusively, aimed at active works councils. The educational centres are also used as venues for job-related and general further education programmes on a wide variety of different topics. Verdi currently runs educational centres in Berlin, Bielefeld, Brannenburg, Gladenbach, Mosbach, Naumburg (Hesse), Saalfeld, Undeloh and Walsrode. It closed its site in Hörste at the end of 2015 and the building is now being used as a home for refugees.

Alongside the educational centres specified above, there are also a number of independent ver.di educational institutes that were taken over from the former German Union of Salaried Employees (DAG) in several federal states.

ver.di Bildung + Beratung Gemeinnützige GmbH

ver.di Bildung + Beratung, known as ver.di b+b for short, is Verdi's educational institution that operates throughout Germany. It is responsible for running seminars for statutory special interest groups, namely works council, staff council and Youth and Trainees Council (JAV) members, as well as members of representative bodies for disabled employees and employee representation committees. ver.di b+b has been examined and certified by the independent institute for "Learner-Oriented Quality Testing in Further Education and Training" (Lernerorientierte Qualitätstestierung in der Weiterbildung).

ver.di b+b also works as a book publishing house and publishes guidebooks, work guides and legal commentaries.

The company's head office is based in the German city of Düsseldorf. ver.di b+b is represented in 25 locations throughout Germany.

Its subsidiary "Rat.geber GmbH" advises boards and committees and runs the public bookshop at Verdi's administrative headquarters in Berlin.

=== International memberships ===
Verdi is a member of multiple global union federations such as the UNI Global Union, the International Transport Workers' Federation, the International Graphical Federation, the International Federation of Journalists and the Public Services International and several European trade union federations, namely EPSU. It is also a member of the European Movement Germany (EBD) and a partner of the Tax Justice Network.

== Publications ==
Verdi publishes a multitude of different magazines for its members. All members receive the magazine "Verdi Publik" for free eight times a year. Other Verdi publications include the media policy magazine "M – Menschen Machen Medien" (M – People Make Media), which, like the publications "Druck + Papier" (Printing + Paper) and "Kunst + Kultur" (Art + Culture), is published by the National Executive Board and the Media, Art and Industry division.

== Criticism ==
Ever since Verdi was first founded, its complex organisational structure has repeatedly been the subject of criticism: In as early as 2001, for example, the German daily newspaper Der Tagesspiegel warned readers about the threat of "losses and inefficiency due to friction". The Sunday newspaper Welt am Sonntag also reported on "frictions and budget disputes" within the trade union. The daily newspaper Die Tageszeitung claimed that Verdi's matrix model was "so complicated" that even full-time Verdi employees "had a hard time" explaining it. The weekly news magazine Stern also reported on Verdi, stating that its divisions, state associations and districts "worked against each other more than with one another". On top of these media reports, Verdi's organisation structure also received criticism from within its own ranks time and time again, so much so that a response to this criticism was factored into the "Perspektive 2015" initiative.

Critics also accused Verdi of taking a strong stand in favour of employee rights and fair wages in public but not aiming to achieve these goals on an internal level. One example was the canteen at Verdi's headquarters in Berlin, which was operated by the international catering company Sodexo. As is typical of the industry, Sodexo does not conclude industrial collective agreements but instead uses collective agreements on a company level. According to information presented by the Neue Ruhr Zeitung newspaper, the wages of employees at the German Employee Academy (DAA), which is closely linked to Verdi, were below the rate that Verdi had negotiated with rivals such as the charitable organisations AWO or Diakonie. Verdi's actions during strikes are also constantly the subject of criticism, with some reports claiming that in individual cases, employees have been forced to strike, which the trade union denied. Critics have also labelled several strikes organised by Verdi as out of proportion.

== Presidents ==
2001: Frank Bsirske
2019: Frank Werneke
