= Emil Walter =

Emil Walter may refer to:

- Emil J. Walter (1897–1984), Swiss sociologist
- Emil Walter (footballer) (1900–1952), Spanish footballer
- Emil Walter (politician) (1872–1939), Swiss politician
