= Swiss Workers' Federation =

Umbrella organization of the Swiss labor movement (1865–1920)

The Swiss Workers' Federation (German: Schweizerischer Arbeiterbund) was a national umbrella organization of the Swiss labor movement. Three successive organizations bore its name: a first federation founded in Zurich in 1865, which disappeared the same year; the Old Workers' Federation (1873–1880), whose last congress decided to found the Swiss Trade Union Federation; and the New Workers' Federation (1887–1920), which the Swiss Trade Union Federation dissolved at the end of 1920.

== History ==
=== First federation (1865) ===
The first Swiss Workers' Federation was founded in Zurich in 1865 by workers' organizations from five cantons, on the initiative of the cantonal workers' association of Glarus. It disappeared again the same year.

=== Old Workers' Federation (1873–1880) ===
In 1873 several sections of the Grütli Union, together with workers' associations and trade unions, united in Olten to form the Old Workers' Federation (Alter Arbeiterbund), which health insurance funds (Krankenkassen) later also joined. Three directing sections (Vororte; Geneva, Winterthur and Bern), six congresses and several ballots of the whole membership coordinated its activities, above all in social policy. A permanent problem for the federation was the deficit of the workers' newspaper Tagwacht. The federation had a brief heyday in 1875–1878, especially in the campaign over the federal Factory Act, with over 6,000 members in about 125 associations, mostly in eastern Switzerland. It broke up in 1880 over internal conflicts, among others between trade-union and political organizations and between Swiss and foreign members. The last congress, held in Olten from 6 to 8 November 1880, decided to dissolve the federation and to found the Swiss Trade Union Federation (SGB), and it proposed the Social Democratic Party (SP) as its political successor organization.

=== New Workers' Federation (1887–1920) ===
The New Workers' Federation (Neuer Arbeiterbund) was formed in Aarau in 1887. It brought trade unions, Grütli associations, workers' associations, Catholic and Protestant associations and health insurance funds together in one umbrella organization. This made it possible to set up a subsidized, semi-official workers' secretariat. Under the direction of Herman Greulich, with one assistant (Adjunkt) and from 1908 four, and with offices in Zurich, Biel and Geneva, the secretariat was to prepare the groundwork for social legislation. In practice, however, the workers' secretariat, opened in 1887, worked as an ombudsman's office, and the secretaries were overburdened with political mandates and trade-union work. The federation counted only the members of the associations represented at the Workers' Day (Arbeitertag), held every three years: about 100,000 at first, and over 300,000 in 1908–1914, more than half of them members of health insurance funds.

After 1900 the New Workers' Federation quickly lost importance, as the SGB and the SP grew stronger and because of ideological differences. The health insurance funds left it during the First World War, and the Christian social associations after the national strike of 1918. The SGB, the only member left, dissolved the federation at the end of 1920.

== Bibliography ==
- H. Farner, Die Geschichte des Schweizerischen Arbeiterbundes, 1923
- E. Gruner, Die Arbeiter in der Schweiz im 19. Jahrhundert, 1968
- E. Gruner (ed.), Arbeiterschaft und Wirtschaft in der Schweiz 1880–1914, 3 vols., 1987–1988
