= Marie Hüni =

- Born: 15 April 1872; Uetikon, Canton of Zürich
- Died: 2 September 1949; Schiers, Graubünden
- Occupations: political activist and journalist
- Political party: SP
- Spouse: Emil Walter (1872-1939)
- Children: Emil J. Walter (1897-1984)
- Parent(s): Hans Jakob Hüni; Maria Meier

Marie Hüni (between 1896 and 1910 Marie Walter-Hüni : 15 April 1872 - 2 September 1949) was a Swiss trades unionist and women's rights activist.

== Life ==
Marie Hüni was born and grew up in Uetikon, a small town on the north shore of Lake Zürich. Her father, Hans Jakob Hüni, was an impecunious teacher. She prepared to follow him into the teaching profession, attending the teaching training college at nearby Küsnacht. In 1896 Marie Hüni married Emil Walter, a fellow student, who was also embarking on a career as a teacher: he later became better known as a political activist, notably as a leader in the so-called Grütli Union. It is believed that Emil Walter played a crucial role in awakening his wife's political consciousness, although the couple were later, in 1910, divorced.

In 1908 Marie Walter replaced Margarethe Faas-Hardegger as the women workers' secretary of the Swiss Federation of Trade Unions (SGB) (SGB). She retained this position through a turbulent period, till 1924. Under her leadership the women's workers' organisations were increasingly integrated into the rest of Swiss labour movement, especially after 1918.

Between 1909 and 1918 she edited the newspaper "Vorkämpferin". She was energetic as a socialist journalist and agistator. In 1910 she organised at St. Gallen the first congress for working women in 1910. Also in 1910, she was the Swiss delegate to the Second International Congress of Socialist Women at Copenhagen. After 1918 the political mood became increasingly polarised, and Hüni was seen as representing the moderate right wing of the Social Democratic Party, and she lost influence. After 1924 he focus switched more completely to education and welfare work.
