= Emil Walter (politician) =

Swiss politician (1872–1939)

- Born: 29 January 1872; Winterthur, Zürich, Switzerland
- Died: 19 January 1939 (aged 66); Zurich, Switzerland
- Occupations: Teacher; Journalist; Political activist
- Political party: SP
- Spouses: Marie Hüni (m. 1896); Anna Frida Isler Schumacher (m. 1911); Fanny Angst Arnold (m. 1930)
- Children: Emil J. Walter

Emil Walter (29 January 1872 – 19 January 1939) was a Swiss Grütli leader and Social Democratic Party politician.

== Life ==
Emil Walter was born to a Protestant couple in Winterthur, already becoming a centre for the burgeoning Swiss railway industry, and a major industrial town more generally. Emil's father, Albert Walter, was a secondary school teacher originally from Munich, who as a young man had participated actively in the uprisings of 1848. The boy grew up in an orphanage in the town, and went on to attend the teacher-training academy at nearby Küsnacht between 1887 and 1891. One of his fellow students was Marie Hüni whom he would later marry. After a further period of study in Zürich, between 1895 and 1903 he worked as a secondary school teacher in Winterthur. In 1903 he co-founded the "Winterthurer Arbeiterzeitung" ("Winterthur Workers' Newspaper"), working as the newspaper's editor till 1909.

In 1896 Walter married the trades union and feminist activist Marie Hüni. Between 1898 and 1903 Emil Walter served as a town councillor in Winterthur, and from 1902 till 1920 he served as a councillor at the cantonal level. He worked as a part-time council employee between 1903 and 1910 with responsibilities involving the police service.

Between 1908 and 1911 Walter edited Der Grütlianer, the newspaper of the old Grütli Union, originally a wide-ranging workers' rights and welfare organisation which had become progressively more political and tentatively merged with the Swiss Social Democratic Party in 1901 (but would break away again and become a standalone political party in 1916). Within the party at a national level, between 1912 and 1915 he was vice-president of the Grütli Union, also serving in 1916/17 as its president: in connection with his Grütli offices, he was in addition a member of the national leadership committee of the Social Democratic Party. Between 1911 and 1920 Walter combined his political duties with work as a secondary school teacher in Zürich.

Between 1920 and 1929 Walter was employed by the Cantonal (Zürich region) council, in charge of finance and later, from 1923, in charge of building development. He also served as a director of the increasingly important Cantonal Electricity Company and of its successor, the Northeast Switzerland Power Company (Nordostschweizerische Kraftwerke / NOK).

== Conclusion ==
Emil Walter played an important role in the Winterthur labour movement until he was deselected on account of his attitude to the building workers' strike in 1909 and voted off the council in 1910. He was one of the leaders of the Grülianers while at the same time obtaining support from the "bourgeois" parties in elections.

Walter also wrote for various publications to advocate introduction of proportional representation.

== Personal ==
Emil Walter was married three times. His first marriage, to Marie Hüni, ended in divorce in 1910, after which their two children were raised by Marie. One of those children was Emil Jakob Walter (1897-1984) who later achieved eminence as an academic ("Wissenschaftssoziologie"). Emil Walter's second marriage, in 1911, was to the primary school teacher Anna Schumacher. His third marriage, in 1930, was to Fanny Arnold.
