= Emil J. Walter =

Swiss sociologist (1897–1984)

- Born: 13 December 1897; Winterthur
- Died: 10 March 1984 (aged 86); Zürich
- Occupation: Sociologist
- Parents: Emil Walter; Marie Hüni

Emil Jakob Walter (13 December 1897 – 10 March 1984) was a Swiss sociologist.

Walter was professor at the Handelshochschule St. Gallen. As a positivist, Walter tried to apply the methods of natural science to sociological and psychological issues. Walter also wrote for scientific (Vierteljahrsschrift der Naturforschenden Gesellschaft in Zürich and Synthese) as well as social democratic periodicals (Rote Revue).

== Life ==
Walter was son of Emil Walter who was part of the Grütli Union and of feminist and labor union member Marie Hüni. From 1916 until 1921 Walter studied chemistry at the University of Zurich. In 1923 he married Alexandra Kraus. In 1924 he became a Doctor of Philosophy. Initially he worked as a chemist for Aluminium Industrie Aktien company in Chippis. In 1929 he married Rosa Marie Pohl. From 1930 until 1958 he worked as the main teacher for chemistry and physics at the Gewerbeschule Zürich.

From 1934 until 1962 Walter was social democratic borough councilor in the city of Zurich. 1941 he married Annemarie Locher.

In 1949 he was a Privatdozent for science history at the University of Zurich. In 1951 he became visiting lecturer at the Universität St. Gallen and from 1957 until 1968 he was extraordinary professor for sociology at the same institute.

== Work ==
In addition to his internationally adopted Monography Walter wrote for many years for a variety of newspapers and magazines. Among other things Walter focused on scientific topics with political relevance such as global warming.

== Publications (selection) ==
- Marxismus oder Bolschewismus? Olten: W. Trösch, 1919.
- Freigeldwirtschaft oder Sozialismus? Zur Kritik der Freiland-Freigeldbewegung. Zürich: Genossenschaft Unionsbuchhandlung 1920.
- Der Kapitalismus. Einführung in die marxistische Wirtschaftstheorie. Zürich: Oprecht & Helbing, 1930.
- Das System der Wissenschaften. 1934.
- Aufriss der Logistik. Vierteljahrsschrift der Naturforschenden Gesellschaft in Zürich. Vol. 81 (1936), pp. 91–106.
- Logistik, logische Syntax und Mathematik. In: Vierteljahrsschrift der Naturforschenden Gesellschaft in Zürich. Vol. 82 (1937), pp. 1–20.
- Europäischer Sozialismus: Rückblick und Ausblick. Zürich/New York: Verlag Der Aufbruch, 1942.
- Erforschte Welt: Die wichtigsten Ergebnisse der naturwissenschaftlichen Forschung. Sammlung Dalp, Vol. 5. Bern: Francke, 1946 (1. Auflage) and 1953 (2nd edition).
- With Ernst Boller and Donald Brinkmann: Einführung in die Farbenlehre. Sammlung Dalp, Band 10. Bern: Francke, 1947.
- Psychologische Grundlagen der geschichtlichen und sozialen Entwicklung. Internationale Bibliothek für Psychologie und Soziologie, Vol. 2. Zürich: Pan-Verlag, 1947.
