= 1918 Swiss general strike =

Swiss labor action

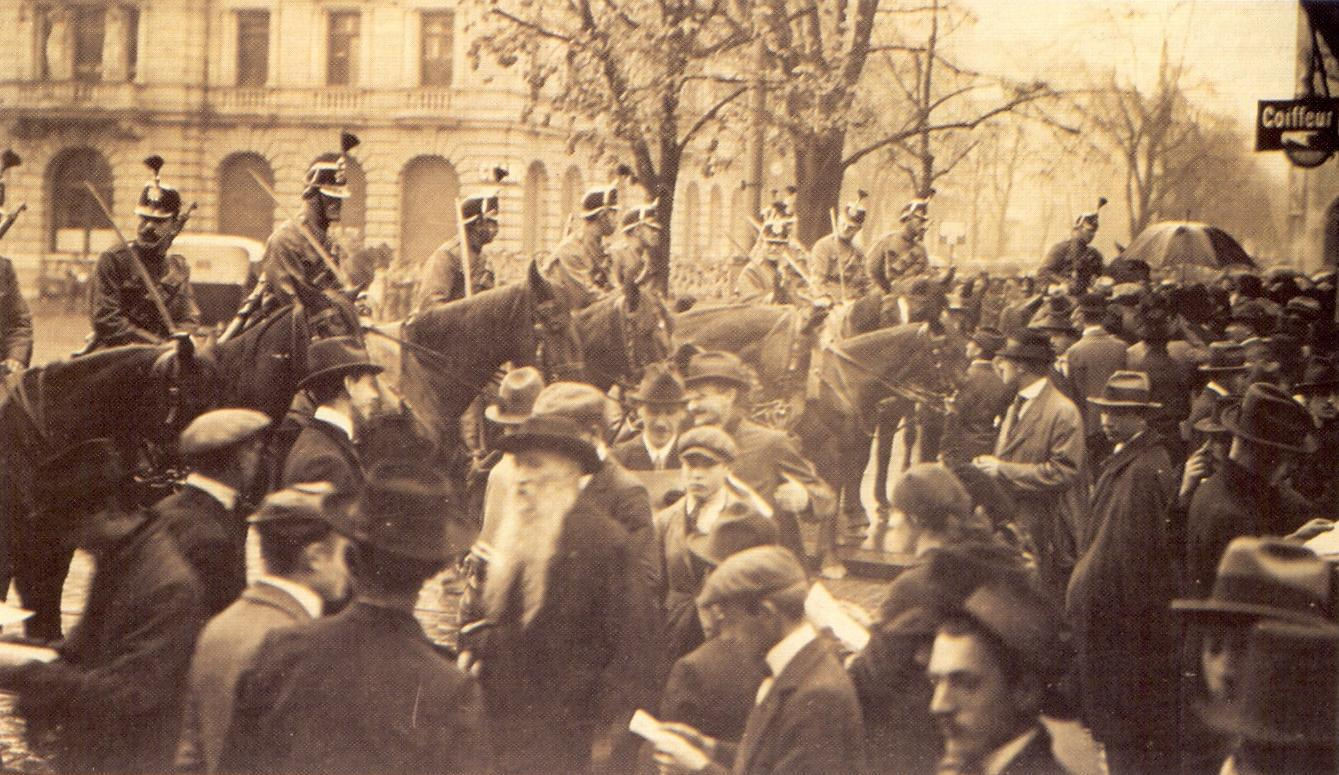
Confrontation between strikers and soldiers in Zurich

The 1918 Swiss general strike (German: Landesstreik) took place from November 12 to 14 and involved around 250,000 workers.

== Background ==
Although Switzerland remained neutral during World War I, it did mobilize its army. The military called 220,000 men into active service. The Swiss labor movement initially supported the cause of national defense.

The war caused significant economic privation in the country. It also deepened the rift between workers on the one side and business and farmers on the other. The war caused a considerable spike in the price of consumer goods. Bread prices, for instance, doubled between 1914 and 1918. Farmers and many businesses profited from this, but workers suffered. Their wages did not rise with prices. Average industrial real wages sank by a quarter. Military mobilization further contributed to workers' distress. Workers drafted into the military were not compensated for lost wages and soldiers' pay was much lower than industrial workers' wages.

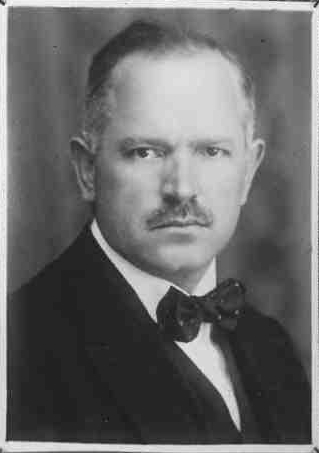
Robert Grimm

In February 1918 at a meeting in Olten, leaders of the Swiss Socialist Party (SPS), the country's labor unions, and the socialist press decided to create the Olten Action Committee (OAK). Its purpose was to provide unified leadership to the labor movement and the socialist party. It was led by Robert Grimm, the editor of the socialist newspaper Berner Tagwacht and a member of the lower house of parliament, the National Council. The other members were Friedrich Schneider and Rosa Bloch as representatives of the SPS and Karl Dürr, Konrad Ilg, August Huggler, and Franz Reichmann as representatives of various labor unions.

== Run-up ==
On November 5, 1918, the Federal Council, Switzerland's executive, deployed two infantry regiments and two cavalry brigades to Zurich. It claimed that economic and political instability could give radicals, particularly foreigners in Zurich, the opportunity to cause disturbances and to attempt a revolution and that the soldiers were needed to maintain order. The troops marched into Zurich on November 7.

This move angered the city's labor organizations who accused the government of seeking to establish a military dictatorship. The OAK also protested the government's decision. It called for a one-day strike in nineteen cities on November 9, a Saturday. The strikes remained peaceful. They only took place in some of the nineteen cities, because labor organizers in the others felt that they had not been given enough time to prepare and consequently did not heed the Committee's call.

In Zurich, however, labor leaders considered the Committee's one-day strike overly cautious and vowed to continue the struggle until the Army withdrew from the city. The next day, a Sunday, Zurich's labor movement had made plans to celebrate the first anniversary of the Russian October Revolution. The same day, news of the German November Revolution and the toppling of the German emperor reached Zurich. The military proscribed all public demonstrations. When troops dispersed a crowd on the square Münsterplatz, the resulting disorder left four protesters injured and one soldier dead. Protesters reassembled on the Milchbuck and were attacked by cavalry bearing sabers, forcing them to flee.

== General strike ==
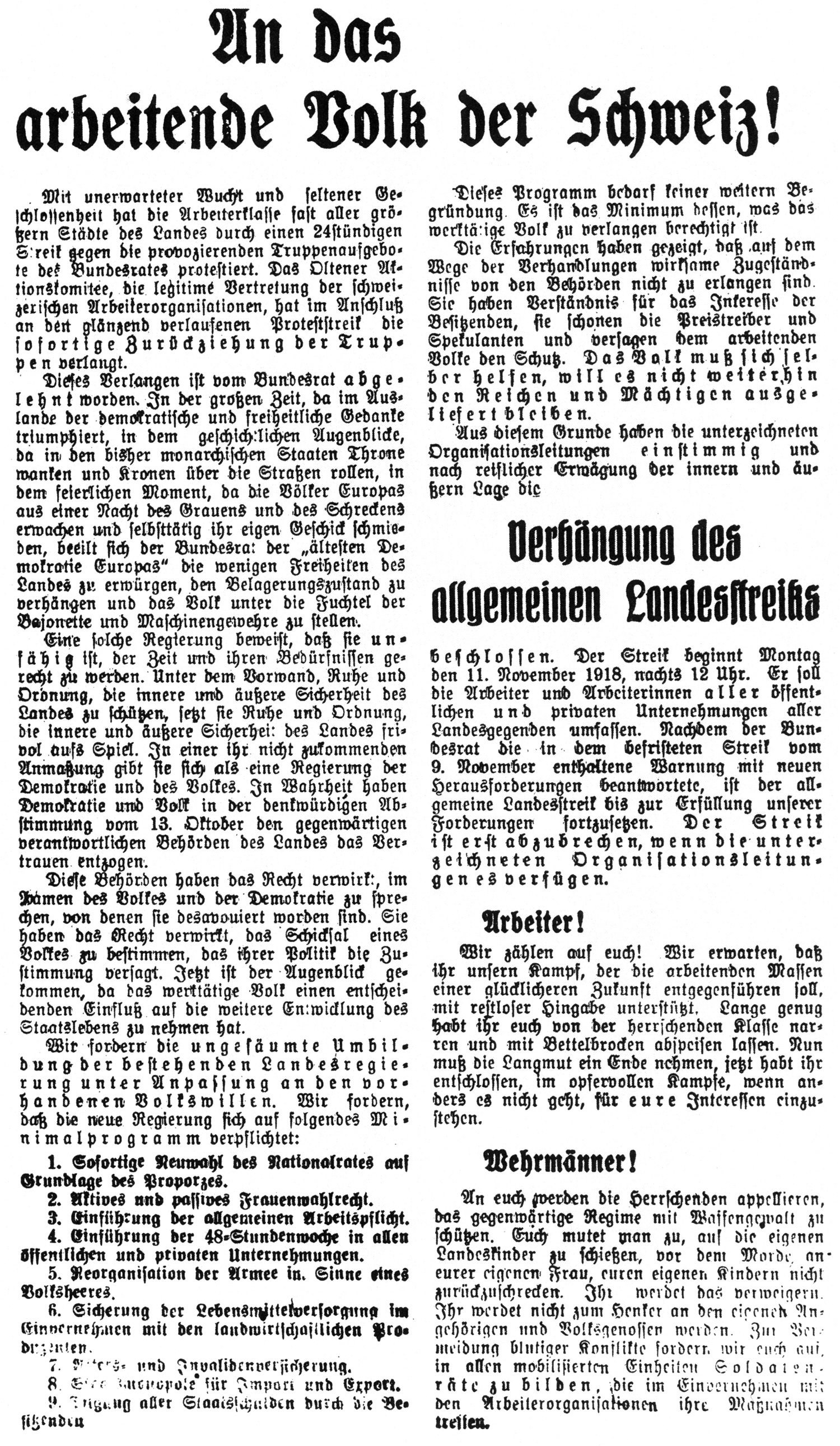
Leaflet issued by the OAK calling for the general strike

The altercations in Zurich forced the OAK to act. Its members discussed their options in a long and tumultuous meeting. The Committee issued a proclamation entitled "To the Working People of Switzerland". The proclamation called for a general strike beginning on 12 November and made nine demands:

- new national council elections with proportional representation,
- women's suffrage and women's right to hold office,
- a general obligation to work,
- the 48-hour week,
- reorganizing the military into a people's army,
- improving the food supply,
- old age and disability insurance,
- establishing a state monopoly on foreign trade, and
- forcing the rich to pay off the country's sovereign debt.

The Federal Council immediately rejected the Committee's demands. It left the door open to social reforms, but insisted they could only be accomplished through legal procedures. It called on the Swiss people to side with the government. The government also placed all federal employees under military law, subject to punishment if they participated in the strike. It mobilized the Army, some 110,000 soldiers. Furthermore, the Swiss government decided to close down the Russian diplomatic mission in Berne. Its staff, including the mission chief Jan Berzin, were escorted to the German border on November 12.

The general strike started as planned on Tuesday, November 12. Participation was greatest in the industrial areas of German-speaking northern and eastern Switzerland. In Zurich and Basel workers were particularly enthusiastic. Even workers who might not otherwise have taken part in the strike, particularly those in rural areas, were prevented from commuting to work because trains did not run. In the French-speaking Romandy, strike participation was far lower, because the OAK had less influence there. French speakers exhibited more support for the Allies in World War I and some suspected Grimm of harboring sympathy for the Germans. There were no major incidents on the first day of the strike.

On November 12, both chambers of the Swiss legislature assembled for a special session, with some delegates requiring military assistance to reach Berne. By a vote of 136 to 15, the Federal Assembly passed several measures designed to break the strike after two days of debates. Only socialist delegates voted against the measures. The OAK was given an ultimatum to call off the strike by 5 pm on November 13. At 2 am on November 14 the Committee and the socialist leadership complied, calling on workers to resume their work on Friday, November 15. The Committee's decision was unanimous, but for the dissent of Grimm and Schneider, a labor leader from Basel.

Soldiers guarding the Federal Palace in Berne, which houses the national legislature and executive

The strike had already been called off when it claimed its first lives. In Grenchen, a town in the Canton of Solothurn, protesting workers were tearing up railroad tracks and soldiers shot at them. Three died and more were injured. In Basel and Zurich, workers initially refused to believe news of the strike's end. Schneider traveled to Basel to convince them to return to work. In Zurich, the labor movement, led by Ernst Nobs, was incensed by the decision to end the strike and considered ignoring it. Eventually, moderates prevailed, but in some factories work did not resume until the next Monday.

== Aftermath and legacy ==
The 1918 general strike was the most significant domestic crisis in Switzerland since the Sonderbund War of 1847 and the formation of the Swiss federal state in 1848.

In early 1919, twenty-one leaders were put on trial for incitement to mutiny. Grimm, Schneider, and Fritz Platten were convicted for their involvement in the publication and dissemination of the pamphlet calling for the general strike. Specifically, the proclamation contained a call for soldiers to ignore orders to shoot workers. They were sentenced to six months in prison. Nobs was convicted because of a different text he published which was found to be subversive. He was sentenced to a four-week prison term. All four served their sentences, while the other seventeen defendants were acquitted.

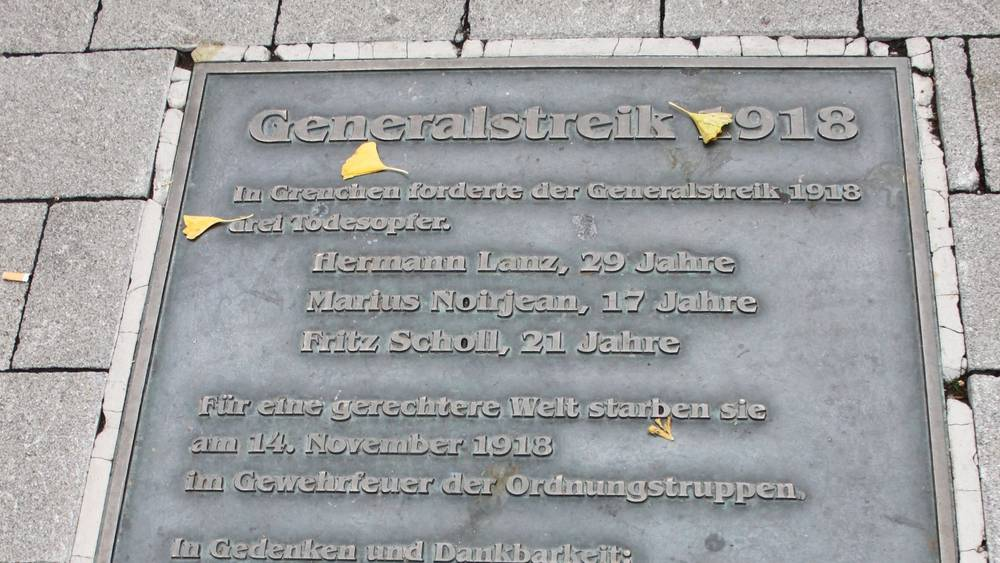
Commemorative plaque in Grenchen

The strike did not feature in many works of literary fiction. It plays a part in Meinrad Inglin's Schweizerspiegel, which was published in 1938. Les signes parmi nous, written by Charles-Ferdinand Ramuz in 1919, tells the story of a Bible salesman who travels throughout Switzerland and is led to believe that the Apocalypse is coming because of the Spanish flu and the general strike. Jean-Paul Zimmermann's L'étranger dans la ville, written in 1919 but only published in 1931, deals with the way the strike was perceived in the town of Le Locle. In film, the strike was the subject of the 2018 docufiction Generalstreik 1918: Die Schweiz am Rande eines Bürgerkriegs, directed by Hansjürg Zumstein, which praises the sense of responsibility exhibited both by labor leaders and government officials to avoid a bloodshed.
