= Hermann Haller =

Hermann Haller may refer to:

- Hermann Haller (film editor) (1909–1985)
- Hermann Haller (sculptor) (1880–1950)
- Hermann Haller (composer) (1914–2002)
- Hermann Haller (biologist)
