= Margarethe Hardegger =

Swiss women's rights activist (1882–1963)

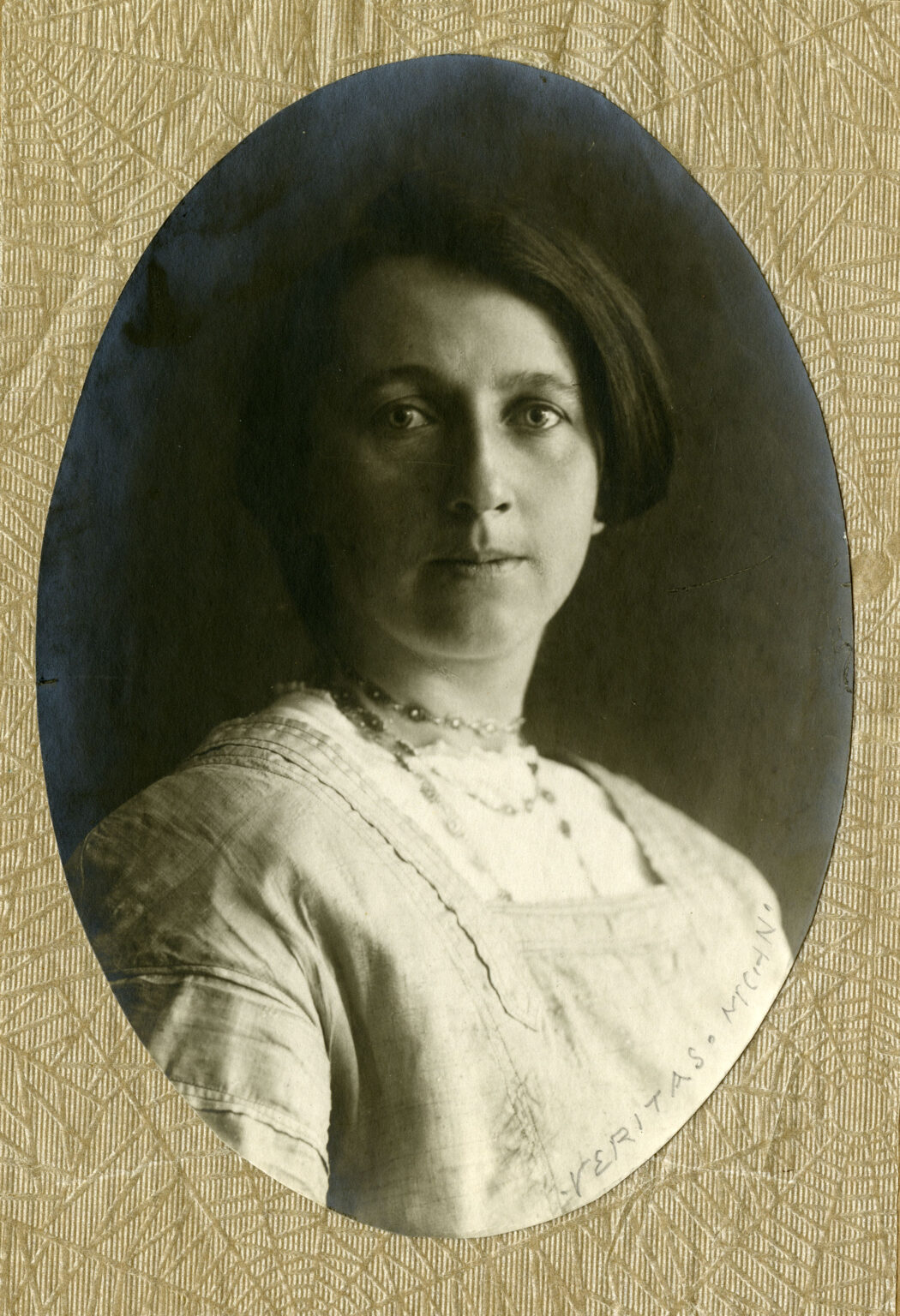
- Hardegger in 1909

1st Women's Secretary of the Swiss Trade Union Federation
- In office 1905–1909
- President: Karl Zingg
- Preceded by: Position established
- Succeeded by: Marie Hüni

Personal details
- Born: 20 February 1882 Bern, Switzerland
- Died: 23 September 1963 (aged 81) Minusio, Ticino, Switzerland
- Party: Social Democratic Party of Switzerland (until 1918)
- Other political affiliations: Socialist League (1908–1914)
- Spouses: August Faas (m. 1903; div. 1912); Hans Brunner (m. 1950; died 1960)
- Children: 2
- Education: University of Bern
- Occupation: Union representative, journalist
- Known for: Abortion-rights activism

Margarethe Hardegger (20 February 1882 – 23 September 1963) was a Swiss socialist feminist and trade union activist. A leading figure in the women's labour movement in Switzerland, she became the first women's secretary of the Swiss Trade Union Federation (SGB) and provided assistance to hundreds of working women throughout the 1900s. She faced tensions with the SGB leadership over her radical politics, particularly due to her advocacy of access to birth control. By 1909, she had left the union and established the Socialist League together with Gustav Landauer, although she later broke away from the organisation due to Landauer's criticism of her feminist views. In 1915, she was arrested and put on trial for assisting in illegal abortions. The prosecution attempted to indict her over an alleged profit motive for the abortions, but she was able to convince the court that she was motivated by solidarity and received the minimum sentence for abortion assistance. After her release, she established a commune and provided aid to refugees from the dictatorships of Europe. She remained active in the Swiss anarchist movement, as well as women's rights and anti-war movements, until the end of her life.

== Biography ==
=== Early life ===
Margarethe Hardegger was born in Bern, Switzerland, on 20 February 1882. She was the daughter of a telegraph operator and a midwife, and raised in a lower middle class household in a working class neighbourhood of Bern. Inspired by her mother's social work at a maternity home, Hardegger sought to become a doctor, but her parents convinced her to take up an apprenticeship as a switchboard operator. After coming of age, she married August Faas, from whom she took the name Faas-Hardegger. Together they had two daughters. With her husband's support, she enrolled at the University of Bern and began studying law. At university, she became involved in left-wing politics and joined the Swiss labour movement. Over time, she was drawn towards feminism, syndicalism and libertarian socialism.

=== Trade union organising ===
In 1903, Hardegger co-founded the Bern Textile Union. By this time, women in the Swiss textile industry had united into the Women Workers' Federation (German: Verband schweizerischer Arbeiterinnenvereine; VSA), which affiliated itself with the Swiss Trade Union Federation (German: Schweizerischer Gewerkschaftsbund; SGB) in 1904. The following year, Hardegger was appointed as the first women's secretary of the SGB.

When she introduced herself to local trade unions, Hardegger said she would use her position to represent women when they had complaints about their working or living conditions that they felt they could not confide to men. Hardegger believed that the biggest obstacle to the development of the labour movement was the lack of trade union organisation for women, which she aimed to remedy by recruiting more women into the SGB, with the ultimate goal of overthrowing capitalism. She spent the subsequent years organising trade unions and consumer cooperatives, giving lectures and contributing to the working women's publications. As a union representative, she opened her home to women to bring to her their complaints about financial difficulties, domestic abuse and birth control; she reported that about 500 women visited her each year. She advocated for direct action when she considered it necessary and often ignored organisational protocol. In 1906, the SGB executive briefly dismissed her from her position for her radical politics, but it was soon forced to reinstate her when leading trade unionists intervened. During this period, she often travelled to the cities of Munich and Berlin, where she came into contact with the German anarchist movement.

She began publication of the monthly German language magazine Die Vorkämpferin in 1906 and its French language counterpart L'Exploitée in 1907. The two papers became the official organs of the VSA and each grew to circulate about 2,400 copies. In these journals, Hardegger denounced the exploitation of women in the workplace, criticised marriage and the criminalisation of prostitution, campaigned for women's suffrage in Switzerland, and advocated for safe access to birth control and the decriminalisation of abortion. Her vocal advocacy of birth control was unique among Swiss feminists of the time, most of whom refused to discuss the subject or advocated instead for sexual continence. She criticised the state for demanding women have more children, while it failed to support women in raising those children. To further her birth control activism, she established a neo-Malthusian group in Geneva, through which she called for women to "give the state fewer children; fewer slaves – fewer soldiers!" Through L'Exploitée, she helped more than 200 women procure contraceptives. She also suggested that the SGB hold information meetings about contraception, but her proposals were rejected by the SGB executive. Lectures she gave on birth control and the abolition of marriage were condemned by the liberal press, who described her as a "priestess of free love". Her radical feminism again brought her into conflict with the executive, which attempted to dismiss her for a second time in 1908, but she was again reinstated following intervention by her fellow trade unionists.

In early 1907, Hardegger attended a trade union meeting of women workers at a cigar factory in Yverdon. When the company dismissed their union leaders, the women went on strike to demand they be reinstated. Hardegger condemned the factory's male workers when they broke the strike, having been offered a pay rise, and given the protection of the Swiss Army. When the company blacklisted the women workers and shut down their child care facilities, Hardegger called for a boycott of the company's cigars. She solicited support from the anarcho-syndicalists of the Romandy Workers' Union Federation, leading to the establishment of a cigar cooperative by the women workers. The boycott was brought to an end in 1909, when the dismissed workers were reinstated and their trade union recognised.

By this time, the SGB had reorganised along the lines of industrial unionism and revoked its recognition of the Women Workers' Federation. That year, Hardegger resigned her post as women's secretary. The union executive invited her to re-apply for her post, but she refused, so they instead offered her a monthly salary in recognition of her work for the union. In April 1909, she resigned as editor of Die Vorkämpferin, declaring that her political philosophy had radicalised to such an extent that she felt she was no longer an appropriate fit for the position. She was replaced as the women's secretary of the SGB by Marie Hüni, who broke from Hardegger's radicalism, declaring her belief that she would use her position to reinforce the primary role of women as mothers and to agitate against women working from home. At a congress of the Women Workers' Federation, Hardegger addressed the issue of women working from home in rural areas by advocating for more intensive farming. This would be her last appearance as a leading member of the Swiss labour movement. By this time, L'Exploitée had gone bankrupt and shut down. The SGB continued publication of Die Vorkämpferin until 1916, when it was taken over by the Social Democratic Party of Switzerland (SP). The women's secretariat of the SGB was eventually abolished in 1924.

=== Socialist League activities ===
In August 1908, Hardegger began an affair with the German anarchist Gustav Landauer, who described her as his "bridge to the world". By this time, she was already a convinced anarchist. She divorced her husband and returned to exclusively using her maiden name. Together with Landauer, Hardegger co-founded the Socialist League (German: Sozialistischer Bund), a social anarchist organisation which sought to establish a new social order based on a decentralised system of self-governing communes and voluntary associations. She also co-edited the League's official publication, Der Sozialist, which further developed her libertarian socialist political philosophy beyond her previous focus on trade unionism. When discussing with Landauer whether to describe their editing collective as "socialist" or "anarchist", Hardegger settled on calling it a "revolutionary circle", although this descriptor was later dropped. Through the paper, Hardegger adopted the philosophy of guild socialism and grew increasingly critical of authoritarian socialism. She advocated for cooperative forms of self-help, which she contrasted with the "snide hollowness of the 'revolutionaries' [who] postpone everything to the great day of the proletarian dictatorship". On at least one occasion, she wrote under the male pseudonym of "Mark Harda". Hardegger addressed anti-capitalism at a practical level, in contrast with the more theoretical articles written by Landauer, and was more supportive of technological development than her counterpart.

Over time, Hardegger split with Landauer over her support for women's rights, including free love, paid maternity leave and women's suffrage. By the early months of 1909, they had broken up; Hardegger then began a relationship with Erich Mühsam. In April 1909, Landauer rejected an article by Hardegger about women's sexuality, the abolition the nuclear family and communal child raising, which had shown the influence of the radical psychoanalyst Otto Gross. He expressed abject disgust for her proposals, describing them as "filth" and "madness", and accused her of being "infected" by Marxism. He asked her to remain silent about her radical feminism and requested that he convert the themes of the article into a dialogue between a father and a daughter (respectively representing himself and her). According to her biographer, the Swiss historian Regula Bochsler, she was so upset by Landauer's insults that she fell ill. Historian Jesse Cohn later described Landauer's letter to Hardegger as "strange" and "cruel". Hardegger herself called Landauer's criticism "gruesomely harsh", to which he responded by claiming it had been for her own benefit. In December 1910, Hardegger published a poetic article in Der Sozialist, in which she depicted a girl expressing grief over her absent father. She subsequently slipped into a depression and withdrew inward, finding herself no longer able to communicate with Landauer. By 1913, she had cut off contact with Landauer. Hardegger ultimately left the Socialist League in 1914.

In March 1912, Hardegger was arrested alongside the Swiss anarchist Ernst Frick, who had been found guilty of derailing a train in October 1908 and assaulting its driver for being a strikebreaker. Hardegger was implicated in Frick's attack, as she had provided Frick with a false alibi. Hardegger was charged with perjury and imprisoned, but was released soon after. Upon returning home, in 1914, she established a commune. She lived there with her children and a small number of other residents, with whom she held the property under common ownership, collectively maintaining the household and cultivating its garden.

=== Abortion assistance ===
Following the outbreak of World War I, Hardegger received a new influx of visitors seeking her expertise in sexual and reproductive health. She provided women with information on contraception and abortion medication, and even ordered and delivered it to some of them herself; Hardegger had previously had an abortion herself. As she was inexperienced in carrying out abortions, she solicited a medical examiner to secretly perform abortions in her home; at the time, abortion was illegal in the canton of Bern, although it was widely practised in the canton of Geneva. One of her clients was reported and testified against her in court, leading to an investigation uncovering numerous illegal abortions that were assisted by Hardegger. In 1915, she was arrested on charges of aiding and abetting abortions. She spent two months in jail, under interrogation by police, who searched her house and confiscated any letters she received. With numerous witness statements against her, she submitted a letter to the criminal court in which she explained her motives. She believed that, as a socialist, it was her duty to protect poor women who feared motherhood, many of whom had previously resorted to dangerous self-induced abortions or who had begged her for help. She declared she had a self-imposed responsibility to help them, drawing on her religious upringing which commanded that she "love thy neighbour". Acknowledging that her actions were illegal, she criticised the existing "medieval" abortion laws, which she considered to be unjustified.

Hardegger's attempt to defend herself was condemned by the public prosecutor Fritz Raaflaub, who denounced her as a "backstairs doctor" and accused her of having a profit motive. Raaflaub's indictment of Hardegger depicted her as an intelligent woman who had been negatively influenced by anarchists, directing her against the state and bringing her into criminal activity; it alleged that she had received large amounts of money in exchange for the abortion assistance. She repeatedly denied accepting any money and insisted that she had assisted in the abortions out of sympathy for the women's situations. Raaflaub's accusations were backed by the liberal press, with Der Bund depicting her as enjoying her "medicalising", while Berner Tagwacht denounced her as a threat to public safety. The idea of Hardegger being motivated by solidarity, which would have led her to render abortion assistance without charge, was never considered. Gynaecologist Hans Guggisberg, when called to the stand as an expert witness, used the courtroom to criticise amateur abortions and discuss the severe abortion-induced injuries his hospital had dealt with. He emphasised his belief that abortion laws should be upheld and that abortionists should be punished severely, while appealing for legislators to trust medical professionals to determine their methods for providing healthcare. Hardegger's co-defendants, two women who had sought abortions from her, described the process as a frightening, traumatic experience; one of them had suffered an infection from the operation. Co-residents of Hardegger's commune were also interrogated about the abortions, but claimed never to have seen them taking place. Hardegger's partner Heinrich Wagner stated that he had not known anything about abortions taking place on the commune.

The Bern criminal court ultimately decided to hold a public trial, in which a jury of lay judges would reach a verdict. Hardegger attempted to prevent this, as she was already embarrassed by the public spectacle the case had caused. She worried that, if she had to appear before lay judges, she would feel obliged to "die on [her] feet" and justify her own conviction in a way that was understandable to the public. When her public trial was held on 26–27 August 1915, she attempted to justify her provisioning of abortion assistance, while also pleading for acquittal. She was found guilty of abetting abortion, but was acquitted of the alleged commercial motives, and given the minimum sentence of one year in prison. One of her co-defendants was acquitted and the other was released on probation.

=== Later life ===
In 1918, Hardegger left the Social Democratic Party and ceased her activities in party politics. She and her partner Hans Brunner established a commune in Zurich; then, in 1919, they established another commune in Villino Graziella, near Monte Verità in Ticino. Their communal experiment lasted until 1925, when it collapsed. After the commune dissolved, Hardegger and Brunner (whom she later married) ran a carpentry shop as a family business. Hardegger continued living in Ticino, where her daughter Olga opened a maternity clinic. Following the rise of Nazi Germany, she provided aid to German communists fleeing political repression. She also provided aid to Spanish Republican refugees who had fled the Francoist dictatorship during the Spanish Civil War. During World War II, Hardegger campaigned for peace and for the abolition of the Swiss Army.

Hardegger continued to participate in the Swiss anarchist movement, women's rights movement and anti-war movement until the end of her life. During the 1950s, she involved herself in the campaign for women's suffrage in Switzerland. In the spring of 1963, she participated in an Easter March for Nuclear Disarmament, which marched from Lausanne to Geneva. She died later that year, on 23 September 1963, in Minusio. Hardegger's correspondence with Landauer has been archived in the International Institute of Social History (IISH) in Amsterdam. In 2022, a football club named after Hardegger was established in Lausanne.

== Bibliography ==
- Bochsler, Regula (2021). "Margarethe Hardegger". Historical Dictionary of Switzerland (in German).
- Cohen-Skalli, Cedric; Pisano, Libera, eds. (2023). "Gustav Landauer's Timeline". Skepsis and Antipolitics: The Alternative of Gustav Landauer. Brill. pp. xxiii–xxvi. ISBN 978-90-04-51556-7.
- Clément, Nathan (13 July 2024). "Le FC Hardegger, un club lausannois qui (s')engage contre le fascisme" [FC Hardegger, a Lausanne club committed to fighting fascism]. Blick (in Swiss French). ISSN 1013-0667.
- Cohn, Jesse (2010). "Sex and the anarchist unconscious: A brief history". Sexualities. 13 (4): 413–431. doi:10.1177/1363460710370649. ISSN 1363-4607.
- Deuber-Mankowsky, Astrid (2018). "Herbs and Weeds: Benjamin on Popularity, Using the Example of Switzerland". Positions. 26 (1): 59–76. doi:10.1215/10679847-4263110.
- Gallin, Dan; Horn, Pat (2005). Organizing informal women workers (Report). Gender Policy Report. United Nations Research Institute for Social Development – via Global Labour Institute.
- Griem, Rowena (2011). "Hardegger, Margarethe (1882–1963)". In Ness, Immanuel (ed.). The International Encyclopedia of Revolution and Protest. p. 1. doi:10.1002/9781405198073.wbierp1779. ISBN 9781405198073.
- Hanke, Edith (1999). "Max Weber, Leo Tolstoy and the Mountain of Truth". In Whimster, Sam (ed.). Max Weber and the Culture of Anarchy. Palgrave Macmillan. pp. 144–161. doi:10.1007/978-1-349-27030-9_7. ISBN 978-1-349-27030-9.
- Horrox, James (2015). "The Artist as Critic: Landauer on Wilde". The Wildean (46): 53–71. ISSN 1357-4949. JSTOR 48571627.
- Kuhn, Gabriel; Wolf, Siegbert (2010). "Introduction". In Kuhn, Gabriel (ed.). Revolution and Other Writings: A Political Reader. PM Press. ISBN 978-1-60486-054-2.
- Praz, Anne-Françoise (2007). "Four Swiss villages, 1860-1930 : putting gender back into historical demography". Gender & History. 19 (2): 242–259. doi:10.1111/j.1468-0424.2007.00474.x. ISSN 1468-0424.
- Ruoss, Matthias (2025). "Judging voluntariness: abortion assistance around 1900". Rethinking History. 29 (1): 71–88. doi:10.1080/13642529.2024.2398343. ISSN 1364-2529.
- Whimster, Sam, ed. (1999). "Introduction to Weber, Ascona and Anarchism". Max Weber and the Culture of Anarchy. Palgrave Macmillan. pp. 1–40. doi:10.1007/978-1-349-27030-9_1. ISBN 978-1-349-27030-9.
- Vaucher, Fanny (17 March 2021). "Margarethe Faas-Hardegger". Rosa Luxemburg Foundation.
