= KKN =

KKN may refer to:

- Kantonsschule Küsnacht, a secondary school in Switzerland
- Kirkenes Airport, Høybuktmoen (IATA airport code)
- Kirknewton railway station
- Kyōran Kazoku Nikki, a Japanese light novel, manga, and 2008 anime series
- Niederaichbach Nuclear Power Plant, a decommissioned HWGC reactor in Bavaria
- Kanda, Kodža i Nebojša, a Serbian rock/reggae band
- "korupsi, kolusi, nepotisme" (corruption, collusion and nepotism) in New Order (Indonesia) governance vernacular
