= 1919 Swiss federal election =

- 26 October 1919
- National Council
- All 189 seats in the National Council
Party	Leader	Vote %	Seats	+/–
Free Democrats	Robert Schöpfer	28.85	60	−43
Social Democrats	Gustav Müller	23.46	41	+21
Christian Democrats	Joseph Räber	20.97	41	−1
Farmers, Traders and Independents	Rudolf Minger	15.33	30	+26
Liberals		3.81	9	−3
Grütli Union		2.75	2	New
Democratic		1.96	4	−3
Evangelical People's		0.81	1	+1
Young Radicals			1	+1
This lists parties that won seats. See the complete results below.
- Council of States
- All 44 seats in the Council of States
Party	Seats
Free Democrats	23
Christian Democrats	17
Liberals	2
Democratic	1
Farmers, Traders and Independents	1
This lists parties that won seats. See the complete results below.

Federal elections were held in Switzerland on 26 October 1919. The Free Democratic Party emerged as the largest party in the National Council, winning 60 of the 189 seats.

== Electoral system ==
This was the first election after proportional representation was adopted.

The country was divided into 25 districts - 20 multiple-member districts, with as many as 32 seats, and five were single-member districts. In each, seats were allocated based on parties' vote tallies.

Every multi-member district saw multiple parties take seats. In some districts, no party took more than one seat.

Unlike the previous Plurality block voting system, each voter now had just one vote.

Switzerland used a system of apparentment, allowing parties to combine votes in the same district.

== Results ==
=== National Council ===
Party	Votes	%	Seats	+/–
Free Democratic Party	215,566	28.85	60	–43
Social Democratic Party	175,292	23.46	41	+21
Conservative People's Party	156,702	20.97	41	–1
Party of Farmers, Traders and Independents	114,537	15.33	30	+26
Liberal Democratic Party	28,497	3.81	9	–3
Grütli Union	20,559	2.75	2	New
Democratic Group	14,677	1.96	4	–3
Evangelical People's Party	6,031	0.81	1	+1
Young Radicals	15,342	2.05	1	+1
Others	15,342	2.05	0	–
Total	747,203	100.00	189	0
Valid votes	747,203	98.24		
Invalid/blank votes	13,397	1.76		
Total votes	760,600	100.00		
Registered voters/turnout	946,271	80.38		
Source: Nohlen & Stöver

==== By constituency ====
Constituency	Seats	Party	Seats won
Aargau	12	Party of Farmers, Traders and Independents	3
Aargau	12	Conservative People's Party	3
Aargau	12	Free Democratic Party	3
Aargau	12	Social Democratic Party	3
Appenzell Ausserrhoden	3	Free Democratic Party	2
Appenzell Ausserrhoden	3	Social Democratic Party	1
Appenzell Innerrhoden	1	Conservative People's Party	1
Basel-Landschaft	4	Free Democratic Party	3
Basel-Landschaft	4	Social Democratic Party	1
Basel-Stadt	7	Social Democratic Party	3
Basel-Stadt	7	Conservative People's Party	1
Basel-Stadt	7	Free Democratic Party	1
Basel-Stadt	7	Liberal Party	1
Basel-Stadt	7	Party of Farmers, Traders and Independents	1
Bern	32	Party of Farmers, Traders and Independents	16
Bern	32	Social Democratic Party	9
Bern	32	Free Democratic Party	5
Bern	32	Conservative People's Party	1
Bern	32	Grütli Union	1
Fribourg	7	Conservative People's Party	6
Fribourg	7	Free Democratic Party	1
Geneva	8	Free Democratic Party	2
Geneva	8	Liberal Party	2
Geneva	8	Social Democratic Party	2
Geneva	8	Conservative People's Party	1
Geneva	8	Young Radicals	1
Glarus	2	Democratic Group	1
Glarus	2	Free Democratic Party	1
Grisons	6	Free Democratic Party	3
Grisons	6	Conservative People's Party	2
Grisons	6	Social Democratic Party	1
Lucerne	8	Conservative People's Party	5
Lucerne	8	Free Democratic Party	3
Neuchâtel	7	Social Democratic Party	3
Neuchâtel	7	Free Democratic Party	2
Neuchâtel	7	Liberal Party	2
Nidwalden	1	Conservative People's Party	1
Obwalden	1	Conservative People's Party	1
Schaffhausen	2	Party of Farmers, Traders and Independents	2
Schwyz	3	Conservative People's Party	2
Schwyz	3	Free Democratic Party	1
Solothurn	6	Free Democratic Party	3
Solothurn	6	Social Democratic Party	2
Solothurn	6	Conservative People's Party	1
St. Gallen	15	Conservative People's Party	6
St. Gallen	15	Free Democratic Party	5
St. Gallen	15	Democratic Group	2
St. Gallen	15	Social Democratic Party	2
Ticino	8	Free Democratic Party	4
Ticino	8	Conservative People's Party	3
Ticino	8	Social Democratic Party	1
Thurgau	7	Free Democratic Party	2
Thurgau	7	Party of Farmers, Traders and Independents	2
Thurgau	7	Conservative People's Party	1
Thurgau	7	Democratic Group	1
Thurgau	7	Social Democratic Party	1
Uri	1	Free Democratic Party	1
Vaud	16	Free Democratic Party	9
Vaud	16	Liberal Party	4
Vaud	16	Social Democratic Party	3
Valais	6	Conservative People's Party	5
Valais	6	Free Democratic Party	1
Zug	1	Free Democratic Party	1
Zürich	25	Social Democratic Party	9
Zürich	25	Free Democratic Party	7
Zürich	25	Party of Farmers, Traders and Independents	6
Zürich	25	Conservative People's Party	1
Zürich	25	Evangelical People's Party	1
Zürich	25	Grütli Union	1
Source: Bundesamt für Statistik

=== Council of States ===
In several cantons, the members of the Council of States were chosen by the cantonal parliaments.

Party	Seats
Free Democratic Party	23
Swiss Conservative People's Party	17
Liberal Democratic Party	2
Democratic Group	1
Party of Farmers, Traders and Independents	1
Social Democratic Party	0
Other parties	0
Total	44
Source: Nohlen & Stöver

==== By canton ====
Constituency	Seats	Party	Elected members
Aargau	2	Free Democratic Party	Gottfried Keller
Aargau	2	Free Democratic Party	Peter Emil Isler
Appenzell Ausserrhoden	1	Free Democratic Party	Johannes Baumann
Appenzell Innerrhoden	1	Conservative People's Party	Johann Baptist Edmund Dähler
Basel-Landschaft	1	Free Democratic Party	Gustav Johann Schneider
Basel-Stadt	1	Free Democratic Party	Victor Emil Scherer
Bern	2	Free Democratic Party	Paul Charmillot
Bern	2	Party of Farmers, Traders and Independents	Carl Moser
Fribourg	2	Conservative People's Party	Georges Python
Fribourg	2	Conservative People's Party	Georges de Montenach
Geneva	2	Free Democratic Party	Henri Fazy
Geneva	2	Liberal Party	Jacques Rutty
Glarus	2	Democratic Group	David Legler
Glarus	2	Free Democratic Party	Philippe Mercier
Grisons	2	Free Democratic Party	Andreas Laelys
Grisons	2	Conservative People's Party	Friedrich Brügger
Lucerne	2	Conservative People's Party	Josef Dürig
Lucerne	2	Conservative People's Party	Josef Winiger
Neuchâtel	2	Free Democratic Party	Auguste Pettavel
Neuchâtel	2	Liberal Party	Pierre de Meuron
Nidwalden	1	Conservative People's Party	Jakob Konstantin Wyrsch
Obwalden	1	Conservative People's Party	Adalbert Wirz
Schaffhausen	2	Free Democratic Party	Albert Ammann
Schaffhausen	2	Free Democratic Party	Heinrich Bolli
Schwyz	2	Conservative People's Party	Martin Ochsner
Schwyz	2	Conservative People's Party	Josef Räber
Solothurn	2	Free Democratic Party	Casimir von Arx
Solothurn	2	Free Democratic Party	Robert Schöpfer
St. Gallen	2	Free Democratic Party	Johannes Geel
St. Gallen	2	Conservative People's Party	Anton August Messmer
Ticino	2	Free Democratic Party	Stefano Gabuzzi
Ticino	2	Free Democratic Party	Adolfo Soldini
Thurgau	2	Free Democratic Party	Alexander Otto Aepli
Thurgau	2	Free Democratic Party	Albert Böhi
Uri	2	Conservative People's Party	Karl Huber
Uri	2	Conservative People's Party	Franz Muheim
Vaud	2	Free Democratic Party	Émile Dind
Vaud	2	Free Democratic Party	Henri Simon
Valais	2	Conservative People's Party	Joseph Ribordy
Valais	2	Conservative People's Party	Julius Zen Ruffinen
Zug	2	Conservative People's Party	Josef Andermatt
Zug	2	Conservative People's Party	Josef Hildebrand
Zürich	2	Free Democratic Party	Oskar Wettstein
Zürich	2	Free Democratic Party	Paul Usteri
