= Socialist League (Germany) =

The Socialist League (German: Sozialistischer Bund) was initiated as a political movement by Gustav Landauer in May 1908 and aimed at "uniting all humans who are serious about realizing socialism." Its original strategy was to achieve socialism through the formation of worker cooperatives and intentional communities. Martin Buber, Erich Mühsam, and Margarethe Faas-Hardegger were early members of Landauer's group, which eventually grew to include about 800 members. During the fall of the Bavarian Soviet Republic in the spring of 1919, Landauer was killed, and the movement was thrown into disarray.

It reappeared later as a splinter group of the Independent Social Democratic Party of Germany led by Georg Ledebour. The party got 26,418 votes in the May 1924 Reichstag election.

In the 1928 elections, the party called on its sympathizers to vote for the Communist Party of Germany.

The Socialist League was one of the groups that merged into the Socialist Workers' Party of Germany (SAPD) in 1931.
