= Tagwacht =

Swiss social democratic newspapers

Tagwacht was the name of several social democratic newspapers in Switzerland. They include Die Tagwacht in Zurich (1869–1880), which the Swiss Workers' Federation took over in 1873, and the Berner Tagwacht (1892–1997), which its editor Robert Grimm made into a leading militant paper of the working class from 1909 to 1918.

== Die Tagwacht (Zurich) ==
Die Tagwacht was published in Zurich from 1869 as the organ of the Social Democrats and the trade unions, with Herman Greulich as editor, and from April 1870 as a weekly. In 1873 the Swiss Workers' Federation (Schweizerischer Arbeiterbund) took over Die Tagwacht and published it twice a week. The paper reached its peak in the mid-1870s, with a circulation of about 2,000 copies. The economic crisis and the dissolution of the Workers' Federation led to its closure in 1880.

== Berner Tagwacht ==
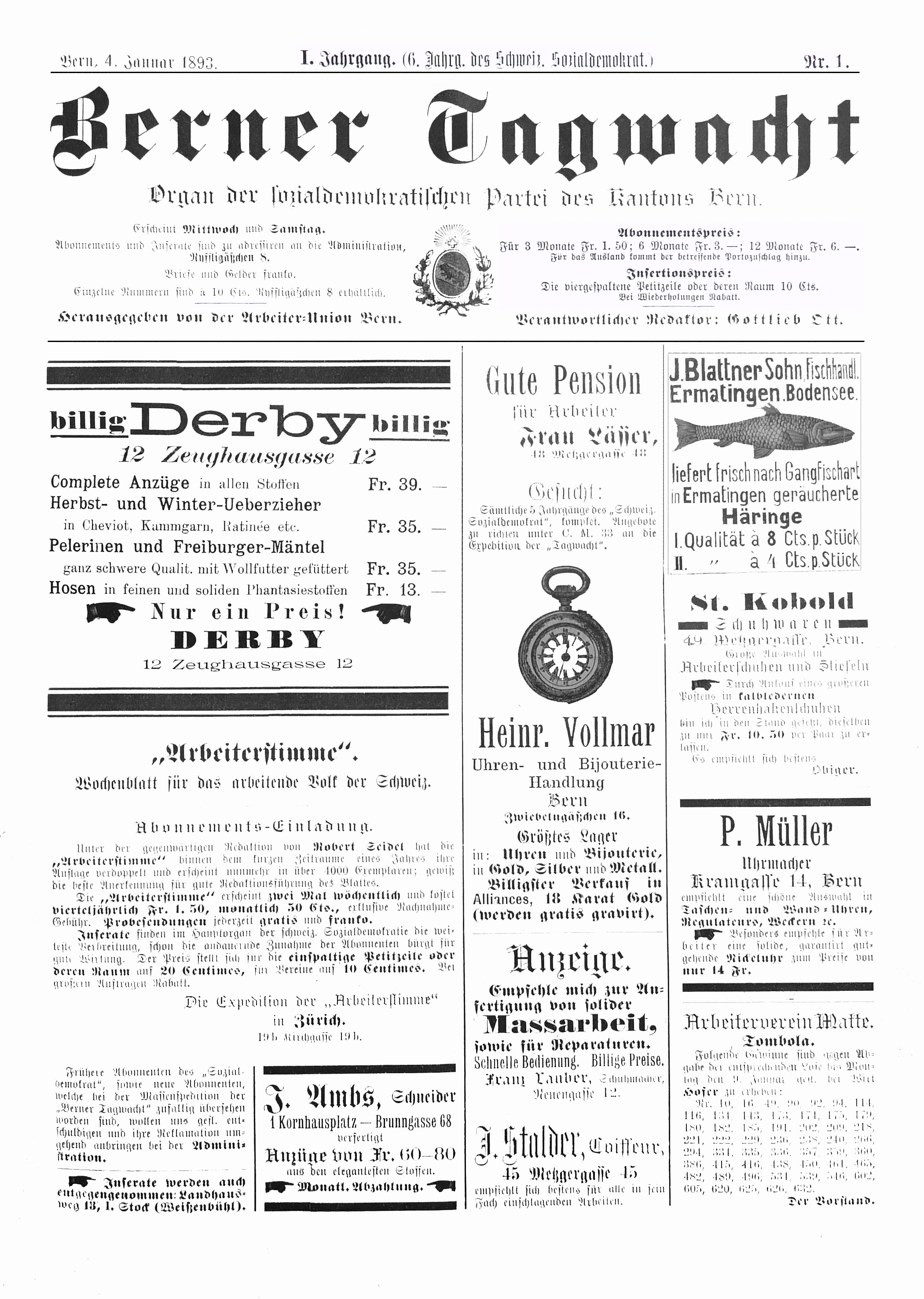
Front page of the Berner Tagwacht of 4 January 1893

The Berner Tagwacht was founded in 1892 as the organ of the cantonal Social Democratic Party (SP) and appeared as a daily from 1906. From 1909 to 1918 its editor Robert Grimm made it into a leading militant paper (Kampfblatt) of the working class, which also attracted international attention during the First World War. Its circulation was 2,300 copies in 1894 and rose to about 20,000 in the 1930s.

In the 1970s the Berner Tagwacht concluded cooperation agreements with social democratic daily newspapers in other cantons, among them the Basler Arbeiter-Zeitung (until 1984) and the Freier Aargauer (until 1987). At the end of the 1980s it appealed for solidarity to SP members and trade unionists in order to secure its survival. Nevertheless, it was closed in 1997 because of financial problems.

== Other newspapers ==
The Seeländer Tagwacht appeared in 1918, the Oltner Tagwacht in 1896–1897 and the Schaffhauser Tagwacht in 1924–1925 and 1929–1933. The illegal Neue Berner Tagwacht of 1943 was the only one with a communist orientation.

== Bibliography ==
- F. Blaser, Bibliographie der Schweizer Presse, 1956–1958, 154, 740, 881, 926, 1001
- E. Gruner, Die Arbeiter in der Schweiz im 19. Jahrhundert, 1968, 760–764
- R. Kohli, 100 Jahre Berner Tagwacht, licentiate thesis, University of Bern, 1992

=== Archives ===
- Swiss Social Archives (Schweizerisches Sozialarchiv): archive of the Berner Tagwacht
