= Ménilmontant FC 1871 =

Amateur football club based in Paris, France

- Full name: Ménilmontant Football Club 1871
- Nicknames: MFC; Ménil FC
- Short name: MFC1871
- Founded: 2014
- Ground: Stade La Motte, Bobigny, Île-de-France
- President: Collective Presidency
- Manager: self-managed by players
- League: Ligue de Paris-Île-de-France de football
- 2025/6: 4th of 12
- Website: MFC 1871 on Facebook
Home colours colors

Ménilmontant Football Club 1871 is an amateur football club based in Paris, France. Founded in 2014 by left-wing political activists, the club operates on a self-managed model and promotes egalitarian values, including anti-racism, anti-sexism, and anti-homophobia. It participates in the lower divisions of the French football league system, combining sport with political and social engagement. The club has no official coach, and decisions are made collectively by players and supporters.

== History ==
Ménilmontant Football Club 1871 was founded in the summer of 2014 in the Ménilmontant area of Paris by a group of friends seeking to create an amateur football club combining sporting activity with explicit social and political values. The founders established the club to combine football with political engagement, focusing on anti-racism, anti-sexism, and anti-homophobia. They sought an alternative to traditional left-wing activism, which they viewed as increasingly formal and ineffective. The club’s activities, including matches and organised events, are designed to encourage social interaction and discussion while promoting its egalitarian values. The club drew inspiration from left-wing influenced teams such as FC St. Pauli, SC Corinthians Paulista and CS Lebowski. The club entered competition within the French Football Federation system in the Seine-Saint-Denis district. From its formation, the club adopted a self-managed structure, with decisions taken collectively by members, and selected the reference "1871" in its name and symbols in reference to the Paris Commune. The club began competing in the fourteenth division during the 2014-2015 season, in line with regulations for newly created teams.

During its first seasons between 2014 and 2016, the club operated without a designated coach, with team selection and organisational decisions made through votes among players. Financing was based on member contributions, generally set at around ten euros per month on a voluntary basis, and on merchandise sales, while the club did not apply for public subsidies. By 2016, the club had approximately twenty to thirty registered players, a regular group of around fifty matchgoing supporters, and a wider network of sympathisers. Home matches were played at venues in the Seine-Saint-Denis area, including Bobigny, rather than in the Ménilmontant neighbourhood itself.

From 2015 onwards, the club became known for organised supporter activity at matches, including chants, banners, and visual displays. The club and its supporters displayed messages addressing issues such as opposition to racism, homophobia, and fascism, support for refugees and undocumented migrants, Palestine, and criticism of police violence. In 2015 and 2016, the club publicly supported a player without legal residency who was facing deportation, including legal and public campaigning, although the player was subsequently deported. The club also organised or participated in matches and events commemorating figures such as Clément Méric and Adama Traoré.

In 2016, the club appointed its first coach while maintaining collective decision-making processes. By the 2016 to 2017 season, Ménilmontant FC 1871 had been promoted to the thirteenth division of the district leagues. During this period, the club established informal contacts with similar amateur clubs and supporter groups in France and other European countries, without entering into formal partnerships. References to the club appeared in cultural works during this period, including music and video projects by artists associated with the Parisian hip-hop scene.

By 2018, Ménilmontant FC 1871 was competing in the lower divisions of the Seine-Saint-Denis district leagues, with an annual budget of approximately €4,000 funded through member contributions, merchandise sales, and event income. The club continued to operate without a permanent stadium in Ménilmontant and played matches at various grounds in the northern Paris suburbs. Media coverage during this period documented the club’s combination of participation in official competitions with ongoing social and political activities, as well as its organisational model based on self-management and member participation.

Also in 2018, the club encouraged its supporters to join the Yellow vests protests.

In December 2019, Ménilmontant FC 1871 faced disciplinary action from the district of Seine-Saint-Denis for the use of smoke and a tifo displayed during a November match. The tifo depicted a police car surrounded by flames with a caption quoting rapper Hugo TSR, which led to the club being suspended from its home stadium for a year, required to play home games at neutral venues more than 20 kilometres away from Bobigny, and fined €800. The incident drew attention on social media, was reported by the SGP-Police union, and triggered a preliminary investigation by the Paris prosecutor’s office. The club appealed the decision, arguing that the disciplinary commission had overstepped its legal competence, but the suspension remained in effect, forcing MFC to host its remaining home games at alternative stadiums.

== Club identity ==
=== Logo ===
The logo of Ménilmontant FC 1871 features a pirate ship with two sails, one black and one red, set against stylised waves and accompanied by two cannons. The design incorporates the date "1871", referencing the Paris Commune, and the colours and imagery reflect the club’s antifascist and anti-authoritarian identity.

== Legacy ==
=== Foundation of similar clubs ===
It is one of several far-left clubs founded in the first half of the 21st century, joined later by FC Hardegger and Spartak Lecce.
