= Swiss Women Workers' Union =

Swiss women workers' organization (1890–1917)

- Union suisse des ouvrières Schweizerischer Arbeiterinnenverband; Federazione svizzera delle lavoratrici
- Formation: 1890
- Dissolved: 1917
- Type: Trade union, Women's rights organization
- Purpose: Workers' rights, women's suffrage, social insurance reform
- Headquarters: Switzerland
- Members: 2,250 (1917)
- President: Verena Conzett (first president)
- Key people: Gertrud Guillaume-Schack, Margarethe Hardegger, Clara Zetkin
- Affiliations: Swiss Trade Union Confederation (1904–1908); Social Democratic Party of Switzerland (1912–1917)

The Swiss Women Workers' Union (Note: German: Schweizerischer Arbeiterinnenverband, SAV; French: Union suisse des ouvrières; Italian: Federazione svizzera delle lavoratrici) was a Swiss women's trade union and women's rights organization that operated from 1890 to 1917. It was notable for being the first organization in Switzerland to demand women's suffrage and for organizing the first International Women's Day celebration in the country.

== History ==
=== Early foundations ===
The first women workers' associations in Switzerland were established in 1885 by Gertrud Guillaume-Schack, an activist of the Second International. These early associations formed the foundation for what would become a nationwide organization.

In 1890, five local women workers' associations from Basel, Bern, St. Gallen, Winterthur, and Zurich united to form the Swiss Women Workers' Union. Under its first president, Verena Conzett, the organization established its primary demands: improvements to social insurance (particularly maternity benefits and worker protection), and notably, women's suffrage – making it the first organization in Switzerland to advocate for women's voting rights as early as 1893.

The union's membership was predominantly recruited from outside traditional trade unions, including domestic workers, home-based workers, housewives, and teachers. This broad recruitment strategy allowed the organization to represent women workers who were often excluded from male-dominated labor organizations.

=== Integration and political development ===
Between 1904 and 1908, the Swiss Women Workers' Union was integrated into the Swiss Trade Union Confederation (USS). During this period, the organization gained significant political profile under the leadership of Margarethe Hardegger, who served as union secretary from 1905 to 1909. Hardegger established two influential publications: Die Vorkämpferin (The Pioneer) and L'Exploitée (The Exploited Woman), which helped spread the union's message and coordinate activities.

Under the influence of Clara Zetkin, a German national and prominent socialist feminist, the Swiss Women Workers' Union refused to join the Alliance of Swiss Women's Societies (BSF/ASF) founded in 1900. Despite this decision, other women workers' associations remained represented within the BSF until 1912. Instead, the Swiss Women Workers' Union sought to collaborate with proletarian women's organizations through international women's conferences.

The organization achieved historical significance by organizing the first International Women's Day celebration on March 8, 1911. This event marked an important milestone in the international women's rights movement and demonstrated the union's commitment to international solidarity among women workers.

=== Final years and dissolution ===
In 1912, the Swiss Women Workers' Union officially joined the Social Democratic Party of Switzerland (SP), aligning itself more closely with the broader socialist movement. However, this integration was short-lived. In 1917, the organization was dissolved along with its 45 local sections, which at the time of dissolution represented approximately 2,250 members.

== Publications ==
The union published two significant periodicals that served to advance its political and social agenda:

- Die Vorkämpferin (1906–1920) – A German-language publication that continued beyond the union's dissolution
- L'Exploitée (1907–1908) – A French-language publication focused on women workers' issues

== Bibliography ==
- Frei, Annette. Rote Patriarchen. Arbeiterbewegung und Frauenemanzipation in der Schweiz um 1900. 1987.
- Mesmer, Beatrix. Ausgeklammert – Eingeklammert. Frauen und Frauenorganisationen in der Schweiz des 19. Jahrhunderts. 1988.
- Holenstein, Katrin; Ryter, Elisabeth. Rote Fahnen – lila Tücher. 8. März: Zur Geschichte des Internationalen Frauentages in der Schweiz. 1993.
- Boesch, Ina. Gegenleben. Die Sozialistin Margarethe Hardegger und ihre politischen Bühnen. 2003.
- Bochsler, Regula. Ich folgte meinem Stern. Das kämpferische Leben der Margarethe Hardegger. 2004.
- Isler, Simona. Politiken der Arbeit. Perspektiven der Frauenbewegung um 1900. 2019.
- Joris, Elisabeth; Witzig, Heidi. Frauengeschichten(n). Dokumente aus zwei Jahrhunderten zur Situation der Frauen in der Schweiz. 2021^{5} (1986), pp. 452–456.
