= Hedwig Lachmann =

German author, translator and poet (1865-1918)

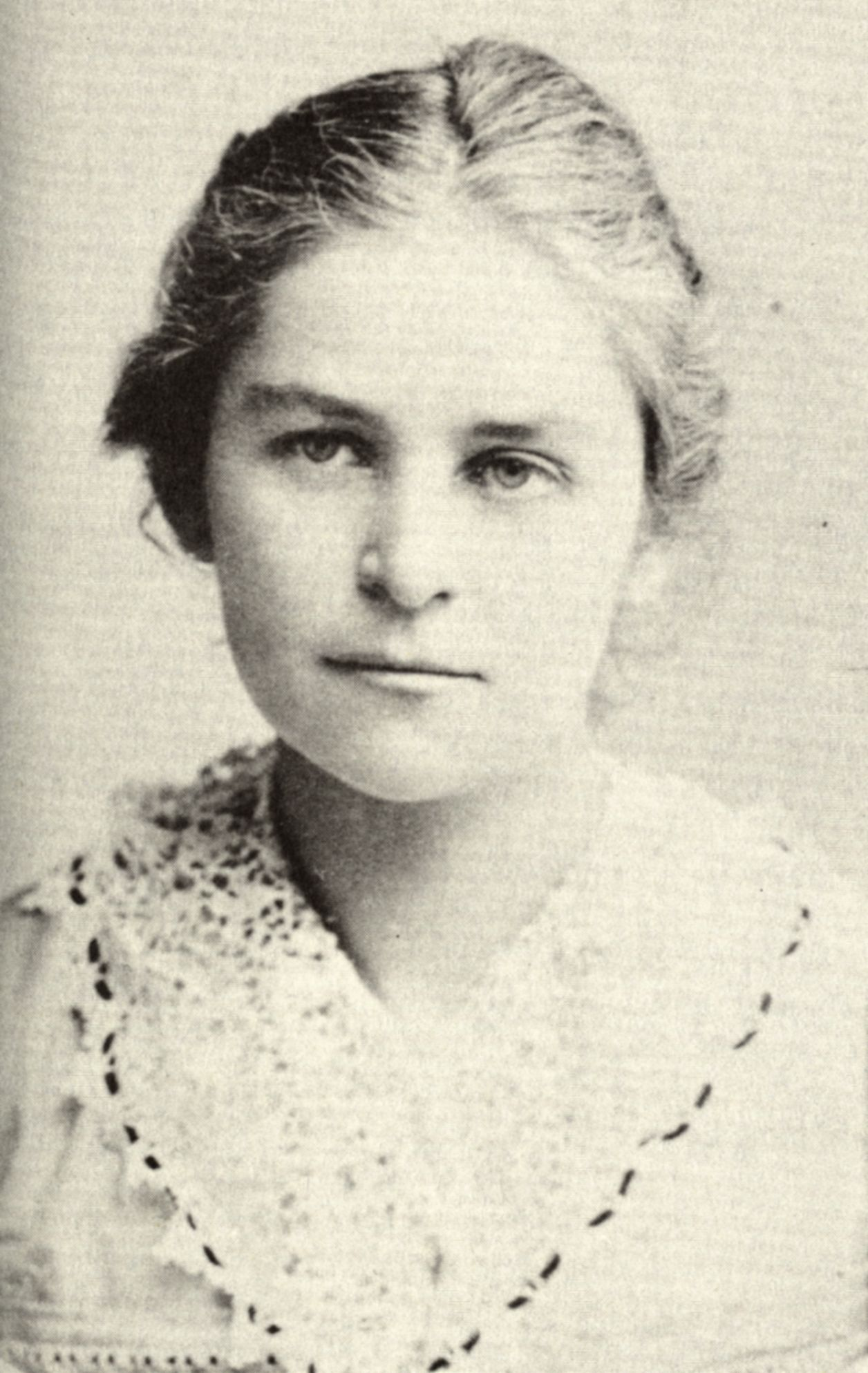
- Born: 29 August 1865; Stolp, Province of Pomerania, Kingdom of Prussia
- Died: 21 February 1918 (aged 52); Krumbach, Kingdom of Bavaria, German Empire

Hedwig Lachmann (German: [ˈlaxman]; 29 August 1865 – 21 February 1918) was a German author, translator and poet.

== Life and work ==
Lachmann was born in Stolp, Pomerania, in 1865, to a Jewish family, and was the daughter of a cantor, Isaak Lachmann. She spent her childhood in Stolp and a subsequent seven years in Hürben (Swabia). At the age of 15, she passed exams in Augsburg to become a language teacher. Two years later she became a governess in England.

From 1899 until 1917 she belonged to both the Friedrichshagen and Pankow poetry societies.

She met her future husband, Gustav Landauer, in 1899 at Richard Dehmel's house. One of their grandchildren, Mike Nichols, grew up to be an American television, stage and film director, writer, and producer. She died in Krumbach, Swabia, a very early fatality of the 1918 flu pandemic.

== Works ==
Poetry

Im Bilde 1902
Gesammelte Gedichte 1919 (posthumous)

Translations
(From English)

Works from Edgar Allan Poe
Works from Rabindranath Tagore: The Post Office, The King of the Dark Chamber

(From Hungarian)

Hungarian Poems 1891
Works from Sándor Petőfi

(From French)

Oscar Wilde: Salome. This became the libretto for Richard Strauss's opera Salome.
Works from Honoré de Balzac
