= FC Hardegger =

- Full name: Hardegger Football Club
- Nickname: Hardegger
- Founded: 2022
- Chairman: Self-managed by players
- Coach: Rotating coaches
- League: Ligue Romande de Football (Group D)
- 2025/6: 10th of 12
- Website: Hardegger Football Club on Instagram
Home colours

The Hardegger Football Club, or FC Hardegger, is an anti-fascist and anarchist football club based in Lausanne, Switzerland. Founded in 2022 in tribute to the Swiss anarchist Margarethe Hardegger, it is self-managed, features rotating coaches, has a mixed-gender team, and sports black and purple colors.

From its inception, the club has been involved in organizing anti-fascist and anti-imperialist events, such as those in support of Palestine. This included a tournament organized twenty days after the start of the Israel-Hamas war and the Gaza genocide, which was scheduled to take place on the grounds of the University of Lausanne before the university banned it. In the following years, the club continued its participation in tournaments and the organization of events dedicated to social causes and solidarity.

== History ==
=== Foundation, choice of name, and structure ===
The club was founded in 2022 and named after Hardegger, a Swiss anarchist who was active in the early 20th century. Initially started by a group of friends, the club describes itself as 'anti-fascist, solidary, and self-managed'.

FC Hardegger is self-managed and self-funded by its participants, with efforts made to allow marginalized individuals to participate in the sport with as few barriers to entry as possible. Furthermore, the club's team is mixed-gender, and membership fees are based on a pay-what-you-can system. Their colors are black and purple, and the jerseys feature anti-fascist slogans in Persian and Italian. The coaching role is rotational and generally held by members who have a background in amateur, semi-professional, or professional football.

It is one of several far-left clubs founded in the first half of the 21st century, alongside Ménilmontant FC and Spartak Lecce. Several of the club's women players had no prior experience with football and picked up the sport by joining the club.

=== Early years (2022-2026) ===
At the end of October 2023, following the outbreak of the Israel-Hamas war and the Gaza genocide, the club organized a football tournament to raise funds and send them as humanitarian aid to Palestine, entrusting them to the Palestinian Red Crescent and Medical Aid for Palestinians. The tournament, which was initially scheduled to take place at the University of Lausanne, was banned by the university management, which initially stated briefly that the university does not engage in political events related to ongoing conflicts.

However, this ban was criticized in an open letter signed by 235 academics and 9 associations, and the press, including Blick and 20 Minutes, took up the case. This prompted the university to backtrack ten days later, claiming that it was a 'communication error' and that the ban was actually based on administrative grounds, as the tournament had been organized too quickly. The club responded by pointing out a double standard, arguing that similar events in support of Ukraine following the Russian invasion had not faced any issues. The eco-friendly and participatory newspaper Le Canard Huppé suggested that the legality of the university's decisions should be examined under Swiss law.

The following year, on 23 June, 5 July, and 14 July, as part of Euro 2024, which the club criticized for its ties to capitalism, it organized a series of gatherings at the Zinéma in Lausanne, featuring documentary films and discussions on sports fandom and politics, Palestine, and sports boycotts. Meanwhile, on 29 June, the club also participated in an anti-racist tournament held at the grounds of FC Aire Le Lignon in Vernier, which brought together 40 participating teams.

In February 2026, the club joined the Apartheid Free Zone, a group of dozens of Swiss institutions and associations boycotting the Israeli state. On 6 June 2026, it organized an anti-imperialist tournament in Lausanne with a pay-what-you-can entry fee, featuring several cultural and activist activities such as DJ sets and silkscreen printing workshops. In the communication accompanying the event, the group reacted to renewed American imperialism under the presidency of Donald Trump.

== Works ==
- FC Hardegger press release regarding the organization of an anti-imperialist football tournament, on La Bibliothèque anarchiste (2026)
