= Hermann Haller (composer) =

Swiss composer (1914–2002)

Hermann Haller (9 June 1914 – 13 August 2002) was a Swiss composer.

== Life ==
Hermann Haller was born in Burgdorf, Switzerland. His uncle was the sculptor Hermann Haller. After his matura in 1933 he studied at the conservatory of Zurich: Volkmar Andreae, Paul Müller-Zürich and Rudolf Wittelsbach were his teachers. In 1938–39 he studied composition in Paris with Nadia Boulanger.

After World War II Haller started to teach piano at the "Lehrerseminar" Küsnacht until 1979.

He wrote many works, including three string quartets, two piano concertos, one symphony for large orchestra and a song cycle for baritone and orchestra, Ed è subito sera (1978), on poems of Salvatore Quasimodo.

== Works (selection) ==
=== Chamber music ===
- Sonate for flute and piano (1945)
- String quartet (1961)
- 6 Inventionen for flute and harpsichord (1966)
- «In memoriam» 5 pieces for piano trio (1968)
- Sonata for piano (1969)
- String quartet #2 (1971)
- 3 Nocturnes for viola and piano (1972)
- Oktett for oboe, clarinet, bassoon, string quartet and piano (1976)
- 5 pièces en forme de variations for wind quintet (1980)
- «Blaue Wand», Impressionen nach einem Bild von Hans Fischli for flute, string sextet and piano (1986)
- String quartet #3 (1992)

=== Orchestral works ===
- Concerto per archi (1961), world premiere by Lucerne Festival Strings, 1962
- Sinfonie (nach Gemälden von Max Gubler) (1965)
- Ballade for horn and string orchestra (1967)
- «Per la Camerata» for 16 strings (1974)
- Variations for orchestra (1975/76)
- «Fünf Aspekte» for orchestra (1985/86)

=== Solo concertos ===
- Konzert for organ and string orchestra Orgel (1957)
- Konzert #1 for piano and orchestra (1959)
- Doppelkonzert for flute, clarinet and string orchestra (1961)
- Konzert #2 for piano and string orchestra (1962)
- Extension – Contraction, musique élégiaque pour violoncelle et orchestre (1980/81)
- «Episoden» for viola and orchestra (1990/91)

=== Vocal works ===
- «Exoratio» for alto and string quartet (or string orchestra) (1956)
- 5 Lieder on poems by Hölderlin for alto solo and orchestra (1961)
- «Hiob», oratorio for soprano and baritone solo, mixed choir, organ and orchestra (1974)
- Psalm 103 for soprano solo, mixed choir and organ (1976)
- «Ed è subito sera», cinque liriche su versi di Salvatore Quasimodo per baritono e orchestra (1978)
- Abschied for soprano solo and string orchestra (on the poem "El viaje definitivo" by Juan Ramón Jiménez (1984)
- Blätterfall… for baritone solo and string sextet, on a poem by Adrien Turel (1994)
