= Trade unions in Switzerland =

- National organization(s): SGB/USS Travail.Suisse
- Total union membership: 675,000 (2017)
- Density: 14.9% (2017)
- CBA coverage: 49.2% (2016)

Global Rights Index
- 2 Repeated violations of rights

International Labour Organization
- Switzerland is a member of the ILO

Convention ratification
- Freedom of Association: 25 March 1975
- Right to Organise: 17 August 1999

Trade unions in Switzerland have their origins in the 19th century when the country began to industrialise. Workers' associations first formed in the 1860s which assumed union functions, mutual insurance activities, sponsored candidates for election and campaigned in referendums. In 1873 a number of the associations in the German-speaking areas formed the Workers' Federation (German: Arbeiterbund), which represented around 5,000 by the late 1870s and campaigned for legislative reform. In 1880, the Workers' Federation dissolved itself into two separate wings; the Swiss Trade Union Federation (SGB/USS) and the Social Democratic Party.

For most of the latter half of the 20th century, trade unions enjoyed relatively stable and secure positions within the country's consensus-oriented industrial relations system. However, following the recession of the early 1990s, trade unions came under increasing pressure from employers and the government which promoted the deregulation of labour markets, less binding collective bargaining and weaker wage growth.

At present, there are two national trade union centres; the Swiss Trade Union Federation (SGB/USS) with approximately 385,000 members and Travail.Suisse with approximately 170,000 members. The former is associated with socialist political currents in Switzerland, the latter somewhat associated with Christian Democratic currents.
