= Gustav Landauer =

German anarchist and revolutionary (1870–1919)

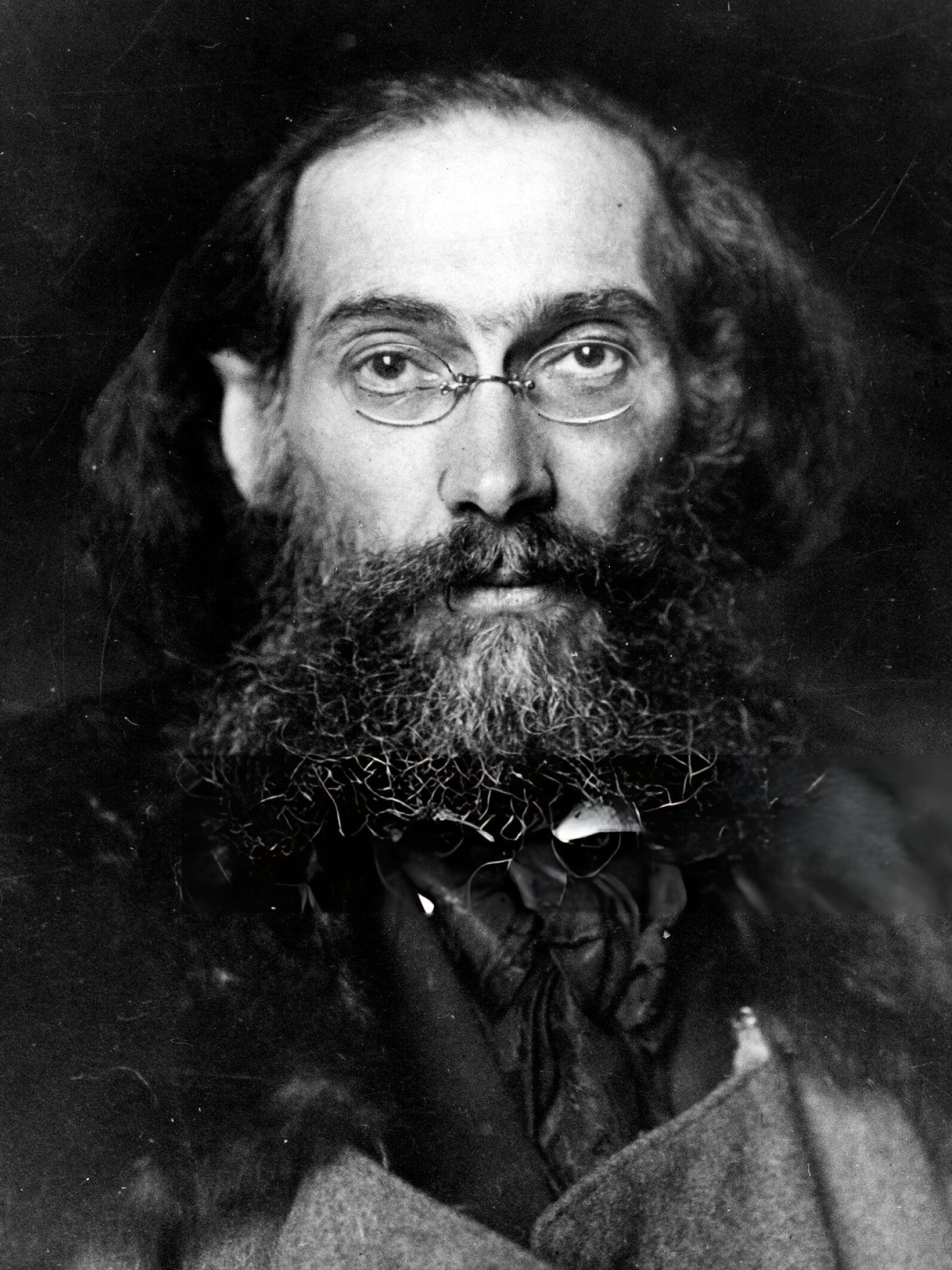
- Landauer in the 1910s
- Born: 7 April 1870; Karlsruhe, Grand Duchy of Baden, German Confederation
- Died: 2 May 1919 (aged 49); Munich, Bavarian Soviet Republic
- Cause of death: Murdered
- Education: Heidelberg University; University of Berlin; University of Strasbourg
- Known for: Leading theorist of anarchism in Germany; Commissioner for Enlightenment and Public Instruction in the Bavarian Soviet Republic (1919)
- Notable work: Skepsis und Mystik (1903); Die Revolution (1907); Aufruf zum Sozialismus (1911)
- Movement: Anarchism; Libertarian socialism; Anarchist nationalism (Note: Gustav Landauer partially supported certain elements of German nationalism—specifically, a non-racist interpretation of völkisch thought.)
- Spouse: Hedwig Lachmann (m. 1903; died 1918)

Gustav Landauer (German: [ˈlandaʊɐ]; 7 April 1870 – 2 May 1919) was a German anarchist writer and revolutionary. As one of the leading theorists of anarchism in Germany at the turn of the 20th century, he advocated a form of libertarian socialism that rejected both capitalism and Marxist historical materialism. Landauer's philosophy synthesized anarchism with romanticism, mysticism, and a non-racist, communitarian interpretation of völkisch thought, emphasizing spiritual renewal and the creation of decentralized, autonomous communities.

Born into a middle-class Jewish family in Karlsruhe, Landauer's early thought was shaped by German Romanticism and the philosophies of Baruch Spinoza, Arthur Schopenhauer, and Friedrich Nietzsche. In Berlin during the 1890s, he became a prominent anarchist voice, breaking with the Social Democratic Party over its rigid Marxism. He argued that socialism was not an inevitable outcome of economic laws but an act of human will and ethical choice. His major works, including Skepsis und Mystik (Skepticism and Mysticism, 1903) and Aufruf zum Sozialismus (Call to Socialism, 1911), articulated his view that the state is not an institution to be violently overthrown but a social relationship that can be replaced by creating new, voluntary forms of community.

From the 1890s until the First World War, Landauer was the central figure behind the newspaper Der Sozialist. In 1908, he founded the Socialist Bund (Socialist League), an association of autonomous groups intended to prefigure a future libertarian society through cooperative settlements. A committed pacifist, Landauer opposed World War I and advocated for a general strike to prevent it. During this time, he developed a cosmopolitan cultural nationalism that defined nations as peaceful communities of spirit, distinct from the violent structures of states.

During the German Revolution of 1918–1919, Landauer was invited to Munich by Kurt Eisner. He participated in the proclamation of the Bavarian Soviet Republic in April 1919 and served in its first, short-lived council of people's deputies as Commissioner for Enlightenment and Public Instruction. When the republic was crushed by government troops, Landauer was arrested and murdered in Stadelheim Prison. His ideas influenced figures such as Martin Buber, Ernst Toller, and the German youth movement, and his work represents a significant communitarian and anti-authoritarian alternative to both capitalism and state socialism.

== Early life and education (1870–1891) ==
Gustav Landauer was born in Karlsruhe, the capital of Baden, on 7 April 1870, into a well-to-do middle-class Jewish family. His parents, Hermann and Rosa (née Neuberger) Landauer, were assimilated Jews who were not religious, and Landauer's contact with the synagogue was slight.

His father, a shoe store owner, intended for him to have a commercial career and sent him to a Realgymnasium. However, Landauer showed an unusual sensitivity to music and literature from an early age and eventually switched to the classically oriented Bismarck Gymnasium. He found the formal classical instruction "boring and stultifying", gaining his "real education" from the theatre, books, and music. At fifteen, he was deeply attached to German romantic music and literature, particularly the works of Richard Wagner. He later explored the philosophies of Baruch Spinoza and Arthur Schopenhauer, whose The World as Will and Representation appealed to his romantic and mystical inclinations. At seventeen, during a school patriotic festival, Landauer delivered a "mildly revolutionary speech" that drew heavily on the then-academically unacceptable poet Heinrich Heine, for which he was publicly reprimanded by the school's director.

Between 1888 and 1891, Landauer studied Germanics, philosophy, and history at the University of Heidelberg, the University of Berlin, and the University of Strasbourg. He became proficient in French and English and developed a deep interest in the writers of the German Romantic period. His studies were also shaped by the works of Henrik Ibsen and Friedrich Nietzsche. Ibsen's dramas, particularly An Enemy of the People and Ghosts, appealed to Landauer for their depiction of the creative individual struggling against a philistine bourgeois society. Nietzsche's philosophy, which Landauer studied intensively, provided a crucial bridge from his earlier passive aestheticism to later activism. Nietzsche's emphasis on life affirmation, the "will to power" (interpreted by Landauer as voluntarism and self-transformation), and the critique of Schopenhauer's pessimism deeply resonated with him.

== Socialist and anarchist beginnings in Berlin (1891–1893) ==
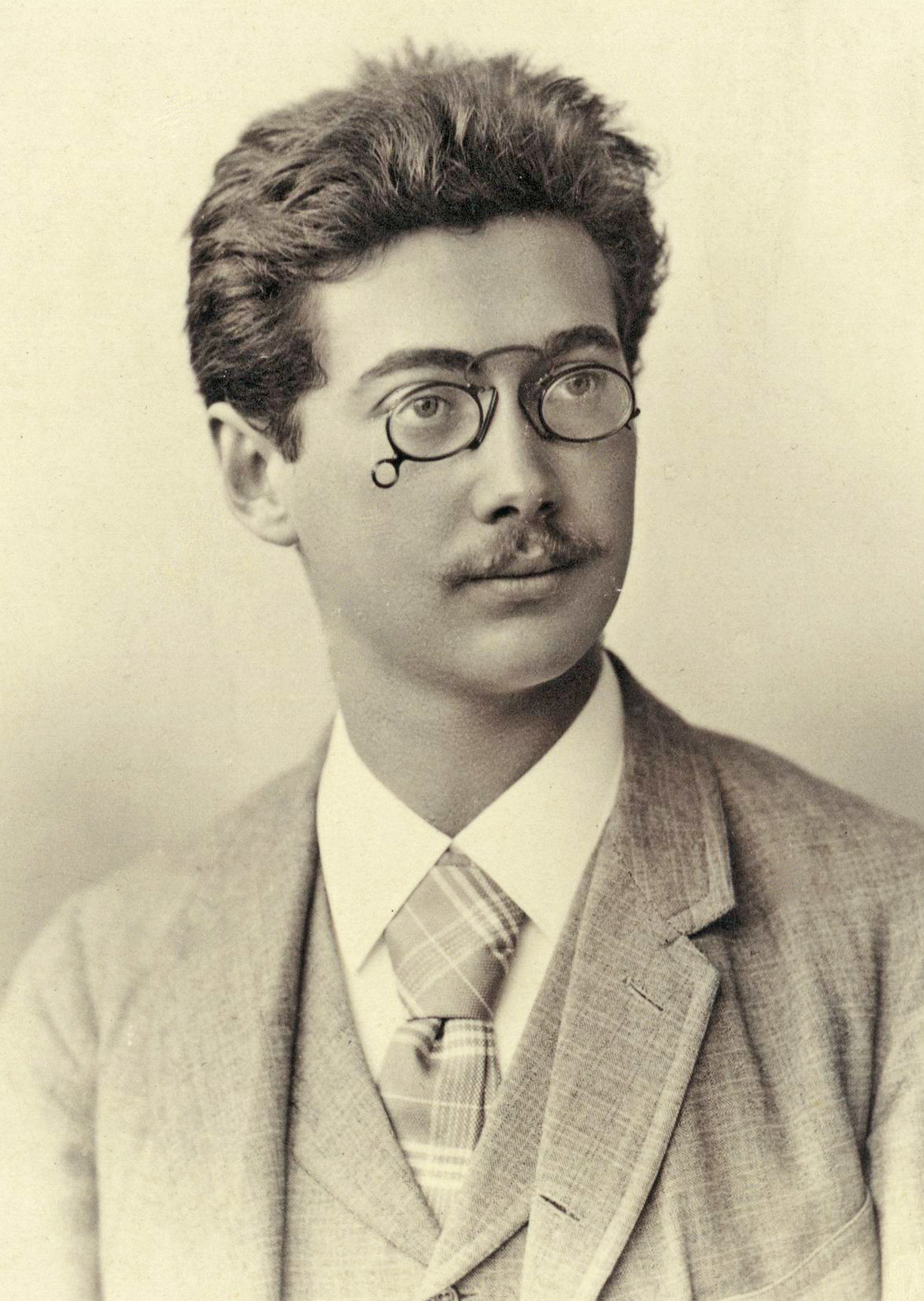
Landauer in 1892

In 1891, Landauer returned to Berlin, intending to continue his studies. The German capital was a center of political and intellectual ferment following the 1890 resignation of Chancellor Otto von Bismarck and the lapse of the Anti-Socialist Laws. The Social Democratic Party (SPD) had adopted a new, more strictly Marxist program at its 1891 Erfurt conference, an act which drove many intellectuals, including Landauer, away from the party. Some, influenced by Nietzsche and Max Stirner, turned towards anarchism. Through the drama critic and novelist Fritz Mauthner, Landauer was introduced to the progressive literary figures of the city and became involved with the Neue Freie Volksbühne, a theatre organization for the working class that had split from the more Marxist Freie Volksbühne.

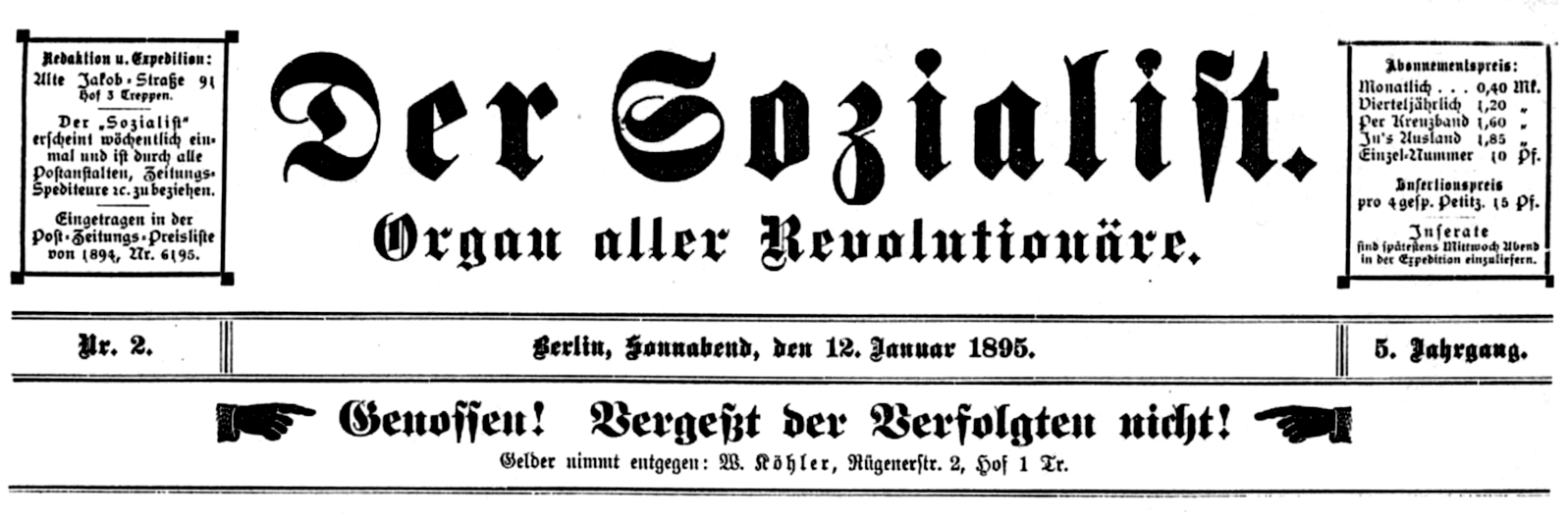
Header of Der Sozialist, 12 January 1895

Landauer's intellectual background and his association with a radical anti-Marxist socialist group led by Benedikt Friedländer made him receptive to revolutionary currents. He began writing articles on social questions, some of which were published in the SPD organ Die Neue Zeit. Soon after February 1892, he joined the staff of Der Sozialist, a newspaper founded by dissident socialists who had been expelled from the SPD. The paper eventually adopted the subtitle "Organ of Anarchism-Socialism" and became the leading voice for anarchism in Germany. In late 1891 or early 1892, Landauer married a seamstress, Grete Leuschner.

During this period, Landauer wrote his first book, Der Todesprediger (The Preacher of Death), published in 1893. The work, which Landauer later described as the product of a twenty-year-old, is a philosophical novel dedicated to the cause of anarchism. It follows a hero who, through a process of overcoming despair rooted in pure rationalism, finds a path back to socialist activism through sensual love and an appreciation for life. The book contains the essential elements of Landauer's mature vision of a better life for mankind. In August 1893, Landauer was selected as an anarchist delegate to the International Workers' Congress in Zurich. After much angry debate, a motion by SPD leader August Bebel excluded all anarchists. Landauer and other German delegates were ejected from the congress by force. At a separate meeting of anarchists, he delivered a fiery speech calling for the general strike to be the "introduction of the revolution".

== Anarcho-socialism, romanticism, and mysticism (1893–1907) ==
In the mid-1890s, Landauer began to frame his anarcho-socialism in terms of romantic and idealist philosophy, shifting away from purely urban, proletarian concerns towards völkisch ideology, handicrafts, and peasant life. This reorientation developed as an alternative to Marxist materialism and industrial urbanism.

=== The appeal of anarchism and early activism ===
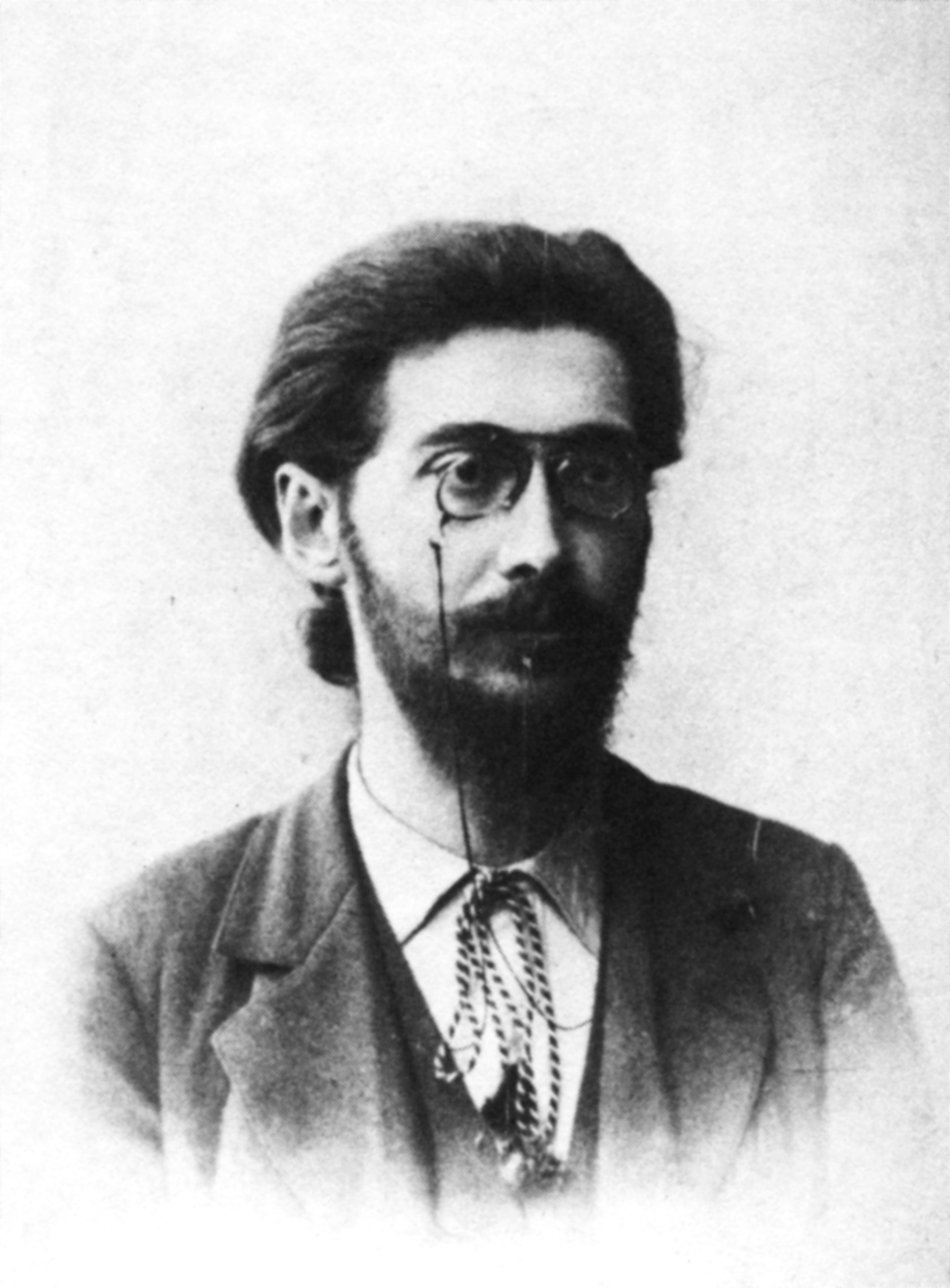
Landauer c. 1890s

Anarchism in Germany was a relatively weak tradition, but Der Sozialist under Landauer became the country's only anarchist newspaper. Its appeal was mainly to intellectuals and artists rebelling against regimentation. Landauer's initial phase of anarchism (1893–1894) focused on anarcho-syndicalism, advocating for workers to build trade unions as models for a future socialist society. In October 1893, he was arrested for an article in Der Sozialist advocating "disobedience of the law" and sentenced to two months in prison. In December, an additional nine months were added for "incitement". While imprisoned, he wrote the novella "Arnold Himmelheber".

After his release, with Der Sozialist temporarily suppressed, Landauer faced financial hardship. The University of Freiburg rejected his application to study medicine due to his prison record. In 1895, he re-established Der Sozialist and published the pamphlet Ein Weg zur Befreiung der Arbeiterklasse (A Way to the Liberation of the Working Class), which outlined his new tactic: establishing producer-consumer cooperatives to build socialism outside the capitalist system. He increasingly clashed with authorities, leading to a notable incident in October 1896 where he and his colleagues exposed a police spy, Commissar Bösel. Landauer was arrested but ultimately acquitted. At the 1896 London International Socialist Congress, from which anarchists were again excluded, Landauer argued for peasant cooperatives to prevent proletarianization, marking a turn toward an anti-industrial, völkisch romanticism.

=== Isolation and mysticism ===
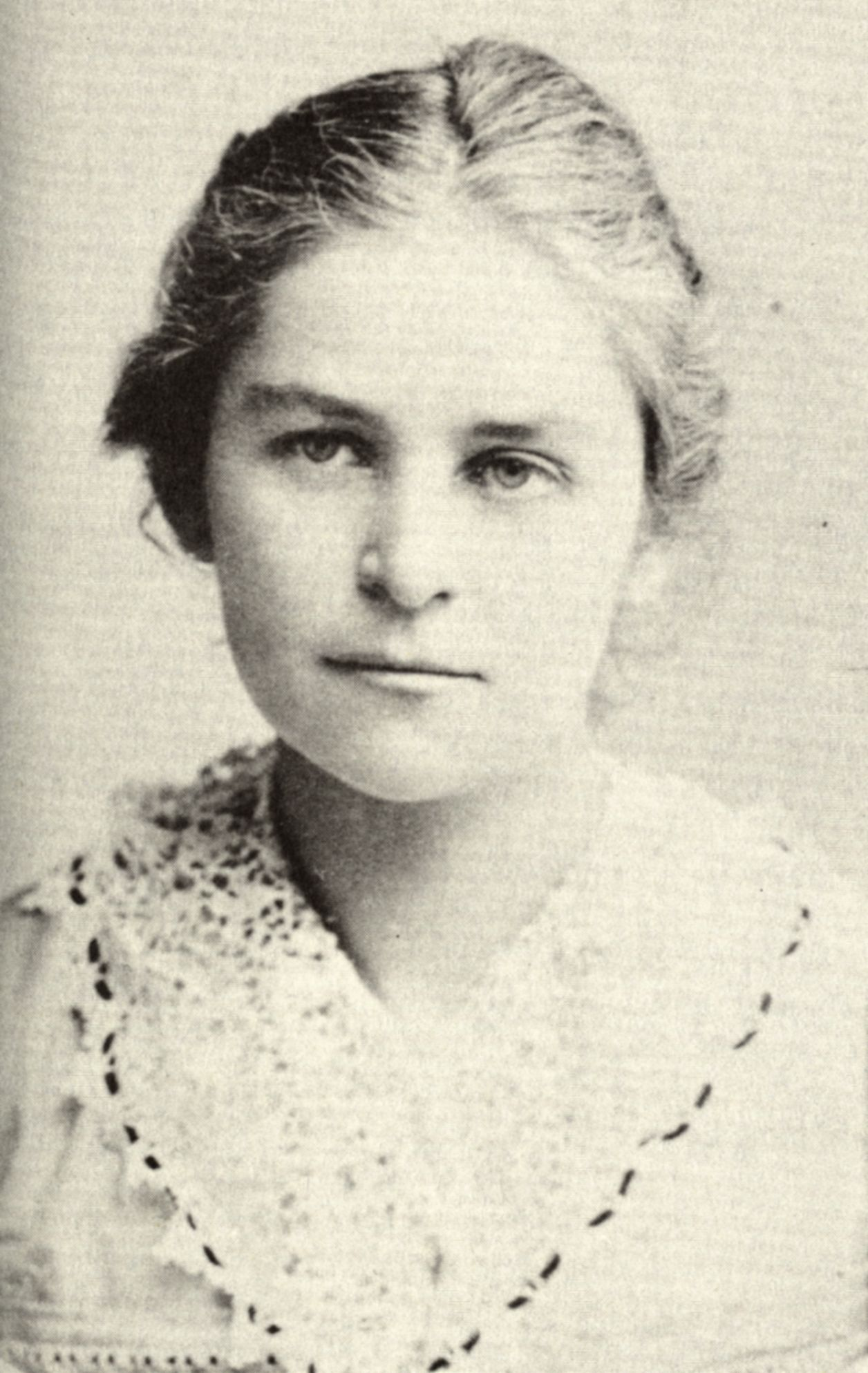
Hedwig Lachmann

In 1897, Landauer separated from his wife Grete and moved to Friedrichshagen, a literary colony. Political isolation followed as Der Sozialist lost readers and ceased publication in 1899. He was imprisoned again for six months in March 1899 for libeling a police commissioner in connection with the Ziethen affair, a case he had taken up with the social reformer Moritz von Egidy. Shortly before his imprisonment, in March 1899, he met the poet Hedwig Lachmann at a meeting of the Neue Gemeinschaft, a literary circle led by Heinrich and Julius Hart. Their relationship deepened through correspondence while he was in prison, and she became his second wife in 1903.

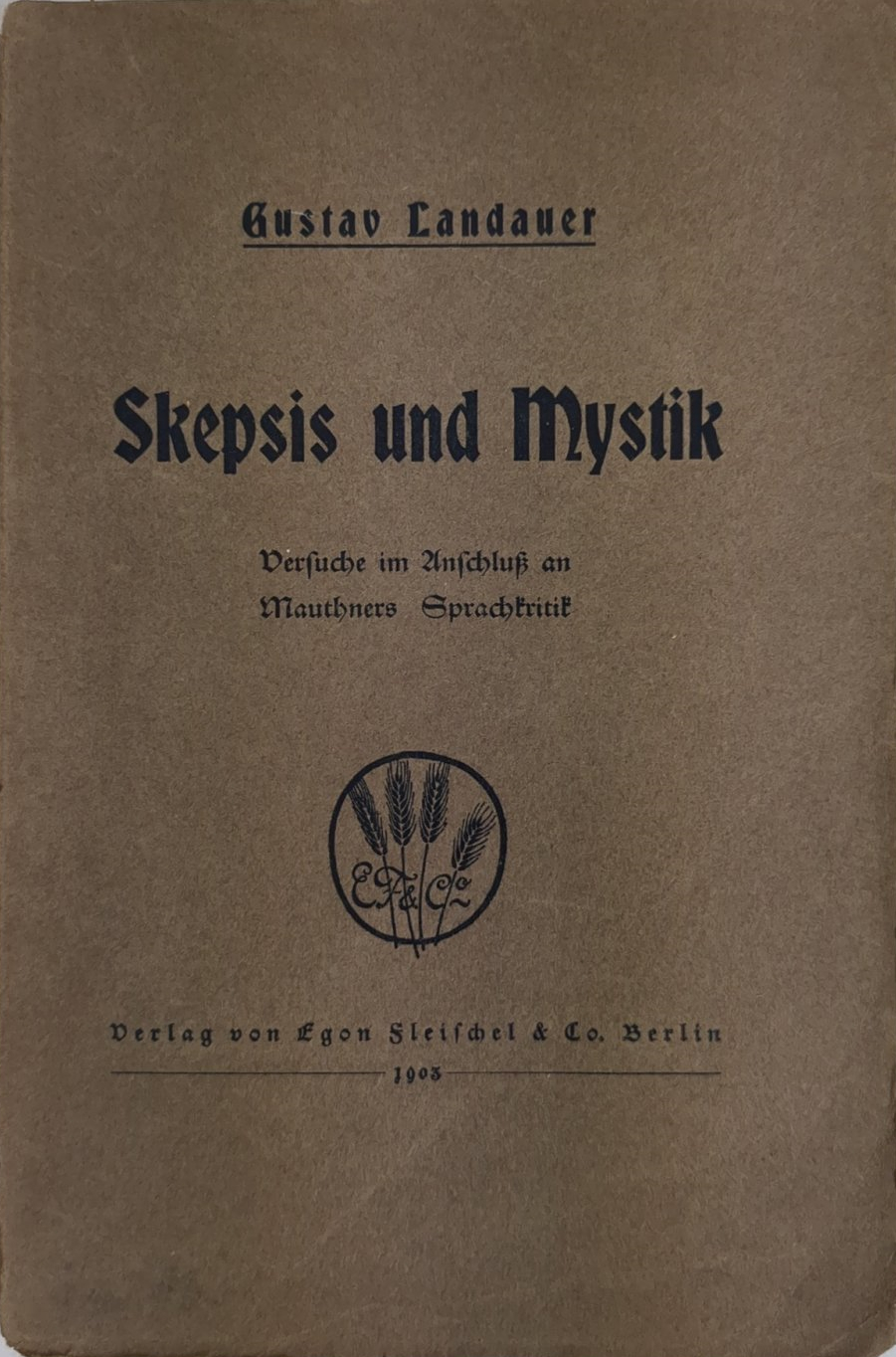
Cover of Skepsis und Mystik (1903)

This period of isolation led Landauer to mysticism. While in prison (1899–1900), he translated the sermons of the medieval German mystic Meister Eckhart and edited the manuscripts for his friend Fritz Mauthner's seminal work on language critique, Beiträge zu einer Kritik der Sprache. These two influences formed the basis for his own major philosophical work, Skepsis und Mystik: Versuche im Anschluss an Mauthners Sprachkritik (Skepticism and Mysticism: Essays in Connection with Mauthner's Language Criticism, 1903).

In Skepsis und Mystik, Landauer utilized Mauthner's critique of language—which argues that language is incapable of perceiving reality—but moved beyond Mauthner's skepticism. Landauer contended that once skepticism has cleared away old illusions, new, self-created "illusions" (mysticism) are necessary for life. He posited that true reality is a "World-I" or universal psyche, a community with the world that is experienced internally. This mystical consciousness of the indwelling universe (Weltall) is an awareness of the individual's rootedness in inherited, developing communities (Volk, humanity).

After his release, Landauer and Lachmann lived in England from September 1901 to June 1902, where they associated with Peter Kropotkin. Financial difficulties and Lachmann's pregnancy led them to return to Germany, settling in Hermsdorf, near Berlin. In 1903, he secured a divorce from his first wife and formally married Lachmann. That same year, a second edition of Der Todesprediger was published, along with a volume containing his two novellas, "Arnold Himmelheber" and "Lebendig tot" (written in prison in 1900), under the title Macht und Mächte (Might and Destinies).

== The romantic as socialist (1907–1918) ==
In the decade before the Bavarian Revolution, Landauer articulated his mature synthesis of romantic and socialist thought, producing his most substantial works.

=== Philosophy of history and the Socialist Bund ===
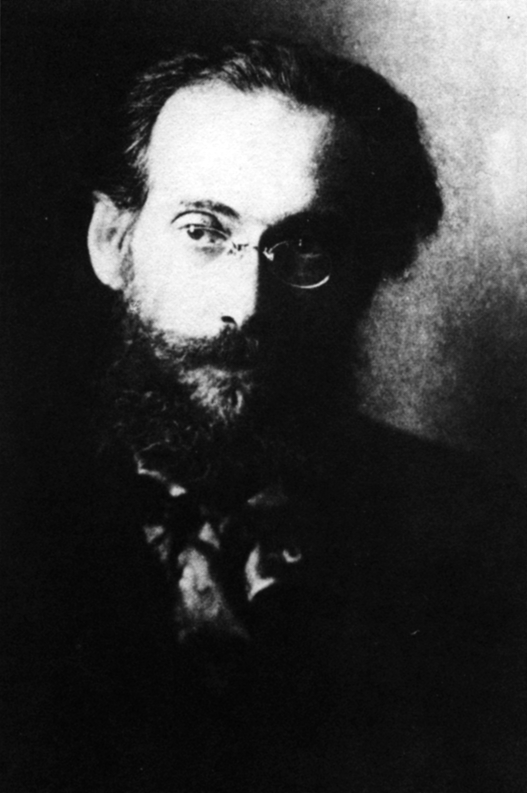
Landauer c. 1900s

Landauer's major historical work, Die Revolution (1907), presented a romantic medievalist view, portraying the Middle Ages as an age of Geist (spirit) and organic community, a "society of societies" destroyed by the modern emphasis on the state beginning around 1500. The spirit of community (Geist), however, survived as a subterranean countercurrent.

In January 1907, Landauer published "Volk und Land: Thirty Socialist Theses", which laid the groundwork for the Socialist Bund (Sozialistischer Bund). The Bund was launched in June 1908 with "Twelve Articles" aiming to begin immediate socialist construction in enclaves outside the capitalist state through a federation of autonomous communities. Der Sozialist was revived in January 1909 as the Bund's organ. The Bund attracted mainly middle-class intellectuals, including Martin Buber and Erich Mühsam, but struggled to gain broader appeal.

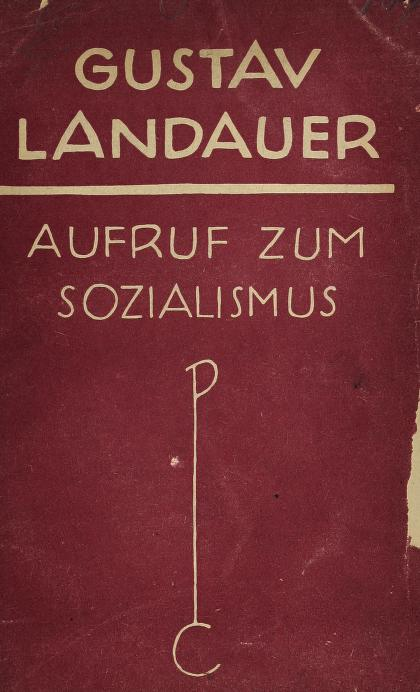
Cover of the 1919 edition of Aufruf zum Sozialismus (1911)

Landauer's major theoretical work of this period, Aufruf zum Sozialismus (Call to Socialism, 1911), further elaborated his critique of Marxism. He rejected historical materialism and "scientific socialism", arguing that socialism arises from human will and ethical necessity, not from objective economic laws. True socialism required a withdrawal from the capitalist system into decentralized, rural, mutual-aid settlements integrating agriculture and craft industries. The state, he reiterated, is not an external force to be overthrown, but a "condition, a certain relationship between human beings"; it is destroyed by "contracting other relationships, by behaving differently".

=== World War I and cultural nationalism ===
The period from 1911 to 1918 saw Landauer's preoccupations shift towards the national question and the threat of war. He developed a humanitarian and pacifist conception of the nation (Volk), drawing on the cosmopolitan cultural nationalism of early German romantics like Johann Gottfried Herder and Johann Gottlieb Fichte. Each Volk, he insisted, is a unique reflection of and contributor to universal humanity, a community of peace distinct from the state, which is a structure of force and violence.

After the Agadir Crisis of 1911, he became a vocal opponent of militarism, prophesying a European war. He advocated for a political general strike to prevent war. His 1911 pamphlet, Die Abschaffung des Kriegs durch die Selbstbestimmung des Volks (The Abolition of War through the Self-Determination of the Volk), which outlined this, was confiscated by Berlin police, leading to a protracted legal battle.

During World War I, Landauer opposed the war on moral grounds. He used Der Sozialist (until its cessation in April 1915) to promote his ideas. He felt increasingly isolated as friends like Fritz Mauthner supported the war effort. Landauer was active in pacifist circles like the Aufbruchkreis (1915–1916) with figures from Expressionism and the youth movement, such as Kurt Hiller and Ernst Joël. His literary lectures during the war (on Johann Wolfgang von Goethe, Friedrich Hölderlin, Georg Kaiser, William Shakespeare) often contained veiled political criticism. In a letter dated Christmas 1916, he urged US President Woodrow Wilson to work for a postwar international congress that would guarantee constitutional rights and disarmament. His cultural nationalism remained cosmopolitan and antiauthoritarian, rejecting racism and anti-Semitism, and affirming his identity as a "German, a south German, and a Jew".

== Revolution in Bavaria and death (1918–1919) ==
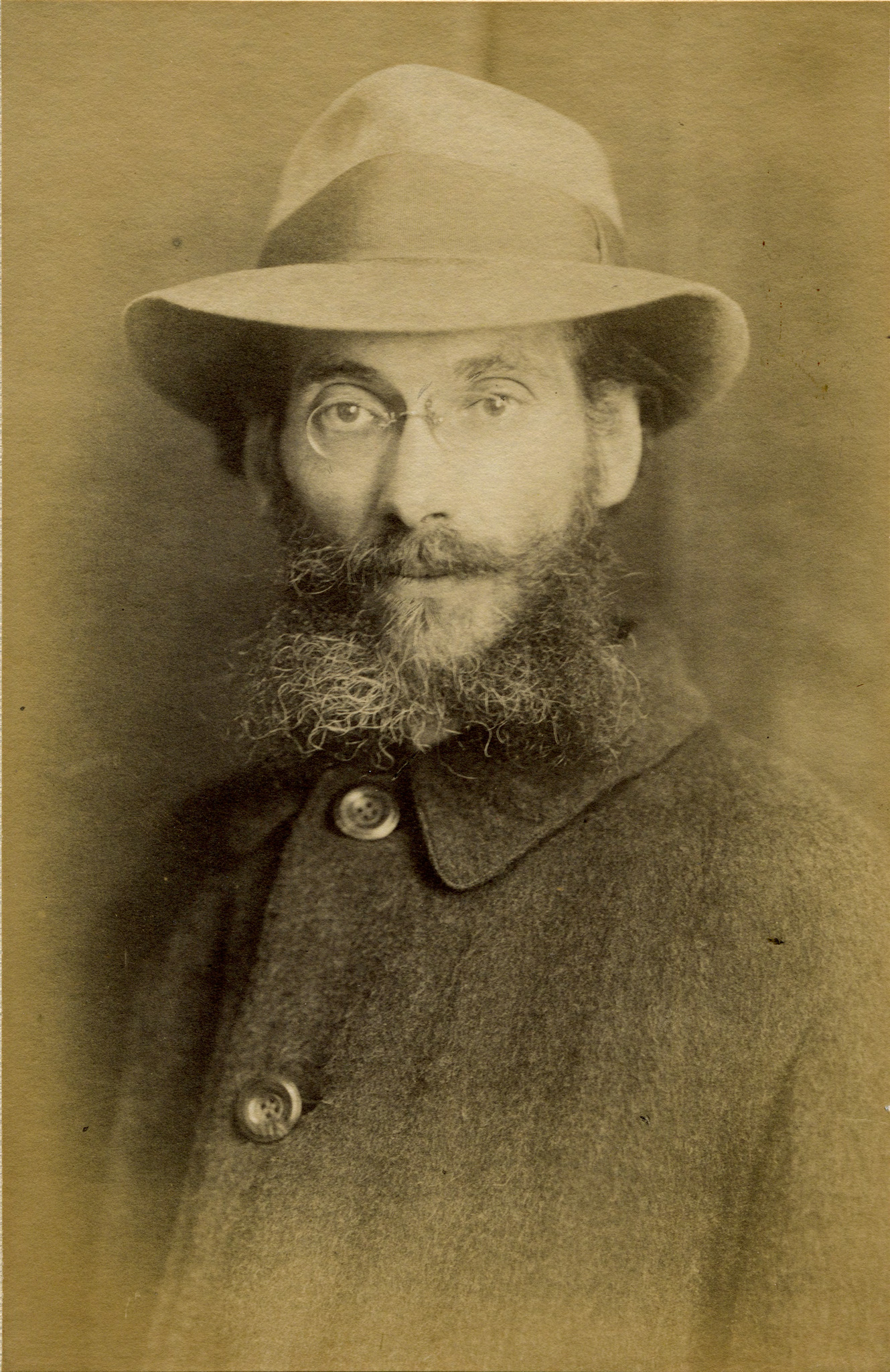
Landauer in 1916

Following the death of his wife Hedwig Lachmann from influenza on 21 February 1918, Landauer was in a state of deep personal crisis. However, by October 1918, with German military collapse imminent, he was called to Munich by Kurt Eisner, leader of the Independent Socialists (USPD) in Bavaria, who proclaimed the Bavarian Republic on 7 November.

Landauer, a lifelong federalist, joined the radical Revolutionary Workers' Council (Revolutionäre Arbeiterrat, RAR) and the Central Workers' Council, advocating for a socialist democracy based on workers' and soldiers' councils (Räte) and opposing parliamentary elections. He grew increasingly despondent as parliamentary forces gained ground and the Bavarian Landtag elections in January 1919 marginalized the radical left.

The assassination of Eisner on 21 February 1919 plunged Munich into chaos. This led to the proclamation of a first, short-lived Bavarian Räterepublik (Council Republic) on 7 April 1919, by anarchists and Independent Socialists. Landauer, despite his reservations about the timing, served as Commissioner for Enlightenment and Public Instruction. He attempted educational reforms, envisioning universities as libertarian cooperative societies. This "Coffee House Anarchists" government lasted only a week before being replaced by a second, Communist-led Räterepublik on 13 April, following an attempted putsch. Landauer refused to cooperate with the Communists, deploring their methods.

On 1 May 1919, as Freikorps and Reichswehr troops sent by the SPD government in Berlin began to crush the Munich Räterepublik, Landauer was arrested at Eisner's former home. On 2 May, he was taken to Stadelheim Prison and brutally beaten to death by soldiers. His last reported words were, "Erschlagt mich doch! Das Ihr Menschen seid!" ("Yes, beat me to death! To think that you are human beings!"). A monument erected to him in Munich's Waldfriedhof in 1925 was destroyed by the Nazis in 1933; his remains were moved to the Munich Jewish Cemetery, where they lie in a double grave that also serves as the resting place of Eisner.

== Legacy ==
Gustav Landauer's primary importance lies in his synthesis of a pacifist, humanitarian, and democratic version of anarcho-socialism with the outlook of völkisch romanticism. His work serves as an antidote to simplistic views that equate völkisch thought solely with its later racist and imperialist interpretations, or socialism exclusively with Marxism. Landauer represented a radical democratic and communitarian strand within the broader romantic reaction against industrial modernity.

His ideas resonated with various left-wing communitarian circles in Germany, including the socialist wing of the youth movement, Zionist socialists like Martin Buber, and Expressionist writers such as Ernst Toller and Georg Kaiser. Landauer's emphasis on Gemeinschaft, spiritual renewal, and decentralized, cooperative living, while ultimately failing to gain mass political traction in his lifetime, prefigured later concerns about the crisis of metropolitan centers and the search for alternative models of community. After his death, his legacy was preserved primarily through the efforts of Martin Buber, who collected and published his writings and letters, including the two-volume Gustav Landauer: sein Lebensgang in Briefen in 1929.

== Works ==
- Skepsis und Mystik (1903)
- Die Revolution (trans. Revolution) (1907)
- Aufruf zum Sozialismus (1911) (trans. by David J. Parent as For Socialism. Telos Press, 1978. ISBN 0-914386-11-5)
- Editor of the journal Der Sozialist (trans. The Socialist) from 1893–1899 and 1909–1915
- "Anarchism in Germany" (1895), "Weak Statesmen, Weaker People" (1910) and "Stand Up Socialist" (1915) are excerpted in Anarchism: A Documentary History of Libertarian Ideas – Volume One: From Anarchy to Anarchism (300 CE–1939), ed. Robert Graham. Black Rose Books, 2005. ISBN 1-55164-250-6
- Gustav Landauer. Gesammelte Schriften Essays Und Reden Zu Literatur, Philosophie, Judentum. (translated title: Collected Writings Essays and Speeches of Literature, Philosophy and Judaica). (Wiley-VCH, 1996) ISBN 3-05-002993-5
- Gustav Landauer. Anarchism in Germany and Other Essays. eds. Stephen Bender and Gabriel Kuhn. Barbary Coast Collective.
- Gustav Landauer. Revolution and Other Writings: A Political Reader, ed. & trans. Gabriel Kuhn; PM Press, 2010. ISBN 978-1-60486-054-2

== See also ==
- List of peace activists

== Citations ==
=== Works cited ===
- Maurer, Charles B. (1971). Call to Revolution: The Mystical Anarchism of Gustav Landauer. Wayne State University Press. ISBN 0-8143-1441-4.
- Lunn, Eugene (1973). Prophet of Community: The Romantic Socialism of Gustav Landauer. Berkeley: University of California Press. ISBN 0-520-02207-6.
