= Rote Revue =

- Categories: Political magazine
- First issue: 1921
- Final issue: 2009
- Country: Switzerland
- Based in: Zurich
- Language: German
- OCLC: 5669332

The Rote Revue was an organ of the Social Democratic Party of Switzerland and existed between 1921 and 2009.

== History and profile ==
Rote Revue was founded by Robert Grimm and Ernst Nobs in 1921. Nobs was its first editor.

From 1921 to 1966, the magazine appeared under the title Rote Revue: sozialistische Monatsschrift (″socialist monthly revue″). From 1967 to 1980 it appeared under the title Profile: sozialdemokratische Zeitschrift für Politik, Wirtschaft und Kultur. From 1980 to 1989 it appeared under the title Rote Revue - Profil: Monatszeitschrift. From 1989 to 2009, it appeared under the title Rote Revue: Zeitschrift für Politik, Wirtschaft und Kultur.

Rote Revue went defunct in 2009. All editions have been made available online by the Swiss Electronic Academic Library Service (SEALS) in 2014.
