= Hermann Greulich =

Swiss politician (1842–1925)

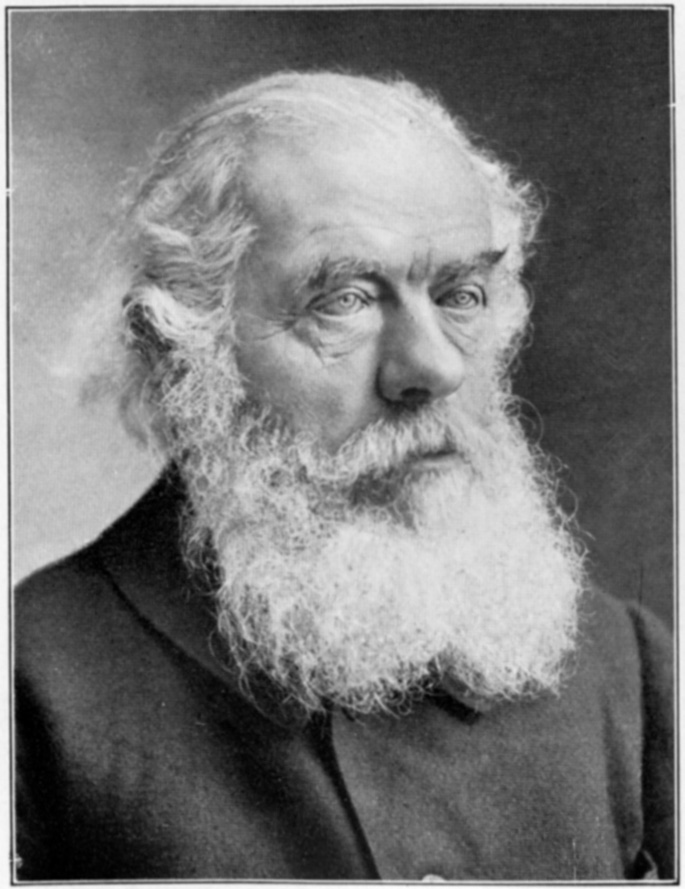
Herman Greulich.

Herman Greulich (9 April 1842, Breslau - 8 November 1925), was a Swiss socialist politician. Greulich was a pioneer of the international socialist movement. He worked side by side with Karl Marx and Friedrich Engels in the First International, and was later active in the Second International.

Greulich died 1925 in Zürich.
