= Grütli Union =

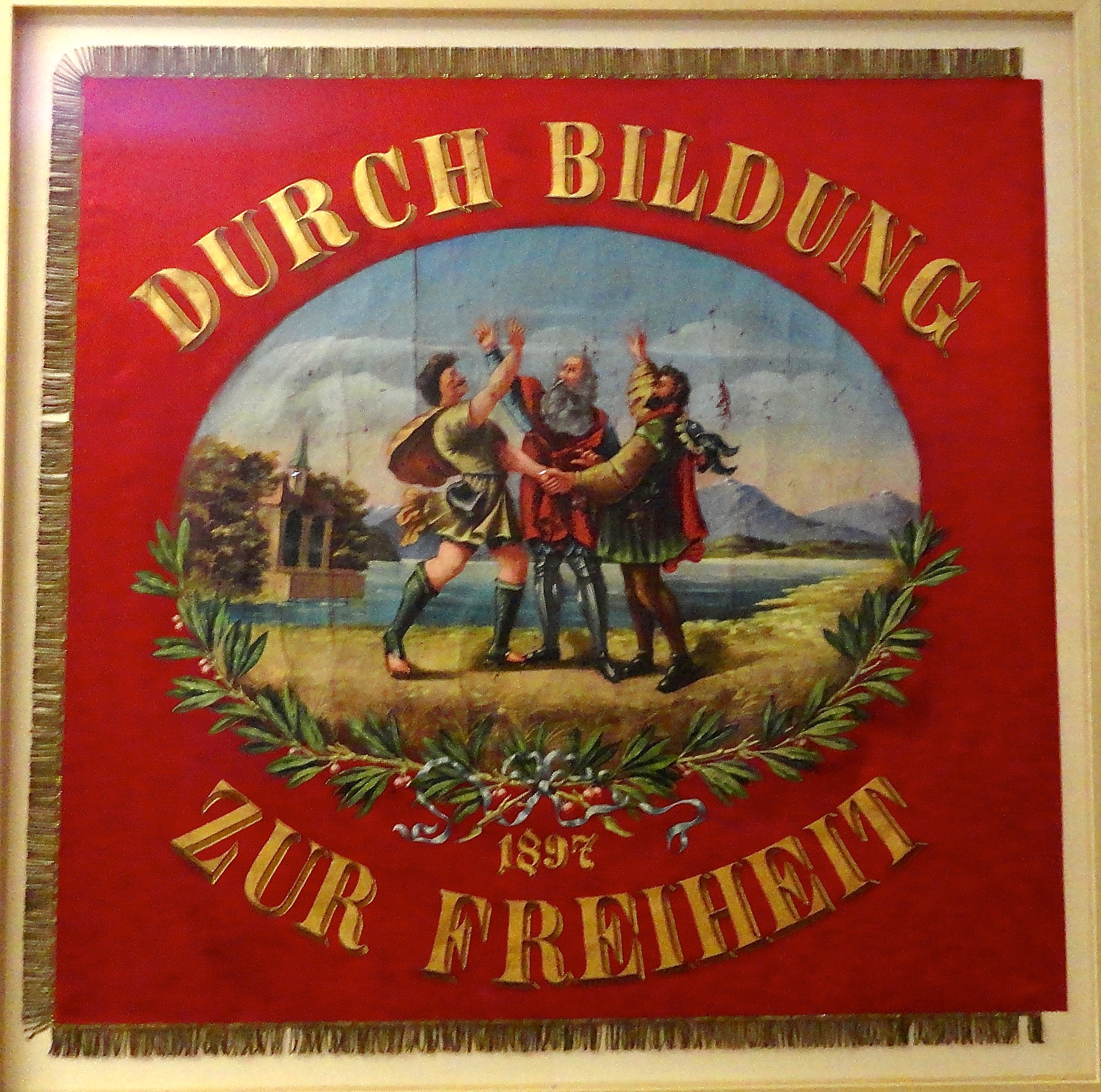
Party banner. Translation: "Through Education comes Freedom"

The Grütli Union (German: Grütliverein; French: Société du Grütli) was a political party in Switzerland.

== History ==
The Union was established in Geneva on 20 May 1838 by Johannes Niederer, and was initially a discussion club for tradespeople. The name was taken from Rütli, an important location in establishing the Old Swiss Confederacy. The organisation initially focussed on education, but later started political activity, playing a leading role in the establishments of trade unions and health insurance. However, it declined after the 1860s following the establishment of the International Workingmen's Association.

In 1878 the Union agreed to adopt a socialist platform, although it refused to merge with the Swiss Workers' Federation. By 1890 it had around 16,000 members, and was far larger than the newly established Social Democratic Party (SP). In 1892 some members helped establish the Bauern- und Arbeiterbund party in Basel-Landschaft, and in 1901 the Union merged with the SP, an event known as the "Solothurn Wedding". By that time the two organisations had a roughly equal number of members.

Differences with the SP led to the Union breaking away in 1916. In the 1917 elections it won three seats; August Rikli in Bern-Oberaargau, Arnold Knellwolf in Bern-Seeland and Hans Jakob Wirz in Zürich-Süd. All three joined the SP faction in the National Council. In the 1919 federal elections the Union won two seats in the National Council, gaining representation in Bern and Zürich. However, it lost both seats in the 1922 elections, and also failed to win a seat in the 1925 elections, in which it received just 427 votes. That year it rejoined the SP and was formally disbanded.
