= Kantonsschule Küsnacht =

Public secondary school in Küsnacht, Zurich, Switzerland

Coordinates: 47°19′01″N 8°34′59″E

Location
- Dorfstrasse 30, 8700 Küsnacht; Küsnacht, Zurich; Switzerland

Information
- Type: Public coeducational
- Established: 1832; 194 years ago
- School district: Meilen
- Principal: Corinne Elsener
- Grades: traditionally Kurzeitmittelschule (9-12), recently also as a Langzeitmittelschule with a bilingual Untergymnasium (9-12)
- Enrollment: 510
- Color: mostly blue
- Nickname: kanti küsnacht
- Website: www.kantonsschulekuesnacht.ch
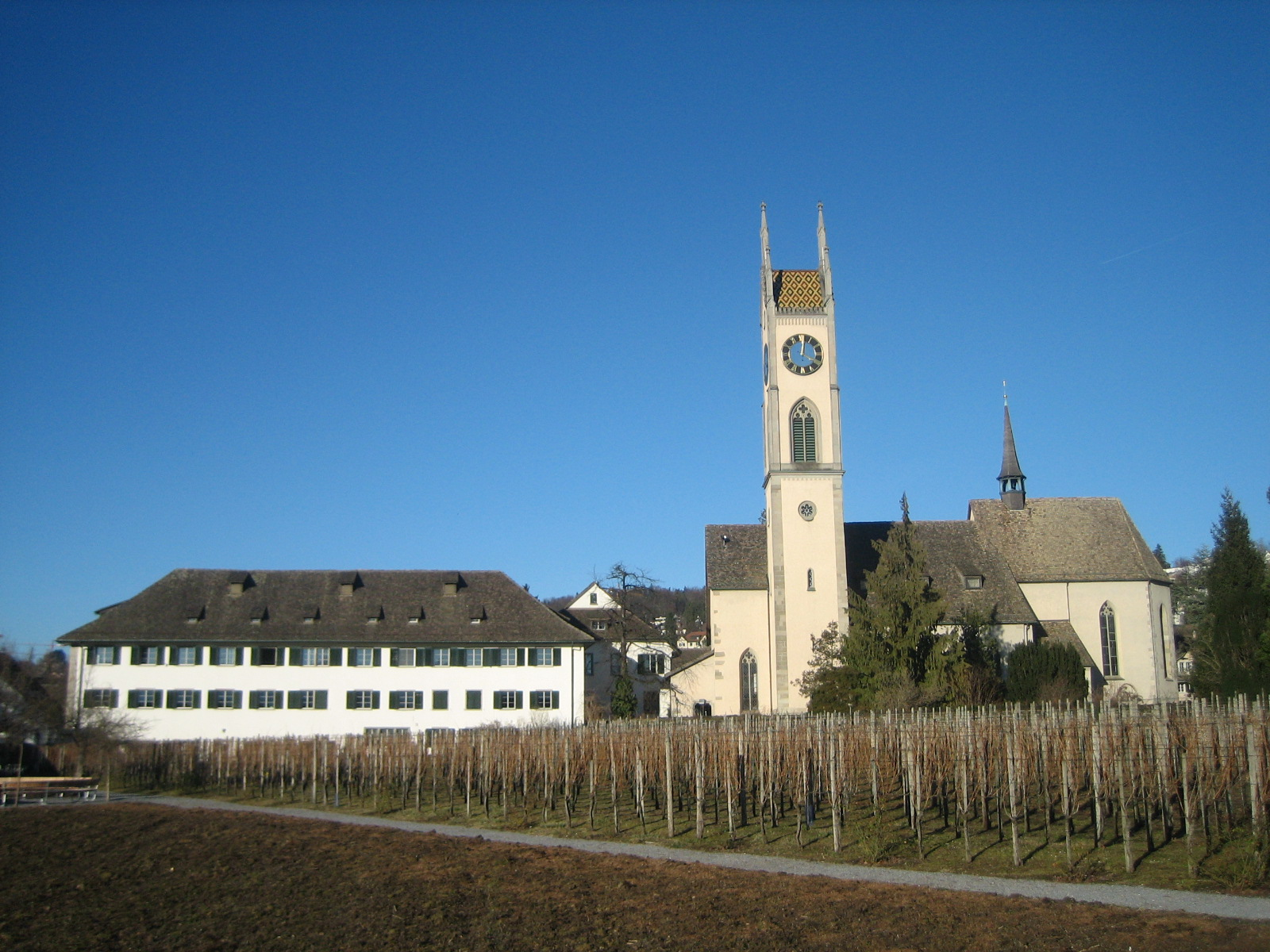
- The Johanniterhaus

The Kantonsschule Küsnacht (KKN), is a secondary school in the municipality of Küsnacht, Canton Zurich. From summer 2026, the school will have 650 students in 26 classes, up from 25 classes in 2025.

It was founded in 1832 and is the oldest school for teacher-education in the canton as well as a very selective school. In 2009, the school was visited by around 510 students. The current head teacher is Corinne Elsener. The school offers a musisches Profil, with a strong focus on music, and a neusprachliches Profil, with the focus being on modern languages, such as Italian and Spanish.

The Kantonsschule Küsnacht offers a lot of extra curricular activities for their students. People can learn dance, parkour and take classes to prepare the numerus clausus. Next to that the student have the possibility to brew beer in their fifth year at the Kantonsschule.

The high school is also famous for making their own wine. Behind the main building is a big field with a lot of grapes and the student cut the grapes that will later be made into a local wine.

The school was formerly known as Seminar Küsnacht.

== Campus ==
The campus of the Kantonsschule Küsnacht is quite big. There is a library, as well as two older buildings (one of them being the Johanniterhaus) and a canteen. Just next to the school there is a church, but they are not affiliated anymore.

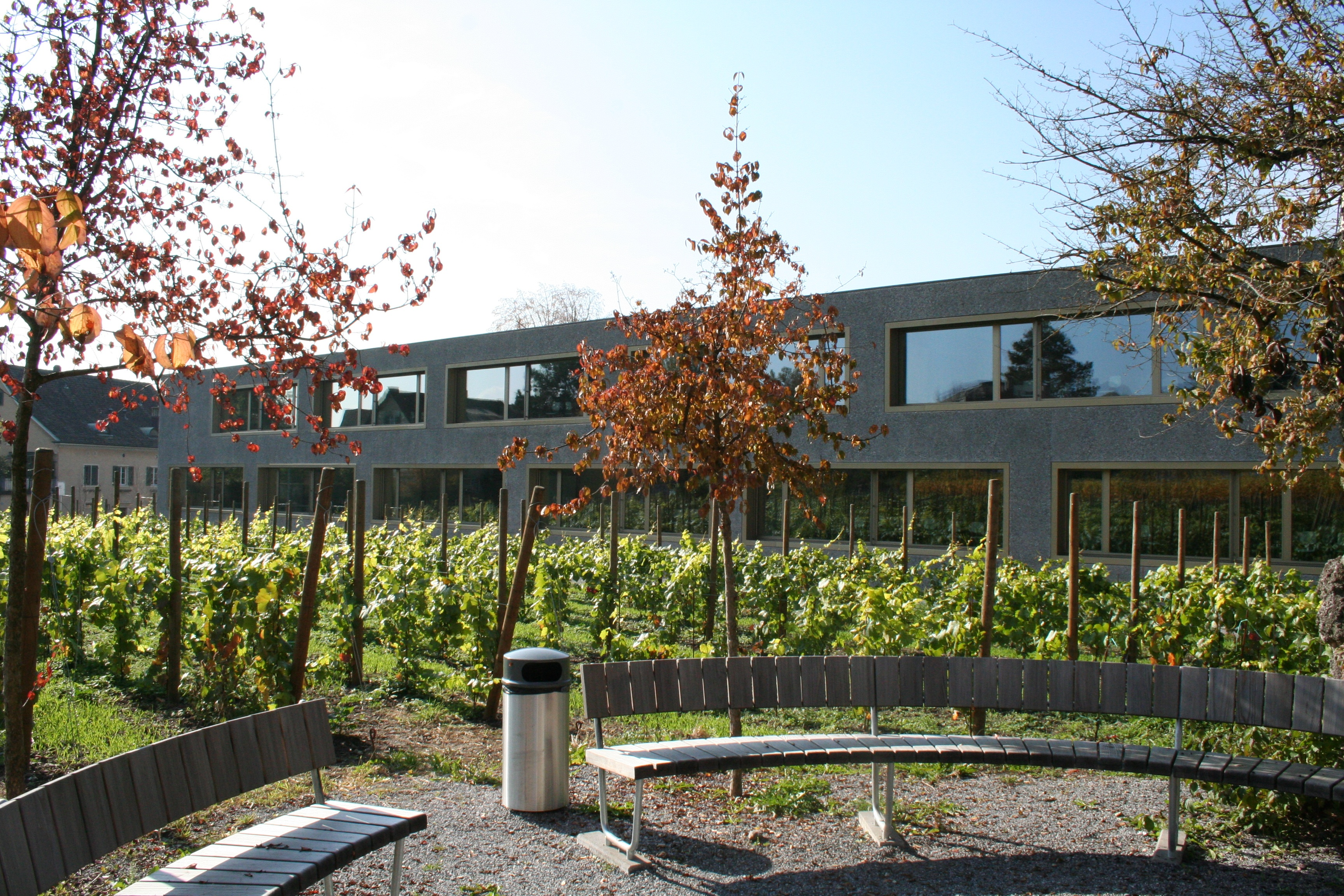
The new building and its wine stock

The school is also very close to lake Zurich, so students often go to spend lunch next to the shore and swim during the break.

== Selectivity ==
The Kantonsschule Küsnacht - as well as all other Kantonsschulen in Zurich - is a very selective school. Only 18% of the Swiss youth gets accepted in this kind of high schools. To get accepted at the Kantonsschule, one has to go to an exam, called the "Gymi-prüfung", a very selective exam that examines the subjects German and math for the "Langzeitgymnasium" and the same subjects as well as French for the "Kurzzeitgymnasium".

Once accepted at the school there is a testing time, called the Probezeit, in which only the best students have the chance to stay at the school (out of an average class of 26 people, about 3 get kicked out even after having a good grade on the exam). If a student is twice in a row almost failing, the student has to repeat the year. Does it happen again, the student has to leave the school.

== Academics ==
The Kantonsschule Küsnacht is known to be an artistic school, by having profiles that mostly profiles on the arts. Students have to choose a major when joining the school. The major that kids can choose of are music, arts, English, Spanish as well as Italian. With all their differences, every student in every major has to attend English, German, French, History, Geography, Biology, Chemistry, Physics, Music, Arts, Economic and Law, Physical education and Math classes.
