= Tony Hearn =

British trade union leader (1929–2019)

David Anthony Hearn (4 March 1929 – 31 December 2019), known as Tony Hearn, was a British trade union leader.

== Biography ==
Hearn attended Trinity College, Oxford. He began working for the Association of Broadcasting Staff (ABS) in 1955, as assistant to the general secretary, Leslie Littlewood. He moved up through the ranks, becoming one of the assistant general secretaries, deputy general secretary and eventually general secretary in 1972. He also became secretary of the loose Federation of Broadcasting Unions.

In 1984, Hearn took the ABS into a merger with the National Association of Theatrical and Kine Employees, which formed the Broadcasting and Entertainment Trades Alliance (BETA). He became joint General Secretary of BETA with John Wilson, then sole head of the union in 1987.

In 1991, he led BETA into a further merger, this time with the Association of Cinematograph Television and Allied Technicians, which produced the Broadcasting, Entertainment, Cinematograph and Theatre Union (BECTU). Hearn became its first general secretary, a position he held until 1993.

Hearn died on 31 December 2019, at the age of 90.

== Sources ==
- Asa Briggs, History of Broadcasting in the United Kingdom

Trade union offices
Preceded by Tom Rhys	General Secretary of the Association of Broadcasting Staff; 1972–1984	Succeeded by post abolished
Preceded by new post	General Secretary of the Broadcasting and Entertainment Trades Alliance; 1984–1991; With: John Wilson (1984–1987)	Succeeded by post abolished
Preceded by new post	General Secretary of the Broadcasting, Entertainment, Cinematograph and Theatre Union; 1991–1993; With: Alan Sapper (1991)	Succeeded by Roger Bolton
