= Gerry Morrissey =

General Secretary of the BECTU

Gerry Anthony Morrissey (born 12 April 1960) is an Irish-born British trade unionist and was the head of the BECTU sector of the Prospect union up until his retirement in 2018. He was succeeded by Philippa Childs.

Born in Tipperary, Ireland, Morrissey attended the local Christian Brothers school. He began his career as a catering buyer at the BBC, joining the Association of Broadcasting Staff in 1977. He became prominent in the union as it underwent a series of mergers to form the Broadcasting, Entertainment, Cinematograph and Theatre Union (BECTU). In 1998, he became one of BECTU's two Assistant General Secretaries. In February 2007, he was elected General Secretary without opposition. He is married with two children. From 2011, Morrissey also served as the President of the Union Network International's Media and Entertainment International section.

Morrissey took BECTU into a merger with Prospect at the start of 2017, and became the first head of the new BECTU sector of Prospect.

Trade union offices
Preceded by Roger Bolton	General Secretary of the Broadcasting, Entertainment, Cinematograph and Theatre Union; 2007 – 2017	Succeeded by Union merged
Preceded by New position	General Secretary of the BECTU Sector of Prospect; 2017 – 2018	Succeeded by Philippa Childs
