= Broadcasting, Entertainment, Communications and Theatre Union =

Trade union

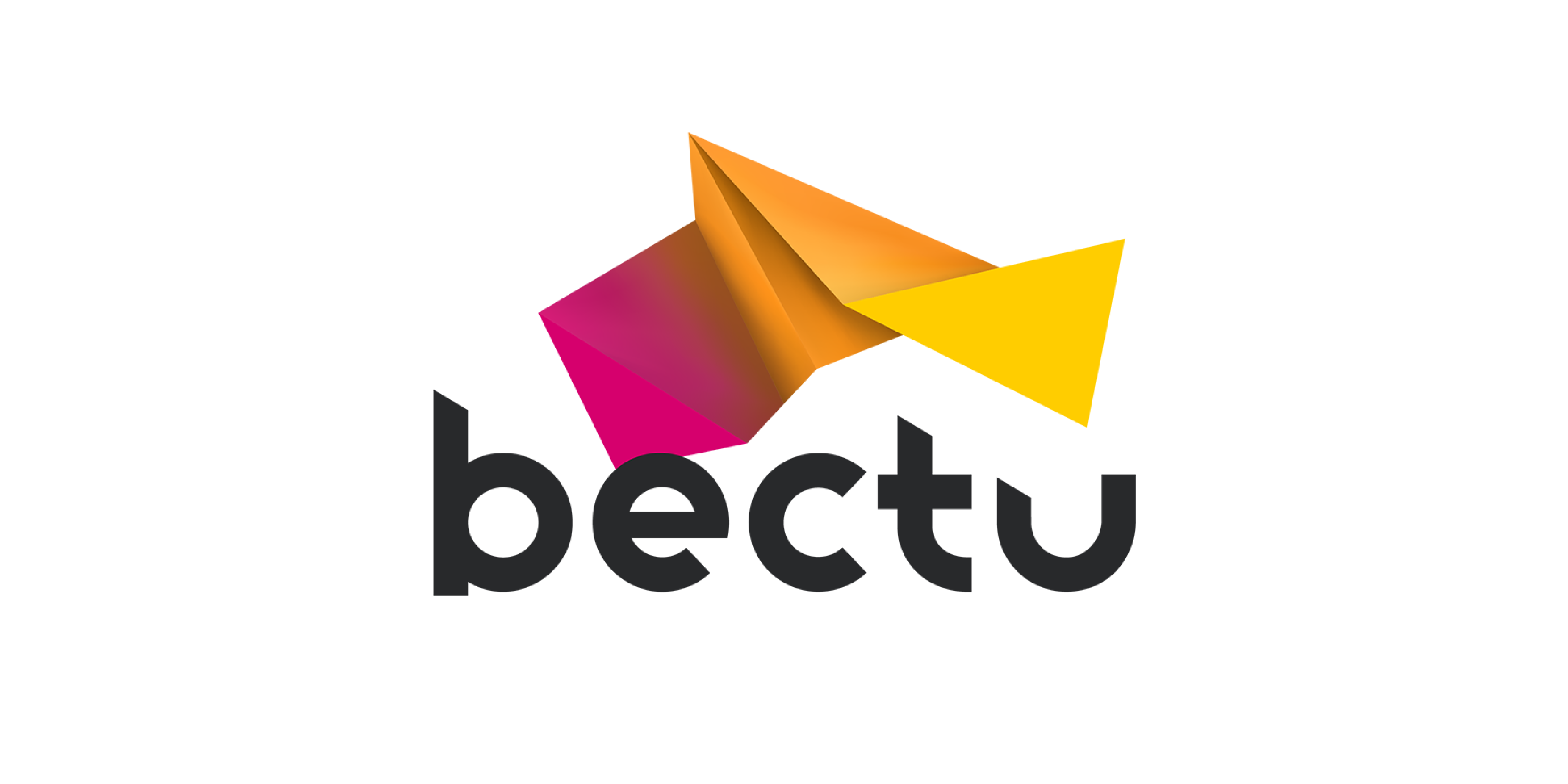
- Merged into: Prospect
- Founded: 1991
- Dissolved: 1 January 2017
- Headquarters: 100 Rochester Row, London, SW1P 1JP
- Location: United Kingdom
- Members: 40,000
- Affiliations: TUC, STUC, UNI, GFTU, ICTU, BEAU
- Website: bectu.org.uk

The Broadcasting, Entertainment, Communications and Theatre Union (BECTU), formerly the Broadcasting, Entertainment, Cinematograph and Theatre Union, is a former British trade union that became a sector of the Prospect trade union in the United Kingdom on 1 January 2017, following the transfer of engagements of BECTU to Prospect. It has approximately 40,000 members who work in broadcasting, film, theatre, IT, telecoms, entertainment, leisure and interactive media.

== History ==
BECTU was founded in 1991 with the merger of the Association of Cinematograph, Television and Allied Technicians and the Broadcasting and Entertainment Trades Alliance, the history of which can be traced back to 1890. In July 1995, the Film Artistes' Association (FAA), founded in 1927 as a trade union for film extras merged to become a sub-division of BECTU.

BECTU's affiliations included the Trades Union Congress, the Scottish Trades Union Congress, Union Network International, the General Federation of Trade Unions and the Federation of Entertainment Unions.

Gerry Morrissey was elected General Secretary in February 2007, after the position had been left vacant due to the death of Roger Bolton, who died from cancer in November 2006.

=== Merger into Prospect ===
BECTU announced in 2014 that it was in merger talks with the Prospect trade union which represents engineers, managers, scientists and other specialists in both the public and private sectors in the UK. Prospect is not currently affiliated to any political party. At the Bectu Annual Conference held on 14 May 2016 it was agreed to ballot Bectu members on the proposed merger with Prospect. It was announced on 30 August 2016 that BECTU members had overwhelmingly voted Yes to the merger with Prospect which took place on 1 January 2017. BECTU became a sector of Prospect, with Morrissey continuing to lead the sector. In 2018, Philippa Childs took over as secretary of the sector.

== Leadership ==
=== General Secretaries ===
1991: Tony Hearn and Alan Sapper
1991: Tony Hearn
1993: Roger Bolton
2007: Gerry Morrissey
2017: Mike Clancy*

*General Secretary of Prospect following the 2017 merger.

=== Head of BECTU (after 2017 merger with Prospect) ===
2017: Gerry Morrissey
2018: Philippa Childs
2027: TBA

=== Presidents ===
1991: Tony Lennon
2010: Christine Bond
2014: Jane Perry
2017: Denise McGuire*
2018: Craig Marshall*
2020: Ann Jones*
2022: Eleanor Wade*

*President of Prospect following the 2017 merger.
