= John Wilson (trade unionist, born 1920) =

British trade unionist

John Wilson (1920 or 1921–1996) was a British trade unionist.

Born in Aberdeen, Wilson trained as a cinema projectionist and became active in the National Association of Theatrical and Kine Employees. He was elected president of this union in 1954, serving for two years, and again in 1966. In 1975, he was elected as general secretary of the union, in which post he merged the union first with the National Association of Executives Managers and Staffs, then with the Association of Broadcasting Staff, to form the Broadcasting and Entertainment Trades Alliance (BETA).

Wilson was appointed as joint general secretary of BETA, serving until his retirement in 1987.

Trade union offices
| Preceded by Robert Keenan | General Secretary of the National Association of Theatrical and Kine Employees; 1975–1984 | Succeeded by Position abolished |
| Preceded by New position | General Secretary of the Broadcasting and Entertainment Trades Alliance; 1984–1987 with Tony Hearn | Succeeded by Tony Hearn |
