= Broadcasting, Entertainment and Arts Unions =

- Founded: 2025 (as BEAU); 1990 (as FEU); 1968 (as CEF)
- Location: United Kingdom
- Members: 5 unions (2026); 150,000 workers (2024)
- Website: beaunions.org.uk

The Broadcasting, Entertainment and Arts Unions (BEAU) is a joint representative body based in the United Kingdom, representing workers in TV, theatre, film, music, gaming, cinema, publishing, new media, and other performing arts.

The body was established in 1968 as the Confederation of Entertainment Unions. In 1991, two of its larger members merged to form the Broadcasting, Entertainment, Cinematograph and Theatre Union (BECTU), and it was reconstituted as the Federation of Entertainment Unions (FEU).

As of 2017, FEU comprised what is now the BECTU section of Prospect along with Equity, the Musicians Union, the National Union of Journalists, the Professional Footballers' Association, Unite and the Writers' Guild of Great Britain. Around 130,000 members in total are in the relevant sections of these unions.

In 2025 the FEU became the BEAU, representing BECTU, Equity, the Musicians Union, the National Union of Journalists, and the Writers' Guild of Great Britain. The BEAU has an associated All-Party Parliamentary Group

== Chair ==
2025: Paul W. Fleming (Equity)

== Presidents ==
1968: George Elvin
1970: Alan Sapper
1991: Position abolished
