= Overtime ban =

Type of strike action

Overtime bans are a type of strike in which workers refuse to engage in overtime work, being any work that falls outside of contracted hours. They do this to leverage their employer into negotiating various working conditions. Often organised in unions, workers may choose this form of industrial action to bargain for a higher rate of pay, better working conditions or to discourage an employer from making redundancies. Unlike a full strike in which employees are usually in breach of their contract, workers engaging in overtime bans are typically well protected. Employers cannot legally withhold normal wages during an overtime ban if employees are not breaching the terms of their employment contracts by refusing to do overtime work. However, the legalities of overtime bans do vary between countries. Overtime bans are effective where "industries and organisations run on such habitually high levels of overtime or goodwill that overtime bans ... can have a significant and immediate impact upon the availability of a good or service". Historically, unions have at times received criticism on ethical grounds for choosing to enact overtime bans. The literature records the occurrence of such bans from the 1800s and there is documentation of their use in four continents.

== Purpose ==
Employees use overtime bans to protest their working conditions and pay. They may also be used to demonstrate to employers that more staff members are needed or that no staff can afford to be let go. Where an employer intends to make redundancies, an overtime ban may be an effective way for workers to persuade their employer into changing their course of action.

== Role and influence of unions ==
Unions frequently sanction and organise overtime bans. They are often responsible for helping workers to agree on the logistics of a ban. Where an industry-wide overtime ban must be carried out at multiple individual places of work, unions play an especially important role in helping workers to act in a unified way.

An example of this occurred when three broadcasting unions known at ACTT, BETA and EETPU collaborated to impose an overtime ban on an English production company called HTV in 1990. They were protesting the planned redundancy of 85 workers. The unions agreed on the ban at a conference and instructed all workers not to engage in overtime work, including freelance contractors. The result of the union action was that it caused significant disruption to the daily functioning of the company, forcing it to reschedule a number of their productions and miss routine news coverage that viewers would have expected to see.

An overtime ban was used to bargain for increased pay rates when the Association of Broadcasting and Allied Staffs (ABS) incited members to stop working overtime for the BBC in the Christmas and New Year period of 1978/1979 in London. Workers had been chronically dissatisfied with the rate of pay after the government had set a limit for industry pay increases of 5%. By strategically putting pressure on the BBC, workers could effectively force the BBC to, in turn, lobby the government to lift the 5% rule. The BBC, which relied heavily on overtime workers to create and air their programmes on time, was unable to deliver much of the television schedule that had been planned over the peak period. When shows were not aired, the BBC showed messages on the screen such as the ones depicted, to make the company's situation known publicly in an attempt to attract the government's attention. Below is an excerpt from Tubeworker, a magazine produced by workers and published by an organisation called Workers' Liberty. It provides an example of how a union may go about mobilising its workers. In this case, the National Union of Rail, Maritime and Transport Workers (RMT), were encouraging its members to consider organising an overtime ban in a larger effort to secure a pay increase and to prohibit compulsory redundancies.

"This action must and will go ahead. We cannot back down without a serious win. We want a one year real terms pay rise, no compulsory redundancies and no more bullying and will not accept a trade-off between these demands. We should all join picket lines. Branches should plan them, bring new people, make it fun! We need a strategy to win... RMT needs to set more strikes to show we are serious and pile pressure on management. 'Action short of strike' can keep momentum between strikes: 'work to rule', overtime ban, revenue strike. Think what action could have an impact where you work, and feed it back to the union."

== History and legalities ==
=== North America ===
The acting Governor of New Jersey, Donald T. DiFrancesco, signed off on a law that became effective in 2003 that protected nurses engaged in overtime bans. It stipulated that nurses would not be acting criminally if they refused to engage in work beyond their contracted 40-hour week. Only in "emergency circumstances" could employers refuse to abide by this law, defined as "an unpredictable or unavoidable occurrence at (an) unscheduled interval relating to health care delivery that requires immediate action". The law was first effective for nurses in acute care and after six months was extended to other facilities including nursing homes. Jeannemarie Otersen, a healthcare union advocate, described the law as the "first and strongest" in the country, as it would allow nurses to engage in industrial action without breaking the law or fearing for the loss of their jobs.

In May 2000, pilots who refused to work overtime meant that United Airlines had to cancel approximately 150 flights throughout the US. The pilots were motivated to enact the ban because they felt that issues regarding their contracts – including problems related to "wages, job security and benefits" – had not been satisfactorily addressed by United Airlines during the negotiation period. The Air Line Association (ALA), the union responsible for mobilising pilots, commented that they warned the airline "for months of an imminent pilot shortage".

=== Africa ===
==== South Africa ====
South African law encourages workers to reach settlements with employers before carrying out industrial actions of any sort, including overtime bans. It is a criminal offence for employees to engage in an overtime ban, or any sort of strike, without first exhausting the 'statutory dispute settlement' options available to them, which include the option to settle negotiations in court. However, if this fails, South African workers may conduct overtime bans without violating the law and are actually protected by it. The South African law concerning overtime bans has evolved from judgments handed down in pivotal cases, called case law. This case law mostly surrounds the interpretation of the Labour Relations Act 28 of 1956 and a particular few of its sections. In the case of Macsteel (Pty) Ltd v National Union of Metalworkers of SA & Others (1989) 10 ILJ 285 (IC), employees were found to be using an overtime ban as an "unfair labour practice" because it was being used to "soften up" the employer prior to negotiations being reached during statutory dispute settlement. In the case of Silver Oak Tanneries t/a Silverton Tannery v Garment & Allied Workers Union (October 1989 (case NH 12/3/286), however, the court found that "preventing an overtime ban would amount to compelling an employee to commit a criminal offence... forcing him to work without consent". Context is therefore of paramount importance to South African courts when they determine the legality of an overtime ban.

=== Europe ===
==== Nordic Countries ====
In Nordic countries, being Sweden, Denmark, Norway and Finland, a high percentage of the population is employed by the public sector and belong to centralised, nationwide trade unions founded in the 19th and 20th centuries. The Unions are typically well organised and hold a great deal of power over employers, who understand that employees are loyal to their union and are likely to carry out the industrial action that they threaten. The legislation in each of the countries aims to limit industrial conflict. For this reason, unions and employers are highly motivated to settle disputes through negotiation before any form of industrial action, including overtime bans, are implemented. In the early 20th century, each of the countries established mediation institutions to help unions and employers reach agreements. Where this fails, overtime bans are permitted by law and intervention by the government is very rare.

In February 2020, the Finnish airline Finnair experienced an overtime ban imposed by workers of the aviation workers' union AIU. Passengers who had scheduled flights were advised to pack minimal luggage that could fit in overhead storage space because staff responsible for baggage handling duties were not engaging in overtime duties. Passengers were also asked to arrive earlier than usual for flights given the staff shortages. The ban lasted three days following a breakdown in communication between staff and Finnair who "struggled to find common ground on a new collective bargaining agreement". The previous employment agreement that had stipulated "wages and other terms and conditions" had just expired.

==== United Kingdom ====
The Clearing Bank Union (CBU) was responsible for mobilising workers in the financial sector to threaten and enact a number of successful overtime bans between 1985 and 1989. The union formed after the Banking, Insurance and Finance Unions at big clearing banks including NatWest, Barclays, Lloyds and Midland joined forces. In 1985, the CBU voted in favour of an overtime ban to protest about their pay. The threat of the ban was sufficient to cause the banks to increase their pay offer which was accepted. In 1987, 70,000 members in Lloyds, NatWest and Barclays decided to enact an overtime ban for 16 weeks following unsuccessful negotiations with management for a pay rise. Workers at the bank TSB secured a pay rise during negotiations, but joined the overtime ban when the company "increased its services without increasing its staff levels". Lloyds improved its workers' pay conditions so that they matched those being offered at Midland. The other banks came to agreements that satisfied the union and were accepted by workers who then returned to work as usual.

=== Australia ===
In Australia, laws governing the legality of overtime bans are written in legislation. They are detailed in the Fair Work Act 2009 which aims to promote "productivity and fairness" in the workplace. It stipulates that employers cannot withhold wages from employees who engage in overtime bans if they are not breaking their contractual obligations. Unless overtime work is overtly agreed upon and in the employee's contract, they are free to decline to engage in overtime work.

From 1908, a Sydney based engineering company called Mort's Dock became the subject of multiple overtime bans. They were imposed by employees who had a "long history of organisation and mobilisation". They formed two unions: The Amalgamated Society of Engineers and the Federated Society of Boilermakers. Mort's Dock was initially hiring and dismissing its workers 'job-to-job', meaning that most workers "experienced irregular and unstable patterns of employment". The practice was for workers to line up each morning in the hope of securing work for that day. Mort's Dock also privileged a small group of workers with large amounts of overtime work so that they could avoid hiring more hands throughout the day. By consistently imposing overtime bans, the unions "forced Mort's Dock to employ more workers". Leadership within the union was of utmost importance in achieving this result. Falkinham, who was the president of the Boilermakers Society, was responsible for mobilising workers to line up for work three times a day. This prevented the company from being able to complain of a shortage of workers; an excuse that they could have used to justify giving all of the overtime work to only a few employees. In 1917, when these workers were denied a wage increase, the two unions worked together to impose overtime bans on night shift work which they continued until 1919 when Mort's Dock increased their wage. The bans are described as being examples of strong collective workforce action that effectively undermined the company's ability to treat its workers unfairly.

== Controversy ==
In 2019, nurses who were part of the Nurses of the Psychiatric Nurses Association in Ireland imposed an overtime ban to address "recruitment and retention" issues. The Irish Minister for Health, Simon Harris, considered this to be an irresponsible decision that put vulnerable people at risk due to the lack of care available to them during the strike period.

Another case of controversy arose when the London government was criticised by its mayor in 2016 when "thousands of commuters suffered" because train drivers imposed an overtime ban to protest their working conditions. He felt that "the ongoing chaos on Southern rail services is a total disgrace that is badly failing commuters who just want to get to work and back. The unions should cancel the strikes and get back around the negotiating table, but the government are washing their hands of this crisis and abandoning commuters in the process." It is not uncommon for overtime bans to attract scrutiny.
