= Roger Bolton =

Roger Bolton may refer to:

- Roger Bolton (broadcaster) (born 1945), British radio and television producer and presenter
- Roger Bolton (trade unionist) (1947–2006), British trade unionist in the broadcasting industry
