= Herbert Elvin =

Herbert Elvin may refer to:

- Herbert Elvin (trade unionist) (1874–1949), British trade unionist
- Herbert Lionel Elvin (1905–2005), his son, British education leader
