= 1989–1990 British ambulance strike =

Labour dispute in the UK

British ambulance strike
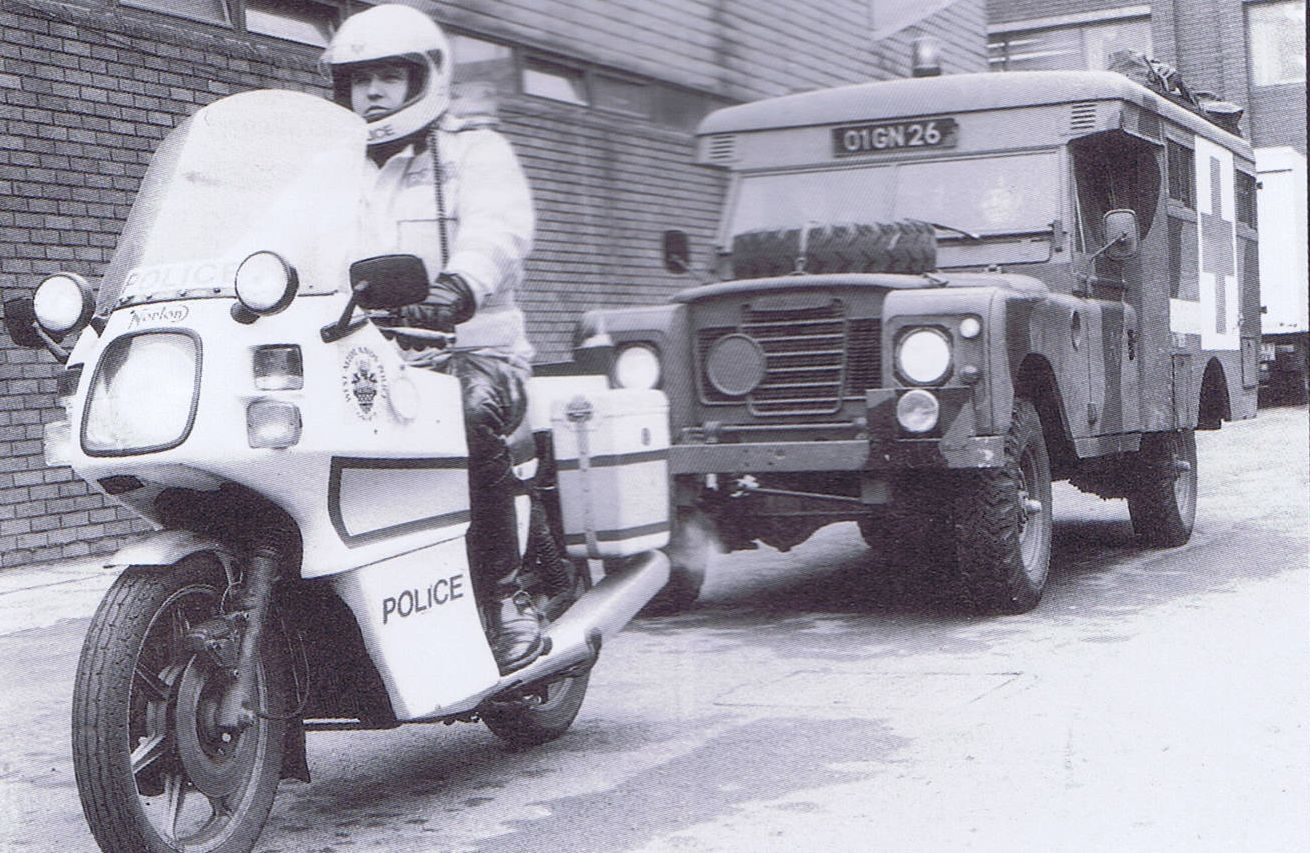
- A West Midlands Police motorcyclist escorts a British Army ambulance during the strike.
- Date: 7 September 1989 – 23 February 1990 (5 months, 2 weeks and 2 days)
- Location: United Kingdom
- Caused by: Overtime ban
- Status: Ended

British ambulance workers went on strike from 7 September 1989 to 23 February 1990 as part of a dispute over pay between ambulance crews and the government. Ambulance workers were aggrieved that their pay had fallen behind that of firefighters with which it had been linked in 1985. A government pay offer of 7.5% was rejected by the five ambulance workers unions, which demanded a 25.8% rise. Union action started with an overtime ban but escalated to a full refusal of crews to attend non-emergency calls in November. The government used the British Army, volunteer ambulances and the police to mitigate the effects of the strike. A pay deal of 16.9% was reached on 23 February 1990 and the ambulance crews returned to work. The strike was regarded as a success for the union, which had carefully cultivated public opinion throughout.

== Background ==
Ambulance provision in the United Kingdom was organised on a local basis by separate ambulance services. The pay and the conditions of employees in those services had last been agreed by the Standing Commission on Pay Comparability in 1979. The commission recognised that morale was low and recommended a pay increase of 25.8% while annual inflation was around 16%. However, the ambulance workers had gone on strike in 1981 to 1982 over pay, with emergency cover being provided by the police. As a result of the strike, a new salary scale was agreed in November 1985 that linked pay to that of firefighters.

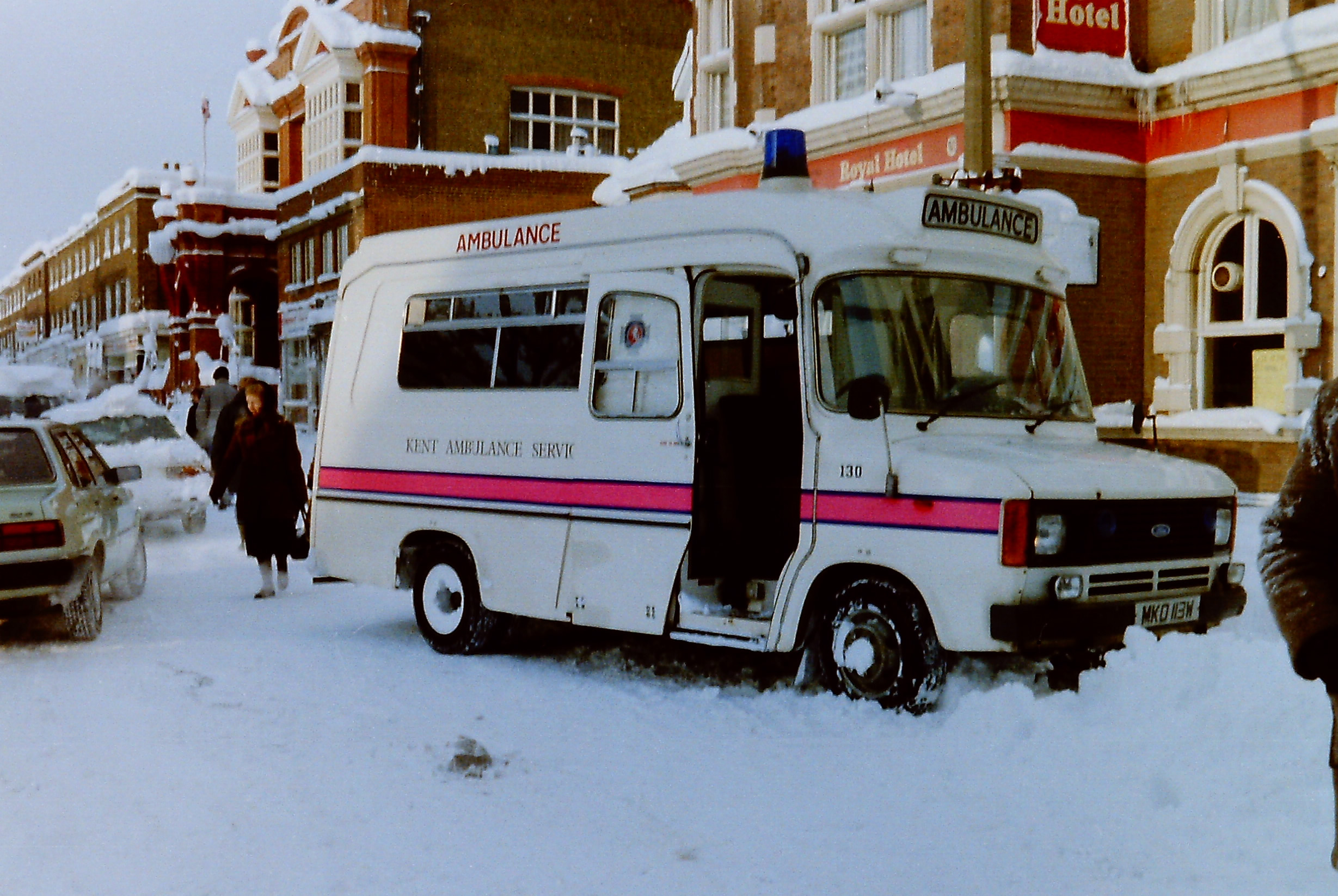
A Kent Ambulance Service vehicle pictured in 1987

The fire brigades union and the police secured favourable pay settlements, which broke the link, and by 1989, ambulance workers were paid 11% less than firefighters. The ambulance workers, represented by five trade unions, considered that they had been forgotten and that the service was being run "on the cheap". The unions sought to restore the link established in the 1985 settlement and petitioned the government for a £20 per week pay rise for their members. They also wanted funding to train their members in paramedic skills.

The Conservative government, led by Margaret Thatcher, was keen not to raise inflation by awarding further pay increases. It was also carrying out reform of the National Health Service and thought that would be cemented by a win over the unions. In May 1989, the government offered a 7.5% pay rise; the unions recommended their members to accept that, but it was rejected by a large majority. The unions seemed to have underestimated their members' feelings.

== Limited service ==
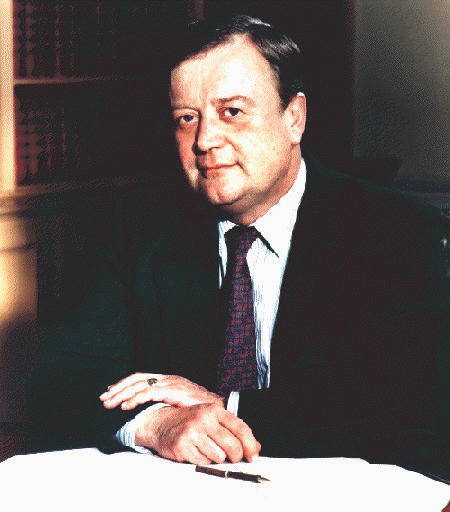
Kenneth Clarke, pictured in the 1990s

Ambulance service crews voted on 7 September 4:1 to implement an overtime ban and a ban on rest-day working from 13 September. The ambulance services had relied on those additional hours to provide non-emergency services such as the transport of patients between hospitals. The services mitigated the effect of the union action by using private taxis to transport patients and asking, if possible, for patients to provide their own transport. Health Secretary Kenneth Clarke rejected an offer by the unions to enter arbitration on 22 September and caused negotiations to collapse. Later that month, ambulance service officers and controllers voted to join the overtime ban from 4 October, which reduced the options available to the ambulance services.

From late September, the negotiating committees of the ambulance officers and ambulance crew unions agreed to operate jointly despite previous tension between them. Roger Poole was selected as chief negotiator for the workers in the dispute and eventually came to represent members from five separate unions. Ambulance drivers, in particular, had been reliant upon overtime payments to supplement their basic wage and by early October were warning that they might have to soon return to work. The union responded in mid-October by escalating the action in an attempt to restart negotiations. A ban on some clerical work and non-urgent patient transfers was implemented. The latter caused issues, as in previous actions, doctors had responded by simply labelling all transfers as urgent, which increased the volume of work for the thinly-stretched ambulance services. Other measures included lock-outs and sit-ins at depots and a public petition, which eventually attracted 4 million signatures in support of the ambulance workers.

There was little government response to the new measures, apart from to put the British Army on standby from 30 October to provide ambulance services if needed. The unions escalated matters further from November, with emergency ambulance crews restricted to emergency 999 calls and no longer providing transfer services.

== Strike ==
The government responded to the union escalation by threatening to dock the pay of crews who refused to carry out non-emergency work or to suspend them. The unions then advised that if any member was suspended, all members in that ambulance service should declare themselves as suspended. However, the union asked those members to continue to provide an emergency service though they would be unpaid.

In London, some 2,500 ambulance workers, responsible for 455 ambulances in 71 depots, were suspended by 7 November. The government thought that allowing ambulance workers to continue to respond to emergency calls on an unpaid basis would be bad publicity, and the police and the army were called in to provide emergency coverage. The first army ambulances were deployed on 8 November in London and, together with police and volunteer ambulance crews, ran 51 vehicles that day. That marked the first occasion that army ambulances had been used since the Winter of Discontent.

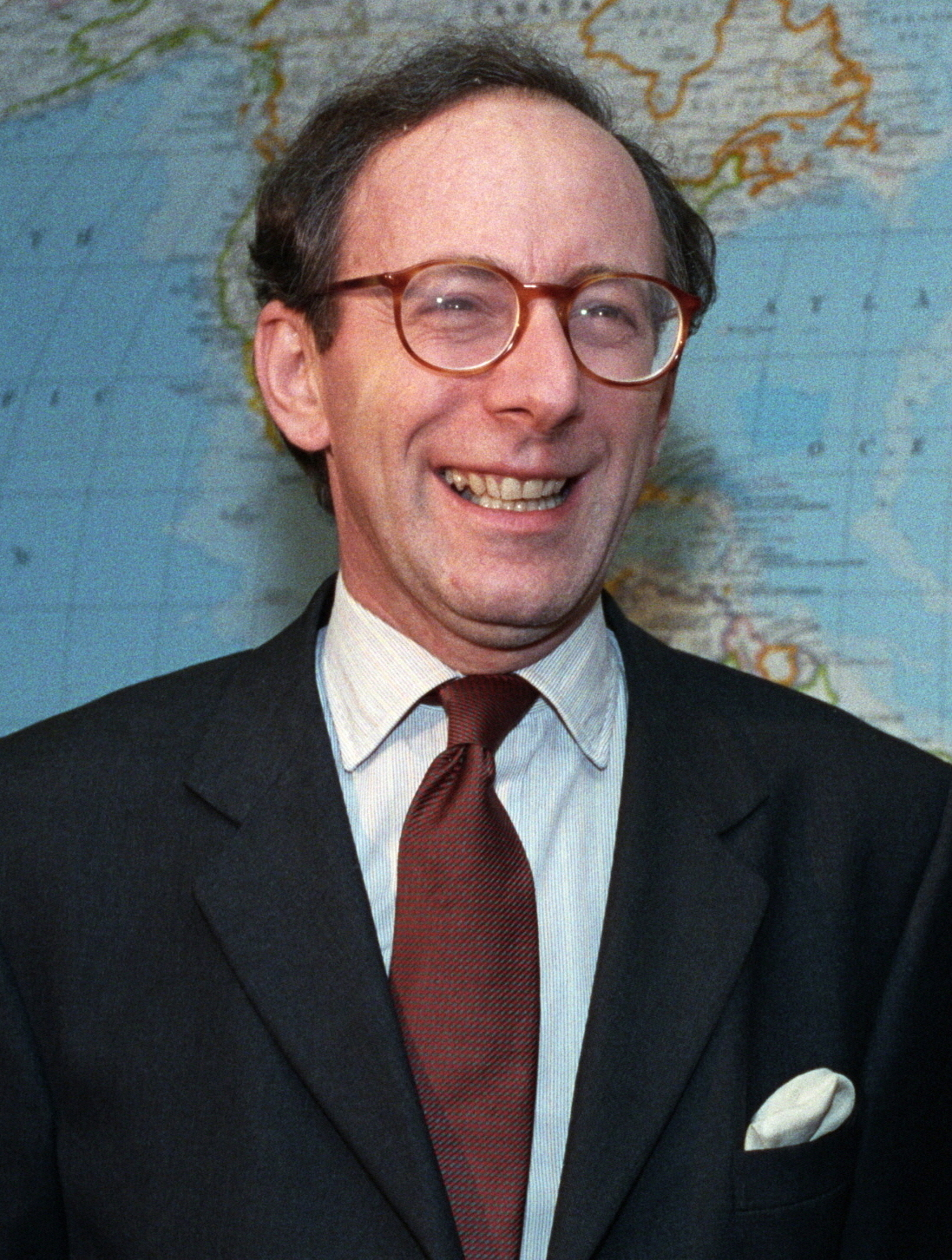
Malcolm Rifkind, pictured in 1993

In Glasgow, ambulance crews voted, by a narrow margin, against the advice of their union officials, for an all-out strike from 1 December, including the withdrawal of emergency response. The strike lasted until 3 December and Scottish Secretary Malcolm Rifkind arranged for 30 army ambulances to provide emergency cover based out of Territorial Army (TA) drill halls. They and police-manned ambulances, had responded to 200 calls by the early hours of 2 December. Rifkind alleged that the crews in Edinburgh had also refused to respond to emergency calls, but the crews disputed that.

By December, the British Army had been providing emergency ambulance services in Lincolnshire, Hertfordshire, Derbyshire and South Yorkshire. In Surrey, Royal Navy and Royal Air Force drivers were also used, alongside ambulances single-crewed by ambulance service managers, to provide a service based out of police stations and TA drill halls.

The ambulance unions attempted to reopen negotiations by dropping demands for a cut to working hours, additional leave and further long service perks. The government refused to make any compromises, and with few options left, the unions carried out further action in January. Crews were instructed to refuse calls put through by the ambulance service and to respond only to those made directly by the police, the medical services and the general public. The unions hoped that would require the deployment of more army ambulances and swing public opinion behind them. The unions asked the public to demonstrate support for the strike by lining the streets at mid-day on 30 January. Around that time, some union members lost patience and crews in West Sussex, Manchester and North-West London went on wildcat strikes of all services. A London-wide strike was narrowly averted at a meeting of shop stewards. In other places, ambulance crews began to drift back to work.

== Resolution ==
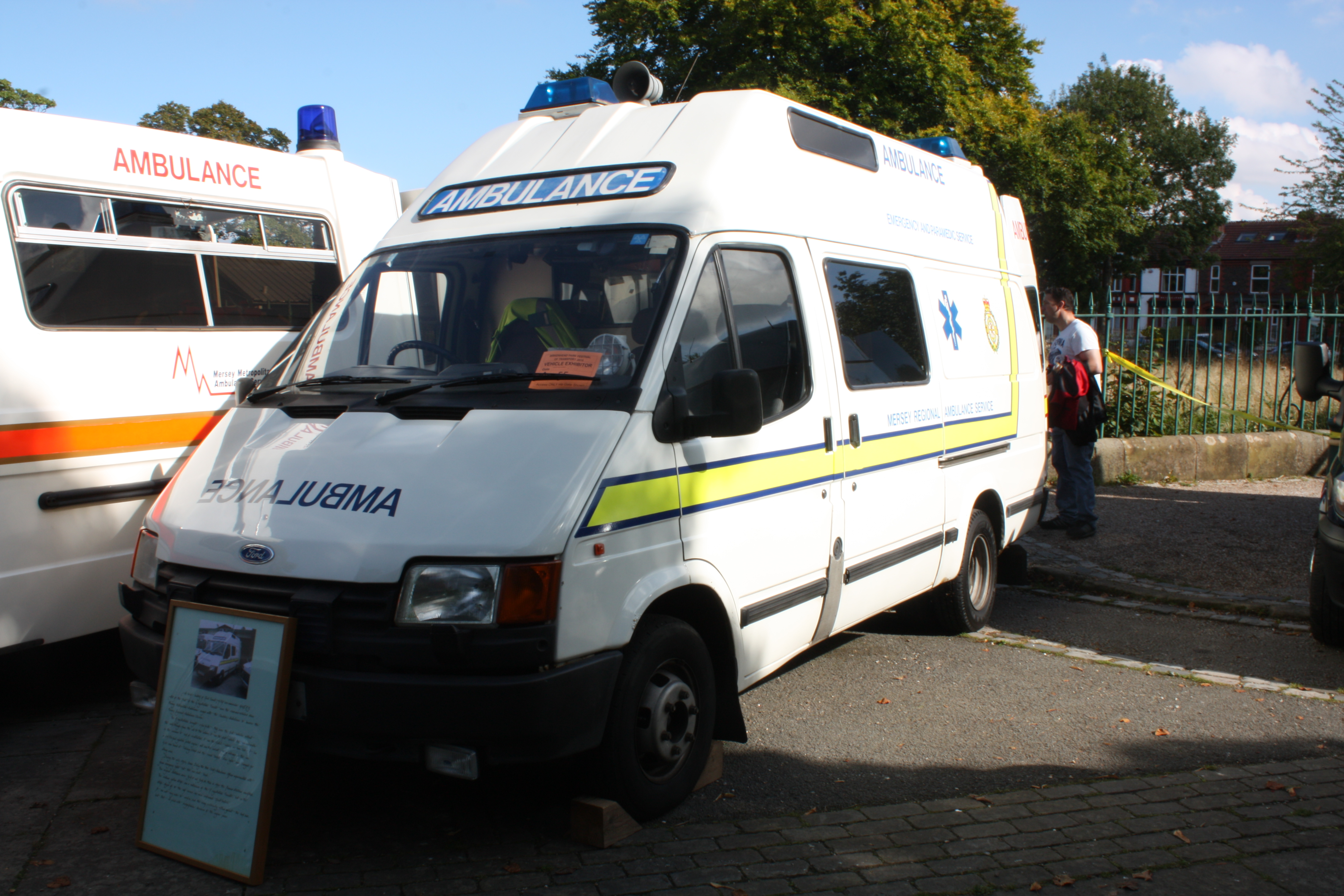
A 1990 Mersey Regional Ambulance Service vehicle

In February, the government made an indication that it was considering a revised pay offer but that was actually a stalling tactic, as it was waiting for public opinion to turn against the unions, which were losing large amounts of their funds in paying strike benefits to their members. The National Union of Public Employees (NUPE) alone had paid out almost £1 million, and both the Transport and General Workers' Union and GMB were in deficit because of the strike. The non-ambulance crew members of those unions questioned why such large amounts were being spent on action that affected only a small portion of the membership. Indeed, the costs were so high that a pay dispute for ancillary workers, some of the lowest paid in the health service, was postponed because of a lack of funds.

The unions escalated the strike further on 15 February by instructing members not to follow any orders issued by senior ambulance service managers. By then, the British Army was operating in 18 ambulance service areas.

Both two parties were brought together for conciliation talks by the Advisory, Conciliation and Arbitration Service. A joint industrial council was formed to consider a deal, but talks broke down over the issue of back pay for suspended workers. The government eventually relented on that issue, and talks resumed on 22 February. A mutually-acceptable pay rise of 16.9% over two years was agreed in the early hours of 23 February. The government also granted a £500 per year bonus to ambulance crew members, with additional medical training and a further 2% pay rise in services, which could offset the cost through efficiency savings.

A vote of ambulance service workers approved the deal by 4:1; members of NUPE, the largest ambulance union, voted 85% in favour on a 74% turnout. The strike, one of the most successful of the Thatcher era, was called off. Poole claimed that the settlement he secured "drove a coach and horses" through the government's pay policy and in recognition of his success was named a runner-up in the Today programme's Man of the Year award. The strike led to greater recognition of the skill involved in the work of the ambulance crews and began their transformation into multi-skilled paramedics.

== Public opinion ==
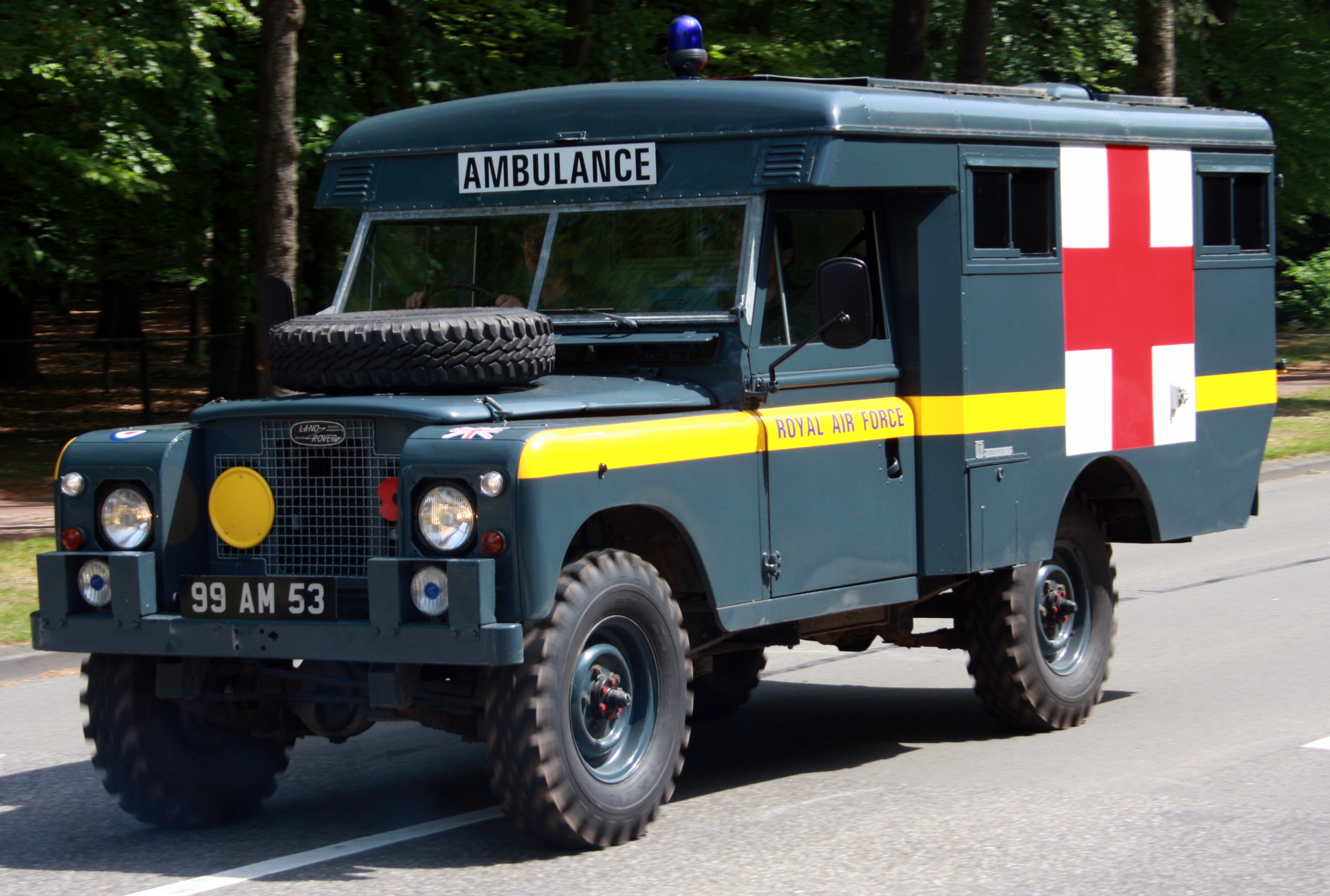
A Royal Air Force Land Rover ambulance of the type used during the strike

The strike has been noted for the close attention paid to public opinion during the dispute. The ambulance unions worked hard to court public approval and conducted polling throughout the strike to judge this. The recent Marchioness disaster of 20 August 1989 reminded the public of the importance of the emergency services, and the ambulance crews' decision to respond to the Deal barracks bombing of 22 September 1989 was well received. The unions' efforts to ensure emergency cover was preserved was judged to be key to maintaining public approval. It was also noted that Poole's calm demeanour was well received by the public, but Clarke's brusque manner and confrontational negotiation style led him to be perceived as a bully.

The government attempted to mobilise public opinion against the strike by briefing the press on alleged incidents in which ambulance crews had refused to respond to emergencies. They included claims, later proved to be false, that a crew in Becontree had refused to respond to a call about a newborn baby found in a ditch; that another crew refused to attend a call out to a man with a severed foot and that one West Midlands ambulance station refused to provide emergency coverage for 48 hours. Clarke was questioned over the false claims in Parliament, when they ceased. Another public relations move was implemented on 17 November; the government's pay offer of 6.5% over 12 months was amended to 9% over 18 months. While having little cost impact that appeared more generous. The Department of Health also took out full-page advertisements in national newspapers from 27 November, ostensibly to provide information on ambulance coverage but largely an attempt to sway public opinion. The unions judged that they were ineffective. Opinion polls conducted during the strike showed public support of around 80% in favour of strikers, including support of 75% among Conservative voters. At its highest, only 10% of the public supported the government.

It was judged that the unions' appointment of Poole as a single spokesman and negotiator was a good move, especially compared with the government's fragmented response. A number of different spokesmen acted for the government and sometimes gave contradictory briefings, which led to a public perception of a lack of co-ordination and competence. The Labour Party was steadfast in its support for the strike, but there were splits in the Conservative Party, encouraged by lobbying from the unions. Some Conservative backbenchers spoke with Clarke privately to suggest for him to agree a resolution to the strike. The Labour Party attempted to capitalise on that by raising a debate in Parliament on the government's handling of the strike. That had the opposite effect, as Conservative MPs rallied to support the government.
