= Roger Bolton (trade unionist) =

British trade unionist

Roger William Bolton (7 September 1947, Dublin, Ireland – 18 November 2006, Woking, Surrey) was a British trade unionist.

Roger Bolton left Dublin with his family in 1958 when they moved to London. He began his career as a photographic technician at Boots the Chemist before moving to the BBC and became a prominent member of the BBC trade union, the Association of Broadcasting Staff (ABS).

In 1979, he began working for the ABS, and remained a union employee though a series of mergers in which it became the Broadcasting and Entertainment Trades Alliance and finally the Broadcasting, Entertainment, Cinematograph and Theatre Union (BECTU).

Bolton rose to prominence during a successful pay dispute with the BBC in 1989, and was elected General Secretary of BECTU in 1993.

He married Elaine Lewis in 1974 and they had one child, a daughter.

Roger Bolton died from cancer, aged 59, in 2006. He was replaced by Gerry Morrissey.

== Sources ==
- BECTU News - General Secretary dies at 59

Trade union offices
Preceded by Tony Hearn	General Secretary of BECTU; 1993 – 2006	Succeeded by Gerry Morrissey
