= Writers' Guild of Great Britain =

Trade union for professional writers

Writers' Guild
- Writers' Guild of Great Britain
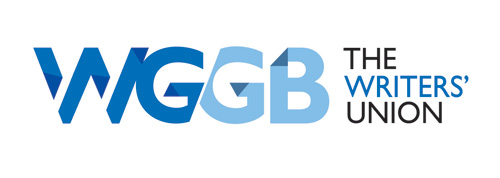
- Founded: 1959; 67 years ago
- Headquarters: London, England
- Location: Great Britain
- Members: ▼3,074 (2024)
- General Secretary: Eleanor Peers
- Affiliations: TUC; STUC; IAWG; FEU
- Website: www.writersguild.org.uk
- Formerly called: Television and Screen Writers' Guild

The Writers' Guild of Great Britain (WGGB), established in 1959, is a trade union for professional writers in the United Kingdom. It is affiliated with both the Trades Union Congress (TUC) and the International Affiliation of Writers Guilds (IAWG).

== History ==
The union was founded in 1959 as the Television and Screen Writers' Guild (commonly known as the Screen Writers' Guild), the successor to the Screenwriters' Association dating back to 1938. During the 1960s, it expanded to cover radio and book writers and adopted its present title in 1966. It sponsored the campaigns of the Writers' Action Group to establish the Public Lending Right and the Authors' Licensing and Collecting Society, which – starting from a single room in the Writers' Guild premises – has collected and distributed more than £100 million in payments to writers for photocopying and overseas retransmission of broadcasts. WGGB also hosts the annual Writers' Guild Awards.

In 1997, WGGB merged with the Theatre Writers Union, and membership now stands at around 2,600. Presidents, chairs and leading activists of WGGB have included: Lord (Ted) Willis, Jimmy Perry, Bryan Forbes, Denis Norden, Maureen Duffy, Alan Plater, Rosemary Anne Sisson, Wally K. Daly, Ian Curteis, J. C. Wilsher, David Nobbs, Anthony Read, Olivia Hetreed and David Edgar, the noted playwright, TV and film writer (Nicholas Nickleby for the Royal Shakespeare Company; Pentecost, which won an Evening Standard Award in 1994; The Jail Diary of Albie Sachs; Albert Speer, based on Gitta Sereny's biography of Hitler's architect; Playing With Fire; etc.). The current president is Sandi Toksvig OBE.

== Activities ==
WGGB represents writers working in television, radio, film, theatre, books and multimedia.

It negotiates a series of Minimum Terms Agreements (MTAs) governing writers' contracts and covering minimum fees, advances, repeat fees, royalties and residuals, rights, credits, number of drafts, script alterations and the resolution of disputes. The most important MTAs cover: BBC TV Drama; BBC Radio Drama; ITV Companies; PACT (independent TV and film producers); TAC (Welsh language independent TV producers); Theatrical Management Association; Independent Theatre Council; and an agreement covering the Royal National Theatre, Royal Shakespeare Company and Royal Court Theatre. These agreements are regularly renegotiated and in most cases the minimum fees are reviewed annually.

WGGB advises its members on all aspects of their working lives. This includes contract vetting, legal advice, help with copyright problems and representation in disputes with producers, publishers or other writers.

Regular events are organised for members. Examples include a Meet the Agents event in London, Television Writing: Women's Work? in Leeds, an exclusive Archers event in the West Midlands, plus screenings of new and upcoming film releases. The Annual General Meeting features an address by an industry professional/s, an opportunity to debate issues of importance to writers and amend WGGB's rules.

== Lobbying ==
WGGB is a campaigning union and effective lobbying efforts have concentrated on MEPs considering the European copyright directive, and MPs, peers and the media over the Communications Bill and the BBC Charter renewal. WGGB made strong protests when crowd violence halted performances of Behzti by Gurpreet Kaur Bhatti at the Birmingham repertory theatre in December 2004, and subsequently revived its Anti-Censorship Committee. WGGB makes a point of highlighting the importance of writing for children in all media.

It co-operates closely with other unions, including Equity, the Musicians' Union and the Society of Authors, and is affiliated to the British Copyright Council, Creators' Rights Alliance, Campaign for Press and Broadcasting Freedom and other pressure groups. WGGB representatives attend regular briefings with the Arts Council, Ofcom, the Public Lending Right agency and other national bodies. Recent campaigns include the Equality Writes campaign, tackling inequality in the screen industries.

== International affiliations ==
International connections include: International Affiliation of Writers Guilds (screenwriters guilds in the UK, US, Canada, Ireland, Australia, New Zealand, France and Mexico); European Writers Congress (more than 50 organisations); Fédération des Scénaristes d'Europe (screenwriters' groups in 14 countries); UNI-MEI (worldwide trade union organisation representing millions of workers in the TV, film, media and entertainment industries). WGGB has a reciprocal membership and services arrangement with the Irish Playwrights and Screenwriters Guild. UK WGGB members who achieve TV or film writing contracts in the US can join the Writers Guild of America without paying the usual $2,500 initial fee.

== Welfare ==
The Writers' Guild Pension Scheme provides personal pension plans customised for freelance writers who may need to make irregular and sometimes small pension contributions. The scheme is coupled with clauses in several Guild MTAs entitling members to pension contributions in addition to their writing fees.

Over the years, the Writers' Guild Welfare Fund has accumulated more than £40,000, which is available to provide loans or grants to members in financial difficulty.

== Membership ==
Full Membership is open to anyone who has received payment for a piece of written work under a contract with terms no less than those negotiated by WGGB. Writers who do not qualify can join as Candidate Members, or Student Members.

== Awards ==
The WGGB Awards were first given out in 1961. The WGGB also awards the Tinniswood Award for radio dramas, which are incorporated into the BBC Audio Drama Awards. An archive of all winners since 1961 is available on the WGGB website.

The Olwen Wymark Theatre Encouragement Awards, named in honour of playwright Olwen Wymark (1932–2013), were established in 2005 by Mark Ravenhill and David James, and are awarded annually. WGGB members are invited to make nominations "to publicly thank those who have given them a positive experience in new writing over the previous year."

== General Secretaries ==
1964: Alan Sapper
1967: Alan Griffiths
1970s: Elaine Steel
1979–1982: Ian Rowland-Hill
1980s: Walter Jeffrey
1990s: Alison Gray
2000: Bernie Corbett
2017: Ellie Peers
