= International Federation of Trade Unions of Audio-Visual Workers =

International trade union federation

- Federation internationale des syndicats des travailleurs de l'audiovisuel
- Merged into: Media and Entertainment International
- Founded: 1975
- Dissolved: 1993
- Headquarters: 1 rue Janssen, Paris
- Key people: Alan Sapper (President)

The International Federation of Trade Unions of Audio-Visual Workers (French: Federation internationale des syndicats des travailleurs de l'audiovisuel, FISTAV) was a global union federation bringing together unions representing film and television technicians and related workers.

== History ==
The federation was established in February 1975 at a conference in London, on the initiative of Alan Sapper and the British Association of Cinematograph, Television and Allied Technicians. It decided not to affiliate to either the International Confederation of Free Trade Unions (ICFTU) or the World Federation of Trade Unions. As such, it brought together social democratic, communist and non-aligned trade unions from around the world. This put it in competition with the ICFTU-aligned International Secretariat of Entertainment Trade Unions (ISETU).

By 1979, the federation had affiliates from Belgium, Bulgaria, Czechoslovakia, Denmark, East Germany, Finland, France, Hungary, Iceland, Ireland, Israel, Italy, Japan, the Netherlands, Norway, Poland, Romania, the Soviet Union, Sweden, the United Kingdom, and Yugoslavia.

FISTAV worked closely with the International Federation of Actors and International Federation of Musicians, and the three were sometimes termed the "FFF" secretariats. In 1991, the three agreed to work more closely with ISETU, forming the "International Committee of Entertainment and Media Unions".

In 1993, FISTAV merged with ISETU, to form what became known as the Media and Entertainment International. Sapper served as the federation's president throughout its existence, while its first general secretary was René Janelle, and its final general secretary was Annie Abramovicz.
