= 1951 Harrow West by-election =

UK Parliamentary by-election

The 1951 Harrow West by-election, was held on 21 April 1951 when the incumbent Conservative MP Norman Bower resigned. The seat was retained by the Conservative candidate Albert Braithwaite with a significantly increased majority and 72% of the votes cast.

Harrow West by-election, 1951
Party	Candidate	Votes	%	±%
Conservative	Albert Braithwaite	22,826	72.00	+13.46
Labour	Leslie Littlewood	8,877	28.00	−13.46
Majority		13,949	44.00	+14.97
Turnout		31,703	68.00	−18.70
Registered electors		46,599		
Conservative hold		Swing		
