= Lionel Elvin =

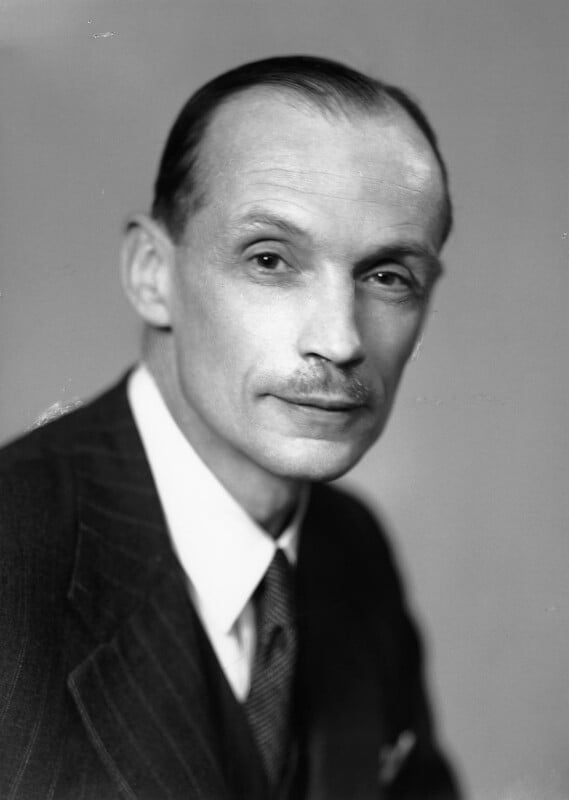
Elvin in 1950

Herbert Lionel Elvin (7 August 1905 in Buckhurst Hill – 14 June 2005 in Cambridge) was an educationist.

Elvin was the son of Herbert Henry Elvin, General Secretary of the National Union of Clerks, and brother of George, who became General Secretary of the Association of Cinematograph Television and Allied Technicians.

He studied at Southend High School for Boys, for which he wrote the lyrics for the school song, and Trinity Hall, Cambridge, where he achieved first class honours in English and History. He was also president of the Cambridge Union Society and, as an athlete, represented Cambridge in the half-mile against Oxford in 1927.

After a two-year Commonwealth Fund Fellowship at Yale, Elvin returned to Trinity Hall in 1930 as the college's first Fellow with responsibility for teaching English (he was tutor to both Marshall McLuhan and Raymond Williams while he was there). He became the Senior Treasurer of the then newly formed Cambridge University Labour Club in Easter Term 1934. That same year, he married Mona Bedortha Dutton (died 1997; one son, Mark).

His interest in education was broadened by membership of Cambridge Town Council and by the work of Henry Morris, chief education officer for Cambridgeshire, who was the creator of "village colleges" in the county. Elvin was also active in the Workers' Educational Association and served as treasurer of its Eastern District. Elvin was a man of the left, a radical and a "non-Christian"; his adherence to his principles led him to refuse numerous honours, although he did accept the honorary fellowships awarded to him by Trinity Hall and the Institute of Education. He was a "person of great charm and modesty" (his Who's Who entry included under recreations "most games indifferently"). He was also the first chairman of Amnesty International.

Elvin was active in several educational causes, including as president of the English New Education Fellowship, president of the Council for Education in World Citizenship and chairperson of the Commonwealth Education Liaison Committee.

He was also:

- Fellow, Trinity Hall, Cambridge 1930-1944, Honorary Fellow 1980
- 1944-1950 Principal of Ruskin College, Oxford
- 1950-1956 Director of Department of Education at Unesco in Paris
- Professor of Education in Tropical Areas, Institute of Education, London University 1956-58
- 1958-1973 when he retired: Director of the Institute of Education at London University
- Emeritus Professor of Education 1973-2005, Honorary Fellow 1993

His Second World War service was in the Air Ministry and in the American Division of the Ministry of Information, but in 1944 he moved to a different environment with his appointment as principal of Ruskin College, Oxford. His chief rival for the post was Richard Crossman. In his autobiography, Encounters with Education (1987), Elvin, who had stood unsuccessfully as the Labour parliamentary candidate for Cambridge University in the election of 1935, recorded, "I do not think any five years in my career were more enjoyable than those I spent in Ruskin".

Elvin visited the United States on several occasions, but his final years were spent at his home in Bulstrode Gardens, Cambridge.

== Publications ==
- 1941: Men of America
- 1949: An Introduction to the Study of Literature
- 1965: Education and Contemporary Society
- 1977: The Place of Commonsense in Educational Thought
