= Roger Poole =

British trade union official and mediator

- Born: 11 July 1946; Bristol, England
- Died: 3 July 2015 (aged 68); Droitwich, England
- Occupations: Trade union official, mediator
- Spouse: Bernice Peglar
- Children: One son and one daughter

Roger Poole (11 July 1946 – 3 July 2015) was a British trade union official and mediator. After a variety of early jobs he worked for the National Union of Public Employees (NUPE), including during the disputes of the 1978-9 Winter of Discontent. Poole represented five unions during the 1989–90 British ambulance strike and won a 16.9% pay settlement, a rare victory in the Thatcher era. He afterwards negotiated a merger with the National and Local Government Officers' Association and the Confederation of Health Service Employees to form Unison, for which he served as assistant general secretary. After retirement from the unions Poole served on the Northern Ireland Parades Commission and mediated in industrial disputes. He was also a visiting lecturer at Warwick University.

== Early life ==
Roger Poole was born in Bristol on 11 July 1946 to Lillian and Samuel Poole; his father was a decorator and trade unionist. Poole attended the Ashton Gate Comprehensive School in Bristol, one of the first comprehensive schools in the country. While there he led a successful protest that saw the creation of the first football pitch at a school which had previously only played rugby. Poole left the school at the age of 15 with no qualifications and found work at a laboratory, as a motor mechanic and as a security guard at the Avonmouth Docks. Poole married Bernice Peglar in 1970 and the couple spent their honeymoon promoting British goods by travelling across the United States and South America on a double-decker bus, funded by a Confederation of British Industry grant; the trip ended when the bus sank in a river in Peru.

== Union official ==
Upon his return to the United Kingdom Poole became an official for the National Union of Public Employees (NUPE), a trade union with members drawn largely from manual workers in the health service and local government. Poole became an assistant general secretary of the union which was embroiled in industrial disputes during the 1978-9 Winter of Discontent. The union action was unpopular and the Labour government was defeated at the 1979 general election by Margaret Thatcher's Conservatives.

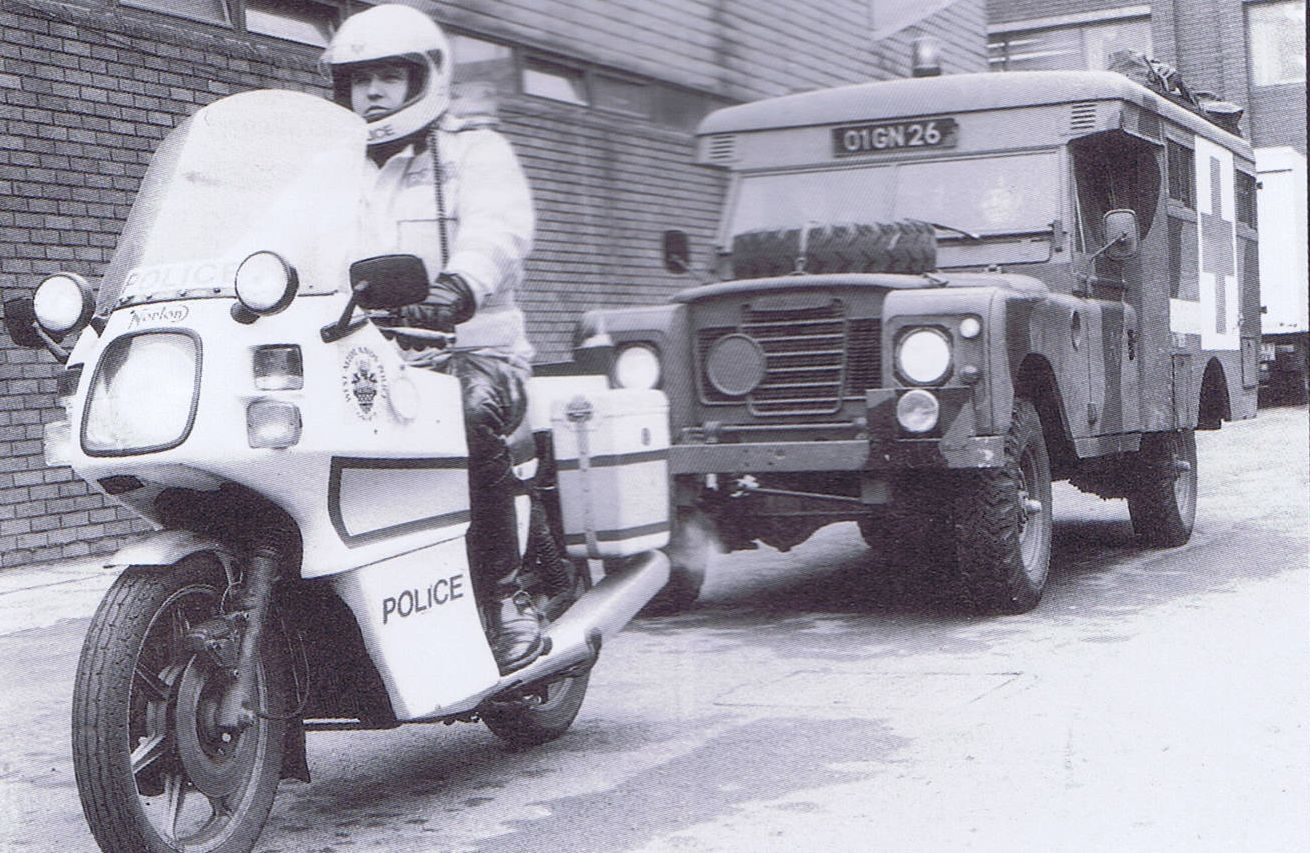
An army ambulance on call during the 1989–90 ambulance strike

Poole learned from the experience and brought a different approach when he was appointed spokesman and chief negotiator for five unions during the 1989–90 British ambulance strike over pay for ambulance crews. Poole got a new haircut and bought a new suit for the negotiations. His "moderate, confident, bright and committed" demeanour at negotiations and press conferences brought public support behind the strike. The government response, under Health Secretary Kenneth Clarke, was, by contrast, divided and contradictory. Poole was able to secure a 16.9% pay rise for his members, a settlement that Poole claimed had driven "a coach and horses through the government’s pay policy". The settlement was a rare success for the unions in the Thatcher era and Poole, later described by The Independent as "a hero of the trade union movement", was runner-up in that year's Today programme's man of the year award.

Poole helped to negotiate the 1993 merger of NUPE with the National and Local Government Officers' Association and the Confederation of Health Service Employees to form Unison and served as an assistant general secretary of the new union. In 1996 he won a court case on behalf a local government employee who had suffered several breakdowns during her employment. He warned employers that the result meant they had a responsibility to look after the mental wellbeing of their staff.

== Later career ==
After his retirement from Unison Poole was appointed by Peter Hain to the Parades Commission, a public body with responsibility for monitoring parades in Northern Ireland, in 2005. This role required careful negotiation and mediation between different parading groups, many of whom were sectarian in nature. Poole failed to secure the co-operation of the Orange Order but nevertheless parades during his tenure on the commission, lasting until 2009, were more peaceful than those in other times.

Poole afterwards worked as a mediator in industrial disputes including the 2007 Remploy factory closures and the 2009 Royal Mail dispute. He also adjudicated during an internal Associated Society of Locomotive Engineers and Firemen dispute which had flared up into a brawl among its leaders at a union barbeque. Poole also worked as a visiting lecturer at Warwick University.

== Personal life ==
Roger and Bernice Poole had one son, Jason, and a daughter, Jessica. He was a lifelong follower of the football club, Bristol Rovers. Poole died on 3 July 2015 in Droitwich, of colon cancer.
