= International Secretariat of Entertainment Trade Unions =

Former global union federation (1965–1993)

The International Secretariat of Entertainment Trade Unions (ISETU) was a global union federation bringing together trade unions representing workers in the arts, media and entertainment industries.

== History ==
The secretariat was established in 1965, on the initiative of the International Confederation of Free Trade Unions. It absorbed the International Congress of Broadcasting Unions, and adopted two existing bodies, the European Union of Film and Television Workers, and the Inter-American Federation of Entertainment Workers, as regional bodies.

The first general secretary, Alan Forrest, believed that the funding for the new organisation came from the American government, and was intended to provide a less radical alternative to the International Federation of Actors (FIA) and International Federation of Musicians (FIM). These allegations were never proven, but influenced the perception of the organisation among many trade unionists, and it did not attract affiliations from any unions which held membership of the FIA or FIM.

ISETU was initially based in Brussels, but later moved its headquarters to London, and then on to Vienna, and finally Geneva. In 1984, it affiliated to the International Federation of Commercial, Clerical, Professional and Technical Employees (FIET) and became known as the International Secretariat for Arts, Mass Media and Entertainment Trade Unions (ISETU-FIET), but retained a high level of autonomy.

At the start of 1992, the federation left FIET, and instead established the International Committee of Entertainment and Media Unions with the FIA, FIM, International Federation of Audio Visual Workers (FISTAV) and the International Federation of Journalists, the International Graphical Federation soon also joining. Relationships with FISTAV were particularly strong, and in 1993, the two secretariats merged, forming what became known as the Media and Entertainment International.

== Affiliates ==
In 1979, the following unions were affiliated to the federation:

Union	Country
Sociedad Argentina de Locutores	Argentina
Syndicato Unico Trabajadores Espectaculo Publico de la Republic Argentina	Argentina
Australian Theatrical and Amusement Workers' Association	Australia
Australian Broadcasting Commission Staff Association	Australia
Professional Musicians' Union of Australia	Australia
Union of Artists, Media Workers and Freelance Workers	Austria
Bahamas Musicians' and Entertainers' Union	Bahamas
Comité National des Travailleurs du Film et de la Télévision	Belgium
Centrale Générale des Services Publics	Belgium
Federacion Sindical de Trabajadores en Radiodifusion de Bolivia	Bolivia
Sindicato Nacional de Trabajadores de la Radio	Colombia
Cyprus Broadcasting Corporation Staff Society	Cyprus
Sindicato General de Trabajadores de Radio y Televisión de la Provincia del Guyayas	Ecuador
Syndicat Français du Cinéma de la Radio et la Télévision	France
Fédération Syndicaliste des Spectacles	France
Fédération Nationale de l'Education Spectacles	France
Gewerkschaft öffentliche Dienst	West Germany
Rundfund - Fernseh - Film - Union	West Germany
Internationale Artistenloge	West Germany
Genossenschaft Deutscher Buehnenangehoeriger	West Germany
Association of Broadcasting Staff	United Kingdom
National Association of Theatrical, Television and Ciné Employees	United Kingdom
Indian Motion Picture Employees' Union	India
Irish Transport and General Workers' Union	Ireland
National Union of Ciné and Television Technicians	Israel
Federazione Unitaria Lavoratori della Spettacolo	Italy
Unione Nazionale Autori e Cinetecnici	Italy
Unione Italiana Lavoratori dello Spettacolo	Italy
Nichionro	Japan
Musicians' Labour Union	Japan
Kenya National Union of Musicians	Kenya
Mauritius National Labour Film Institute Acting Board	Mauritius
Sindicato de Trabajadores de la Radiofusion Television	Mexico
Sindicato de Trabajadores de la Industria Cinematorgrafica	Mexico
Sindicato Nacional de Trabajadores de la Musica de la Republic Mexicana	Mexico
Algemene Nederlandse Organisatie van Uitvoevende Kunstenaars	Netherlands
Algemene Bond Mercurius	Netherlands
New Zealand Musicians' Union	New Zealand
Association of Nigerian Musicians	Nigeria
Association of Radio and TV Journalists of Nigeria	Nigeria
Associación de Locutores y Operadores de Radio y Televisión del Paraguay	Paraguay
Sindicato Nacional de Trabajadores Especializados de la Industria de Radio y Television del Peru	Peru
Sociedad Peruana de Actores	Peru
Philippine Musicians' Guild	Philippines
Musicians' Union of Singapore	Singapore
Svenska Industritjanstemannaforbundet	Sweden
Association des Employés de la Télévision Suisse	Switzerland
Screen Actors' Guild	United States
American Federation of Television and Radio Artists	United States
American Guild of Musical Artists	United States
International Alliance of Theatrical Stage Employees and Moving Picture Machine Operators	United States
International Brotherhood of Electrical Workers	United States
American Federation of Musicians	United States
Associacion Musical del Distrito Federal y Estado Miranda	Venezuela

== Leadership ==
=== General Secretaries ===
1965: Alan Forrest
1972: Post vacant
1984: Irene Robadey
1991: Jim Wilson

=== Presidents ===
1965: Leslie Littlewood
1971: Robin Richardson
1976: Josef Schweinzer
1984: Walter Bacher
