= George Elvin =

British trade union leader

George Herbert Elvin (1907 – 3 February 1984) was a British trade union leader.

The son of Herbert Henry Elvin, general secretary of the National Union of Clerks, and brother of Lionel Elvin, who became a prominent educationalist, George devoted his youth to political activism. In 1930, he became the first secretary of the National Workers' Sports Association. This organisation, set up by the Labour Party and Trades Union Congress, was a rival to the communist-led British Workers' Sports Federation and principally organised international competition for workers' sports teams, including sending teams to the International Workers' Olympiads. Through this, Elvin was a leading opponent of holding the 1936 Olympic Games in Berlin.

In 1934, Lionel suggested to George that he become involved in the Association of Cine-Technicians. This had been founded the previous year but was struggling; it had only 88 members, few of whom had paid subscriptions, and was in financial difficulties. Elvin was appointed as its general secretary and immediately established a union journal, and an employment exchange to help members find work. This enabled him to recruit many more members; within a year of his appointment, the union had more than 600 members and its finances were sound.

On the outbreak of World War II, the British Government decided that film production should halt. Elvin successfully argued that it should continue in order to boost morale. After the war, he led in the union in campaigning for the establishment of the National Film School and the National Film Finance Corporation. The union expanded its remit, becoming the "Association of Cinematograph, Television and Allied Technicians", and by 1969, membership was more than 16,000. Its prominence was such that, when the Federation of Entertainment Unions was established in 1968, Elvin was appointed as its first secretary.

Elvin was also active in the Labour Party. He stood unsuccessfully for the party in Weston-super-Mare at the 1935 United Kingdom general election, Kingston-upon-Thames in 1945, and Oxford in the 1951 and 1955. He did succeed in gaining election as a councillor in Southend-on-Sea.

Elvin stood down as general secretary of the union in 1969, becoming its president until his final retirement in 1974. He remained on Southend council for many years, and was leader of the Labour group there as late as 1982.

Trade union offices
Preceded by New position	General Secretary of the Association of Cinematograph Technicians; 1934–1969	Succeeded by Alan Sapper
Preceded by New position	General Secretary of the Federation of Entertainment Unions; 1968–1970	Succeeded by Alan Sapper
Preceded by Anthony Asquith	President of the Association of Cinematograph, Television and Allied Technicians; 1969–1974	Succeeded by Robert Bolt
