= Rex Barber (cartoonist) =

Australian cartoonist

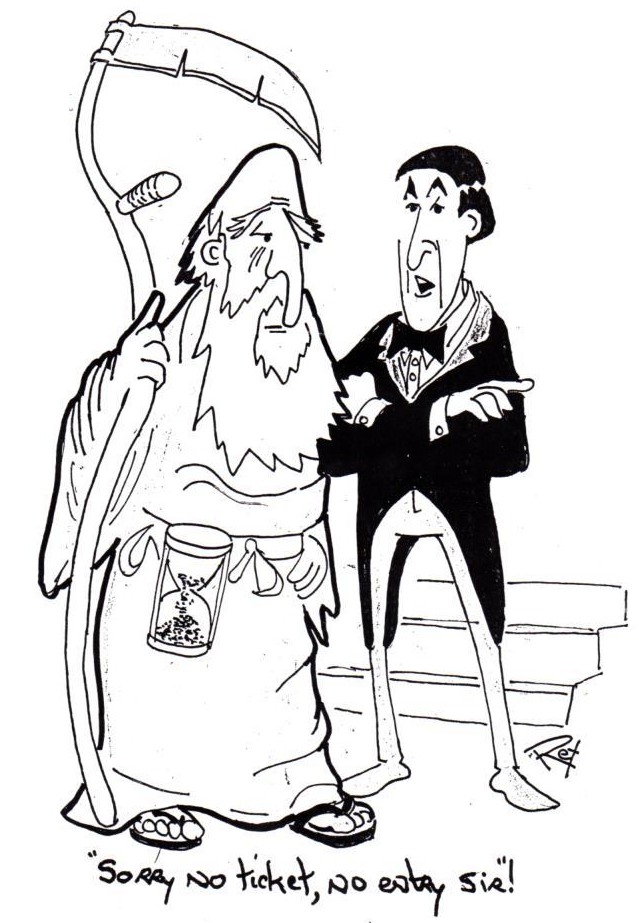
A cartoon by Australian cartoonist Rex Barber, prepared for the 1993 New Year Ball for embassies in Hanoi.

Rex Barber (born 1943) is an Australian cartoonist active since the 1960s.

== Cartooning career ==
His earliest published cartoons were in The Local Scene, a youth magazine first published in Perth, Western Australia on 16 June 1967. Barber contributed all art work and cartooning for The Local Scene, including creating the cartoon group "Pete Primitive and his Prehistoric’s", which lampooned four-member rock bands of the time, such as The Beatles and The Rolling Stones. Other cartoons were political in nature, given the prevailing political climate surrounding compulsory national service in Australia during the Vietnam War.

Following his work with The Local Scene, Barber continued drawing cartoons for several international magazines, in more recent years to do with antique collecting, metal detecting, and bottle collecting.

During the early 1990s, Barber worked in Vietnam with two silk screening shops in Hanoi that produced t-shirts bearing his work. One key design was a political one prepared for nurses in Western Australia undertaking industrial action. In Vietnam, he designed a menu and tickets for the 1993 New Year Ball thrown for embassies in Hanoi.

In 1993, Barber registered the business name Rex Cartoons and provided freelance cartooning services for corporate clients. In more recent years, his cartooning work has been focused on creating designs for 1000-piece jigsaw puzzles which are marketed as "Puzzling Puzzles".

== Gallery ==
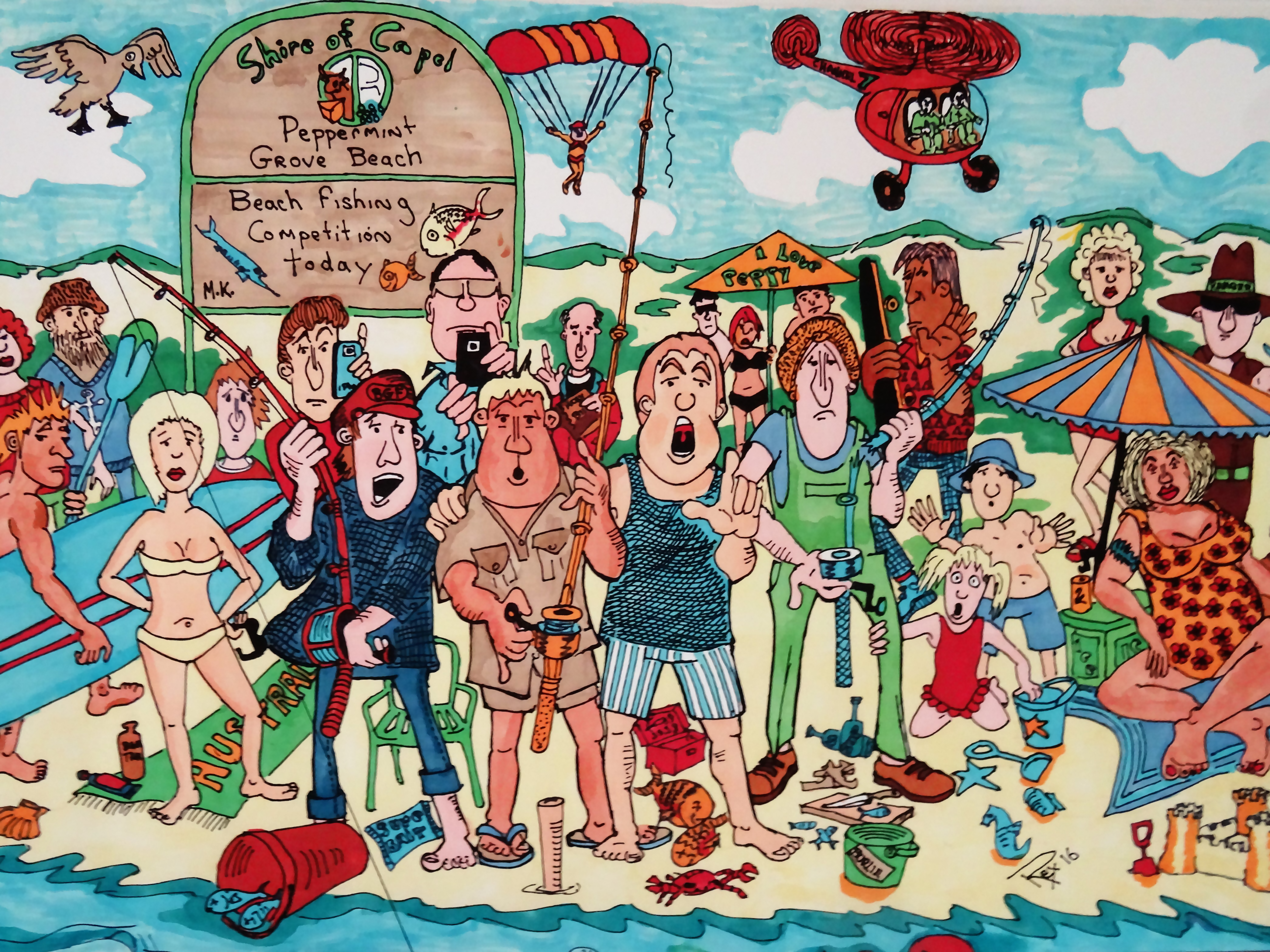

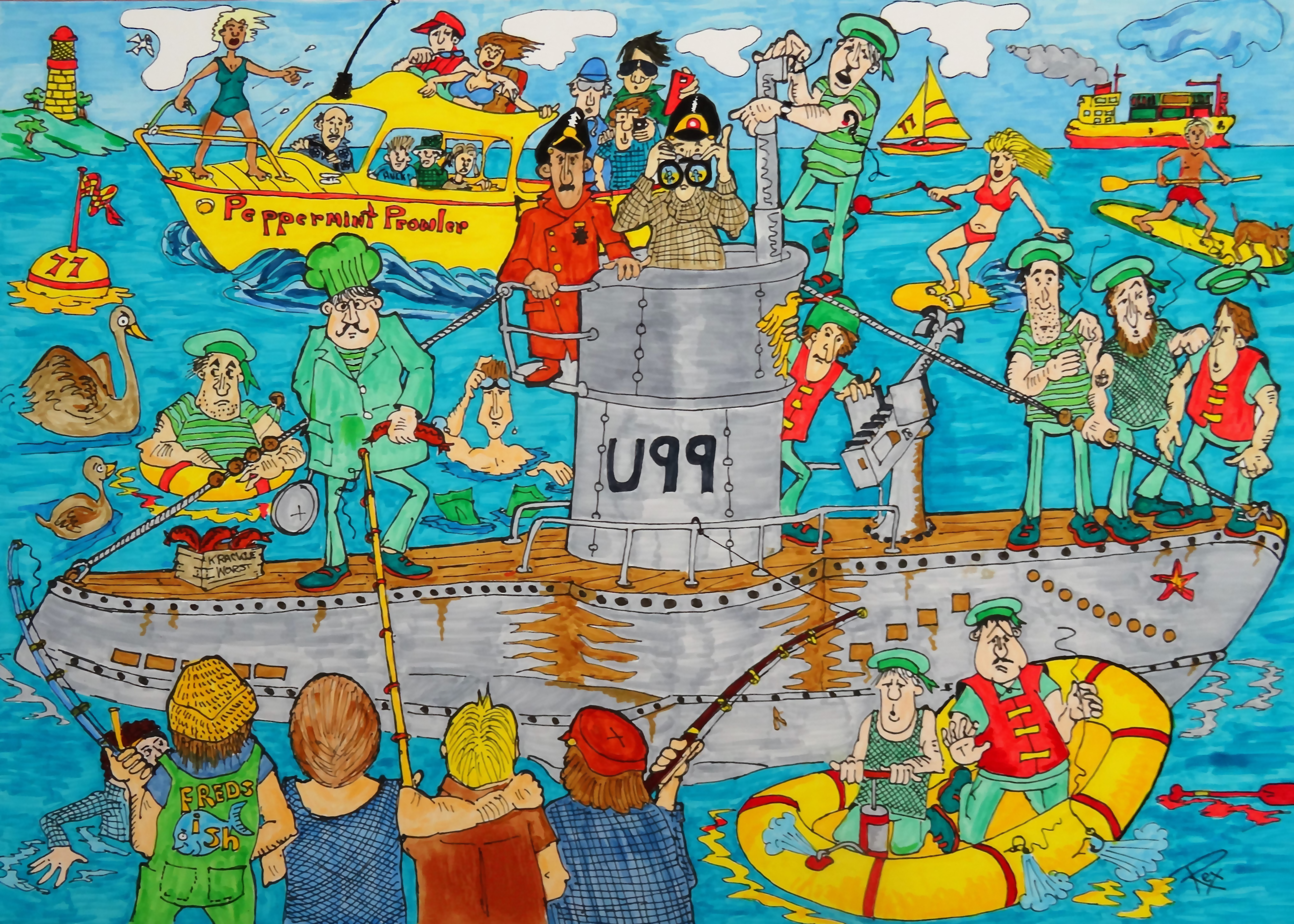

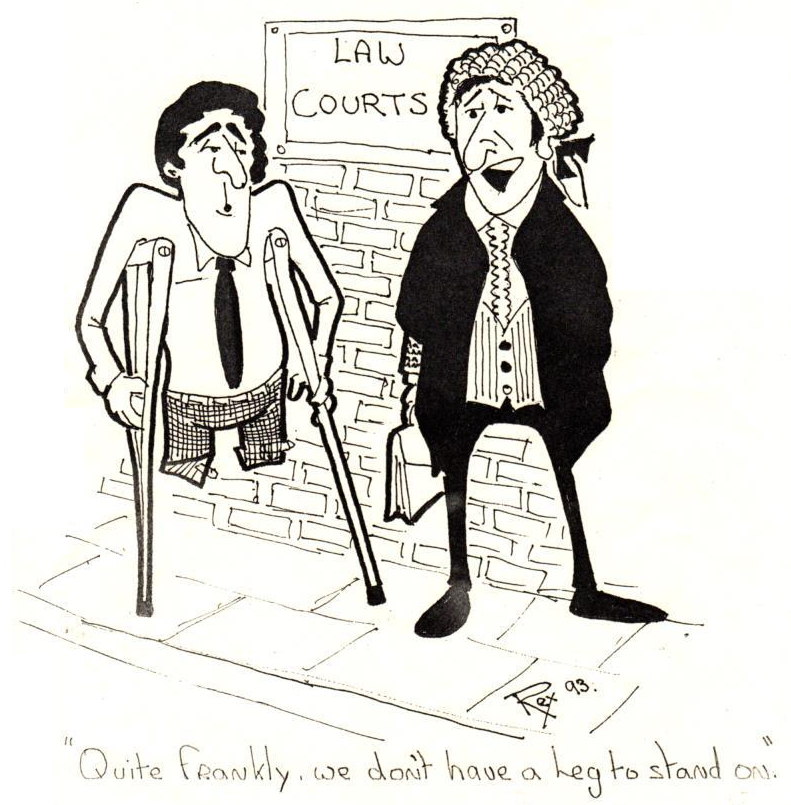

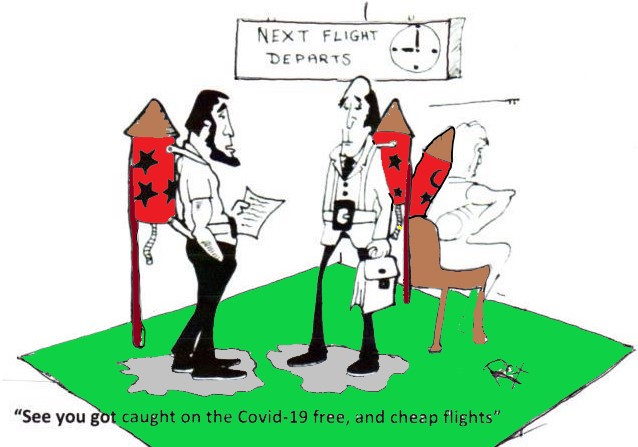

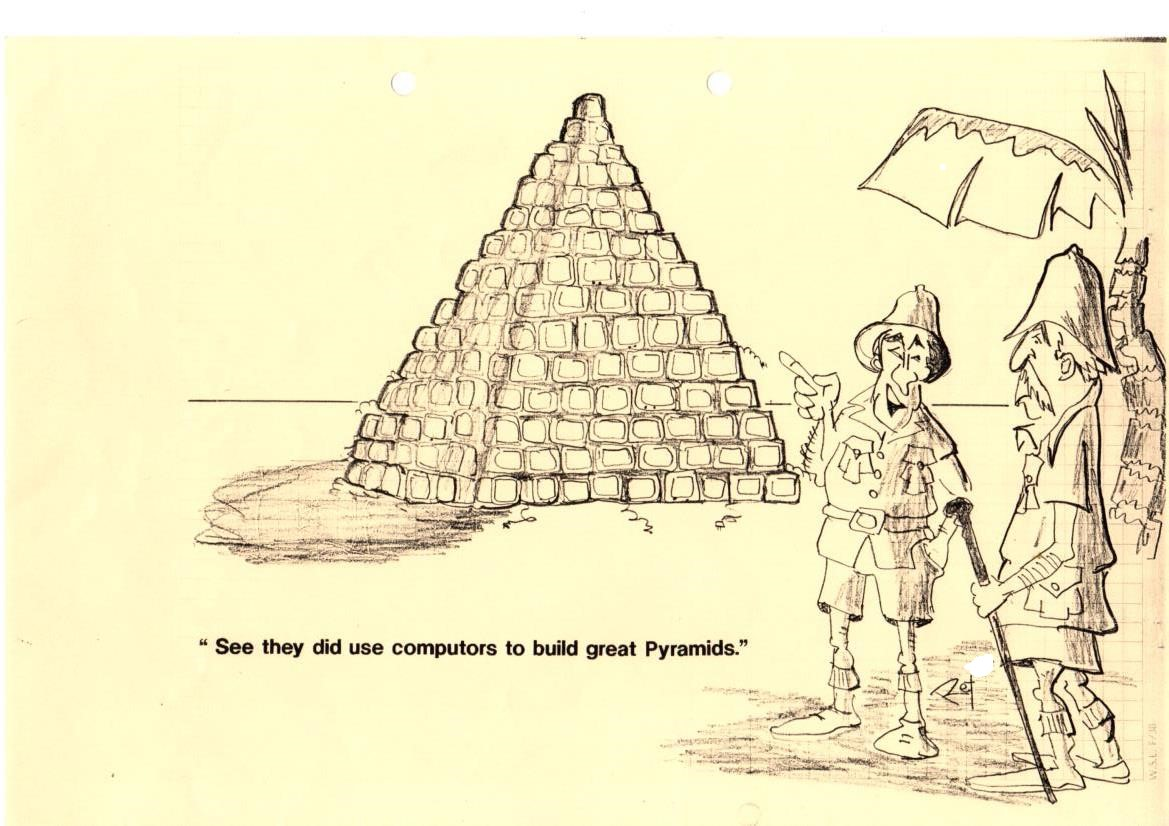

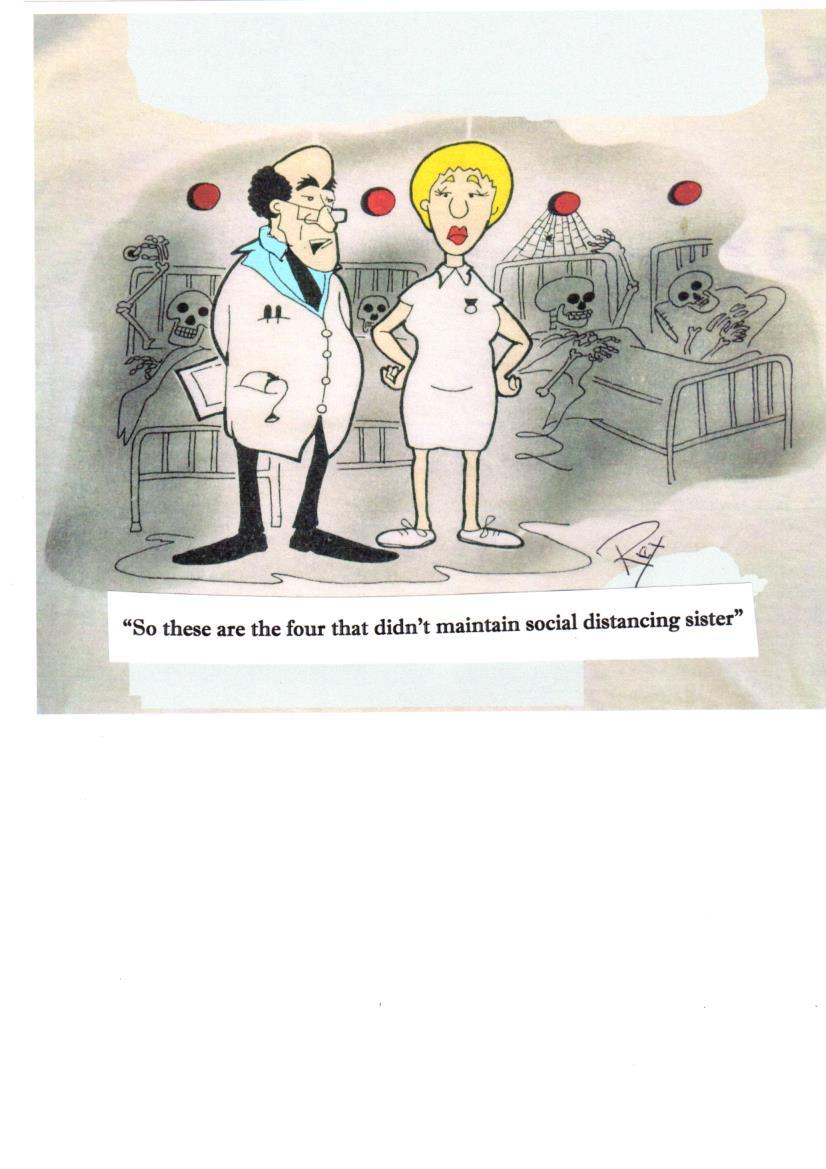

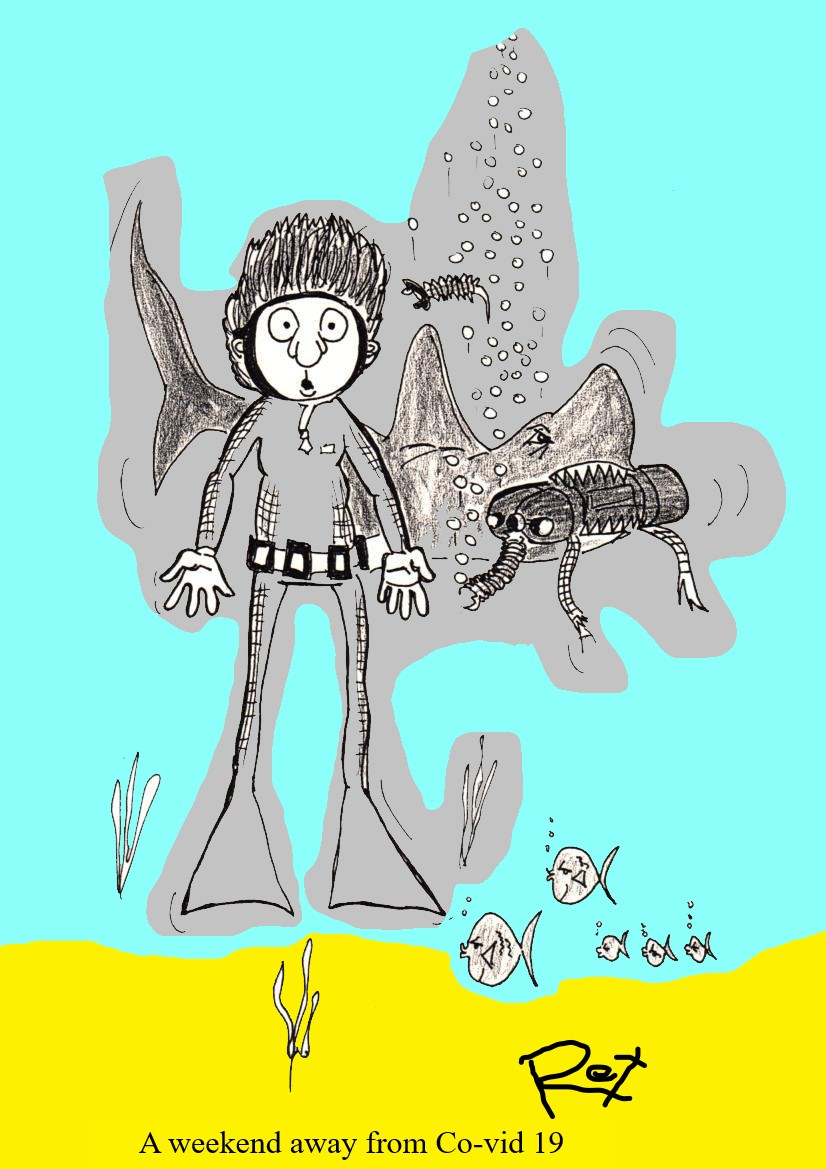

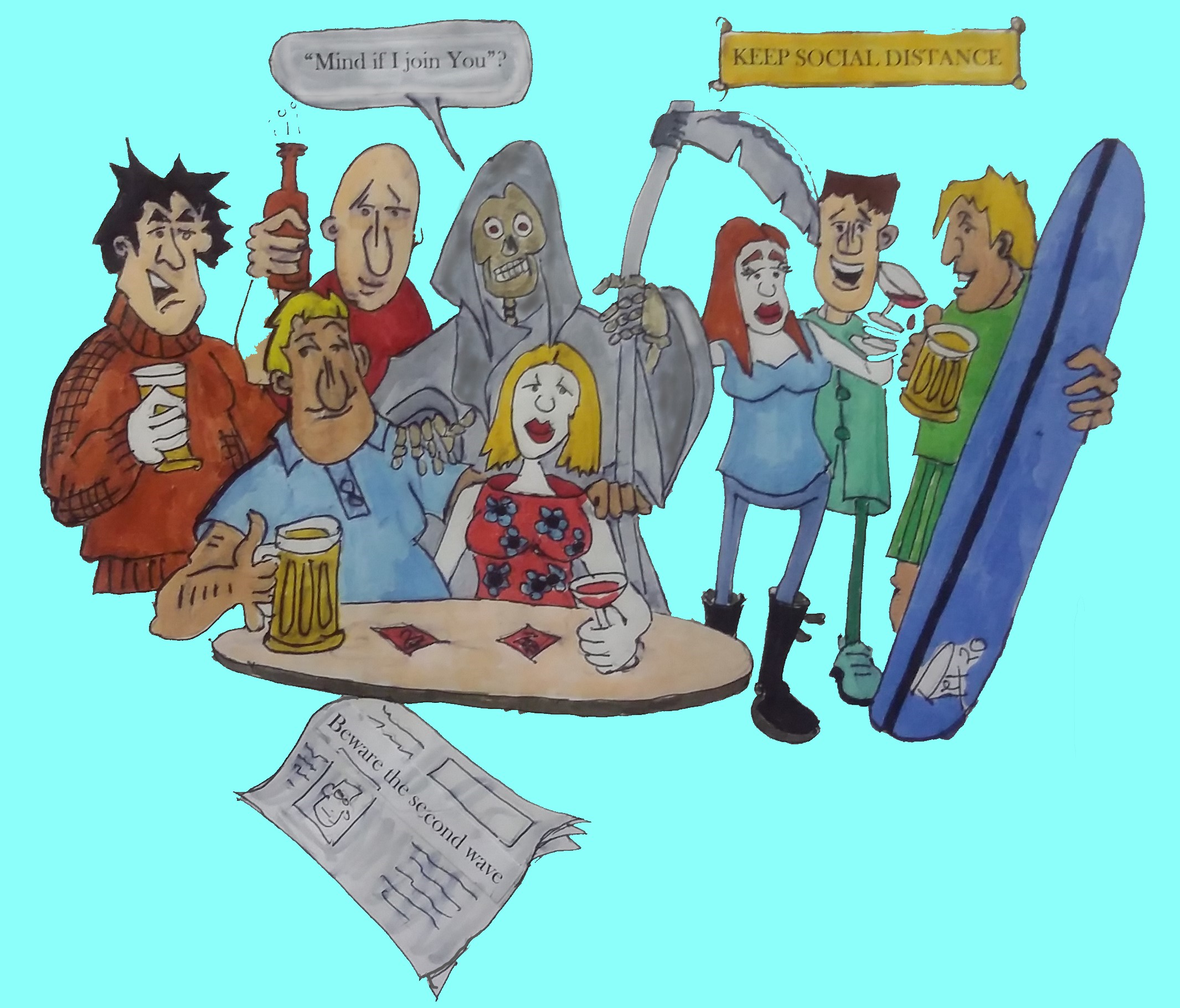

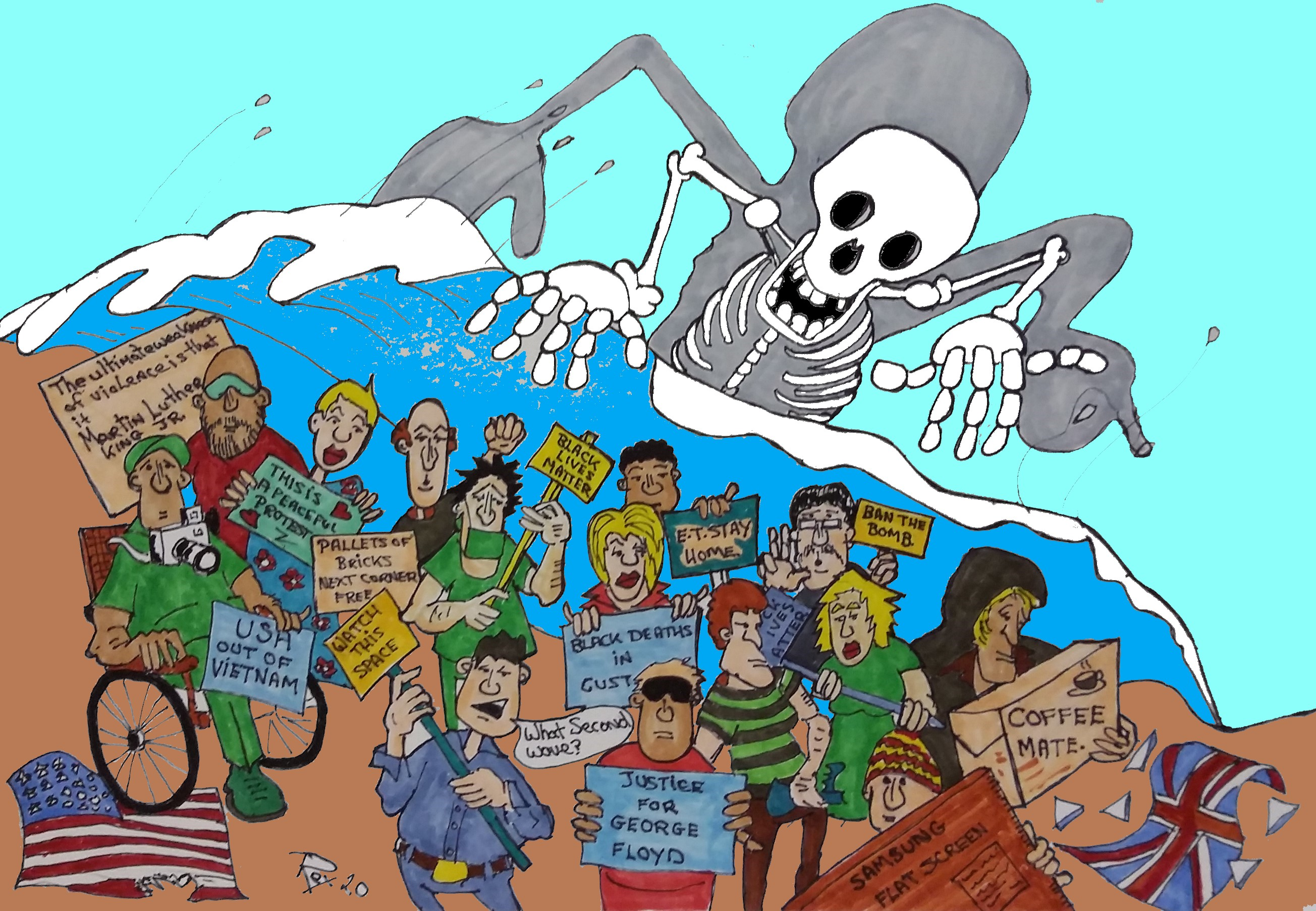

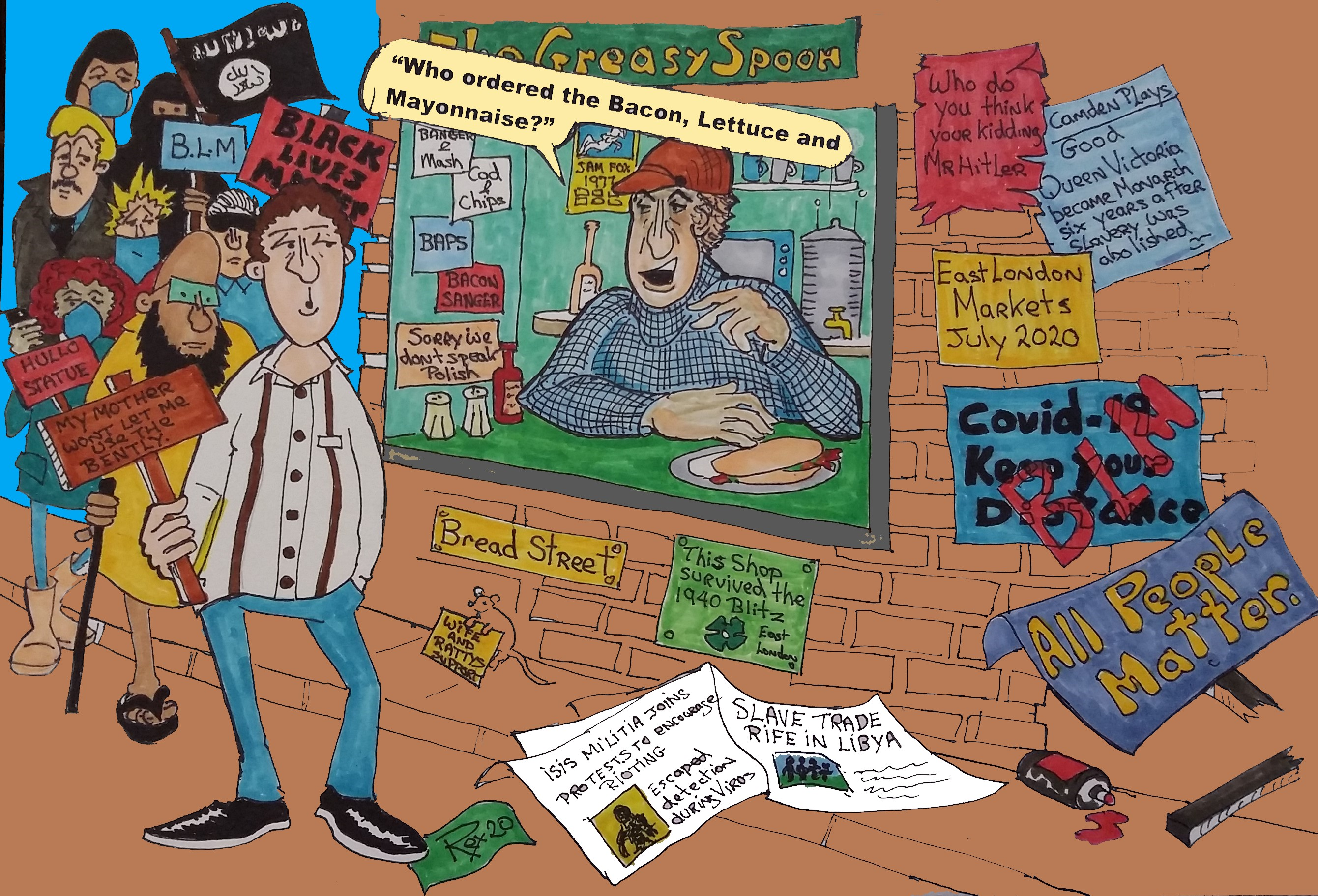

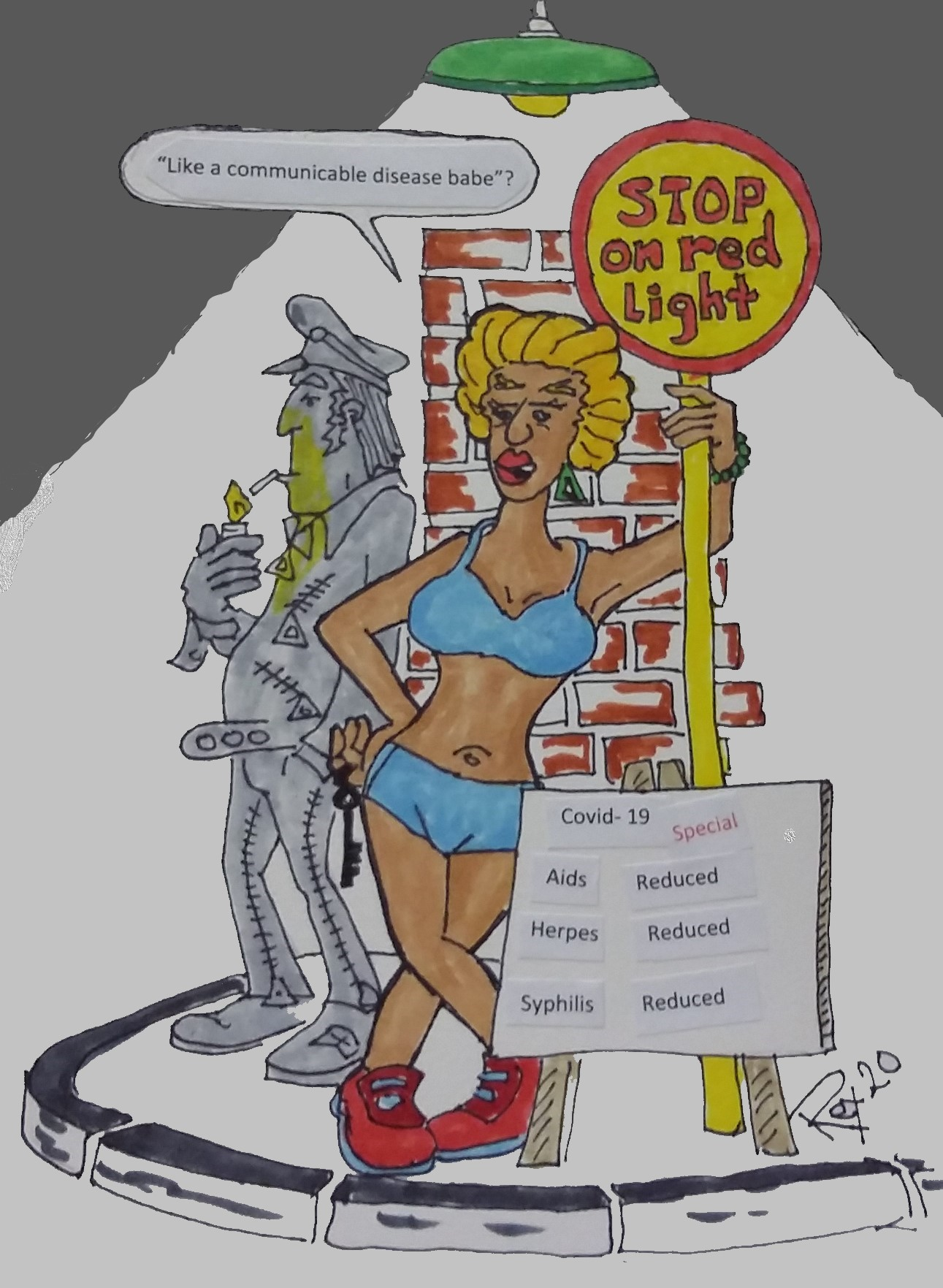
