= Leslie Littlewood =

British trade union leader and political activist

Thomas Leslie Littlewood (1906 – 22 December 1989) was a British trade union leader and political activist.

Littlewood grew up in Kingston-upon-Hull and won a bursary to Hull Grammar School, although he had to leave at the age of fifteen to support his family. He became active in the trade union movement, while also serving on the Education Committee of Hull City Council and volunteering for the Workers' Educational Association. He won a bursary to the University of London, completing a part-time degree in economics.

Littlewood decided to pursue a career as a full-time trade union official, and was selected from more than 400 applicants for the post of Deputy General Secretary of the Post Office Engineering Union. In 1946, he was selected as the new General Secretary of the BBC Staff Association. He took the association on an independent course, enabling it to register as an independent trade union under the name Association of Broadcasting Staff (ABS) in 1956, and took it into the Trades Union Congress (TUC) in 1963.

Littlewood was also active in the Labour Party, and he stood in Harrow West at the 1950 United Kingdom general election, taking 29.5% of the vote and second place. He stood again at the 1951 Harrow West by-election, and in the 1951 United Kingdom general election, each time achieving a similar result.

In 1968, Littlewood stood down as general secretary and instead become President of the ABS. That year, he was also elected to the General Council of the TUC, serving until his retirement in 1971.

Trade union offices
Preceded by Tom Hobson	General Secretary of the Association of Broadcasting Staff; 1946–1968	Succeeded by Tom Rhys
Preceded by New position	President of the International Secretariat of Entertainment Trade Unions; 1965–1971	Succeeded by Robin Richardson
Preceded by Tom O'Brien	Non-manual Workers representative on the General Council of the Trades Union Congress; 1968–1970; With: Tom O'Brien	Succeeded by Tom O'Brien and Alan Sapper
