= UNI Global Union =

Global union federation in Switzerland

UNI global union
- Union Network International global union
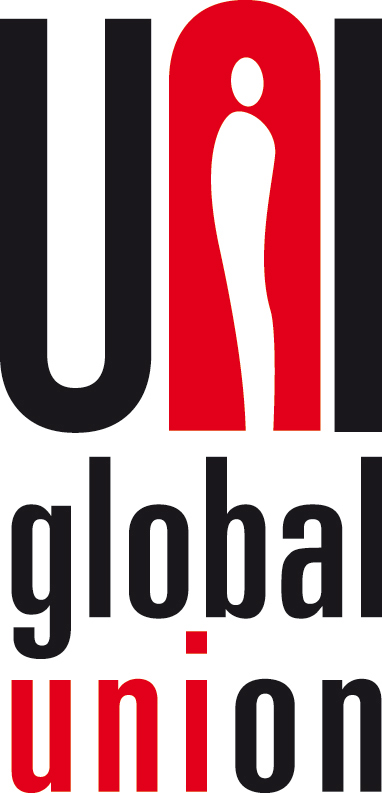
- Founded: January 1, 2000
- Headquarters: Nyon, Switzerland
- Location: International
- Members: 20 million
- Key people: Gerard Dwyer, President; Christy Hoffman, General Secretary
- Website: www.uniglobalunion.org

UNI Global Union, formally Union Network International (UNI), is a global union federation for the skills and services sectors, uniting national and regional trade unions. It has affiliated unions in 150 countries representing 20 million workers. The Global headquarters is in Nyon, Switzerland. As of 2021, UNI Global Union had ratified over 50 Global Framework Agreements with multinational corporations, including ABN AMRO, Carrefour, H&M, DHL, Telefonica, BNP Orange and Banco de Brazil, Inditex Group, and Kimberly Clark among others.

== History ==
UNI was the result of the merger of four global union federations: International Federation of Commercial, Clerical, Professional and Technical Employees (FIET), Media and Entertainment International (MEI), International Graphical Federation (IGF), and Communications International (CI). They merged on 1 January 2000, to form Union Network International. On 2 March 2009, the federation changed its name to UNI Global Union.

== International Federation of Commercial, Clerical, Professional and Technical Employees (FIET) ==
The first attempt to create an international federation of clerical workers was the International Commercial Employees' Secretariat, founded in Hamburg in 1909 and led by Edo Fimmen. This organization collapsed at the start of World War I, leading to the establishment of FIET in 1921 in Vienna. Initially, FIET represented only European unions, but after World War II, it began admitting unions from around the world. By 1994, FIET's membership had reached 11 million. FIET predominantly represented workers in banking, insurance, and clerical staff in commerce and social services. In 1984, the International Secretariat of Entertainment Trade Unions became an autonomous section of FIET.

== Media and Entertainment International (MEI) ==
MEI was a global union federation representing workers in the arts, established in 1993 through the merger of the International Secretariat of Arts, Communications, Media and Entertainment Trade Unions and the International Federation of Trade Unions of Audio-Visual Workers. Initially named the International Secretariat for Arts, Mass Media, and Entertainment Trade Unions (ISAMMETU), it was renamed MEI in 1995. MEI campaigned for public service broadcasting and minimum working conditions for freelance film and theatre workers. On 1 January 2000, MEI merged with FIET, IGF, and CI to form Union Network International.

== International Graphical Federation (IGF) ==
The IGF was a global union federation for printing workers. Efforts to establish this federation began in 1939, but it was officially founded in 1949 in Stockholm after World War II delayed its formation. The IGF focused on technical developments in the industry and sharing information on industrial disputes and employment standards. The federation operated on a non-political basis and had three boards covering typography, lithography, and bookbinding. By the end of 1999, the IGF merged with FIET, CI, and MEI to form Union Network International.

== Communications International (CI) ==
The Postal, Telegraph and Telephone International (PTTI) was the precursor to Communications International (CI). Founded in 1920 in Milan, it initially consisted of European unions but expanded globally after World War II. By 1994, it had four million members from various continents. Recognizing the importance of new forms of communication, the federation renamed itself as Communications International in 1997. At the end of 1999, CI merged with FIET, IGF, and MEI to form Union Network International.

== Global Agreements ==
=== Societe Generale Agreement ===
In 2023, UNI Global Union renewed its global agreement with Societe Generale. This new three-year agreement, building on previous accords from 2015 and 2019, includes enhanced commitments to combat discrimination, foster a safe working environment, and uphold workers' rights to freedom of association. The agreement covers 147,000 employees across 67 countries, emphasizing the bank's dedication to human rights and social dialogue.

== Campaigns and Labor Actions ==
=== Right to Disconnect Campaign ===
UNI Global Union has launched a global campaign to help workers reclaim their right to disconnect from their jobs. This campaign, supported by detailed guidelines for negotiating disconnection terms, aims to combat the anxiety, depression, and burnout associated with constant connectivity. Agreements have already been secured with major companies like Telefonica and Orange.

=== IKEA Group Dispute ===
In July 2023, the Dutch National Contact Point published the final statement on the dispute between UNI Global Union and IKEA Group. The dispute centered on workers' freedom of association in IKEA’s operations in Ireland, Portugal, and the USA. The process facilitated by the NCP led to agreements in Portugal but not yet in the USA or Ireland. The final statement included recommendations for improving labor relations and ensuring the right to organize.

== Leadership ==
=== General secretaries ===
2000: Philip Jennings
2018: Christy Hoffman

=== Presidents ===
2000: Kurt van Haaren
2001: Maj-Len Remahl
2003: Joseph T. Hansen
2010: Joe de Bruyn
2014: Ann Selin
2018: Ruben Cortina
2023: Gerard Dwyer
