= National Association of Theatrical Television and Kine Employees =

Former trade union of the United Kingdom

- National Association of Theatrical Television and Kine Employees
- Merged into: Broadcasting and Entertainment Trades Alliance
- Founded: 1890
- Dissolved: 1984
- Headquarters: 155 Kennington Park Road, London
- Location: United Kingdom
- Members: 19,000 (1982)
- Publication: NATTKE Newsletter
- Affiliations: Trades Union Congress

The National Association of Theatrical Television and Kine Employees (NATTKE) was a trade union in the United Kingdom which existed between 1890 and 1984. It represented employees who worked in theatres, cinemas and television.

== History ==
The union was founded in the aftermath of a strike at the Adelphi Theatre in London in 1890 as the United Kingdom Theatrical and Music Hall Operatives' Union. By the turn of the century, it had become a national organisation, and in 1901, it renamed itself the National Union of Theatrical Stage Employees. In 1902, it became affiliated with the Trades Union Congress.

In 1904, the union began recruiting workers in cinemas, and renamed itself the National Association of Theatrical Employees, not crediting its cinema staff in the union name until 1936, when it became the National Association of Theatrical and Kine Employees. In 1932, Tom O'Brien was elected General Secretary, a post he was to hold until 1970 – including fourteen years during which he was a Labour Party Member of Parliament.

The union began organising some television workers, and in 1970, it changed its name under its then General Secretary Robert Keenan to reflect this as NATTKE (the National Association of Theatrical, Television and Kine Employees). It began organising among bingo hall staff, and in 1983 it merged with the National Association of Executives Managers and Staffs.

In 1984, the NATTKE merged with the Association of Broadcasting and Allied Staffs to form the Broadcasting and Entertainment Trades Alliance.

The merged union created by NATTKE and the ABS was briefly known as ETA before becoming BETA.

== General Secretaries ==
c.1890: T. Elvidge
c.1900: William Johnson
1923: Hugh Roberts
1932: Tom O'Brien
1970: Robert Keenan
1975: John Wilson
