= Media and Entertainment International =

Former global union federation (1993–1999)

- Merged into: Union Network International
- Founded: 3–4 December 1993
- Dissolved: 31 December 1999
- Key people: Jim Wilson, Gen Sec
- Affiliations: ICFTU

The Media and Entertainment International (MEI) was a global union federation representing workers in the arts.

The federation was founded in 1993 with the merger of the International Secretariat of Arts, Communications, Media and Entertainment Trade Unions and the International Federation of Trade Unions of Audio-Visual Workers. Originally named the International Secretariat for Arts, Mass Media and Entertainment Trade Unions (ISAMMETU), in 1995 it renamed itself as the "Media and Entertainment International".

The federation campaigned in support of public service broadcasting, and in support of minimum working conditions for freelance film and theatre workers. The federation failed to agree a common policy on whether governments should mandate that a particular percentage of media should be produced locally.

On 1 January 2000, the federation merged with the International Federation of Commercial, Clerical, Professional and Technical Employees, International Graphical Federation and Communications International, to form the Union Network International.

Throughout its existence the federation was led by general secretary Jim Wilson and president Tony Lennon.
