= Broadcasting and Entertainment Trades Alliance =

Former trade union of the United Kingdom

- Merged into: Broadcasting, Entertainment, Cinematograph and Theatre Union
- Founded: 1984
- Dissolved: 1991
- Headquarters: 181-185 Wardour Street, London
- Location: United Kingdom
- Key people: Tony Hearn; John Wilson
- Publication: BETA News
- Affiliations: TUC

The Broadcasting and Entertainment Trades Alliance (BETA) was a short-lived British entertainment trade union. It was founded in 1984 with the merger of the Association of Broadcasting Staff and the National Association of Theatrical Television and Kine Employees.

The union appointed two General Secretaries, Tony Hearn and John Wilson; Wilson standing down in 1987.

In 1991, BETA merged with the Association of Cinematograph, Television and Allied Technicians to form the Broadcasting, Entertainment, Cinematograph and Theatre Union.
