= Association of Cinematograph, Television and Allied Technicians =

Former trade union of the United Kingdom

ACTT
- Association of Cinematograph, Television and Allied Technicians
- Merged into: Broadcasting, Entertainment, Cinematograph and Theatre Union
- Founded: 1933
- Dissolved: 1991
- Headquarters: 2 Soho Square, London
- Location: United Kingdom
- Members: 20,021 (1982)
- Key people: George Elvin; Alan Sapper
- Publication: Film and TV Technician
- Affiliations: Labour Party

The Association of Cinematograph, Television and Allied Technicians (ACTT) was a trade union in the United Kingdom which existed between 1933 and 1991.

== History ==
The union was founded by technicians at the Gaumont British Studios in 1933 as the Association of Cine-Technicians, later becoming the Association of Cinematograph Technicians (ACT). By the following year, it was struggling; it had just 88 members, with only a quarter of those paid up, and it was in financial difficulties. George Elvin was appointed as its first General Secretary the following year, establishing a journal and an employment exchange. Within a year, membership was over 600 and the finances were in good shape. In 1936, the union affiliated to the Trades Union Congress.

ACT began organising film laboratory workers, and in 1943 it affiliated to the Labour Party. At the ACT annual general meeting of 1949 the union made the decision to create ACT Films Limited which with the support of the President of the Board of Trade, Harold Wilson, was established in 1950. In 1955, it extended its coverage to represent technicians working on ITV, and the following year incorporated "Television" into its name.

In the late 1950s, ACTT came into dispute with film directors John and Roy Boulting, and this may have partly inspired their film, I'm All Right Jack. ACTT were highly critical of the film's negative portrayal of trade unionists.

In 1969, Elvin was replaced as General Secretary by Alan Sapper. Sapper would play a leading role in the 1979 ITV strike.

The union repeatedly discussed potential mergers with the Association of Broadcasting Staff (ABS), which represented the equivalent workers at the BBC, but these foundered until in 1991 it merged with the Broadcasting and Entertainment Trades Alliance, the successor to the ABS, to form the Broadcasting, Entertainment, Cinematograph and Theatre Union (BECTU).

== Election results ==
The union sponsored its general secretary as a candidate in the 1951 general election.

Election	Constituency	Candidate	Votes	Percentage	Position
1951 general election	Oxford	George Elvin	25,427	44.0	2

== General Secretaries ==
1934: George Elvin
1969: Alan Sapper

== Presidents ==
1937: Anthony Asquith
1969: George Elvin
1974: Robert Bolt
Ron Bowie
1983: Bruce Anderson

== ACT Films Ltd ==
- Green Grow The Rushes (1950)
- Night Was Our Friend (1951)
- Circumstantial Evidence (1952)
- Private Information (1952)
- The Final Test (1952)
- The Blue Parrot (1953)
- House of Blackmail (1953)
- Burnt Evidence (1954)
- Final Appointment (1954)
- Dangerous Cargo (1954)
- Room in the House (1955)
- Stolen Assignment (1955)
- The Last Man to Hang? (1956)
- Suspended Alibi (1957)
- The Diplomatic Corpse (1957)
- Second Fiddle (1957)
- The Man Upstairs (1958)
- Dead Lucky (1959)
- Don't Panic Chaps! (1959)
- The Kitchen (1961)
- The Piper's Tune (1961)
- Dilemma (1962)
- We are the Engineers (1969)
- One in Five (1971)
- The People's March for Jobs (1981)

== Publications ==
- Action! Fifty Years in the Life of a Union. Published: 1983 (UK). Publisher: ACTT. ISBN 0 9508993 0 5.

"Patterns of discrimination", Report into discrimination against women in the work of making and processing materials for films and TV channels. Researched and written by Sarah Benton under the guidance of the union's research director Roy and union's women's committee. Published 1975 by ACTT.
