= Alan Sapper =

British trade union leader (1931–2006)

Alan Louis Geoffrey Sapper (18 March 1931 – 19 May 2006) was a British trade union leader.

== Biography ==
Alan Sapper was born in 1931 in Hammersmith, West London. He later said he developed a childhood interest in plants when observing how weeds grew back at bombsites during The Blitz of London in World War II. He attended Latymer Upper School, and then worked as a botanist at Kew Gardens where he catalogued several new fern species. He was meanwhile studying with the University of London External Programme.

His trade union involvement began while employed at Kew and serving as a branch official of the Institution of Professional Civil Servants. In 1958 he made a major career change from botanist to labour activist by joining the Association of Cinematograph, Television and Allied Technicians (ACTT) as assistant to the general secretary. Over the next few years, he also tried his hand at scriptwriting. In 1964 he ran the Writers' Guild of Great Britain. He returned to ACTT in 1967 as deputy general secretary before assuming the top job in 1969. He remained in the post until 1991 when the union merged with the Association of Broadcasting Staffs to form the Broadcasting Entertainment Cinematograph and Allied Trades Union (BECTU).

During his time as ACTT leader, Sapper acquired a reputation for favoring militant action to improve technicians' pay and conditions. He was sometimes labelled the "champion of free collective bargaining". One of his most celebrated actions occurred in 1979 when he led a strike against the ITV television network. The strike, which caused a ten-week blackout of ITV, ended in a new contract agreement that raised a technician's average wage by over 40%.

In an early attempt to address gender discrimination in the British film and television industries, Sapper, in consultation with his research officer Roy Lockett, approved the establishment in 1973 of an ACTT Committee on Equality; it produced a landmark 1975 report, Patterns of Discrimination against Women in the Film and Television Industries. However, Sapper was faulted for doing little to implement the report's recommendations.

Besides his tenure at ACTT, Sapper also served as president of the Trades Union Congress in 1982, president of the Confederation of Entertainment Unions from 1970 to 1991, and president of the International Federation of Audio Visual Workers from 1974 to 1994. During these years, he was on the Board of Governors of the British Film Institute.

Alan Sapper died on 19 May 2006, at age 75. He was survived by his wife Helen, and a son and daughter. Sapper's older brother Laurie was also a noted trade union leader.

Trade union offices
Preceded by George Elvin	General Secretary of ACTT; 1969–1991	Succeeded by Position abolished
Preceded by New position	General Secretary of ACTT; 1991; With: Tony Hearn	Succeeded by Tony Hearn
Preceded by Alan Fisher	President of the Trades Union Congress; 1982	Succeeded by Frank Chapple
