= Association of Broadcasting and Allied Staffs =

Former trade union of the United Kingdom

The Association of Broadcasting and Allied Staffs (ABS) was a British broadcasting trade union.

== History ==
The organisation was founded in 1945 with the merger of the BBC Staff (Wartime) Association and the Association of BBC Engineers to form the BBC Staff Association. It was regarded as a non-political organisation for employees of the BBC, but despite challenges from various trade unions, it remained the primary association of BBC employees. In 1946, Leslie Littlewood was elected General Secretary, a post he was to hold until 1968.

With the creation of ITV, the association aimed to expand its remit to cover the new broadcaster, and accordingly renamed itself the Association of Broadcasting Staff (ABS) in 1956. This was unsuccessful, but the ABS was recognised by the Independent Television Authority.

In 1963, the ABS finally affiliated to the Trades Union Congress (TUC), and was able to normalise its relations with other TUC members. It was renamed the Association of Broadcasting and Allied Staffs in 1974.

In 1972, Tony Hearn became General Secretary, and under his leadership, the union began negotiations with the National Association of Theatrical and Kine Employees. The two unions finally merged in 1984 to form the Broadcasting and Entertainment Trades Alliance.

As of 1982, the union had a membership of 15,510, and published a monthly journal, ABStract.

== General Secretaries ==
- 1945: Tom Hobson
- 1946: Leslie Littlewood
- 1968: Tom Rhys
- 1972: Tony Hearn
