= Mountview Academy of Theatre Arts =

Drama school

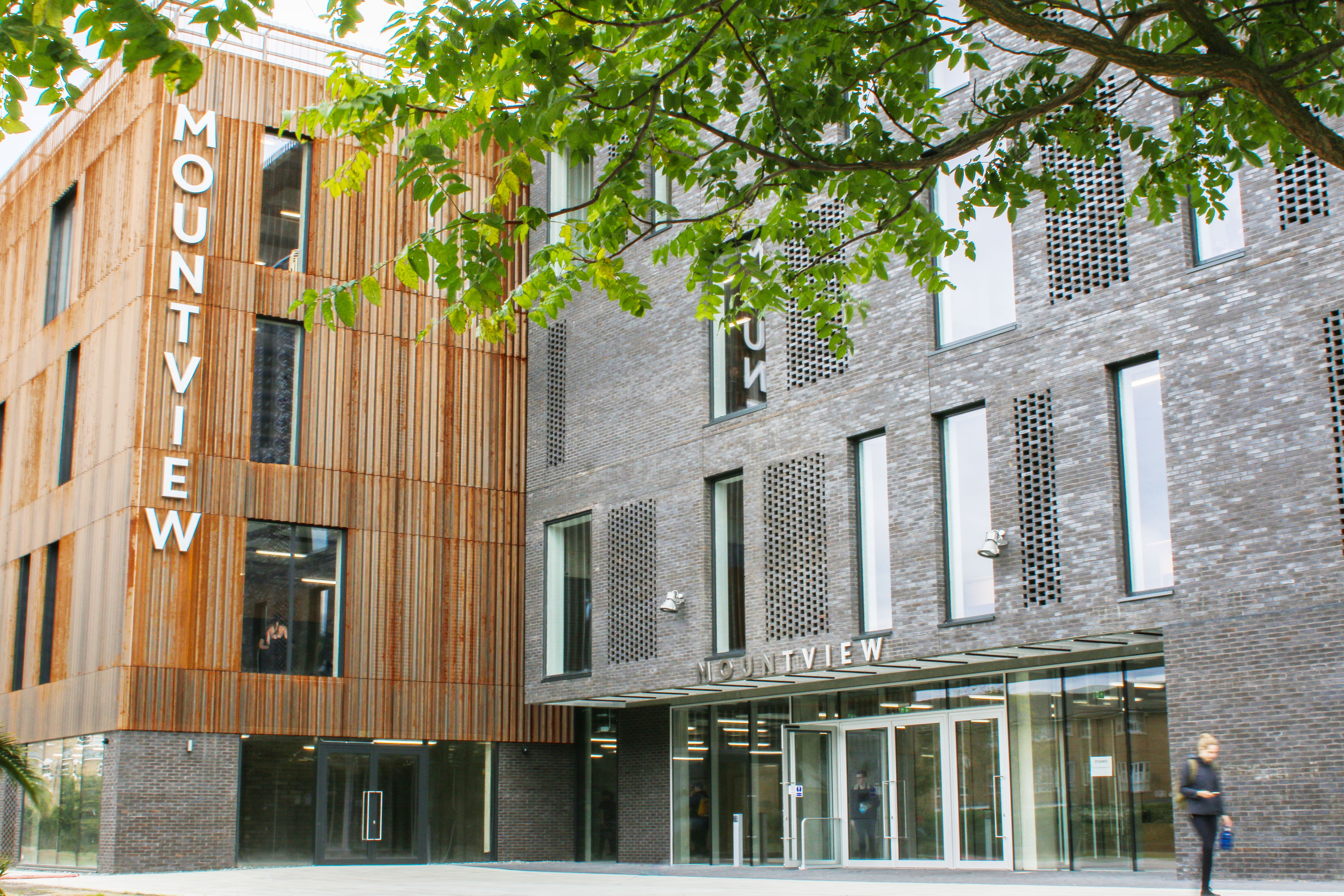
- Type: Drama school
- Established: 1945; 81 years ago
- Affiliations: Federation of Drama Schools
- Chairman: Dame Rosemary Squire
- President: Dame Judi Dench
- Principal: Sally Ann Gritton
- Location: 120 Peckham Hill Street, London, SE15 5JT, UK; 51°28′29″N 0°04′11″W
- Website: mountview.org.uk

Mountview Academy of Theatre Arts, formerly Mountview Theatre School, is a drama school in Peckham, south London, England, founded in 1945. Mountview Academy provides specialist vocational training in acting, musical theatre and actor musicianship, as well as production arts and theatre creative practices. The President of the school is Dame Judi Dench, and the Principal is Sally Ann Gritton.

== History ==
Mountview was founded in Crouch End, north London, in 1945 by Peter Coxhead and Ralph Nossek as "The Mountview Theatre Club", an amateur repertory company staging a new production for a six-day run every second week. Among the club's productions were Coxhead's staging of Eugene O'Neill's Mourning Becomes Electra, a production of the complete Arnold Wesker Trilogy – Chicken Soup with Barley, Roots and I'm Talking about Jerusalem directed by Peter Scott-Smith – and Buttered Both Sides, a revue written and composed by Mountview member Ted Dicks and directed by Gale Webb, which later transferred to the Fortune Theatre in London's West End.

Early in 1946, when 21 years old, Coxhead borrowed £2,300 to buy the lease of Cecile House, a large derelict property at Crouch End. Development at Cecile House included the conversion of a gymnasium into what became the Mountview Theatre.

The Mountview Theatre officially opened in November 1947 with a production of The Importance of Being Earnest. The theatre presented one play each month until 1949, after-which Coxhead bought the building outright from the leaseholders. For the next 25 years the theatre staged a new production every two to three weeks. Ralph Nossek went on to pursue a professional acting career in 1955 that lasted 56 years.

Acting courses and technical theatre skills training were introduced part-time from 1958 when Mountview Theatre School was formally recognised in name. Its first president was George Norman, with Coxhead as its principal. This remained the case for the next ten years.

In 1969 the school began full-time drama courses. In 1971 a second performance space was built and opened as the Judi Dench Theatre. There were also 10 working studios for acting students, three for technical students and a wardrobe with more than 15,000 costumes. By 1985 the school had leased additional premises at Wood Green, that were named the Sir Ralph Richardson Memorial Studios.

Coxhead retired as principal in 1996; he was replaced by Paul Clements, former director of drama at the Royal Welsh College of Music and Drama. Coxhead became chairman and chief executive of the school board until 2000, when Mountview Theatre School changed its name to the Mountview Academy of Theatre Arts, In 2001, Coxhead was appointed an MBE for Services to the Arts. He died in 2004, after 59 years involvement with the school.

Paul Clements remained as principal until 2008, when he was replaced by Sue Robertson, previously dean of the School of Arts at City University London, who was subsequently replaced by Stephen Jameson in 2014. Jameson was previously associate director at LAMDA.

In 2007, the British reality television show E4 School of Performing Arts offered several would-be actors the chance to win scholarships to Mountview, Italia Conti and the Academy of Contemporary Music. Mountview's Director of Acting Programme, Amir M. Korangy, appeared on the show as part of the panel.

In 2011, Mountview principal Robertson announced plans to relocate to part of Hornsey Town Hall in Crouch End, a stone's throw from Crouch Hill where it was founded, opening there for the 2014–15 academic year. A multi-use regeneration was planned for the Grade II-listed Town Hall and the site to its rear, a £19 million project. Haringey Council's cabinet approved the plan on 26 April 2011 on the basis of a business case that included Mountview. The plan fell through when Mountview withdrew, and in 2016 Mountview received planning permission for a new site in Peckham, south-east London. The new building opened in September 2018.

== Full-time courses ==
Foundation

- Foundation course in acting
- Foundation course in musical theatre
- Foundation course in musical theatre – Manchester

Undergraduate

- BA Hons in performance – acting
- BA Hons in performance – actor musicianship
- BA Hons in performance – musical theatre
- FdA/BA Hons in stage management
- FdA/BA Hons in technical production

Postgraduate

- MA in performance – acting
- MA in performance – musical theatre
- MA in creative producing
- MA in musical direction
- MA in theatre directing
- MA in site-specific theatre practice
- MA in theatre for community and education
- MFA in intimacy practice
- PG diploma in stage and production management

== Short courses ==
- 3 week musical theatre boot camp
- 3 week acting summer master class
- Community outreach program
- Haringey young peoples bursary
- Young peoples classes
- Young peoples summer school

== Presidents ==
- George Norman 1958–1969
- Dame Margaret Rutherford 1969–1972
- Sir Ralph Richardson 1972–1983
- Sir John Mills 1983–2005
- Dame Judi Dench 2006–present

== Principals ==
- Peter Coxhead 1958–1996
- Paul Clements 1996–2008
- Sue Robertson 2008–2013
- Stephen Jameson 2013–2021
- Sally Ann Gritton 2022–present

== Notable alumni ==
- Kelly Adams
- Scott Ainslie, Former Green Party Member of the European Parliament for London and Lambeth Councillor
- Mina Anwar
- Julie Atherton
- Glynis Barber
- Alecky Blythe
- Liana Bridges
- Jonathan Butterell
- Lindsey Coulson
- Brendan Coyle
- Curtiss Cook
- Josh Dallas
- Tim Downie
- Tim Dutton
- Sally Dynevor
- Justin Edwards
- Alice Fearn
- Michael Fentiman
- Connie Fisher
- Edward Hall
- Michael Hague
- Steve Halliwell
- Louisa Harland
- Douglas Henshall
- Amanda Holden
- Jim Howick
- Tyrone Huntley
- Ibinabo Jack
- Dean John-Wilson
- Leanne Jones
- Ayub Khan-Din
- Rowena King
- Eddie Marsan
- Gracie McGonigal
- Leigh Lawson
- Twiggy Lawson
- Nick Moran
- Euan Morton
- Craig Parkinson
- Stuart Matthew Price
- Sharon Small
- Enzo Squillino Jr.
- Rhashan Stone
- Ken Stott
- Giles Terera
- Rebecca Trehearn
- Denise Welch
- Jack Wolfe
- Grace Hodgett Young

== Sources ==
- Mountview Academy of Theatre Arts (2009). Prospectus 2009 (PDF).
- "Dench is appointed Mountview president". The Stage. London. 30 March 2006. p. 6. ISSN 0038-9099.
- "Mountview Academy plans £19m move". The Stage. London. 11 May 2011. ISSN 0038-9099.
- Hardiman, David (27 April 2011). "Approval for Hornsey Town Hall handover to Mountview Academy of Theatre Arts". Haringey Independent. London.
