= Alan Howard (actor) =

British actor (1937–2015)

Alan Howard CBE
- Born: Alan MacKenzie Howard; 5 August 1937; Croydon, Surrey, England
- Died: 14 February 2015 (aged 77); Hampstead, London, England
- Burial place: Highgate Cemetery
- Occupation: Actor
- Years active: 1961–2012
- Spouses: Stephanie Hinchliffe Davies (m. 1965; div. 1976); Sally Beauman (m. 2004)
- Father: Arthur Howard
- Website: www.alanhoward.org.uk

Alan MacKenzie Howard CBE (5 August 1937 – 14 February 2015) was an English actor. He was a member of the Royal Shakespeare Company from 1966 to 1983 and played leading roles at the Royal National Theatre between 1992 and 2000.

== Early life ==
Howard was born in Croydon, Surrey, the only son of actor Arthur Howard and his wife Jean Compton (Mackenzie). His uncle was Leslie Howard, the film star, while his aunt was the casting director Irene Howard. On his mother's side he was also a great-nephew of the actress Fay Compton and the novelist Sir Compton Mackenzie. He was educated at the independent school Ardingly College in Ardingly, West Sussex.

== Theatre career ==
=== 1958–1965 ===
Alan Howard made his first stage appearance at the Belgrade Theatre, Coventry, in April 1958, as a footman in Half In Earnest. He remained with the company until 1960, where his roles included Frankie Bryant in Arnold Wesker's Roots in June 1959. The production first transferred to the Royal Court Theatre and then the Duke of York's Theatre in July 1959, where he made his West End debut in the role.

Returning to the Belgrade he played Dave Simmonds in Wesker's I'm Talking About Jerusalem in April 1960. This was followed by Monty Blatt in Chicken Soup with Barley at the Royal Court during June and July 1960, completing the Wesker Trilogy with a revival of Roots and the transfer of I'm Talking About Jerusalem (as 1st Removal Man).

At the Pembroke Theatre in Croydon he played Kenny Baird in A Loss of Roses during January 1961, and the following month a return to the Royal Court as de Piraquo in Tony Richardson's production of Thomas Middleton and William Rowley's Jacobean tragedy The Changeling, then little known.

In 1962 he was cast as the Duke of Ferrara in John Fletcher's The Chances and Nearchus in John Ford's The Broken Heart, both at the Chichester Festival Theatre in its inaugural season. A year later in April 1963 he played Loveless in Virtue in Danger, a musical version of Vanbrugh's The Relapse, first at the Mermaid Theatre before transferring to the Strand Theatre in June 1963. He ended the year playing Fotheringham in Anthony Powell's Afternoon Men at the New Arts Theatre in August 1963.

Engaged by H.M. Tennent Productions, 1964 brought him an international tour of South America and Europe, playing both Bassanio in The Merchant of Venice and Lysander in A Midsummer Night's Dream. Staged by Wendy Toye and starring Ralph Richardson, the productions were first seen at the Theatre Royal, Brighton.

At the Phoenix Theatre in May 1965 he was "boldly playing" Simon Challoner in Julian Mitchell's fine stage adaptation of A Heritage and Its History; ending the year at the Nottingham Playhouse as Angelo in Measure for Measure and Bolingbroke in Richard II, co-starring with Judi Dench and Edward Woodward.

=== 1966–1979 ===
Howard first joined the Royal Shakespeare Company at Stratford-upon-Avon in 1966, cast as Orsino in Twelfth Night, Burgundy in Henry V and Lussurioso in The Revenger's Tragedy. Subsequent RSC roles, all at Stratford unless otherwise stated, included:

- Jacques in As You Like It 1967
- Young Fashion in The Relapse (Aldwych Theatre) 1967
- Edgar in King Lear, Achilles in Troilus and Cressida and Benedick (to Janet Suzman's Beatrice) in Much Ado About Nothing 1968 (these three roles also in Aldwych revivals)
- Jacques in As You Like It (Los Angeles) 1968
- Bartholomew Cokes in Bartholomew Fair and Lussurioso in The Revenger's Tragedy (both Aldwych) 1969
- Benedick in Much Ado About Nothing (Los Angeles) 1969
- Mephistophilis in Doctor Faustus, title role in Hamlet, Theseus/Oberon in A Midsummer Night's Dream and Ceres in The Tempest 1970
- Theseus/Oberon in A Midsummer Night's Dream (New York debut at the Billy Rose Theatre) January 1971
- Theseus/Oberon in A Midsummer Night's Dream, Nikolai in Maxim Gorky's Enemies, Dorimant in The Man of Mode and The Envoy in The Balcony (Aldwych) 1971–72
- Cyril Jackson in The Black and White Minstrels by C.P. Taylor (Not RSC – Traverse Theatre, Edinburgh) July 1972
- Toured as Theseus/Oberon (visiting Eastern and Western Europe, the US, Japan and Australia) August 1972 – August 1973

Howard then played Eric von Stroheim in The Ride Across Lake Constance at the Hampstead Theatre in November 1973, transferring to the May Fair Theatre in December; and again played Cyril in The Black and White Minstrels, revived at Hampstead in January 1974, before returning to the RSC, where his roles included:

- Carlos II in The Bewitched Aldwych, May 1974
- Title role in Henry V, and Prince Hal in the two parts of Henry IV Stratford 1975; Aldwych, January 1976
- Rover in Wild Oats, co-starring with Jeremy Irons, Aldwych, December 1976
- Title role in Henry V, also the title roles in the three parts of Henry VI and Coriolanus Stratford 1977; Newcastle Season, at the Theatre Royal, Newcastle upon Tyne 13 February – 25 March 1978; and Aldwych, summer 1978
- Mark Antony in Antony and Cleopatra Stratford, October 1978; Aldwych, July 1979
- Chepurnoy in Maxim Gorky's Children of the Sun Aldwych, October 1979

=== 1980–2011 ===
- Title roles in Richard II and Richard III, Stratford 1980; Aldwych, November 1981
- The Hollow Crown, devised by John Barton, RSC Fortune Theatre July–August 1981
- Pleasure and Repentance, devised by Terry Hands, RSC Fortune Theatre July–August 1981
- Gennady in The Forest by Alexander Ostrovsky, The Other Place, Stratford 1981; RSC Donmar Warehouse, July 1981; Aldwych February 1982
- Halder in Good by C.P. Taylor, music by George Fenton, RSC Donmar Warehouse, September 1981; Aldwych April 1982; Booth Theatre, New York October 1982 (141 NY performances).

Alan Howard then left the Royal Shakespeare Company. Subsequent performances included:

- Geoffrey in Winter by David Mowatt (rehearsed reading) Orange Tree Theatre July 1983
- War Music by Christopher Logue from Homer's Iliad, Almeida Theatre 1984, followed by a British Council tour of the UK and Greece
- Nikolai Pesiakoff in Breaking the Silence by Stephen Poliakoff, revived at the Mermaid Theatre May–November 1985
- Johan in Ingmar Bergman's Scenes from a Marriage (with Penny Downie as Marianne), Chichester and Wyndham's Theatre November 1990
- Henry Higgins in Bernard Shaw's Pygmalion (with Frances Barber as Eliza) National Theatre, Olivier April 1992
- Kings adapted from Homer by Christopher Logue, National Theatre, Cottesloe, September 1992; and Tricycle Theatre, April 1997
- Title role in Macbeth (with Anastasia Hille as Lady Macbeth) National Theatre, Olivier, April 1993
- George in Jean Cocteau's Les Parents terribles, National Theatre, Lyttelton May 1994
- William in Meredith Oakes' The Editing Process, National Theatre Studio at the Royal Court, November 1994
- Calogero di Spelta in Eduardo De Filippo's La Grande Magia, National Theatre, Lyttelton, July 1995
- The Player King in Tom Stoppard's Rosencrantz and Guildenstern Are Dead, National Theatre, Lyttelton, December 1995
- Title role in The Oedipus Plays: Oedipus the King and Oedipus at Colonus adapted from Sophocles by Ranjit Bolt, Athens Festival at Epidaurus and National Theatre of Greece, Olivier, September 1996
- Vladimir in Samuel Beckett's Waiting for Godot, Old Vic Theatre, June 1997
- Title role in King Lear (with Victoria Hamilton as Cordelia), Old Vic, September 1997
- Roman Khludov in Mikhail Bulgakov's Flight, National Theatre, Olivier, February 1998
- Man in Edward Albee's The Play About the Baby, Almeida Theatre, September 1998
- Dr Austin Sloper in The Heiress, play adapted by Ruth and Augustus Goetz from the novel by Henry James, National Theatre, Lyttelton, June 2000
- Dr Schoning in Lulu, adapted by Nicholas Wright from the play by Frank Wedekind, Almeida at King's Cross, March 2001
- Teiresias in Sophocles' Oedipus in a 'raw new version' by Frank McGuinness, co-starring Ralph Fiennes and Clare Higgins, directed by Jonathan Kent, National Theatre, Olivier, from 8 October 2008
- Sir Peter Teazle in The School for Scandal (directed by Deborah Warner) at the Barbican Centre, 2011.

A complete listing of Howard's theatre credits, including early work at the Belgrade Theatre, Coventry, appears on his career website, qv.

Howard played all Shakespeare's consecutive eponymous English kings; though the distinction depends on a Henry IV played (as Henry Bolingbroke) in Richard II (at Nottingham) rather than in Henry IV, Part 1.

== Theatre awards ==
Howard won his first Plays and Players award in 1969, voted by the London theatre critics as the Most Promising Actor in the RSC repertoire. His second came in 1977, again voted for by the London critics, when he won as Best Actor for his RSC performances in Wild Oats, the three parts of Henry VI and Coriolanus. In 1981 he again received the Plays and Players critics' award for Best Actor for his roles in Richard II and Good by C.P. Taylor.

He twice gained the Evening Standard Award Best Actor trophy for his performances in Coriolanus (1978) and Good (1981).

He also won the Society of West End Theatre award for Best Actor (1976) for his performances as Prince Hal in Henry IV, Part One and Part Two and Henry V and in 1978 as Best Actor in a Revival for Coriolanus (these are now known as the Olivier Awards).

Other awards include the 1980 Variety Club Best Actor Award for the title roles in Richard II and Richard III; and the Drama magazine (British Theatre Association) Award for Best Actor (joint) 1981, for Richard II, Good and The Forest.

== Television ==
Television performances include Philoctetes, The Way of the World and Comets Among the Stars.

He played a spymaster in the Thames Television six-hour spy story Cover, written by Philip Mackie, 1981; and played John Osborne's father, Tom Osborne, in A Better Class of Person, Thames 1985. He also played the title role of Coriolanus in the 1984 BBC Shakespeare production.

Howard played the lead character of Sam McCready, an intelligence agent, in the 1989–1990 television movie series Frederick Forsyth Presents. He was also seen in such series as Notorious Woman, The Return of Sherlock Holmes, Midsomer Murders and Foyle's War. He was Spenlow in David Copperfield (2000) and Maurice Wilkins in Life Story.

== Film ==
He made occasional film appearances, including a significant role in Peter Greenaway's The Cook, the Thief, His Wife & Her Lover (1989) as Michael, "The Lover" who carries on a doomed affair with "The Wife" Georgina played by Helen Mirren. He also supplied the voice of Sauron and the One Ring in The Lord of the Rings: The Fellowship of the Ring and The Lord of the Rings: The Return of the King.

== Personal life ==
He first married actress and theatre designer Stephanie Hinchcliff Davies in 1965 (marriage dissolved). He met his second wife, the novelist and journalist Sally Beauman, when she interviewed him about his performance as Hamlet at Stratford in 1970. They became lovers not long afterwards, and married in 2004. They had one son and two grandchildren. Howard was appointed CBE (Commander of the Order of the British Empire) in 1998.

== Death ==
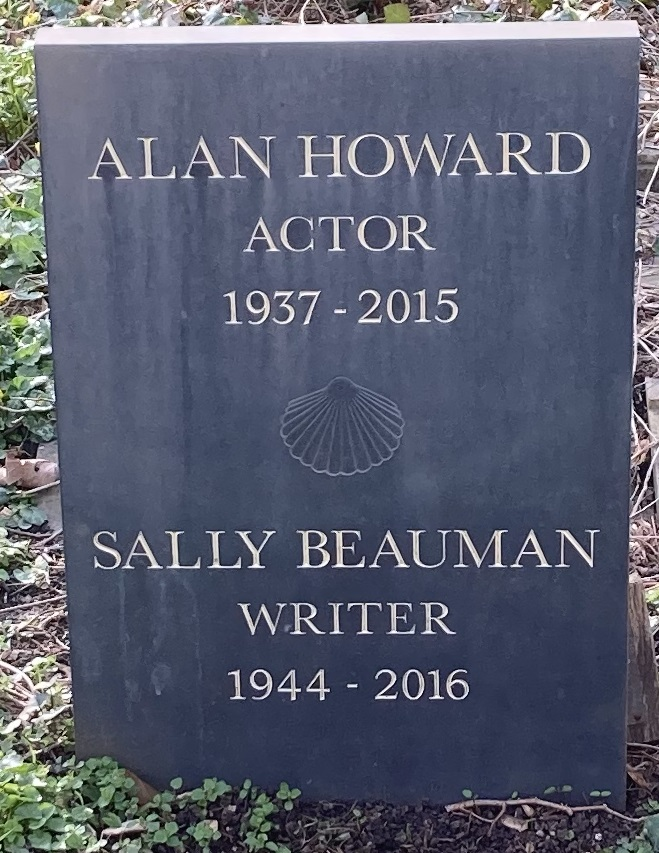
Grave of Alan Howard and Sally Beauman in Highgate Cemetery

Howard died on 14 February 2015 at the Royal Free Hospital in Hampstead, London, of pneumonia. His grave is on the east side of Highgate Cemetery, where Sally Beauman, who died a year later, is also buried.

== Filmography ==
=== Film ===
| Year | Title | Role | Notes |
|---|---|---|---|
| 1961 | Victim | Frank | |
| 1963 | The V.I.P.s | Second Reporter | Uncredited |
| 1964 | The Americanization of Emily | Port Ensign | |
| 1965 | The Heroes of Telemark | Oli | |
| 1968 | Work Is a Four-Letter Word | Reverend Mort | |
| 1984 | Oxford Blues | Simon Rutledge | |
| 1989 | The Return of the Musketeers | Oliver Cromwell | |
| 1989 | Strapless | Mr. Cooper | |
| 1989 | The Cook, the Thief, His Wife & Her Lover | Michael (The Lover) | |
| 1990 | Antigone/Rites of Passion | Haemon & Polynices | Voice |
| 1992 | Dakota Road | Alan Brandon | |
| 1993 | The Secret Rapture | Tom French | |
| 2001 | The Lord of the Rings: The Fellowship of the Ring | Sauron / The One Ring | Voice |
| 2003 | The Lord of the Rings: The Return of the King | Sauron / The One Ring | Voice |

=== Television ===
| Year | Title | Role | Notes |
|---|---|---|---|
| 1962 | Heart to Heart | Parliamentary Private Secretary | TV movie |
| 1962 | Maigret | Gerry Wilton | Episode: “The Amateurs” |
| 1974 | Notorious Woman | Prosper Merimee | Miniseries, 2 episodes |
| 1984 | The Tragedy of Coriolanus | Caius Marcius | TV movie |
| 1985 | Screen Two | Clement Scott | Episode: "Poppyland" |
| 1986 | The Return of Sherlock Holmes | The Duke of Holdernesse | Episode: "The Priory School" |
| 1987 | A Perfect Spy | Jack Brotherhood | Miniseries |
| 1987 | Life Story | Maurice Wilkins | TV movie |
| 1989 | Agatha Christie's Poirot | Benedict Farley/Hugo Cornworthy | Episode: "The Dream" |
| 1989–1990 | Frederic Forsyth Presents: A Casualty of War | Sam McCready | 3 episodes |
| 2000 | David Copperfield | Mr. Spenlow | TV movie |
| 2001 | Midsomer Murders | Owen August | Episode: "Dark Autumn" |
| 2003 | Death in Holy Orders | Father Sebastian Morell | Miniseries |
| 2003 | Foyle's War | Stephen Beck | Episode: "War Games" |
| 2012 | Parade's End | Tietjens Senior | Miniseries, 3 episodes |
