= William Dronfield =

British trade unionist

William Dronfield (April 1826 – 24 August 1894) was a British trade unionist.

Born in Sheffield, Dronfield became a compositor. In 1849, he was a founder member of the Provincial Typographical Association, and from 1852 to 1855 served as its president.

In 1858, many Sheffield compositors were involved in a dispute with the owner of the Sheffield Times newspaper. In order to build solidarity for their cause, they founded the Sheffield Association of Organised Trades. Dronfield was elected as its first secretary, a post he held until 1867.

Through this organisation, Dronfield became active in many national campaigns; in particular, against the Master and Servant Act, against which he helped organise a national conference in 1864.

In 1865, Dronfield presented a paper on trade unions at the conference of the National Association for the Promotion of Social Science, a bourgeois organisation which aimed to include industrial relations in its remit. However, details of his speech and the debate sparked by it were omitted from the official report. A second intervention, calling for state aid for education, was included.

Disappointment at the body's indifference to labour matters convinced him of the need for a national trade union organisation. He called a conference in Sheffield in 1866 which organised the United Kingdom Alliance of Organised Trades, and he was elected as its secretary.

Dronfield was appointed as the honorary secretary of the Sheffield Trades Defence Committee, founded in the aftermath of the Sheffield Outrages, and so gave evidence in support of the legalisation of trade union activity.

Dronfield convinced two members of the Manchester and Salford Trades Council, William Henry Wood and Samuel Caldwell Nicholson, of the need for a national organisation, and this inspired them to call a meeting in Manchester in 1868. Dronfield attended this as a representative of the Sheffield Association of Organised Trades, and played a prominent role in the proceedings. The meeting resolved to found the Trades Union Congress.

Dronfield supported the Reform League, and in order to further labour interests, he convinced Anthony John Mundella to stand as the Liberal Party candidate for Sheffield in the 1868 general election. Mundella took a seat.

Also in 1868, Dronfield became the secretary of the newly formed National Education League. He represented Sheffield at the Workmen's International Exhibition in 1870, and later became a sanitary inspector, calling for improvements to Sheffield's sanitation systems.

Dronfield died in 1894 and is buried in Sheffield General Cemetery.

Trade union offices
Preceded by New position	Secretary of the Association of Organised Trades of Sheffield and Neighbourhood; 1858 - 1872	Succeeded by James Pryor
