= Andrew Conley =

British trade unionist

Andrew Conley (18 December 1881 – 5 June 1952) was a British trade unionist.

Born in Leeds to Irish parents, Conley fought in the Second Boer War. He then worked as a garment maker, and became a branch secretary in the Amalgamated Union of Clothiers Operatives, then national organiser of its successor, the United Garment Workers' Trade Union.

In 1920, various tailors' trade unions merged to form the National Union of Tailors and Garment Workers (NUTGW). Although Joseph Young was seen as the obvious choice for its leadership, his health was failing, and he instead supported Conley's successful campaign for the general secretaryship. In post, he focussed on absorbing other unions, arranging mergers with more than 20 before he retired in 1948. He was elected to the General Council of the Trades Union Congress in 1921, and was its President in 1934, where he led centenary commemorations of the Tolpuddle Martyrs.

Conley also supported women's trade unionism, encouraging women tailors to become active in the NUTGW, and he was succeeded as general secretary by Anne Loughlin.

Trade union offices
Preceded by New position	General Secretary of the National Union of Tailors and Garment Workers; 1920–1948	Succeeded by Anne Loughlin
Preceded by New position	Clothing Group representative on the General Council of the TUC; 1921 – 1949	Succeeded by Anne Loughlin
Preceded by New position	Chairman of the Trades Councils' Joint Consultative Committee; 1925 – 1934	Succeeded by George Hicks
Preceded by Alexander Walkden	President of the Trades Union Congress; 1934	Succeeded by William Kean
Preceded by John Stokes and Alexander Walkden	Trades Union Congress representative to the American Federation of Labour; 1935; With: Andrew Naesmith	Succeeded by George Gibson and William Kean
Preceded by Tonnis van der Heeg	General Secretary of the International Clothing Workers' Federation; 1946–1949	Succeeded by Ian Milner
