= Sarah Wesker =

British trade unionist (1901–1971)

- Born: 1901
- Died: 1971 (aged 69–70)
- Organization(s): National Union of Tailors and Garment Workers. United Ladies Tailors' Trade Union
- Known for: Communist activism, trade union activity, participation in the Battle of Cable Street, co-founder of the United Clothing Workers' Union (UCWU)
- Political party: Communist Party of Great Britain (CPGB)
- Relatives: Arnold Wesker (nephew)

Sarah Wesker (1901–1971) was a trade unionist active in the garment industry in the East End of London in the 1920s and 1930s.

== Biography ==
Wesker grew up in the Rothschild Buildings, a block of flats in Spitalfields, tenanted mainly by Jewish families. She was on the executive committee of the National Union of Tailors and Garment Workers (NUTGW) before joining the United Ladies Tailors' Trade Union (ULTTU), a Jewish trade union.

Wesker was involved in the organisation of many strikes by garment workers in the East End. At Goodman's trouser factory in 1926, where she worked as a machinist, she led the all-female workforce in a walk out demanding a farthing a pair. In 1928 she organised 600 young women at the Rego Factory on Bethnal Green Road. The strike lasted for 12 weeks until the workers won at Christmas. As the strike was not recognised by the national leadership of the NUTGW, the workers raised money by singing "strike songs" and collecting money around London, activities orchestrated by Wesker. In 1929 she took a leading part in the strike at Polikoff's, a factory at 148-160 Mare Street in Hackney.There the strikers also sang. In 1930 she led a strike at the Simpson factory, also in Hackney.

In 1929, Wesker was a founding member of the United Clothing Workers' Union (UCWU). She was the only female member of its executive committee, and later became its full-time women's organiser. The UCWU was absorbed into the NUTGW in 1935. Wesker again sat on the NUTGW executive committee and her appointment in 1937 as NUTGW women's organiser signalled a new approach to female workers. She helped women to become organised in a number of large factories.

Wesker was elected to the Communist Party of Great Britain's Central Committee at the 12th Congress in 1932. Along with other women, she took part in the Battle of Cable Street on 4 October 1936.

Wesker was fluent in English and Yiddish and was known to be a fiery speaker, able to inspire the older women workers in the factories. The playwright Arnold Wesker was her nephew, and based the character Sarah in his play Chicken Soup with Barley on his aunt.
