= Gurney Rowlerson =

British trade unionist

Gurney Rowlerson (10 July 1862 – 29 July 1944) was a British trade unionist.

Rowlerson was born in Veryan, Cornwall, to wool agent George Walter Rowlerson and Catherine Isabella Rowlerson (née Walker). He worked as a tailor and became active in the Amalgamated Society of Tailors and Tailoresses (ASTT). He was elected to its executive council in 1900, soon becoming a full-time employee of the union, and was elected as its general secretary in 1925.

Rowlerson was consistently critical of the formation of rival unions in the tailoring industry, many of which organised Jewish workers. In 1908, he opposed the formation of the London Ladies' Tailors' Union, saying that "...most of the ladies' tailors' are foreigners". In 1915, he tried, unsuccessfully, to persuade the General Federation of Trade Unions to get various small affiliates to become branches of the ASTT rather than form the United Garment Workers' Trade Union (UGWTU). He was sometimes critical of Jewish people in general, claiming that Jewish branch secretaries in the ASTT were inefficient and mismanaged finances. However, by the 1920s, he moderated his positions and tried to encourage Jewish workers to join the ASTT.

In 1932, Rowlerson led the ASTT into the National Union of Tailors and Garment Workers, becoming the union's general president. He retired in 1937, although he continued to serve as the union's representative on the Retail Bespoke Tailoring Trade Board.

Trade union offices
Preceded by T. A. Flynn	General Secretary of the Amalgamated Society of Tailors and Tailoresses; 1925–1932	Succeeded by Position abolished
