= Jacob Fine =

Trade union leader (1883–1971)

Jacob Fine OBE
- Born: 27 June 1993; Russian Empire
- Died: 23 May 1971 (aged 87)
- Organizations: United Ladies Tailors' Trade Union; National Union of Tailors and Garment Workers
- Political party: Labour Party

Jacob Lewis Fine OBE (27 June 1883 – 23 May 1971) was a Russian trade union leader, active in the United Kingdom.

Fine was born in the Russian Empire, but moved to London in his youth. He began working in the clothing industry, and developed an interest in trade unionism, working as an organiser for the United Ladies Tailors' Trade Union from 1912. In 1918, he was elected as the union's general secretary. Like most of the union's members, Fine was Jewish, and he found that his fluency in Yiddish helped him in the post.

Fine tried to strengthen the union by organising mergers with as many smaller ladies' tailors unions as possible. On the urging of the Trades Union Congress, he discussed a possible merger with the Amalgamated Society of Tailors and Tailoresses and the Tailors and Garment Workers Trade Union, but decided against joining either union. However, in 1939, he led it into an amalgamation with the National Union of Tailors and Garment Workers (NUTGW). The union became the London ladies' tailoring branch of the NUTGW, with Fine as full-time branch secretary.

Fine was a supporter of the Labour Party, for which he served on Stepney Borough Council. He also served as a magistrate. In 1948, he was made an Officer of the Order of the British Empire.

Trade union offices
Preceded by Salve Josephs	General Secretary of the United Ladies Tailors' Trade Union; 1912–1939	Succeeded by Position abolished
