= William Rolley =

British trade unionist and political activist

William Rolley (1839 – 1912) was a British trade unionist and political activist.

Born at Bonsall-in-the-Peak in Derbyshire, Rolley worked at Cromford Mill in his youth. He later undertook a wide variety of jobs, including police officer, engine driver, steelworker, and farrier, and at some point moved to Sheffield.

An active trade unionist, Rolley was elected as chairman of the Sheffield Federated Trades Council when it was reconstituted in 1874, following the Sheffield Outrages. This was an influential organisation, and in 1875 it hosted the national Trades Union Congress (TUC) at the Temperance Hotel in Sheffield, with Rolley elected as President of the TUC. He subsequently also served on the Parliamentary Committee of the TUC.

Rolley developed an interest in politics. At the 1874 general election, he supported Joseph Chamberlain of Liberal Party when he stood unsuccessfully in Sheffield, and some people believed that it was Rolley who had first asked Chamberlain to contest the election in the city. Rolley was elected to the Sheffield School Board in 1876, and in 1883 he was a founder of the Sheffield Labour Electoral Association, which aimed to secure seats for working men at the local and national levels. He hoped to be selected as the Liberal-Labour candidate for Sheffield Attercliffe at the 1885 general election, but was not chosen. He was disappointed by this, and although he supported Irish Home Rule, he felt that party members were overly critical of Chamberlain for his opposition to the policy.

In 1888, Rolley joined the Conservative Party, stating that "the working classes were likely to get as much from the Tories as from the Liberals". He was made a full-time agent for the party, serving in this post for the remainder of his career.

Trade union offices
Preceded by William Lishman	President of the Trades Union Congress; 1874	Succeeded by James Fitzpatrick
