= Wesker =

Wesker is a surname. Notable people with the surname include:

- Arnold Wesker (1932–2016), English playwright
- Sarah Wesker (1901–1971), English trade unionist

== Fictional characters ==
- Albert Wesker, a character in the video game series Resident Evil
- Alex Wesker, sister of Albert, a character in the video game series Resident Evil
- Arnold Wesker, the real name of the Ventriloquist, a Batman villain
