= Charles Hobson (trade unionist) =

British trade unionist

Charles Hobson (25 February 1845 – 28 October 1923) was a British trade unionist.

Born in Sheffield, Hobson completed an apprenticeship in metalworking, and worked until the 1890s with Britannia metal at Atkin Brothers. In 1866, he joined the Britannia Metal Workers' Union and, after a few years, became its delegate to Sheffield Trades Council.

By the mid-1880s, Hobson was one of the more prominent trade unionists in Sheffield. He was the secretary of a committee investigating products falsely claiming to be made in Sheffield. In 1887, he was elected as secretary of the trades council, in which role he increased its membership, gaining affiliations from more engineering unions. In 1895, he enthusiastically led the council into the Industrial Union of Employers and Employed, although this did not get widespread support from trade unions, and soon collapsed.

Hobson was a supporter of the Labour Electoral Association, and the Sheffield Labour Association, which supported working men as Liberal-Labour candidates. He was elected to Sheffield Town Council in 1887, representing St George's ward, and also to the Sheffield School Board in 1893, and the Board of Guardians in 1894. He was proposed as a candidate for the 1894 Sheffield Attercliffe by-election, although this was opposed by much of the local Liberal Party, who thought a working class candidate would lose a seat with a substantial Conservative vote and struggle to raise money for the campaign. This experience increased support for the new Independent Labour Party (ILP), with which Hobson had some sympathy, although he never joined, instead retaining membership of the Liberal group on the council.

Hobson also attended the Trades Union Congress (TUC), and he was elected to serve on its Parliamentary Committee in 1900 and 1901.

During the 1890s, Hobson became wealthier, setting up first a greengrocers' shop, then a brick making firm, and finally dealing in property. However, his business partner, Warrington Slater, was declared bankrupt in 1903. During proceedings, it emerged that Hobson had been involved in corrupt dealings: while a member of the city's Health Committee, he had received a £100 commission from Slater after the committee had bought some land owned by Slater. Hobson refused to resign, but Arnold Muir Wilson, a Conservative Party councillor, brought a prosecution against him, and he was sentenced to three months in prison.

Following his imprisonment, Hobson resigned all his positions, but he retained significant public sympathy. On release, he again became involved with the trades council, and arranged a deal between its rival Liberal-Labour and Independent Labour Party supporters. However, this soon broke down, and in 1908 the council split, with Hobson re-elected as president of the Lib-Lab version of the council.

Hobson was injured when he was hit by a motor vehicle in 1916, and his health did not fully recover. He resigned his trades council post in 1917, although he continued to write newspaper articles, arguing that strikes should be avoided.

== Sources ==
- Brown, Joyce. "Attercliffe, 1894: How One Local Liberal Party Failed to Meet the Challenge of Labour". The Journal of British Studies. 14 (2): 48–77.
- Mathers, Helen. "Hobson, Charles (1845-1923)". Dictionary of Labour Biography. Vol. VII. pp. 121–123.

Trade union offices
Preceded by Hermann Vogelsanger	General Secretary of the International Metalworkers' Federation; 1896–1904	Succeeded by Alexander Schlicke
Preceded by William F. Wardley	President of the Sheffield Trades Council; 1887–1903	Succeeded by ?
Preceded by ?	President of the Sheffield Federated Trades Council; 1908 – 1917	Succeeded by ?
Preceded by Henry Boothman and Frank Hodges	Auditor of the Trades Union Congress; 1918; With: A. B. Hall	Succeeded by John Robertson and Ben Smith
