= Amalgamated Union of Clothiers Operatives =

The Amalgamated Union of Clothiers' Operatives (AUCO) was a trade union representing clothing factory workers in the United Kingdom.

The union was founded in 1894 when the Bristol Clothiers' Cutters' Trade Association merged with the Leeds Wholesale Clothiers' Operatives' Union, and it was originally known as the Amalgamated Union of Wholesale Clothing Operatives. The leading founders were Arthur Evans, William N. Pitts and Joseph Young, and they hoped to create a national industrial union.

The union established its office in Leeds, and by the end of 1894 had also absorbed small unions based in Glossop, Hebden Bridge, Manchester, Nantwich and Wigan. Membership was only 506, but in 1895 Pitts moved to become treasurer, with Young becoming general secretary, and the union began a steady growth, membership reaching 1,400 in 1900, and 3,337 in 1910. It continued to rise rapidly, and by the start of World War I its membership was nearly equal to that of the Amalgamated Society of Tailors and Tailoresses (AST&T), the leading union in the industry. It proposed a merger, but the AST&T rejected this, fearing it would be dominated by the more radical AUCO.

In 1915, the union instead completed a merger with the Amalgamated Jewish Tailors', Machinists' and Pressers' Trade Union, the London and Provincial Clothiers' Cutters' Trade Union, the London Jewish Tailors Union, the London Society of Tailors and Tailoresses and the Waterproof Garment Workers' Trade Union, forming the United Garment Workers' Trade Union.

== General Secretaries ==
1894: William N. Pitts
1895: Joseph Young
