= Moses Sclare =

Ukrainian trade union leader in the UK

Moses Sclare (29 July 1867 – 8 September 1949) was a Ukrainian trade union leader, active in the United Kingdom.

Born to a Jewish family in Kropyvnytskyi in Ukraine, Sclare completed an apprenticeship as an engineer. While there, he met a group of engineers from Scotland who were working on a Russian government contract, and they persuaded him to emigrate to Glasgow. Sclare arrived in 1889, and soon found work as a marine engineer. He joined the Amalgamated Society of Engineers, and soon served as secretary and then president of his branch.

Due to his socialist views and trade union activity, in 1906 Sclare was asked to become secretary of the Leeds Jewish Tailors', Machinists' and Pressers' Union. The previous secretary, Sam Freedman, had been sacked for stealing union funds, and the union was short of money. Within his first year, Sclare almost doubled membership to 900.

Sclare was elected to the executive of Leeds Trades Council, and as the union expanded, it offered many new facilities to members, including a Labour Hall, kosher food, burial, and prayer facilities. In both 1907 and 1908, he led strikes against piecework, both proving partially successful. A further strike in 1911 led to arbitration which improved the pay and conditions of the union's members, and membership had reached 4,500 by 1915. However, Sclare's ambition to open branches of the union in other cities proved unsuccessful. Instead, in 1915 he took it into a merger which formed the United Garment Workers' Trade Union (UTGWU).

Sclare was a member of Poale Zion, and his motions in support of political and civil rights for Jewish people were passed by the Trades Union Congress in 1915 and 1916. He chaired the Leeds branch of the Workers' League for Jewish Emancipation.

Sclare became the financial secretary of the UTGWU, and remained a leading figure after it merged into the National Union of Tailors and Garment Workers.

Trade union offices
Preceded by Sam Freedman	General Secretary of the Leeds Jewish Tailors', Machinists' and Pressers' Union; 1906–1915	Succeeded by Position abolished
