= United Kingdom Alliance of Organised Trades =

Former trade union of the United Kingdom

The UK Association of Organised Trades was founded in Sheffield in July 1866. It was an important predecessor organization to the Trades Union Congress.

The organisation was largely inspired by William Dronfield, who was elected as its secretary. It initially represented over 200,000 trade unionists, organised through trades councils or national unions. Among the attendees at the first conference were the London Working Men's Association, and George Odger of the London Trades Council.

The organisation agreed to secure mutual co-operation during lock-outs, to oppose the Master and Servant Act, and to work for the establishment of Courts of Conciliation and Arbitration. Its headquarters were established in Sheffield, and its executive was elected by the Sheffield Association of Organised Trades.

A second conference was held in Manchester in January 1867, and a third in Preston in September of that year, although by this point, it was in sharp decline.

The prospects for the organisation were essentially finished by the Sheffield Outrages. Although it condemned them, it soon emerged that William Broadhead, Treasurer of the Association, was their ringleader.

The organisation disbanded in 1871.

== See also ==
- History of trade unions in the United Kingdom
