= 1908 Dublin Corporation election =

Former city government election in Ireland

An election to Dublin Corporation took place in March 1908 as part of that year's Irish local elections. The election saw Sinn Féin emerge as the second largest party on the council, although it posed little risk to the Nationalists council dominance.

== Council composition following election ==
Party	Seats	±	Votes	%	±%
Irish Nationalist	55	▼10			
Sinn Féin	11	▲11			
Irish Unionist	9	▲1			
LEA	5	▼2			
Totals	80			100.0	—
