= F. C. Henry =

British activist and union leader

Frederick Charles Henry MBE (2 January 1906 – 2000) was a British socialist activist and trade union leader from Rochdale, Lancashire.

By the early 1930s, Henry was Financial Secretary of the Rochdale Trades Council, and editor of the Rochdale Labour News. He joined the Socialist League, a left-wing affiliate of the Labour Party, and served as its general secretary from January 1933 until July 1934.

Henry was elected to Rochdale Town Council, and became the leader of the Labour group on the council. He also became the full-time organising secretary of the Rochdale Trades Council. In 1939, he was appointed as the general secretary of the Waterproof Garment Workers' Trade Union (WGWTU).

Henry was made a Member of the Order of the British Empire in the 1951 Birthday Honours, and then an Officer of the Order of the British Empire in the 1966 New Year Honours. From 1959, he served on the management committee of the General Federation of Trade Unions, and he was its chair in 1968/69.

The waterproof garment industry was in long-term decline, and the WGWTU lost members throughout Henry's period leading the union. In 1972, he arranged for it to merge into the National Union of Tailors and Garment Workers, and then retired.

He died in 2000 in Blackpool, aged 94.

Party political offices
Preceded by New position	General Secretary of the Socialist League; 1933–1934	Succeeded by J. T. Murphy
Trade union offices
Preceded by Ted Ainley	General Secretary of the Waterproof Garment Workers' Trade Union; 1939–1972	Succeeded by Union merged
Preceded by Robert Doyle	Chair of the General Federation of Trade Unions; 1968–1969	Succeeded by Fred Hague
