= 1905 Dublin Corporation election =

Local election in Ireland

An election to Dublin Corporation took place in March 1905 as part of that year's Irish local elections. The election saw a small revival for Labour representatives, whilst the Unionist representation was cut by half.

== Council composition following election ==
Party	Seats	±	Votes	%	±%
Irish Nationalist	65	▲7			
Irish Unionist	8	▼8			
LEA	7	▲2			
Totals	80	Steady		100.0	—
