= Joseph Young (trade unionist) =

British trade union leader

Joseph Young (born 1858) was a British trade union leader.

Young worked in a clothing factory in Leeds. He was a founder member of the Leeds Wholesale Clothing Operatives' Union in 1889, and was elected as its first general secretary. Employers in Leeds announced that any members of the union would be blacklisted, but Young avoided this by recording membership in secret. Although the Factory Times complained that it should not have avoided confrontation in this way, the tactic proved successful, and by 1893 the union had more than 1,000 members.

From the start, Young had hoped to expand the union across the UK, and in 1894 he negotiated a merger with the Bristol Clothing Operatives' Union, forming the Amalgamated Union of Wholesale Clothing Operatives (AUCO). That year, the union announced a strike in opposition to wage cuts for pressers. Cutters, who were exempt from the cuts, opposed the strike action, and many resigned from the union. However, the action was backed by the Amalgamated Jewish Tailors', Machinists' and Pressers' Trade Union, and also by the new Independent Labour Party. The strike was resolved in May, but the union's finances were greatly depleted.

Under Young's leadership, the union continued to grow, and by 1900 it had fourteen branches across the country, and by 1915 this had grown to 36 branches, with a total of 12,000 members. That year, the AUCO merged into the United Garment Workers' Trade Union and, although Young was in poor health, he was elected as its secretary, serving until 1920, when it became part of the Tailor and Garment Workers' Union. Young became the treasurer of the new union. He also served on the management committee of the General Federation of Trade Unions, until at least 1927.

Trade union offices
Preceded by William N. Pitts	General Secretary of the Amalgamated Union of Clothiers Operatives; 1895–1915	Succeeded by Position abolished
Preceded by New position	General Secretary of the United Garment Workers' Trade Union; 1915–1920	Succeeded by Position abolished
