= Peter Shorrocks =

British trade union leader

Peter Shorrocks (8 April 1834 – 9 January 1886) was an early British trade union leader.

Born in Manchester, Shorrocks attended the Oldham Blue Coat School before following his father into the tailoring trade. Influenced by Chartism in his youth, Shorrocks was always involved in trade union activity, and in 1860 he joined the recently founded Manchester Society of Journeymen Tailors. The society suffered from low membership and a lack of funds; Shorrocks was elected as its secretary in 1863, and attempted to increase its activity.

In 1865, the Manchester Society tried to negotiate an agreed price list with employers, but faced hostility and was unable to reach agreement. Shorrocks organised a strike which quickly achieved most of the union's aims. Enthused by this, he called a national conference of local tailors' societies, held in Manchester in March 1866. The conference attracted a large number of delegates from around the UK, and the large majority formed the Amalgamated Society of Journeymen Tailors (ASJT), with Shorrocks as General Secretary. Shorrocks also negotiated an agreement to work in co-ordination with the rival London Operative Tailors' Association. He led the ASJT through a lock-out in Manchester in 1868, during which he was charged with conspiracy under the Combination of Workmen Act 1859, but was found not guilty.

In 1866, Shorrocks was a founder of the Manchester and Salford Trades Council (MSTC), and he supported W. H. Wood in calling the first Trades Union Congress (TUC), held in Manchester in 1868. He acted as the secretary of this first congress, also playing a prominent role in the 1869 congress, after which he was elected to the committee organised to put together a public statement of the TUC's resolutions. He attended most congresses until 1881, and served on the Parliamentary Committee of the TUC in 1873, the Standing Orders Committee from 1877 to 1879 and in 1881, and as vice-president in 1880.

During the late 1860s, Shorrocks was a supporter of the International Workingmen's Association, and was prominent in its Manchester and Salford branches, although neither existed long. He subsequently became associated with more mainstream Liberal-Labour positions.

Shorrocks was elected as secretary of the MSTC in 1877, serving until 1883, by which point he was in poor health. Despite this, he remained secretary of the ASJT until his death, early in 1886. One of his daughters later married T. A. Flynn, who served as General Secretary of the Tailors in the early 20th-century.

Trade union offices
Preceded by New position	General Secretary of the Amalgamated Society of Journeymen Tailors; 1866 – 1886	Succeeded by George Keir?
Preceded by Robert Knight and W. H. Packwood	Auditor of the Trades Union Congress; 1873; With: Henry Broadhurst	Succeeded by Henry Broadhurst and Philip Casey
Preceded by W. A. Coote and George Sedgwick	Auditor of the Trades Union Congress; 1882; With: George Sedgwick	Succeeded by James Millar Jack and Thomas Sharples
Preceded by William Henry Wood	Secretary of the Manchester and Salford Trades Council; 1877 – 1883	Succeeded by George Davy Kelley
