= William Henry Wood =

British trade union leader

William Henry Wood was a British trade union leader.

== Biography ==
Wood was a compositor, and became the Secretary of the Manchester Typographical Society, serving until 1879. In 1864, he was elected as the first Secretary of the Manchester Trades Council.

A keen trade unionist, Wood played a prominent role in two national union conferences: in Sheffield in 1866, and in London in 1867. With Samuel Caldwell Nicholson, he was inspired to create the Trades Union Congress (TUC), in frustration at the indifference of the Congress of the National Association for the Promotion of Social Science to trade union activities.

As Nicholson did not attend the first meeting of the TUC, Wood was elected as its first Secretary. He held the post for only one year, after which he was replaced by George Potter.

Trade union offices
Preceded by New position	Secretary of the Manchester and Salford Trades Council; 1866 – 1877	Succeeded by Peter Shorrocks
Preceded by New position	President of the Trades Union Congress; 1868	Succeeded by T. J. Wilkinson
Preceded by New position	Secretary of the Parliamentary Committee of the TUC; 1868–1869	Succeeded by George Potter
