= The Friends (play) =

Play by Arnold Wesker

The Friends is a play by Arnold Wesker, written in 1970. It was produced by the Stratford Festival in 1970.
