= T. A. Flynn =

Irish trade unionist

- Born: 1858; Ireland
- Died: 8 July 1925 (aged 66–67)
- Organizations: Amalgamated Society of Tailors and Tailoresses; Parliamentary Committee of the Trades Union Congress

Terence A. Flynn (1858 – 8 July 1925) was an Irish trade unionist.

Born in Ireland, Flynn began working at the age of twelve. He completed an apprenticeship as a tailor, then moved to Scotland to find work, and later on to London. While in London, he joined the Amalgamated Society of Journeymen Tailors, and gradually rose to prominence, taking a leading role in the strike of 1891. He married the daughter of Peter Shorrocks, first General Secretary of the union.

In 1893, Flynn was appointed as the union's London District Secretary, succeeding James MacDonald, and also took a place on the Executive Council. George Keir, the General Secretary of the union, died later in the year, and Flynn was elected to the vacant office. Under his leadership, the union began accepting women as members and changed its name to the Amalgamated Society of Tailors and Tailoresses. The union's membership increased, despite MacDonald leading a split in 1905.

While General Secretary, Flynn represented the union at the Trades Union Congress (TUC), and served on the Parliamentary Committee of the TUC in 1916/17. He died, still in office, in 1925.

Trade union offices
Preceded by George Keir	General Secretary of the Amalgamated Society of Tailors and Tailoresses; 1894 – 1925	Succeeded by Gurney Rowlerson
