= Ted Ainley =

British trade union leader and communist activist

General Secretary of the Association of Scientific Workers
- In office 1949–1951
- Preceded by: Roy Innes
- Succeeded by: Ben Smith

General Secretary of the Waterproof Garment Workers' Union
- In office 1937–1937
- Preceded by: Joseph Fogarty
- Succeeded by: F. C. Henry

Personal details
- Born: Theodore Abrahamson; October 3, 1903 Cheetham, United Kingdom
- Died: March 19, 1968 (aged 64) United Kingdom
- Party: Communist Party of Great Britain (1923–)
- Education: International Lenin School

Theodore Herzl Ainley (3 October 1903 – 19 March 1968) was a British trade union leader and communist activist.

== Life ==
Born Theodore Abrahamson in Cheetham, in Manchester, he was educated at a Jewish school, leaving when he was thirteen, to undertake an apprenticeship as a chemist. He soon left this, and instead found work making waterproof garments. In 1929, he changed his surname to "Ainley", a change which his brother, Ben, had made two years before.

Ted Ainley was influenced by Ben's socialism, and both Ted and his younger brother David became founder members of the Manchester Young Communist League (YCL) in 1922. Ted joined the Communist Party of Great Britain the following year, and also began working full-time for the YCL, as its organiser for North East England and Glasgow. He was elected to the National Executive of Committee of the YCL.

In September 1926, after the 1926 United Kingdom general strike, Ainley was sent to prison for 28 days for a breach of Emergency Regulations, which had been brought in ahead of the strike under the Emergency Powers Act 1920. They had been extended by Parliament. The charge was that Ainley had given a seditious speech,, likely to cause "disaffection among the civil population". It related to a speech Ainley had given on 25 August, at Ince-in-Makerfield, to an audience of around 500 colliers. A newspaper report stated that he spoke of police actions at Haydock and Ashton-in-Makerfield, and said violence must be met with violence.

In 1929, Ainley attended the Lenin School in Moscow. He returned to the UK and his former post in 1930, then in 1931 moved back to Manchester, and in 1932, on to London, where he took a post with the Daily Worker. This proved only short-term, and he returned again to Manchester, working at the Books and Books shop until it closed in 1935. He then returned to making waterproof clothing, joining the Waterproof Garment Workers' Union, and in 1937 he was elected as general secretary of the union. However, other figures in the union objected to his communism, and he was soon removed from office. He resigned from the union, and instead found work as an organiser for the Shop Assistants' Union.

In 1943, Ainley changed job again, becoming National Organiser for the Association of Scientific Workers. He won election as the union's general secretary in 1949, but took early retirement in 1951 due to poor health. He returned to working for the Communist Party, spending time as secretary of its Economic Committee, and then of its Cultural Committee. From 1957 until 1962, he was the editor of World News and Views, the party's weekly journal.

Trade union offices
Preceded by Joseph Fogarty	General Secretary of the Waterproof Garment Workers' Union; 1937	Succeeded by F. C. Henry
Preceded by Roy Innes	General Secretary of the Association of Scientific Workers; 1949–1951	Succeeded by Ben Smith
