= Lew Adams =

British trade unionist

Lewis Drummond Adams (born 16 August 1939) is a British former trade unionist.

Adams was educated at Impington Village College near Cambridge, then started his career with British Rail at the age of 15, working his way up to become a steam locomotive driver.

A local Associated Society of Locomotive Engineers and Firemen (ASLEF) trade union representative, Adams was voted in as General Secretary in 1994. Towards the right of the trade union political spectrum, he vigorously opposed the Conservative governments' privatisation of British Rail via the Railways Act 1993, and was attacked and labelled by the right wing tabloids, most famously as "The Black Prince of Militancy" by the Daily Mail during the 1995 rail strike. However, in 2004 Adams declared: "I was vehement that we wanted to stay in the public sector, and of course there were all the usual concerns trade unionists have regarding privatisation, safety issues, job losses, protecting the conditions of service, and pensions. But accepting the will of Parliament, it was time to look at the arguments. So we said to management, ‘Well, if that’s what you want, this is what we want.’ Today I cannot argue against the private entrepreneur coming into the rail industry. We are running 1,700 more trains per day since it was privatised. The entrepreneurs built traffic to the extent that we are having to build more infrastructure. What is true is true: 4.2 billion pounds spent on new trains. We never saw that in all the years I’ve been in the rail industry. All the time it was in the public sector, all we got were cuts, cuts, cuts. And today there are more members in the trade union, more train drivers, and more trains running. The reality is that it worked, we’ve protected jobs, and we got more jobs. If a private company is making more money, I look at that from a union's point of view, ‘Well, that looks like a wage increase to me.’ And we can argue that. And the more secure they are and the more productive they are in delivering train services, well, that means more jobs. I was there when the public railways had some 600,000 people and it came down to 100,000 in the time I worked in the rail industry. Now we are expanding on jobs.".

In 1998, Adams had a Class 87 locomotive named after him by Virgin Rail Group boss Richard Branson using the same "Black Prince" name, the first union secretary to have such an honour since former ASLEF secretary William P. Allen, General Secretary until 1947.

After being voted out of office in May 1998 to be replaced by left wing candidate Mick Rix, Adams joined Virgin Trains as a training manager. In 2003 Adams was campaign manager for right-wing candidate Shaun Brady's unexpectedly successful campaign to be elected ASLEF General Secretary, defeating the incumbent Rix. Brady was removed from office the following year after a bitter dispute with the union's Executive Committee.

Adams was later appointed to the Strategic Rail Authority set up by the new Labour government and is a board member of the British Transport Police.

Trade union offices
Preceded by Derrick Fullick	Assistant General Secretary of ASLEF; 1990 - 1993	Succeeded by Tony West
Preceded by Derrick Fullick	General Secretary of ASLEF; 1993 - 1998	Succeeded by Mick Rix
