= United Ladies Tailors' Trade Union =

The United Ladies' Tailors' Trade Union was a trade union representing tailors in London. Most of its members were Jewish, although all tailors were eligible to join.

The union was founded in 1907 as the London Ladies' Tailors', Machinists' and Pressers' Trade Union, but by 1911 had only 388 members. Given that the large majority of its members were Jewish, union business was conducted in Yiddish. In 1912, it grew enormously to have 3,235 members, thereafter remaining at roughly this level.

In 1919, Jacob Fine became general secretary of the union, and organised mergers with as many small ladies' tailors unions as possible. On the urging of the Trades Union Congress, it discussed a possible merger with the Amalgamated Society of Tailors and Tailoresses and the Tailors and Garment Workers Trade Union, but it decided against joining either union. However, in 1939 it did amalgamate with the National Union of Tailors and Garment Workers.

== General Secretaries ==
- Philip Kaplan
- Salve Josephs
- 1919: Jacob Fine
