= Laura Zucker =

American arts leader and educator (born 1950)

- Born: November 7, 1950 (age 75); New York City, U.S.
- Education: Barnard College (B.A. English); Yale School of Drama (attended, no degree)
- Occupation: Arts administrator · Consultant · Educator
- Organizations: Los Angeles County Department of Arts & Culture; Ventura Arts Council; Claremont Graduate University (Center for Business & Management of the Arts)
- Spouse: Allan Miller (m. 1976–present)

Laura Zucker (born 1950) is an American arts administrator, consultant, and educator. She served as executive director of the Los Angeles County Arts Commission from 1992 to 2017 and later directed the Center for Business & Management of the Arts at Claremont Graduate University.

== Early life and education ==
Laura Zucker was born in 1950 to film producer Nathan Zucker and Helen Zucker in New York City and grew up in New Rochelle, New York. She earned her Bachelor of Arts degree in English from Barnard College, and later attended the Yale School of Drama in 1972.

== Career ==
In the early to mid 1970s, Zucker was an actor, director, and acting coach in New York City. She moved to Los Angeles in 1974, where she continued to direct and coach.

Zucker was co-founder and producing director of the Back Alley Theatre for 10 years from 1979-1989. During that time, she served as chair of the Associated Theatres of Los Angeles (ATLAS), and participated in negotiations over the Los Angeles County Equity Waiver Plan. In 1991 she was appointed executive director of the Ventura Arts Council.

Zucker was the executive director of the Los Angeles County Arts Commission from 1992 to 2017. As executive director, she administered the county’s arts grant programs and participated in the development of county cultural policy. During her tenure, the commission developed arts-education programs involving 81 public school districts, a strategic plan for cultural equity and inclusion, and the California Cultural Tourism Initiative. Zucker oversaw the $80 million renovation of the Ford Theatres and the development of a paid undergraduate arts internship program with the Getty Trust.

Zucker served as executive producer of the county’s "Holiday Celebration" and was involved with programming at the Ford Theatres and the county’s free concert series. Following her tenure at the Arts Commission, she continued her work in the arts sector as an independent consultant and as a senior associate with AEA Consulting.

Zucker also was the Director of the Center for Business & Management of the Arts at Claremont Graduate University, where she taught courses on arts organization dynamics and cultural policy.

== Board memberships and honors ==
Zucker has served on various boards including the Music Man Foundation, Grantmakers in the Arts, the Association of Arts Administration Educators, ARTS Inc., and the Southern California Chapter of the International Women’s Forum. She was a founding board member of Arts for LA, which established the Laura Zucker Fellowship for Policy and Research in 2017. She was also a member of the Los Angeles Coalition for Jobs and the Economy.

Zucker received the Selina Roberts Ottum Award from Americans for the Arts in 2017.

== Personal life ==
Zucker has been married to actor and director Allan Miller since 1976. She lives in Sherman Oaks, California.
