= Scottish Operative Tailors' and Tailoresses' Association =

Trade union in Scotland

The Scottish Operative Tailors' and Tailoresses' Association was a trade union representing clothing workers in Scotland.

The union was established in the 1850s as the Scottish National Operative Tailors' Trade Protection Society, and in 1860 it became the Scottish National Association of Tailors. By 1867, it had 4,500 members in 84 branches, although these initially had a great deal of autonomy, and many of the union's activities were localised until the 1890s. Already in the 1860s, its secretary and the editor of its journal worked full-time for the union, while its treasurer and president each received £12 per year.

Initially, the union campaigned for shorter working hours, the same pay for the same work among different employers, spreading work among members during times of recession, and for employers to allow piecework. It had some success, obtaining a 15% increase in wages and a 57-hour working week, but a strike for a uniform manner of logging time worked was unsuccessful; a 57-week strike in Aberdeen in 1875 also failed.

The Amalgamated Society of Journeymen Tailors and the London Operative Tailors' Association proposed a merger with the Scottish Tailors, but the union rejected this, believing it was better to have a union able to deal specifically with Scottish employers. Membership of the union gradually fell to 2,500, and remained at this level through the 1870s and 1880s, only recovering to over 4,000 in the mid-1890s. While this membership remained concentrated among the best paid tailors, it had also begun to recruit skilled workers in clothing factories.

In 1900, the union admitted its first nineteen women members, and became the Scottish Amalgamated Society of Tailors and Tailoresses, but despite the name change, very few women were admitted, and in 1910 only five women held membership. In 1903, the union suffered a significant defeat, with employers thereafter refusing union officials the right to enter workshops, and began employing temporary workers in any number they desired.

The union merged with the United Garment Workers' Trade Union in 1920, forming the Tailors' and Garment Workers' Trade Union, against the opposition of its general secretary, A. C. Craig.

== General Secretaries ==
1880s: Neil McLean
1895: Robert Girvan
c.1918: A. C. Craig
