= Jack Munro =

British trade unionist

William James Munro (1873 – 12 January 1948) was a British trade unionist.

== Early life ==
Born to British parents in India, Munro's father served in the British Indian Army, and Munro lived there until he was twelve. The family then moved to Manchester, and Munro found work with the Midland Railway Company. Three years later, he undertook an apprenticeship as a sheet metal worker, joining the Manchester Society of Braziers and Sheet Metal Workers.

== Involvement in Politics and Unions ==
Munro became interested in socialism, and was an early member of the Independent Labour Party, and later also the Openshaw Socialist Society. Through this, he came to know George Peet and Harry Pollitt. He also joined the Plebs League. He and Jim Crossley were the Socialist Society's two delegates to the 1911 Socialist Unity Conference, which founded the British Socialist Party, and he later followed the party into forming the Communist Party of Great Britain (CPGB).

Munro worked at Crossley Motors during World War I, becoming a shop steward, taking a leading role in the city's shop stewards movement, and a 1917 strike at the factory. After the war, he was a founder of the Manchester Labour College, at which he tutored in several subjects. He also remained active in his trade union, representing it at the 1920 conference which led to the formation of the National Union of Sheet Metal Workers and Braziers, and serving on that union's first executive committee. He frequently stood to become president of the union, finally winning it in 1930/31.

Munro was also active in the Manchester and Salford Trades Council, becoming a delegate in 1920, vice president in 1922/23, president in 1924/5, and treasurer from 1926. That year, he resigned from the CPGB, unhappy that it had criticised leaders of the Trades Union Congress during the UK general strike. In 1936, he was elected as secretary of the trades council, aligning himself with the Labour Party and becoming increasingly opposed to the CPGB. He retired in 1944, after suffering increasingly poor health.

Trade union offices
Preceded by A. A. Purcell	Secretary of the Manchester and Salford Trades Council; 1936–1944	Succeeded by Horace Newbould
