= Allan Miller =

American actor (born 1929)

- Born: February 14, 1929 (age 97)
- Occupations: Actor, director, acting teacher, author, playwright
- Years active: 1956–present
- Spouses: Anita Cooper (divorced); Laura Zucker (m. 1976)
- Children: 2

Allan Miller (born February 14, 1929) is an American stage, film, and television actor.

== Biography ==
Miller served in the U.S. Army after World War II during the occupation of Japan. Noticing an ad in Stars and Stripes that was looking for performers, he began performing in shows to entertain the troops.

In 1948, after Miller returned to the U.S., he attended Erwin Piscator's Dramatic Workshop at The New School for Social Research in New York. He then studied acting under Uta Hagen (his classmates included Geraldine Page and Charles Nelson Reilly); and under Lee Strasberg at the Actors Studio (his classmates included James Dean, Marilyn Monroe, and Paul Newman). In 1958, under Strasberg's sponsorship, he began teaching at the Dramatic Workshop. In 1960, he started teaching privately; one of his students was a teenaged Barbra Streisand. In the 1970s he taught at Yale Drama School.

He is best known for his appearances on television, including Kojak, The Rockford Files, The Streets of San Francisco, Hawaii Five-O, Wonder Woman, Dallas, and The Paper Chase. His film career included roles in Baby Blue Marine (1976), Two-Minute Warning (1976), Fun with Dick and Jane (1977), Star Trek III: The Search for Spock (1984) and Brewster's Millions (1985). He has performed on stages across the country and on Broadway, most notably in Brooklyn Boy. He was producing director of the Back Alley Theatre, which he created and ran with his wife, Laura Zucker, from 1979 to 1989. He was also one of the primary plaintiffs in a landmark lawsuit between Actors' Equity Association and Los Angeles-based small theaters, focused on the Equity Waiver Plan.

He is the author of the book, A Passion for Acting, and a DVD, Auditioning. He wrote the play, The Fox, based on the D.H. Lawrence novella, which was produced in Los Angeles, Off-Broadway at the Roundabout Theatre in New York City, and continues to be produced in the United States and around the world.

== Personal life ==
Miller has been married twice. His first wife was actress Anita Cooper, now deceased. In 1976 he remarried, to Laura Zucker, who for 25 years was executive director of the Los Angeles County Arts Commission.

== Filmography ==
- One Life to Live (1968-72 ABC TV Serial) - Dave Siegel
- The Rockford Files (1975) - Michael Cordeen
- Baby Blue Marine (1976) - Capt. Bittman
- Two-Minute Warning (1976) - Mr. Green
- Victory at Entebbe (1976) - Nathan Haroun
- Fun with Dick and Jane (1977) - Loan Company Manager
- MacArthur (1977) - Colonel Diller
- Hawaii Five-O (1977) "Shake Hands with the Man on the Moon" - Frank Devlin
- The Champ (1979) - Whitey
- Cruising (1980) - Chief of Detectives
- Star Trek III: The Search for Spock (1984) - Alien
- Brewster's Millions (1985) - Political Newscaster
- Blacke's Magic (1986) "Wax Poetic" - Donald Rush
- Warlock (1989) - Detective
- Second Chances (1998) - Dr. Rasmussen
- Bad Words (2013) - Bald Glasses Judge
