= Derrick Fullick =

Derrick Frank Fullick (9 January 1929 – 2020) was a British trade union leader.

Fullick began working on the railways in 1944, then in 1947 undertook National Service. By his 24th birthday, he was back on the railways and had been promoted to become an engine driver. He joined the Associated Society of Locomotive Engineers and Firemen (ASLEF), becoming part of its Waterloo Nine Elms branch, and was elected to the union's executive committee in 1973.

In 1982, Fullick was elected as president of ASLEF, seen by its membership as committed to its dispute over rostering, although he was unable to gain the backing of the Trades Union Congress. He served until 1990, when he became assistant general secretary of the union, then won election as general secretary, serving until 1993.

Trade union offices
Preceded by Bill Ronksley	President of the Associated Society of Locomotive Engineers and Firemen; 1982 - 1987	Succeeded by Willie O'Brien
Preceded by Neil Milligan	Assistant General Secretary of the Associated Society of Locomotive Engineers and Firemen; 1987 - 1990	Succeeded by Lew Adams
Preceded by Neil Milligan	General Secretary of the Associated Society of Locomotive Engineers and Firemen; 1990 - 1993	Succeeded by Lew Adams
