= Stuart Uttley =

British trade unionist

Stuart Uttley (1837 – 27 November 1911) was a British trade unionist.

Born in Sheffield, Uttley became an apprentice file cutter at the age of fifteen. In 1869, he left the trade to work at the Atlas Steel Works, but when the economy picked up, he returned to file cutting, became active in the Sheffield Hand File Cutters Society, and was elected as its general secretary in 1877. Through this, he also became active on the Sheffield Federated Trades Council, and served as its secretary from 1883.

Uttley represented the Sheffield Trades Council at the Trades Union Congress (TUC), and served on the Parliamentary Committee of the TUC in 1886, and again in 1889. At the TUC, he championed high quality industrial work, and proposed that marks were introduced so that the country of manufacture of items could be determined; this led to the introduction of trademarks through the Merchandise Marks Act 1887 (50 & 51 Vict. c. 28).

Uttley's interest in working-class representation in politics led him to stand for Sheffield Town Council as a Liberal-Labour candidate. He was elected for the St Philip's ward in 1886, and persuaded the council to introduce the country's first "fair contracts" clause. He also championed the municipalisation of the city's tramways, against the wishes of many other Liberals on the council.

Uttley was opposed to more radical political movements, outside the Liberal Party. At the 1885 general election, he was critical of Mervyn Hawkes, candidate of the United Committee of Radical and Labour Organisations, claiming that Lib-Lab candidate Samuel Plimsoll "represented the great majority of working men electors". In 1886, he became a representative of the Labour Electoral Association's Midland district. When the Independent Labour Party (ILP) emerged in the 1890s, Uttley remained strongly supportive of the Liberals, although he tried to use ILP support on the trades council to persuade the local Liberals to put forward more Lib-Lab candidates.

In 1907, Uttley stood down from his trade union roles, taking a post on the council of the Hearts of Oak Friendly Society. When the TUC visited Sheffield in 1910, he was seated on the platform as an honoured visitor.

Trade union offices
Preceded by ?	Secretary of the Sheffield Federated Trades Council; 1883 – 1907	Succeeded by Robert Holmshaw
