= Sheffield Trades and Labour Council =

Labour organisation in Sheffield, England

Sheffield Trades Union Council
- Predecessor: United Trades of Sheffield
- Founded: 1858
- Headquarters: Trades and Labour Club, Talbot Street, Sheffield
- Location: England
- Website: sheffieldtuc.co.uk

The Sheffield Trades and Labour Council, usually known as the Sheffield Trades Council, is a labour organisation uniting trade unionists in Sheffield.

== Precursors ==
The earliest recorded attempt to found an alliance of trade unions in the city is the "Sheffield Mechanical Trades Association", created in 1822 to bring together six cutlery trades. In 1830, a "Trades General Union" was created, with the aim of uniting workers and works owners; this dissolved the following year.

From the mid-1830s, there were occasional meetings open to all trade unionists in the town. Around 1838, an "Alliance of Organised Trades" was formed, producing the first permanent trades council-style body in Sheffield. This decided not to offer evidence into the Government inquiry into trade unions, and also voted against 20-12 against joining the Chartists, although it did actively oppose the Corn Laws.

In 1843, the Alliance formed the "United Trades Union", but this undertook little activity and dissolved in 1847 after the Table Knife Hafters Society borrowed £750 of its funds, then withdrew without repaying the loan.

The Alliance was re-constituted in 1844 to counter a new employers' organisation. The new group, also known as the "United Trades of Sheffield" elected John Drury, leader of the Razor Grinders as its Secretary. He persuaded Thomas Duncombe to become the President of a new National Association of United Trades for the Protection of Labour, but neither body had proved lasting. A large debt was left following the groups' collapse, and fear of inheriting this discouraged the formation of a replacement organisation for some years.

== Foundation ==
The organisation originated in 1858, when many Sheffield compositors were involved in a dispute with S. Harrison, owner of the Sheffield Times newspaper, who wished to reduce their wages. When members of the Journeyman Printers' Society refused to accept the reduced terms, Harrison recruited non-union labour from London and attempted to prevent any of his remaining workers belonging to a union. The union branch printed a statement, "The Press Trampling on the Rights of Labour", in response to which, Harrison took up proceedings for libel, claiming £2,000 in damages.

Charles Bagshaw, the local secretary of the Razor Smiths' Union, attempted to bring the parties together for conciliation, but Harrison refused this. In response to his threat of litigation, a meeting of local trade unions was held in Sheffield's Town Hall on 10 November 1858. The meeting, chaired by George Calvert Holland, passed a resolution calling for the foundation of a local trades council. A committee was appointed to this end, which also managed to get Harrison to withdraw the charges against the printers. The committee called a series of further meetings, which finally agreed its rules and the title of Association of Organised Trades of Sheffield and Neighbourhood on 22 June 1859. Although not the first trades council, only Glasgow Trades Council can claim a longer continuous history.

In September, the compositors' leader William Dronfield was elected as the trades council's first Secretary, a post he held until 1867; Charles Bagshaw became the first President, and William Broadhead the Treasurer. Robert Applegarth, George Austin and Joseph Rolley were also elected to the Executive. The new organisation declared itself dedicated to "the establishment and perpetuation of a more intimate relation between all branches of the operative classes, and giving increased efficiency to the operation of trade societies." In the first instance, it saw itself as an impartial arbiter of industrial relations, and where arbitration failed, as a supporter of its branches. The arbitration saw successes in various trades, in Sheffield, Rotherham and Hathersage.

The membership was mostly of unions based in the cutlery trade. On formation, there were 17 branches, with 3,100 members, while by February 1860, twenty-two societies had joined, representing 3,536 workers. A recession hit trade from 1861, and membership then fell, to a low of around 2,400 in 1863.

The Association actively supported the London Builders' Strike of 1859–60, which brought about the foundation of the London Trades Council. It also supported a Bill to create courts for compulsory arbitration, working closely with Sheffield's Members of Parliament, George Hadfield and John Arthur Roebuck.

== UK Alliance and the Sheffield Outrages ==
In 1864, the grinders' union issued a wage claim. This was ignored, and when a new claim the following year was also passed over, they joined with the smiths' union, the largest in the town, in calling a strike in February 1866. Some large employers retaliated by installing file cutting machines. The Association's attempt to mediate failed, and the employers rejected a compromise. In order to bolster the strike, the Association appealed for funds from trades in other areas of the country, and having received some, it agreed a proposal from the Wolverhampton Trades Council to hold a national conference. The strike was lost in June, but the conference went ahead.

Dronfield invited delegates from across Britain to Sheffield on 17 July 1866. 138 attended, representing around 200,000 members. The meeting resolved to found a national organisation of trade unions, the United Kingdom Alliance of Organised Trades. Most of its Executive Council came from the Sheffield area, and its executive was the same as that of the Sheffield Association.

A series of violent attacks on non-trade unionists by a small minority of unionist, the "Sheffield Outrages", ran through 1866, so in November, the trades council joined with the London Trades Council to call for a government enquiry. The Association formed a Trade Union Defence Committee, led by George Austin.

At the 1868 general election, Dronfield had on behalf of the trades council persuaded Anthony John Mundella to stand in the Sheffield constituency, believing that the Liberal would act in the interests of Labour. However, some dissident trade unionists, including Broadhead, supported John Arthur Roebuck and the Conservative E. P. Price instead, on the grounds that they claimed to support a closed shop policy backed by law. Mundella and George Hadfield, the other official Liberal candidate, proved successful.

== Federated Trades Council ==
The repercussions of the Outrages left the Association moribund, but in October 1872 the trades council reconstituted itself as the Sheffield Federated Trades Council, with William Rolley as Chairman, James Pryor as Secretary and Edward Memmott as Treasurer. The following year, the organisation sent delegates to the national Trades Union Congress, and in 1874 it hosted the event at Sheffield's Temperance Hotel.

For the remainder of the century, the organisation focussed on promoting itself as an arbitrator in trade disputes and preventing wares being falsely stamped. While it had limited success in arbitration, Stuart Uttley's campaigns on stamping brought about the Merchandise Marks Act 1887 (50 & 51 Vict. c. 28).

In 1885, the leaders of the Trades Council formed the Sheffield Labour Association to campaign for the election of workers to public bodies as members of the Liberal Party. Memmott, Uttley, Charles Hobson and William F. Wardley were all elected to Sheffield Town Council as Lib-Labs. However, Hobson was rejected as a Lib-Lab candidate for the Sheffield Attercliffe by-election, 1894. Although the Executive of the Trades Council drew up an electoral agreement with the Liberal selected, a delegate meeting instead voted to support the Independent Labour Party (ILP) candidate.

Membership of the Trades Council reached 16,000 by 1892, and by this point, a majority of its affiliated membership worked in the heavy trades. Hobson and Uttley were elected to the national Industrial Union of Employers and Employed in 1895, but this organisation soon dissolved.

The Trades Council affiliated to the Labour Representation Committee, but did not agree to the foundation of a local organisation until 1903. In 1904, this became the "Sheffield Trades Council and Labour Representation Committee", an auxiliary of the Trades Council, with the Building Trades Federation, the ILP and the Sheffield Socialist Society also represented. While this Committee dropped "Trades Council" from its name again the following year, its promotion of labour candidates independent from the Liberal Party increasingly brought it into conflict with the Federated Trades Council. The Committee became the Sheffield Trades and Labour Council in June 1908, severing all links with the Federated Trades Council.

== 1910s and 20s ==
Many of the lighter trades remained with the Federated Trades Council, the heavier trades mostly affiliated solely to the new organisation. A few groups remained affiliated to both Trades Councils; for example, Hobson remained President of the Federated, but also held membership of the Trades and Labour.

The ILP disaffiliated from the Trades and Labour in 1910, after local ILP leader Alf Barton proposed to stand as a local election candidate without the sanction of the Trades Council. However, Barton left the ILP soon after to form a local branch of the British Socialist Party, and the ILP reaffiliated the following year.

At the start of World War I, both Trades Councils supported Army recruitment campaigns, but from 1916, the Trades and Labour opposed the war. In 1917, it passed a motion congratulating the Russian people on the February Revolution, and in December, another congratulating "the Socialist Proletariat of Russia on their present achievement (i.e. the Bolshevik Revolution) and wishing them success in their endeavour to build up a real Socialist Commonwealth". A strong shop stewards' movement, with J. T. Murphy a leading figure, and a wave of strikes strengthened the position of the Trades and Labour. In 1920, it protested against the Labour Party's refusal to permit the Communist Party of Great Britain (CPGB) to affiliate.

By 1920, the Trades and Labour represented almost 60,000 workers. The Federated's membership had not grown, and remained at around 15,000. It also remained a far less radical organisation, and had readily joined the Alliance of Employers and Employees. After many attempts to reunite the two, they finally reunited in July 1920 as the Sheffield Federated Trades and Labour Council, under the Presidency of Gertrude Wilkinson.

During the 1920s, the Trades Council was prominent in supporting strikers, such as during the engineering lockout of 1922, and measures to benefit the large numbers of unemployed workers. It also published Sheffield Forward, and provided a twenty-four-hour Central Committee to organise the city's workers during the General Strike.

== Later years ==
The organisation continued to move to the left, and was threatened with disaffiliation by Labour in 1940, after it passed a motion welcoming the Soviet invasion of Poland. This threat was lifted after President C. S. Darvill, who had been expelled from the Labour Party, was removed from office. Communist Party of Great Britain (CPGB) members were then banned from participating on the council, but the ban was finally lifted in 1969.

In 1973, the city Labour Party was split from the Trades Council, against the organisation's opposition. Despite this, the two continued to print a joint annual report, shared a president and staff, and worked closely together. Two years later, the Trades Council affiliated to the Labour Party.

As of 2017, Sheffield Trades and Labour Council's Secretary was Martin Mayer and its President was Bob Jeffery.

== Secretaries ==
- 1859: William Dronfield
- 1872: James Pryor
- 1874: ?
- 1883: Stuart Uttley
- 1908: R. Holmshaw
- 1919: Moses Humberstone
- 1920: C. H. Miller
- 1924: Tom Garnett
- 1932: T. E. Eaton
- 1936: A. E. Hobson
- 1954: Ronald Evers
- 1957: Vernon M. Thornes
- 1981: Roger Barton
- 1989: Bill Ronksley
- 2011: Martin Mayer
