= The Merchant (play) =

1976 play by Arnold Wesker

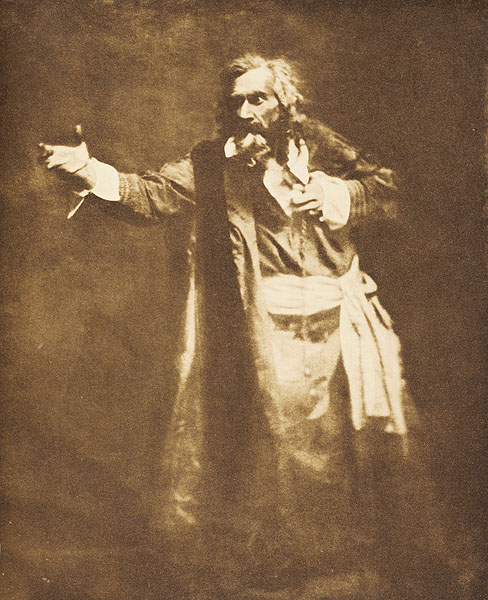
Shylock - a Study by Joseph Keiley

The Merchant is a 1976 play in two acts by the English dramatist Arnold Wesker. It is based on William Shakespeare's The Merchant of Venice, and focuses on the Jewish Shylock character, that play's principal antagonist.

Wesker began writing the play after seeing a 1973 performance by Laurence Olivier. It premiered in Stockholm in 1976 and was later renamed Shylock.

A Broadway production was planned for fall 1977, with Zero Mostel in the lead, following a pre-Broadway tryout at the Forrest Theatre in Philadelphia and the Kennedy Center in Washington, D.C. John Dexter served as director. The production played one preview on Friday, September 2, 1977, after which Mostel fell ill and was taken to the hospital. Performances were canceled until he could return, however Mostel died on September 8 from cardiac arrest.

The remainder of the Philadelphia engagement of The Merchant was canceled. The production played the Kennedy Center's Eisenhower Theatre, with Mostel's understudy, Joseph Leon, in the leading role of Shylock Kolner. Previews began on September 28, the play opened on September 30 and closed November 5.

The Merchant moved to Broadway, beginning previews on November 9 and opening on November 16 at the Plymouth Theatre. The play did not receive favorable reviews and closed on November 19, following eight previews and five performances. The production lost an estimated $650,000.

In addition to Leon, the Broadway company featured John Clements as Antonio Querini, Roberta Maxwell as Portia Contarini, Marian Seldes as Rivka Kolner, Julie Garfield as Jessica Kolner, Gloria Gifford as Nerissa, Everett McGill as Lorenzo Pisani, Nicolas Surovy as Bassanio Visconti, Riggs O'Hara as Graziano Sanudo, and John Seitz as Tubal di Ponti.

Wesker wrote a book about the challenge of mounting play in 1999, The Birth of Shylock and the Death of Zero Mostel. The book mostly pulls from the diary Wesker kept at the time.

In this play, Shylock is a good man and the good friend of Antonio, the title character in Shakespeare's play. They bond in their love of knowledge and mutual dislike of the antisemitism in their community. Shylock's demand for a pound of flesh is meant as a jest, but he cannot retract it. Both Shylock and Antonio are relieved when the demand is denied in court.

Reviewing The Merchant, critic Michael Billington wrote "Wesker’s point comes across clearly: that anti-Jewish prejudice is ingrained in English life." John Gross, another critic, stated that "As a humanistic sermon, The Merchant has much to recommend it. As a play, it lacks bite".

== See also ==
- Shylock, a play by Mark Leiren-Young
