= Bill Ronksley =

English trade unionist (1924–2018)

William Ronksley (7 May 1924 – 6 November 2018) was an English trade unionist.

Born in Dungworth near Sheffield, Ronksley's family were tenant farmers but were evicted when his father was declared bankrupt during the Great Depression. Ronksley worked for a butcher and then delivering telegrams, before becoming a messenger for the London and North Eastern Railway at Bridgehouses railway station. In 1941, Ronksley became a locomotive cleaner, and joined the Associated Society of Locomotive Engineers and Firemen (ASLEF). He was promoted to become a fireman and then a driver.

Ronskely joined the Communist Party of Great Britain, in which role he met Pablo Picasso at Sheffield railway station in 1950.

In 1954, Ronksley became district secretary of ASLEF, and then in 1963 was elected to the union's executive, representing the northern part of British Rail's eastern region. In 1974, he was elected as the union's president, serving until 1982. He remained district secretary, in which role he strongly supported the 1984–1985 United Kingdom miners' strike. He was in the Soviet Union during the Chernobyl disaster, following which he appeared on Soviet television to reassure viewers.

After retiring from the railways, Ronksley became secretary of Sheffield Trades Council and was an interviewee for Ken Loach's film The Spirit of '45. He was also a key supporter of Wortley Hall. In his honour, the Yorkshire and Humber region of the Trades Union Congress gives the annual Bill Ronksley Award for the Young Trade Unionist of the Year.

Trade union offices
Preceded by Les Feltham	President of ASLEF; 1974–1982	Succeeded by Derrick Fullick
Preceded by Roger Barton	Secretary of the Sheffield Trades and Labour Council; 1989–2011	Succeeded by Martin Mayer
