= William Broadhead =

British trade unionist and instigator of The Sheffield Outrages

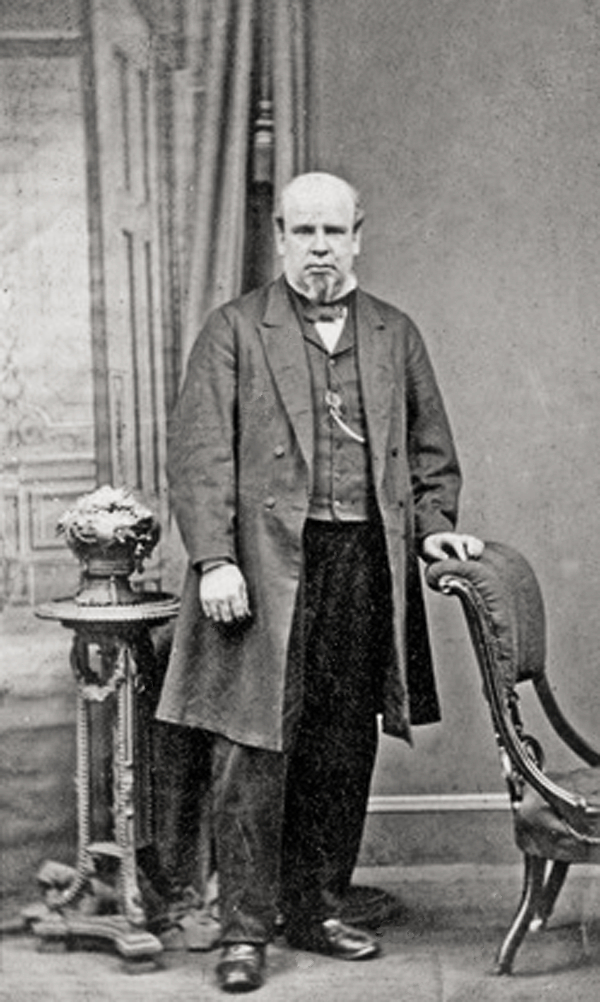
William Broadhead

William Broadhead was a British trade unionist and saw grinder, and instrumental in the Sheffield Outrages.

== Early life ==
Born in Whirlow, Sheffield on 2 October 1815, Broadhead worked as a saw grinder with his father from childhood.

== Career ==
Broadhead became the landlord of a public house called The Bridge in Owlerton. He used his income from this business to support saw grinders who found themselves in difficulties, and as a result, was elected General Secretary of the Saw Grinders Union in 1848. Under his leadership, the union grew in power, raising money for its members, and disrupting the work of non-union members.

This disruption took several forms, including damaging equipment, sending threatening letters, and even bombings and shootings. Broadhead avoided personal involvement in this intimidation, and was able to occupy a prominent position in trade union politics. He was elected to an office in the first Sheffield Association of Organised Trades in 1858, then became its Treasurer in 1859, before being made Treasurer of the United Kingdom Alliance of Organised Trades in 1866.

=== Sheffield Outrages ===
The union's actions against unorganised labour came to national attention, and became known as the Sheffield Outrages. Broadhead denied all knowledge, and offered a reward for information. In November 1866, the Sheffield Association and the London Trades Council asked Parliament to investigate. Most union members, including Broadhead, were given certificates of immunity, so although Broadhead ultimately confessed to ordering a murder and various other crimes to be committed, he was not convicted. He remained with the union, but was refused his publican's licence. To avoid public attention, he emigrated to the United States in 1869, but returned the following year to start a new career as a grocer.

== Later life and death ==
Broadhead had a number of strokes after 1876 and died at his home of 114 Meadow Street, Sheffield on 15 March 1879. He was buried at All Saints' parish churchyard, Ecclesall, on 20 March 1879.

== Personal life ==
He married Mary Jane Wildgoose at Sheffield Cathedral on 2 April 1836 with whom he would go on to have nine children.

== In popular culture ==
In Charles Reade's novel Put yourself in his Place (1870), the character of Grotait is based on Broadhead.
