= E4 School of Performing Arts =

- Genre: Talent show
- Voices of: Brian Blessed
- Country of origin: United Kingdom
- Original language: English
- No. of series: 1
- No. of episodes: 6

Production
- Running time: 60 minutes (inc. adverts)
- Production company: Silver River

Original release
- Network: E4
- Release: 3 October – 7 November 2007

E4 School of Performing Arts is a talent show that aired on E4 from 3 October to 7 November 2007 and is narrated by Brian Blessed. The show consisted of RADA's former head of acting, Jennie Buckman, and LAMDA teacher Aaron Mullen "sharing their expertise with aspiring actors" for the show.
