= Samuel Caldwell Nicholson =

British trade unionist

Samuel Caldwell Nicholson (died 1891) was a British trade unionist.

Nicholson was a compositor who became the Treasurer of the Manchester Typographical Society. In 1864, he was elected the first President of the Manchester and Salford Trades Council. After hearing from William Dronfield, Secretary of the Sheffield Typographical Society, of the lack of interest in trade union matters at the Congress of the National Association for the Promotion of Social Science, Nicholson proposed forming a Trades Union Congress (TUC).

Nicholson was also General Secretary of the Annual Moveable Delegation of the Order of Druids, and this event clashed with the first TUC conference, so he was unable to attend.
