= Manchester Trades Union Council =

History of the Trades Union Council

Manchester TUC
- Manchester Trades Union Council
- Founded: 1868 at Mechanics' Institute, Manchester
- Headquarters: Mechanics' Institute, Manchester
- Location: England
- Members: 18,000 (2016)
- Key people: President - Alexander Davidson (PCS); Secretary - Chris Marks (PCS); Vice President - John Clegg (Unite)
- Affiliations: Greater Manchester County Association of Trades Councils

The Manchester Trades Union Council brings together trade union branches in Manchester in England.

== History ==
Efforts to bring trade unionists together across Manchester go back to the eighteenth century. In 1818 the cotton spinners persuaded other trades to join them in a successful but short lived Philanthropic Society. The first use of the name Trades Council was a meeting in 1837 of the United Trades Council of Manchester and Salford organising support for the Glasgow Cotton Spinners. A thousand people in the Corn Exchange listened to speakers including J.R. Richardson, author of ‘The Rights of Women’ and Joseph Rayner Stephens, both of whom went on to be active Chartists.

Following a trade union conference in Sheffield in July 1866 called to discuss the use of the lockout weapon by employers, two delegates from the Manchester Typographical Association, William Henry Wood and Samuel Caldwell Nicholson, convened the inaugural meeting of the Manchester and Salford Trades Union Council in October 1866. A month later Wood was elected secretary and Nicholson president. Wood and Nicholson were Conservative working men. Other members of the council included the radicals Peter Shorrocks of the Tailors, William MacDonald of the Operative Housepainters and Malcolm MacLeod, an engineer. When the Council decided to avoid identifying with any political movement, the radicals set up the Trade Unionists Political Association with MacDonald as president and MacLeod as secretary. One of the Trades Council's first decisions was the proposal to form a court of arbitration. Set up jointly with the Manchester Chamber of Commerce in 1868, it was short-lived, failing to arbitrate a single case. More significantly in February that year, the council called a national conference of trade unionists which met in June and agreed to form what became the Trades Union Congress. Woods was elected president and Shorrocks secretary. This soon became the leading national association of trade unions.

Peter Shorrocks played a leading role in establishing the Amalgamated Society of Tailors and was an active supporter of the International Workingmen's Association, the First International. He succeeded Wood to be secretary from 1877 to 1883. He was followed as secretary by George Davy Kelley, full-time secretary of the Amalgamated Society of Lithographic Printers and a member of the General Council of the Manchester Liberal Association. Kelley helped to greatly increase affiliations to the council. Many of the new affiliations were general unions of unskilled workers, a development which Kelley opposed as he felt the organisations would not endure, but they soon came to dominate the council. Despite this, Kelley remained the council's most prominent figure, being elected to Manchester City Council in 1891 as a Liberal-Labour representative.

In 1902, the council convened a meeting of local trade unionists and members of the Independent Labour Party and Social Democratic Federation, which renamed the council as the Manchester Trades and Labour Council, becoming the local affiliate of the Labour Representation Committee. Two years later, Kelley broke his links with the Liberals, and in 1906 he was elected as a Labour Member of Parliament, standing down from his trades council posts.

In the 1920s, the council affiliated to the Communist Party of Great Britain-led National Minority Movement. Although the Labour Party set up its own Manchester Borough organisation, the council continued to campaign on a wide range of labour issues, remaining the leading labour movement organisation in the city into the 1930s, and attracted the support of John Maynard Keynes for its proposals on local industrial policy.

In 1974, Salford District Trades Council was created, and the Manchester Trades Union Council adopted its present name.

== Secretaries ==
1866: William Henry Wood
1877: Peter Shorrocks

1883: George Davy Kelley
1906: Tom Fox
1909: William R. Mellor
1929: A. A. Purcell
1935: Jack Munro
1944: Horace Newbold
1969: Colin Davis
1974: Frances Dean
1982: Dave Hawkins - UHDE
1990: Arthur Berry - NGA
1999 Jeno Menezes
2004 Geoff Brown - UCU
2012 Frank Ellis - TSSA
2013 Richard Lighten - UNISON
2014 Alexander Davidson - PCS
2016: Chris Marks - PCS
2018: Alexander Davidson - GMB
2019: John Pye - UNISON
2020: John Pye - UNISON
2025: John Pye - UNISON
2026: John Pye - UNISON

== Presidents ==
1866: Samuel Caldwell Nicholson
1882: Robert Austin
1886: Matthew Arrandale - UMW
1895: F. Entwistle - ASE
1899: George Tabbron - Manchester Brassfounders
1901: Matthew Arrandale - UMW
1905: A. A. Purcell - NAFTA
1906:
Tom Fox
1914: A. A. Purcell - NAFTA
1920: Rhys Davies - SAU
1921: Ernest Hookway
1924: Jack Munro (NUSMW)
1925: Ernest Hookway
1927: Will Crick
1927: Eric Gower
1932: Abraham Moss - RCA
1935: Fred Harrison - NSMM
1938: Bob Bradfield
1940: Tom Brown - NAUSAWC
1944: Jim Porter - USDAW
1946: Jim Cunnick - USDAW
1950: Edmund Dell - ASSET
1951: Jim Porter - USDAW
1953: L. H. Addie - CSCA
1954: Jim Cunnick
1957: Jim Porter - USDAW
1959: Edmund Dell - ASSET
1961: Eddie Marsden - CEU
1964: Ernest Pearson - AEU
1967: Eddie Marsden - CEU
1969: C. Davies
1970: Frances Dean - USDAW
1975: Mick Gadian - NUTGW
1978: M. Bury
1980: T. Keane
1982: Denis Maher - CEU
1988: Tony Lucas - MU
1989: Henry Suss - GMB Clothing and Textile Section
1991: Harry Spooner - NASUWT
2004: Sharon Green - PCS
2013: Annette Wright - PCS
2017: Alexander Davidson - PCS
2018: Annette Wright - PCS
2019: Ian Allinson - Unite
2020: Ian Allinson - Unite
2025: Chris Neville - Unite
2026: Chris Neville - Unite

== Vice Presidents ==
1945/46/47: Frances Dean
1948/49: E Pearson
1950:P Jackson
1951: J Porter
1952:P Jackson
1955/56: J Porter
1957/58: E Dell
1959/60: E Marsden
1961/62/63: E Pearson
1964/65/66: E Marsden
1967/68: C Davies
1969/70: A Harvey
1973/74:S Gadian
1977/78/79: F Hodgkinson
1980/81:D Maher
1982/83/84: JP Gunn
1985-89: Henry Suss
1989-91: G Peel
2004: Sarah Livesey - USDAW
2013: John Clegg - Unite
2019: John Morgan - NEU
2020: John Morgan - NEU
2025: Chris Jones - Unite
2026: Martin Hall - Unite
