= United Garment Workers' Trade Union =

Former trade union of the United Kingdom

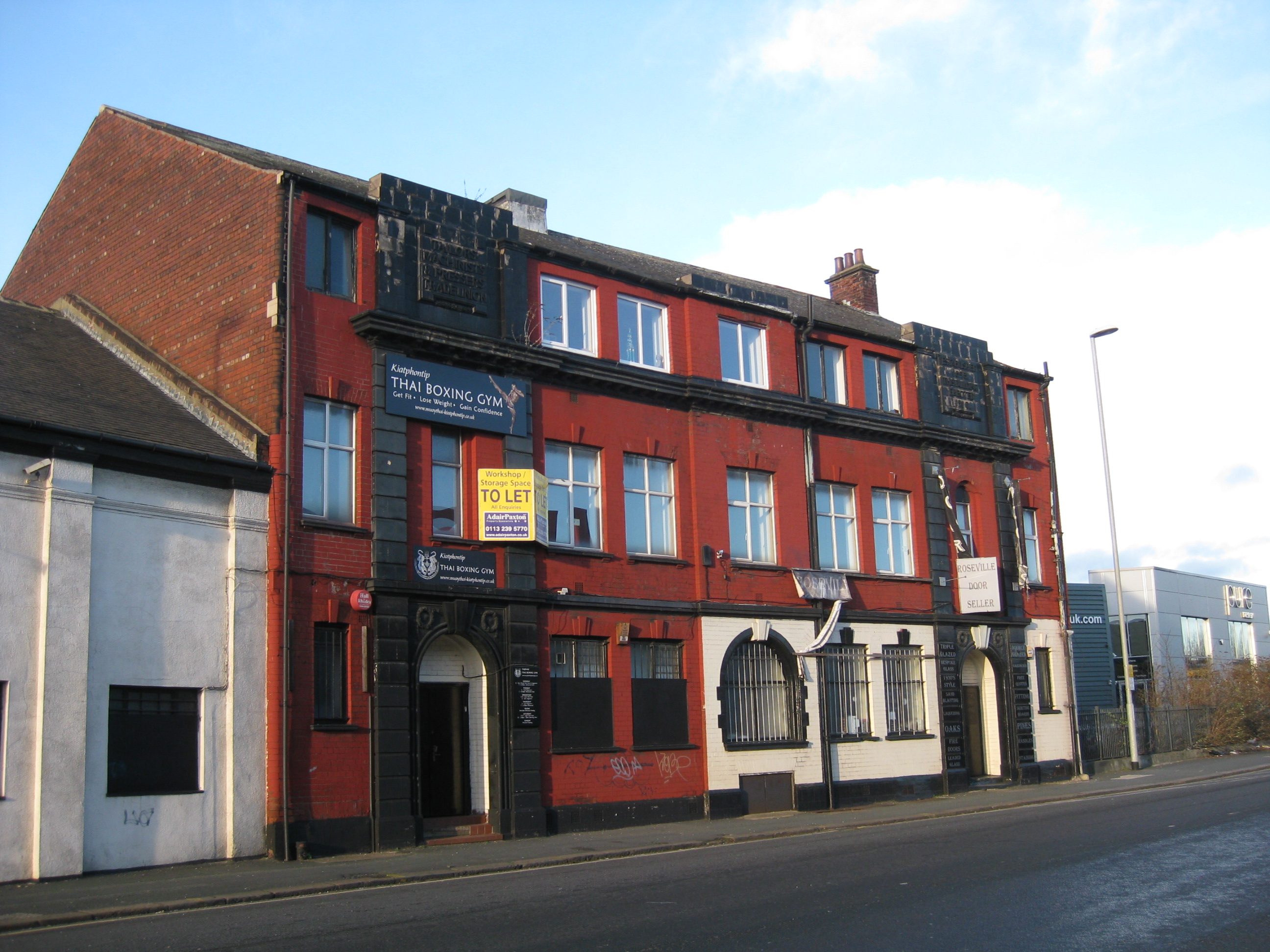
Offices of the Tailors' Machinists' and Pressers' Trade Union, a forerunner to the UGWTU in Sheepscar, Leeds.

The United Garment Workers' Trade Union (UGWTU) was a trade union in the United Kingdom.

The union was founded in 1915, with the merger of the Amalgamated Union of Clothiers Operatives with the Amalgamated Jewish Tailors, Machinists and Pressers, the London and Provincial Cutters, the London Jewish Tailors, the Waterproof Garment Workers' Trade Union and the London Society of Tailors and Tailoresses. The Waterproof Garment Workers soon disaffiliated, but in 1919, the National Amalgamated Shirt, Collar and Jacket Society joined, and membership reached a peak of 102,000. In 1920, it merged with the Scottish Operative Tailors and Tailoresses Association to form the National Union of Tailors and Garment Workers.

The union's general secretary was Joseph Young, its financial secretary was Moses Sclare, and its organiser was Andrew Conley.
