= Waterproof Garment Workers' Trade Union =

UK labor union

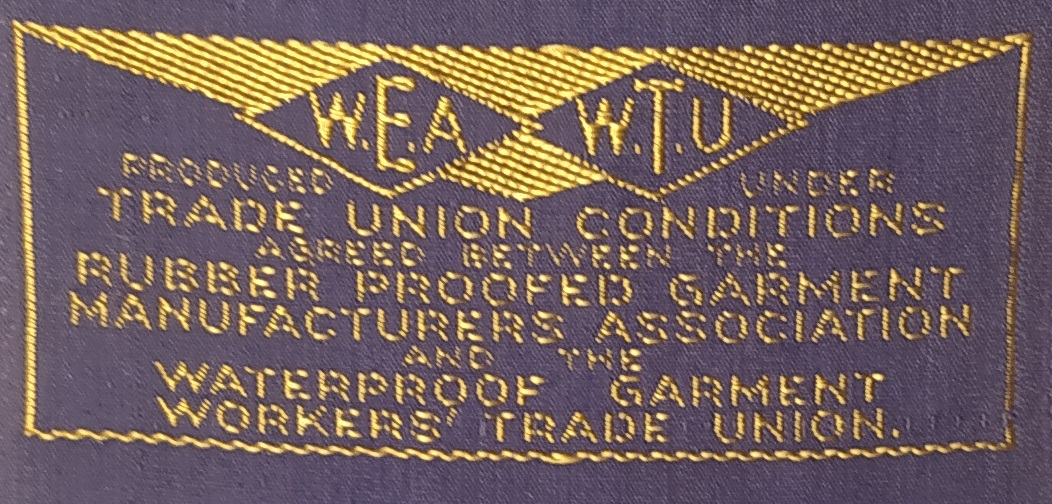
Union label produced by the union

The Waterproof Garment Workers' Trade Union was a trade union representing workers involved in making waterproof clothing in the United Kingdom.

The union was founded in 1907 as the Waterproof Garment Makers' and Machinists' Trade Union. Based in Salford, it originally had 382 members, but this dropped to only 70 by 1912. As a result, the union's leaders decided to disband the union, but some members wished to continue. They appointed Joseph Fogerty of the Amalgamated Society of Woodworkers as a full-time organiser, and he was able to reverse the decline; by 1915, it had more than 500 members.

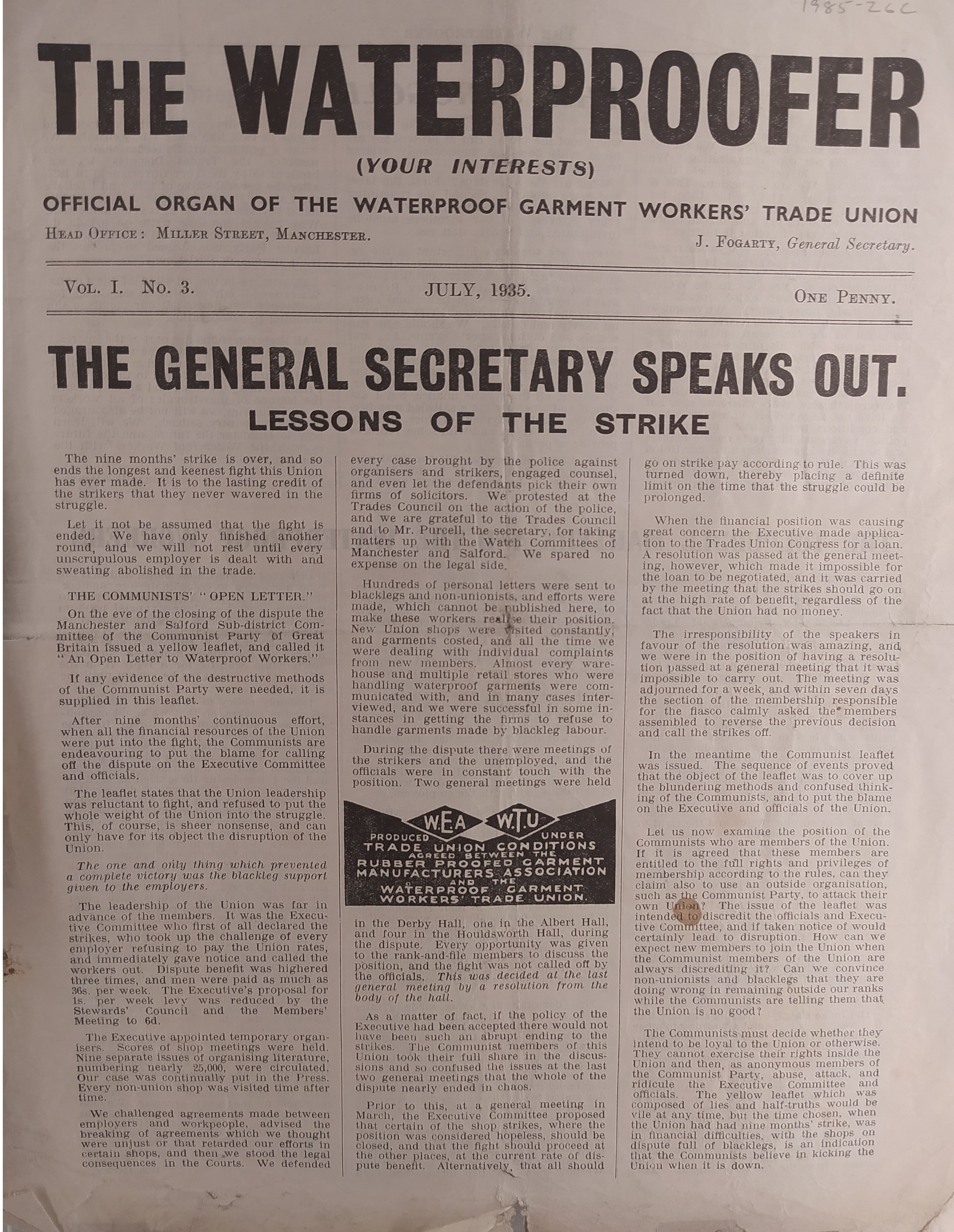
The Waterproofer, the union's journal, from 1935

In 1914, the union renamed itself as the "Waterproof Garment Workers' Trade Union". The following year, it was a founder constituent of the United Garment Workers' Trade Union, but it retained significant autonomy, and became independent once more in 1921. The Great Depression saw great unhappiness among members with the union's organisation, many members leaving as a result. The General Council of the Trades Union Congress conducted an investigation, which concluded that the union should reform its structures, and the breakaway members should return to the union.

In 1936, the union was involved in a dispute at J. Meek and Co, in Manchester, and unhappiness about its handling of it led to the whole executive being replaced. This did not affect union membership, which reached a peak of 3,100 in 1947, with about three-quarters of members being women.

From the 1950s, membership of the union declined in line with employment in the industry, and by 1971 it had only 714 members remaining. The following year, it voted to amalgamate with the National Union of Tailors and Garment Workers.

== General Secretaries ==
1910s: Joseph Fogarty
1937: Ted Ainley
1939: F. C. Henry
