= I'm Talking about Jerusalem =

1960 play by Arnold Wesker

I'm Talking about Jerusalem is the final play by Arnold Wesker in The Wesker Trilogy of kitchen sink dramas. The first part is Chicken Soup with Barley and the second is Roots. The 'Jerusalem' in the play's title refers to William Morris's idea of the new Jerusalem (a socialist haven) and has been taken from William Blake's poem "And did those feet in ancient time". The full trilogy was first performed at the Belgrade Theatre, Coventry, in 1958 to 1959, and Jerusalem transferred to the Royal Court Theatre in 1958 where the full trilogy was staged in 1960.

== Synopsis ==
The play relates the story of Ada and her husband, Dave Simmonds. The couple, along with Ada's brother Ronnie and her mother Sarah, moves into a house in rural Norfolk to live their lives off the grid. While they try to live their lives in terms of their socialist ideals, they face different problems. Dave is dismissed from his job at a farm for petty theft. The family finally returns to London after 13 years, while a sense of failure looms over them.
