= Arnold Wesker =

British dramatist (1932–2016)

Sir Arnold Wesker FRSL
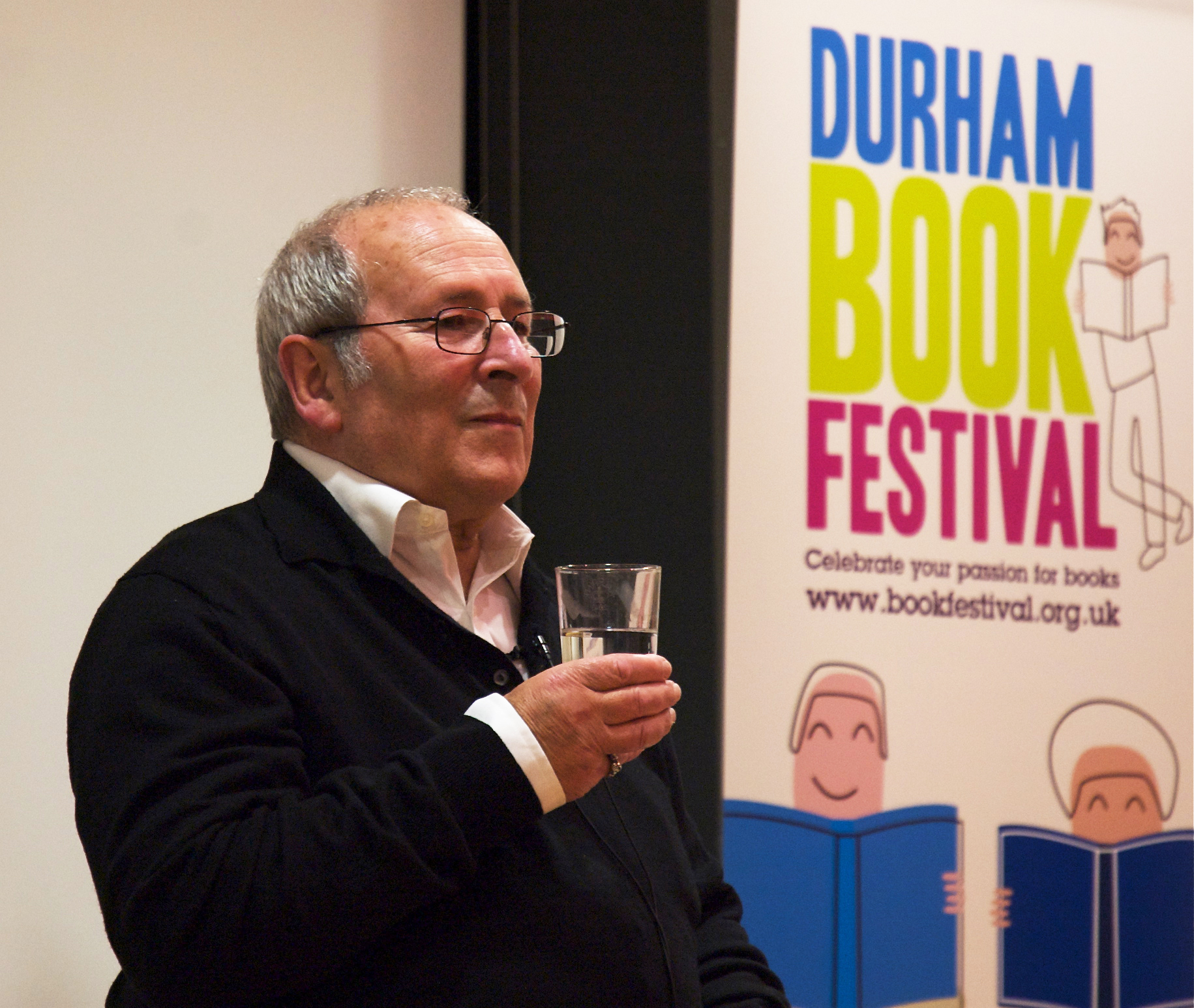
- Wesker at the Durham Book Festival in 2008
- Born: 24 May 1932; Stepney, London, England
- Died: 12 April 2016 (aged 83); Brighton, England
- Occupation: Dramatist
- Website: arnoldwesker.com

Sir Arnold Wesker FRSL (24 May 1932 – 12 April 2016) was an English dramatist. He was the author of 50 plays, four volumes of short stories, two volumes of essays, much journalism and a book on the subject, a children's book, some poetry, and other assorted writings. His plays have been translated into 20 languages, and performed worldwide.

== Early life ==
Wesker was born in Stepney, London, in 1932, and grew up in Spitalfields, the son of Leah (née Cecile Leah Perlmutter), a cook, and Joseph Wesker, a tailor's machinist and active communist. The doctor in attendance at his birth was Samuel Sacks, the father of neurologist Oliver Sacks.

Wesker attended a Jewish infants' school in Whitechapel. His education was then fragmented during the Second World War. He was briefly evacuated to Ely, Cambridgeshire, before returning to London where he attended Dean Street School during the Blitz. He then returned to live with his parents who had moved to a council flat in Hackney, east London, where he attended Northwold Road School. He then attended Upton House Central School, Hackney, from 1943. This was a school where emphasis was placed on teaching office skills, including typing, to bright boys who had not been selected for grammar school places. He was then evacuated again to Llantrisant, South Wales.

He was accepted into the Royal Academy of Dramatic Art but could not afford to take up his place there. Later, he served for two years in the Royal Air Force, and then went on to work as cook, furniture maker, and bookseller. After saving up enough money, he went to study at the London School of Film Technique, now known as the London Film School

== Career ==
His inspiration for the 1957 play The Kitchen, which was later made into a film, came when he was working at the Bell Hotel in Norwich. It was while working here that he met his future wife Dusty.

Wesker's plays deal with such themes as self-discovery, love, confrontation of death, and political disillusion. Chicken Soup with Barley (1958) went out to the regions. Rather than opening in the West End, its premiere was seen at the Coventry Theatre, a locale which typified Wesker's political views as an 'angry young man'.

His play Roots (1959) was a kitchen sink drama about a girl, Beatie Bryant, who returns after three years of stay in London to her farming family home in Norfolk and struggles to voice herself. Critics commended the "emotional authenticity" brought out in the play. Roots, The Kitchen, and Their Very Own and Golden City were staged by the English Stage Company at the Royal Court Theatre under the management of George Devine and later William Gaskill.

=== Nuclear disarmament ===
Wesker joined with enthusiasm the Royal Court group on the Aldermaston March in 1959. Another of the Royal Court contingent, Lindsay Anderson, made a short documentary film (March to Aldermaston) about the event. He was an active member of the Committee of 100 and, with other prominent members, was jailed in 1961 for his part in its campaign of mass nonviolent resistance to nuclear weapons.

=== Centre 42 ===
After his stay in prison in 1961, Wesker made a full-time commitment to become the leader of an initiative that had arisen from Resolution 42 of the 1960 Trades Union Congress, concerning the importance of arts in the community.

The Centre 42 group of artists, writers, actors and musicians, founded at the Bristol Trades Union Festival of 1962, had taken their name from Resolution 42 passed at the 1960 TUC Congress. Centre 42 was initially a touring festival aimed at devolving art and culture from London to the other main working class towns of Britain, moving to the Roundhouse in 1964. The project to establish a permanent arts centre struggled through subsequent years, because its funding was limited; Wesker fictionalised it in his play Their Very Own and Golden City (1966). Wesker dissolved the project formally in 1970, although The Roundhouse did open eventually as a permanent arts centre in 2006.

=== Writers & Readers Publishing Cooperative ===
Wesker co-founded, in 1974, the Writers & Readers Publishing Cooperative Ltd, with a group of writers that included John Berger, Lisa Appignanesi, Richard Appignanesi, Chris Searle and Glenn Thompson.

== Later works ==
The Journalists (1972) was commissioned by the Royal Shakespeare Company and researched at The Sunday Times at a time it when was edited by Harold Evans. The RSC's literary manager Ronald Bryden thought it would be "the play of the decade" and it was scheduled to be directed by David Jones. The actors in that year's RSC company refused to perform it, Wesker said, because they were under the influence of the Workers Revolutionary Party. (The WRP was not founded until 1973, but its forerunner, the Socialist Labour League, had many sympathisers in the RSC.) Wesker wrote in 2004 that he had also "committed the politically incorrect crime of creating Tory ministers who were intelligent rather than caricatures".

The Journalists received its American premiere at the Back Alley Theatre in Los Angeles in 1979. It was directed by Laura Zucker and produced by Allan Miller.

Wesker's play The Merchant (1976), which he later renamed Shylock, uses the same three stories used by Shakespeare for his play The Merchant of Venice.

In this retelling, Shylock and Antonio are fast friends bound by a common love of books, culture and a disdain for the crass antisemitism of the Christian community's laws. They make the bond in defiant mockery of the Christian establishment, never anticipating that the bond might become forfeit. When it does, the play argues, Shylock must carry through on the letter of the law or jeopardise the scant legal security of the entire Jewish community. He is, therefore, quite as grateful as Antonio when Portia, as in Shakespeare's play, shows the legal way out.

The play received its American premiere on 16 November 1977 at New York's Plymouth Theatre with Joseph Leon as Shylock, Marian Seldes as Shylock's sister Rivka and Roberta Maxwell as Portia. This production had a challenging history in previews on the road, culminating (after the first night out of town in Philadelphia on 8 September 1977) with the death of the exuberant Broadway star Zero Mostel, who was initially cast as Shylock.

Wesker wrote a book, The Birth of Shylock and the Death of Zero Mostel, chronicling the entire process from initial submissions and rejections of the play through to rehearsals, Zero's death, and the disappointment of the critical reception for the Broadway opening. The book reveals much about the playwright's relationship to director John Dexter (who had been the earliest, near-familial interpreter of Wesker's works), to criticism, to casting, and to the ephemeral process of collaboration through which the text of any play must pass.

In 2005, he published his first novel, Honey, which recounted the experiences of Beatie Bryant, the heroine of his earlier play Roots. The novel broke from the previously established chronology. Roots was set in the early 1960s and Beatie is 22; but in Honey she has only aged three years yet the action has been transplanted into the 1980s. Other oddities are that the timeframe includes the Rushdie affair and John Major's fall as recent events and yet the action is concerned with the dotcom boom.

In 2008, Wesker published his first collection of poetry, All Things Tire of Themselves (Flambard Press). The collection dates back many years and represents what he considered his best and most characteristic poems. He was a member of the editorial advisory board of Jewish Renaissance magazine.

He was a patron of the Shakespeare Schools Festival, a charity that enables school children across the UK to perform Shakespeare in professional theatres.

He was the castaway on Desert Island Discs, BBC Radio 4, in 1966 and again in 2006.

== Archive ==
Wesker's papers, covering his entire career, were acquired by the Harry Ransom Center at the University of Texas at Austin in 2000. The collection contains not only the prolific output of the playwright, novelist and poet but also is framed within the larger historical context of international events. Wesker was actively involved in the organizing of his archive, and before shipping it to the Ransom Center compiled a list of the contents, which is also available to scholars for consultation. The collection's contents include over three hundred boxes of manuscript drafts, correspondence, production ephemera, personal records, and other materials. Wesker's family shipped the last of his papers to the Ransom Center in March 2016, shortly before his death.

On 13 April 2016, the Leader of the Opposition, Jeremy Corbyn, gave thanks for the playwright's life. They shared a socialist background in London, where Corbyn is an MP.

I am sure the whole House will join me in mourning the death of the dramatist Arnold Wesker, one of the great playwrights of this country, one of those wonderful angry young men of the 1950s who, like so many angry young people, changed the face of our country.

The BBC repeated in May 2016 the retrospective radio programme on Wesker's career that was first broadcast on his 80th birthday.

== Personal life ==
"And though, like most writers, I fear dying before I write that one masterpiece for which I'll be remembered, yet I look at the long row of published work that I keep before me on my desk and I think, not bad, Wesker, not bad."
– Wesker on his 70th birthday

Wesker married Doreen Bicker in 1958, after meeting at a hotel in Norwich where Wesker was working as a kitchen porter and Doreen as a chambermaid. He gave her the nickname of "Dusty", because of her "gold-dust" hair; an Arts Council bursary of £500 covered the cost of their marriage. The character Beatie, in the "Wesker trilogy" of plays, was inspired by her. The couple had three children: Lindsay, Tanya and Daniel. Lindsay was named after director Lindsay Anderson. Tanya died in 2012. Wesker also had another daughter Elsa, with Swedish journalist, Disa Håstad. He is the grandfather of Swedish rapper Yung Lean.

Wesker died on 12 April 2016 at the Royal Sussex County Hospital in Brighton. He was suffering from Parkinson's disease.

== Awards and honours ==
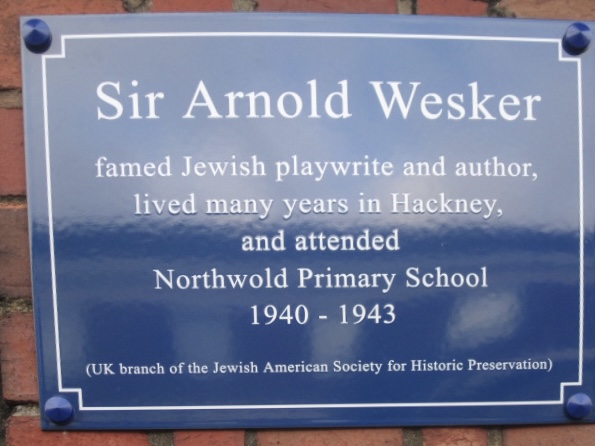
Commemorative plaque to Wesker at Northwold Primary School in Hackney: "famed Jewish playwrite [sic] and author"

Wesker received numerous awards throughout his career. In 1958 he received grant of £ 300 for the play Chicken Soup from the Arts Council of Great Britain. He used the money to marry Bicker. The following year he won the Evening Standard Theatre Award in the "Most Promising Playwright" category. He was presented with the Italian Marzotto Prize (a cash award of £3000) in 1964 for Their Very Own and Golden City, and the Spanish Best Foreign Play Award in 1979. He became a fellow of the Royal Society of Literature in 1985 and was presented with the Goldie Award in 1987. For his "distinguished service to theatre" he was honoured with the Last Frontier Lifetime Achievement Award in 1999. He was knighted in the 2006 New Year Honours. In December 2021 a plaque in Wesker's memory was installed at his former primary school, Northwold Road, Hackney, London, by the Jewish American Society for Historic Preservation.

== Works ==
The following list is drawn from Arnold Wesker's official website.

=== Plays ===
- The Kitchen, 1957 ISBN 978-1-84943-757-8
- Chicken Soup with Barley, 1958 ISBN 978-1-4081-5661-2
- Roots, 1959 ISBN 978-1-4725-7461-9
- I'm Talking about Jerusalem, 1960
- Menace, 1961 (for television)
- Chips with Everything, 1962
- The Nottingham Captain, 1962
- Four Seasons, 1965
- Their Very Own and Golden City, 1966
- The Friends, 1970
- The Old Ones, 1970
- The Journalists, 1972 ISBN 0-14-048133-8
- The Wedding Feast, 1974
- The Merchant, 1976
- Love Letters on Blue Paper, 1976
- One More Ride On The Merry-Go-Round, 1978
- Phoenix, 1980
- Caritas, 1980 ISBN 978-0-224-02020-6
- Voices on the Wind, 1980
- Breakfast, 1981
- Sullied Hand, 1981
- Four Portraits – Of Mothers, 1982
- Annie Wobbler, 1982
- Yardsale, 1983
- Cinders, 1983
- Whatever Happened to Betty Lemon?, 1986
- When God Wanted a Son, 1986
- Lady Othello, 1987
- Little Old Lady & Shoeshine, 1987
- Badenheim 1939, 1987
- Shoeshine, 1987
- The Mistress, 1988
- Beorhtel's Hill, 1988 (community play for Basildon)
- Men Die Women Survive, 1990
- Letter To A Daughter, 1990
- Blood Libel, 1991
- Wild Spring, 1992
- Bluey, 1993
- The Confession, 1993
- Circles of Perception, 1996
- Break, My Heart, 1997
- Denial, 1997
- Barabbas, 2000
- The Kitchen Musical, 2000
- Groupie, 2001 ISBN 1-84943-741-6
- Longitude, 2002
- The Rocking Horse, 2008 (commissioned by the BBC World Service)
- Joy and Tyranny, 2011 ISBN 978-1-84943-546-8

=== Fiction ===
- Six Sundays in January, Jonathan Cape, 1971
- Love Letters on Blue Paper, Jonathan Cape, 1974
- Said the Old Man to the Young Man, Jonathan Cape, 1978
- Fatlips, Writers and Readers Harper & Row, 1978
- The King's Daughters, Quartet Books, 1998
- Honey, Pocket Books, 2006

=== Non-fiction ===
- Distinctions, 1985 (collection of essays)
- Fears of Fragmentation, Jonathan Cape, 1971
- Say Goodbye You May Never See Them Again, Jonathan Cape, 1974
- Journey Into Journalism, Writers & Readers, 1977
- The Dusty Wesker Cook Book, Chatto & Windus, 1987
- As Much as I Dare, Century Random House, 1994 (Autobiography)
- The Birth of Shylock and the Death of Zero Mostel, Quartet Books, 1997
- Wesker On Theatre, 2010 (collection of essays) ISBN 978-1-84943-376-1
- Ambivalences, Oberon Books, 2011
