= Roots (play) =

1958 production by Arnold Wesker

Cover of 1st Edition, Penguin, 1959

Roots (1958) is the second play by Arnold Wesker in The Wesker Trilogy. The first part is Chicken Soup with Barley and the final play is I'm Talking about Jerusalem. Roots focuses on Beatie Bryant as she makes the transition from being an uneducated working-class woman obsessed with Ronnie, her unseen liberal boyfriend, to a woman who can express herself and the struggles of her time. It is written in the Norfolk dialect of the people on which it focuses, and is considered to be one of Wesker's kitchen sink dramas. Roots was first presented at the Belgrade Theatre, Coventry, in May 1959 with Joan Plowright in the lead before transferring to the Royal Court Theatre, London.

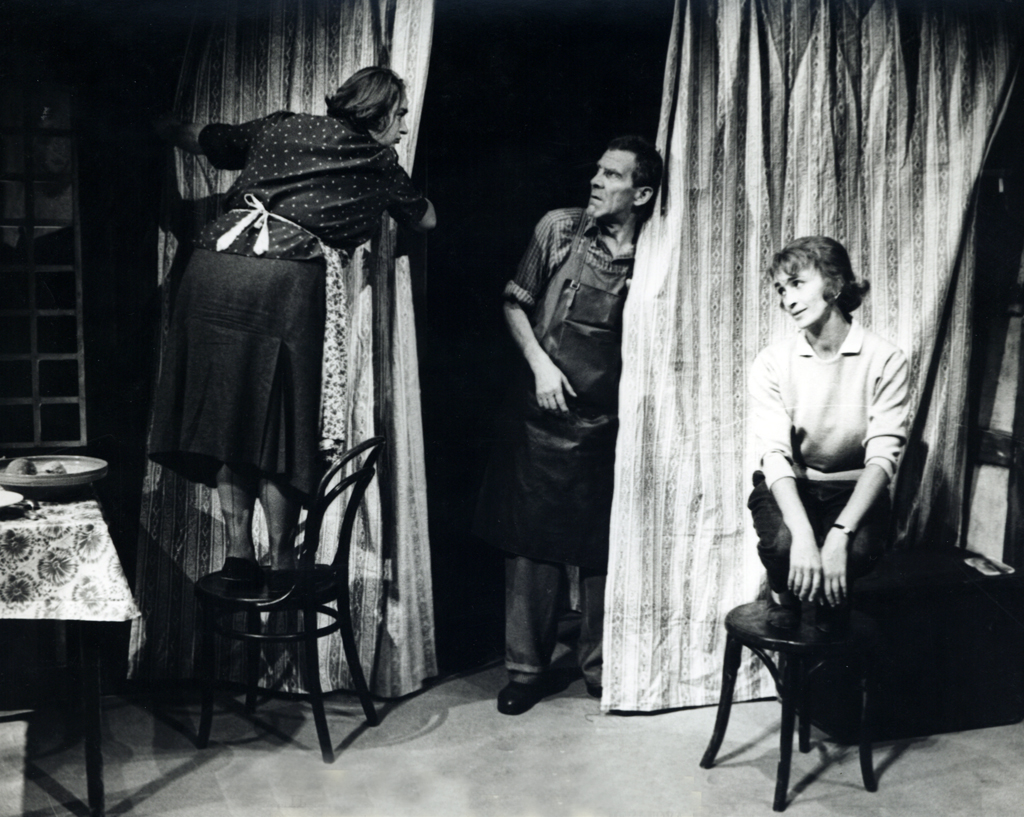
The play by the Ljubljana Drama Theatre in 1964

== Plot ==
=== Act 1 ===
Beatie arrives back in her native Norfolk to stay with her sister.

=== Act 2 ===
Beatie visits her parents.

=== Act 3 ===
Beatie and her family await Ronnie's arrival, until a letter arrives from him announcing he is leaving Beatie.

== Notable productions ==
Gene Wilder made his off-Broadway debut in the 1961 New York City production as Frankie Bryant.

In 2008 Jo Combes directed a production at the Royal Exchange, Manchester, with Denise Black as Mrs Bryant and Claire Brown as Beatie Bryant. Black won a MEN Award for her performance.

2024 adaptation stars Morfydd Clark & Billy Howle
