= Equity Waiver Plan =

Plan to support theaters in Los Angeles

The Equity Waiver Plan, also known as the 99-Seat Theater Plan, was first introduced in 1972 by Edward Weston, the West Coast representative of Actors' Equity. The plan was designed to provide more flexibility for small theaters in Los Angeles County, which had previously been restricted by the "workshop code." Under the workshop code, small theaters could not charge admission, run public productions for more than nine performances, or advertise. They also could not solicit or accept donations. The plan removed several restrictions that had applied under the workshop code.

== 1970s ==
The Equity Waiver Plan, as first proposed in 1972, allowed non-union actors (and union actors paid much less than scale) to perform at theaters with 99 seats or less. It was originally intended to help small theaters in Los Angeles grow by allowing them to operate with less stringent union regulations. Under the 1970s-era plan, actors were paid between $5 and $14 per performance, depending on box office revenue. However, productions that ran more than 80 performances were required to transition to an Equity contract, which would pay actors more.

By 1976, the number of small theaters operating under the plan had increased. Writing in the Los Angeles Times, Sylvie Drake credited the waiver plan with contributing to the growth of small theaters.

== 1980s ==
By the mid-1980s, the number of waiver theaters in Los Angeles County had grown significantly, from 42 in 1980 to an estimated 130 by 1985. Some waiver theaters grew into larger operations that paid actors wages. However, actors began to raise concerns about working conditions in some waiver theaters. Actors reported being asked to provide their own costumes, build sets, and even clean the theaters, all while working long hours with little or no pay. This led to concerns about exploitation and unsafe working conditions. In response to these issues, Equity took action and began to focus on ensuring better protections for its members.

In 1986, a joint committee was formed by Equity to examine the concerns and propose changes. This committee included input from 165 waiver operators across Los Angeles County. In 1988, after much debate, a referendum was created with proposed changes, including reinstating some union regulation of small theaters. The proposed changes led to significant opposition from theater operators, who feared that the stricter regulations would put an end to small theater productions in the region. Many actors were also opposed to the changes.

The Western Advisory Board recommended a revised 99-Seat Theater Plan with stronger union rules. Some union members protested and threatened legal action. ATLAS then proposed an alternative plan with different pay and rehearsal provisions.

In January 1989, Equity and ATLAS reached a compromise. The new agreement required minimum payments for actors and placed restrictions on the length of theater runs, limiting them to 80 performances. The basic structure remained in place for several years, although disputes between Equity and theater operators continued.

== 2000s ==
In 2000, the union made changes to the plan so that the size of the theater, rather than weekly gross revenue, would determine actor payments for the first 12 weeks of a production. In 2014, Equity conducted a survey among its members and found that most believed the plan favored producers over actors. The survey later became part of renewed debate over the plan.

== 2010s ==
The debate over the 99-Seat Theater Plan resurfaced in the 2010s. In 2015, Actors Equity mandated a $9 hourly minimum wage for actors working in Los Angeles theaters with fewer than 100 seats. This new policy was met with mixed reactions. Supporters argued that the minimum wage would improve actor compensation, while opponents said the increased costs could force small theaters to reduce productions or close.
