= Sheffield Outrages =

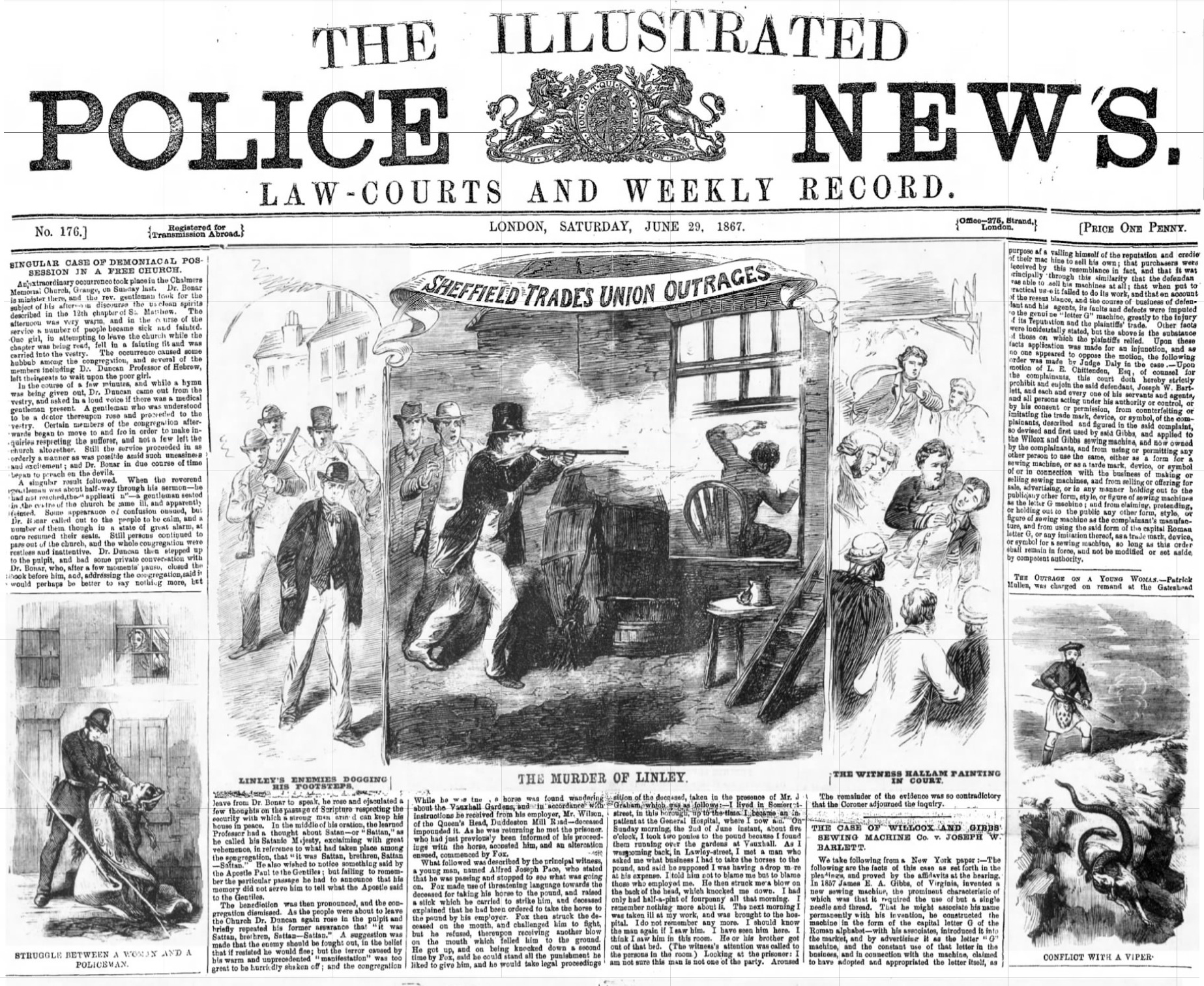
Sheffield Trades Union Outrages, The Illustrated Police News, 1867

The Sheffield Outrages were a series of explosions and murders by a group of metal worker trade unionists carried out in Sheffield, England in the 1850s and 1860s.

== Background ==
=== Working conditions ===
Sheffield's early success in steel production had involved long working hours, in conditions which offered little or no safety protection. In The Condition of the Working Class in England in 1844, Friedrich Engels quotes a local doctor, Dr. Knight, regarding the so-called "Grinder's Asthma" suffered by the Sheffield cutlery workers in the mid 19th century:

They usually begin their work in the fourteenth year, and if they have good constitutions, rarely notice any symptoms before the twentieth year. Then the symptoms of their peculiar disease appear. They suffer from shortness of breath at the slightest effort in going up hill or up stairs, they habitually raise the shoulders to relieve the permanent and increasing want of breath; they bend forward, and seem, in general, to feel most comfortable in the crouching position in which they work. Their complexion becomes dirty yellow, their features express anxiety, they complain of pressure on the chest. Their voices become rough and hoarse, they cough loudly, and the sound is as if air were driven through a wooden tube.

=== Chartist movement ===
The city became one of the main centres for trade union organisation and agitation in the United Kingdom.

By the mid-late 1860s the majority of the objectives of the Chartist movement had been frustrated. These social and political reformers had not accomplished all they had hoped to, although they had succeeded in lobbying for the establishment of the first town council in 1843.

=== Rattenings ===
According to historian Arthur Downing, rattenings were "morally acceptable punishments" employed by trade unions to keep "recalcitrant" members in line and ensure union solidarity, such as: sending threatening letters from "Mary Ann", damaging machinery or physical intimidation, so called because the aftermath looked like "the rats had been". Downing argues that the Outrages should be seen within this social context.

According to the Enquiry Commission report (see below), rattening incidents in the 1860s included "manufacturers and ‘masters’ having grinding bands taken, livestock killed, cisterns ‘bored’ and bellows cut for employing non-union men, hiring apprentices, introducing machinery and paying below union prices." Additionally, the Fork Grinders threatened arson on a manufacturing works, one brick maker had 17,000 bricks destroyed as punishment for employing non-union workers, and one Joshua Tyzack was shot at.

== Casualties ==
The two individuals killed were Thomas Fearnehough and James Linley. Linley was trained as a scissor grinder and became a saw grinder where he employed several apprentices at cheaper rates than it would cost to employ union members. He was killed by two of his former apprentices, Samuel Crookes and James Hallam.

== Aftermath ==
The trade unions themselves sought a formal inquiry to establish the facts of the matter, largely as a result of accusations in the newspapers of complicity in these outrages resulting from investigations by W. C. Leng of the Sheffield Daily Telegraph. E. S. Beesly was heavily criticised for a statement seen to be defending the Outrages, that: "a trades' union murder was neither better nor worse than any other murder." On 17 November 1866 a delegation, which included members of the Sheffield Trades Council and the London Trades Council, requested that the Home Secretary take the necessary measures to investigate.

This led to a Special Commission of Enquiry into these occurrences in May 1867. The investigation that commenced, constituting part of a larger investigation into trade unionism at the time, was a "quasi-judicial examination" and one of "unusual depth". It largely ignored interviewees' grievances of exploitation, choosing to focus only on the crimes committed. Isaac Ironside called the Enquiry a "conspiracy of the governing and employing classes to crush the liberties of the working men and their means of defence".

The investigation offered immunity to all who gave evidence and, as a result a number of people were encouraged to testify. Among these was William Broadhead, the Secretary of the Sawgrinders' Union at that time, who described how he had paid two workmen £15 to murder an employer James Linley, who, according to Broadhead, had taken on too many apprentices.
