= Amalgamated Society of Tailors and Tailoresses =

Former trade union of the United Kingdom

The Amalgamated Society of Tailors and Tailoresses (AST&T) was a trade union representing tailors in the United Kingdom.

The union was founded in 1866 when Peter Shorrocks convened a conference in Manchester of local societies of tailors. The conference was hugely successful, with 67 societies sending representatives, and 31 others sending messages giving their support to the formation of a national union. By the end of the year, membership of the new Amalgamated Society of Journeymen Tailors was more than 7,000, with the large majority of local societies in England and Ireland signing up, although the Scottish Amalgamated Society of Tailors remained separate.

The union campaigned for agreements on local wages, and where disputes arose, the union generally won by launching strike action in a single town. The union also campaigned against subcontracting and homeworking, and the employment of women. This last point became increasingly controversial within the union and, in 1900, it finally created a female section, and changed its name to the "Amalgamated Society of Tailors and Tailoresses". Members of the Female Section paid lower contributions, but also receive fewer benefits from the union.

In 1905, 900 members in London split away, led by James MacDonald, to form the London Society of Tailors and Tailoresses, after their requests to operate on a largely independent, federal basis were rejected. Despite this, the Amalgamated Society continued to grow, reaching 12,000 members in 1911, and including workers in closely related trades from 1927, when it adopted the name Amalgamated Society of Tailors, Tailoresses and Kindred Workers. This enabled it to maintain membership levels despite a reduction in the number of jobs in the industry, due to increased mechanisation. In 1932, on the suggestion of the Trades Union Congress, it merged into the Tailors and Garment Workers' Union, which was renamed as the National Union of Tailors and Garment Workers.

== General Secretaries ==
1866: Peter Shorrocks
1886?: George Keir
1894: T. A. Flynn
1925: Gurney Rowlerson
