= Labour Electoral Association =

British political organisation

The Labour Electoral Association was a political organisation in the United Kingdom which aimed to get working men elected to Parliament.

== Foundation ==
The issue of political representation for workers had become increasingly important for the Trades Union Congress (TUC). At the 1885 congress, there was unanimous support for James Stafford Murchie's motion, introduced on behalf of the International Working Men's Association, that candidates who were members of trade unions should be welcomed, as should the establishment of Labour Associations in London and Birmingham, which aimed to support their election.

At the 1886 TUC congress, George Shipton called for the establishment of funds to support trade union candidates, and T. R. Threlfall, who had himself stood unsuccessfully for Parliament at that year's general election. successfully proposed that a Labour Electoral Committee be established. The initial committee consisted of John Wilson (President), William Abraham and James M. Jack (Vice-Presidents), Stuart Uttley (Chairman), Edward Harford (Treasurer), and Threlfall (Secretary).

== Development ==
The committee had some initial success, with "over a dozen" local associations established in its first year, these generally being linked to a trades council. However, it was hampered by a lack of any programme, disagreements over whether it should support candidates in local elections, and whether it could support Conservative Party or independent candidates, or only Liberal Party ones. Although this was not officially resolved, its local associations did start supporting local candidates. The committee frequently debated the merits of Liberal-Labour and independent labour candidacies; its position was generally to support only candidates who were thought to have widespread local backing, and never stand propaganda candidates in the hope of building support. Where trades councils had socialist majorities, independent candidates were sometimes given support, but elsewhere, only Liberals were endorsed.

In 1887, the committee renamed itself as the "Labour Electoral Association" (LEA). It also described itself as "the centre of the National Labour Party", and its candidates sometimes described their affiliation as to the National Labour Party. The TUC congress agreed to support the formation of further local associations, and (through an amendment of Robert Knight) to call for the payment of MPs. At the 1888 congress, Charles Fenwick, complained that the Association was working to discredit him and other existing Lib-Lab MPs, and an attempt by John Hodge to restrict its support to independent candidates failed.

The Local Government Act 1888 created county and county borough councils throughout England and Wales, to take over many local functions until then carried out by the unelected Quarter Sessions, and the first elections to them took place in January 1889.

By this point, Threlfall had moved from support for the independents to the Lib-Labs. The local associations saw some success in the local elections – for example, four working men were elected to Sheffield City Council, while, by 1890, William Matkin claimed that more than seventy trade unionists had been elected at the local level. However, more trades councils were developing socialist majorities, and the local labour associations would then either leave the LEA, or split between supporters of the Lib-Lab movement and those who called for independent labour candidates. The LEA, therefore, became increasingly dominated by supporters of the Liberal Party.

== Decline ==
In 1890, James MacDonald argued that the association should only support candidates who favoured nationalisation, but this policy was rejected by the TUC congress. However, the organisation's candidates were not particularly successful at the 1892 general election – although eight of nine parliamentary seats were held, and Joseph Arch and Sam Woods gained seats, the majority were not elected. By 1892, the socialists who favoured independent candidatures had gained strength, and Ben Tillett and John Hodge successfully proposed that the TUC would set up a new fund to support independent labour candidates. Although they claimed that this would complement the LEA, it was generally seen as being an attempt to undermine its continued support for Lib-Lab candidates.

At a TUC meeting in September 1892, an arrangements committee was formed with a view to creating an independent labour organisation. A conference chaired by William Henry Drew took place in Bradford from 14 to 16 January 1893 at the Bradford Labour Institute, the premises of the Labour Church. The Independent Labour Party was established, with Keir Hardie as its first chairman.

The LEA declined rapidly in importance, held its final congress in 1895, and dissolved the following year. However, some of its former local associations remained in existence; for example, the Dublin Labour Electoral Association finally achieved some local electoral success in 1898.

== See also ==
- Labour Representation Committee (formed in 1900)
- Labour Representation League (formed in 1869)
