= National Union of Tailors and Garment Workers =

Former trade union of the United Kingdom

NUTGW
- National Union of Tailors and Garment Workers
- Merged into: General, Municipal and Boilermakers and Allied Trades Union
- Founded: 1920
- Dissolved: 1991
- Headquarters: 14 Kensington Square, London
- Location: United Kingdom
- Members: 118,700 (1945)
- Affiliations: TUC, Labour

The National Union of Tailors and Garment Workers (NUTGW) was a trade union in the United Kingdom.

== History ==
The union was founded as the Tailors and Garment Workers' Union (T&GWU) in 1920 with the merger of the Scottish Operative Tailors and Tailoresses' Association and the United Garment Workers' Union. In 1932, it was joined by the Amalgamated Society of Tailors and Tailoresses and renamed itself as the "National Union of Tailors and Garment Workers". In 1939 it absorbed the United Ladies Tailors' Trade Union. The NUTGW had 118,700 members in 1945, making it the tenth largest union in Britain. It absorbed the Manchester-based Waterproof Garment Workers' Trade Union in 1972.

The NUTGW faced a long-term decline in membership over the second half of the 20th century as the number of workers employed in the British clothing industry shrunk. This was largely due to competition with foreign manufacturers. By 1990 membership had fallen to less than 70,000, from a peak of over 130,000 in 1950. The NUTGW merged into the General, Municipal, Boilermakers and Allied Trades Union in 1991.

== Election results ==
The union sponsored a Labour Party Member of Parliament from 1958 until 1964.

Election	Constituency	Candidate	Votes	Percentage	Position
1958 by-election	Shoreditch and Finsbury	Michael Cliffe	10,215	76.0	1
1959 general election	Shoreditch and Finsbury	Michael Cliffe	22,744	67.0	1

== General Secretaries ==
1920: Andrew Conley
1948: Anne Loughlin
1953: John E. Newton
1969: Jack Macgougan
1979: Alec Smith
