= Ragnhild Nikoline Andersen =

Danish trade unionist and politician

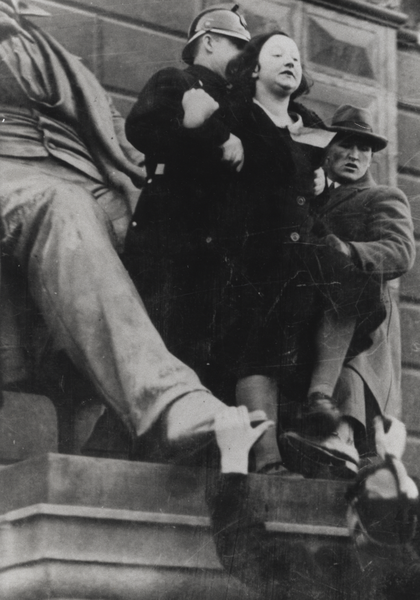
Andersen being arrested while speaking on Kongens Nytorv (1930s)

Ragnhild Nikoline Andersen (1907–1990) was a Danish trade unionist, politician, and a member of the Communist Party of Denmark (DKP). During the German occupation of Denmark in World War II, she was sent by the Gestapo to the Stutthof concentration camp near Gdańsk in Poland, where she spent 20 months in dreadful conditions before being rescued. After the war, she was elected to the Folketing, becoming a member of DKP's central committee and one of the most prominent members of the party. She promoted wider access to abortions and improvements to women's rights.

== Biography ==
Born on 18 August 1907 in Yderby on the tip of Sjællands Odde, Ragnhild Nikoline Andersen was the daughter of the harbour master Nikolaj Andreas Andersen (1875–1954) and Gertrud Birgitte née Hansen (1881–1964). In 1937, she married Finn Johannes Salemonsson but the marriage was dissolved in 1949. In 1952, she married fellow communist politician Peter Alfred Jensen (1903–1988).

Brought up on Sjællands Odde, Andersen was the only one of the family's seven children who enjoyed extensive schooling. In 1925, she moved to Copenhagen, where she performed various kinds of office work. She joined Danmarks Kommunistike Ungdom (the communist youth movement) and the trade union HK. An active member of the children's organization Unge Pionerere, she edited their magazine from 1928 and accompanied a group of children on a trip to the Soviet Union in 1929. On her return she abandoned office work to take up employment as a metal worker in a radio factory where she joined the Danish Women Workers' Union (KAD), later becoming a prominent member. She worked with a group of women, many of whom were communists, like their leader Inger Gamburg with whom she developed a close friendship.

In 1929, Andersen became a member of the Danish Communist Party where she was active throughout the 1930s. During this period, she took part in demonstrations and similar political activities. On one occasion, she climbed onto the statue of Adam Oehlenschläger on Kongens Nytorv in central Copenhagen and attempted to address her followers. She was however soon arrested for disorderly conduct.

When the communist party was declared illegal under the German occupation, she went underground but was soon arrested and sent to Vestre Prison in September 1941 and then to Horserød. In October 1943, together with six other communist women and 143 men, she was transferred by the Gestapo to Stutthof Concertation Camp near Gdańsk. After 20 dreadful months of captivity, six of the seven returned to Denmark in 1945 after the country's liberation at the end of the war. Andersen tells of her experiences in great detail in Vi blev reddet denne Gang (We were saved that time) published in 1945.

In the autumn of 1945, together with 17 other communists, she was elected to the Folketing and was re-elected in 1947. After first representing the Frederiksborg constituency, in 1950 she was elected as a representative of Copenhagen, becoming a prominent member of the Communist Party. She was particularly active on social issues, calling for improvements in conditions for the disadvantaged, for the establishment of sex clinics, for more extensive access to abortion and for a woman's right to part-time employment. She continued to stand for the Communist Party but was not re-elected. In 1968, she earned more votes than the other two communists, despite the fact that she was only number three on the party's list.

Ragnhild Andersen died in Copenhagen on 8 May 1990. She is buried in Vestre Cemetery.
