= Lizette Risgaard =

Danish trade union leader (born 1960)

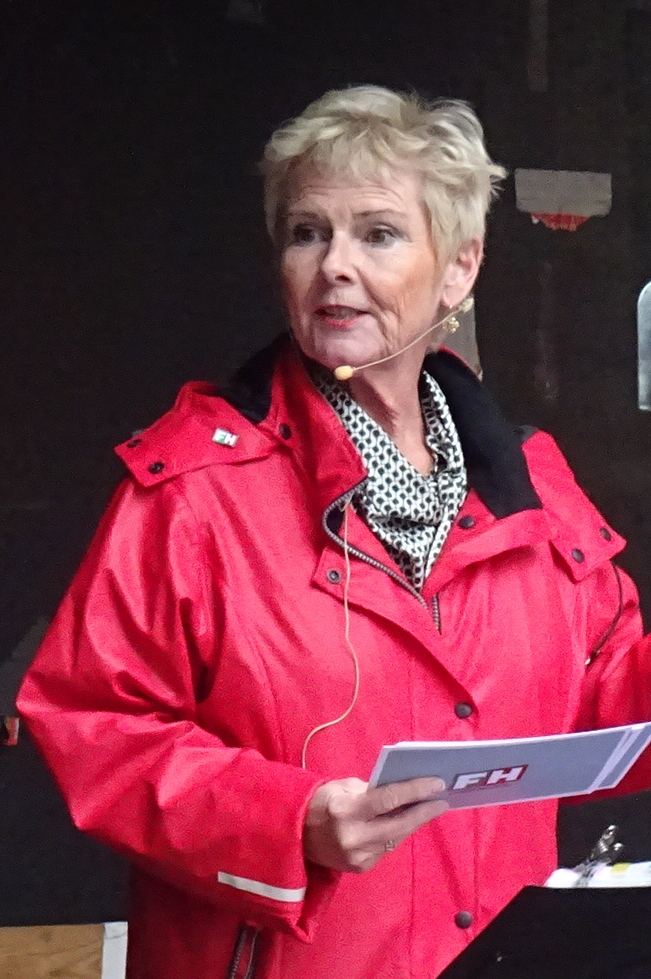

Chairman of the Danish Trade Union Confederation
- In office 1 January 2019 – 30 April 2023
- Preceded by: Office established
- Succeeded by: Morten Skov Christensen

Chairman of the Danish Confederation of Trade Unions
- In office 27 October 2015 – 31 December 2018
- Preceded by: Harald Børsting
- Succeeded by: Office abolished

Personal details
- Born: Helle Lizette Risgaard; 15 July 1960 (age 66) Kalundborg, Denmark

Lizette Risgaard (born 15 July 1960) is a Danish trade unionist. In 2015, she became chair of the Danish Confederation of Trade Unions. The confederation merged with the FTF at the end of 2018 to form the Danish Trade Union Confederation, and she became the new organization's first chair upon its establishment in 2019.

Born in Nørrebro, Risgaard grew up in a small house and found work as a cleaner. She moved to Amager, where she trained as an office assistant, while working part-time in a canteen. In 1980, she began working for the Danish Service Workers' Union, and was elected to the board of its youth organisation. She worked her way up to become president of the union, and also deputy president of the Capital Region branch of the Danish Confederation of Trade Unions (LO) in 2000. In her spare time, she completed a Masters in Public Administration.

In 2007, Risgaard was elected as vice president of the LO. In this role, she became known for her successful campaign for Ryanair to comply with Danish pay and working conditions for its staff based in the country. In 2015, she was elected as the president of LO, defeating Flemming Vinther of the Army Privates' and Corporals' Association, by 312 votes to 87. She was the first woman to lead the federation.

As leader of the LO, Risgaard dismissed its four leading staff members, and instead made her own appointments to the post. She built a strong working relationship with the leaders of the Confederation of Professionals in Denmark, LO's main rival, and in 2019, the two merged to form the Danish Trade Union Confederation (FH), with Risgaard continuing as president.

In 2023, Risgaard stepped down as president of FH following a series of revelations regarding inappropriate sexual behaviour on Risgaard's part.

A documentary, Hjerter dame, follows Risgaard as leader of the LO.

Trade union offices
Preceded by Harald Børsting	President of the Danish Confederation of Trade Unions; 2015–2018	Succeeded by Federation merged
Preceded by New position	President of the Danish Trade Union Confederation; 2019–present	Succeeded by Incumbent
