= Danish Railway Union =

Danish trade union

The Danish Railway Union (Danish: Dansk Jernbaneforbund, DJF) is a trade union representing railway employees in Denmark.

The union was founded in 1899 to represent administrative staff of Danish State Railways, and it affiliated to the Danish Confederation of Trade Unions (LO). By 1954, it had more than 10,000 members.

In 1984, the Private Railway Personnel Union merged into the DJF. As a result, it now represents staff of all railway companies in the country, and also staff of the Copenhagen Metro.

The union's membership has gradually fallen, to 7,260 in 1997, and 5,100 in 2014. Since 2017, it has collaborated with the Aviation Industry Workers' Union in the Aviation and Railway Trades Organisation. It is affiliated to the Danish Trade Union Confederation, successor of the LO.
