= Inger Gamburg =

Danish trade unionist and politician (1892–1979)

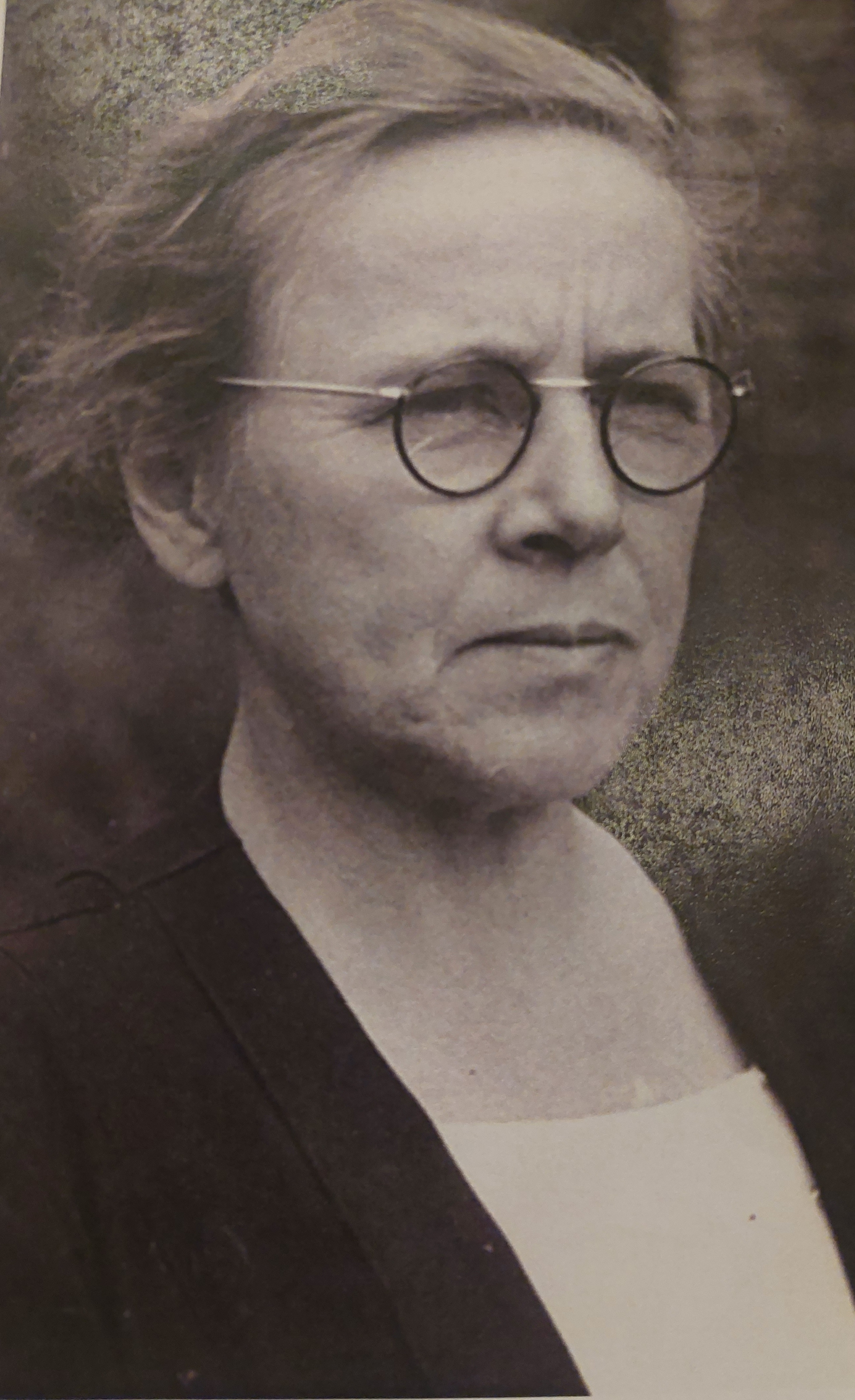
Inger Gamburg

Ingeborg (Inger) Johanne Gamburg née Mohr (1892–1979) was a Danish trade unionist and a member of the Communist Party of Denmark. From 1925, she chaired Arbejderkvinders Oplysningsforening (Women Workers' Enlightenment Association). As a Communist, under the German occupation of Denmark in the Second World War, she was imprisoned in Denmark in June 1941 and later sent to the Stutthof Concentration Camp near Gdańsk where she spent 30 months until the German capitulation. From 1946, she was a member of the Copenhagen City Council (Borgerrepræsentation).

== Biography ==
Born on 25 January 1892 in Holbæk, Inger Mohr was the daughter of the metal worker August Andreas Søren Mohr (1854–1894) and Ane Sofie Christensen (1859–1909). In 1922, she married Abram Itzik Gamburg (1890–1950), a timber worker from Latvia. The marriage was dissolved in 1933.

Mohr's father, who chaired the Social Democrats in Holbæk, died in an accident when she was just two years old. She and her five siblings were brought up by her mother who died of pneumonia when Mohr was 12. As a result, she first worked as a maid, then as a chocolate factory worker before spending six years working in the Tuborg Brewery. She encouraged the women workers to go out on strike, but while this led to an increase in wages, she lost her job after a dispute with the union leader, Helga Larsen, who had just been elected to the Folketing. Her next job was at Hellesens Elementfabrik where she worked with coal and graphite.

After her marriage in 1922, Inger Gamburg was increasingly active in the Danish Women Workers' Union (Kvindeligt Arbejderforbunds KAD), becoming secretary of the metal workers section in 1924. Together with Marie-Sophie Nielsen, a communist, in 1925 she established the radical Women Workers' Enlightenment Association (Arbejderkvindernes Oplysningsforening AO) where she became chair. It was the first women's organization in Denmark to call for free abortions. Gamburg also fought for equal pay for men and women, although it did not become part of the organization's official agenda until after the Second World War. One of her closest friends and allies, both in the KAD and the AO was Ragnhild Andersen. In 1928, after attending the Red International of Labor Unions Congress in Moscow, Gamburg joined the Danish Communist Party (DKP). In 1930, together with Marie Nielsen she again visited the Soviet Union and became a member of DKP's central committee and in 1931–1932 of the politburo. After a fight with the trade unionist Alvilda Andersen in the early 1930s, she was thrown out of the KAD but was reinstated in 1938.

Like many other communists, under the German occupation she was arrested in June 1941 and held first in Copenhagen's Vestre Prison and then in Horserød. In October 1943, she was transferred together with six other women to the Stutthof concentration camp near Gdańsk. Rescued by the Allies at the end of the war in May 1945, she was returned to Denmark, where she was hospitalized for typhus. Six months later, she continued to chair the metalworkers' section of the KAD, later becoming a member of the organization's executive committee. She also retained her place on the DKP's central committee until 1955. From 1946 to 1958, she was a member of the Copenhagen City Council. She stood for the Folketing several times but was not elected.

Inger Gamburg died in Copenhagen on 29 March 1979 and is buried in Bispebjerg Cemetery.
