= HKKF =

HKKF may stand for:

- Hong Kong & Kowloon Ferry, ferry company in Hong Kong
- Army Privates' and Corporals' Association, Danish trade union
