= Prosa (disambiguation) =

Prosa can refer to:

- Prosa, Norwegian literary magazine
- PROSA, Danish trade union
- Albert Prosa (b. 1990), Estonian football player
- Perosa Canavese, Turin province, Italy (Piedmontese name)
- In Medieval music, one type of trope

== See also ==
- Prose
