= Services Union =

Services Union is the name of:

- Australian Services Union, a trade union in Australia
- Services Union (Denmark), a Danish trade union
- Services Union (Netherlands), a former Dutch trade union
- United Services Union, an Australian trade union
