= Walter Schevenels =

Walter Schevenels (11 November 1894 – 6 March 1966) was a Belgian trade union official.

Born in Anderlecht, Schevenels' father was the secretary of the National Federation of Metal Workers, and Walter followed in his footsteps, soon becoming secretary of the union's Antwerp region.

In 1929, Schevenels was selected to become deputy general secretary of the International Federation of Trade Unions (IFTU), and in 1931 he succeeded as its general secretary. He maintained a relatively low profile, opposing both fascism and communism, and focusing on ensuring the federation's survival through political and financial crises.

During World War II, Schevenels ran the IFTU from London, and closely followed the policies of the British Trades Union Congress (TUC). The TUC, in response, tried to get him elected as the first general secretary of the World Federation of Trade Unions (WFTU), but he was instead made assistant general secretary, with responsibility for industry. A few years later, the International Confederation of Free Trade Unions (ICFTU) was formed as an anti-communist split from the WFTU, and Schevenels again hoped to be elected as general secretary, but was opposed by the American Federation of Labor on the grounds that he had co-operated with communists in the WFTU. Instead, he became the secretary of the Trade Union Advisory Committee to the OECD and soon also of the European Regional Organisation of the ICFTU, serving until his death in 1966.

In 1945, he attended the World Trade Union Conference in London alongside many renowned trade unionists.

Trade union offices
Preceded by Johannes Sassenbach	General Secretary of the International Federation of Trade Unions; 1931–1945	Succeeded by Federation dissolved
Preceded by New position	Deputy General Secretary of the World Federation of Trade Unions; 1946–1948	Succeeded by ?
Preceded by New position	General Secretary of the Trade Union Advisory Committee to the OECD; 1949–1966	Succeeded by Charles Ford
Preceded by New position	General Secretary of the ICFTU European Regional Organisation; 1950–1966	Succeeded by Charles Ford
