= Association of Social Educators =

Danish trade union

- Socialpædagogernes Landsforbund
- Abbreviation: SL
- Established: 1979; 47 years ago
- Type: Trade union
- Location: Denmark
- Fields: Social work
- Members: 35,648 (2018)
- Official language: Danish
- Affiliations: Danish Trade Union Confederation (FH)
- Website: sl.dk

The Association of Social Educators (Danish: Socialpædagogernes Landsforbund, SL) is a trade union representing social workers and carers in Denmark.

The union was founded by 1979, and was initially affiliated to the Confederation of Professionals in Denmark (FTF). In 1986. it left FTF, and instead affiliated with the Danish Confederation of Trade Unions (LO). The LO and FTF merged in 2019, and the union became a member of their successor, the Danish Trade Union Confederation (FH).

As of 2018, the union had 35,648 members.
