= ICFTU European Regional Organisation =

The ICFTU European Regional Organisation (ERO) was a regional trade union confederation, bringing together national federations of trade unions in Europe.

== History ==
The confederation was established in April 1950 at a conference in Brussels, held on the initiative of the recently formed International Confederation of Free Trade Unions (ICFTU). It was the first regional organisation established by the ICFTU, and was a new initiative, as the World Federation of Trade Unions and International Federation of Trade Unions had never set up regional bodies. ERO established its headquarters in Brussels.

The organisation aimed to represent European trade unions in all regional matters, but in particular in relation to the expected establishment of a European Community. However, competitor organisations soon emerged. The Committee of the Twenty-One was established in 1952, to liaise with the European Coal and Steel Community, and this was succeeded by the European Trade Union Secretariat (ETUS), representing trade union federations in the European Economic Community nations. In 1968, a Trade Union Committee for the European Free Trade Area (EFTA-TUC) was also established.

The ERO became marginalised, and after its general secretary, Walter Schevenels, died in 1966, its affiliates discussed a reorganisation, whereby the ETUS and the EFTA-TUC would affiliate to the ERO, and the ETUS general secretary would become the secretary of the ERO. The proposal was rejected, and instead a plan was drawn up for the ERO to act as a liaison group between the ETUS and EFTA-TUC. There proved little need for an organisation to fill this role, and so in 1969 the ERO was dissolved. In 1973, the European Trade Union Confederation was established, to fill a similar role.

== Leadership ==
=== General Secretaries ===
1950: Walter Schevenels
1966: Charles Ford (acting)

=== Presidents ===
1950: Charles Geddes
1957: Alfred Roberts
1963: Frederick Hayday
