= Landsorganisationen =

Landsorganisationen translates into English as "the national organisation" and is a term used for the blue-collar trade union confederations in Scandinavia. It may refer to:

- LO (Landsorganisationen i Danmark) - The Danish Confederation of Trade Unions
- LO (Landsorganisationen i Sverige) - The Swedish Trade Union Confederation

and, with an alternate spelling, to:

- LO (Landsorganisasjonen i Norge) - The Norwegian Trade Union Confederation
