= RBF =

RBF may refer to:

== Organizations ==
- Rassemblement Bruxelles-France, a Belgian political party
- Reserve Bank of Fiji
- Former Restaurant Trade Union, Denmark
- Rockefeller Brothers Fund, a philanthropic foundation
- Russian Basketball Federation

== Places ==
- Big Bear City Airport, California, US, IATA code RBF
- Rangierbahnhof, a railway marshalling yard in Germany

== Technologies and science ==
- Radial basis function in mathematics
  - Radial basis function kernel or RBF kernel
- Random Block File, an OS-9 file manager
- Rat-bite fever, a disease in humans
- Renal blood flow, a measure of blood delivered to the kidneys
- Revenue based financing, a company financing method
- Rubidium fluoride, chemical formula RbF

== Other uses ==
- Reel Big Fish, a ska-punk band
- Resting bitch face, an unintentionally annoyed-looking facial expression
