= Akademikerne – The Danish Confederation of Professional Associations =

Danish trade union federation

Akademikerne (AC)
- Akademikerne – The Danish Confederation of Professional Associations
- Akademikerne (AC)
- Founded: 1972
- Headquarters: Copenhagen, Denmark
- Location: Denmark
- Members: 480,000 (2023)
- Key people: President Lisbeth Lintz (MD, specialized in geriatrics and internal medicine)
- Affiliations: ITUC, ETUC, TUAC, NFS
- Website: ac.dk

Akademikerne – The Danish Confederation of Professional Associations Danish: Akademikerne was founded in 1972 and a national trade union center for 25 Danish trade unions.

Akademikerne has a membership of 418,000 and cooperates with the other Danish trade union centre, the Danish Trade Union Confederation (FH).

Members of the 25 trade unions of Akademikerne are typically employees with a higher education, i.e. a master's degree or a postgraduate education. Members of Akademikerne are e.g. lawyers, librarians, psychologists, dentists, veterinarians, pharmacists, high school teachers, medical doctors etc.

Akademikerne is affiliated with the International Trade Union Confederation (ITUC), the European Trade Union Confederation (ETUC), the Trade Union Advisory Committee to the OECD (TUAC) and the Council of Nordic Trade Unions (NFS).

== Members ==
- Danish Union of Architects
- sh Union of Librarians
- Dansk Kiroprator Forening
- Dansk Magisterforening
- Dansk Mejeriingeniør Forening
- Dansk Musikpædagogisk Forening
- Dansk Organist og Kantor Samfund
- Dansk Psykolog Forening
- De Offentlige Tandlæger
- De Offentlige Tandlæger
- Den Danske Dyrlægeforening
- Den danske Præsteforening
- Forbundet Kommunikation og Sprog
- Foreningen af Akademisk Uddannede DJ-medlemmer
- Foreningen af Kliniske Diætister
- Foreningen af Skibsinspektører i Søfartsstyrelsen
- Foreningen af Speciallæger
- Forsvarsgruppen i AC
- Gymnasieskolernes Lærerforening
- Handelsskolernes Lærerforening, Adjunkt/lektorgruppen
- Danish Society of Engineers
- JA
- Danish Medical Association
- Pharmadanmark
- Praktiserende Lægers Organisation
- Tandlægeforeningen
- Yngre Læger

== See also ==
- FTF – Confederation of Professionals in Denmark
- LO, The Danish Confederation of Trade Unions
