= Carl Madsen (trade unionist) =

Danish trade unionist and politician

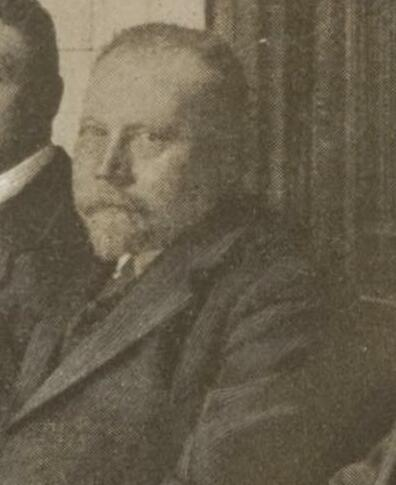
Carl F. Madsen (1917)

Carl Frederik Madsen (17 November 1862 – 27 May 1944) was a Danish trade unionist and politician.

Madsen worked as a cobbler, and became chair of the Danish Shoemakers' Union. In 1908, he became the secretary of the Danish Confederation of Trade Unions, serving until 1928. In 1920, he was appointed as a Social Democrats member of the Landstinget, serving until 1936.

In 1927, Madsen was elected as a vice-president of the International Federation of Trade Unions, but resigned the following year.

Trade union offices
Preceded by Christian Martin Olsen	General Secretary of the Danish Confederation of Trade Unions; 1908–1928	Succeeded by Vilhelm Nygaard
