= HAF =

HAF may refer to:

- the Haftar Armed Forces, the United Nations term for the Libyan National Army, a group of armed forces in Libya opposed to the Government of National Accord roughly from 2016–present
- Haiphong Sign Language
- Half Moon Bay Airport, in San Mateo County, California, United States
- Headquarters, United States Air Force
- Heathrow Terminal 4 railway station, in London
- Hellenic Air Force
- Helms Athletic Foundation
- Heydar Aliyev Foundation
- Hindu American Foundation, an American Hindutva organization affiliated with the Sangh Parivar
- Homeworkers' Union, a former trade union in Denmark
- Honduran Air Force
