= TKF =

TKF can stand for:

- Telecommunications Union, former Danish trade union
- Turkish Communist Party (official), political party briefly active from 1920
