= Dirk Nak =

Dutch trade union leader, active in Denmark

Dirk Nak (1884 or 1885 – 2 May 1967) was a Dutch trade union leader, active in Denmark.

Born in the Netherlands, Nak became a cigar maker. In 1913, he moved to Denmark, where he carried on in the same trade, joining the Danish Tobacco Workers' Union. In 1917, he was elected to the union executive, and in 1938, he was elected as president of the union, also serving on the executive of the Danish Confederation of Trade Unions, and as president of the International Federation of Tobacco Workers. He stood down from the international in 1952, but held the other positions until his retirement in 1955. He was also active in the Social Democrats, and from 1945 to 1958 sat on the Copenhagen City Council.

Trade union offices
Preceded by Edmund Olsen	President of the Danish Tobacco Workers' Union; 1938–1955	Succeeded by Marinus Christensen
Preceded by Edmund Olsen	President of the International Federation of Tobacco Workers; 1938–1952	Succeeded by Alfons van Uytven
