= PMF =

PMF may stand for:

== Military ==
- Paramilitary forces, a semi-militarized force
- Private military firm, a private company providing armed combat or security services for financial gain.
- Popular Mobilization Forces, an Iraqi state-sponsored umbrella organization

== Science and technology ==
- Peptide mass fingerprinting, an analytical technique for protein identification
- Polarization-maintaining optical fiber, a type of optical fiber
- Polycarbon monofluoride, a graphite compound with fluorine; also known as carbon monofluoride
- Potential of mean force, in chemistry, potential giving the average force on a particle from a set of molecules
- Primary myelofibrosis, a disease affecting the bone marrow
- Probability mass function, in statistics, function giving the probability that a variable takes a particular value
- Progressive massive fibrosis, an interstitial lung disease complication often seen in silicosis and pneumoconiosis
- Protected Management Frames, a security feature of WiFi connections, see IEEE 802.11w-2009
- Proton motive force, a measure of energy in biological reactions

== Other uses ==
- Danish Union of Educators (Danish: Pædagogisk Medhjælper Forbund), a former Danish trade union
- Pacific Music Festival, an international classical music festival held annually in Sapporo, Japan
- Faculty of Science, University of Zagreb (Croatian: Prirodoslovno-matematički fakultet), a university faculty
- Parma Airport, Italy (IATA airport code)
- Pierre Mendès France (1907–1982), Prime Minister of France
- Presidential Management Fellows Program, a US government fellowship
- Product–market fit, in marketing, the degree to which a product satisfies a strong market demand
- Professional Medical Film, a U.S. Army designation
- PMF, hacker turned as federal informant (operation Cybersnare)
- .pmf, a Sony PlayStation Portable movie file, a proprietary format that can be extracted from PSP disk images
