= Olivia Nielsen =

Danish politician and trade unionist

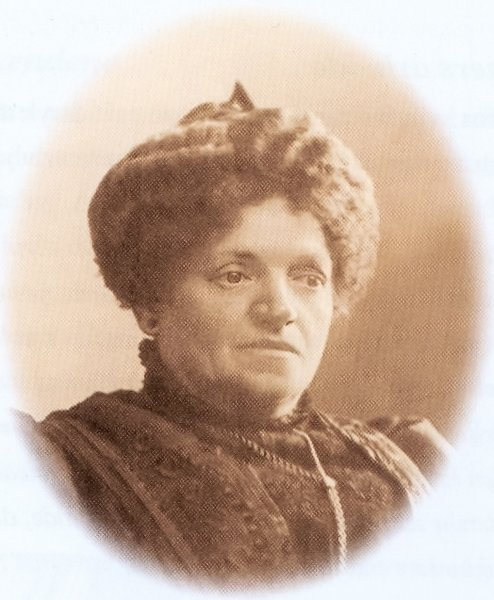
Olivia Nielsen

Anna Olivia Nielsen, née Christensen, (1852–1910) was a Danish trade unionist and politician. Under her leadership, the Danish Women Workers Union (KAD) gained prominence as agreements resulted from effective strike action. Founded 1901, Nielsen chaired the organisation until her death in 1910.

== Biography ==
Born in Helsingør on 7 June 1873, Nielsen was the daughter of Jørgen Christensen, a farmhand, and his wife Anne Marie Olsdatter. Brought up in a working-class environment, she married the factory worker Oluf Nielsen when she was 20 and already pregnant. She went on to have nine children, two of whom died in infancy. In order to provide for the children, Nielsen was forced to work in Helsingør, probably as a laundress. In the 1880s, the family moved to Copenhagen where it was easier to find work.

== Union work ==
In Copenhagen, Nielsen became associated with the Kvindeligt Arbejderforbund (KAF) which was founded in 1885 as a union for cleaners and washerwomen and from 1890 for women industrial workers. In 1891, Nielsen became a member of the union's steering committee and in 1892 its president. She introduced a more structured approach with monthly meetings and membership fees, resolving the association's financial problems. Over the following years, she arranged information meetings with prominent speakers, including Johanne Meyer of the Kvindelig Fremskridtsforening (Women's Progressive Society) and M.C. Lyngsie, head of the working men's organization Arbejdsmændenes Forbund. As a result, women joined from various branches of industry such as breweries, printing works, ropemaking and cable factories.

The KAF's first successful wage agreement was concluded in 1986 with the Tuborg Breweries but negotiations with Jacob Holm og Sønners Reberbane, a ropeworks, proved more difficult. After a seven-week strike and a court case for the KAF's defamatory press articles, there was nevertheless a settlement. In the late 1890s, provincial branches of the KAF were established in Randers, Svendborg, Næstved and Køge. By 1900, the organization had around 1,000 members. This led in 1901 to the launching of the Danish Women Workers' Union (KAD), the first formal national trade union for women in the country. Nielsen served as secretary general of the KAD while maintaining leadership of its Copenhagen branch. By the time of her death in 1910, KAD membership had increased to 2,000. Nielsen also served as a council member of De samvirkende Fagforbund (Federation of Danish Trade Unions) established in 1898, becoming a member of the executive committee in 1909.

== Politics ==
Nielsen was a supporter of the Socialdemokratiske arbejderbevægelse (Social Democratic Workers Movement), addressing a May Day demonstration in Copenhagen in 1899 together with Andrea Brochman leader of De kvindelige Herreskrædderes Fagforening (Women's Union of Men's Tailors). In 1909, after women were permitted to participate in local elections, she was co-convenor of a meeting of women workers, later serving as a Social Democratic member of the municipal council along with two other women trade unionists, Henriette Crone and Anna Johansen.

== Death and assessment ==
Olivia Nielsen died on 11 July 1910 while she was in Aarhus in connection with a congress of the Dansk Arbejdsmandsforbund (Union of Unskilled Labourers). On her deathbed, she encouraged the executive committee to continue her life's work and successfully urged them to elect her daughter Gudrun Bodø as her successor. She is now considered to have been one of the most prominent pioneers of the Danish women's trade union movement, succeeding in improving unskilled women's pay and working conditions.
