= Danish Municipal Workers' Union =

Danish trade union

The Danish Municipal Workers' Union (Danish: Dansk Kommunalarbejder Forbunds, DKF) was a trade union representing local government workers in Denmark.

The union was established on 19 March 1899 by 47 workers, as the Copenhagen Municipal Workers' Union. In 1920, it began recruiting members across the country, and adopted its final name.

In its early years, the union frequently came into conflict with the Danish General Workers' Union, which wished to organised members by their grade of work, rather than by employer. As a result, the DKF was not initially permitted to affiliate to the Danish Confederation of Trade Unions. In 1964, it changed its name again, becoming the Public Employees' Union - Danish Municipal Workers' Union, and for the first time accepted other public sector workers into membership. By 1991, the union had 119,444 members, of whom 5% worked on local transport. 81% of members were women.

From the 1980s, changes in the health and social care sectors led the union to compete for members with the Homeworkers' Union. In December 1992, the two merged, to form the Union of Public Employees (FOA).

== Presidents ==
1899: Alfred Jensen
1901: Carl Pedersen
1915: T. Thomsen
1936: Rasmus Olsen
1948: A. C. Hansen
1960: Helmuth Andersen
1969: Jørgen Knudsen
1980: Poul Winckler
