= Danish Central Organisation of Telecommunication Employees =

Danish trade union

The Danish Central Organisations of Telecommunications Employees (Danish: Centralorganisationen for Telefonstanden i Danmark, COTD) was a trade union representing workers in the communications industry in Denmark.

The union was founded in 1909 as the Central Organisation of Telephone Workers. It was led by Alfred Nielsen, who travelled the country setting up branches and negotiating improved pay and conditions for workers. The joined the Danish Confederation of Trade Unions (LO), but left again, rejoining in 1982. While its membership at one time was over 10,000, by 1982, it was down to just 4,881.

In 1994, the COTD merged with five small unions which held membership of the Confederation of Professionals in Denmark, forming the Telecommunications Union.

== Presidents ==
1909: Alfred Nielsen
1953: E. Jensen
1960: Christian Nielsen
1966:
