= Hans Jacobsen =

Hans Jacobsen may refer to:

- Hans Jacobsen (sport shooter) (1881–1945), Danish sports shooter
- Hans Jacobsen (trade unionist) (1872–1943), Danish trade union leader
- Hans Fredrik Jacobsen (born 1954), Norwegian musician and composer
- Hans Sivert Jacobsen (1836–1901), Norwegian politician

== See also ==
- Hans Jacobson (1947–1984), Swedish pentathlete
- Hans Jakobsen (1895–1980), Danish gymnast
