= Charles Ford (trade unionist) =

British trade union leader

Charles H. Ford (29 November 1923 – 12 March 2000) was a British trade union leader.

Born in Hackney, Ford studied at the Central School of Arts and Crafts. He became an engraver at the Royal Mint, but soon left due to poor eyesight, and in 1940 began working for the Czechoslovak government-in-exile, then after the war worked in Yugoslavia. He developed an interest in economics, and studied at the London School of Economics, then found work as an economist for the Amalgamated Engineering Union. He also joined the Labour Party, and stood unsuccessfully for it at the 1951 UK general election in Wimbledon, and then at the 1955 UK general election in Bournemouth West, without success.

In 1957, Ford moved to Paris to work for the trade union liaison council for the Marshall Plan, which he helped transform into the Trade Union Advisory Committee (TUAC). He promoted the role of the International Labour Organization in regulating international companies, and invented the phrase "social clause". In 1966, he was elected as general secretary of TUAC, serving until 1971, and he also became the acting general secretary of the ICFTU European Regional Organisation until its dissolution in 1969. In 1971, he moved to become general secretary of the International Textile, Garment and Leather Workers' Federation, in which role he helped build unions around the world, and doubled the federation's membership. He retired in 1988.

Trade union offices
Preceded by Walter Schevenels	General Secretary of the Trade Union Advisory Committee; 1966–1971	Succeeded by Henri Bernard
Preceded by Walter Schevenels	Acting General Secretary of the ICFTU European Regional Organisation; 1966–1969	Organisation dissolved
Preceded by Jack Greenhalgh	General Secretary of the International Textile, Garment and Leather Workers' Federation; 1971–1988	Succeeded by Neil Kearney
