= Mette Groes =

Danish politician (1937–2014)

Mette Groes (1937–2014) was a Danish politician, social worker and lecturer at Aalborg University. Representing the Social Democrats, she was a temporary member of the Folketing (1977– 1987) and a member of the European Parliament (1979–1980). Committed to equal rights for men and women, her many publications include the book Hustruvold (Violence against Wives, 2001).

== Biography ==
Born in the Copenhagen district of Frederiksberg on 9 June 1937, Mette Groes was the daughter of FDB director Ebbe Groes and his wife, Lis née Tørsleff, former Minister of Trade and Industry. She was the eldest of the family's nine children. A keen reader from an early age, after graduating from high school she first studied libranianship but quickly turned to social work.

== Career ==
Groes first was first employed in Copenhagen as a social worker for the Modrehjælpen (mothers' help) organization and shortly afterwards at Bispebjerg Hospital where she moved into leadership. For the benefit of patients, she initiated collaboration between the authorities responsible for social work and the hospital management,

After courses in social work were introduced at Aalborg University in 1971, Groes was invited to participate. In 1974, she became a lecturer and helped to develop a programme of study in social work. She was attached to the university until 2002.

As a result of her commitment to social equality, she joined the Social Democrats, where she served as a member between February 1977 and September 1987. From July 1979 to September 1980, she was a member of the Socialist Group at the European Parliament.

Groes was twice a member of the Aalborg City Council, in 1974––78 and in 1989–93. She also served on the board of the Danish Association of Social Workers and from 1970 to 1973 she was vice president of the Danish Women's Society. Among her publications is the book Hustruvold: socialrådgivens arbejdsmetoder (2001) on how to combat violence suffered by housewives.

Mette Groes died in Gentofte on 8 November 2014 and is buried in Aalborg's Dokkedal Cemetery.
