= Danish Hairdressers' and Beauticians' Union =

Hairdressers Union in Denmark

The Danish Hairdressers' and Beauticians' Union (Danish: Dansk Frisør og Kosmetikerforbund, DFKF) was a trade union representing workers in the beauty industry in Denmark.

== History ==
The union was founded on 5 June 1911, as the Barbers' and Hairdressers' Association of Denmark. It affiliated to the Danish Confederation of Trade Unions (LO), and to the International Union of Hairdressers. It was led for many years by H. M. Christensen, who also organised the Figaro hair salons, where journeymen hairdressers could rent a chair. This dual role led to conflict, and some hairdressers attempted to set up a breakaway union, but this soon collapsed.

In 1945, the union was expelled from LO for refusing to agree to longer working hours and the abolition of equal pay between men and women. It finally rejoined in 1967. In 2013, the union had 4,033 members. That year, the union merged into the Services Union, becoming one of the larger sections of that union.

== Presidents ==
1911: V. Reinvall-Hansen
1915: H. M. Christensen
1958: Arnold Hansen
1992: Poul Monggaard
2013: Lone Nordentoft Frost
