= Danish Textile Workers' Union =

Trade union in Denmark

The Danish Textile Workers' Union (Danish: Dansk Textilarbejderforbund, DTAF) was a trade union representing workers in the textile industry in Denmark.

The origins of the union lie in the men's hand weavers' society formed in Copenhagen in 1873. The decline of handloom weaving led it, in 1884, to begin accepting both industrial weavers and women as members. In 1885, small unions in Horsens and Odense joined the Copenhagen union, and in 1885 it founded the new Danish Weavers' Union.

In its first decade, the union grew very slowly, frequently organising strikes which it struggled to fund. In 1892, it created a strike fund, and began negotiating wage agreements with employers, and in 1895 it changed its name to the "Danish Textile Workers' Union". In 1898, it signed a national agreement with the new Textile Manufacturers' Federation, and that year it also became a founder member of the Danish Confederation of Trade Unions (LO).

Union membership peaked in 1951, but then fell rapidly, as employment in the industry declined. In 1973, the small Danish Rope Makers' Union merged into DTAF. By 1977, the union had 16,442 members, of whom two-thirds were women. The following year, it merged with the Danish Clothing Workers' Union, to form the Danish Clothing and Textile Workers' Union.
