= Danish Medical Journal =

- Discipline: Medicine
- Language: English
- Edited by: Anja Pinborg

Publication details
- Former name(s): Danish Medical Bulletin
- History: 1954-present
- Publisher: Danish Medical Association
- Frequency: Monthly
- Impact factor: 1.07 (2014)

Standard abbreviations
- ISO 4: Dan. Med. J.

Indexing
- ISSN: 2245-1919

Links
- Journal homepage; Online archive

The Danish Medical Journal is a monthly peer-reviewed general medical journal published by the Danish Medical Association. It was established in 1954 as the Danish Medical Bulletin, obtaining its current name effective with the January 2012 issue. The editor-in-chief is Anja Pinborg (Hvidovre Hospital). According to the Journal Citation Reports, the journal has a 2015 impact factor of 1.07.
