= Kirsten Stallknecht =

Danish nurse (1937–2021)

Kirsten Stallknecht (1937 – 4 May 2021) was a Danish nurse who served as President of the International Council of Nurses. She received the 2013 Christiane Reimann prize from the ICN. Stallknecht was made a Knight of the Order of the Dannebrog and a Knight of the 1st degree. A prize offered in her name rewards nurses who engage in free speech.

== Early life and education ==
Stallknecht, who was from Copenhagen, was born in 1937 and educated at Husum School. She initially worked as a nanny in Switzerland. She started her nursing education in 1956 in Holbæk and then qualified as a nurse at the Rigshospitalet in 1960. In 1965 she studied teaching and management at the Danish College of Nursing at Aarhus University.

== Nursing career ==
Stallknecht worked at the Rigshospitalet, and was elected to the executive of the Danish Nurses' Organization (DSR) in 1966. In 1967 she became Chair, following the resignation of long-time leader Maria Madsen.[DWB] Stallknecht remained the Chairperson for 28 years. During her tenure, she reorganised the professional association to also function as a nurses’ union, winning the right to dispute, and state recognition of the Nurses' Unemployment Fund. In 1980 Stallknecht established the Danish Institute for Health and Nursing Research. Stallknecht served as President of the International Council of Nurses from 1997 to 2001.

After a long illness, Stallknecht died on 4 May 2021 at the age of 83.

== Recognition ==
Stallknecht was awarded the 2013 Christiane Reimann Prize from the ICN.

Stallknecht was made a Knight of the Order of the Dannebrog in 1990 and a Knight of the 1st degree in 1996.

In 2001 the Kirsten Stallknecht Award was established "to build a bridge between nursing, journalism and freedom of expression. The prize is intended to encourage nurses to exercise their constitutionally guaranteed freedom of expression without fear of the consequences of coming forward".

Trade union offices
Preceded by Jens Christensen	President of the Confederation of Professionals in Denmark; 1977–1984	Succeeded by Martin Rømer
