= Rudolf Tayerlé =

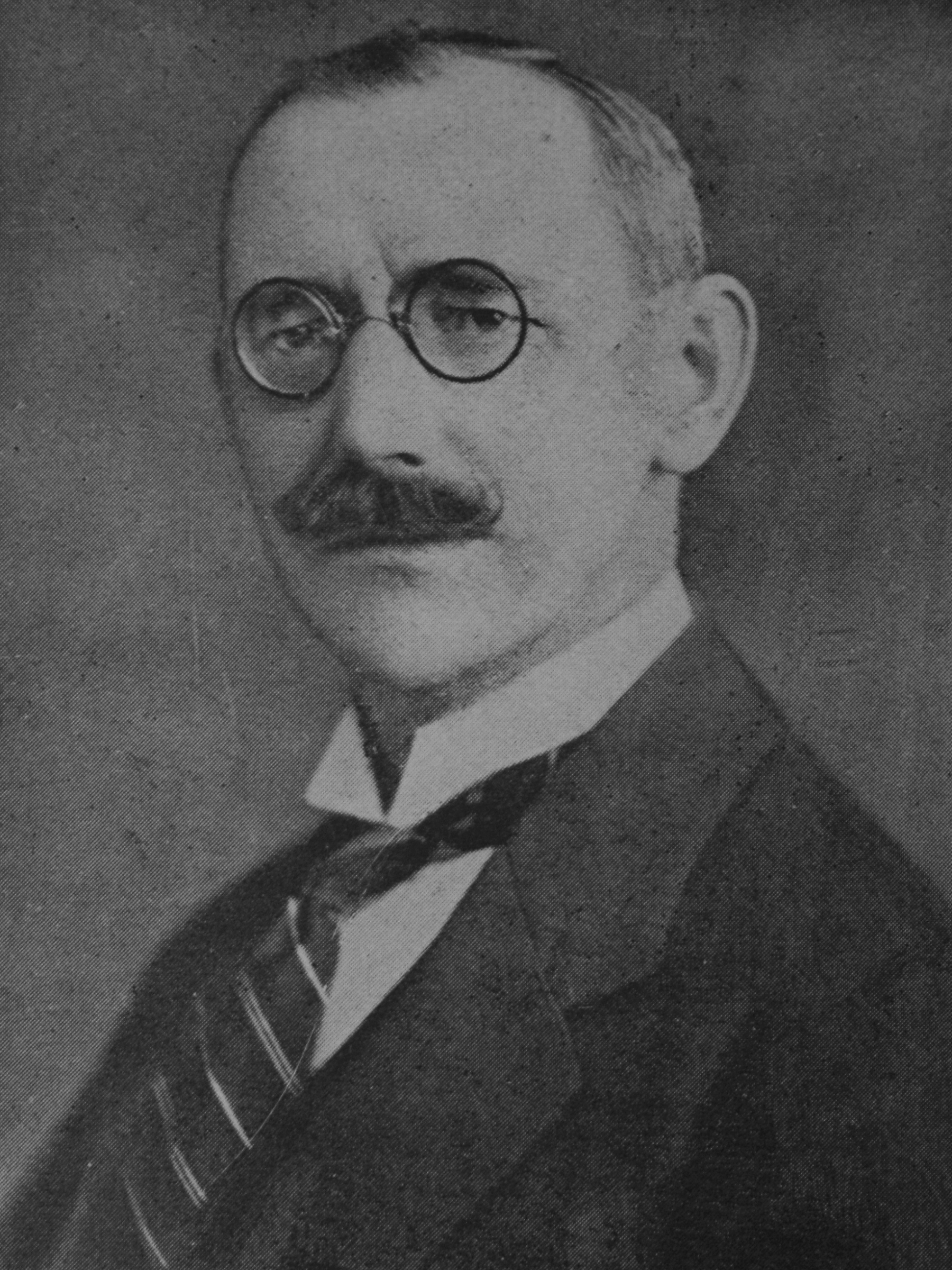
Rudolf Tayerle

Rudolf Tayerlé (1877–1942) was a Czechoslovak Social Democratic politician and trade union leader. In 1922 he was instrumental in expelling the communists from the Odborové sdružení českoslovanské. In 1942 he was elected vice-president of the International Federation of Trade Unions. Tayerlé was arrested shortly after the German invasion of Czechoslovakia. He died in the Mauthausen-Gusen concentration camp.
