= Danish Tin and Plumbing Workers' Union =

Danish labor union

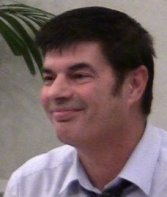
Max Meyer, former chairman of the Danish Zionist Association and the Tin and Pipe Workers' Association in Denmark.

The Danish Tin and Plumbing Workers' Union (Danish: Blik- og Rørarbejderforbundet, Blik og Rør) is a trade union representing sheet metal workers and plumbers in Denmark.

The union was founded in 1890, as the Danish Sheet Metal Workers' Union. In 1969, the Plumbers' Association merged in to the union, which in 1981 adopted its current name. In 1994, the Chimney Sweeps' Union also merged in to the union.

As of 2018, the union has 8,475 members. Many are part of one of four sections: chimney sweeps, ventilation engineers, public workers, and sheet metal workers. The union was affiliated to the Danish Confederation of Trade Unions for many years, and since 2019 has been affiliated to its successor, the Danish Trade Union Confederation.
