= Danish Postal Union =

Danish trade union

The Danish Postal Union (Danish: Dansk Postforbund, DPF) was a trade union representing people working for the Postvæsenet department of the Danish government.

The union was founded in 1908, and affiliated to the Danish Confederation of Trade Unions (LO). It represented blue collar workers, such as delivery and sorting staff.

In 1995, Post Danmark was established, to take over the Danish postal service. The DPF objected to the change, and refused to co-operate with the new organisation in implementing changes to working practices. Newly recruited staff were placed on contracts, rather than becoming civil servants. Under LO rules, this meant they were not eligible to join the DPF, instead joining the Danish General Workers' Union (SID). This led membership of the DPF to decline rapidly, and at the start of 2001, the DPF merged into the SID.
