= Danish Artist Union =

Danish trade union

- Dansk Artist Forbund
- Abbreviation: DAF
- Predecessor: International Artist Lodge
- Established: 1918; 108 years ago
- Founded at: Copenhagen
- Type: Trade union=
- Location: Denmark
- Fields: Variety artists, musicians
- Members: 1,150 (2018)
- Key people: Willy Torp, Willy Manley
- Affiliations: Danish Trade Union Confederation (FH)
- Website: www.artisten.dk

The Danish Artist Union (Danish: Dansk Artist Forbund, DAF) is a trade union representing variety performers and musicians in Denmark.

The International Artist Lodge was established in 1901, but ceased to function during World War I. In 1918, 25 artists met at the Café National in Copenhagen, and founded the Danish Artist Union, initially led by Willy Torp, a contortionist and comic juggler. The union affiliated to the Danish Confederation of Trade Unions (LO) in 1953, but remained very small. It had only 200 members in 1954, at which time it was led by Willy Manley.

In 1958, the union established an unemployment fund, and this encouraged many actors to join the union. However, in 1974, the Danish Actors' Association set up its own unemployment fund, and since then, few actors have joined DAF.

LO became part of the Danish Trade Union Confederation (FH) in 2019, to which DAF is now affiliated. As of 2018, the union had 1,150 members.

== See also ==
- American Guild of Variety Artists
- Variety Artistes' Federation
