= Food Union NNF =

Danish trade union

NNF
- Food Union NNF
- Fødevareforbundet NNF
- Founded: 1980
- Headquarters: Frederiksberg, Denmark
- Location: Denmark
- Members: 17,095 (2018)
- Key people: Ole Wehlast, president
- Affiliations: FH, IUF
- Website: www.nnf.dk

The Food Union NNF (Danish: Fødevareforbundet NNF) is a trade union representing food and tobacco workers in Denmark.

The union was founded in 1980, when the Bakery, Pastry and Mill Workers' Union merged with the Danish Union of Slaughterhouse Workers, the Danish Tobacco Workers' Union, and the Confectionery and Chocolate Workers' Union. They formed the Danish Food and Allied Workers' Union (NNF), and in 1983, the Association of Dairy Workers also merged in. In 2009, the union shortened its name, to become the "Food Union NNF".

Like its predecessors, the union affiliated to the Danish Confederation of Trade Unions, and since 2019 has been a member of its successor, the Danish Trade Union Confederation. In 1997, it had 41,913 members, but by 2018, membership had dropped to only 17,095.
