= Danish Bookbinders' and Stationers' Union =

The Danish Bookbinders' and Stationers' Union (Danish: Dansk Bogbinder og Kartonnagearbejder Forbund) was a trade union representing bookbinders and workers involved in making stationery in Denmark.

The union was founded in 1895 and it soon affiliated to the Danish Confederation of Trade Unions, and also to the International Federation of Bookbinders and Kindred Trades. By 1954, the union had 7,122 members.

In 1962, the union formed the Graphic Workers' Cartel with the Danish Lithographers' Union, and the Danish Typographical Union. However, this loose federation made no progress, and in 1965, the typographers resigned from the LO and the cartel. They rejoined LO in 1971, forming a new Graphics Cartel in 1972, but again this ran into disputes, and was dissolved in 1980. Finally, in 1990, the bookbinders, lithographers, typographers and the Media Federation formed a Graphic Industry and Media Cartel. In 1993, the four unions merged, to form the new Graphics Federation.
