= Danish Police Federation =

Danish police union

The Danish Police Federation (Danish: Politiforbundet i Danmark is a trade union representing police in Denmark.

The union was founded in either 1998 or 1999, with the merger of the original Danish Police Federation, the Danish Criminal Police Federation, and the Police and Civil Service Association. The union joined the Confederation of Professionals in Denmark, and since 2019 it has been affiliated to its successor, the Danish Trade Union Confederation. The union is also a member of the Civil Servants' Central Organization II. In 2018, it had 11,815 members.
