= Danish Union of Bricklayers =

The Danish Union of Bricklayers (Danish: Murerforbundet i Danmark, Murer) was a trade union representing bricklayers in Denmark.

The union was founded in 1887, and in 1898 it affiliated to the Danish Confederation of Trade Unions (LO). It left the LO again in 1912, but rejoined in 1935.

By 1993, employment in the construction industry had declined, and the union had only 13,104 members. The following year, it merged into the Danish General Workers' Union.
