= Hans Jacobsen (trade unionist) =

Danish trade unionist (1872–1943)

Hans Jacobsen (26 December 1872 – 1943) was a Danish trade unionist.

Born in Aarhus, Jacobsen completed an apprenticeship as a tailor, and worked in Norway, Germany and Switzerland, before returning to Aarhus. There, he joined a local union of tailors. In 1905, he was elected as the union's president, and then in 1914 he became the full-time secretary of the national tailors' federation.

In 1919, Jacobsen began working full-time for the Danish Confederation of Trade Unions, becoming a vice president in 1928 then, in 1929, its treasurer. In 1928, he became a vice president of the International Federation of Trade Unions, and also served on its executive.

Jacobsen retired from all his union positions in 1940 and died three years later.
