= Confederación Obrera Ibero Americana =

Ibero-American trade union confederation

Confederación Obrera Ibero Americana was a short-lived Ibero-American trade union confederation, formed by the International Federation of Trade Unions at a meeting in Buenos Aires, Argentina, in 1928. Participants at the founding conference were the Confederación Obrera Argentina and pro-government trade unionists from Venezuela, Uruguay, Cuba and Spain.
