= Danish Union of Joiners =

Trade union in Denmark

The Danish Union of Joiners (Danish: Snedkerforbundet i Danmark, SF) was a trade union representing joiners and cabinetmakers in Denmark.

The union was founded in 1885, and was an early member of the Danish Confederation of Trade Unions (LO). By 1969, it had 16,057 members. The following year, it merged with the Danish Carpenters' Union, to form the Danish Union of Joiners and Carpenters.
