= Danish Union of Architects =

Trade union in Denmark

ARKITEKTFORBUNDET
- Danish Union of Architects
- Arkitektforbundet
- Headquarters: Copenhagen, Denmark
- Location: Denmark
- Members: 4,500
- Key people: Mette Carstad, Chairman
- Affiliations: AC
- Website: www.arkitektforbundet.dk

The Danish Union of Architects is a trade union in Denmark. It has a membership of 4,500 and is affiliated with the Danish Confederation of Professional Associations.
