= Diet and Nutrition Association =

The Diet and Nutrition Association (Danish: Kost- og Ernæringsforbundet, KOST) is a trade union representing nutritionists and people in related jobs, in Denmark.

The union was founded in 1923, as the Food Economists' Association, and adopted its current name in 2005. Long a member of the Confederation of Professionals in Denmark, since 2019 it has been affiliated to its successor, the Danish Trade Union Confederation. It had about 9,000 members in 2006, and 8,230 members in 2018.
