= Danish Musicians' Union =

Danish trade union

The Danish Musicians' Union (Danish: Dansk Musiker Forbund, DMF) is a trade union representing musicians in Denmark.

The union was founded in 1911, bringing together 26 orchestra associations totalling 2,000 members, half of whom were based in Copenhagen. By 2009, its membership was 6,700, although most soloists and organists were members of other, smaller, unions.

The association was affiliated to the Confederation of Professionals in Denmark for many years, and since 2019 has been part of its successor, the Danish Trade Union Confederation.
