= Danish Clothing and Textile Workers' Union =

Danish trade union

The Danish Clothing and Textile Workers' Union (Danish: Dansk Beklædnings- og Textilarbejderforbund, DBT) was a trade union representing workers in the garment and textile industries in Denmark.

The union was founded in 1978, when the Danish Clothing Workers' Union merged with the Danish Textile Workers' Union. Like its predecessors, the union affiliated to the Danish Confederation of Trade Unions (LO). In 1983, it absorbed the Danish Shoemakers' Union. By 1996, the union had 17,229 members, of whom 76% were women. At the end of 1997, it merged into the Danish General Workers' Union.
