= Danish Tobacco Workers' Union =

Danish trade union

The Danish Tobacco Workers' Union (Danish: Tobaksarbejder Forbund i Danmark) was a trade union representing cigar and cigarette makers in Denmark.

Cigar makers in Copenhagen formed the Enigheden union in 1871, the country's first socialist trade union. On 21 August 1887, it merged with eleven other local unions, to form the Danish Tobacco Workers' Union. One of its early members was Thorvald Stauning, who later served as Prime Minister of Denmark.

While women were not initially admitted to the union, this soon changed, and by 1908, a majority of union members were women. The union affiliated to the Danish Confederation of Trade Unions and the International Federation of Tobacco Workers. Membership peaked after World War II at 10,000, but then declined in line with employment in the industry.

In 1963, Ella Jensen was elected as the union's president, the first woman to lead a Danish union which men could join. By 1980, membership was little more than 2,000, and the union merged with the Bakery, Pastry and Mill Workers' Union, the Danish Union of Slaughterhouse Workers, and the Confectionery and Chocolate Workers' Union, to form the Danish Food and Allied Workers' Union.

== Presidents ==
Edmund Olsen
1938: Dirk Nak
1955: Marinus Christensen
1963: Ella Jensen
1975:
