= PROSA =

PROSA is a trade union representing information technology workers in Denmark.

== History ==
The union was founded on 15 February 1967, by about 25 programmers and systems analysts at Scandinavian Airlines (SAS), its name loosely standing for "Programs and Systems Analysts Association in SAS". It quickly concluded an agreement with SAS. The following year, programmers at Datacentralen joined the association, then in 1969, PROSA established itself on a national basis, setting up a branch which any programmers or systems analysts could join.

While PROSA was the first union dedicated to IT workers in Denmark, some workers in the industry were members of the Danish Union of Commercial and Clerical Employees (HK). In 1971, HK formed SAMDATA, a dedicated section for IT workers, and competed fiercely with PROSA for members. Despite this, PROSA grew steadily, reaching 1,000 members by 1976, and 5,000 in 1986. In 1971, it launched a magazine, also entitled PROSA, and in 1972 it made its president a part-time member of staff, becoming full-time the following year.

PROSA affiliated to the Confederation of Professionals in Denmark (FTF) in the late 1960s, but was expelled in 1973 after refusing to accept FTF's demarcation agreement. It rejoined in 1996, and since 2019 has been a member of its successor, the Danish Trade Union Confederation (FH). By 2018, the union had 10,720 members.

== Presidents ==
1972: Anker Mørk Thomsen
1976: Erik Kristensen
1981: Hans Irgens
1985: Steffen Stripp
1990: Bodil Toft
1996: Peter Christensen
1999: Henrik Kroos
2002: Peter Ussing
2008: Niels Henrik Bertelsen
