= Telecommunications Union =

The Telecommunications Union (Danish: Telekommunikationsforbundet, TKF) was a trade union representing workers in the communications industry in Denmark.

The union was founded in 1994, when the Danish Central Organisation of Telecommunication Employees, an affiliate of the Danish Confederation of Trade Unions (LO), merged with five small unions which held membership of the Confederation of Professionals in Denmark. These five unions had previously worked together through the loose Association of Danish Teleworkers.

The new union had about 15,000 members, and chose to affiliate to LO. However, the union did not prove large enough to be sustainable. By 2002, it still had 13,000 members, but its leadership agreed to merge the union into the Danish Union of Metalworkers. The union's membership approved the merger in a vote in March 2003, and the merger took place on 1 April 2003.
