= Graphics Federation =

Defunct trade union in Denmark

The Graphics Federation (Danish: Grafisk Forbund, GF) was a trade union representing workers in the graphics and printing industries in Denmark.

For many years, the three main printing industry unions in Denmark, the Danish Bookbinders' and Stationers' Union, Danish Lithographers' Union and Danish Typographical Union, collaborated through a joint "Graphics Cartel" in the Danish Confederation of Trade Unions (LO). In 1980, the three nearly agreed a merger, but the Lithographers withdrew and both the merger and the cartel collapsed.

In 1990, a new Graphics and Media Cartel in LO was established by the three printing unions, and the Media Association, which represented photographers. This quickly achieved negotiating agreements with the Graphic Employers' Association and the Danish Newspapers' Union Negotiating Organisation. This success led, at the start of 1993, to the merger of the four unions into the new "Graphics Federation".

As of 1997, the union had 22,987 members, but this fell rapidly as the union struggled to adapt to technological changes in the industry. The union dissolved at the end of 1999, with the bulk of the membership - the bookbinders, lithographers and typographers - transferring to the Union of Commercial and Clerical Employees in Denmark. The stationery workers instead transferred to the Danish General Workers' Union, while the photographers moved to the Danish Union of Journalists.

== Presidents ==
1980: Tom Durbing
