= Christiane Reimann =

Danish nurse (1888–1979)

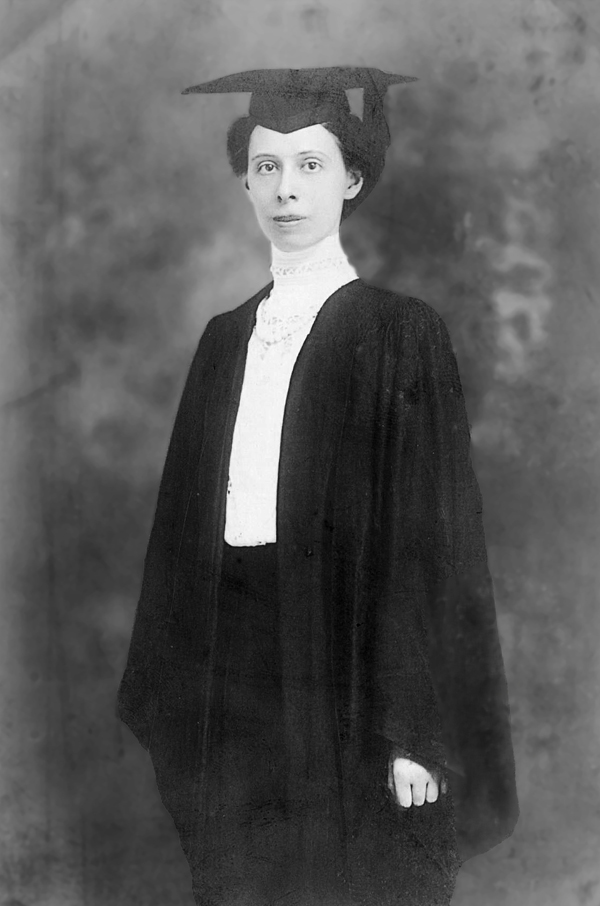
Christiane Elisabeth Reimann

Christiane Elisabeth Reimann (6 May 1888, Copenhagen - 12 April 1979, Syracuse, Sicily) was a Danish nurse. She is especially remembered for being the first Danish nurse with a graduate degree in nursing. She was the first paid secretary of the International Council of Nurses (ICN). The ICN's most prestigious award for nursing, the Christiane Reimann Prize, was established in her honor.

== Early life and education ==
Reimann was born on 6 May 1888 in Copenhagen, to stockbroker Carl Reimann and Margit Meisterlin. At the age of 25, and against her family's wishes, she trained as a nurse at a Bispebjerg Hospital in Copenhagen. Having finished her three years of nursing training in 1916, Reimann then trained as a teacher at Columbia University in New York, where she was a student of Mary Adelaide Nutting and Isabel Stewart. She earned a BS in 1921 and an MA in 1925.

== Nursing career ==
Reimann was elected secretary of the International Council of Nurses (ICN) in 1922, at the same time that Sophie Mannerheim was elected as president. The position was unpaid, but when Reimann was reelected in 1925, she was given the title Executive Secretary, and became the first paid secretary of the ICN.

Reimann was determined to make the ICN a recognised international voice for nurses. She set up a nursing advisory service for governments and health authorities, and created partnerships with other relevant international organisations. Independently wealthy, Reimann travelled extensively in Europe to visit ICN members. She also established, at her own expense, the ICN periodical, first called The Bulletin, and later the International Nursing Review.

Reimann resigned from the ICN in 1934, due to bad health, and disagreements with other ICN members. It was also announced that she married Wilhelm F. C. Alter that year. Reimann bought a property in Syracuse, Sicily. She established a prize, the Christiane Reimann prize, which was first awarded by the ICN in 1985, and which she intended to be ‘the Novel Prize of nursing’.

Reimann died 12 April 1979, Syracuse, Sicily.

== Reimann Award ==
The ICN's most prestigious award for nursing, the Christiane Reimann Prize, was established in her honor. Recipients of the award include:

- 1985: Virginia Henderson, USA
- 1989: Dame Nita Barrow, Barbados
- 1993: Dame Sheila Quinn, United Kingdom
- 1997: Dr Mo-Im Kim Kore, and Dr Hildegard Peplau, USA
- 2005: Dr Margretta Madden Styles, USA
- 2009: Dr Máximo A. González Jurado, Spain
- 2013: Kirsten Stallknecht, Denmark
- 2017: Dr Sheila Tlou, Botswana and Dr Linda Aiken, USA
- 2021: Dr Sheuan Lee, Taiwan Nurses Association
