= Fanny Jensen =

Danish politician

Fanny Jensen (1890–1969) was a Danish minister without portfolio and the first female holder of a political office in Denmark. Representing Socialdemokratiet, she was a member of parliament from 1947 to 1953. She worked at Kirks Telefonfabrikker in Horsens when she was young and was chairman of the union for women, the Danish Women Workers' Union, at its Horsens chapter from 1912 to 1935.
