= BUPL =

Danish labour union

The BUPL (from Danish: Børne- og UngdomsPædagogernes Landsforbund, Association of Child and Youth Educators), is a trade union representing education workers other than teachers, in Denmark.

The union was founded in 1972, when the Danish Child Care Council merged with the Danish Kindergarten Council and the Association of Leisure Educators. In 1974, it affiliated to the Confederation of Professionals in Denmark (FTF), and following the FTF's merger in 2019, it is affiliated to the Danish Trade Union Confederation (FH). Both the union's president, Elisa Rimpler, and its vice-president, Birgitte Conradsen, serve on the executive of the FH.

The union had 43,648 members by 1997, of whom 85% were women. By the end of 2018, this had risen to 55,480 members.
