= Danish Union of Joiners and Carpenters =

Danish trade union

The Danish Union of Joiners and Carpenters (Danish: Snedker- og Tømrerforbundet i Danmark, ST) was a trade union representing workers in construction and wood manufacturing in Denmark.

The union was founded in 1970, when the Danish Union of Joiners merged with the Danish Carpenters' Union. Like its predecessors, it affiliated to the Danish Confederation of Trade Unions. In 1984, the Saddlers' and Upholsterers' Union of Denmark also joined.

By 1996, the union had 47,448 members. At the start of 1997, it merged with the Danish Woodworkers' Union, to form the Danish Timber Industry and Construction Workers' Union.
