= Danish EL-Federation =

The Danish EL-Federation (Danish: Dansk El Forbund, DEF) is a trade union representing electricians and technicians in Denmark.

The union was founded 1 January 1904 as the Danish Union of Electricians, and affiliated to the Danish Confederation of Trade Unions (LO). By 1997, half of its members worked in construction, 30% in the metal industry, and most of the remainder in utilities and public administration.

By 2018, the union had 22,808 members. Since 2019, it has been affiliated to the Danish Trade Union Confederation, the successor of the LO.
