= Danish Union of Metalworkers =

Dansk Metal
- Danish Union of Metalworkers
- Dansk Metalarbejderforbund
- Founded: 1888
- Headquarters: Copenhagen, Denmark
- Location: Denmark
- Members: 142,000
- Key people: Claus Jensen (President)
- Affiliations: FH, IndustriALL
- Website: www.danskmetal.dk

The Danish Union of Metalworkers (Danish: Dansk Metal, Metal) is a trade union in Denmark. It principally represents workers in the metal industries, but also covers telecommunications, transportation and some other sectors.

== History ==
The union was founded in 1888, as the Danish Blacksmith and Machine Workers' Association. It became the "Danish Union of Metalworkers" in 1972.

Over the years, numerous smaller unions have merged in to the Metalworkers' union. These include:

- 1957: Semi-Skilled Metal Workers' Union
- 1967: Danish Metal Printers' Union
- 1968: Metal Workers' Union of Denmark
- 1969: Danish Coppersmiths' Union
- 1970: Danish Foundry Workers' Union
- 1972: Danish Boilermakers' Union
- 1976: Danish Vehicle Builders' Union
- 1976: Danish Ship Builders', Riggers' and Sailmakers' Union
- 1981: Danish Metal Grinders' Union
- 1984: Gold and Silver Workers' Union of Denmark
- 2003: Telecommunications Union
- 2011: Danish Ship Caterers' Union

== Affiliation ==
The union was long affiliated to the Danish Confederation of Trade Unions (LO), and for many years was its third-largest affiliate. Following LO's merger, in 2019, it is now affiliated to it successor, the Danish Trade Union Confederation (FH). It has also been affiliated to the European Metalworkers' Federation and the International Metalworkers' Federation, now part of the IndustriALL Global Union.

== Presidents ==
1888: Valdemar Olsen
1890: Ferdinand Hurop
1892: H. P. Hansen
1899: Jacob Anton Hansen
1926: Johannes Kjærbøl
1935: Peter Anders Andersen
1944: Hans Rasmussen
1972: Paulus Andersen
1978: Georg Poulsen
1991: Max Bæhring
2003: Thorkild E. Jensen
2012: Claus Jensen
