= Friedrich Etzkorn =

German trade union leader

Friedrich Etzkorn (13 April 1874 – 14 January 1946) was a German trade union leader.

Born in Kaiserslautern, Etzkorn completed an apprenticeship as a hairdresser, then travelled as a journeyman to the Rhein-Main area. In 1892, he joined the Union of German Barbers, Hairdressers and Wig Makers, and in 1893, he moved to Pforzheim, and formed a branch of the union there. Over the next two years, he was repeatedly sacked for union activity, and moved to new cities. In 1896, he was appointed as the editor of the union's newspaper, the Barbier- und Friseur-Zeitung, and moved to Berlin to undertake the role.

While Etzkorn was based in Berlin, the union's leader, Carl Wesche, was in Braunschweig, and at the end of the year, Etzkorn also moved there. The union steadily lost members, and by 1898 was in serious financial difficulties. Etzkorn returned to Pforzheim, and focused his time on the Social Democratic Party of Germany (SPD). Wesche was in serious disagreement with Etzkorn over the direction of the union, and in 1899, he had Etzkorn expelled.

Etzkorn remained a popular figure among union members, and was admitted to the Stuttgart branch, in defiance of Wesche. In 1900, Wesche was voted out of office, and Etzkorn was narrowly elected as his successor. He moved the union's headquarters to Hamburg, and polled 300 young union members on their experiences and priorities for the union. He focused on keeping the union united, and restricting the number of apprentices.

The union grew steadily under Etzkorn's leadership, from 869 members in 1905, to 2,500 in 1914. In 1907, Etzkorn persuaded members to move the headquarters to Berlin. That year, he also founded the International Union of Hairdressers, serving as its general secretary. He kept the union together during World War I, although the union had to give up its headquarters and make all its paid staff redundant. From 1916, he supported himself by working as a clerk for the General Commission of German Trade Unions, although after the November Revolution, he was again able to work full-time for the union.

Etzkorn resigned as president of the union, now called the Union of Hairdressers and Assistants, in 1921, and became the trade union editor of Vorwärts, the SPD newspaper. He remained secretary of the international federation, and in 1928 was made honorary vice president of his old union. In 1932, it merged into the General Union of Public Sector and Transport Workers, and Etzkorn became an honorary president of its municipal section.

In 1933, the Nazi government banned trade unions, and Etzkorn lost his job. He was unemployed until 1938, when he finally found work as a registrar. He survived World War II, and at the end of the war joined the refounded SPD, dying early in 1946.

Trade union offices
Preceded by Carl Wesche	President of the Union of Hairdressers and Assistants; 1900–1921	Succeeded by Karl Lorenz
Preceded by New position	General Secretary of the International Union of Hairdressers; 1907–1933	Succeeded by H. M. Christensen
