= Danish Lithographers' Union =

Danish trade union

The Danish Lithographers' Union (Danish: Dansk Litografisk Forbund) was a trade union representing printers in Denmark.

The union was founded on 13 July 1895, and was originally called the Lithographers' Trade Association. Groups in Aarhus, Copenhagen and Odense helped create the union. It was registered at the start of 1896, and by the end of the year, also had branches in Horten and Aalborg. That year, it also launched a union journal, and began negotiations which led to an agreed minimum wage and agreed conditions of employment.

The union joined the Lithographers' International in 1897, and the Danish Confederation of Trade Unions in 1898. In 1903, the union established a section for process workers, followed in 1910 by one for stone and plate preparers.

In 1962, the union formed the Graphic Workers' Cartel with the Danish Bookbinders' and Stationers' Union, and the Danish Typographical Union. However, this loose federation made no progress, and in 1965, the typographers resigned from the LO and the cartel. They rejoined LO in 1971, forming a new Graphics Cartel in 1972, but again this ran into disputes, and was dissolved in 1980. Finally, in 1990, the bookbinders, lithographers, typographers and the Media Federation formed a Graphic Industry and Media Cartel. In 1993, the four unions merged, to form the new Graphics Federation.
