= Union of Hairdressers and Assistants =

- Arbeitnehmerverband des Friseur- und Haargewerbes
- Successor: General Union of Public Sector and Transport Workers
- Founded: 1889
- Dissolved: 1931
- Location: Germany
- Publication: Der Kundschafter
- Affiliations: ADGB

The Union of Hairdressers and Assistants (German: Arbeitnehmerverband des Friseur- und Haargewerbes) was a trade union representing workers in the hairdressing industry in Germany.

== History ==
The union was founded in 1889, as the Union of German Barbers, Hairdressers and Wig Makers, largely on the initiative of Paul Heidmann, who became the first editor of its journal, Der Kundschafter, and later served as its leader.

It struggled through the late 1890s, but after Friedrich Etzkorn became its president, in 1900, it grew rapidly. becoming the Union of Hairdressing Assistants of Germany in 1903. It was also central to forming the International Union of Hairdressers in 1907, with Etkorn becoming its leader, too.

== Members ==
The union was a founding affiliate of the General German Trade Union Confederation in 1919, and that year renamed itself as the "Union of Hairdressers and Assistants". In 1920, membership reached 12,000, but Etzkorn resigned the following year, and the union declined rapidly, membership falling to only 3,788 by 1925.

== Merger ==
At the start of 1932, the union merged into the General Union of Public Sector and Transport Workers, the merger being approved by 95% of the members of the hairdressing union.

== Presidents ==
- 1889: Heinrich Dierksen
- 1891: Hermann Mertzig
- 1893: Paul Heidmann
- 1896: Carl Wesche
- 1900: Friedrich Etzkorn
- 1921: Karl Lorenz

== See also ==
- International Union of Hairdressers
