= Arbeiterverband für Südwestafrika =

Trade union centre of South West Africa

Arbeiterverband für Südwestafrika ('Workers League for South West Africa') was a trade union centre in South West Africa. It was an affiliate of the International Federation of Trade Unions 1929–1939. The affiliation to IFTU had been approved in principle, on the condition that Arbeiterverband remove its policy of blocking Africans from becoming members. The Arbeiterverband did however retain its policy of not allowing Africans to become members, arguing that the native workforce was not unionized at all. The IFTU then ignored its conditions of Arbeiterverband and the organization was recognized as an IFTU affiliate.
