= Danish Painters' Union =

Danish trade union

The Danish Painters' Union (Danish: Malerforbundet i Danmark, Maler) is a trade union representing sign makers, painters and decorators in Denmark.

The union was founded in 1890, and joined the Danish Confederation of Trade Unions (LO) in 1899. By 1997, it had 14,089 members, but by 2018, this had declined to only 6,677. Since 2019, it has been affiliated to LO's successor, the Danish Trade Union Confederation.
