= Danish General Workers' Union =

Danish trade union

The Danish General Workers' Union (Danish: Specialarbejderforbundet i Danmark, SID) was a general union representing mostly unskilled and semi-skilled workers, in Denmark.

== History ==
The union was founded in 1897 as the Danish Workers' Union (DA), becoming the Danish Workers' and Specialist Workers' Union (DASF) in 1959, then in 1974 adopted its final name. It organised workers who were considered unskilled, or semi-skilled, in industries where the most skilled workers were represented by other unions. This sometimes led to conflict, as it argued that the lowest-paid workers should receive the highest wage increases, to reduce pay differentials.

Over the years, numerous smaller unions have merged in to the Metalworkers' union. These include:

- 1934: Danish Land Workers' Union
- 1971: Danish Glass Workers' Union
- 1972: Danish Gardeners' Union
- 1973: Danish Paviours' Union
- 1978: Danish Drivers' Union
- 1983: Paper Industry Workers' Union
- 1988: Ceramic Confederation
- 1994: Danish Union of Bricklayers
- 1994: Danish Seamen's Union
- 1998: Danish Clothing and Textile Workers' Union
- 2000: Graphics Federation (stationery section)
- 2001: Danish Postal Union
- 2001: Brewery Workers' Union

The union affiliated to the Danish Confederation of Trade Unions (LO) on formation, but left in 1925, rejoining in 1937. From its formation until 1990, the SID was the largest union in Denmark, but it was then surpassed by the Danish Union of Commercial and Clerical Employees. By 1997, it had 319,680 members, of whom about 37% worked in production, 31% in construction, 24% in transport, and the remainder in various other sectors.

At the end of 2004, the union merged with the Danish Women Workers' Union, to form the United Federation of Danish Workers.

== Presidents ==
1897: Michael Christian Lyngsie
1931: Axel Olsen
1947: Christian Larsen
1957: Alfred Petersen
1964: Viggo Wivel
1968: Anker Jørgensen
1972: Ejler Sønder
1979: Hardy Hansen
1995: Poul Erik Skov Christensen
