= Danish Carpenters' Union =

Danish trade union

The Danish Carpenters' Union (Danish: Dansk Tømrerforbund, DT) was a trade union representing carpenters in Denmark.

The union was founded in 1890 and initially consisted of six branches, with a total of about 1,000 members. It grew rapidly and by 1896, had 60 branches and 3,208 members. It soon secured improved pay and conditions and continued to grow. It also affiliated to the Danish Confederation of Trade Unions (LO).

By 1969, the union had 19,737 members. The following year, it merged with the Danish Union of Joiners, to form the Danish Union of Joiners and Carpenters.

== Presidents ==
1937: Ingvard Dahl
1950s: Christoffer Nielsen
c.1960: Henry Hansen
