= International Union of Hairdressers =

Defunct trade union federation

The International Union of Hairdressers was a global union federation bringing together trade unions representing hairdressers.

In the late 19th-century and early 20th-century, many German hairdressers found work in other European countries, and this led the German Union of Hairdressers and Assistants to build links with unions in those other nations. In 1907, it organised a conference in Stuttgart, at which the International Union of Hairdressers was founded.

== Overview ==
The headquarters of the international trade secretariat were initially in Hamburg, but moved to Berlin in 1908. It ceased to function during World War I, but was re-established in 1921 by its former leadership. One of the smaller secretariats, in 1925, it had nine affiliates with a total of only 8,860 members. In 1933, its headquarters moved to Copenhagen, and by 1935 it had affiliates in Czechoslovakia, Denmark, France, Hungary, the Netherlands, Norway, and Sweden.

The federation again became moribund during World War II, and after the war, unions of hairdressers instead joined the International Federation of Commercial, Clerical and Technical Employees.

== Affiliates ==
The following unions were affiliated in 1922:

Union	Country	Members
Union of Hairdressers' Assistants of Austria	Austria	1,448
	Czechoslovakia	800
Barbers' and Hairdressers' Association of Denmark	Denmark	964
	Finland	150
Union of Hairdressers and Assistants	Germany	?
	Hungary	973
	Latvia	68
Norwegian Barbers' and Hairdressers' Union	Norway	200
Swedish Hairdressers' Union	Sweden	327
Swiss Hairdressers' Union	Switzerland	250

== Presidents ==
1907: Friedrich Etzkorn
1933: H. M. Christensen

== See also ==
- Swedish Hairdressers' Union
