= Danish Trade Union Confederation =

National trade union center in Denmark

- Fagbevægelsens Hovedorganisation
- Predecessor: Danish Confederation of Trade Unions, Confederation of Professionals in Denmark
- Founded: 1 January 2019
- Headquarters: Islands Brygge 32D, 2300 Copenhagen
- Location: Denmark
- Members: 1,400,000
- Key people: Morten Skov Christiansen ( Acting Chairman )
- Affiliations: ITUC, ETUC, TUAC, NFS
- Website: fho.dk

The Danish Trade Union Confederation (Danish: Fagbevægelsens Hovedorganisation, FH) is the largest national trade union centre in Denmark. On formation in 2019, it had 79 affiliated unions, with a total of 1.4 million members out of a population of roughly six million.

== History ==
The confederation was founded on 1 January 2019, when the Danish Confederation of Trade Unions (LO) merged with the Confederation of Professionals in Denmark (FTF). LO consisted of 18 unions, with a total of one million members, most of whom worked in the private sector, while FTF consisted of 70 professional organisations, with a total of just under 500,000 members, most of whom worked in the public sector.

LO and FTF began discussing a possible merger in 2015. Some affiliates were dubious about the proposition. The FTF's Finance Federation opposed the merger, while LO's largest affiliate, the United Federation of Danish Workers (3F), only decided to support it early in March 2018. One week after 3F's decision, the FTF and LO voted on the proposal. 389 out of 400 delegates to the LO conference approved the merger, and 71.4% of voters in the FTF approved. The new federation's name and leadership were agreed in October 2018.

Denmark's other trade union centre, the Danish Confederation of Professional Associations (AC), decided against joining the new federation, arguing that its members' interests differed from those of the members of the LO and FTF.

== Policy ==
The new organisation decided to maintain the "Danish model", whereby pay and working conditions are negotiated without state involvement. It also argued in support of the Danish welfare state.

The federation remained affiliated to the European Trade Union Confederation (ETUC), and argued that, as a larger organisation, it would be more influential within the ETUC. The federation also affiliated to Joint Committee of the Nordic Social Democratic Labour Movement, but described itself as independent of any political party.

The federation organises May Day demonstrations. For its first May Day, in 2019, the theme of the demonstrations was "unity".

== Organisation ==
The federation is led by president Lizette Risgaard, former president of LO, and six vice presidents.

The unions affiliated to FH have a high degree of independence, leaving the headquarters relatively small and with limited funds. FH was established with 25% fewer staff than its combined predecessors, and aimed to save 30% of administration costs.

== Affiliates ==
Union	Abbreviation	Membership
Army Privates' and Corporals' Association	HKKF	4,101
Association of Court Employees		46
Association of Danish Cemetery Managers	FDK	135
Association of Danish Chairpersons		Not recorded
Association of Danish Inseminators		173
Association of Map and Surveying Technicians	KLF	664
Association of Musicians in the Armed Forces	DMF	70
Association of Parliamentary Servants		87
Association of Social Educators	SL	35,648
Association of Technical and Administrative Officials	TAT	536
Association of the Danish Radio Symphony Orchestra		100
Aviation and Railway Trade Federation		Not recorded
BUPL	BUPL	55,480
Cabin Union Denmark		1,193
Central Association of Armed Forces Personnel	CS	8,286
CO10 Musicians' Group		Not recorded
Danish Actors' Association	DSF	1,964
Danish Association of Pharmaconomists	FF	4,541
Danish Association of Social Workers	DS	13,913
Danish Artist Union	DAF	1,150
Danish Bioanalysts		Not recorded
Danish Chamber Orchestra Union		47
Danish Choir Association		62
Danish Choral Association		570
Danish Church Music Association		271
Danish Customs and Tax Association	DTS	2,592
Danish Dental Hygienists		1,828
Danish EL-Federation	DEF	22,808
Danish Elite Athletes' Association	DEF-Sport	Not recorded
Danish Football Players' Association	SPF	667
Danish Forest and Landscape Engineers' Association		Not recorded
Danish Handball Players' Association		553
Danish Musicians' Union	DMF	4,883
Danish Nurses' Organization	DSR	62,770
Danish Orthopaedic Engineers' Association		41
Danish Painters' Union	Maler	6,677
Danish Podiatrists		1,632
Danish Police Federation		11,815
Danish Psychomotor Therapists	DAP	948
Danish Radio Media Association	MDR	228
Danish Sexton's Association		570
Danish Tin and Plumbing Workers' Union	Blik og Rør	8,475
Danish Union of Metalworkers	Metal	72,399
Danish Union of Professional Technicians	TL	22,874
Danish Union of Teachers	DLF	58,179
Diet and Nutrition Association	KOST	8,230
DSL	DSL	593
Education Association		9,187
FAF	FAF	922
FOA	FOA	153,985
Food Union NNF	NNF	17,095
Frederiksberg Municipal Association	FKF	441
Free Schools' Teachers' Association	FSL	10,000
Gentofte Municipal Association	GKF	392
Greenland Organisation for Public Employees	AK	Not recorded
HI	HI	432
HK Denmark	HK	179,262
Insurance Association		7,839
JID	JID	1,208
Kirkekultur.nu		Not recorded
KL Staff Association		118
National Orchestra Musicians' Joint Council		325
Organists' Association		581
Prisons Association	FFT	227
Prison Federation	KFF	2,807
PROSA	PROSA	10,720
Public Emergency Preparedness Association	DOBL	321
Radiographers' Council	Radiograf	2,042
Radio Telegraphists' Association of 1917		Not recorded
SAFU	SAFU	914
Services Union		15,121
Traffic League	TRF	610
Tourist Guides' Association		251
United Federation of Danish Workers	3F	226,271
Viften		95
