= Danish Union of Slaughterhouse Workers =

Danish trade union

The Danish Union of Slaughterhouse Workers (Danish: Dansk Slagteriarbejderforbund, DSA) was a trade union representing workers in the meat industry in Denmark.

The union was founded in 1895, and soon affiliated to the Danish Confederation of Trade Unions. By 1979, it had 22,902 members. The following year, it merger with the Danish Tobacco Workers' Union, the Bakery, Pastry and Mill Workers' Union, and the Confectionery and Chocolate Workers' Union, to form the Danish Food and Allied Workers' Union.
