= Danish Medical Association =

DADL/DMA
- Danish Medical Association
- Den Almindelige Danske Lægeforening
- Headquarters: Copenhagen, Denmark
- Location: Denmark
- Members: 26,235
- Key people: Mads Henrik Koch Hansen, Chairman; Jens Winther Jensen, President; Jette Hansen Dam; Michael Dupont; Carl Johan F. Erichsen; Bruno A.Melgaard Jensen; Anja Ulrike Mitchell; Lise Møller; Camilla Noelle Rathcke; Andreas Rudkjøbing; Mads Skippe
- Affiliations: AC
- Website: www.laeger.dk

The Danish Medical Association (DADL) is a medical professional association in Denmark. It has a membership of 21,800, and is affiliated with the Danish Confederation of Professional Associations. Since 1954, it has published the medical journal Danish Medical Journal, which was originally named Danish Medical Bulletin until 2012.

== History ==
The Danish Medical Association began in town of Korsør on the island of Zealand, on September 1, 1857, after many informal meetings over the prior 6 years attended by many "provincial doctors" from around the nation. According to an article published in the British Medical Journal in 1957, "The D.M.A.'s present objects, as revised in 1935, are (1) to unite Danish doctors in watching over the interests of the profession, and (2) to act as the organ by which the medical profession exerts its influence on problems affecting the community in general."

== List of other organizations ==
Danish Medical Association is the main organization which has a number of physician associations / trade unions under its umbrella:

- Association of Junior Doctors
- General Practitioners Organization
- Association of Medical Specialists
