= Danish Union of Librarians =

Danish trade union

BF
- Danish Union of Librarians
- Bibliotekarforbundet

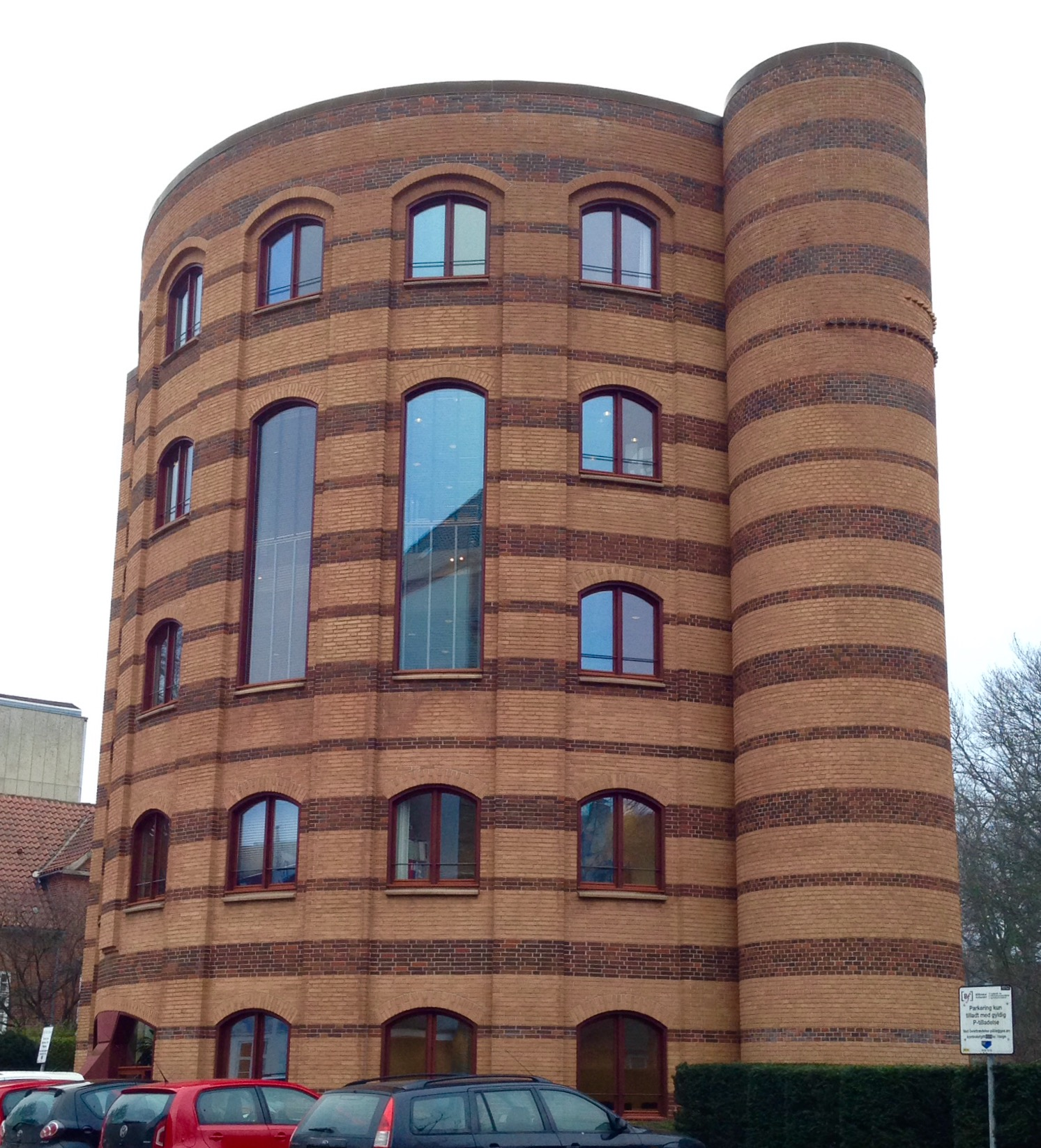
- Headquarters building
- Type: Trade union
- Headquarters: Frederiksberg, Denmark
- Location: Denmark
- Members: 5500
- Key people: Pernille Drost, president
- Affiliations: AC
- Website: www.bf.dk/dk

The Danish Union of Librarians (BF) is a trade union in Denmark. It has a membership of 5500, and is affiliated with the Danish Confederation of Professional Associations.
