= Danish Woodworkers' Union =

Denmark trade union

The Danish Woodworkers' Union (Danish: Træindustriforbundet i Danmark, TAF) was a trade union representing workers in wood manufacturing and construction in Denmark.

The union was founded in 1895, as the Sawmill and Machine Workers' Federation of Denmark. It later affiliated to the Danish Confederation of Trade Unions.

Several smaller union merged into TAF:

- 1950: Basket Makers' Union
- 1954: Turners' Union
- 1954: Corkscrew and Sortererskernes' Union
- 1970: Picture Framers' Union

By 1996, the union had 23,710 members. At the start of 1997, it merged with the Danish Union of Joiners and Carpenters, to form the Danish Timber Industry and Construction Workers' Union.
