= United Federation of Danish Workers =

Trade union in Denmark

3F
- United Federation of Workers in Denmark
- Fagligt Fælles Forbund
- Founded: 2004
- Headquarters: Copenhagen, Denmark
- Location: Denmark
- Members: 374,000 (2005); 269,763 (2020)
- Key people: Per Christensen (President)
- Affiliations: FH
- Website: www.3f.dk

The United Federation of Workers in Denmark (Danish: Fagligt Fælles Forbund, 3F) is a Danish labor union.

The union was formed in 2004, from the merger of the Danish Women Workers' Union and the Danish General Workers' Union. In 2006, the Restaurant Trade Union merged in to 3F, while, at the start of 2011, it was joined by the Danish Timber Industry and Construction Workers' Union.

The 3F was an affiliate of the Danish Confederation of Trade Unions, and since 2019 has been a member of its successor, the Danish Trade Union Confederation (FH). By the end of 2018, its membership had declined to 226,271, but it remained the largest affiliate of FH.

== Presidents ==
2005: Poul Christensen
2013: Per Christensen
2022: Henning Overgaard
