= Danish Brewery, Distillery and Mineral Water Workers' Union =

Danish trade union

Logo of the union

The Danish Brewery, Distillery and Mineral Water Workers' Union (Danish: Dansk Bryggeri-, Brænderi og Mineralvandsarbejder Forbund, DBBMF) was a trade union representing workers in the beverage industry in Denmark.

The union was founded in 1898, as the Danish Brewery Workers' Union. It affiliated to the Danish Confederation of Trade Unions (LO), and later, to the International Union of Food and Allied Workers (IUF). By 1954, it had 8,390 members. From 1926 until 1962, it was led by Marius Madsen, who became president of the IUF.

In 1990, the union merged with the Danish Hotel and Restaurant Workers' Union and the National Gastronomic Union, to form the Restaurant and Brewery Workers' Union.

== Presidents ==
1898: Carl Hansen
1909: Ole Sørensen
1911: Johan Eckel
1915: Fr. Poulsen
1926: Marius Madsen
1963: Ivar Kirk Nielsen
1981: Aage Jensen?
