= Danish Typographical Union =

Danish trade union

The Danish Typographical Union (Danish: Dansk Typograf-Forbund) was a trade union representing typographers in Denmark.

The Typographical Association was founded in 1869, focusing its attention on discussions on the development of the trade, and establishing a library for members, in Copenhagen. In 1874, it launched a magazine, the Typograf-Tidende. Frederik Klüglein argued that the union should also take up questions of pay and working conditions, but the union's leader, R. P. Jensen, was initially uninterested. In 1876, Jensen did lead a strike for improved pay but, without links to other labour movement organisations, the union was unable to sustain the action. The strike was lost, members of the union fell below 100, and Jensen resigned.

In 1880, the Jutland Typographical Association was established, soon expanding to become the Danish Typographical Association, covering all the country except Copenhagen. It jointly adopted the Copenhagen union's magazine, but in 1885, a group of members defected to the Copenhagen union, which renamed itself as the "New Typographical Association", and the two unions broke off relations.

Despite the split, the two unions gradually re-engaged, and in January 1903, they merged to form the "Danish Typographical Union". The new union joined the Danish Confederation of Trade Unions (LO). It won improved working conditions and shorter working hours, and by 1940, it had grown to 4,500 members. By 1992, it had 8,345 members.

In 1962, the union formed the Graphic Workers' Cartel with the Danish Bookbinders' and Stationers' Union, and the Danish Lithographers' Union. However, this loose federation made no progress, and in 1965, the typographers resigned from the LO and the cartel. It rejoined LO in 1971, forming a new Graphics Cartel in 1972, but again this ran into disputes, and was dissolved in 1980. Finally, in 1990, the bookbinders, lithographers, typographers and the Media Federation formed a Graphic Industry and Media Cartel. In 1993, the four unions merged, to form the new Graphics Federation.
