= Danish Timber, Industry, and Construction Workers' Union =

Danish trade union

TIB
- Danish Timber, Industry, and Construction Workers' Union
- Forbundet Træ-Industri-Byg i Danmark
- Merged into: 3F
- Founded: 1997
- Dissolved: 31 December 2010
- Headquarters: Copenhagen, Denmark
- Location: Denmark
- Members: 68,000
- Key people: Arne Johansen, president
- Affiliations: LO Denmark
- Website: www.tib.dk

The Danish Timber, Industry, and Construction Workers' Union (TIB) was a trade union representing construction, wood and furniture workers in Denmark.

The union was founded in 1997, when the Danish Union of Joiners and Carpenters merged with the Danish Woodworkers' Union. On formation, it had 71,572 members, around one-third of whom worked in construction, with the remainder in the wood, furniture and related industries. Like its predecessors, it affiliated to the Danish Confederation of Trade Unions.

On 1 January 2011, the union merged into the United Federation of Danish Workers.

== Presidents ==
1997: Arne Johansen
2008: Johnny Skovengaard
