= FOA (trade union) =

Public sector trade union in Denmark

- Founded: December 1992
- Headquarters: Copenhagen, Denmark
- Location: Denmark
- Members: 153,985 (2018)
- Key people: Mona Striib (President)
- Affiliations: FH
- Website: www.foa.dk

The FOA (from Danish: Forbundet af Offenligt Ansatte) is a trade union representing public sector workers in Denmark.

== History ==
The union was established in December 1992, when the Danish Municipal Workers' Union merged with the Homeworkers' Union, forming the Union of Public Employees (FOA). Changes in the health and social care sectors in Denmark had led to the two unions competing for the same members, and the merger intended to remove this competition. Initially, it had four sectors: social and health care, cooking and cleaning, technology and service, and education.

Like its predecessors, the FOA affiliated to the Danish Confederation of Trade Unions (LO), becoming its third largest member. Since 2019, it has been a member of the LO's successor, the Danish Confederation of Trade Unions (FH).

In January 2005, the Danish Union of Educators also merged into the FOA. As of 2018, the union had 153,985 members. The majority work for local and regional governments, in roles including nursing, firefighting, cooking, cleaning, building maintenance, and bus driving, although a minority work in similar roles in the private sector.

== Leadership ==
=== Presidents ===
1992: Poul Winckler
2005: Dennis Kristensen
2018: Mona Striib

=== Vice-Presidents ===
1992: Margit Vognsen
2004: Mona Striib
2018: Thomas Enghausen
