= Danish Prison Federation =

Danish trade union

The Danish Prison Federation (Danish: Fængselsforbundet i Danmark) is a trade union representing workers in the Prison and Probation Service in Denmark, Greenland and the Faeroe Islands.

The union was founded in December 1913 with the merger of local unions representing prison staff in Vridsløselille, Horsens and Nyborg. By 1954, the union was affiliated to the Danish Confederation of Trade Unions (LO), and had 1,740 members. From 1942 to 1963, it was led by A. C. Petersen, who for the first time brought probation staff into the union.

As of 2018, the union had 2,807 members. Since 2019, it has been affiliated to LO's successor, the Danish Trade Union Confederation.
