= Central Association of Armed Forces Personnel =

Trade union for the Danish Armed Forces

The Central Association of Armed Forces Personnel (Danish: Centralforeningen for stampersonel, CS) is a trade union representing sergeants, civilian personnel, and some junior ranks, in the Danish Armed Forces.

The union was founded in 1967, and in about 1978, it affiliated to the Confederation of Professionals in Denmark (FTF). The Army Privates' and Corporals' Association was affiliated to the union, but in 1984 it split away.

Several small unions have merged into CS, including the Rescue Preparedness Association, the Defence Civil Service Association, and the Navy Seamen's Association. By 2018, it had 8,286 members. Since 2019, it has been affiliated to the FTF's successor, the Danish Trade Union Confederation.
