= International Federation of Trade Unions =

International organization of trade unions (1919–1945)

IFTU
- International Federation of Trade Unions
- Amsterdam International
- Predecessor: International Secretariat of National Trade Union Centres
- Merged into: World Federation of Trade Unions
- Founded: July 1919; 107 years ago
- Dissolved: 1945; 81 years ago
- Headquarters: Several Cities
- Location: International
- Key people: W. A. Appleton, Walter Citrine

The International Federation of Trade Unions (IFTU; also known as the Amsterdam International) was an international organization of trade unions, existing between 1919 and 1945. IFTU had its roots in the pre-war IFTU.

IFTU had close links to the Labour and Socialist International. The IFTU was opposed by the Communist-controlled trade unions. After the American AFL dropped out in 1925 the IFTU became a mainly European body with social democratic orientation. Its primary activity was to lobby the League of Nations and national governments on behalf of the International Labour Organization (ILO).

There were various International Trade Secretariats. The major ITS was the International Transportworkers Federation.

As of 1930 it had affiliates in 29 countries and a combined membership of 13.5 million. Its headquarters was in Amsterdam 1919–1930, in Berlin 1931–1933, in Paris 1933–1940 and in London 1940–1945. Walter Schevenels was the secretary-general of the IFTU 1930–1945. The IFTU dissolved in 1945 to be replaced by the World Federation of Trade Unions (WFTU).

== Founding ==
The European trade union movement had been divided by the First World War. An international meeting of trade unions was held in Bern, Switzerland, February 5-February 9, 1919, after the First World War.

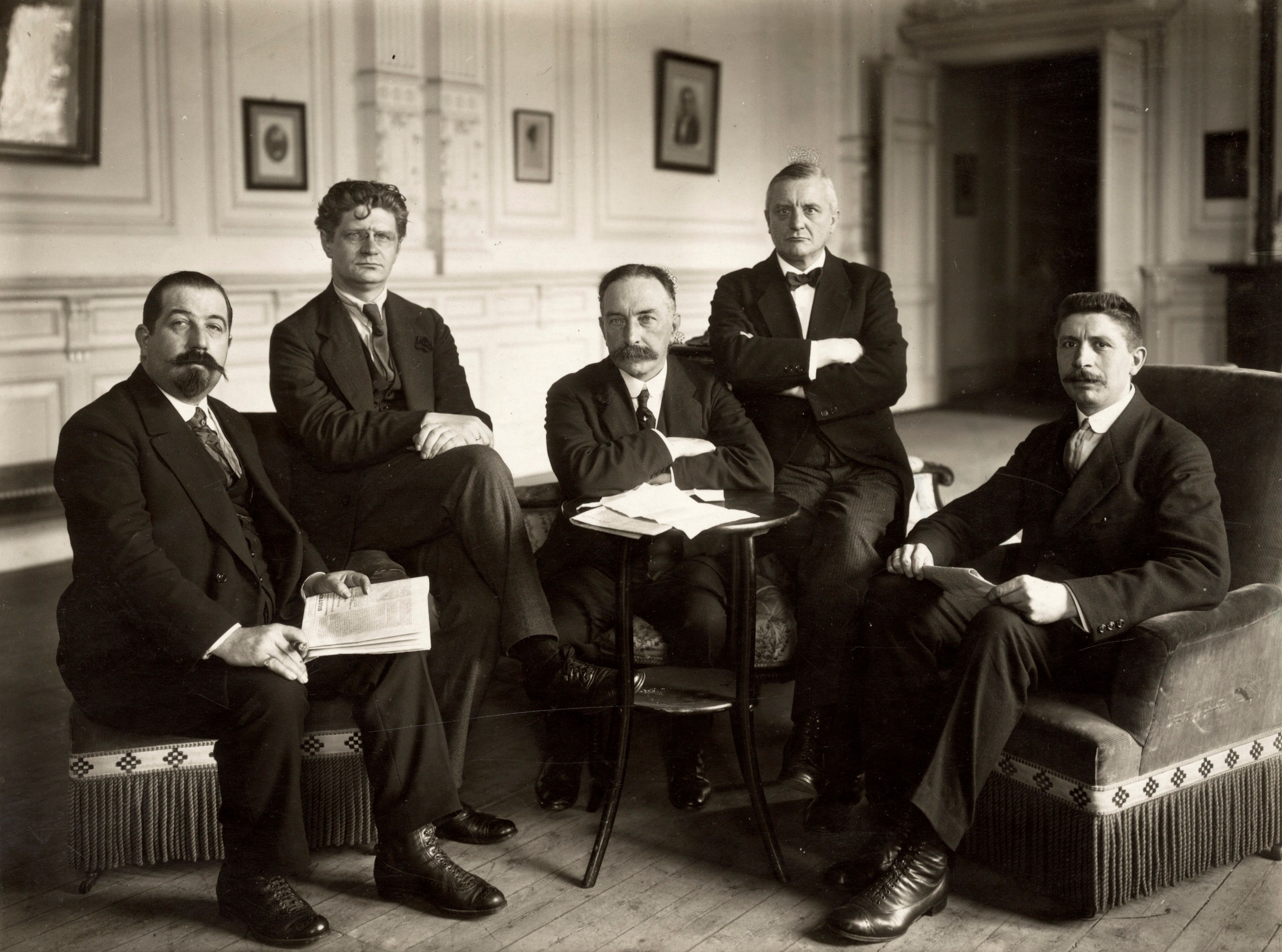
Jouhaux, Fimmen, Appleton, Oudegeest and Mertens at the IFTU congress in Amsterdam (1919)

The constituent congress of IFTU was held in the Amsterdam Concertgebouw in July 1919. Union representatives from 14 countries took part (United States, Belgium, Denmark, Germany, France, Great Britain, Holland, Luxemburg, Norway, Austria, Sweden, Switzerland, Spain, Czechoslovakia), representing a combined membership of 17.7 million.

All delegations at the 1919 congress were Europeans, except the American Federation of Labor. However, the AFL delegate Samuel Gompers participated with a mandate from the Pan-American Federation of Labor. The only major industrial country absent was Italy, whose delegates encountered passport problems.

In the refounded IFTU the general principle was that only one national centre per country would be admitted. However, at the founding congress there were exceptions. The British delegation consisted of both TUC and GFTU representatives. From Germany and the Netherlands both Social Democratic (GGWD and NVV) and Syndicalist (VDGW and NAS) trade unions participated.

At the congress there were two candidates for the presidency of IFTU. The Briton W. A. Appleton was elected with 31 votes against 18 for the Dutchman Jan Oudegeest. Appleton had been nominated by Samuel Gompers whilst Oudegeest had been nominated by Arvid Thorberg. Two vice-presidents were also elected. In the election for the first vice-president the German Carl Legien was defeated by the Frenchman Léon Jouhaux. The defeat of the German candidate could be seen as an indication that many trade unionists in the former Allied countries were suspicious of the Germans, who had dominated the international labour movement before the war. Following Legien's defeat, the German and Austrian delegations abstained from nominating candidates for the second vice-president. The Belgian Cornel Mertens was elected to the position. Jan Oudegeest and fellow Dutchman Edo Fimmen were elected general secretaries.

== Political contradictions ==
The new international was politically Social Democratic. In the pre-war IFTU there had been both socialist and non-political union centres, but at the Amsterdam congress Oudegeest pronounced that the refounded IFTU would have a socialist orientation. The socialist profile was important, as in most countries in Europe the IFTU faced communist opposition at the time. The Amsterdam congress adopted a resolution advocating the socialization of the means of production, a resolution opposed by the Gompers. In the end, the Gompers decided that the AFL would not affiliate itself with the IFTU.

IFTU was an almost exclusively European organization. Four non-European countries were had IFTU affiliates; Canada, Argentina, Peru and Palestine (Histadrut). Histadrut joined IFTU in 1923. But these affiliations were largely dormant. Prior to 1937 the American affiliates played no role in the organization, and had no representation in the IFTU membership. Notably, the British TUC was reluctant to expanding the IFTU activities to India and other British colonies.

The socialist orientation of IFTU was complicated by the fact that the president, Appleton, came from the non-political camp and had been an ally of Gompers. Moreover, IFTU demanded that the British TUC and GFTU had to merge into a single organization. The result was that TUC decided that it would be the sole British representative in the IFTU. Thus the GFTU leader Appleton resigned as IFTU president. He was replaced by J. H. Thomas.

== London and Rome congresses ==
In 1920 an extraordinary IFTU congress was held in London.

In 1922 the second IFTU conference was held in Rome. At the Rome conference several new members were affiliated to the IFTU, from Greece, Bulgaria, Czechoslovakia, Yugoslavia, Hungary and Latvia. Through this expansion, the IFTU membership reached its peak of 24 million. However, the Norwegian LO withdrew from IFTU in protest to the policy of IFTU towards the Soviet Union. Soon after the Rome conference, the fascist regime in Italy would repress the Italian unions.

The Rome congress elected Theodor Leipart as vice-president. It also chose Vienna as the site of the next IFTU congress. Both of these decisions were seen by contemporary analysts as a partial rehabilitation of the Germans inside the IFTU.

== Hague Peace Conference ==
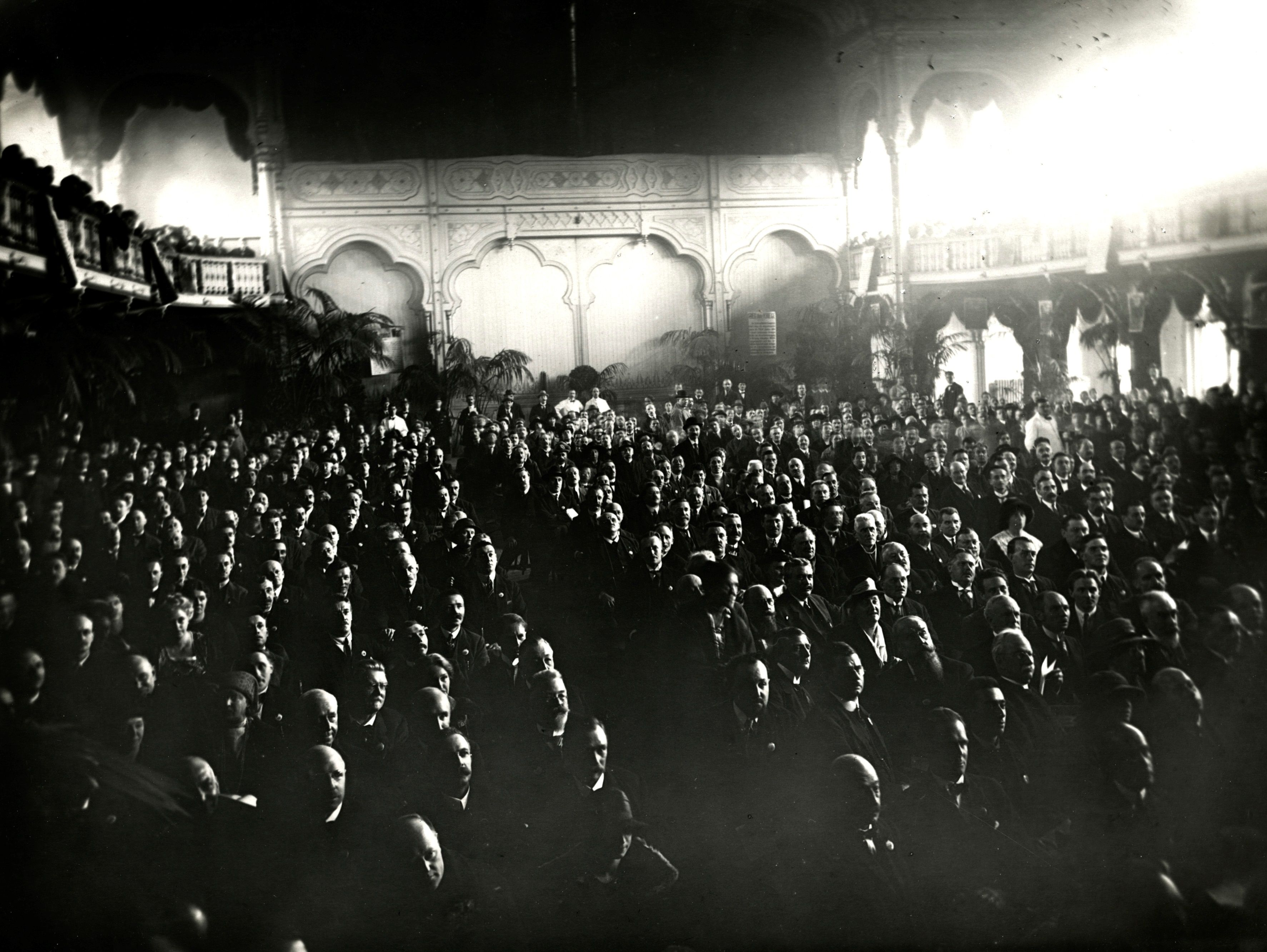
Overview of the participants of the Hague Peace Conference during the opening speech

December 10-December 15, 1922 the IFTU organized an internal Peace Conference in The Hague. The conference took place in the backdrop of mounting military tension over the Ruhr. The Peace Conference marked the height of influence of IFTU. The initiative to hold the conference had come from Edo Fimmen, who represented a radical and anti-militarist position. 700 delegates assisted the conference. Unlike other IFTU events, a delegation from the Soviet Union (that included Karl Radek and Solomon Lozovsky) was invited. In his inaugural speech, Fimmen, stated that any new world war would be confronted by a global general strike.

However, when French troops occupied the Ruhr a month later, the promised general strike did not occur. The German ADGB opposed initiating a general strike. The IFTU did not go beyond a general call for peace and arbitration through the League of Nations. Fimmen became increasingly disillusioned over these developments. In November 1923 he resigned as ITUF general secretary.

At the Hague Peace Conference Johannes Sassenbach was appointed as the third general secretary of IFTU and John W. Brown as assistant secretary. After a protest from the TUC, Brown was elevated general secretary in August 1923 bringing the number of IFTU general secretaries to four.

== Impact of crisis in Germany ==
By 1923, the influence of IFTU had already passed its peak. As hyperinflation surged in Germany, the economy of IFTU suffered. Moreover, the ADGB lost 1.5 million members, whilst the British TUC 2.3 million. The French CGT lost 750 000 members as the communists split and formed a parallel Confédération générale du travail unitaire (CGTU). The Greek, Peruvian and Argentine union centres had pulled out of IFTU. The economic situation in IFTU was grave, and the secretariat had to downsize. The federation survived due to the financial contributions of the TUC.

The congress of IFTU was held in Vienna from 2 to 6 June 1924. By the time of the congress, the situation in Europe had stabilized somewhat. The Vienna congress elected A. A. Purcell of the TUC as the new IFTU president.

In 1926 IFTU went into financial crisis. Nine of the national affiliates had not followed through with their financial commitments to IFTU. The offices in Amsterdam were mortgaged. The IFTU printing office in Germany had to be sold. The TUC decided to freeze their contributions to IFTU, demanding an audit of the IFTU expenses.

== Paris congress ==
In 1927 the IFTU congress was held in Paris. At the congress, TUC confronted the continental unions. TUC demanded that the headquarters be shifted away from Amsterdam, that Purcell's mandate be renewed, and that fellow Briton Brown should be elected as the sole general secretary. In his speech to the congress, Purcell called for the inclusion of the Soviet union movement into the IFTU. The proposal was rejected by the leaders of continental unions.

The congress continued with mutual accusations of intriguing between the TUC and the continental Europeans. Brown and Oudegeest decided to resign from their positions. Purcell was re-elected as president, but by only one vote. Johannes Sassenbach was re-elected general secretary. Two vice-presidents was elected, Carl Madsen from Denmark and Rudolf Tayerlé from Czechoslovakia.

The TUC and IFTU reconciled later in 1927, as the TUC broke its links to the Soviet trade unions. However, the continental unions had zero confidence in Purcell. In the end, Purcell resigned on his own. He was replaced by the TUC general secretary Walter Citrine in 1928.

By 1927 IFTU had around 13.5 million members. The decline in membership was mainly due to membership losses in the German union movement. However, the IFTU had attracted some new affiliates; in Lithuania, Memel Territory, Argentina (CORA) and South Africa (Industrial and Commercial Workers Union).

In 1928 the Danish vice-president Madsen resigned, and was replaced by fellow Dane Hans Jacobsen.

== Expansion outside Europe ==
During 1928–1929, the IFTU broadened its contacts to the Middle East, Asia and Australia. Citrine, like his predecessor Purcell, had seen the geographic limitations of IFTU as a major weakness of the organization. In 1928, IFTU organized a meeting in Buenos Aires, which formed the short-lived Confederación Obrera Ibero Americana. Participants at the conference were the Confederación Obrera Argentina and pro-government trade unionists from Venezuela, Uruguay, Cuba and Spain.

In 1928 the Arbeiterverband für Südwestafrika was affiliated to IFTU (initially IFTU had demanded that the Arbeiterverband would scrap its ban on African membership, but later retracted the demand). Confederación Obrera de Argentina rejoined the IFTU, but the contacts were lost again soon afterwards. Persatoean Vabonden Pegawai Negeri from the Dutch East Indies joined IFTU.

In 1934 the Argentine CGT and the National Trades Union Federation from India became a member of IFTU.

== International financial crisis and the rise of fascism ==
As of 1930, the executive board of IFTU consisted of Léon Jouhaux (France), Johannes Sassenbach (Germany) general secretary, Walter Citrine (Britain) president, Walter Schevenels (Belgium), Theodor Leipart (Germany), Rudolf Tayerlé (Czechoslovakia), Corneel Mertens (Belgium) and Hans Jacobsen (Denmark).

Ahead of the 1930 Stockholm congress of IFTU the TUC and ADGB agreed to share the two main positions (presidency and secretariat) between themselves. The secretariat headquarters would, according to the deal, be shifted to Germany. At the congress several delegations from European countries opposed moving the headquarters out of Amsterdam. Fear of the consequences of the rise of National Socialism in Germany was one of the reasons cited in their argumentation against the move. However, in July 1931, the headquarters of IFTU were shifted to Hansahaus, Köpernickestrasse, Berlin.

On February 1, 1931, Sassenbach resigned due to old age. He was replaced by his assistant, the Belgian Walter Schevenels. Jiri (George) Stolz from Czechoslovakia was appointed as Schevenels' assistant.

As a result of the financial crisis and rise of fascism, the bonds between IFTU and the Labour and Socialist International were strengthened. Effectively the political situation radicalized the IFTU. In April 1931, an IFTU General Council meeting held in Madrid decided to shift the IFTU demand for 44-hour working-week to demanding 40-hour working week. Ahead of the 1932 disarmament conference of the League of Nations, the IFTU president Citrine and the LSI president Emile Vandervelde drafted an appeal against war and fascism. The appeal was signed by 14 million people.

The IFTU headquarters had to shift away from Berlin as the NSDAP took power in Germany. Paris was selected as the new venue of the IFTU secretariat, which was set up in the CGT office at Avenue d'Orsay. Soon after this shift, the German trade unions were banned. The disappearance of ADGB created a great void in IFTU. The financial situation of IFTU deteriorated as contributions from the German and Austrian unions ceased.

The 1933 IFTU congress in Brussels discussed how to confront the advances of Nazism. The congress resolved to turn the existing initiatives of boycotts of German goods into a general blockade. That decision was however never implemented. On the whole the IFTU was divided on how to confront Nazism, much to the dismay of the exiled German union leaders.

In 1936 IFTU held a congress in London.

At the outbreak of the Second World War (1939), the headquarters were moved to London. During the war, the IFTU effectively ceased to exist and the British trade union federation TUC maintained the secretariat. In 1945, the ITUC was formally dissolved and the affiliated organisations joined the new World Federation of Trade Unions. Two years later, most of them would form the International Confederation of Free Trade Unions.

== International Trade Secretariats ==
As of 1932, the following trade secretariats were affiliated to the IFTU:

- International Bookbinders' Union
- International Federation of Boot and Shoe Operatives and Leather Workers
- International Federation of Building Workers
- International Clothing Workers' Federation
- International Federation of Commercial, Clerical and Technical Employees
- Universal Alliance of Diamond Workers
- International Federation of Enginemen and Firemen
- International Union of Food and Drink Workers
- International Federation of General Factory Workers
- International Federation of Glassworkers
- International Union of Hairdressers
- International Union of Hatters
- International Union of Hotel, Restaurant and Bar Workers
- International Landworkers' Federation
- International Federation of Lithographers, Lithographic Printers and Kindred Trades
- International Metalworkers' Federation
- International Federation of Miners
- International Secretariat of Painters and Allied Trades
- Postal, Telegraph and Telephone International
- International Federation of Pottery Workers
- International Printers' Secretariat
- International Federation of Employees in Public Services
- International Secretariat of Stone Workers
- Teachers' International Trade Secretariat
- International Federation of Textile Workers' Associations
- International Federation of Tobacco Workers
- International Transport Workers' Federation
- International Federation of Woodworkers

== Publication ==
IFTU published the periodical The International Trade Union Movement.

== See also ==
- List of federations of trade unions
- List of trade unions
- Profintern

== Bibliography ==
Notes

References

- Goethem, Geert van (2006). The Amsterdam International: the world of the International Federation of Trade Unions (IFTU), 1913-1945 (2006 ed.). Ashgate Publishing, Ltd. ISBN 978-0-7546-5254-0. - Total pages: 320
- Guerra, Sergio; Prieto, Alberto (1980). Cronología del movimiento obrero y de las luchas por la revolución socialista en América Latina y el Caribe (1917-1939) (in Spanish) (1980 ed.). Casa de las Américas. - Total pages: 106
