= Margretta Styles =

American nurse, author, educator and nursing school dean

Margretta (Gretta) Madden Styles, EdD, RN, FAAN (March 19, 1930 – November 20, 2005) was an American nurse, author, educator and nursing school dean who conceived and helped establish national standards for certifying nurses in pediatrics, cardiology and other medical specialties. Dr. Styles was the president of the American Nurses Association from 1986 to 1988, and wrote five books and many articles published in medical journals.

== Career ==
Styles was born in Mount Union, Pennsylvania. She graduated from Juniata College in Huntingdon, Pennsylvania with degrees in biology and chemistry, and earned her master's degree in nursing at Yale University, and her doctorate in education from the University of Florida. In 1967, Styles became an associate professor of nursing at Duke University. She later served as dean of nursing at the University of Texas Health Science Center at San Antonio and Wayne State University in Detroit, Michigan. From 1977 through 1987, she was dean of nursing at the University of California, San Francisco.

Styles played a significant role in efforts to develop stricter certification and credentialing systems for nurses. Styles wrote extensively on advanced nursing practices for nursing journals, advocating strict criteria for issuing nursing credentials. She was instrumental in the founding of the American Nurses Credentialing Center (ANCC). The organization is now a major unit of the American Nurses Association and it administers testing for more than twenty specialties, helping to standardize professional expectations of nurses. Styles was elected president of the International Council of Nurses in 1993.

== Recognition ==
Styles continues to be quoted widely in medical publications. The Margretta Madden Styles Credentialing Research Grant, presented by the ANCC, encourages research on the impact of credentialing processes on nurses and the profession, as well as the accumulation of evidenced-based data to support quality patient care. The UCSF School of Nursing presents the Margretta Styles Distinguished Nurse Award. Styles was inducted into the American Nurses Association hall of fame, was the recipient of numerous awards, including the International Council of Nurses' Christiane Reimann Award, regarded as nursing's most prestigious international honor, and was elected as a fellow of the American Academy of Nursing and the National Institute of Medicine.

== Family ==
Styles was married for 47 years to the Reverend Douglas Styles, an Episcopalian priest who died in 2002. The couple raised two sons and a daughter, and had two grandchildren. Their son, Mike Styles, was the founder and race director of the Midnight Sun Run in Fairbanks, Alaska.

== See also ==
- List of Living Legends of the American Academy of Nursing
