= Danish Clothing Workers' Union =

Danish trade union

The Danish Clothing Workers' Union (Danish: Dansk Beklædningsarbejderforbund, DBF) was a trade union representing people in the garment industry in Denmark.

The union was founded in 1895, and it soon joined the Danish Confederation of Trade Unions (LO). At the start of 1959, the Danish Hatters' and Furriers' Union merged into the union. By 1977, the union had only 20,596 members, of whom more than 92% were women. Because of its large number of women members, it was a leading force in the Trade Union Women's Secretariat from its formation in 1949, until its dissolution in 1970. Helyett Simonsen, who led the secretariat, joined the DBF along with the hatters.

In 1978, the DBF merged with the Danish Textile Workers' Union, to form the Danish Clothing and Textile Workers' Union.

== Presidents ==
1897: Villiam P. Arup
1917: Josef Andersson
1950: Herman Schäfer
1972: Anny Bengtsson
