= Danish Shoemakers' Union =

The Danish Shoemakers' Union (Danish: Dansk Skotøjsarbejderforbundet, DSF) was a trade union representing workers in the shoemaking industry in Denmark.

The union was founded in 1885. It later affiliated to the Danish Confederation of Trade Unions (LO), and in 1931 was the federation's only affiliate to vote against accepting wage cuts. This led it to undertake a three-month strike without support from the federation.

By 1954, the union had 6,042 members. In 1983, it merged into the Danish Clothing and Textile Workers' Union.
