= Restaurant Trade Union =

Danish trade union

The Restaurant Trade Union (Danish: RestaurationsBranchens Forbund, RBF) was a trade union representing hospitality and food manufacturing workers in Denmark.

The union was founded in 1990, when the Danish Brewery, Distillery and Mineral Water Workers' Union merged with the Danish Hotel and Restaurant Workers' Union, and the National Gastronomic Union. Initially named the Restaurant and Brewery Workers' Union, like its predecessors, it affiliated to the Danish Confederation of Trade Unions. In 1991, the Servants' Union also merged into the RBF.

By 1997, the union had 30,911 members, but the following year, the Brewery Workers' Union split away, leading the union to adopt its final name. By 2006, the RBF had about 20,000 members, and it merged into the United Federation of Danish Workers.

== Presidents ==
- 1990: Bent Moos
- 1994: Majbritt Bidstrup
- 1996: Preben Rasmussen
