= Swedish Hairdressers' Union =

Trade union in Sweden

The Swedish Hairdressers' Union (Swedish: Frisöranställdas förbund, FAF) was a trade union representing hairdressers in Sweden.

The union was founded in December 1906, on the initiative of the Barbers' and Hairdressers' Assistants' Association of Stockholm. It initially had 225 members, but struggled, and in 1910 was down to just 46. This proved its nadir, and membership then steadily increased, to a peak of 7,207 in 1968. It then fell slightly, and by 1988 stood at 4,102. The following year, it merged into the Swedish Commercial Employees' Union. The union was affiliated to the Swedish Trade Union Confederation.
