= Danish Union of Educators =

Union of Educators in Denmark

The Danish Union of Educators (Danish: Pædagogisk Medhjælper Forbund, PMF) was a trade union representing teaching assistants in Denmark.

The union was founded in 1974, and in 1983 it affiliated to the Danish Trade Union Confederation. By 1997, it had 30,149 members. In January 2005, it merged into the FOA.
