= Danish Union of Professional Technicians =

TL
- Danish Union of Professional Technicians
- Teknisk Landsforbund
- Headquarters: Copenhagen, Denmark
- Location: Denmark
- Members: 32,000
- Key people: Gita Grüning, president
- Affiliations: LO Denmark
- Website: www.tl.dk

The Danish Union of Professional Technicians (Danish: Teknisk Landsforbund, TL) is a trade union in Denmark. It is an affiliate of the Danish Confederation of Trade Unions.

== History ==
The Danish Union of Professional Technicians was founded in 1919. It became a member of LO in 1994.

== Location ==
The Danish Union of Professional Technicians is based in Teknikernes Hus ("The Technicians' House") at Nørre Voldgade 12 in central Copenhagen. The building is the former headquarters of Kastrup Glasværk. It is from 1892 and was designed by the architect Philip Smidth.
