= Finance Federation (Denmark) =

Danish union for employees working in the field of finance

The Finance Federation (Danish: Finansforbundet) is a trade union representing workers in the financial sector in Denmark.

The union was founded at the start of 1992, when the National Association of Danish Bank Employees merged with the Association of Danish Savings Bank Employees. The new union had a membership of about 50,000 workers and, like its predecessors, it was affiliated to the Danish Trade Union Confederation (FTF), becoming its largest affiliate.

By 2018, the union had 39,011 members. Workers in large institutions are organised by the employer, while those at smaller companies are organised on a geographical basis.

The FTF became part of the Danish Trade Union Confederation in 2019, but the Finance Federation voted against joining the new organisation, and so became unaffiliated with any national body.
