= Danish Confederation of Trade Unions =

Former trade union center in Denmark

LO
- LO, The Danish Confederation of Trade Unions
- LO, Landsorganisationen i Danmark
- Merged into: Danish Trade Union Confederation
- Founded: 1898
- Dissolved: 31 December 2018
- Headquarters: Copenhagen, Denmark
- Location: Denmark
- Members: 1.1 million (2016)
- Key people: President Lizette Risgaard
- Affiliations: ITUC, ETUC, TUAC, NFS
- Website: lo.dk in English

LO, The Danish Confederation of Trade Unions (Danish: LO, Landsorganisationen i Danmark or simply LO) was founded in 1898 and was an umbrella organisation (the largest of the three national trade union centers in Denmark) for 18 Danish trade unions. At the end of 2018, it merged into the new Danish Trade Union Confederation.

== History ==
Lizette Risgaard, who became the first ever female President for LO-Denmark in October 2015, had worked her way slowly up the ladder and was for eight years the vice president.

From 2015, LO engaged in negotiations with FTF about a potential merger. This occurred on 1 January 2019, and the LO became part of the new Danish Trade Union Confederation.

== Organisation ==
In 2016, LO had a membership of about 1.1 million workers (450,000 of them being public sector employees and 650,000 of them being private sector employees). It cooperated with the two other Danish trade union centers: the AC – The Danish Confederation of Professional Associations and the FTF – Confederation of Professionals in Denmark.

Members of the 18 trade unions of the LO were typically skilled or unskilled manual labourers, tradesmen and blue-collar workers from the working class. Members may have had a vocational education, but not a college or academic degree. A typical LO-member occupied a lower class position in society and earned an hourly wage.

LO-members were e.g. blue-collar workers, cleaners, bus drivers, plumbers, electricians, nursing assistants, hairdressers, painters, cosmeticians, gardeners, iron workers, dairymen, secretaries, technicians, assistants, etc.

The LO was affiliated with the International Trade Union Confederation (ITUC), the European Trade Union Confederation (ETUC), the Trade Union Advisory Committee to the OECD (TUAC) and the Council of Nordic Trade Unions (NFS).

The LO carried the role of coordinating collective bargaining. It also sought to influence the government and the political parties when it comes to drafting and implementing legislation, especially in relation to labour market policies. It represented the trade union movement's interests on various boards, commissions and committees.

== Affiliates ==
Union	Abbreviation	Formed	Reason not affiliated	Year	Membership (1954)
Army Privates' and Corporals' Association	HKKF	1949	Transferred to FH	2018	N/A
Association of Dairy Workers		1903	Merged into NNF	1983	3,447
Association of Social Educators	SL	1979	Transferred to FH	2018	N/A
Bakery, Pastry and Mill Workers' Union		1892	Merged into NNF	1980	7,446
Brushmakers' Union		1898	Merged into TIF	1971	651
Ceramic Federation		1897	Merged into SID	1988	3,111
Chimney Sweeps' Union		1914	Merged into Blik og Rør	1994	314
Confectionery and Chocolate Workers' Union		1896	Merged into NNF	1980	1,626
Danish Artist Union	DAF	1918	Transferred to FH	2018	200
Danish Boilermakers' Union		1897	Merged into Metal	1972	2,557
Danish Bookbinders' and Stationers' Union		1895	Merged into GF	1993	7,122
Danish Brewery, Distillery and Mineral Water Workers' Union	DBBMF	1898	Merged into RBF	1990	8,390
Danish Carpenters' Union	DT	1890	Merged into ST	1970	12,270
Danish Central Organisation of Telecommunication Employees	COTD	1944	Merged into TKF	1994	11,000
Danish Clothing and Textile Workers' Union	DBTF	1978	Merged into SID	1997	N/A
Danish Clothing Workers' Union	DBAF	1895	Merged into DBTF	1978	20,094
Danish Coopers' Union		1890	Merged into ST		253
Danish Coppersmiths' Union		1902	Merged into Metal	1969	254
Danish Divers' Union		1920			132
Danish Elite Athletes' Association	DEF-Sport	1904	Transferred to FH	2018	?
Danish Flour Millers' Union		1895			1,226
Danish Food and Allied Workers' Union	NNF	1980	Transferred to FH	2018	N/A
Danish Football Players' Association	SPF	1997	Transferred to FH	2018	N/A
Danish Foundry Workers' Union		1897	Merged into Metal	1970	2,680
Danish Hairdressers' and Beauticians' Union	DFKF	1911	Merged into Dff-S	2013	?
Danish Handball Players' Association		2004	Transferred to FH	2018	N/A
Danish Gardeners' Union		1894	Merged into SID	1972	5,012
Danish Glass Workers' Union		1892	Merged into SID	1971	448
Danish General Workers' Union	SID	1897	Merged into 3F	2004	247,917
Danish Hatters' and Furriers' Union		1901	Merged into DBAF	1959	1,307
Danish Hotel and Restaurant Staff Association		1933	Merged into RBF	1990	1,457
Danish Lithographers' Union		1895	Merged into GF	1993	1,469
Danish Locomotive Engineers' Union		1925	Merged into DJF	1986	300
Danish Mechanical Dentistry Workers' Union		1907			107
Danish Metal Grinders' Union		1903	Merged into Metal	1983	1,047
Danish Metal Printers' Union		1911	Merged into Metal	1967	148
Danish Municipal Workers' Union	DKA	1899	Merged into FOA	1992	17,380
Danish Painters' Union	Maler	1890	Transferred to FH	2018	10,522
Danish Paviours' Union		1875	Merged into SID	1973	198
Danish Postal Union	DPF	1908	Merged into SID	2001	8,830
Danish Prison Federation		1913	Transferred to FH	2018	1,740
Danish Quarry and Stoneworkers' Union		1897	Merged into Murer	1971	635
Danish Railway Union	DJF	1899	Transferred to FH	2018	10,553
Danish Rope Makers' Union	DRAF	1897	Merged into DTAF	1973	495
Danish Seamen's Union	SFD	1897	Resigned	1975	4,972
Danish Ship Builders', Riggers' and Sailmakers' Union	DSRS	1971	Merged into Metal	1976	N/A
Danish Ship Builders' Union		1892	Merged into DSRS	1971	1,563
Danish Shoemakers' Union	DSF	1885	Merged into DBTF	1983	6,042
Danish Tanners' Union		1898	Merged into Sadel	1973	789
Danish Textile Workers' Union	DTAF	1885	Merged into DBTF	1978	22,712
Danish Tobacco Workers' Union		1887	Merged into NNF	1980	7,843
Danish Timber Industry and Construction Workers' Union	TIB	1997	Merged into 3F	2010	N/A
Danish Tin and Plumbing Workers' Union	Blik og Rør	1890	Transferred to FH	2018	3,320
Danish Typographical Union	DT-F	1903	Merged into GF	1993	8,878
Danish Union of Bricklayers	Murer	1887	Merged into SID	1994	11,715
Danish Union of Educators	PMF	1983	Merged into FOA	2015	N/A
Danish Union of Electricians	DEF	1904	Transferred to FH	2018	7,700
Danish Union of Joiners	SF	1885	Merged into ST	1970	13,475
Danish Union of Joiners and Carpenters	ST	1970	Merged into TIB	1996	N/A
Danish Union of Metalworkers	Metal	1888	Transferred to FH	2018	59,329
Danish Union of Professional Technicians	TL	1919	Transferred to FH	2018	?
Danish Union of Service Employees	Dff-S	1911	Transferred to FH	2018	6,186
Danish Union of Slaughterhouse Workers	DSA	1895	Merged into NNF	1980	13,020
Danish Vehicle Builders' Union		1895	Merged into Metal	1976	1,489
Danish Women Workers' Union	KAD	1901	Merged into 3F	2004	41,081
Danish Woodworkers' Union	TIF	1895	Merged into TIB	1996	11,963
FOA	FOA	1992	Transferred to FH	2018	N/A
Glaziers' Union of Denmark		1893	Merged into ST	1975	542
Glovemakers' Union of Denmark			Merged into Sadel	1971	331
Gold and Silver Workers' Union of Denmark		1891	Merged into Metal	1984	1,899
Graphics Federation	GF	1993	Merged into HK	2000	N/A
Homeworkers' Union	HA	1904	Merged into FOA	1992	4,098
Lighthouse Service Union					255
Marine Firemen's Union of Denmark		1897	Merged into Metal	1980	1,750
Metal Workers' Union of Denmark		1903	Merged into Metal	1968	553
National Gastronomic Association		1972	Merged into RBF	1990	N/A
Paper Industry Workers' Union		1895	Merged into SID	1983	2,089
Picture Frame Workers' Union of Denmark			Merged into TAF	1970	100
Private Railway Personnel Union		1901	Merged into DJF	1984	960
Restaurant Trade Union	RBF	1990	Merged into 3F	2006	N/A
Riggers' and Sail Makers' Union		1919	Merged into DSRS	1971	257
Saddlers' and Upholsterers' Union of Denmark	Sadel	1897	Merged into ST	1984	5,071
Semi-Skilled Metal Workers' Union		1918	Merged into Metal	1957	1,500
Skilled Cooks' Union		1934	Merged into RBF	1990	1,820
Stucco Workers' Union		1920			49
Telecommunications Union	TKF	1994	Merged into Metal	2003	N/A
Union of Commercial and Clerical Employees in Denmark	HK	1900	Transferred to FH	2018	59,812
Union of State Mental Hospital Personnel					136
United Federation of Danish Workers	3F	2004	Transferred to FH	2018	N/A
Waiters' Union of Denmark		1931	Merged into RBF	1991	7,608
Watch Makers' Union					775

== Presidents ==
1898: Jens Jensen
1903: Christian Martin Olsen
1909: Carl Madsen
1929: Vilhelm Nygaard
1937: Christian Jensen
1938: Knud V. Jensen
1939: Laurits Hansen
1943: Eiler Jensen
1967: Thomas Nielsen
1982: Knud Christensen
1987: Finn Thorgrimson
1996: Hans Jensen
2007: Harald Børsting
2015: Lizette Risgaard
