= Danish Association of Social Workers =

Danish trade union

- Dansk Socialrådgiverforening
- Abbreviation: DS
- Established: 1938; 88 years ago
- Type: Trade union, professional organisation
- Location: Denmark
- Fields: Social work
- Members: 13,913 (2018)
- Official language: Danish
- Affiliations: Danish Trade Union Confederation (FH)
- Website: socialraadgiverne.dk

The Danish Association of Social Workers (Danish: Dansk Socialrådgiverforening, DS) is a professional organisation and trade union representing social workers in Denmark.

The association was founded in 1938, soon after the establishment of the first formal training course for social workers in Denmark. This makes it one of the oldest associations of social workers in the world. As of 2018, it had 13,913 members.

The association was affiliated to the Confederation of Professionals in Denmark for many years, and since 2019 has been part of its successor, the Danish Trade Union Confederation.
