= Danish Women Workers' Union =

The Danish Women Workers' Union (Danish: Kvindeligt Arbejderforbund i Danmark, KAD) was a general union representing women working in what were perceived to be lower-skilled jobs, in Denmark.

The first union for women in Denmark was founded in 1885, the "Women Workers' Union" (KAF). It initially represented cleaners and laundry workers, but from 1890 also admitted women working in factories. From 1892, it was led by Olivia Nielsen, and it expanded from Copenhagen into other cities. By 1900, it had about 1,000 members, and this led it to establish a new, national union, the "Danish Women Workers' Union", in 1901.

The union affiliated to the Danish Confederation of Trade Unions (LO), and by 1920, it organised about 20% of the women in the trade union movement. By 1997, it had 88,232 members, of whom 70% worked in the private sector. About half its members worked in production, 20% in community services, 20% in private services, and the remainder in a wide variety of sectors.

At the end of 2004, the union merged with the Danish General Workers' Union, to form the United Federation of Danish Workers.

== Presidents ==
Period as chair	Name	Image	Birth–Death
1901–1910	Olivia Nielsen		1852–1910
1910	Gudrun Bodø		1883–unknown
1910–1923	Sofie Rasmussen		1882–unknown
1923–1937	Alvilda Andersen		1875–1937
1937–1947	Fanny Jensen		1890–1969
1948–1971	Edith Olsen		1901–1996
1971–1978	Toni Grøn		1912–1995
1978–1985	Ruth Løjbert		1927–1991
1985–2005	Lillian Knudsen		1945–
