= Army Privates' and Corporals' Association =

The Army Privates' and Corporals' Association Danish: Hærens Konstabel- og Korporalforening, HKKF) is a trade union representing enlisted and conscripted ranks in the Danish Army.

The union was founded in 1959. In 1967, it became a founding constituent of the Central Association of Armed Forces Personnel (CS), but it retained considerable autonomy, and in 1982 the HKKF affiliated to the Danish Confederation of Trade Unions (LO). In 1984, it left CS, becoming independent once more, but it continued to work with the other union, the two championing increased professionalisation in the Danish military.

By 2018, the union had 4,101 members. Since 2019, it has been affiliated to LO's successor, the Danish Trade Union Confederation.
