= Homeworkers' Union =

Former trade union

The Homeworkers' Union (Danish: Husligt Arbejder Forbund, HAF) was a trade union representing social and health workers in Denmark.

The union was established on 15 November 1899 by about 30 women, as the Copenhagen Maids' Union, on the initiative of Marie Christensen. In 1904, it absorbed the Regional Maids' Union, the Odense and Region Maids' Union, and the Aalborg and Region Maids' Union, to become the Danish Service Girls' Union. In 1915, it became the Home Assistants' Trade Union.

In 1936, the Union for Home Aid and Porters at the State Hospitals merged into the union, and it thereafter also recruited men, and domestic staff in hospitals. By 1937, the union had 1,400 members. In 1946, the union changed its name again, becoming the "Homeworkers' Union".

By 1991, the union had 73,964 members, of whom 98.8% were women. From the 1980s, changes in the health and social care sectors led the union to compete for members with the Danish Municipal Workers' Union. In December 1992, the two merged, to form the Union of Public Employees (FOA).

== Presidents ==
1899: Marie Christensen
1915: Fridag Langwagen
1916: Hansigne Sandberg
1917: Marie Olsen
1918: Margrethe Agerby
1919: Marie Christensen
1927: Wilhelmine Jørgensen
1938: Andrea Jørgensen
1953: Marie Nielsen
1966: Ruth Kristensen
1979: Lilli Frederiksen
1980: Bodil Mogensen
1986: Margit Vognsen
