= FTF – Confederation of Professionals in Denmark =

FTF
- FTF – Confederation of Professionals in Denmark
- Funktionærernes og Tjenestemændenes Fællesråd
- Merged into: Danish Trade Union Confederation
- Founded: 1952
- Dissolved: 31 December 2018
- Headquarters: Copenhagen, Denmark
- Location: Denmark
- Members: 450,000 (2009)
- Key people: Bente Sorgenfrey (president))
- Affiliations: ITUC, ETUC, TUAC, NFS
- Website: www.ftf.dk

FTF – Confederation of Professionals in Denmark (Danish: FTF) was founded in 1952 and was one of the three national trade union centers, with about 80 Danish trade unions affiliated.

== History ==
The FTF was founded in 1952. At the time, the major Danish trade union centre was the Danish Confederation of Trade Unions (LO), which was affiliated to the Social Democratic Party. Many clerical unions objected to this affiliation, and founded the FTF as an unaffiliated rival. Over time, fierce rivalry with the LO turned to co-operation, and the federation also worked with the Danish Confederation of Professional Associations (AC). By 2009, the FTF had a membership of 450,000.

From 2015, FTF engaged in negotiations with LO about a potential merger. This occurred on 1 January 2019, and the LO became part of the new Danish Trade Union Confederation (FH). However, the federation's largest affiliate, the Finance Federation, along with the Danish Physiotherapists, and the Association of Designers, voted against joining FH, and instead became independent.

The FTF was affiliated with the International Trade Union Confederation (ITUC), the European Trade Union Confederation (ETUC), the Trade Union Advisory Committee to the OECD (TUAC) and the Council of Nordic Trade Unions (NFS).

== Membership ==
Members of the 86 trade unions of the FTF were typically employees with a higher education and an academic degree (e.g. a bachelor's degree or a master's degree) or a first professional degree. Some members did not have a higher education, but rather a vocational education ("white-collar workers"). A typical FTF-member occupies a middle or upper middle position in society as regards salary and pension benefits. Many FTF members were leaders.

FTF members included pharmaconomists, journalists, medical laboratory scientists, teachers, bank employees, physical therapists, businesspersons, actors, dental hygienists, police officers, podiatrists, engineers, nurses, stage directors, social workers, and radiographers.

== Affiliates ==
Union	Abbreviation	Membership (2018)
Association of Court Employees		46
Association of Danish Cemetery Managers	FDK	135
Association of Danish Chairpersons		Not recorded
Association of Danish Inseminators		173
Association of Designers		
Association of Map and Surveying Technicians	KLF	664
Association of Musicians in the Armed Forces	DMF	70
Association of Parliamentary Servants		87
Association of Technical and Administrative Officials	TAT	536
Association of the Danish Radio Symphony Orchestra		100
Aviation and Railway Trade Federation		Not recorded
BUPL	BUPL	55,480
Cabin Union Denmark		1,193
Central Association of Armed Forces Personnel	CS	8,286
CO10 Musicians' Group		Not recorded
Danish Actors' Association	DSF	1,964
Danish Association of Pharmaconomists	FF	4,541
Danish Association of Social Workers	DS	13,913
Danish Bioanalysts		Not recorded
Danish Chamber Orchestra Union		47
Danish Choir Association		62
Danish Choral Association		570
Danish Church Music Association		271
Danish Customs and Tax Association	DTS	2,592
Danish Dental Hygienists		1,828
Danish Forest and Landscape Engineers' Association		Not recorded
Danish Musicians' Union	DMF	4,883
Danish Nurses' Organization	DSR	62,770
Danish Orthopaedic Engineers' Association		41
Danish Physiotherapists		
Danish Podiatrists		1,632
Danish Police Federation		11,815
Danish Psychomotor Therapists	DAP	948
Danish Radio Media Association	MDR	228
Danish Sextons' Association		570
Danish Union of Teachers	DLF	58,179
Diet and Nutrition Association	KOST	8,230
DSL	DSL	593
Education Association		9,187
FAF	FAF	922
Finance Federation		
Frederiksberg Municipal Association	FKF	441
Free Schools' Teachers' Association	FSL	10,000
Gentofte Municipal Association	GKF	392
Greenland Organisation for Public Employees	AK	Not recorded
HI	HI	432
Insurance Association		7,839
JID	JID	1,208
Kirkekultur.nu		Not recorded
KL Staff Association		118
Midwives' Association	2,655	
National Orchestra Musicians' Joint Council		325
Occupational Therapy Association	8,802	
Organists' Association		581
Prisons Association	FFT	227
PROSA	PROSA	10,720
Public Emergency Preparedness Association	DOBL	321
Radiographers' Council	Radiograf	2,042
Radio Telegraphists' Association of 1917		Not recorded
SAFU	SAFU	914
Traffic League	TRF	610
Tourist Guides' Association		251
Viften		95

== Presidents ==
1970: Jens Christensen
1977: Kirsten Stallknecht
1984: Martin Rømer
1988: Anker Christoffersen
2003: Bente Sorgenfrey
