= Services Union (Denmark) =

Trade union in Denmark

The Services Union (Danish: Serviceforbundet) is a trade union representing white collar workers in Denmark.

The union was founded in 1911 as the Union of Insurance Officers and affiliated to the Danish Confederation of Trade Unions (LO). In time, workers from other industries joined the union, and it changed its name to the Danish Union of Professional and Technical Employees. It adopted its current name in 2009.

The union consists of 18 sectoral associations, covering banking, professionals, watchmakers and opticians, refinery technicians, hairdressers and cosmeticians, cleaning, security, dairy, and agriculture.

As of 2025, the union had 14,000 members. Since 2019, it has been affiliated to LO's successor, the Danish Trade Union Confederation.
