= HK Denmark =

Danish Labor Union

- HK Danmark
- Founded: 1900
- Headquarters: Copenhagen, Denmark
- Location: Denmark
- Members: 215,526
- Key people: Anja C. Jensen (President)
- Affiliations: FH
- Website: www.hk.dk/en

HK Denmark (Danish: HK Danmark), is a Danish trade union representing clerical workers, workers in retail, and in related industries.

The union was founded in 1900, as the Central Organisation of Danish Trade and Office Aid Associations, later becoming the Union of Commercial and Clerical Employees in Denmark. In 1932, it affiliated to the Danish Confederation of Trade Unions (LO).

By 1975, the union had 155,000 members, and this grew steadily, peaking at 360,000 members in 1999. From 1990 until 2004, it was the largest union in Denmark. In 2000, the Graphics Federation and the Railway Association both joined HK. The union's membership had since fallen, and as of 2018, it had 179,262 members, making it the second-largest union in the country.

Since 1987, the union has been organised in sectors: HK/Municipal and HK/State, for the public sector, and HK/Commerce and HK/Private, for the private sector. HK/Private was formed in 2003, when HK/Industry merged with HK/Service. Since 2019, it has been affiliated to the Danish Trade Union Confederation (FH), the successor of LO.

== Presidents ==
1900: Axel Gundel
1903: Aage Hylsted
1909: Christians Ingvoldsen
1910: Jens Johansen
1932: Julius Hansen
1938: Gustav Pedersen
1949: Erling Dinesen
1963: Henry Gran
1969: Max Harvøe
1979: Jørgen Eiberg
1993: John Dahl
2008: Kim Simonsen
2021: Anja C. Jensen
