= Trade Union Advisory Committee to the OECD =

Trade union

TUAC
- Trade Union Advisory Committee to the OECD
- Founded: 1948
- Headquarters: Paris, France
- Location: International
- Members: Approx. 60 million 59 unions in 32 OECD countries
- Key people: Liz Shuler (President); Veronica Nilsson (General Secretary)
- Website: www.tuac.org

The Trade Union Advisory Committee to the OECD (TUAC) is the interface of the Organisation for Economic Co-operation and Development (OECD) with organized labour. TUAC has 59 affiliated trade union centres in 32 OECD countries, representing more than 60 million workers. It also has five associate members in Brazil, Bulgaria, Indonesia, Peru, and South Africa.

== History ==
In recent years, TUAC has focused on the response to the economic crisis, stressing the need for anti-crisis policies that stimulate growth and protect and create jobs, together with stronger regulation of the financial sector. TUAC calls for a paradigm shift in the underlying economic model so as to deliver a stronger global economy that reduces income inequality. It supports policies that promote aggregate demand, green growth, sustainable and inclusive development, responsible long-term investments and financial markets, as well as fair and progressive tax systems.

To this end, TUAC actively participates in various OECD Committees and conferences, including the OECD Forum and Ministerial Council Meeting.

TUAC and the International Trade Union Confederation (ITUC) co-ordinate trade union input to the G20 and G7, formerly G8 summits, and their ministerial meetings, through the L20 and L7 groups, i.e. the trade union groupings from the participating countries. TUAC took part in the G20 Employment Task Force and Sherpa meetings, as well as in social partners' consultations with Ministers and Leaders. It also co-ordinated trade union input in the book Exiting from the crisis: towards a model of more equitable and sustainable growth. TUAC and the International Trade Union Confederation (ITUC) coordinate input to G7 summits and G7 labour and employment ministerial meetings.

TUAC and its Global Union partners have also contributed to the update of the OECD Guidelines for Multinational Enterprises. TUAC has launched a database and website of trade union cases submitted under the Guidelines since 2000.
