= International Textile, Garment and Leather Workers' Federation =

ITGLWF
- International Textile, Garment and Leather Workers' Federation
- Merged into: IndustriALL Global Union
- Founded: 5 June 1970
- Dissolved: June 2012
- Headquarters: Brussels, Belgium
- Website: www.itglwf.org

The International Textile, Garment and Leather Workers' Federation (ITGLWF) was a global union federation. In 2005 it had 217 member organizations in 110 countries, representing a combined membership of over 10 million workers.

== History ==
The ITGLWF was founded in 1970 as a result of the merger of the International Textile and Garment Workers' Federation and the International Shoe and Leather Workers' Federation. These organizations were preceded by much older ones: the International Glove Workers' Union was founded in 1892, the International Secretariat of Shoemakers in 1893, and the International Secretariat of Leather Workers in 1896. The International Federation of Textile Workers' Associations originated in 1894 and the International Tailors' Secretariat in 1896.

The organization held a congress every four years, consisting of delegates from the member organisations. The congress established the broad lines of the ITGLWF's policies and actions.

The organisation's headquarters was located in Brussels, Belgium. There were four regional organisations within the ITGLWF: FITTVCC/ORI, the Americas' regional organisation, based in Venezuela; ITGLWF/ERO, the European regional organisation, based in Belgium; TWARO, the Asian regional organisation, based in Japan; and ARCC, the African Regional Consultative Council, based in South Africa.

The ITGLWF worked closely with the International Trade Union Confederation and the other global union federations.

In 2007, the International Federation Textile-Clothing, a former affiliate of the World Confederation of Labour, merged into the ITGLWF. In June 2012 affiliates of ITGLWF joined the new global federation IndustriALL Global Union.

== Affiliates ==
In 1979, the following unions were affiliated to the federation:

Union	Country	Affiliated membership
Associacion Obrera Textil	Argentina	280,000
Federacion Argentina de Trabajadores del Cuero y Afines	Argentina	30,000
Federacion Obrera Nacional de la Industria del Vestido	Argentina	60,000
Sindicato de Emploeados Textiles de la Industria y Afines	Argentina	27,000
Union de Cortadores de Confeccion Medidas y Afines	Argentina	3,800
Australian Textile Workers' Union	Australia	32,885
Australian Boot Trade Employees' Federation	Australia	8,648
Clothing and Allied Trades Union of Australia	Australia	30,000
Union of Textile, Clothing and Leather Workers	Austria	54,000
Bangladesh Textile Workers' League	Bangladesh	42,000
North Bengal Handloom Workers' League	Bangladesh	100,000
General Union	Belgium	2,511
Union of Clothing Workers and Kindred Trades in Belgium	Belgium	16,000
Union of Belgian Textile Workers	Belgium	41,000
Syndicat National des Travailleurs du Textile, Habillement et Cuir	Benin	350
Sindicato Textil "Texas"	Bolivia	Unknown
Sindicato Forno	Bolivia	600
Sindicato Textil "Estatex"	Bolivia	250
Federacao dos Trabalhadores nas Industrias de Fiacao e Tecelagem	Brazil	30,000
Federacao dos Trabalhadores nas Industrias de Fiacao e Tecelagem do Estado de São Paulo	Brazil	38,000
Federacion de Emploeados Textiles	Chile	640
Chinese Federation of Labour	Taiwan	75,122
Union de Trabajadores Textiles de Colombia	Colombia	16,000
Sindicato Nacional de Trabajadores de la Industria del Cuero de Colombia	Colombia	800
Sindicato de Celanse Colombiana	Colombia	850
Sindicato de Trabajadores de Manhattan de Colombia	Colombia	400
Sindicato Nacional de las Industrias Textil, Vestuario y Conexos	Colombia	600
Sindicato Textil Sedeco-Coltejer	Colombia	11,000
Sindicato Industrial de Trabajadores Textiles y de la Confeccion	Costa Rica	Unknown
Cyprus Industrial and Hotel Employees' Federation	Cyprus	1,200
Danish Clothing Workers' Union	Denmark	15,900
Danish Shoemakers' Union	Denmark	2,650
Danish Textile Workers' Union	Denmark	16,195
Saddlemakers' and Upholsterers' Union of Denmark	Denmark	1,100
Federacion de Trabajadores de la Industria Textil, Vestuario y Cuero	Ecuador	3,520
Textile and Clothing Workers' Union	Finland	47,512
National Federation of Textiles	France	20,000
General Federation of Hides and Skins and Clothing	France	20,000
Leather Union	West Germany	54,417
Textile and Clothing Union	West Germany	279,885
Industrial and Commercial Workers' Union	Ghana	17,500
Northern Carpet Trades Union	United Kingdom	2,183
National Union of Dyers, Bleachers and Textile Workers	United Kingdom	58,756
National Union of Hosiery and Knitwear Workers	United Kingdom	71,626
National Union of Tailors and Garment Workers	United Kingdom	112,583
Felt Hatters' and Trimmers' Unions of Great Britain	United Kingdom	1,719
National Union of Footwear, Leather and Allied Trades	United Kingdom	62,072
Rossendale Union of Boot, Shoe and Slipper Operatives	United Kingdom	6,107
Amalgamated Textile Workers' Union	United Kingdom	40,000
Amalgamated Society of Textile Workers and Kindred Trades	United Kingdom	5,517
Union of Jute, Flax and Kindred Textile Operatives	United Kingdom	1,740
Association of Scientific, Technical and Managerial Staffs	United Kingdom	1,000
British Federation of Textile Technicians	United Kingdom	4,000
Greek Textiles Federation	Greece	10,000
Federation of Greek Leather Workers	Greece	5,000
Federacion Nacional de Obreros de la Industria Textil del Vestido y Similares	Guatemala	3,220
General Workers' Union	Guyana	240
Sindicato Industrial de Trabajadores del Vestuari	Honduras	650
Cotton Industry Workers' General Union	Hong Kong	3,860
Indian National Textile Workers' Federation	India	415,836
Hind Mazdoor Sabha	India	92,780
Indian National Leather Workers' Federation	India	8,155
National Labour Organisation	India	180,000
Indonesian Textile and Garment Workers' Union	Indonesia	200,000
Irish Transport and General Workers' Union	Ireland	20,000
Irish Shoe and Leather Workers' Union	Ireland	3,500
National Union of Textile, Garment and Leather Workers	Israel	50,000
Italian Federation of Textile and Clothing Workers	Italy	120,000
Italian Union of Textile and Clothing Workers	Italy	50,000
National Workers' Union of Jamaica	Jamaica	Unknown
Japan Federation of Textile Workers' Unions	Japan	473,177
Kenya Shoe and Leather Workers' Union	Kenya	6,000
Kenya Tailors' and Textile Workers' Union	Kenya	11,600
Korean National Textile Workers' Union	South Korea	144,985
Syndicats des Ouvriers et Ouvrières du Tricot du Liban	Lebanon	300
Confédération des Travailleurs Malgaches	Madagascar	Unknown
Johore State Textile and Garment Workers' Union	Malaysia	3,260
General Workers' Union	Malta	3,631
Sindicato de Trabajadores de la Industria Textil y Similares	Mexico	30,000
Sindicato de Trabajadores y Trabajadores de la Industria de la Costura Ciro Mendoza	Mexico	2,520
Sindicato Textiles Rio Blanco	Mexico	3,000
Industrial Workers' Union NVV	Netherlands	7,520
New Zealand Federation Footwear Trade Industrial Association of Workers	New Zealand	4,500
Nigerian Textile, Garment and General Workers' Union	Nigeria	24,305
Garment Workers' Union	Norway	18,236
All-Pakistan Confederation of Labour	Pakistan	77,963
Federacion de Trabajadores de la Industria Textil del Vestuario y Cuero de Panama	Panama	680
Federacion de Trabajadores de la Industria Textil del Vestuario y Afines del Paraguay	Paraguay	3,200
Federacion de Trabajadores en Tejidos del Peru	Peru	18,000
National Union of Cordage, Garment and Textile Workers	Philippines	15,000
Rhodesian Tailors' and Garment Workers' Union	Rhodesia	3,366
United Textile Workers' Union of Rhodesia	Rhodesia	7,781
United Shoe, Leather and Allied Workers' Union	Rhodesia	5,145
Pioneer Industries Employees' Union	Singapore	3,896
Singapore Industrial Labour Organisation	Singapore	3,038
South African Federation of Leather Trade Unions	South Africa	30,000
Textile Workers' Industrial Union	South Africa	4,976
Garment Workers' Union of South Africa	South Africa	7,954
National Union of Clothing Workers	South Africa	25,000
Garment Workers' Union of the Western Province	South Africa	42,000
Garment Workers' Industrial Union	South Africa	11,000
National Union of Textile Workers	South Africa	3,500
African Garment Workers' Benefit Fund	South Africa	1,000
Knitted Fabric Workers' Union	South Africa	60
Textile Workers' Union	South Africa	1,000
Saint Lucia Workers' Union	St Lucia	Unknown
Fédération des Traveilleurs du Textile, du Vêtements et due Cuir de STV	Spain	1,000
Federacion del Textil, Confeccion, Cuero y Calzado del Estado Espanol	Spain	80,000
Swedish Textile, Garment and Leather Workers' Union	Sweden	53,573
Sveriges Arbetsledereforbund	Sweden	1,791
Swiss Clothing, Leather and Equipment Workers' Union	Switzerland	4,370
Union of Textiles, Chemicals and Paper	Switzerland	4,000
Syndicat des Travailleurs des Industries, réunies du Togo	Togo	3,000
Union of Commercial and Industrial Workers	Trinidad and Tobago	4,918
Fédération Générale des Professions Diverses	Tunisia	30,000
Textile, Knitting and Clothing Workers' Union of Turkey	Turkey	120,000
Turkish Shoe and Leather Workers' Union	Turkey	6,000
United Hatters, Cap and Millinery Workers International Union	United States	Unknown
Amalgamated Meat Cutters and Butcher Workmen of North America	United States	30,000
International Leather Goods Plastic and Novelty Workers Union	United States	38,000
United Shoe Workers of America	United States	44,451
United Textile Workers of America	United States	20,000
International Ladies Garment Workers Union	United States	365,346
Amalgamated Clothing and Textile Workers Union	United States	485,000
Federation of Leather, Textile, Shoe and Allied Workers	Upper Volta	200
Federacion Obrera Nacional de Trabajadores Textiles del Cuero y del Vestuario	Uruguay	Unknown
Federacion de Trabajadores de la Industria Textil, Confeccion y sus Similares de Venezuela	Venezuela	22,000

== Leadership ==
=== General Secretaries ===
1970: Jack Greenhalgh
1971: Charles Ford
1988: Neil Kearney
2009: Patrick Itschert
2011: Klaus Priegnitz

=== Presidents ===
1970: John Newton
1972: Karl Buschmann
1980: Harold Gibson
1984: Karl-Erik Persson
1988: Berthold Keller
1992: David Lambert
1996: Peter Booth
2004: Manfred Schallmeyer
2009: Hisanobu Shimada

== See also ==
- Trade Union International of Textile, Leather and Fur Workers Unions
