= Hitchin Boys' School =

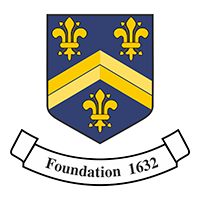

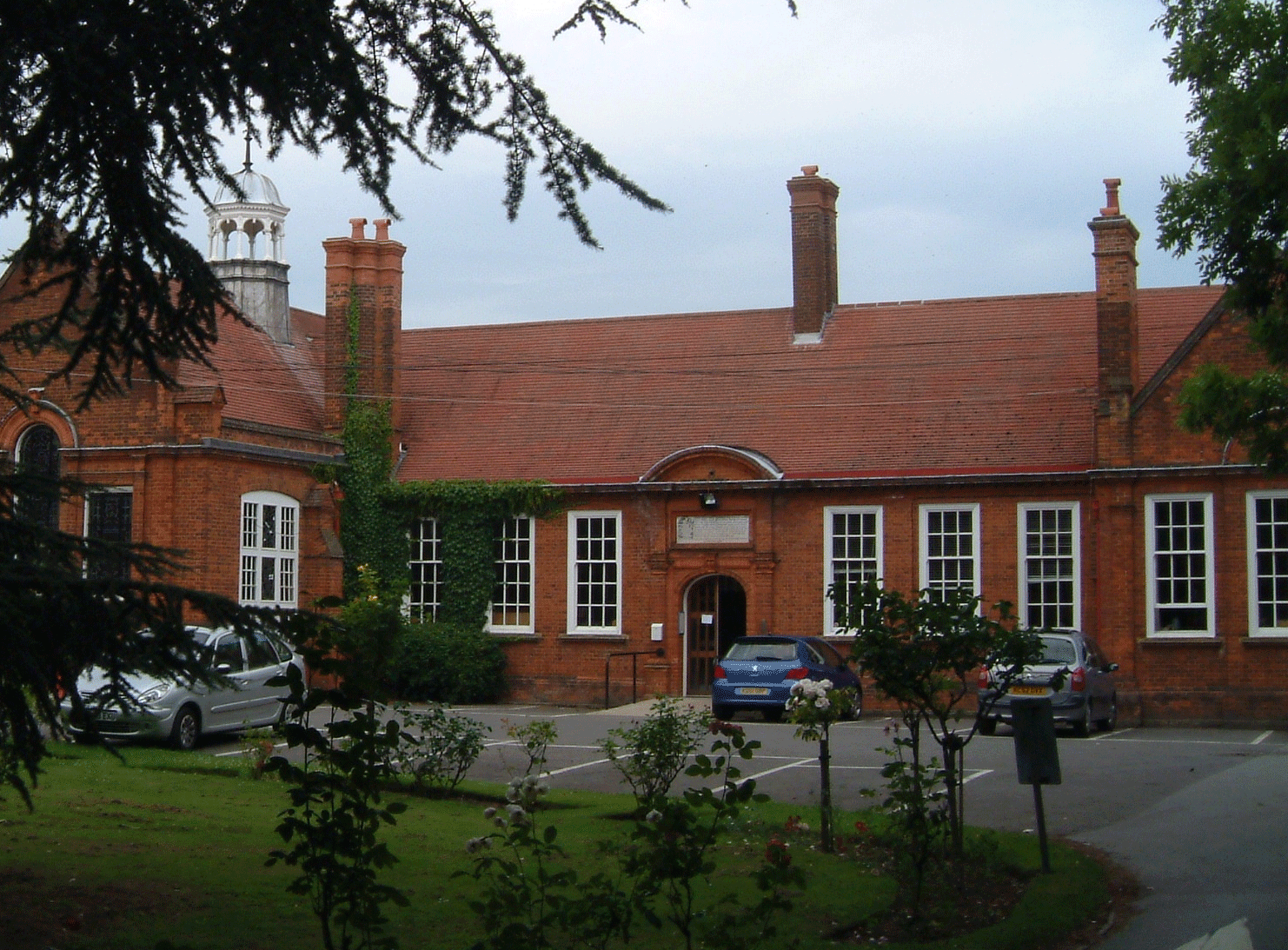
- Hitchin Boys' School

Location
- Grammar School Walk; Hitchin, Hertfordshire, SG5 1JB; England; 51°57′04″N 0°16′43″W

Information
- Type: 11–18 boys Academy
- Motto: Latin: Per ardua ad alta (Striving for Excellence)
- Established: July 25, 1632; 394 years ago
- Founder: John Mattocke
- Local authority: North Hertfordshire
- Department for Education URN: 139154 Tables
- Ofsted: Reports
- Principal: Luke Bennett
- Gender: Boys
- Age range: 11–18
- Enrolment: 1255 (2021)
- Capacity: 1247
- Houses: Pierson; Mattocke; Radcliffe; Skynner
- Colour
- Publication: The Chronicle
- Affiliations: Hitchin Girls' School; The Priory School
- Alumni: Old Boys Association
- Website: www.hbs.herts.sch.uk

Hitchin Boys' School (HBS) is an 11–18 boys academy-status secondary school, with sixth form, located in Hitchin, Hertfordshire, England. Founded in 1632 by John Mattocke, the single-sex school currently educates around 1,500 boys. The sixth form is part of a consortium for wider teaching with other schools in the town, mixing some classes with pupils from Hitchin Girls' School and The Priory School.

== History ==
=== Establishment ===
Hitchin Boys' School was founded on 25 July 1632 by John Mattocke. Originally it was an Old Free School, and its first headmaster was Thomas Heyndy. The rigours of the English Civil War put strain on the teaching at the school, especially as boys were more inclined to watch Oliver Cromwell pass through Hitchin. In 1664 William Patricke succeeded Heyndy as Headmaster. He relaxed the rules of the school, allowing laxer and simpler Latin as well as more English and Mathematics lessons to be taught in the "Free and Easy School", as Patricke put it.

=== 17th century ===
In 1680 Richard Stone became the third Headmaster of the School. He did not know anything about Classics and preferred to live "in the quiet enjoyment of the school". This allowed the students to become lazier than under Patricke, and the Trustees at the school were forced to endure a testing period. After Stone's death in 1691 Sir Ralph Radcliffe employed a new Headmaster – Thomas Cheyney – who invoked discipline and original Latin. Under Cheyney and his successor, Thomas Harris, school life was good, but a fallout between Radcliffe and his co-trustees brought the school to the brink again, and when Harris died in 1709 Radcliffe and Laurence Tristam – another School Trustee – appointed the new Headmaster – James Lawrence – without consulting the other Trustees.

However, the Trustees hatched a counter-attack to this, and summoned the Reverend Richard Finch from London to the School so that when Lawrence, Tristam and Radcliffe arrived, the School had been overthrown. The matter went to a "Chancery suit", and in the end the defence were defeated by a strong argument for putting Finch in the job, with Lawrence proved incapable of teaching. A new board of Trustees was formed, five by the prosecution and four by the defendants.

=== A new chapter ===
The Reverend Richard Finch retired in 1720, having created a storm by teaching the boys too well and raising them far above their working-class backgrounds. As a result, the people of Hitchin wanted James Lawrence in the job, and he was forced back into the Mastership by order of a local judge and the people of Hitchin's support. It was not an unmitigated disaster, but Lawrence could not do the job with the same gusto that Finch had. In 1730 the Reverend Mark Hildesley was appointed in Hitchin. He left in 1755 when he became Bishop of Sodor and Man.

The School entered into debt after the Chancery suit of 1709, and after the death of James Lawrence in 1741 a London lawyer called Dodson seized property for debt repayment, became receiver of the trust property and appointed a new Headmaster – John Lyle – to teach at the salary of £17, a very low sum at the time for a Master. The School became more associated with the local church in 1750 when Lyle became the Parish Clerk, with the boys attending church on Wednesday and Friday mornings with Edward Radcliffe. When protests broke out about this, the Lord Chancellor ruled in 1750 that Dodson had to be paid a further £63 in debt repayment with his understudy John Lyle to resign and a new Headmaster – Richard Snell – to be appointed.

But in 1779, Snell was deemed incapable of the "Duties and Business of his place" by the Board of Trustees, and a new Master, William Reynolds, was chosen. He reduced truancy. Visits from the School Carpenter also became rarer. When Reynolds died in 1819 the School had returned to normal. One unfortunate incident occurred in that same year, when Paynes Park was deemed not to be a part of the Boys' School. There were numerous protests, some from men of Hitchin, some from the students, but despite this Paynes Park was taken away and the Boys' School was forced to share Butts' Close with other Hitchin boys.

The succeeding Headmaster was the Reverend Joseph Niblock, writer of The New Improved Classical Latin and English Dictionary in 1825. He spent only 11 of his 25 years in teaching at Hitchin. The School schedule at that point was a 9 o' clock start and finishing at 12 noon every day except for Wednesday and Friday when the School was closed for public prayer at St Mary's Church. Thursday and Saturday working hours were extended until 3 o' clock in the afternoon as a result. Niblock was also said to be "one of the best Greek scholars in England", and a Greek grammar book that he wrote was in use for many years at Eton College, among other public schools.

=== Discipline scheme ===
Reports were sent many times during the school year to the Board of Trustees, mainly with discipline reports. There were four classes of conduct: Best, Second Best, Third Class and Fourth Class. There was also a progress rank, from Great to None. As a result, some students received terrible progress ranks but excellent conduct marks. Niblock was very severe when it came to discipline. Suspensions and expulsions were very common, with some students taken out of the School for the punishments they received. When a severe 'crime' was committed the School became a Court of Justice, with culprits becoming 'the accused' and taking evidence on oath. One case saw eight witnesses called to the stand, and a resulting verdict of guilt, with a punishment of suspension – to satisfy the Trustees – and then expulsion upon two boys; one of these boys was found to have committed the crime of "affrontery", and he was expelled for good. The other boy was reinstated upon a letter being written by his father regarding his son's poor conduct.

=== End of Free School ===
Niblock's usher was a young man called Samuel Goodwin, a man Niblock had taught himself. However thanks to an anonymous letter sent to Niblock, the Reverend determined that Goodwin was an impostor, and expelled him for a breach of rules.

In 1828, a new batch of Trustees were appointed including Lord Dacre (1774–1851), who would in 1929 be commemorated in the name of Wilshere Dacre Primary School found opposite the School grounds. Goodwin's expulsion had caused him to set up a school himself, subsequently reducing numbers in the Free School. The new Trustees passed a new set of rules for the School, including a leaving age of 15, a minimum entrance age of 8, twice school yearly examinations and most importantly, an immediate payment of £500 by any incoming Headmaster into a bond as insurance against discharge or death. The latter caused the resignation of Niblock in 1835; he could not cope with the payments and left, dying in 1842 with two daughters surviving him. His successors were the Reverend William Hopewood, who resigned in 1832, the Reverend E.C. Cumberbatch, who resigned in 1835, and the Reverend W.B. Dyntram, a man who felt he was more important than both students and the Trustees. Seen as a "Blockhead", he soon resigned in 1838, passing power to the last Free School Headmaster John Sugars.

Sugars was a man of education, particularly regarding foreign languages. But he came to the School in its twilight years, and in its twice yearly examinations the Vicar of Hitchin at that time, the Reverend Canon Lewis Hensley, found more and more depressing results, with only four boys taking Latin in 1872. One did Greek but no English and Mathematics was woefully poor. There was no improvement and eventually Sugars had a mental breakdown in 1876. The Trustees closed the School and paid Sugars a small pension.

=== 19th and 20th centuries ===
In 1888 the great debate regarding the quality of schools and their students was resolved, with a new proposal of a higher education school, the British School being one example designed for the poorer members of the community. So it was that Frederic Seebohm formed a Scheme, one that would provide for both the girls and boys of Hitchin. Already Dame Mary Radcliffe and Vicar Hildesley (not a relation to Mark Hildelsey) had founded the Girls' School, and so the Boys' School was born again. Natural Science, Drawing and English Grammar were among the subjects to be compulsory teaching for the School. The School was now fee-paying, occasionally £12 a year, sometimes £6 a year.

Now the problem of a site arose. Thanks to donations from several wealthy families, including Seebohm's, the Scheme decided to purchase land known as the Woodlands in Bancroft. It was here that the new School opened on 1 May 1889, its first Headmaster Joseph Edward Little of Lincoln College, Oxford. Ironically, when the ownership of the land was examined it was found to have been John Mattocke's previously. In the beginning the Girls' and Boys' School were both in the large Portmill Lane building, but within two years the new buildings for the Boys' School were ready, and Portmill was free for the Girls' School to do with as they pleased. Compulsory education was still young, and Hitchin was still a market town that saw manual work as a better alternative to written education. Parents removed students if discipline was implemented, set homework was not completed and attendance was poor. In 1897 Little left, dying in 1935.

Jabez King came to the Headmaster's job in January 1898 with just 24 pupils in the School and full permission to do whatever it would take to repair the situation. He was a former Oxford University student with an M.A. in Classics and English. A fearless climber, he placed the traditional chamber pot on one of the spires. He felt a change in discipline was needed so that beatings were rarer, but still occurred in matters such as bullying. Occasionally the Headmaster would make several students swap a lesson of Scripture for an hour of cleaning out the chicken coops and the cow sheds down by the entrance from Bancroft. The School groundsman and cow-herd were summoned with the use of King's megaphone from his Oxford years, and often he left the School on Tuesdays to take part in the local Farmers' Market. Often the running of the School was left to Second Master Freddie Jones. School funds had balanced out again by the end of the 19th century, and in 1908 the School was able to start the Junior Preparatory School for younger boys that would now go to primary and junior schools. A small interview was conducted and if King – the interrogator – liked the boy, he was admitted. The School tuck shop began in 1910, and the following year tar paving was laid in the School Quad to stop excessive amounts of mud getting into the School.

The First World War began soon after, but School life remained about the same. While letters from Old Boys in the fight were placed in the School Chronicle, a prefect system became prominent in 1915, and funds for the war established. Allotments and plots for growing vegetables also emerged in the School fields. The House system began in 1920, but lapsed in 1922 before being revived in that same year due to the change in School schedule of Wednesday becoming a School day and Saturday being a Games day. By 1925 the system had changed twice more, but to the names of Mattocke, Pierson, Skynner and Radcliffe after John Mattocke, Joseph Pierson, Ralph Skynner and the Radcliffe family, all of whom had been School benefactors. In 1926 Jabez King retired, with 265 students at the School. King died in 1931.

=== Post WWI ===
Thomas Ernest Jones was the third Headmaster of the new Hitchin Boys' Grammar School in 1926. During his time canings were regular, detention automatic for lateness during the General Strike or any other time, and staff regularly carpeted, who left in small droves in the early years of Jones's rule. His motto was "Good manners, good work, good games".

In school, the House Points Scheme was established, with only deductions seemingly of points, not additions, with punishments for those students with the most penalty deductions. The Work and Conduct Cup – now retired and replaced by the Times Shield – was awarded to the House with the least deductions. In 1930 work began on the creation of the main building of the school, and in the autumn of 1931 it was ready for moving into, including the Main Hall, the modern-day Art Rooms, the modern-day Modern Foreign Languages Rooms, the modern-day Science Department and the modern-day Business Studies Room. The former Hall became the Dining Room, the former Science Block the Library and the Art Room the Scout Hut, which is now disused. Trophies and prizes became more prominent in the Jones era, and school uniform became prominent at this time.

With the advent of the Second World War, the arches in the new North Court were sandbagged, with discounts on food and milk established and eating habits changed with the addition of compulsory non-meat meals such as spaghetti cheese. School allotments sprouted up again, but as more of a detention task than required vegetable sources. The force call-ups became more and more regular, and the names of the dead were read at morning assembly. The School trees were felled to provide wood for the War effort, but in 1944 an even bigger change took place in School life. No longer would students pay for school – they would compete under examination. In 1953 Thomas Jones retired.

=== 1950s–present ===
The school was a grammar school until 1974, when it became a comprehensive school. The school's present site has expanded since its establishment. It began in 1889 as a building known as the 'Schoolhouse', a dining hall (now the school's library), the headmaster's office (part of the present-day reception) and the school hall. The large present-day complex was not established until 1930, as can be determined by a close inspection at the top (or bottom) of the complex's drains. In the 1980s a new building was added with an I.T. suite for graphics lessons, a cookery classroom and a large classroom.

In the 1960s a Memorial Pavilion was established honouring the dead of the Second World War. In the late 1960s the original Lower School Block was created. In 2018 it was demolished and replaced with a building on the same site. In the 1990s the School built a sports centre next to the Lower School Block. It also became a local Sports Centre for Hitchin and Hertfordshire, allowing for fitness, badminton, basketball and volleyball sessions among other sports. Conferences can also take place there.

In 2003 construction started on the creation of a Sixth Form Centre (previously the Sixth Form had been forced to establish base in the former School Stables). It was completed in the summer of 2005 and took its first intake of Sixth Formers in September of that year. The school converted to academy status on 1 January 2013. In 2019, a performing arts block was completed, with an auditorium and music classrooms.

== Overview ==
=== Traditions ===
As with many former grammar schools, there are (and were) several traditions at Hitchin Boys' School that have been discontinued or continue to this day.

Founders' Day, normally on 1 July, was originally a large ceremony. All of the students would go to St Mary's Church, accompanied by their teachers, and listen to a large service. Nowadays only the Sixth Form and Year 11 students continue this tradition. Founders' Day also signalled the arrival of the School's Swimming Competition. This was terminated, then revived in 2006 to take place on the afternoon of Founders' Day.

Also taking place on Founders' Day is the presentation of the Times Shield to the winning house in that year's house league. The four houses are still an important part of school life and culture, with many inter-house competitions taking place throughout the year. These competitions span the full bredth of school life; sports, academics, and the creative and performing arts.

Originally to help sports competitions within the school, the students were divided into four houses called Red, Yellow, Green and Blue. Later these were changed to Cambridge Line, Main Line, Hitchin Line and School, the separation being based upon the distribution of homes. Although the school was split into Houses before 1920 this lapsed and was re-introduced in the summer of 1925. The names of the four men who were associated with the Old Free House were chosen as titles, Mattocke, Skynner, Radcliffe and Pierson.

=== Sports Day ===
The School Sports Day is also a popular attraction at the school. It began in 1890 when it was held at the Bedford Road football field, including the Hitchin Volunteers. When Jabez King came to the school he realised that it could be used as a fund-raiser on Whit Mondays. As a result, the Sports Day became enjoyed not only by the boys, but also by the townsfolk of Hitchin. Boys could enter as many races as they liked for a small fee, which went to the school. Early prizes included malacca canes, toast racks and cycle lamps, with third place's prize (a pen-knife) used as a way of encouraging competitors to strive for better placings. Alongside the serious athletic events there were also novelty events to keep spectators amused, such as the Fathers' Race. During the First World War prizes were often donated to the War Fund, and the event was kept going by the number of local soldiers who wished to take part. Medals were engraved with Hitchin Grammar School-The War 1915 and distributed by the Lieutenant Colonel of the Scottish Signals Service.

After the War inter-house competition became the main focus of the Sports Day, with the Times Shield becoming the main prize and prizes of small cups and medals awarded instead, bought by cash donations. In 1924 the Victor Ludorum Cup was first awarded, to the boy who gained the most points on Sports Day. In 1926 T.E. Jones changed Sports Day to the first Wednesday, and later a mid-June Saturday. The townsfolk of Hitchin were excluded from the event, with only parents and invited guests being spectators to the event. In 1931 the Junior Victor Ludorum award was first awarded and the Sports Day became Sports Days, with general races on the first days and inter-house events on a second day. This was reverted the following year. During the Second World War, the Sports Day was run as per normal. In 1948 the javelin and discus throwing were introduced to the event, followed by the shot put in 1952 and hop, step and jump in 1958. Even hammer throwing was tried, but the danger of the event (because of the lack of a cage) forced its stoppage. In 1955, after the arrival of M.G. Dolden in 1953, Sports Day was moved to May, a Victor Ludorum Cup was introduced for the intermediate years (14–16), the novelty races were scrapped completely, the tug-of-war was dropped as the finale and the Hitchin Town Band stopped playing at the event, making it school-only for the first time since 1899.

=== Notable former pupils ===
- Ben Hull, actor
- Ben Wilmot, footballer for Stoke City F.C.
- Ben Lawson (basketball), Pro basketball player for Rizing Zephyr Fukuoka
- Joe Worsley, rugby player
- Paul Van Carter, film producer
- James Bay, singer-songwriter
- Kevin Phillips, footballer
- Ian Poulter, golfer
- Robert Newman, comedian
- Sir Peter Bonfield CBE, Chief executive from 1996 to 2002 of BT
- Frederic Chapman, publisher
- D.G.E. Hall, South East Asia historian
- Dr Robin Holliday, molecular biologist
- John Holloway, Baroque violinist and conductor
- Paul Jesson, actor
- David Lambert, General President from 1975 to 1990 of the National Union of Hosiery and Knitwear Workers and from 1991 to 1994 of the National Union of Knitwear, Footwear & Apparel Trades
- Peter Mason, journalist and author
- John Pratt, Canadian politician
- E. H. Visiak, writer
- Richard Whitmore, former BBC newsreader in the 1970s
- Alfred Mendes, writer
