= International Textile and Garment Workers' Federation =

The International Textile and Garment Workers' Federation (ITGWF) was a global union federation of unions representing workers involved in manufacturing clothing and other textiles.

The federation was established on 17 June 1960 at conference in Copenhagen, when the International Federation of Textile Workers' Associations (IFTWA) merged with the International Garment Workers' Federation (IGWF).

The federation was led by general secretary Jack Greenhalgh, formerly leader of the IFTWA, president John Newton, formerly leader of the IGWF, and vice-president Alphonse Baeyens.

On 5 June 1970, at a conference in Folkestone in England, the federation merged with the International Shoe and Leather Workers' Federation to form the International Textile, Garment and Leather Workers' Federation.

== Affiliates ==
In 1960, the following unions were affiliated to the federation:

| Union | Country | Affiliated membership |
|---|---|---|
| Alliance of Textile Workers' Unions | South Korea | 37,479 |
| Amalgamated Clothing Workers of America | United States | 376,000 |
| Amalgamated Felt Hat Trimmers, Woolformers and Allied Workers Union | United Kingdom | 2,073 |
| Clothing and Hat Federation | France | Unknown |
| Danish Clothing Workers' Union | Denmark | 19,131 |
| Danish Textile Workers' Union | Denmark | 19,355 |
| Federation of Textile Workers of Greece | Greece | 40,000 |
| Federation of Textile Workers of Peru | Peru | 25,000 |
| Garment Workers' Industrial Union | South Africa | 5,000 |
| Garment Workers' Union of the Cape Peninsula | South Africa | 14,500 |
| General Industrial Union of Textiles and Clothing | Netherlands | 17,332 |
| International Ladies' Garment Workers' Union | United States | 442,901 |
| United Italian Federation of Clothing Workers | Italy | 55,186 |
| Italian Federation of Textile Workers | Italy | 120,000 |
| Italian Union of Textile Workers | Italy | 20,000 |
| Japan Federation of Textile Workers' Unions | Japan | 320,000 |
| National Federation of Textile and Needle Industry Trades | Cuba | 23,000 |
| National Federation of Textiles | France | 18,000 |
| National Union of Dyers, Bleachers and Textile Workers | United Kingdom | 68,596 |
| National Union of Hosiery Workers | United Kingdom | 40,660 |
| National Union of Tailors and Garment Workers | United Kingdom | 120,998 |
| National Union of Textile Workers | Colombia | 20,000 |
| National Union of Textile Workers | Israel | 13,000 |
| Norwegian Union of Clothing Workers | Norway | 14,409 |
| Norwegian Union of Textile Workers | Norway | 9,741 |
| Pakistan Textile Workers' Federation | Pakistan | 20,000 |
| Swedish Clothing Workers' Union | Sweden | 37,164 |
| Swedish Textile Workers' Union | Sweden | 37,588 |
| Swiss Clothing, Leather and Equipment Workers' Union | Switzerland | 3,360 |
| Tailors, Tents, Sailmakers and Garment Workers' Union | Kenya | 549 |
| Textile and Clothing Union | West Germany | 354,118 |
| Textile and Knitting Workers' Union | Finland | 5,000 |
| Textile Workers Union of America | United States | 197,200 |
| Union of Belgian Textile Workers | Belgium | 65,190 |
| Union of Clothing Workers | Finland | 3,103 |
| Union of Clothing Workers and Kindred Trades in Belgium | Belgium | 9,500 |
| Union of Shop, Distributive and Allied Workers | United Kingdom | 15,000 |
| Union of Textile, Clothing and Leather Workers | Austria | 69,000 |
| Union of Textile and Factory Workers | Switzerland | 12,000 |
| United Hatters, Cap and Millinery Workers International Union | United States | 40,000 |
| United Textile Factory Workers' Association | United Kingdom | 172,770 |
