= George Browett =

British trade union leader

George Frederick Browett (8 December 1928 – November 1994) was a British trade union leader.

Born in Northampton, Northamptonshire, Browett began working in a footwear factory when he was sixteen. He joined the National Union of Boot and Shoe Operatives (NUBSO), and began working full-time as a union organiser in 1965. NUBSO became part of the National Union of the Footwear, Leather and Allied Trades (NUFLAT), and Browett continued in post. In 1988, he was elected as general secretary of the union, and he became prominent on the Trades Union Congress' Textile, Clothing and Footwear Industries Committee.

The footwear and leather industry was in decline, so, working with Bob Stevenson, Browett organised a merger between NUFLAT and the National Union of Hosiery and Knitwear Workers, forming the National Union of Knitwear, Footwear and Apparel Trades. He was appointed as the union's first general secretary, but retired in September 1992. He died two years later.

Trade union offices
Preceded by Gordon Stewart	General Secretary of the National Union of the Footwear, Leather and Allied Trades; 1988–1991	Succeeded by Union merged
Preceded by New position	General Secretary of the National Union of Knitwear, Footwear and Apparel Trades; 1991–1992	Succeeded by Helen McGrath
