= German Clothing Workers' Union =

Former German Reich trade union (1888–1933)

- Deutscher Bekleidungsarbeiter-Verband
- Predecessor: Travel Support Association of German Tailors
- Successor: Industrial Union of Clothing (E Germany), Textile and Clothing Union (W Germany)
- Founded: 1 October 1888
- Dissolved: May 1933
- Headquarters: 15 Wusterhausener Straße, Berlin
- Location: Germany
- Members: 77,884 (1928)
- Publication: Bekleidungsarbeiter
- Affiliations: ADGB, ICWF

The German Clothing Workers' Union (German: Deutscher Bekleidungsarbeiter-Verband, DBAV) was a trade union representing people involved in making clothing in Germany.

The union was founded in 1888 as the German Union of Tailors. It changed its name frequently until 1894, when it became the Union of Tailors, Dressmakers and Kindred Trades. In 1907, the Union of Lingerie and Tie Workers in Germany merged in, and it renamed itself as the Union of Tailors and Dressmakers in Germany.

After World War I, the union was a founding constituent of the General German Trade Union Confederation. In 1924, it was joined by the German Furriers' Union, and by 1928, it had 77,884 members. In 1933, it was banned by the Nazi government. After World War II, the Textile and Clothing Union was formed to represent clothing workers.

== Presidents ==
1888: Karl Neißler
1890: Friedrich Holzhäußer
1903: Heinrich Stühmer
1920: Martin Plettl
