= Hinckley and District Hosiery Union =

Former trade union of the United Kingdom

The Hinckley and District Hosiery Union was a trade union representing workers involved in making hosiery in the Hinckley area of Leicestershire, in England.

The Leicester and Leicestershire Amalgamated Hosiery Union was founded in 1885, and attempted to organise throughout the county. However, employers in Hinckley threatened members of the union with the sack, leading them to leave, and workers in the area remained unorganised. Pay and conditions in the Hinckley area became noticeably worse than in Leicester. In 1890, the union made another attempt to organise in the area and, following a nine-week strike, it succeeded, with pay immediately increased by up to 40%.

By 1895, trade had worsened, and pay in Hinckley was cut. The local branch of the union was unhappy with this, and in 1897 it broke away, forming the Hinckley and District Hosiery Union. This initially had 900 members, of which 700 were women. Initially, it was successful at improving conditions, but from 1903 local companies began working together, and membership dropped, bottoming out at 300 in 1910.

Trade unions across the UK recruited well during World War I, and this was very true of the Hinckley union, which grew to 950 members by the end of 1914, and 2,200 four years later. While the industry then began to decline, demand for seamless hose grew, and as Hinckley was famed for this product, employment grew, and membership of the union peaked at 6,000 in 1939. As a non-essential industry, this fell during World War II to 4,000, and the union became interested in a merger with other local hosiery unions. This was achieved at the start of 1945, with the formation of the National Union of Hosiery and Knitwear Workers. Clifford Groocock, the leader of the Hinckley union, was appointed as general secretary of the new union.

== General Secretaries ==
W. Chapman
c.1906: John Bailey
1930: Clifford Groocock
