= NHFA =

NHFA can stand for:

- Nottingham Hosiery Finishers' Association, former British trade union
- Natural Health Foods Association, former name of the Natural Products Association, an organisation of American companies
