= Hitchin Girls' School =

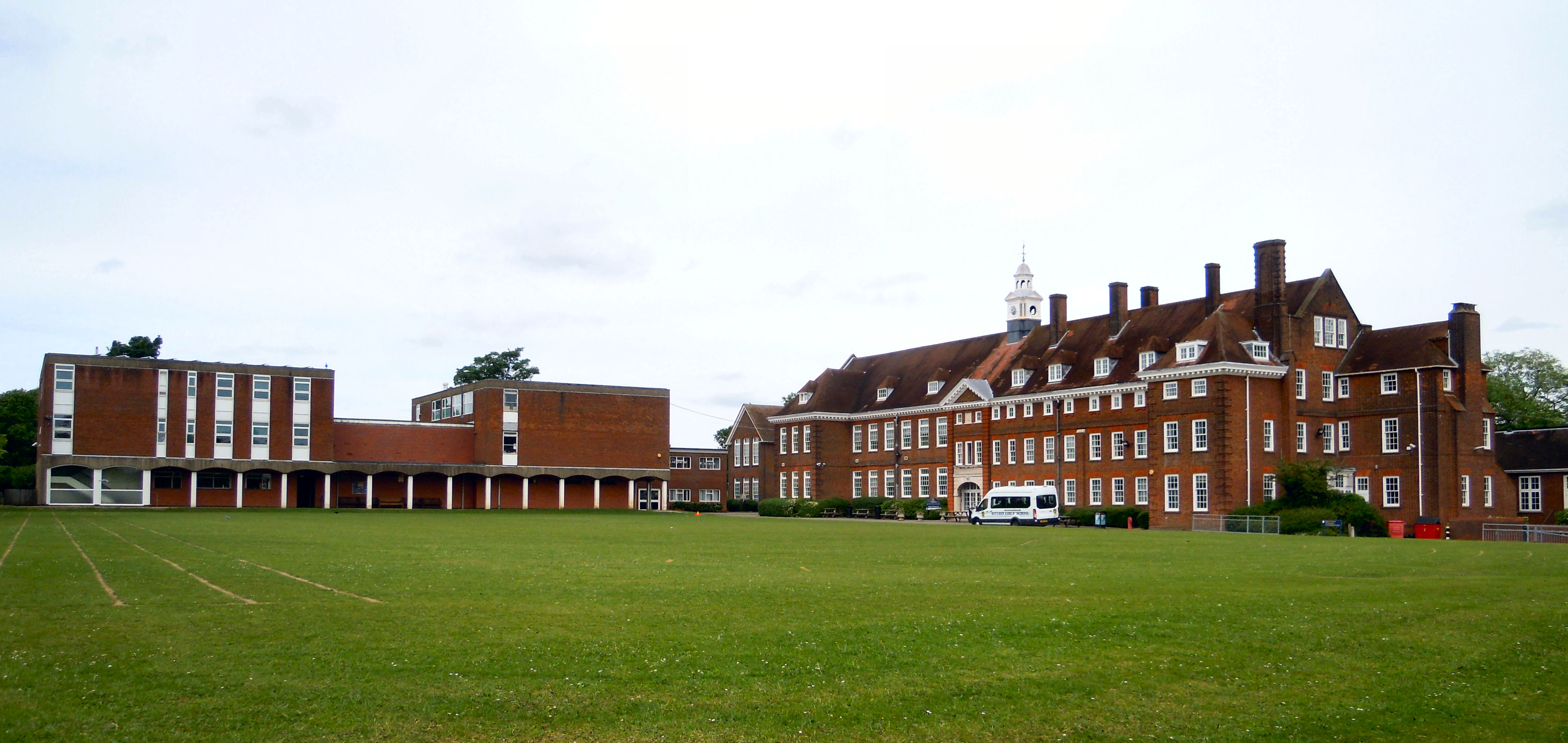

Location
- Highbury Road; Hitchin, Hertfordshire, SG4 9RS; England; 51°56′52″N 0°16′10″W

Information
- Type: Academy
- Established: July 1889
- Founder: John Mattock
- Specialist: Science College
- Department for Education URN: 137288 Tables
- Ofsted: Reports
- Chair: Nesta Job
- Head teacher: James Crowther
- Staff: 75
- Gender: Girls
- Age: 11 to 18
- Enrolment: 1079
- Houses: Austen; Bronte; Curie; Frank; Jewel; Pankhurst; Rosa; Teresa
- Colours: Navy blue and gold
- Website: https://www.hgs.herts.sch.uk

Hitchin Girls' School (HGS) is a secondary school with academy status in Hitchin, Hertfordshire, England. The school has 1079 students and is in a consortium for sixth form teaching with Hitchin Boys' School and The Priory School. It gained academy status in 2011. Its Main Block is the highest building in Hitchin, and upon inspection in 2013 it was given the "outstanding" rating by Ofsted. There are 80 teachers and 1100 students currently on roll.

== History ==
In 1639, John Mattock gave the rents and profits from nine acres of land for "the maintenance of an able and learned schoolmaster for instructing the children of the inhabitants of Hitchin in good literature and virtuous education for the avoiding of idleness, the mother of all vice and wickedness," a quotation which can now be found as a plaque above the school's main entrance.

The original school Mattock founded, Tilehouse Free School, suffered many hardships, including conflict with the locals between Mattock's preferred Classics-based curriculum and a more practical 'three Rs' style of education, substandard teaching and a large amount of debt. This school closed in 1876. It was revived, however, by Frederick Seebohm, a rich and influential Quaker, as a fee-paying mixed school with some scholarships available for the town's poorest inhabitants.

In 1889, this new school was first housed in the "Woodlands" building in Bancroft, Hitchin, owned by Seebohm's business partner Joseph Sharples, but moved in 1906 to its current location on Windmill Hill, also given by the Seebohm family, along with £1,000 towards the building and its maintenance.

Since 1960, there have been no more boarders; the dormitories were converted into the school's library in 1955, which used to be housed in the current staffroom.

It was awarded specialist Science College status in 2004. The head teacher is James Crowther who replaced Frances Manning. Frances Manning replaced Mrs Edwards at the start of the 2007/8 academic year.

In July 2011 it became an academy.

The school's traditions include form running, a relay race which takes place at the end of every term. The first form running competition was held in 1920, and this remains the only state school in the country to maintain this tradition. Gymnastics competitions are held every year, the first of which took place in 1914.

Founders' Day, honouring the original benefactors, has taken place every year since 1932.

Currently, the school has 8 blocks: Main, Lower, Science, Woodside, the Sports Hall, the Sixth Form Centre, and Highbury House, which is shared with North Herts Music School.

== Notable former pupils ==
- Joanna Haigh, physicist and academic
- Catherine Heymans, astrophysicist
- Emma Kennedy, English television actress, writer and presenter
- Pauline Pearce, politician and viral "Heroine of Hackney"
- Eileen Soper, artist
- Claire Tomalin, biographer and Whitbread Book Award winner

== Bibliography ==
- Douglas, Priscilla Mary; Donald, Joyce; Duignan, Elizabeth (1988) The School on the Hill ISBN 9780951372807
