= Horace Moulden =

British trade union leader

Horace Matthew Moulden-Colton (14 July 1898 – 30 April 1988) was a British trade union leader.

Born in Leicester, Moulden left school at the age of thirteen before completing a short apprenticeship in hosiery knitting. He spent four years fighting in World War I, but returned to knitting and became active in the Leicester Hosiery Union. In 1921, he became a collector and workplace leader for the union, and two years later he was elected to its executive.

In 1928, Moulden was elected as secretary of the Leicester Hosiery Union, one of the country's youngest union leaders. As leader, he focused on trying to bring all the various hosiery unions together into one national body. He worked closely in this with Jack Brewin, leader of the Ilkeston and District Hosiery Union.

In 1945, Moulde finally succeeded in persuading the unions to unite, forming the National Union of Hosiery and Knitwear Workers, and was elected as its first General President. In 1960, he was also elected to the executive committee of the International Textile and Garment Workers' Federation. He retired from all his posts in 1963.

He died at a nursing home in Leicester, a few months shy of his 90th birthday.

Trade union offices
Preceded by Jabez Chaplin	General Secretary of the Leicester Hosiery Union; 1928 – 1945; With: George Bailey (1928–1930)	Succeeded by Position abolished
Preceded by New position	General Secretary of the National Union of Hosiery and Knitwear Workers; 1945 – 1963	Succeeded by George Dearing
Preceded by Albert Taylor	Chair of the General Federation of Trade Unions; 1944 – 1946	Succeeded by Frank Dickinson
