= Lady P =

Lady P may refer to:

- Pilar Diaz, lead singer of American alternative rock band Los Abandoned
- Pauline Pearce, jazz singer and subject of the 2011 viral video Heroine of Hackney
