= Jack Charlesworth (trade unionist) =

British trade union leader

John James Charlesworth (30 January 1900 – 9 February 1993) was a British trade union leader.

Born in Basford, Nottingham, Charlesworth left school when he was thirteen, to become an apprentice hosiery trimmer. Within his first year of work, he took part in a lengthy strike, and as a result, was allowed to join the Basford and District Hosiery Trimmers' and Finishers' Society, despite being under the usual age for admission.

Charlesworth was conscripted in 1918, serving in the Staffordshire Regiment. The war was over before he completed training, but he nonetheless served until 1921. He then returned to his trade in Nottingham, to find high unemployment, and these two experiences led him to become a socialist.

In 1921, Charlesworth's union merged into the new Nottingham and District Hosiery Finishers' Association (NHFA), in which he became increasingly active. He also joined the Independent Labour Party, and was soon appointed as joint secretary of its Nottingham branch. He was elected to the executive of the NHFA in 1930, as vice president in 1933, and then president in 1934. He also represented the union to the National Federation of Hosiery Dyers and Finishers, and on the Nottingham and District Trades Council.

Charlesworth joined the Communist Party of Great Britain in 1930, and although he did not keep this a secret, it did not initially impede his trade unionism. In 1940, he was removed from the trades council's executive for his support for the People's Convention, but with the backing of the NHFA was soon reinstated, becoming president of the trades council in 1941 and 1942, then assistant secretary from 1943.

In 1942, Charlesworth was elected as full-time general secretary of the Nottingham and District Hosiery Workers' Society. The union was in a poor financial position, losing members, and faced disputes between its men's and women's sections. Charlesworth managed to almost double membership, to 3,500, and resolve the disputes, but he believed that the various local hosiery unions should merge. In 1945, the union joined the new National Union of Hosiery Workers (NUHW), with Charlesworth becoming its Nottingham District Secretary.

In 1947, Charlesworth was elected as secretary of the NHFA, winning 1,007 votes while the second-placed candidate took only 124. Within four years, he had increased its membership from 1,700 to 2,700, increased its provision of education and recreation, and took the leading role in the Hosiery Finishers' Association. By the late 1960s, he felt that the union was threatened by changes in the trade, and he led its merger into the NUHW, completed in 1969. The union became the Nottingham (Finishers) district of the NUHW, and Charlesworth continued as its secretary until his retirement in 1973, also working as secretary of the Hosiery Finishers' Association.

Charlesworth was elected as secretary of the Nottingham and District Trades Council in 1950, focusing on industrial affairs, peace, and opposition to racism. He also pioneered the "Union Scene" programme on BBC Radio Nottingham. From 1953, he also served on the executive of the Labour Research Department, becoming president in 1955. Charlesworth retired from the trades council in 1970. In 1971, he was awarded the Silver Medal of the General Council of the Trades Union Congress.

Charlesworth retired as president of the Labour Research Department in 1982, but was made honorary president. He remained politically active until shortly before his death, in 1993.

Trade union offices
| Preceded by Will Hartshorn | General Secretary of the Nottingham and District Hosiery Workers' Society; 1942–1945 | Succeeded by Union merged |
| Preceded by ? | General Secretary of the Nottingham Hosiery Finishers' Association; 1947–1969 | Succeeded by Union merged |
| Preceded by Ernest Button? | Secretary of the Nottingham and District Trades Council; 1950–1970 | Succeeded by ? |
