= Clifford Groocock =

British trade union leader

Clifford Groocock Groocock (20 April 1895 – 9 February 1988) was a British trade union leader.

Born as Clifford Groocock Hincks, he was brought up as a Methodist, and from 1917 was a lay preacher. By 1921 he was living in Hinckley in Leicestershire, and working as a hosiery hand. That year, he dropped his surname, and became known as "Clifford Groocock Groocock". He became active in the Hinckley and District Hosiery Union, and in 1930 he was elected as its general secretary.

Under Groocock's leadership, the Hinckley union grew, with membership reaching 6,000 by 1939. However, during World War II this fell back to 4,000 members, and he learned that the Transport and General Workers' Union and the National Union of General and Municipal Workers were proposing to start recruiting hosiery workers in the East Midlands. As a result, he came to support Horace Moulden's proposal that the various local hosiery unions should merge and form a national union.

In 1945, Groocock took his union into the new National Union of Hosiery and Knitwear Workers, and he became its first general secretary. Despite the title, this post was only that of second-in-command, with Moulden as general president being its most prominent figure. Groocock also remained leader of the new union's Hinckley section. Like Moulden, Groocock saw himself as a social democrat, favouring good relationships with employers and minimising industrial action. The union grew as a national force, and Groocock retired in 1960.

Trade union offices
Preceded by John Bailey	General Secretary of the Hinckley and District Hosiery Union; 1930–1944	Succeeded by Position abolished
Preceded by New position	General Secretary of the National Union of Hosiery and Knitwear Workers; 1945–1960	Succeeded by George Dearing
