= Len Childs =

British trade unionist

Leonard F. Childs (1901 – 19 September 1986) was a British trade unionist.

Born in London, Childs began working in a tannery in Bermondsey while still a child. He joined the National Union of Leather Workers and Allied Trades, becoming secretary of its London branch. In 1965, the union's general secretary, H. P. Higginson, retired due to poor health, and Childs was appointed as his successor. He championed a merger of the various unions for workers in the leather industry. A provisional body bringing several unions together was established in 1970, and he acted as its general secretary. The merger was completed in 1971, forming the National Union of the Footwear, Leather and Allied Trades, upon which he retired.

Childs suffered a stroke in 1985, and never fully recovered, dying in 1986.

Trade union offices
Preceded by H. P. Higginson	General Secretary of the National Union of Leather Workers and Allied Trades; 1965–1971	Succeeded by Union merged
