= Helen McGrath =

Scottish trade unionist

Helen Frances McGrath OBE (7 April 1942 – 24 August 2001) was a Scottish trade unionist.

Born in Scotland, McGrath began her career working in administration in Edinburgh. She relocated to England in 1966 and found work with the local co-operative society. In 1969, she moved to work in a factory making knitwear. She joined the National Union of Hosiery and Knitwear Workers (NUHKW) and began working full-time for the union in 1978.

McGrath was elected to the executive of the NUHKW in 1983 and was appointed as its district secretary for Hinckley and the south in 1987. Two years later, she was elected as the union's general secretary, but in 1991, it merged into the National Union of Knitwear, Footwear and Apparel Trades (KFAT), and she became deputy general secretary of the new organisation.

In 1992, McGrath succeeded as general secretary of KFAT, then, in 1994, won the top post of general president. As of 1996, she was one of only five women to lead a Trades Union Congress (TUC) affiliated union. She also won election to the General Council of the TUC and the executive of the International Textile, Garment and Leather Workers' Federation, and in 1993 served on the National Executive Committee of the Labour Party. In 1997, she was a guest of honour at the Women of the Year Lunch. From 1995 until 1998, she served on the executive of the General Federation of Trade Unions.

McGrath was made an Officer of the Order of the British Empire in 1998, and was appointed to the European Economic and Social Committee that year. She stood down from her trade union posts by the following year.

Trade union offices
Preceded by Tom Kirk	General Secretary of the National Union of Hosiery and Knitwear Workers; 1989–1990	Succeeded by Position abolished
Preceded by George Browett	General Secretary of the National Union of Knitwear, Footwear and Apparel Trades; 1992–1994	Succeeded by Paul Gates
Preceded by David Lambert	General President of the National Union of Knitwear, Footwear and Apparel Trades; 1994–1999	Succeeded by Tony Hallam
