= George Dearing =

British trade union leader

George Edmund Dearing (30 December 1911 – 23 February 1968) was a British trade union leader.

Dearing came to prominence in 1945 as the Leicester District Secretary of the newly formed National Union of Hosiery and Knitwear Workers (NUHKW). In 1958, he was appointed as the union's Assistant General Secretary, then in 1960 became its General Secretary. In 1963, he was elected as General President, the most senior post in the union.

Dearing also represented his union on the management committee of the General Federation of Trade Unions, and the executive committee of the International Textile and Garment Workers' Federation.

In his spare time, Dearing chaired the East Midlands Economic Planning Council from 1965, and also served on the Consultative Council of the East Midlands Gas Board. He was active in the Labour Party, and was an Urban District Councillor for Hinckley until he stood down in 1967. He served as chairman in 1958.

Dearing received a number of accolades; he was made a Member of the Order of the British Empire in 1950, and a Commander in 1966, and was given an honorary master's degree by the University of Leicester in 1967.

He was married to Vera Foster and they had two children, a boy and a girl. Dearing died suddenly in February 1968, while at a business meeting in Nottingham.

Trade union offices
Preceded by Clifford Groocock	General Secretary of the National Union of Hosiery and Knitwear Workers; 1960 – 1963	Succeeded by Harold Gibson
Preceded by Horace Moulden	General President of the National Union of Hosiery and Knitwear Workers; 1963 – 1968	Succeeded by Peter Pendergast
