= Bob Stevenson (trade unionist) =

British trade unionist

Robert Bryce Stevenson (26 June 1926 – 2 July 2003) was a British trade unionist.

Born near Airdrie in Lanarkshire, Stevenson was educated at Caldercruix Advanced School before joining the British Army. During World War II, he served with the Queen's Own Cameron Highlanders. In 1947, he left the Army and settled in Shepton Mallet, finding work with Clarks Shoes and joining the National Union of Boot and Shoe Operatives (NUBSO).

In 1951, Stevenson was elected as president of his local branch of NUBSO, and ten years later he began working full-time for the union, based in Street. He remained in this post as the union became part of the National Union of Footwear, Leather and Allied Trades (NUFLAT). In 1980, he was elected as NUFLAT's General President.

As leader of NUBSO, Stevenson focused on a campaign to reduce the length of the working week, and for European Economic Community policy to support British shoemaking. Stevenson represented the union the Trades Union Congress (TUC), and served on the General Council of the TUC from 1984. He promoted education among trade union members, and served on the council of Ruskin College.

Faced with declining membership, Stevenson negotiated a merger between NUFLAT and the National Union of Hosiery and Knitwear Workers which formed the National Union of Knitwear, Footwear and Apparel Trades; he retired at the end of 1990, as the merger was effected. In retirement, he continued to serve on the board of the Footwear Benevolent Society until 2002.

Trade union offices
Preceded by Bert Comerford	General President of the National Union of Footwear, Leather and Allied Trades; 1980 – 1990	Succeeded by Position abolished
