= International Clothing Workers' Federation =

Former global union federation (1893–1960)

The International Clothing Workers' Federation (IGWF) was a global union federation representing workers involved in making and repairing clothes.

== History ==
The federation was established in 1893 at a conference in Zürich. The following year, it established headquarters in Berlin, moving to Amsterdam in 1920. It held conferences in different European locations every three to four years. In 1925, the International Furriers' Secretariat merged into the organisation, giving the organisation 29 affiliates with a total of 315,000 members.

The federation ceased to operate during World War II, but was re-established in 1946, based in London. In 1949, it was refounded as the International Garment Workers' Federation, which in 1960 merged with the International Federation of Textile Workers' Associations to form the International Textile and Garment Workers' Federation.

== Affiliates ==
In 1954, the following unions were affiliated to the federation:

Union	Country	Affiliated membership
Amalgamated Clothing Workers of America	United States	282,212
Clothing and Hat Federation	France	5,000
Danish Clothing Workers' Union	Denmark	22,204
Danish Hatters' and Furriers' Union	Denmark	Unknown
Felt Hatters', Trimmers' and Allied Workers' Unions	United Kingdom	5,487
General Industrial Union of Textiles and Clothing	Netherlands	4,500
International Ladies' Garment Workers' Union	United States	368,000
National Union of Hosiery Workers	United Kingdom	40,539
National Union of Tailors and Garment Workers	United Kingdom	120,417
Norwegian Union of Clothing Workers	Norway	15,500
Swedish Clothing Workers' Union	Sweden	32,167
Swiss Clothing, Leather and Equipment Workers' Union	Switzerland	3,360
Tailor, Tent, Sailmaker and Garment Workers' Union	Kenya	1,250
Textile and Clothing Union	West Germany	75,000
Union of Clothing Workers	Finland	5,000
Union of Clothing Workers and Kindred Trades in Belgium	Belgium	9,500
Union of Shop, Distributive and Allied Workers	United Kingdom	15,000
Union of Textile and Clothing Workers	Luxembourg	333
Union of Textile, Clothing and Leather Workers	Austria	4,000
United Hatters, Cap and Millinery Workers International Union (UHCMW)	United States	32,000
United Italian Federation of Clothing Workers	Italy	53,000

== Leadership ==
=== General Secretaries ===
1894: Clara Zetkin
1900: Heinrich Stühmer
1920: Tonnis van der Heeg
1946: Andrew Conley
1949: Ian Milner
1956: John Newton

=== Presidents ===
1910s: William P. Arup
1920: Martin Plettl
1933: Josef Andersson
as of 1957: Per Petterson
