= Karl Buschmann =

German trade union leader

Karl Buschmann (12 August 1914 – 16 February 1988) was a German trade union leader.

Born in Brake, near Bielefeld, Buschmann left school at the age of fourteen and undertook an apprenticeship as a bricklayer, also joining a trade union. He later worked in the metal and textile industries. In 1945, he was one of the first to organise trade unions in the textile trade, working full-time as an organiser from 1947. The union became part of the Textile and Clothing Union (GTB), and in 1951, he was elected to its executive committee.

Buschmann was elected as president of the union in 1963, and became known for his focus on the likely effects of globalisation on social and working conditions worldwide. This led him to prominence in the International Textile, Garment and Leather Workers' Federation, and in 1972, he was elected as its president.

From 1968 onwards, the textile industry in West Germany was in sharp decline, with more than 1,000 factories closing and 300,000 jobs lost over the following ten years. Unemployment grew, with 96% of unemployed textile workers being women. He stood down as leader of the GTB in 1978, and from his international post in 1980.

Trade union offices
Preceded by Werner Bock	President of the Textile and Clothing Union; 1963–1978	Succeeded by Berthold Keller
Preceded by John Newton	President of the International Textile, Garment and Leather Workers' Federation; 1972–1980	Succeeded by Harold Gibson
