= Harold Gibson =

British trade union leader

Harold Leslie George Gibson OBE (15 July 1917 – 11 January 1994) was a British trade union leader.

Born in Liverpool, Gibson worked as a plumber until 1949, when he moved to Leicester to become the full-time northern district secretary for the National Union of Hosiery and Knitwear Workers (NUHKW). In 1962, he was elected as general secretary of the union, then in 1975 to the top post of general president.

Gibson held a wide variety of posts in the broader trade union movement, including sitting on the management committee of the General Federation of Trade Unions and serving as its chair in 1974, serving on the Trades Union Congress' Textile Committee, the executive of the British Textile Confederation, and as president of the International Textile, Garment and Leather Workers' Federation.

Gibson retired in 1982, and was awarded an honorary degree by the University of Leicester. He was made a Member of the Order of the British Empire in 1971, and an Officer in 1978.

Trade union offices
Preceded by George Dearing	General Secretary of the National Union of Hosiery and Knitwear Workers; 1963–1975	Succeeded by David Lambert
Preceded by Peter Pendergast	General President of the National Union of Hosiery and Knitwear Workers; 1975–1982	Succeeded by David Lambert
Preceded by Edward Tullock	Chair of the General Federation of Trade Unions; 1974–1975	Succeeded by Tom Whittaker
Preceded by Karl Buschmann	President of the International Textile, Garment and Leather Workers' Federation; 1980–1984	Succeeded by Karl-Erik Persson
