= Martin Plettl =

German trade union leader

Martin Plettl (29 September 1881 – 10 September 1963) was a German trade union leader.

Born in Garham, in Lower Bavaria, Plettl completed an apprenticeship as a ladies' tailor. He joined the German Clothing Workers' Union, and in 1905 became the full-time manager of its Frankfurt district, also chairing the district from 1908. From 1912, he was instead chair of the union's South West German district.

Plettl joined the Social Democratic Party of Germany, and in 1916, he won a seat on the municipal council in Frankfurt. In 1920, he was elected as president of the union, and also became president of the International Clothing Workers' Federation.

In 1933, the unions were banned by the Nazis, and Plettl was arrested and imprisoned, being moved to Spandau Prison after a few weeks. He was released later in the year, and fled to the Netherlands, then on to the United States. There, he formed the German League for Freedom Abroad, and served on the German Labor Delegation.

Plettl remained in the United States after World War II, and died in Florida, in 1963.

Trade union offices
Preceded by Heinrich Stühmer	President of the German Clothing Workers' Union; 1920–1933	Succeeded by Union banned
Preceded by William P. Arup	President of the International Clothing Workers' Federation; 1920–1933	Succeeded by Josef Andersson
