= Ilkeston and District Hosiery Union =

Former trade union of the United Kingdom

The Ilkeston and District Hosiery Union was a trade union representing people involved in making hosiery in northern Nottinghamshire and eastern Derbyshire, in England.

The union was founded in 1888 as the Ilkeston Hosiery Union, but it almost immediately opened branches in Mansfield and Sutton-in-Ashfield and so renamed itself as the Ilkeston and District Hosiery Union. The union was a founder member of the Midland Counties Hosiery Federation, in which it worked with the Leicester and Leicestershire Amalgamated Hosiery Union and the Nottingham United Rotary Power Framework Knitters' Society.

In the 1880s and 1890s, a growing number of hosiery workers were women, but the Ilkeston union remained dominated by men; by 1910, only 72 out of 642 members were women. This changed during World War I; for example, in 1915, 700 women in one factory in Heanor joined, and by March 1919, the union had 6,040 members, most of whom were women. The union also expanded its area, with branches as far afield as Ambergate and Buxton, and admitted administrative and supervisory staff.

The union's membership peaked at 7,600 in 1921, but then fell to only 3,000 by 1933. It grew back to 4,000 members by 1939, but dropped to 3,500 during World War II. At the start of 1945, it merged with other local hosiery unions, to form the National Union of Hosiery and Knitwear Workers.

== General Secretaries ==
1890s: Harry Bassford
1928: Jack Brewin
