= Joanna Haigh =

British physicist (born 1954)

Joanna Haigh CBE FRS FInstP FRMetS
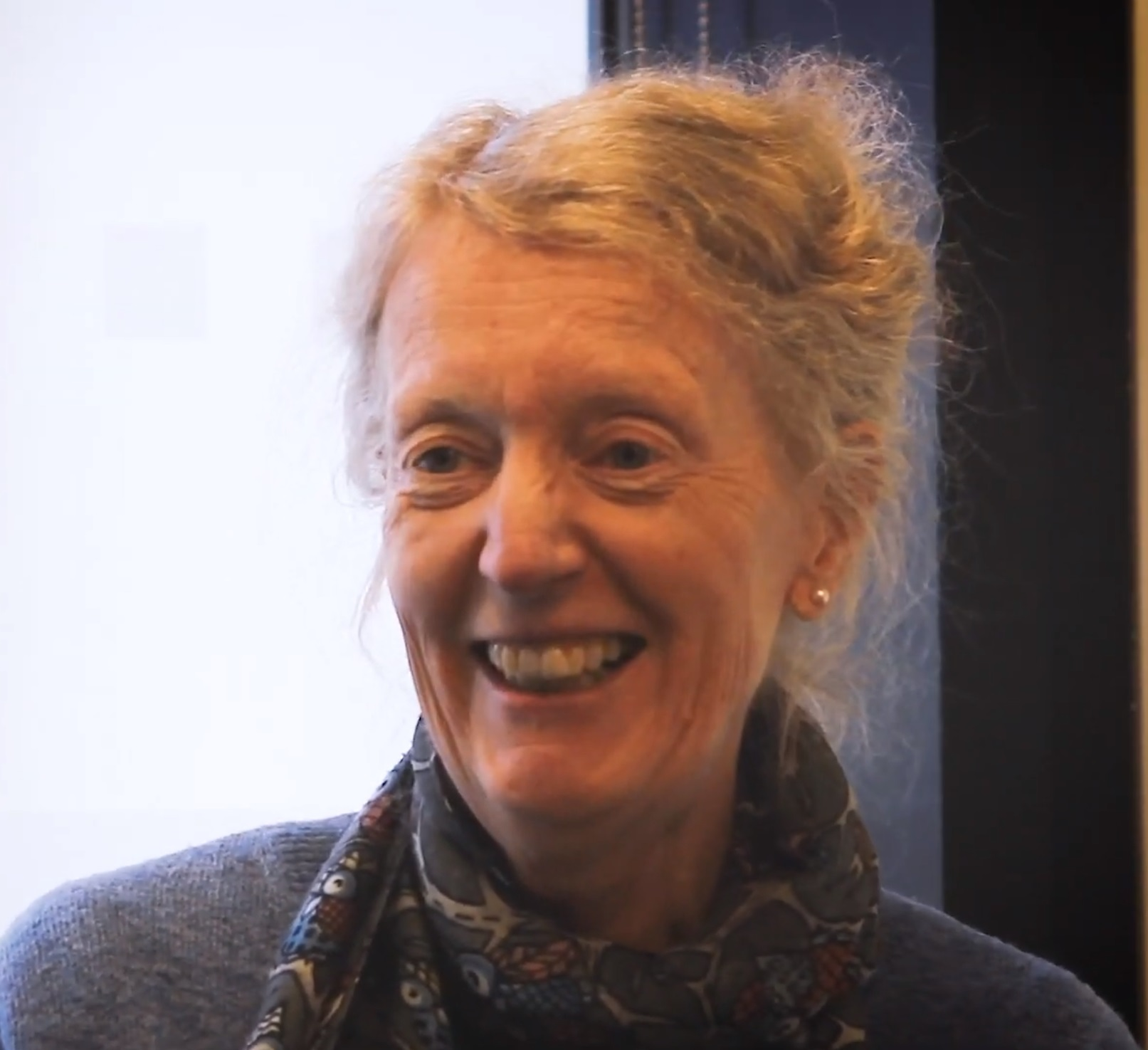
- Haigh in 2019
- Born: Joanna Dorothy Haigh; 7 May 1954 (age 72)
- Education: Hitchin Girls' School; University of Oxford (MA, DPhil); Imperial College London (MSc, DPhil)
- Known for: Work on solar variability
- Awards: Chree Medal (2004)
- Scientific career
- Fields: Atmospheric physics
- Workplaces: Imperial College London; University of Oxford
- Thesis: Experiments with a two-dimensional model of the general circulation (1980)
- Doctoral advisor: C.D. Walshaw
- Notable students: Alice Larkin
- Joanna Haigh's voice from the BBC programme The Life Scientific, 27 August 2013.
- Website: www.imperial.ac.uk/people/j.haigh

Joanna Dorothy Haigh (born 7 May 1954) is a British physicist and academic. Before her retirement in 2019 she was Professor of Atmospheric Physics at Imperial College London, and co-director of the Grantham Institute – Climate Change and Environment. She served as head of the Department of Physics at Imperial College London. She is a Fellow of the Royal Society (FRS), and served as president of the Royal Meteorological Society.

== Early life and education ==
Haigh was born in 1954. She was educated at Hitchin Girls' School, then an all-girls grammar school in Hitchin, Hertfordshire. She showed an early interest in the weather, building her own weather station in her back garden as a teenager. She studied physics at Somerville College, Oxford, graduating with a Bachelor of Arts (BA) degree; as per tradition, this was later promoted to a Master of Arts (Oxon) degree. This was followed by a Master of Science (MSc) degree in meteorology at Imperial College London. She returned to Oxford to complete a Doctor of Philosophy (DPhil) degree in atmospheric physics under the supervision of C.D. Walshaw. This was awarded in 1980 for her doctoral thesis on Experiments with a two-dimensional model of the general circulation.

== Career and research ==
Haigh is Emeritus Professor of atmospheric physics at Imperial College London. She joined Imperial College London as a lecturer in 1984. Since 2014, she has served as co-director of the Grantham Institute – Climate Change and Environment. She has served as head of the Department of Physics at Imperial College from 2009 to 2014.

Haigh is known for her work on solar variability, and also works on radiative transfer, stratosphere-troposphere coupling and climate modelling. She has served as editor of the Journal of the Atmospheric Sciences and a lead author on the Third Assessment Report of the Intergovernmental Panel on Climate Change.

=== Views on climate change ===
Haigh conforms to the mainstream scientific view, that anthropogenic carbon emissions lead to increased greenhouse warming. She stated in June 2016 that if current levels of carbon dioxide emissions continued unabated, they would lead to a 5 °C increase over pre-industrial climate by the end of the next century, and that achieving a zero temperature rise would require a complete cessation of carbon emissions. She also stated that she was optimistic about the future, following the COP21 conference, but later, when Donald Trump became president of the United States, she said:

"If Trump does what he said he'd do, and others follow suit, my gut feeling is that I'm scared. Very scared."

=== Awards and honours ===
In the 2013 New Year Honours, Haigh was appointed a Commander of the Order of the British Empire (CBE) "for services to physics". Haigh served as president of the Royal Meteorological Society from 2012 to 2014; she is now a vice-president. In 2013, she was elected a Fellow of the Royal Society (FRS). Her nomination read:

Distinguished for her scientific leadership in the area of solar influences on the middle atmosphere and for her modelling of how these effects can modulate tropospheric circulations and so propagate to Earth's surface. Her expertise in modelling atmospheric radiative transfer allowed the development of computationally fast but accurate radiative transfer schemes some of which are now in use by climate modelling groups across the world. By proposing and demonstrating an entirely novel mechanism for solar influence on climate she has allowed proper allowance to be made for the small and subtle, yet revealing effects.

In 2004 she received the Charles Chree Medal and Prize from the Institute of Physics and in 2010 the Royal Meteorological Society Adrian Gill prize for her work on solar variability and its effects on climate.

In November 2020 she was included in the BBC Radio 4 Woman's Hour Power list 2020. She was interviewed by Jim Al-Khalili for The Life Scientific in 2013.

Haigh is a Fellow of the Institute of Physics (FInstP).
