= James Stott (trade unionist) =

British trade unionist (1884–1957)

James Stott (6 September 1884 – 18 April 1957) was a British trade union leader, who became secretary of the International Federation of Textile Workers.

Stott worked in the cotton industry in Bury, and he became active in his trade union, the Amalgamated Association of Beamers, Twisters and Drawers, becoming its assistant general secretary by 1930. The Beamers were affiliated to the United Textile Factory Workers' Association (UTFWA), and this organisation sponsored him as a Labour Party in Heywood and Radcliffe at the 1931 UK general election. The Manchester Guardian described him as a "powerful free trade candidate", but he was not elected.

William C. Robinson, secretary of the Beamers, died in 1931, and Stott was elected as his successor. In 1934, he persuaded the UTFWA to adopt a new policy of support for the socialisation of the Lancashire cotton industry, and in 1935, he used this backing to gain the support of the Trades Union Congress. His increased profile led him to win election as vice president of the UTFWA, and also to the management committee of the General Federation of Trade Unions.

By 1939, Stott was eager to obtain a higher level role in trade unionism. The post of general secretary of the International Federation of Textile Workers' Associations became available, and he won the role. World War II broke out, and so the role remained low profile until it was over. He then led the reconstruction of the federation, bringing together the various surviving or re-established unions of textile workers.

Stott retired in 1949, and suffered poor health for several years before his death, in 1957.

Trade union offices
Preceded by William C. Robinson	General Secretary of the Amalgamated Association of Beamers, Twisters and Drawers; 1932–1939	Succeeded by Harry Earnshaw
Preceded by Edward Duxbury	Vice President of the United Textile Factory Workers' Association; 1935–1939	Succeeded by Cameron Doodson
Preceded by Arthur Shaw	General Secretary of the International Federation of Textile Workers' Associations; 1939–1949	Succeeded by Jack Greenhalgh
