= National Union of Glovers and Leatherworkers =

Former trade union of the United Kingdom

NUGLW
- National Union of Glovers and Leatherworkers
- Merged into: National Union of Footwear, Leather and Allied Trades
- Founded: 1920
- Dissolved: 1971
- Headquarters: Yeovil, Somerset
- Location: United Kingdom

The National Union of Glovers and Leatherworkers (NUGLW) was a trade union in the United Kingdom which existed between 1920 and 1971. It represented workers in the glove-making and leather industry.

== History ==
The union was formed in 1920 by the merger of the Amalgamated Society of Glovers and the United Glovers' Mutual Aid Society as the National Union of Glovers (NUG). The union was based primarily in Yeovil and the surrounding areas, a major centre for the glove-making industry in Britain. In 1919 the NUG rejected a proposal from the National Union of Boot and Shoe Operatives (NUBSO) to amalgamate, on the basis that the NUG's status as the majority union on the Glove Manufacturing Joint Industrial Council (JIC) gave it a strong bargaining position with employers. In 1954 the union changed its name to include workers in the leather industry. In 1971 the NUGLW merged with the Amalgamated Society of Leather Workers, NUBSO and the National Union of Leather Workers and Allied Trades to form the National Union of Footwear, Leather and Allied Trades (NUFLAT).

== General Secretaries ==
1920: A. H. J. Stroud
1945: E. C. G. Fear
