= International Federation of Textile Workers' Associations =

Former global union federation (1893–1960)

The International Federation of Textile Workers' Association (IFTWA) was a global union federation bringing together unions of textile workers, principally in Europe.

== History ==
The federation's origins lay in the International Textile Congress, held in Manchester, in England, in 1894. The congress was organised on the initiative of James Mawdsley and David Holmes, and of the 179,000 workers represented, 150,000 were covered by the British unions. Other representatives came from Austria, Belgium, Denmark, France, the Netherlands, and the United States. The European delegates pushed a more socialist approach, focusing on political action. The congress agreed to establish an international organisation, and to campaign for a maximum eight-hour working day.

For the first few years, the federation did little beyond organise further conferences. The European delegates argued unsuccessfully for the creation of an international strike fund, and successfully for the appointment of a general secretary to organise action. William Marsland was appointed in 1905, and initially proved successful, learning French and publishing a quarterly newsletter. However, his decision to publish an obituary for Edward VII proved highly controversial, and he stood down, to be replaced by Tom Shaw.

The organisation became inactive during World War I, but was re-established in 1920, and affiliated to the International Federation of Trade Unions. Reductions in the working week were achieved over the next few years, and the federation agreed to establish a full-time secretariat, to be based in Manchester. James Bell was appointed as general secretary, but after a year was replaced by Shaw. Shaw was in government between 1929 and 1931, but continued on an unpaid basis, and then resumed the full-time position.

Under Shaw's leadership, the federation investigated working conditions in India and China, and made some limited efforts to encourage trade unionism in India. An international 40-hour working week was agreed by the International Labour Organization, but never enacted, due to the outbreak of World War II. After the war, James Stott led successful efforts to reconstruct the federation.

In 1960, the federation merged with the International Garment Workers' Federation, forming the International Textile and Garment Workers' Federation.

== Affiliates ==
In 1954, the following unions were affiliated to the federation:

Union	Country	Affiliated membership
All India Federation of Textile Unions	India	90,000
Danish Textile Workers' Union	Denmark	26,299
General Industrial Union of Textiles and Clothing	Netherlands	10,110
Italian Federation of Textile Workers	Italy	200,000
Italian Union of Textile Workers	Italy	20,000
Japan Federation of Textile Workers' Unions	Japan	200,000
National Federation of Textiles	France	18,000
National Union of Dyers, Bleachers and Textile Workers	United Kingdom	74,000
Norwegian Union of Textile Workers	Norway	11,879
Pakistan Textile Workers' Federation	Pakistan	20,000
Swedish Textile Workers' Union	Sweden	44,239
Textile and Clothing Union	West Germany	275,000
Textile and Knitting Workers' Union	Finland	6,000
Textile Workers Union of America	United States	264,000
Union of Belgian Textile Workers	Belgium	65,190
Union of Textile, Clothing and Leather Workers	Austria	65,000
Union of Textile and Factory Workers	Switzerland	12,000
United Textile Factory Workers' Association	United Kingdom	172,770

== General Secretaries ==
1893: James Mawdsley
1895: Ferdinand Hardijns
1897: William Henry Wilkinson
1905: William Marsland
1911: Tom Shaw
1924: James Bell
1925: Tom Shaw
1938: Arthur Shaw (acting)
1939: James Stott
1949: Jack Greenhalgh
