= Heinrich Stühmer =

German trade unionist (1863–1945)

Heinrich Stühmer (14 January 1863 – October 1945) was a German trade unionist.

Born in Bünzen, near Aukrug, Stühmer was orphaned at an early age. He excelled at school and hoped to become a teacher, but could not fund the training. He eventually found a paid apprenticeship as a tailor, and in 1887 joined the Travel Support Association of German Tailors. At the time, the Anti-Socialist Laws made trade unions illegal, but the Travel Support Association fulfilled some of the same role. Stühmer was drawn to the potential of trade unions to improve pay and working conditions, and in 1888 he moved to Hamburg, then the centre of the German labour movement.

In 1888, the German Union of Tailors was formed, and Stühmer was appointed as its secretary, then soon moved to become its Hamburg branch representative. In 1891, he began editing the union's newspaper, becoming the first employee of the union. He championed the formation of the International Clothing Workers' Federation, and served as its first president, and then as secretary from 1900. In 1903, he was elected as the union's president, relocating to the union's new headquarters in Berlin.

The international became moribund at the start of World War I, but Stühmer remained leader of the tailors, in what became the German Clothing Workers' Union. At the end of the war, the international was re-established, and Stühmer was elected to its board. He stood down as union leader in 1920, but served on the Reich Economic Council, and wrote a history of the German clothing movement, covering 1888 until 1928. He then retired, but he remained on the executive of the Clothing Workers' Union in an unpaid capacity.

Stühmer survived World War II, but died in October 1945, while living in the Soviet zone of Berlin.

Trade union offices
Preceded by Clara Zetkin	General Secretary of the International Clothing Workers' Federation; 1900–1914	Succeeded by Tonnis van der Heeg
Preceded by Friedrich Holzhäußer	President of the German Clothing Workers' Union; 1903–1920	Succeeded by Martin Plettl
