= Amalgamated Society of Leather Workers =

Former trade union of the United Kingdom

- Merged into: National Union of Footwear, Leather and Allied Trades
- Founded: 1872; 154 years ago
- Dissolved: 1971; 55 years ago
- Headquarters: 4 Mexborough Avenue, Leeds
- Location: United Kingdom
- Members: 12,099 (1954)
- Affiliations: TUC

The Amalgamated Society of Leather Workers was a trade union representing tanners and workers involved in making leather goods in the United Kingdom.

The union was founded in 1872 as the Leeds and District United Tanners' Society. Before the end of the century, it merged with the Leather Finishers' Society, Pickermakers' Society and United Grounders' Society, and in 1892 it changed its name to the Amalgamated Society of Tanners. In 1897, in an attempt to broaden its remit, it renamed itself as the Amalgamated Society of Tanners, Lacecutters and Beltmakers, and then in the 1900s adopted its final name.

The union long remained small, having 780 members in 1910. However, from 1912 it was led by a full-time general secretary, and it began to grow, reaching 12,099 members by 1954.

In 1971, the union merged with the National Union of Boot and Shoe Operatives, National Union of Glovers and Leather Workers and National Union of Leather Workers and Allied Trades, forming the National Union of Footwear, Leather and Allied Trades.

== General Secretaries ==
Robert Siddle
c.1919: Frederick Charles Langton
1948: A. L. Barrett
