= Berthold Keller =

German trade union leader (1927–2012)

Berthold Keller (8 February 1927 – 28 June 2012) was a German trade union leader.

Born in Konstanz, Keller completed an apprenticeship as a tailor, and found work in a local clothing factory. In 1944, he was called up to the army, but was taken as a prisoner-of-war in France in March 1945, and was only released in 1949.

Keller returned to tailoring, an in 1952 became involved in the Textile and Clothing Union (GTB), working full-time for the union from 1955. He spent ten years working as executive secretary to the union's president, Karl Buschmann, then in 1972 was elected to the union's executive in his own right. In 1978, Buschmann stood down, and Keller easily won the election to succeed him.

As leader of the union, Keller was known as a pragmatist, avoiding industrial action. The textile industry was in rapid decline, 200,000 jobs being lost from 1978 to 1990, and union membership also decreased. Despite this, he became prominent internationally, and was elected as president of the International Textile, Garment and Leather Workers' Federation in 1988.

Keller stood down as president of the GTB in 1990, and took a textile industry position, attempting to preserve the remainder of the industry, achieving a reorganisation and formation of a new trust company, with state support. He retired in 1992, when this work was completed.

Trade union offices
Preceded by Karl Buschmann	President of the Textile and Clothing Union; 1978–1990	Succeeded by Willi Arens
Preceded by Karl-Erik Persson	President of the International Textile, Garment and Leather Workers' Federation; 1988–1992	Succeeded by David Lambert
