= William Henry Wilkinson (trade unionist) =

William Henry Wilkinson (1850 – 25 April 1906) was a British trade unionist.

Born in Haslingden, Wilkinson became a cotton weaver in 1864. He was a founder member of the Haslingden Weavers' Association, and was appointed as its general secretary in 1879. At the time, the Blackburn Weavers' Association were on strike, opposing wage reductions of 10%. Realising that, if the Blackburn Weavers lost, the cuts would be likely to be applied in Haslingden too, Wilkinson raised large sums - around £140 per week - to support the Blackburn Weavers. Thanks to this, the strike was won, and Wilkinson came to prominence in textile trade unionism.

The secretaryship was a part-time post, and Wilkinson continued to work as a weaver and, occasionally, as an overlooker, until 1880 when he became clerk of the North East Lancashire Amalgamated Weavers' Association. Its secretary, Thomas Birtwistle, founded the broader Northern Counties Amalgamated Association of Weavers, and in 1885, Wilkinson became secretary of this Second Amalgamation.

Wilkinson undertook various other roles, including membership of the executive of the Labour Representation Committee, and serving as secretary of the International Association of Textile Workers. He continued as secretary of the Haslingden Weavers until 1904. His health then worsened, and he stood down from the International Association at its conference in 1906, then took leave of absence from his remaining posts, dying soon after.

Trade union offices
| Preceded by ? | General Secretary of the Haslingden Weavers' Association; 1879–1904 | Succeeded by George Whittam |
| Preceded by Thomas Birtwistle | General Secretary of the Northern Counties Amalgamated Association of Weavers; 1885–1906 | Succeeded by Joseph Cross |
| Preceded by Thomas Ashton and Fred Hammill | Auditor of the Trades Union Congress; 1895–1904; With: William Parrott (1895–1896); William Matkin (1897); William Parrott (1898–1902); John Wadsworth (1903–1904) | Succeeded by Joe Williams and John Wadsworth |
| Preceded by Ferdinand Hardijns | General Secretary of the International Federation of Textile Workers; 1897–1905 | Succeeded by William Marsland |
