= Nottingham and District Hosiery Workers' Society =

Former trade union of the United Kingdom

The Nottingham and District Hosiery Workers' Society was a trade union representing machine knitters in and around Nottingham, in England.

The union was founded in 1925, when the Nottingham United Rotary Power Framework Knitters' Society merged with the Nottingham Circular Framework Knitters' Society, and the Nottingham Female Hosiery Workers' Union. The new union had 5,013 members, significantly more than any of the predecessor unions, but this began to fall in the 1930s, dropping to only 1,666 by 1942.

In 1942, the union's general secretary, William Hartshorn, died, and the union was unable to agree on a replacement from any internal candidates. Eventually, Jack Charlesworth, president of the Nottingham and District Hosiery Finishers' Association, was appointed. He was able to almost double membership, to 3,500, and resolve serious disputes between the men's and women's sections.

The difficulties experienced led the union to support a merger with other hosiery unions, which at the start of 1945 formed the National Union of Hosiery Workers (NUHW). The Nottingham union became the Nottingham District of the NUHW.

== General Secretaries ==
1925: Will Hartshorn
1942: Jack Charlesworth
