= Claire Tomalin =

English biographer and journalist (born 1933)

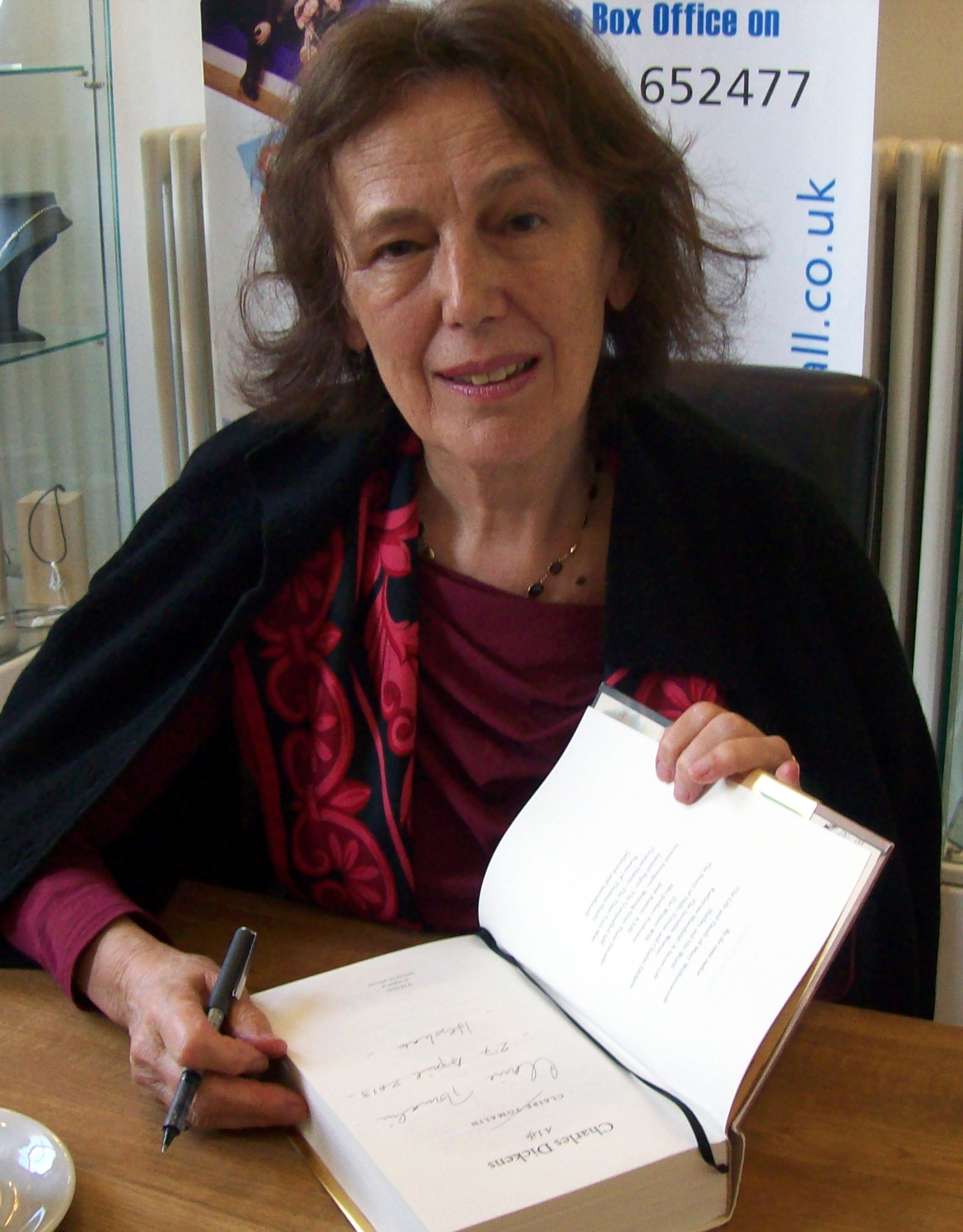
- Tomalin, 2013
- Born: Claire Delavenay; 20 June 1933 (age 93) London, England
- Occupation: Author, journalist
- Education: Hitchin Girls' School; Dartington Hall School
- Alma mater: Newnham College, Cambridge
- Notable works: The Invisible Woman: The story of Nelly Ternan and Charles Dickens (1990): Samuel Pepys: The Unequalled Self (2002)
- Spouse: Nicholas Tomalin (m. 1955; died 1973) Michael Frayn (m. 1993)
- Children: 5

Claire Tomalin (née Delavenay; born 20 June 1933) is an English journalist and biographer known for her biographies of Charles Dickens, Thomas Hardy, Samuel Pepys, Jane Austen and Mary Wollstonecraft.

== Early life ==
Tomalin was born Claire Delavenay on 20 June 1933 in London, the daughter of English composer Muriel Herbert and French academic Émile Delavenay.

== Education ==
Tomalin was educated at Hitchin Girls' Grammar School, a former state grammar school in Hitchin in Hertfordshire, at Dartington Hall School, a former boarding-school in Devon, and at Newnham College, Cambridge.

== Career ==
- In 1974 Tomalin published her first book The Life and Death of Mary Wollstonecraft, which won the Whitbread Book Award.

Since then she has published:

- Shelley and His World (1980)
- Katherine Mansfield: A Secret Life (1987)
- The Invisible Woman: The Story of Nelly Ternan and Charles Dickens (1990) NCR Book Award, Hawthornden, James Tait Black Prize. Now a film
- Mrs Jordan's Profession (1994)
- Jane Austen: A Life (1997)
- Samuel Pepys: The Unequalled Self (2002) Whitbread biography and Book of the Year prizes, Pepys Society Prize, Rose Mary Crawshay Prize
- Thomas Hardy: The Time-Torn Man (2006), followed by a television film about Hardy, and published a collection of Hardy's poems.
- Charles Dickens: A Life (2011)
- The Young H. G. Wells: Changing the World (2021)
- She also edited and introduced Mary Shelley's story for children, Maurice. A collection of her reviews, Several Strangers, appeared in 1999.

Tomalin organised two exhibitions about the Regency actress Mrs Jordan at Kenwood House in 1995, and about Mary Wollstonecraft and Mary Shelley in 1997. In 2004 she unveiled a blue plaque for Mary Wollstonecraft at 45 Dolben Street, Southwark, where Wollstonecraft lived from 1788. She has served on the committee of the London Library, and as a trustee of the National Portrait Gallery and the Wordsworth Trust. She is a vice-president of the Royal Literary Fund, the Royal Society of Literature and of English PEN. She is also a member of the American Philosophical Society.

== Personal life ==
Tomalin married her first husband, fellow Cambridge graduate Nicholas Tomalin, a journalist, in 1955, and they had three daughters and two sons. He was killed while reporting on the Yom Kippur War in 1973. She worked in publishing and journalism as literary editor of the New Statesman, then The Sunday Times, while bringing up her children. She married the novelist and playwright Michael Frayn in 1993. They live in Petersham, London.

== Awards and honours ==
- Fellow of the Royal Society of Literature (1976)
- James Tait Black Memorial Prize, The Invisible Woman (1990)
- Hawthornden Prize, The Invisible Woman (1991)
- Whitbread Book Award, Samuel Pepys: The Unequalled Self (2002)
- Rose Mary Crawshay Prize, Samuel Pepys: The Unequalled Self (2003)
- Samuel Pepys Award of the Samuel Pepys Club, Samuel Pepys: The Unequalled Self (2003)
- Samuel Johnson Prize, shortlist, Samuel Pepys: The Unequalled Self (2003)
- Honorary Member Magdalene College, Cambridge (2003)
- Honorary Fellow Lucy Cavendish College, Cambridge (2003), Newnham College; Cambridge (2004)
- Honorary D.Litt: UEA (2005); Birmingham (2005); Greenwich (2006); Cambridge (2007); Goldsmith (2009); Open University (2008); Roehampton (2011); Portsmouth (2012)
- Costa Book Awards (Biography), shortlist, Charles Dickens: A Life (2011)
- Biographers International Organization Annual Award (2016)
- Bodley Medal (2018)

== Works ==
- The Young H. G. Wells: Changing the World (New York, Penguin Books, 2021) (ISBN 978-1-984-87902-8)
- A Life of My Own (London, Penguin Books, 2017) (ISBN 978-0-241-23995-7). Autobiography.
- Charles Dickens: A Life (New York, Penguin Books, 2011) (ISBN 0-14-103693-1).
- Thomas Hardy: The Time-Torn Man (New York, Penguin Press, 2007) (ISBN 978-1-594-20118-9).
- Samuel Pepys: The Unequalled Self (New York, Alfred A. Knopf, 2002) (ISBN 0-670-88568-1 or 0-14-028234-3).
- Jane Austen: A Life (Vintage eBooks, 2000) (ISBN 0-14-029690-5)
- Several Strangers; writing from three decades (London, Viking Books, 1999) (ISBN 0-670-88567-3); (New York, Penguin, 2000) (ISBN 0-14-190950-1).
- Katherine Mansfield: A Secret Life (London, Viking, 1987), 1998 (ISBN 0-14-011715-6).
- Mrs. Jordan's Profession: The Story of a Great Actress and a Future King, 1995 (ISBN 0-14-015923-1).
- The Invisible Woman: The Story of Nelly Ternan and Charles Dickens (London, Viking, 1990) (New York, Knopf, 1991) (ISBN 0-14-012136-6).
- Shelley and His World (London, Thames and Hudson, 1980) (ISBN 0-500-13068-X); (New York, Charles Scribner's Sons, 1980) (ISBN 0-68-416620-8).
- The Life and Death of Mary Wollstonecraft (London, Weidenfeld & Nicolson, 1974), 1992 (ISBN 0-14-016761-7).

Awards and achievements
Preceded by Wendy Doniger; Kate Flint	Rose Mary Crawshay Prize; 2003 and Jane Stabler	Succeeded by Maud Ellmann; Anne Stott
