= Jimmy Holmes (trade unionist) =

British trade union leader and politician

James Holmes (1850 – 1911) was a British trade union leader and politician.

Holmes began working in a knitwear factory, initially as a winding boy on hand frames, and later moved over to run powered knitting frames. In the early 1870s, he was a supporter of republicanism, and of Charles Bradlaugh and the National Secular Society. Around the middle of the decade, he was elected to the executive of the Leicester and Leicestershire Framework Knitters' Union, and was soon regarded as the leading trade unionist among the machine knitters.

In 1881, Holmes began working for the union, but he was unhappy with its focus on hand knitting, and in 1885, he led a split of machine knitters, to form the Leicester and Leicestershire Amalgamated Hosiery Union. Always one of its leading figures, he led a major strike in 1886, which ended with some concessions being made, and thereafter became its general secretary. The union grew steadily, was able to at times employ Holmes full-time. It also opened its own offices, and began issuing monthly reports. Holmes capitalised on this success by founding the Midland Counties Hosiery Federation in 1888, to bring together the major unions in the trade, followed in 1892 by the National Hosiery Federation. He was also a founding trustee of the General Federation of Trade Unions.

In 1881, Holmes became a spiritualist, and he began lecturing on the topic. His trade union post was not enough to live on, so he became a newsagent. In addition, he was the leading figure in the Leicester Co-operative Hosiery Society. He was also a leading figure in the Leicester Socialist League in the 1880s, working closely with Tom Barclay, and he was later a founder member of the Independent Labour Party. For four years, he served as a member of Leicester Town Council.

In 1911, Holmes became seriously ill with cancer, and it was discovered that he had embezzled a large amount of union money, enabling him to own 200 houses around Leicester.

Trade union offices
Preceded by Tom Barclay	General Secretary of the Leicester and Leicestershire Amalgamated Hosiery Union; 1886–1911	Succeeded by Jabez Chaplin
