= National Union of Leather Workers and Allied Trades =

Former trade union of the United Kingdom

The National Union of Leather Workers and Allied Trades was a trade union in the United Kingdom representing workers who made items out of leather.

The union was founded in 1928 with the merger of six small unions: the London and Provincial Society of Leather Finishers, the London Saddle and Harness Makers' Trade Society, the National Society of Portmanteau, Bag and Fancy Leather Workers, the Union of Saddlers and General Leather Workers, the United Society of Leather Producers and Leather Productions of Great Britain and Ireland, and the Walsall and District Amalgamated Leather Trades Union.

The union was active until 1971, when it merged with the Amalgamated Society of Leather Workers, the National Union of Boot and Shoe Operatives, and the National Union of Glovers and Leather Workers, to form the National Union of Footwear, Leather and Allied Trades.

== General Secretaries ==
1928: Samuel Cotterall
1931: W. Collingson
1956: C. J. Huggins
1964: H. P. Higginson
1965: Len Childs
