= David Lambert (trade unionist, born 1933) =

British trade union leader (1933–2023)

David Arthur Charles Lambert (2 September 1933 – 19 May 2023) was a British textile and garment workers' trade union leader.

Lambert grew up in Hitchin in Hertfordshire, where he attended the Hitchin Boys' School. On leaving school, he found work making hosiery for a large company, and joined the National Union of Hosiery and Knitwear Workers (NUHKW). From 1964, he worked full-time for the union, and he was elected as its general secretary in 1975.

In 1982, Lambert changed roles to become the general president of the NUHKW. He led the union into a merger which formed the National Union of Knitwear, Footwear and Apparel Trades (KFAT), and continued as general president of the new union until 1994. In 1988, his description of the closure of the apparently viable Mansfield Knitwear Company -as like amputating the torso of the industry at a stroke- was referenced by Alan Meale in an adjournment debate where he criticised the dumping of cheap knitwear in the UK.

In 1992, he also became the president of the International Textile, Garment and Leather Workers' Federation, retiring in 1996.

Lambert was elected to the General Council of the Trades Union Congress in 1984 and served for ten years. He also served on the Employment Appeal Tribunal, retiring from this last post in 2004.

Lambert died on 19 May 2023, at the age of 89.

Trade union offices
Preceded by Harold Gibson	General Secretary of the National Union of Hosiery and Knitwear Workers; 1975–1982	Succeeded by George Marshall
Preceded by Harold Gibson	General President of the National Union of Hosiery and Knitwear Workers; 1982–1991	Succeeded by Position abolished
Preceded by New position	General President of the National Union of Knitwear, Footwear and Apparel Trades; 1991–1994	Succeeded by Helen McGrath
Preceded by Charles P. McCarthy	Chair of the General Federation of Trade Unions; 1985–1987	Succeeded by James McChristie
Preceded by Berthold Keller	President of the International Textile, Garment and Leather Workers' Federation; 1992–1996	Succeeded by Peter Booth
