= Alice Larkin =

British climate scientist

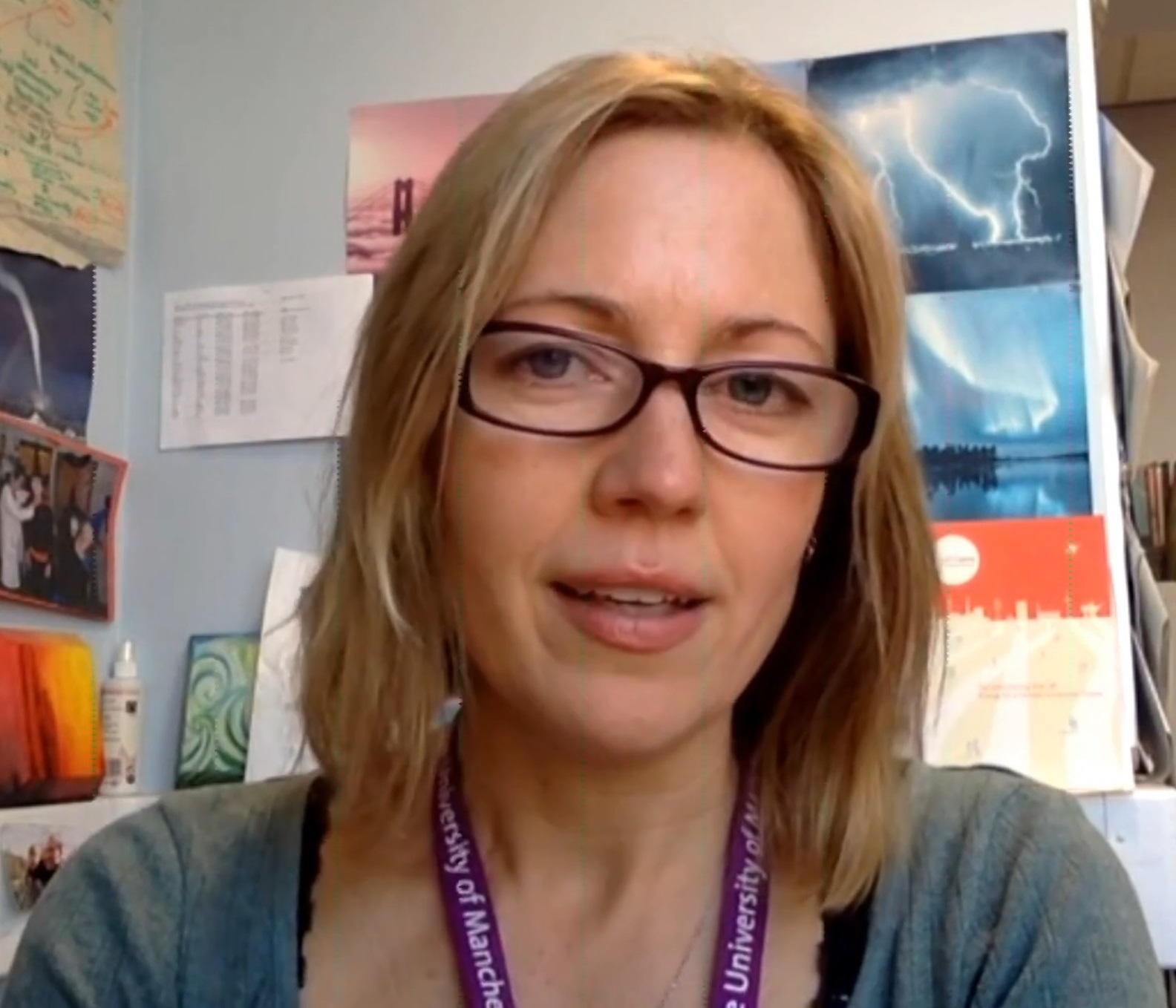
- Alice Larkin discusses climate change at Elevate Festival in 2015
- Born: Alice Larkin
- Other name: Alice Bows-Larkin
- Education: University of Leeds (BSc); Imperial College London (PhD)
- Known for: Climate policy
- Scientific career
- Fields: Climate change; Energy; Aviation; Shipping; Food
- Workplaces: Tyndall Centre; University of Manchester
- Thesis: Investigation into the effects of solar variability on climate using atmospheric models of the troposphere and stratosphere (2000)
- Doctoral advisor: Joanna Haigh
- Website: www.research.manchester.ac.uk/portal/alice.larkin.html

Alice Larkin (previous married name Bows) is a British climate scientist. She serves as Professor of Climate Science and Energy Policy in the School of Engineering at the University of Manchester. She works on carbon budgets, international transport and cumulative emissions.

== Education ==
Larkin studied astrophysics at the University of Leeds, graduating in 1996. She joined Imperial College London for her graduate studies, working on climate modelling, and completed her PhD in 2000 on the effects of solar variability on climate using atmospheric models of the troposphere and stratosphere supervised by Joanna Haigh.

== Career and research ==
Larkin worked in science communication for three years after her PhD. In 2003 Larkin joined the Tyndall Centre working on conflicts between climate change and policy. She is interested in ways that research can inform policy decisions. She became part of the team at Manchester, developing the energy scenario tool ASK in 2005, which allowed them to build low-carbon energy scenarios. She works on carbon budgets and cumulative emissions. She was involved in the creation of the Climate Change Act 2008. She was appointed a lecturer in 2008 and became Director of the Tyndall Centre in 2013. She remains a member of the Tyndall Centre council. In 2013 she called for more radical strategies to tackle climate change.

She became a Professor at the University of Manchester in 2015. She is part of the University Living Lab. She delivered a Ted Talk in 2015 entitled Climate Change is Happening, Here's How We Adapt. The talk considered the reality of climate change and the fate of a world where wealthy nations do not take any responsibility. It was described as the 'best human rights talk of the year' by City Atlas: New Haven. She also spoke at TEDxYouth@Manchester in 2015 and New Scientist live.

In 2016 Larkin was awarded the Researcher of the Year by University of Manchester. Larkin is interested in energy systems and international transport. She provided expert-witness to the trial of the Heathrow 13, protestors from the Plane Stupid campaign group, who chained themselves to Heathrow Airport's Northern Runway to protest against the impact of climate change. She avoids flying as she believes that climate change experts should act as role models in curbing aviation growth. In 2017 she was made Head of the School (now Department) of Mechanical, Aerospace and Civil Engineering (MACE) at the University of Manchester, and in 2019 became Head of the School of Engineering, a post held until October 2023. She has spoken extensively about climate change in mainstream media. She appeared on the podcast Introductions Necessary. She investigates the impact of the Paris Agreement for big-emitting nations.

=== Shipping in Changing Climates ===
Despite the global economic downturn, the shipping industry is expected to continually increase in carbon dioxide emissions. Larkin was a theme lead in the EPSRC project Shipping in Changing Climates. She develops models to predict climate-change across the world. These models inform how the shipping industry can prepare for the future. She proposed that the shipping industry use sails, biofuel and slow steaming.

=== Stepping Up ===
Larkin was principal investigator for the EPSRC project Stepping Up. The project looks for integrated solutions to future challenges in food, water and energy. She studied the emissions associated with the future global wheat demand. It combines anaerobic digestion, using insect protein for animal feed, recovery of the value of waste and ways to use surplus food from waste streams. Her research has been funded by the EPSRC and the Economic and Social Research Council (ESRC).
