= Nottingham Hosiery Finishers' Association =

Former trade union of the United Kingdom

The Nottingham Hosiery Finishers' Association (NHFA) was a trade union representing workers involved in trimming and putting together hosiery in the Nottingham area of England.

== History ==
The union was founded in 1921, when the Basford and District Hosiery Trimmers' and Finishers' Society, representing mostly better-paid men in the industry, merged with the Basford and District Bleaching, Dyeing, Scouring and Trimming Auxiliary Trades Association, which represented mostly lower-paid women.

As the largest of many local unions of hosiery finishers, the union played a leading role in the National Federation of Hosiery Dyers and Finishers. It was also prominent on the Nottingham and District Trades Council.

Jack Charlesworth, president of the union from 1934, left in 1942, but was overwhelmingly elected as general secretary in 1947, taking 1,007 votes to his nearest rival's 124. Under his leadership, membership grew from 1,768, to 2,708 by 1951, and 3,200 by 1969. In 1955, the union affiliated to the Trades Union Congress for the first time.

By the late 1960s, Charlesworth had become concerned that changes in the industry threatened the union's future. As a result, in October 1969, the union merged into the larger National Union of Hosiery and Knitwear Workers, becoming its Nottingham (Finishers) District.

== General Secretaries ==
1921: G. H. Perrans
1947: Jack Charlesworth
