= Ferdinand Hardijns =

Belgian trade unionist and politician

Ferdinandus Carolus Hardijns (16 September 1864 – 13 May 1927) was a Belgian trade unionist and politician.

Born in Ghent, Hardijns worked in a factory and was a founding member of the Belgian Labour Party, in 1885. The following year, he became the editor of Vooruit, a socialist newspaper. In it, he printed an appeal for the police not to shoot striking workers, and when he refused to print a response to the article, he was sentenced to two months in prison or a 200 franc fine.

In 1895, Hardijns became the general secretary of the International Federation of Textile Workers' Associations, serving for two years. Also in 1895, he was elected as a city councillor in Ghent, serving until 1926.

Media offices
Preceded by Edward Anseele	Editor of Vooruit; 1886–1901	Succeeded by Aimé Bogaerts
Preceded by Aimé Bogaerts	Editor of Vooruit; 1915–1927	Succeeded by Gust Balthazar
Trade union offices
Preceded by James Mawdsley	General Secretary of the International Federation of Textile Workers' Associations; 1895–1897	Succeeded by William Henry Wilkinson
