= William Marsland =

British trade unionist

William Marsland JP (1855 – 28 March 1917) was a British trade unionist.

Born in Hurst near Ashton-under-Lyne, Marsland worked from an early age as a half-timer in a hat factory. When he was 13, he began working full-time at a cotton mill and joined the Ashton Spinners' Association, while spending much of his spare time studying. As a result, in 1898, when the secretaryship of the Ashton Spinners became available, he took the top place in an examination, and won the post. Later in the year, he was also elected to the Ashton Board of Guardians.

In 1904, Marsland again won a general secretaryship by examination, becoming leader of the Amalgamated Association of Operative Cotton Spinners, to which the Ashton Spinners was affiliated. In 1905, he was additionally appointed as secretary of the International Federation of Textile Workers' Associations. He also served on the committee of the General Federation of Trade Unions, and on the council of the British Cotton Growing Association, for which in 1911 he went on a fact-finding trip to the Caribbean.

He died in his 52nd year.

Trade union offices
Preceded by ?	General Secretary of the Ashton and District Operative Spinners' Association; 1898–1904	Succeeded by Edward Judson
Preceded by William Howarth	General Secretary of the Amalgamated Association of Operative Cotton Spinners; 1904 – 1917	Succeeded by Henry Boothman
Preceded by William Henry Wilkinson	General Secretary of the International Federation of Textile Workers; 1905–1910	Succeeded by Tom Shaw
