= Bert Comerford =

British trade unionist (1915–2005)

Bert Comerford OBE
- Born: 3 November 1915; Northampton, U.K.
- Died: July 2005 (aged 89)
- Education: Kettering Road Intermediate School
- Organizations: National Union of Boot and Shoe Operatives; National Union of the Footwear, Leather and Allied Trades

Herbert Comerford OBE (3 November 1915 – July 2005) was a British trade unionist.

== Biography ==
Born in Northampton, Northamptonshire, he attended Kettering Road Intermediate School. At the age of fifteen, he became a clicker in the shoemaking industry, working for G. Webb & Sons. He served with the British Army during World War II, but in 1946 returned to his trade.

A long-term member of the National Union of Boot and Shoe Operatives (NUBSO), in 1959, Comerford began working full-time for the union, and in 1969 he was promoted to become assistant general officer. The following year, the union merged with others to form the National Union of the Footwear, Leather and Allied Trades (NUFLAT), and Comerford was elected as its first general president, the leading position in the union. The 1970s were a difficult period for the British footwear industry, and when he retired, in 1980, Comerford stated that he regretted leaving while the decline continued.

Comerford was made an Officer of the Order of the British Empire in the 1981 New Year Honours. In retirement, he served as an honorary member of the Clothing and Footwear Institute.

Trade union offices
Preceded by New position	General President of the National Union of the Footwear, Leather and Allied Trades; 1971–1980	Succeeded by Bob Stevenson
