= Karl-Erik Persson =

Swedish politician (1941–2016)

Karl-Erik Persson (21 March 1941 – 29 January 2016) was a Swedish politician and trade union leader.

Persson joined the Swedish Clothing Workers' Union, and by 1965 was its general secretary. In 1972, the union merged into the Swedish Textile, Garment and Leather Workers' Union, and in 1974, Persson was elected as its president. Under his leadership, the union lost most of its membership, as the relevant industries were in sharp decline in Sweden, and it eventually merged into the Swedish Industrial Union. From 1984 until 1988, he additionally served as president of the International Textile, Garment and Leather Workers' Federation.

Persson was also active in the Left Party, and was elected to represent Örebro County in the 1985 Swedish general election, serving until 1998.

Trade union offices
Preceded by Ivan Lind	President of the Swedish Textile, Garment and Leather Workers' Union; 1974–1993	Succeeded by Union merged
Preceded by Harold Gibson	President of the International Textile, Garment and Leather Workers' Federation; 1984–1988	Succeeded by Berthold Keller
