= Tonnis van der Heeg =

Tonnis van der Heeg (29 March 1886 – 15 August 1958) was a Dutch trade unionist, politician, and resistance activist.

Born in Groningen, van der Heeg became a tailor. He joined the Social Democratic Workers' Party (SDAP), inspired by his colleague, Evert Kupers, and also Progress through Brotherhood, a tailors' trade union. In 1908, he became the full-time leader of the Amsterdam district of the Union of the Clothing Industry, and he led a major, successful, strike, in 1913. In 1915, he became the union's general secretary, and then in 1918, its president.

As leader of the union, van der Heeg led a series of strikes which achieved a national wage scheme resulting in increased pay, reduced hours, and sick and holiday pay. He relocated to Hilversum in 1921, winning a seat on the city council in 1926, and becoming the local party chair in 1931. Although he was a founder of the Independent Socialist Party split, he returned to the SDAP within weeks. Although he was opposed to communism, he argued that communists should be free to join mainstream unions.

In 1919, van der Heeg helped refound the International Clothing Workers' Federation, and in 1920, he became its general secretary. In 1924, he spent a lengthy period in a sanatorium, suffering from tuberculosis, but he recovered well and returned to work the following year. He was elected to the executive of the Dutch Confederation of Trade Unions (NVV) in 1932, and was associated with its left-wing, calling for the union to devote more efforts to organising women, and for it to admit unemployed workers. In 1933, he called for a boycott of German goods, in opposition to its Nazi government, and he called for active support for the Republicans in the Spanish Civil War.

The Nazis occupied the Netherlands in 1940, and van der Heeg was fired from his union post, while in 1941, Hilversum council was dissolved. He found work as the head of the local Distribution Service, using the role to illicitly distribute ration cards to members of the Dutch resistance who were in hiding. The network was discovered in 1943, and van der Heeg went into hiding, until his arrest, late in 1944.

During the war, the Nazis had merged the Union of the Clothing Industry into the textile workers' union. Van der Heeg agreed that it should continue on a merged basis, as the General Union of Workers in Textile and Clothing Companies, and in 1945, he was elected as its president. He argued that the NVV should be more critical of government policy in Indonesia, and unsuccessfully argued that the NVV should merge with the communist Unity Trade Union. He retired in 1949.

Trade union offices
Preceded by ?	President of the Union of the Clothing Industry; 1918–1940	Succeeded by Union merged
Preceded by Heinrich Stühmer	General Secretary of the International Clothing Workers' Federation; 1920–1940	Succeeded by Andrew Conley
Preceded by Bart van Pelt	President of the General Industrial Union of Textiles and Clothing; 1945–1949	Succeeded by ?
