= Jack Greenhalgh (trade unionist) =

British trade union leader

John Greenhalgh (1908 – 28 May 1980) was a British trade union leader.

Greenhalgh worked in the cotton industry from the age of 15 and joined the Bolton and District Card, Blowing and Ring Room Operatives' Provincial Association, becoming chair of his branch and also serving on the national executive of the Cardroom Amalgamation from the age of 24. He soon moved to work full-time for the union, and at the age of 33, he became general secretary of the North East Lancashire Card and Blowing Room Operatives' and Ring Spinners' Association.

In 1949, he was elected as general secretary of the International Federation of Textile Workers' Associations. He negotiated a merger which, in 1960, formed the International Textile and Garment Workers' Federation, and remained general secretary of the new organisation. He focused on recruiting new affiliates outside Europe.

In 1970, Greenhalgh took the federation into a further merger, forming the International Textile, Garment and Leather Workers' Federation. He again became its first general secretary, but retired the following year, due to poor health. In 1980, he died in a car accident.

Trade union offices
Preceded by James Stott	General Secretary of the International Federation of Textile Workers' Associations; 1949–1960	Succeeded by Federation merged
Preceded by New position	General Secretary of the International Textile and Garment Workers' Federation; 1960–1970	Succeeded by Federation merged
Preceded by New position	General Secretary of the International Textile, Garment and Leather Workers' Federation; 1970–1971	Succeeded by Charles Ford
