= Pauline Pearce =

British political and anti-knife crime activist

Pauline Pearce is a British Liberal Democrat campaigner and anti-knife crime activist. Pearce came to prominence during the 2011 England riots, featuring in a viral video in which she chastised rioters, leading her to be dubbed the Heroine of Hackney.

== Early life and career ==
Pearce was born in Barbados and raised in Hitchin. She attended Purwell Primary School, Hitchin Girls' School and then North Hertfordshire College.

Pearce joined the Queen Mother Theatre and worked as a cleaner and care worker before launching into a jazz singing career, which included a show at the Edinburgh Fringe.

In 2000, Pearce was convicted of drug smuggling. She was sentenced to six years' imprisonment and served three years. She had attempted to import cocaine hidden in pickled peppers on her return from Jamaica. Pearce described the event as the biggest mistake of her life. Upon her release, Pearce retrained in catering and ran a number of West Indian-themed restaurant businesses. She moved to Hackney in 2004.

Pearce was diagnosed with breast cancer and had multiple rounds of treatment requiring her to carry a walking stick.

She has two sons, two daughters and four grandchildren.

Pearce auditioned for Britain's Got Talent in 2010 and 2012.

During the 2020 coronavirus pandemic, Pearce was stranded in the Gambia with her 84-year-old father, with no means of returning home. She urged the government to help stranded Britons to return home.

As well as English, Pearce speaks West Indian patois.

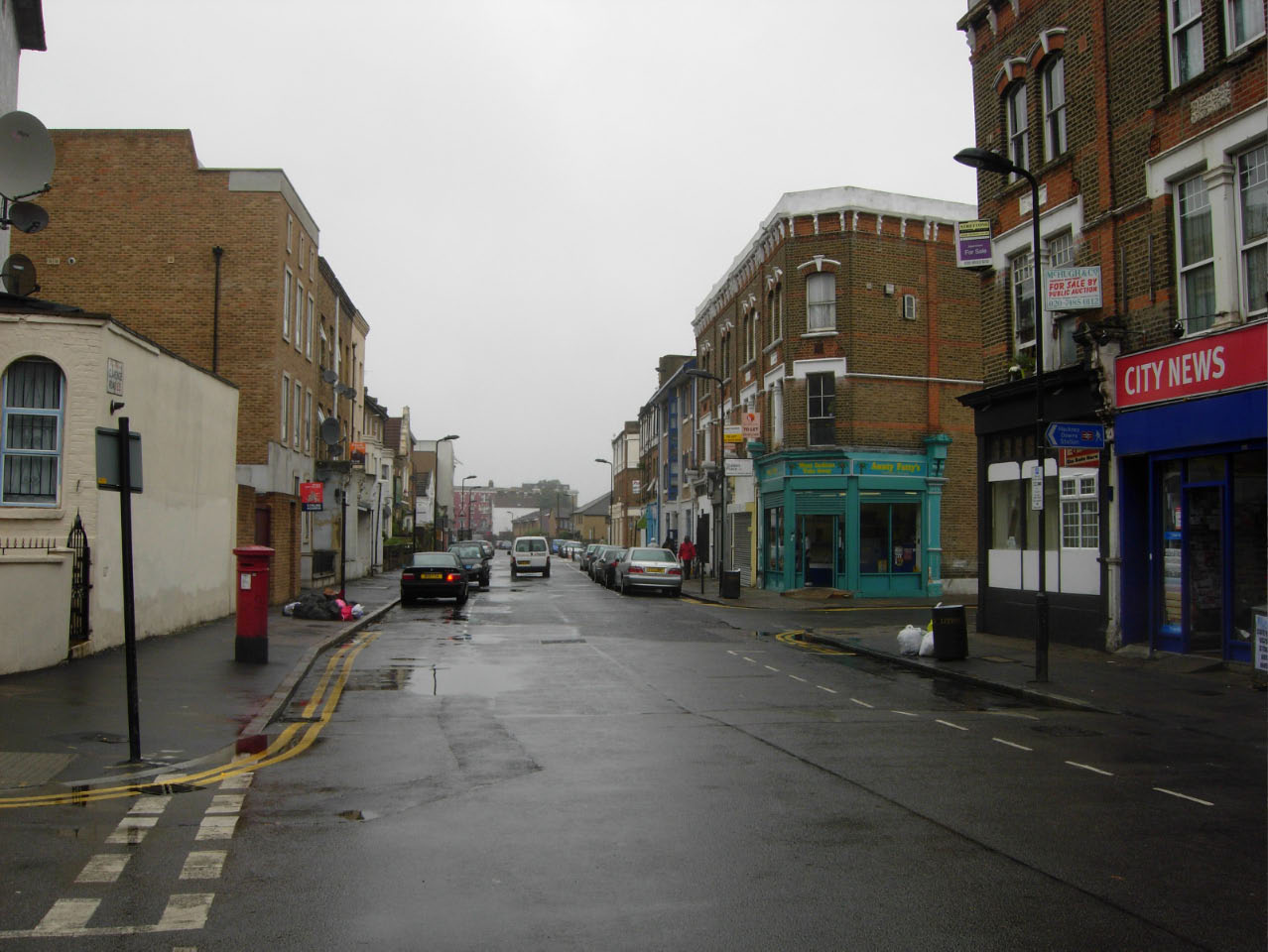
Clarence Road, Lower Clapton, the site of the looting and speech

== Heroine of Hackney ==
Pearce came to public prominence during the 2011 England riots. She was filmed close to a riot on Clarence Road in Lower Clapton, furiously chastising looters over their criminal behaviour.

An argument began when Pearce asked someone why he was burning vehicles. She pointed out that they belonged to local people who had saved money to buy them. An excuse was offered by a third person, saying that the owners had vehicle insurance policies. This angered Pearce, who did not find it acceptable. The subsequent speech berates rioters for looting instead of protesting about the death of Mark Duggan.

The 46-second clip was subsequently uploaded to YouTube, quickly becoming popular and receiving more than a million hits in a few hours. Its rapid spread was helped by tweeting from celebrities such as newspaper editor Piers Morgan.

Pearce was hailed as a heroine for helping to ease tensions in Hackney; her influence was acknowledged by politicians and the national press. MP for Hackney South and Shoreditch, Meg Hillier, invited Pearce to the Houses of Parliament. MP for Tottenham, David Lammy, commented that his deceased mother would have been devastated by the riots and would have reacted in a similar manner to Pearce.

Among newspaper columnists, Allison Pearson commented that Pearce was voicing what the rest of the country felt, and that young people need more people like her. Cassandra Jardine cited the speech as one example of resilience by those who have faced violence as a result of the riots. Zoe Williams wrote that Pearce's courage to intervene was more important than either the content or style of the speech. A fortnight after the event, Pearce took BBC London News reporter Paraic O'Brien on a tour of the recovering community.

Pearce reported feeling embarrassment at becoming an internet sensation but does not regret making the speech and apologised for the swearing. Speaking to The Australian newspaper, Pearce described the looting and vandalism as being "heart-breaking" and also contrasted people's relative poverty with expenditure for the Olympic Games.

In a later interview, Pearce said she also saved a junior reporter from a mob during the riots.

In September 2011, Pearce featured in The Spectator, dismissing David Starkey's view that hip-hop culture was partly to blame for the riots. In the same month, she was awarded the Team London Award at the annual Peace Awards by Boris Johnson.

== Political career ==
=== Community activism ===
Pearce's youngest son was a victim of knife crime in 2009, which led her to become an activist against knife crime, running a community project known as Do Something for Life. Pearce hosted a Monday afternoon show on Conscious Radio, called More Love, which she used for her activism. Do Something for Life is also the name of a single Pearce hoped to release to raise money for charity.

In 2018, Pauline worked with Social Butterflies, a ten-week programme for young people at risk of being excluded from their school.

=== Liberal Democrats ===
After her Heroine of Hackney fame, Pearce was approached by multiple British political parties. Despite coming from a staunchly Labour family, and not having voted in the previous three elections, Pearce joined the Liberal Democrats in 2012.

On 3 May 2012, she contested a local by-election in the Hackney Central ward of Hackney London Borough Council, coming third with 15.3% of the vote. Her campaign opposed the coalition government's spending cuts, called for more community centres and opposed the use of water cannons and CS gas by riot police.

Pearce intended to stand in the Liberal Democrat presidential election of 2014. She withdrew from the election in August 2014, accusing the party of "underhand racism" and "Neanderthal views on diversity": she claimed that senior party figures would not support her as a result of her previous criminal conviction.

In the 2015 general election, Pearce contested the constituency of Hitchin and Harpenden. She came fourth with 8.1% of the vote.

At the party's conference in Autumn 2016, Pearce proposed a motion to commit the Liberal Democrats to oppose nationalism, racism and the far-right. The motion was passed.

In December 2016, Pearce was elected onto the Federal Board of the Liberal Democrats.

In the 2017 general election, Pearce contested the constituency of Barking. She came fifth with 1.3% of the vote.

In December 2017, Pearce was selected to stand as the party's candidate in the Mayor of Hackney election by a unanimous vote of local party members. Her campaign prioritised her opposition to Brexit and tackling knife crime, for which she proposed a Violence Reduction Unit modelled on that in Scotland. At the election on 3 May 2018, she came fourth with 7.5% of the vote. On the same day, Pearce contested the Brownswood ward of Hackney; she came fourth with 8.7% of the vote.
