= United Italian Federation of Clothing Workers =

Trade union of Italy

The United Italian Federation of Clothing Workers (Italian: Federazione Unitaria Italiana Lavoratori dell'Abbigliamento, FUILA) was a trade union representing workers in the clothing and footwear industries in Italy.

The union was founded in about 1950 as an affiliate of the Italian Confederation of Workers' Trade Unions (CISL). It also joined the International Garment Workers' Federation and the International Shoe and Leather Workers' Federation.

By 1954, the union claimed 55,186 members, but by 1965 it was down to 39,417 members. That year, it merged with the Italian Federation of Textile Workers, to form the Italian Federation of Textile and Clothing Workers.

== General Secretaries ==
c.1950: Silvio Ascari
c.1960: Bruno Fassina
