= Notts Trades Council =

Trade union association in England

The Notts Trades Council, formally known as the Nottinghamshire Nottingham and Mansfield Trades Council, brings together trade unionists in Nottinghamshire, in England.

== Forerunners ==
In 1861, a group of employers in Nottingham established a local Chamber of Commerce. This inspired trade unionists in the city, including William H. Leatherland, to form the Nottingham Association of Organised Trades. They aimed to settle disputes through negotiations, rather than industrial action, and more generally to unite trade unionists and encourage local trade unions to be run more efficiently.

The association maintained a low level of activity through the 1860s, supporting the Derbyshire and Nottinghamshire Miners' Association during its strike of 1866 and 1867, and the London tailors during their strike in 1867. It was represented at the short-lived United Kingdom Alliance of Organised Trades, and also in early meetings of the Trades Union Congress (TUC). In 1872, it hosted the congress, and Leatherland served as President of the TUC. Soon after this, it changed its name to the Nottingham Organised Trades Council.

In 1875, local disputes led to the formation of a rival Nottingham Federated Trades Council. Initially, the Organised Trades continued to grow, and by 1878 it represented more than 6,000 members, via an executive with forty members. The most important unions represented were the Amalgamated Society of Operative Lace Makers and Auxiliary Workers and the Rotary Framework Knitters. However, over the next few years, both councils declined in membership, and important unions such as the Amalgamated Society of Carpenters and Joiners (ASC&J), Nottinghamshire Miners' Association, Amalgamated Society of Railway Servants (ASRS), and Amalgamated Society of Engineers (ASE), were not affiliated to either.

In 1884, the Organised Trades worked with the Federated Trades, and the local Building Trades Council, to form a United Trades Council of Nottingham. Initially, this consisted of a committee with four representatives from each council, but the secretaries of the local branches of the ASE and ASC&J were soon added, and the council began practical solidarity work, supporting a local bricklayers' strike, and then organising a demonstration to encourage lace makers in Long Eaton to unionise. Other actions were unsuccessful, including lobbying against mistreatment of checkweighmen who were active trade unionists, and against Nottingham Town Council awarding building contracts to companies based outside the city.

At the 1885 UK general election, John Burns of the Social Democratic Federation stood in Nottingham West. While some individual trade unionists supported him, the Organised Trades passed a motion stating that it was not backing any candidate. Most leading figures supported the Liberal-Labour movement, and after Henry Broadhurst won the seat at the 1886 UK general election, the union council wrote to William Gladstone to thank him for appointing Broadhurst as Under-Secretary of State for the Home Department.

Sam Bower and William Bailey were both adopted as Liberal-Labour candidates for the town council in 1889, although the United Trades Council remained officially non-political. Four delegates to the Building Trades Council instead gave their backing to a Conservative Party candidate. The ill-feeling generated by this led the Building Trades Council to withdraw from the United Trades Council. This spurred the Organised Trades and the Federated Trades to merge, forming the Nottingham Trades Council.

== History ==
The trades council first met on 19 July 1890. It initially had affiliations from 21 trade union branches, but another 17 affiliated before the end of 1891, including the Miners, the ASRS, and the new National Union of Gas Workers and General Labourers. Inspired by the New Unionism movement, one of its first acts was to host a talk by Emilia Dilke of the Women's Trade Union League, and this led to the establishment of a union of women hosiery workers.

The council began supporting political candidates, the first being John Skerritt, who stood in Wollaton without the backing of the Liberal Party. Skerritt was a joiner, and this convinced the Building Trades Council to work with the Nottingham Trades Council and some local socialists, forming the Workers' Electoral Federation in March 1891. This organisation was affiliated to the Labour Electoral Association, and endorsed trade unionists who stood for any political party, including Harry Collier who stood for the Conservatives. Skerritt was elected, but three other candidates were unsuccessful, and the organisation was soon replaced by an Independent Labour Union.

During the 1890s, the council spent much time supporting member unions who were involved in disputes, and also raised money for trade unionists who were unable to work. In 1897, it persuaded the town council to place contracts with suppliers which paid agreed trade union rates. It grew in scope in 1903, when the Beeston Trades Council affiliated. It stood candidates for the School Board and the Board of Guardians, and by 1905 had five members on the latter body. At the 1906 UK general election, Arthur Richardson was elected in Nottingham South, and he often consulted with the trades council on how to vote in Parliament.

By 1908, the council represented 40,000 workers in 65 trade unions, and it grew further when the Building Trades Council finally merged in. Interest in syndicalism rose, although the city was not in the forefront of the movement. Later, the council became known for the Communist Party of Great Britain members among its leadership, with Ernie Cant important around 1930, and Jack Charlesworth becoming the secretary in 1950.

The council was eventually renamed as the Nottingham and District Trades Council, then as the Nottingham and District Trades Union Council, and eventually as the Nottinghamshire Nottingham and Mansfield Trades Council.

=== Secretaries ===
1890: John Jepson
1894: W. L. Hardstaffe
1899: John Thorneloe
c.1910: George Thundercliffe
1931: Ernest Button
1950: Jack Charlesworth
1970:
1980s: Ian Juniper
2006: Richard Buckwell
2010s: Paul Martin/ Liam Conway
2021 - present: Alan Barker
