= John Newton (trade unionist) =

British trade unionist

John Edward Newton (16 June 1908 – 4 January 1993) was a British trade unionist.

Born in Lofthouse in Yorkshire, Newton began work in tailoring at the age of 21. He won awards for his cutting and design skills, but increasingly came to focus on trade unionism.

Newton was elected as the president of the Middlesbrough branch of the National Union of Tailors and Garment Workers (NUTGW) in 1939, he was elected to the union's executive council in 1943, then became assistant regional organiser for the North of England in 1947 and then regional organiser in 1948. In 1952, he was elected as the union's general secretary, taking over from Anne Loughlin the following year. He also served as president of the International Textile and Garment Workers' Federation from its formation, then as the first president of the new International Textile, Garment and Leather Workers' Federation, standing down in 1972.

Newton resigned as secretary of the NUTGW in 1968, citing the pressure of work. He also served on the executive council of the Trades Union Congress (TUC), and was President of the TUC in 1969.

Trade union offices
Preceded by Anne Loughlin	General Secretary of the National Union of Tailors and Garment Workers; 1953 – 1968	Succeeded by Jack Macgougan
Preceded by Anne Loughlin	Clothing Group representative on the General Council of the TUC; 1953 – 1970	Succeeded by Jack Macgougan
Preceded by Lewis Wright	President of the Trades Union Congress; 1969	Succeeded by Sidney Greene
Preceded by New position	President of the International Textile, Garment and Leather Workers' Federation; 1970–1972	Succeeded by Karl Buschmann
