= Italian Federation of Textile Workers (CISL) =

Trade union of Italy

The Italian Federation of Textile Workers (Italian: Federazione Italiana dei Lavoratori Tessili, FILT) was a trade union representing workers in the textile industry in Italy.

The union was founded in April 1950, with the merger of FIL Textiles and the Free Italian Federation of Textile Trade Unionists. Both were largely composed of Christian democratic trade unionists who had recently left the Italian General Confederation of Labour-affiliated Italian Federation of Textile Workers. The new union affiliated to the Italian Confederation of Workers' Trade Unions (CISL), and the International Federation of Textile Workers' Associations.

By 1954, the union claimed 150,456 members, but by 1961 it was down to 102,168 members. In 1965, it merged with the United Italian Federation of Clothing Workers, to form the Italian Federation of Textile and Clothing Workers.

== General Secretaries ==
1950: Amleto Barni
c.1960: Bruno Fassina
