= National Union of Knitwear, Footwear and Apparel Trades =

Former trade union of the United Kingdom

KFAT
- National Union of Knitwear, Footwear and Apparel Trades
- Merged into: Community
- Founded: 1991
- Dissolved: 2004
- Headquarters: 55 New Walk, Leicester
- Location: United Kingdom
- Members: 82,303 (1991); 16,000 (2002)
- Affiliations: TUC
- Website: www.kfat.org.uk

The National Union of Knitwear, Footwear and Apparel Trades (KFAT) was a trade union in the United Kingdom.

== History ==
The National Union of Knitwear, Footwear and Apparel Trades was formed in 1991 through the amalgamation of the National Union of Hosiery and Knitwear Workers and the National Union of the Footwear, Leather and Allied Trades. It had 82,303 members when it was formed. KFAT organised a range of clothing-related workers and was particularly strong in areas of the East Midlands including Nottinghamshire, Leicestershire and Northamptonshire, with other members in Lancashire textile regions and the Yorkshire leather-producing industry. It absorbed the Rossendale Union of Boot, Shoe and Slipper Operatives in the mid-1990s. The union was notable for its high proportion of female members - roughly half of its members in 2004 being women.

After initially considering amalgamation with the National Union of Tailors and Garment Workers KFAT merged with the Iron and Steel Trades Confederation in 2004 to form Community.

== Leadership ==
=== General presidents ===
1991: David Lambert
1994: Helen McGrath
1999: Tony Hallam

=== General secretaries ===
1991: George Browett
1992: Helen McGrath
1994: Paul Gates
