= National Union of the Footwear, Leather and Allied Trades =

Former trade union of the United Kingdom

NUFLAT
- National Union of the Footwear, Leather and Allied Trades
- Merged into: National Union of Knitwear, Footwear and Apparel Trades
- Founded: 1971
- Dissolved: 1991
- Headquarters: The Grange, Earls Barton
- Location: United Kingdom
- Members: 22,894 (1991)
- Publication: NUFLAT Monthly Journal and Report
- Affiliations: TUC, Labour, ISLWF

The National Union of the Footwear, Leather and Allied Trades (NUFLAT) was a trade union in the United Kingdom which existed between 1971 and 1991. It represented workers in the leather and footwear industry.

== History ==
The union was founded in 1971, with the merger of the Amalgamated Society of Leather Workers, the National Union of Boot and Shoe Operatives, the National Union of Glovers and Leather Workers and the National Union of Leather Workers and Allied Trades. Although initially a strong union with many closed shop agreements, its membership fell rapidly due to large-scale redundancies in the industry. In 1991, it merged with the National Union of Hosiery and Knitwear Workers to form the National Union of Knitwear, Footwear and Apparel Trades. By the time of the merger, membership had fallen to 22,894. After further mergers, this eventually became part of Community.

== Election results ==
The union sponsored a Labour Party candidate in several Parliamentary elections.

Election	Constituency	Candidate	Votes	Percentage	Position
Feb 1974 general election	Melton	Roy Mayhew	16,228	23.9	3
1979 general election	Northampton South	Graham Mason	15,491	40.2	2

== Officials ==
=== General Presidents ===
1971: Bert Comerford
1980: Bob Stevenson

=== General Secretaries ===
1971: Tom Moore
1973: Bill Jones
1976: Sid Clapham
1983: Gordon Stewart
1988: George Browett
