= The Priory School, Hitchin =

The Priory School
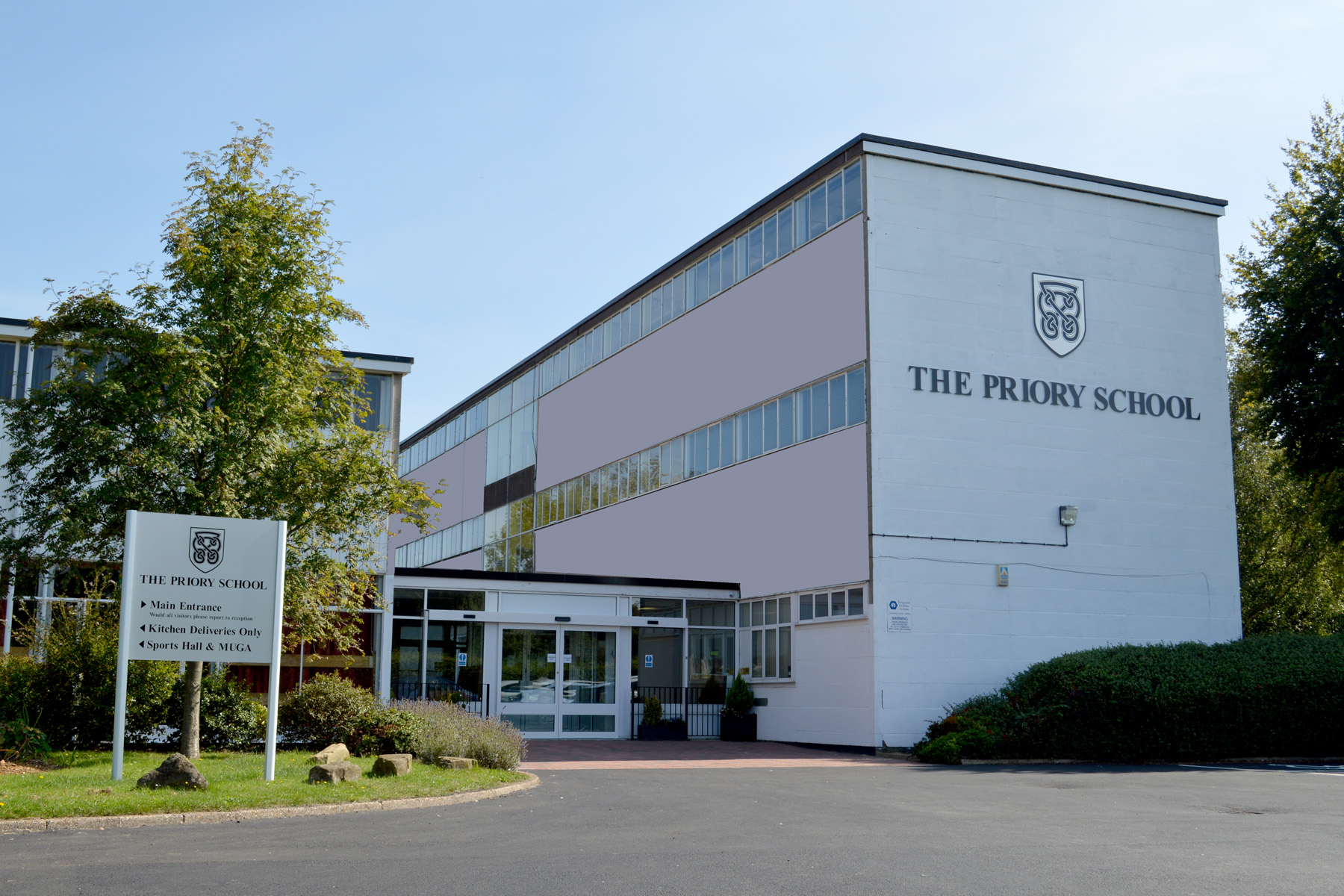

Location
- Bedford Road; Hitchin, Hertfordshire, SG5 2UR; England

Information
- Type: Foundation school
- Motto: "Responsibility, Respect, Resilience"
- Established: 1988
- Local authority: Hertfordshire County Council
- Department for Education URN: 117499 Tables
- Ofsted: Reports
- Headteacher: Matt Blayney
- Gender: Mixed
- Age: 11 to 18
- Enrolment: 1206
- Colours: Red, White, Black
- Website: http://www.priory.herts.sch.uk/

The Priory School is a mixed-sex education secondary school and sixth form located in Hitchin in the English county of Hertfordshire.

The Priory School is the only co-educational secondary school in Hitchin. It is part of the Hitchin Consortium, with Hitchin Boys' School and Hitchin Girls' School, for sixth form.

== History ==
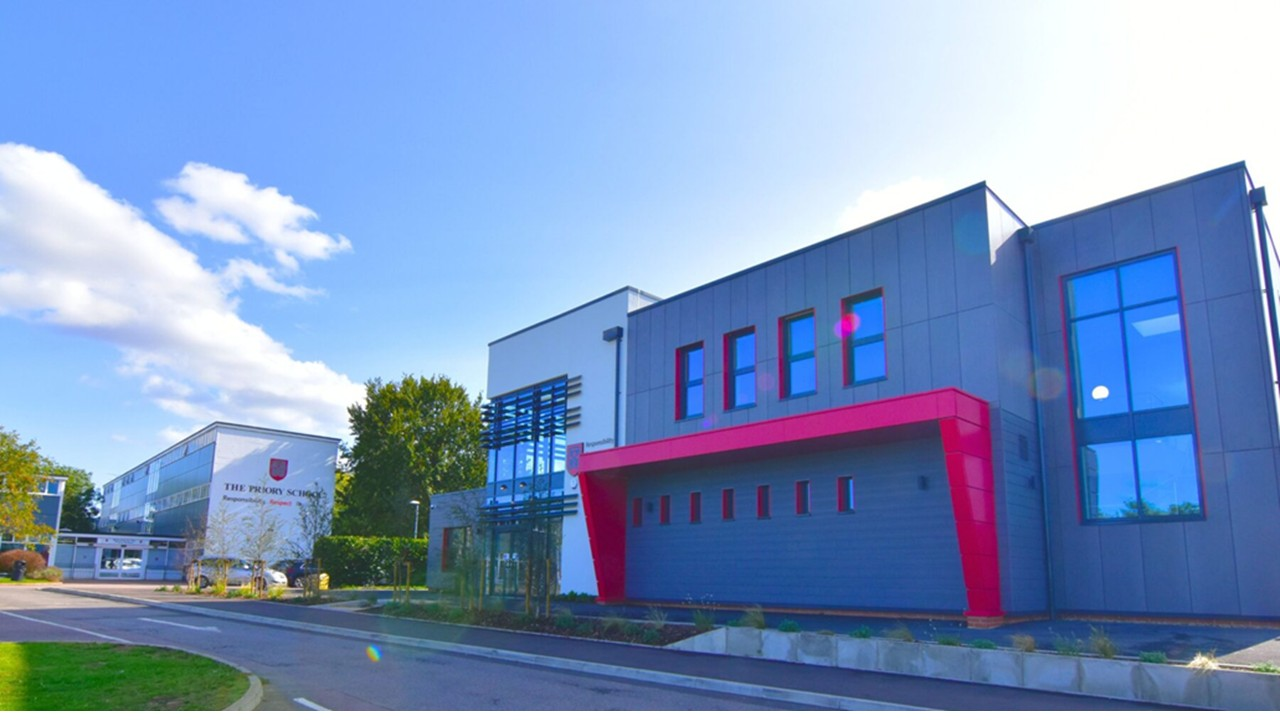
View of the new Sixth Form block and main entrance to the Priory School, Hitchin

Hitchin High School for Girls was opened in 1954 by Queen Elizabeth the Queen Mother, becoming Bowes Lyon in 1974.

In 1988, it became a comprehensive school, and was renamed the Priory School after the amalgamation of Bowes Lyon and Hitchin School (Bessemer), but has since gained specialism in Computing, Business and Enterprise. Previously a community school wholly operated by Hertfordshire County Council, in 2016 the Priory School converted to foundation school status. As such, the governing body and senior leadership team have taken on extra responsibilities from Hertfordshire County Council in operating the school.

In September 2025, Matt Blayney became headteacher, having served as a deputy headteacher at Saffron Walden County High School in Essex.

The Priory School was a member of the Stonewall scheme, and in 2017 was visited by actor Ian McKellen, who gave a talk about LGBTQ+ rights. The school has a resident counsellor, and sixteen staff members have been trained in mental health first aid.

== Facilities ==
Located on a site area of approximately 27 acres, The Priory School has a 25-foot climbing wall with a traverse section, a sports hall, a gymnasium, a floodlit multi-use games area, netball pitches and a dance studio. It also has a large 3G football pitch that is home to the Hitchin Belles football team, the UK's biggest all-female football club.

== Notable former pupils ==
- Molly-Mae Hague, reality star
- Makgotso M, actress
- Jack Wilshere, football player and manager
