= Leicester and Leicestershire Amalgamated Hosiery Union =

Former trade union of the United Kingdom

The Leicester and Leicestershire Amalgamated Hosiery Union was a trade union representing machine knitters in Leicestershire.

Until 1885, machine knitters in Leicestershire were represented by the Leicester and Leicestershire Framework Knitters' Union, but Jimmy Holmes argued that it prioritised the interests of hand knitters. He led a breakaway of about 500 members, forming the Leicester and Leicestershire Amalgamated Hosiery Union.

The union grew rapidly, and in 1888 it began working with the Nottingham United Rotary Power Framework Knitters' Society and the new Ilkeston and District Hosiery Union in the Midland Counties Hosiery Federation. From 1892, it worked with these unions and various other small unions in the National Amalgamated Hosiery Federation.

The union's Loughborough branch broke away in 1895, forming the Loughborough Federated Hosiery Union, but it continued to grow. In 1911, when terminally ill, Holmes was found to have embezzled large amounts of money from the union and the national federation, but it survived without him, reaching a peak membership of 8,538 in 1926. In 1928, Horace Moulden was appointed as its general secretary, and in 1945 he finally persuaded the various hosiery unions to merge, forming the National Union of Hosiery and Knitwear Workers.

== General Secretaries ==
1886: Tom Barclay
1886: Jimmy Holmes
1911: Jabez Chaplin
1928: George Bailey and Horace Moulden
1931: Horace Moulden
