= Textile and Clothing Union =

The Textile and Clothing Union (German: Gewerkschaft Textil-Bekleidung, GTB) was a West German trade union representing textile and clothing workers.

The union was founded in 1949, and affiliated to the German Trade Union Confederation. Its membership steadily declined, and by 1997, it had 183,349 members. The following year, it merged into IG Metall.

== Presidents ==
1949: Werner Bock
1963: Karl Buschmann
1978: Berthold Keller
1990: Willi Arens
