= National Union of Hosiery and Knitwear Workers =

Former trade union of the United Kingdom

NUHKW
- National Union of Hosiery and Knitwear Workers
- Merged into: National Union of Knitwear, Footwear and Apparel Trades
- Founded: 1 January 1945
- Dissolved: 1991
- Headquarters: 55 New Walk, Leicester
- Location: United Kingdom
- Members: 74,077 (1977)
- Publication: NUHKW Journal
- Affiliations: TUC

The National Union of Hosiery and Knitwear Workers (NUHKW) was a trade union in the United Kingdom.

== History ==
The union was founded in 1945, with the merger of five local unions: the Hinckley and District Hosiery Union, Ilkeston and District Hosiery Union, Leicester and Leicestershire Amalgamated Hosiery Union, Loughborough Federated Hosiery Union and Nottingham and District Hosiery Workers' Society. Shortly after, most Scottish unions voted to join the new organisation. Sections were also created for northern and southern England and, by the end of the year, it had 22,430 members. The following year, it secured a national agreement limiting night work and restricting total working to 45 hours per week.

District	Membership in December 1945
Hinckley	4,425
Ilkeston	5,015
Leicester	4,578
Loughborough	1,600
Northern	340
Nottingham	3,544
Scottish	2,424
Southern	504

In 1970, a threat of national strike action secured a 10% wage increase and the abandonment of plans for a continuous shift system. Membership of the union continued to grow, reaching a peak of 74,077 in 1977.

In 1969, the Nottingham Hosiery Finishers' Association amalgamated with the union, becoming its Nottingham (Finishers) District. This was followed by the Leicester and Leicestershire Trimmers' and Auxiliary Association in 1970, and then all the other minor unions in the industry. The long-established Amalgamated Society of Operative Lace Makers and Textile Workers also joined. However, widespread redundancies in the sector began reducing membership. In 1991, it merged with the National Union of Footwear, Leather and Allied Trades, with 34,183 members remaining to join the new National Union of Knitwear, Footwear and Apparel Trades.

== Leadership ==
=== General Presidents ===
1945: Horace Moulden
1963: George Dearing
1968: Peter Pendergast
1975: Harold Gibson
1982: David Lambert

=== General Secretaries ===
1945: Clifford Groocock
1960: George Dearing
1963: Harold Gibson
1975: David Lambert
1982: George Marshall
1984: Tom Kirk
1989: Helen McGrath
