= Leicester and District Trades Union Council =

English Trade Unionist Association

The Leicester and District Trades Union Council brings together trade unionists in and around Leicester, in England.

== History ==
In the 1860s, the Leicester unions of Labourers, Trimmers, Hose Shirt and Drawers, and Sock and Top Union, formed a loose association to discuss matters of common interest, under the leadership of Isaac Abbott. In 1872, on the initiative of Daniel Merrick, it was replaced by a broader organisation, the Leicester Trades Council. The formation was inspired by concern over the Criminal Law Amendment Act, and perhaps also by the Trades Union Congress (TUC) being held in Nottingham in 1871.

In 1875, Phoebe Mason of the Seamers' and Stitchers' Society was elected to the council, the first woman known to have served on any trade council in the UK. That year, Leicester hosted the TUC, and Merrick, representing the trades council, was elected as President of the TUC. By 1891, the council had 17,000 affiliated members, of whom, 13,500 were members of the Leicester and Leicestershire Amalgamated Hosiery Union, or the National Union of Boot and Shoe Operatives.

The council endorsed several candidates for the Leicester Town Council and School Board, including Merrick, Thomas Smith and George Sedgwick. In 1890, the council backed several Labour Association candidates, who were elected to Leicester Town Council as Liberal-Labour members, but thereafter, the growing influence of socialists on the council led it to distance itself from Liberal candidates. In 1893, this led it to support a May Day demonstration, in support of the movement for an eight-hour day, while at the 1894 Leicester by-election, it backed Joseph Burgess, the Independent Labour Party candidate. It became a founding affiliate of the Labour Representation Committee in 1900.

In 1962, the trades council sponsored a major arts festival in the city. From the late 1960s, the trades council became strongly involved in anti-racist activity in the city. In 1977, after the Conservative Party-controlled council gave the National Front permission to sell their paper outside Leicester Town Hall, the council's anti-racist committee organised a successful picket of it.

== Leadership ==
=== Presidents ===
1872: Daniel Merrick
1884: Joseph H. Woolley
1885:
1890: Joseph Potter
1891:
1892: Charles Harris
1893: George Banton
1895:
1896: Harry Hardwick Woolley
1897:
1899: Tom Carter
1900: Job Cobley
1901: Alfred Hill
1902: Frederick Wheeler
1903: Martin Curley
1904:
1905: George Albert Kenney
1906:
1907: George Hubbard
1909:
1914: T. Rowland Hill
1915: E. Burns
1916: Alfred Hill
1917:
1918: John Riley
1919: Thomas Adnitt
1920: Frank Acton
1921: Edwin Baum

1923: Albert Edward Monk
1923: George Bell
1924: George Albert Kenney
1925: Ernest Grimsley
1926: William Henry Smith
1927: Fred West
1928: Thomas Frederick Richards
1929: Abraham Odell
1930: Will Maw
1931: Fred Jackson

1934: Teddy Peacock
1935: Edith Alice Scott
1936: Alfred H. Hawkins

1938: James W. Green

1944: Bertram Powell

1946: Teddy Peacock
1946: Sidney Bridges

1952: Arthur Marriott

1954: Albert Hall
1955: William Whitlock
1956: Percy Watts

1958: Teddy Peacock
1958: Tamil Mukherjee

1967: Ken Hazeldeane

1969: Bill Hynes
1970: Albert Hall
1972:

=== Secretaries ===
1872: Joseph Sharp
1885: George Green
1903: Tom Carter
1910: Martin Curley
1910: Fredrick Sutton
1912: James Baum
1916: Albert Edward Monk
1918: James Baum
1923:
1926: T. Rowland Hill
1932: Will Maw
1945:
