= Central Union of Shoemakers of Germany =

- Zentralverband der Schuhmacher Deutschlands
- Successor: Industrial Union of Leather (E Germany); Leather Union (W Germany)
- Founded: August 1883
- Dissolved: 2 May 1933
- Headquarters: 1 Essenweinstraße, Nuremberg
- Location: Germany
- Members: 78,834 (1928)
- Key people: Josef Simon (President)
- Publication: Der Schuhmacher
- Affiliations: ADGB, IFBSO

The Central Union of Shoemakers of Germany (German: Zentralverband der Schuhmacher Deutschlands, ZVdSch) was a trade union representing people working in the shoemaking industry in Germany.

The union was founded in August 1883 at a meeting in Gotha, as the Support Association of German Shoemakers. Due to the Anti-Socialist Laws, it could not describe itself as a trade union, but it operated unemployment and relocation funds for workers. It established headquarters in Offenbach am Main, and in 1887 renamed itself as the Union of German Shoemakers. In 1890, it began admitting women, the first men's union in Germany to do so.

In 1900, Josef Simon became the leader of the union, and led it through a difficult five years of strikes, lock outs, and economic struggles. In 1904, it became the "Central Union of Shoemakers of Germany", and it began growing more rapidly. It was the main founder of the International Federation of Boot and Shoe Operatives in 1907, and a founding affiliate of the General German Trade Union Confederation in 1919. By 1928, it had 78,834 members.

The union was banned by the Nazi government in 1933. After World War II, shoemakers were represented by the Leather Union.
