= Charles Freak =

British trade unionist and politician

Charles Freak (1847 – 28 July 1910) was a British trade unionist and politician.

Born in Southampton, Freak worked as a laster. He spent several years working in the United States, but returned to the United Kingdom in the early 1870s, and joined the new National Union of Boot and Shoe Operatives (NUBSO). He soon came to prominence in the union, representing it at the Trades Union Congress. In 1879, he became the full-time secretary of the union's London Metropolitan branch, later moving to become the branch president.

In 1892, Freak was elected as a Labour Progressive member of London County Council in Bethnal Green North East, one of the first eight Labour members of the council. He held the seat in 1895 and 1898, but lost it in 1901.

Freak and William Inskip, also a leader of NUBSO, were part of an antisemitic campaign against Jewish shoe makers. As the mechanisation of the industry continued apace, The pair of them blamed Jewish shoemakers for the economic consequences. From 1892 they started to campaign for immigration restrictions which they took to the 1895 Cardiff Trade Union Congress. However Joseph Finn, Woolf Wess and Lewis Lyons organised amongst jewish trade unionists to protest against Inskip and Freak. Joseph Finn published A Voice from the Aliens criticising them from an internationalist perspective.

In 1899, Freak was elected as the General President of NUBSO, holding the post until his death. He relocated to Leicester, and in 1904 was elected to Leicester Town Council. He was also a member of the council of the International Arbitration League. He frequently clashed with general secretary William Inskip, despite both being on the right wing of the union, and for example, he strongly opposed Inskip's proposal of a "fighting fund" levy on members.

Freak was known for his distinctive old-fashioned style of dress, wearing a long beard and frock coat.

Trade union offices
Preceded by W. Boyd Hornidge	General President of the National Union of Boot and Shoe Operatives; 1899 – 1910	Succeeded by Thomas Frederick Richards
