= William Inskip =

English trade unionist

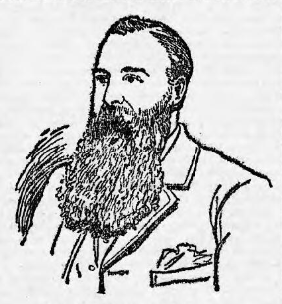
Inskip in 1895

William John Inskip (1852 – May 1899) was an English trade unionist.

Inskip grew up in Leicester, where he worked as a laster in the bootmaking trade. He became active in the National Union of Boot and Shoe Operatives (NUBSO), of which he was elected treasurer in 1880, then general secretary in 1886.

In 1891, Inskip was elected to Leicester Town Council as a Liberal-Labour representative, and he was also appointed as a magistrate. However, he became increasingly politically isolated, as other leading figures in the union shifted to supporting independent labour representation.

Inskip and Charles Freak, also a leader of NUBSO, were part of an antisemitic campaign against Jewish shoe makers. As the mechanisation of the industry continued apace, The pair of them blamed Jewish shoemakers for the economic consequences. From 1892 they started to campaign for immigration restrictions which they took to the 1895 Cardiff Trade Union Congress. However Joseph Finn, Woolf Wess and Lewis Lyons organised amongst jewish trade unionists to protest against Inskip and Freak. Joseph Finn published A Voice from the Aliens criticising them from an internationalist perspective.

Inskip was also active in the Trades Union Congress (TUC), serving on its Parliamentary Committee, and also as its treasurer. In 1898, he travelled to the United States as part of a TUC delegation, but on his return, he contracted tuberculosis, and he died in 1899, aged 47.

Trade union offices
Preceded by George Sedgwick	General Secretary of the National Union of Boot and Shoe Operatives; 1886 – 1899	Succeeded by W. Boyd Hornidge
Preceded by Henry Slatter	Treasurer of the Trades Union Congress; 1890 – 1899	Succeeded by C. W. Bowerman
Preceded by Edward Harford and Havelock Wilson	Trades Union Congress representative to the American Federation of Labour; 1898; With: Will Thorne	Succeeded by James Haslam and Alexander Wilkie
