= International Federation of Boot and Shoe Operatives and Leather Workers =

The International Federation of Boot and Shoe Operatives and Leather Workers was a global union federation representing unions of shoemakers and leather workers, principally in Europe.

== History ==
An International Federation of Boot and Shoe Operatives was founded in 1889 in Paris, while the International Workers Congress was underway. It was headquartered in Zurich, and led by a secretary named Martens. It achieved an agreement between unions in several countries that shoemakers who travelled to another country would have their membership benefits honoured, and some support was given to major industrial actions. But most of the member unions took little interest in the federation. It was moribund from 1897, and dissolved in 1900.

In 1907, a conference in Stuttgart agreed to establish a new federation of the same name. Led by Josef Simon, it was based in Nuremberg. In 1919, it renamed itself as the International Union of Boot and Shoe Operatives, Leather, Skin and Hide Workers. In 1921, the International Federation of Saddlers' Unions and the International Union of Leather Workers merged in, and the federation became the "International Federation of Boot and Shoe Operatives and Leather Workers". By 1925, it had 26 affiliates, with a total of 357,504 members.

In 1933, due to the rise to power of the Nazis, the federation's headquarters were moved to London, and George Chester took over as general secretary. It became moribund during World War II, but in 1946, was reconstituted as the International Shoe and Leather Workers' Federation (ISLWF).

The federation merged in 1970 with the International Textile and Garment Workers' Federation, forming the International Textile, Garment and Leather Workers' Federation.

== Affiliates ==
In 1960, the following unions were affiliated to the federation:

| Union | Country | Affiliated membership |
|---|---|---|
| Australian Boot Trade Employees' Federation | Australia | 23,000 |
| Danish Shoemakers' Union | Denmark | 5,600 |
| Danish Tanners' Union | Denmark | 860 |
| Federation of Hides, Leather, and Kindred Trades | France | 3,500 |
| Federation of Leather Workers | Greece | 6,000 |
| General Union | Belgium | 6,500 |
| General Union of Miscellaneous Industries | Netherlands | 1,440 |
| Glovemakers' Union of Denmark | Denmark | 230 |
| Irish Shoe and Leather Workers' Union | Ireland | 4,272 |
| United Italian Federation of Clothing Workers | Italy | 6,424 |
| Leather Union | West Germany | 90,300 |
| National Federation of the Shoe Industry | Cuba | 1,672 |
| National Union of Boot and Shoe Operatives | United Kingdom | 77,417 |
| National Union of Leather Workers | South Africa | 8,000 |
| New Zealand Federated Footwear Trade Union | New Zealand | 3,544 |
| Norwegian Union of Shoe Makers | Norway | 4,248 |
| Norwegian Union of Hide and Leather Workers | Norway | 1,550 |
| Rossendale Union of Boot, Shoe and Slipper Operatives | United Kingdom | 7,190 |
| Swedish Saddlemakers' and Upholsterers' Union | Sweden | 1,393 |
| Swedish Shoe and Leather Workers' Union | Sweden | 10,500 |
| Swiss Clothing, Leather and Equipment Workers' Union | Switzerland | 3,000 |
| Transvaal Leather and Allied Trades Industrial Union | South Africa | 3,000 |
| United Unions | Sweden | 4,342 |
| Upholsterers' Union of Denmark | Denmark | 1,000 |
| Union of Textile, Clothing and Leather Workers | Austria | 13,000 |

== General Secretaries ==
1907: Josef Simon
1933: George Chester
1949: James Crawford
1957: Sydney Robinson
