= Josef Simon (trade unionist) =

German trade unionist and politician

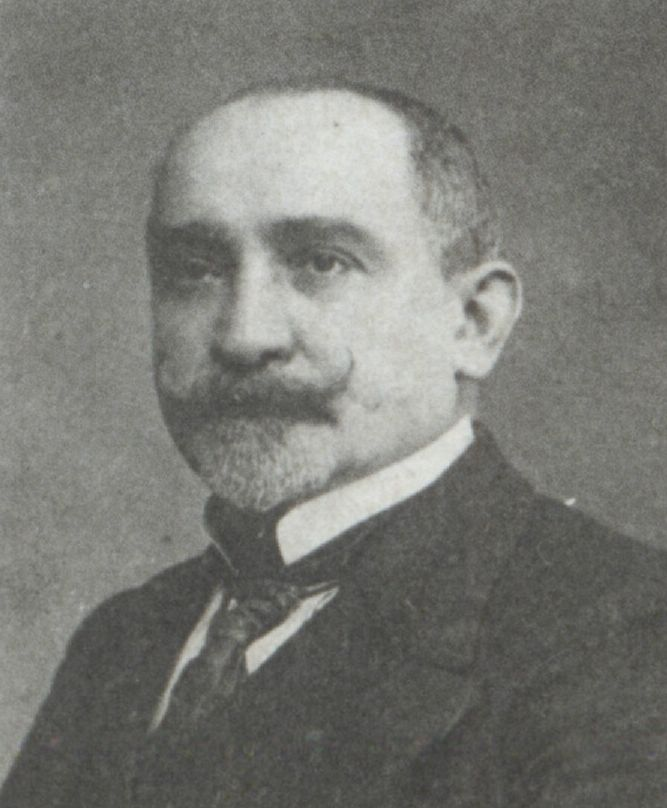
Simon in 1912

Josef Simon (23 May 1865 – 1 April 1949) was a German trade unionist and politician.

Born in Schneppenbach, Kingdom of Prussia, Simon completed an apprenticeship as a shoemaker, and worked in a factory. In 1885, he heard Wilhelm Liebknecht speak, and was inspired to join the Social Democratic Party of Germany and the Support Association of German Shoemakers. Although, due to the Anti-Socialist Laws, this operated as a mutual benefit organisation rather than a trade union, Simon led a strike in Offenbach am Main later in the year. He was sacked for his trade union work on several occasions, but found work as a supervisor, and finally as managing director of a co-operative factory.

The Support Association openly became a trade union in 1890, and in 1894, Simon was elected as the chair of its executive committee. In 1900, he was elected as the union's president. He led the union through five difficult years of strikes, lock outs, and economic struggles, but was considered a success in the role, and remained in post. In 1904, the union became the Central Union of Shoemakers of Germany.

In 1907, the union led the formation of the International Federation of Boot and Shoe Operatives, and Simon became its first general secretary. That year, he was also elected to Nuremberg City Council, and the Bavarian Chamber of Deputies. In 1912, he was elected to the Reichstag, but in 1917, he left the SPD, joining the left-wing Independent Social Democratic Party of Germany (USPD). As a USPD member, he was elected to the Weimar National Assembly and the Weimar Reichstag, but he became associated with the right wing of the party, and in 1922, he rejoined the SPD. In 1919, he briefly served as the Bavarian Minister for Trade, Commerce and Industry, but resigned in protest at the government's backing for the Whites in the Russian Civil War.

In 1933, the Nazi government banned trade unions, and arrested Simon, taking him to Dachau concentration camp. He was released and engaged in underground trade union work, with Wilhelm Leuschner. In 1935, he was again arrested, taken to Dachau, and released after a few months. He survived the war, and in 1945, returned to local politics in Nuremberg. He also gave a speech at the founding conference of the new Leather Union, dying later in the event.

Trade union offices
Preceded by New position	General Secretary of the International Federation of Boot and Shoe Operatives; 1907–1933	Succeeded by George Chester
