= Len Smith (trade unionist) =

Leonard Smith (1879 – 1964) was a British trade unionist and politician.

Smith joined the National Union of Boot and Shoe Operatives (NUBSO) in 1897, and became very active in the union. In 1905, he was one of a group of union members who marched to London in support of a fair wage clause being added to the contract to make boots for the British Army.

Smith was also active in politics, and was first elected to Long Buckby Parish Council in 1898. By the 1920s, he was supportive of the Labour Party, and the union sponsored his candidacy for the party in Wells at the 1922 United Kingdom general election. He took third place, with 18.9% of the vote. He also stood in the 1931 United Kingdom general election, in Stafford, taking second place with a 31.9% vote share.

In 1923, Smith was appointed as a full-time national organiser for NUBSO. He relocated to Northampton, and was soon elected to its town council. In 1938, he was elected as the union's general president, serving until his retirement in 1944. In 1949–1950, he was Mayor of Northampton.

Trade union offices
| Preceded by W. R. Townley | General President of the National Union of Boot and Shoe Operatives; 1938–1944 | Succeeded by James Crawford |
Civic offices
| Preceded by Harriett M. Nicholls | Mayor of Northampton; 1949–1950 | Succeeded by Cyril A. Chown |
