= Northamptonshire Central Library =

Public library in Northampton, England

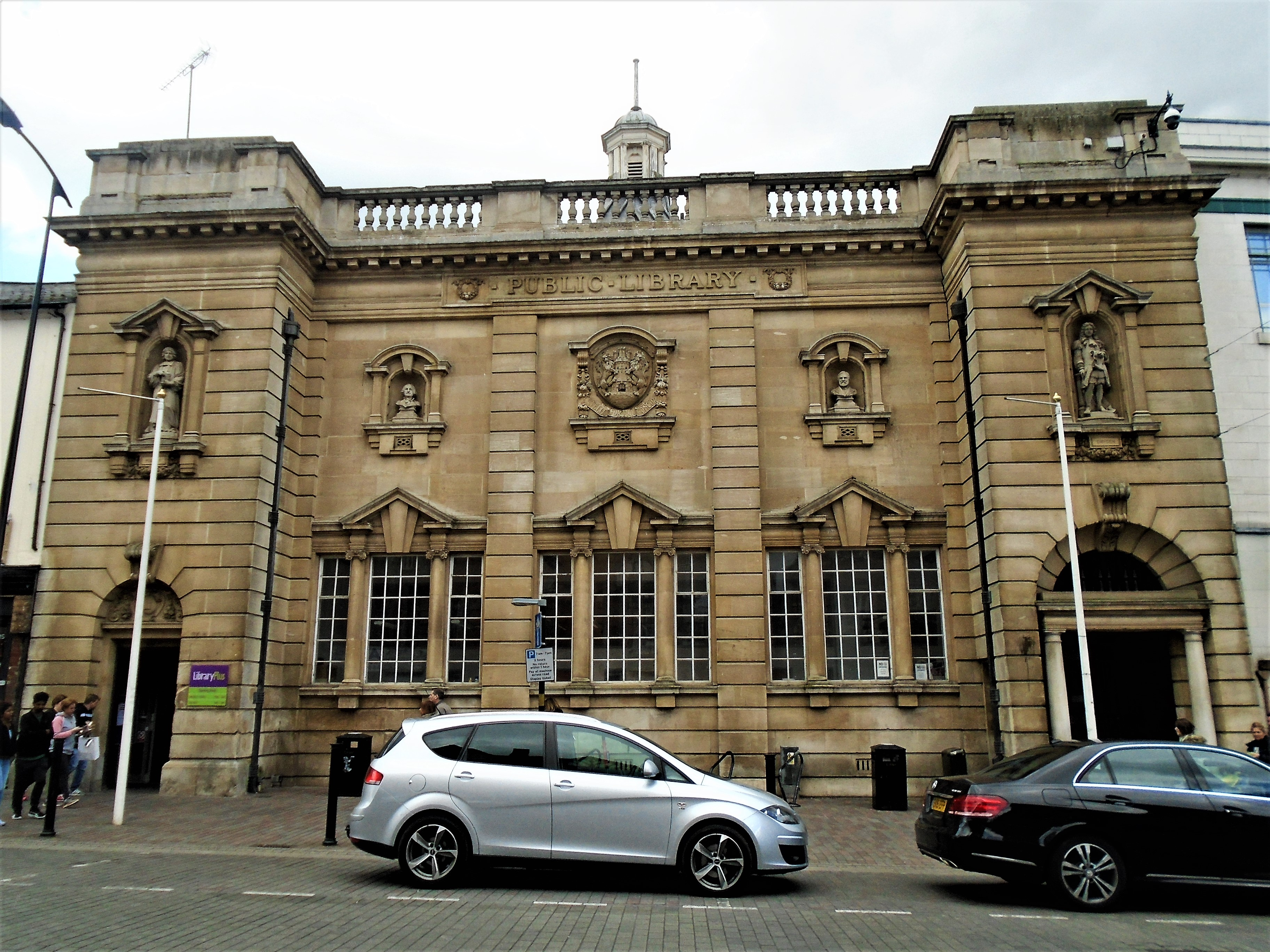
- Entrance to Northamptonshire Central Library
- 52.2386°N 0.8916°W
- Location: Abington Street, Northampton, NN1 2BA, England
- Type: Public library
- Established: 1876; 150 years ago (library service); 9 June 1910; 116 years ago (present building)
- Branch of: West Northamptonshire library service

Other information
- Affiliation: Business & IP Centre National Network
- Website: www.westnorthants.gov.uk/list-libraries/northamptonshire-central-library

Northamptonshire Central Library, also known as Northampton Central Library, is a public library in Abington Street, Northampton, England. It is the principal library of the West Northamptonshire Council library service and occupies a purpose-built Grade II listed building of 1910 funded in part by the industrialist and philanthropist Andrew Carnegie.

As well as lending and reference collections, the library houses the "Discover" local and family history collection, the county registration service, and the hub of the Business & IP Centre Northamptonshire. A phased programme of refurbishment, including the creation of a family hub, began in June 2026.

== History ==
=== Origins ===
The library traces its origins to the Northampton Mechanics' Institute, established in George Row in 1832. By 1876 the institute was in financial difficulty and its collection of books was transferred to the town to form the nucleus of a public library, initially accommodated in the Town Hall.

In 1884 the library moved, together with the town's museum, into the former county gaol in Guildhall Road, which the borough had bought and converted for the purpose. The stock was enlarged in 1885 by the acquisition of the library of the Religious and Useful Knowledge Society, founded in 1839, and by a collection of Northamptonshire books bought by public subscription. A new wing was added in 1889, and open access to the shelves was introduced in 1901.

=== The Abington Street building ===
A grant of £15,000 from Andrew Carnegie paid for a new purpose-built library in Abington Street. It was designed by the local architect Herbert Norman and built by the contractor A. A. Clarke, and was opened on 9 June 1910 by Alderman H. Butterfield, the Mayor. A children's library followed in 1912, among the earliest such departments to be provided in a public library.

The building was refurbished during the 1960s and again in the 1980s, and was designated a Grade II listed building on 9 January 1975 under the name Northampton Public Library. A further refurbishment took place in 2009, and the county registration service moved into the building in 2015.

=== Governance and the 2018 library review ===
Responsibility for the library later passed from the borough to Northamptonshire County Council, and from 2016 parts of the service were delivered on the council's behalf by the social enterprise First for Wellbeing. In February 2018, following the issue of a Section 114 notice amid the county council's financial crisis, the authority voted to withdraw funding from 21 of its 38 libraries; the Central Library was among those to be retained. In August 2018 the High Court held in R (WX and Connolly) v Northamptonshire County Council that the decision had been taken unlawfully, because the council had not properly considered its duty under the Public Libraries and Museums Act 1964 to provide a comprehensive and efficient service. Since the abolition of the county council in 2021, the library has been run by West Northamptonshire Council.

=== 2026 refurbishment ===
In June 2026 West Northamptonshire Council began a phased, twelve-month refurbishment of the building, with the library and registration service remaining open throughout. The first phase covered roof repairs to address persistent leaks and the restoration of the first-floor Carnegie Room. The wider programme includes an evacuation lift, upgraded toilets, an additional registrar's office, redecoration of public areas, a redesigned children's library and a new family hub with therapy rooms and a sensory space, with completion expected in spring 2027.

== Architecture ==
The library is a two-storey building with a basement and a classical stone front; its interior features a marble staircase and a well plan. The words "Public Library" are carved across the top of the façade, and the frontage carries statues of John Dryden, Thomas Fuller, George Washington and Andrew Carnegie, the last making it one of the few Carnegie libraries to include a likeness of its benefactor in its external decoration.

== Services and collections ==
The library provides lending and reference collections, public computers and Wi-Fi, study space and a children's library, and hosts community activities and events.

The basement houses "Discover", the local and family history collection, which holds newspapers, maps, photographs and printed sources for Northamptonshire, including material relating to the poet John Clare. The library is recorded as an archive repository by The National Archives under ARCHON code 442, with holdings connected to figures such as Clare, H. E. Bates, Philip Doddridge and the topographer George Baker.

The building is the main centre of the Business & IP Centre Northamptonshire, part of the British Library's Business & IP Centre National Network, which offers free market research and intellectual property resources, workshops and one-to-one advice to entrepreneurs and small businesses, with satellite "BIPC Local" points at Brixworth, Kettering, Towcester and Wellingborough libraries.

== See also ==
- List of Carnegie libraries in Europe
- Northampton Museum and Art Gallery
- Listed buildings in Northampton
