= Edward Kell =

British trade unionist and politician

Edward Kell (c.1831 – 1908) was a British trade unionist and politician.

Kell worked in Leicester as a shoe rivetter, and was an early member of the National Union of Boot and Shoe Rivetters and Finishers. In 1878, he was elected as the union's first president, working on a part-time basis.

Kell was also interested in politics, seeing himself as part of the Radical tradition in the Liberal Party. He was elected to the Leicester School Board, working with George Sedgwick to campaign against children being forced to work at home. He was later also elected to Leicester Town Council.

By the late 1880s, Kell was unhappy with the rise of socialism in the union. He gave a speech early in 1890, denouncing militancy among its members. Later in the year, the union refused to increase his salary, so he resigned and began running a business.

Trade union offices
Preceded by New position	President of the National Union of Boot and Shoe Rivetters and Finishers; 1878–1890	Succeeded by T. Horrabin
