= W. Boyd Hornidge =

British trade unionist

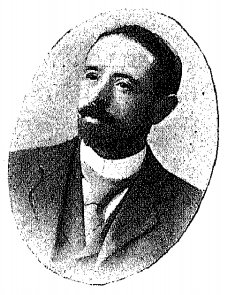
Hornidge in 1901

William Boyd Hornidge (16 September 1856 – January 1909) was a British trade unionist.

Born in London, Hornidge left school before the age of nine. In 1876 he became a laster, joining the National Union of Boot and Shoe Riveters and Finishers (NUBSRF), and serving on its London branch committee. However, he struggled to find work an, in search of employment, he moved to Northampton. He became President of its local branch in 1891 and, two years later, was elected General President of the national union. He was known for his commitment to liberalism, and focussed on arbitration as a solution to industrial disputes. He was also active in the National Secular Society.

In 1899, Hornidge narrowly beat Thomas Frederick Richards to become the General Secretary of the renamed National Union of Boot and Shoe Operatives, and he served as President of the Trades Union Congress in 1903. However, he suffered increasingly from bronchial asthma, found difficulty in fulfilling his duties, and was asked to stand down from his union office in late 1908. He died a few months later, aged 52.

Trade union offices
Preceded by John Judge	General President of the National Union of Boot and Shoe Riveters and Finishers; 1893–1899	Succeeded by Charles Freak
Preceded by William Inskip	General Secretary of the National Union of Boot and Shoe Operatives; 1899–1908	Succeeded by Edward L. Poulton
Preceded by W. C. Steadman	President of the Trades Union Congress; 1903	Succeeded by Richard Bell
