= Lambert Ward =

British politician

Sir Albert Lambert Ward Bt CVO DSO TD DL
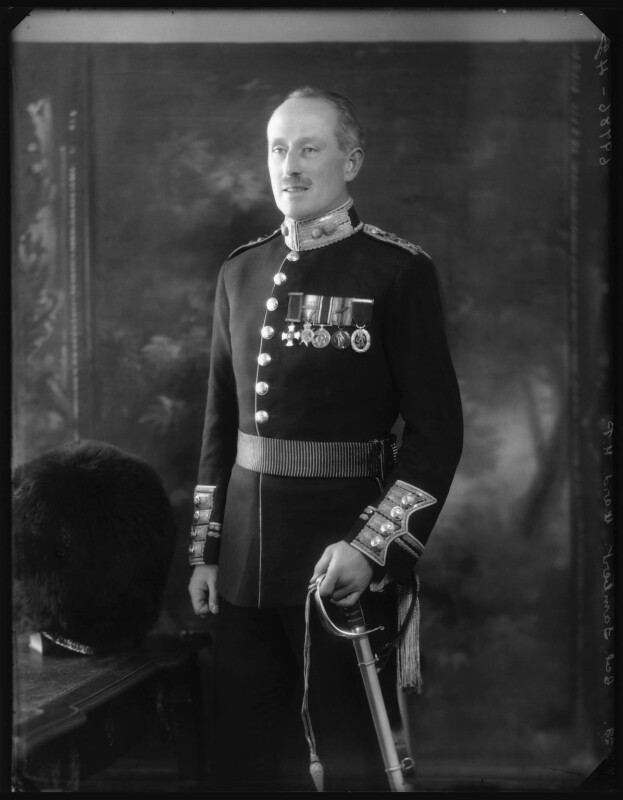

Member of Parliament for Kingston upon Hull North West
- In office 14 December 1918 – 15 June 1945
- Preceded by: New constituency
- Succeeded by: Kim Mackay

Vice-Chamberlain of the Household
- In office 1935–1935
- Preceded by: Sir Victor Warrender
- Succeeded by: George Davies

Comptroller of the Household
- In office 1935–1937
- Preceded by: George Bowyer
- Succeeded by: George Davies

Treasurer of the Household
- In office 1937–1937
- Preceded by: Sir Frederick Penny
- Succeeded by: Arthur Hope

Personal details
- Born: 7 November 1875
- Died: 21 October 1956 (aged 80)
- Party: Conservative

Sir Albert Lambert Ward, 1st Baronet, CVO, DSO, TD, DL (7 November 1875 – 21 October 1956) was a volunteer soldier in the Territorial Force and a Conservative Party politician in the United Kingdom.

Ward was an officer of the Honourable Artillery Company, he was commissioned a second lieutenant in 1902. He was promoted to lieutenant in 1904. He was still a captain at the formation of the Territorial Force in 1908, and was promoted to captain in 1913. He fought in World War I, soon being promoted to temporary Major and ultimately rising to the (substantive) rank of lieutenant colonel.

In 1916, he commanded the Howe Battalion of the Royal Naval Division. After the war he continued as an officer, initially reverting to the rank of major. He was awarded the Territorial Decoration TD in 1919. He was re-promoted to Lieutenant-Colonel in 1924 (re-gaining his former seniority), commanding the unit for a period up to 1928. He was given a brevet (military) promotion to colonel in 1927. In 1931 he was made Honorary Colonel of the 50th (Northumbrian) Divisional Train in the Royal Army Service Corps.

He contested Hull West for the Conservatives at the December 1910 general election, but was not elected. However, he was returned at the 1918 general election as the Member of Parliament (MP) for Kingston upon Hull North West, and held the seat until his defeat in the Labour Party landslide at the 1945 election. He served under Ramsay MacDonald as a Lord of the Treasury from 1931 to 1935 and as Vice-Chamberlain of the Household in 1935, under Stanley Baldwin as Vice-Chamberlain of the Household in 1935 and as Comptroller of the Household from 1935 to 1937 and under Neville Chamberlain as Treasurer of the Household in 1937. He was a member of the national council of The Link, a pro-Nazi organization.

Ward was made a Baronet, of Blyth in the County of Northumberland, in the 1929 King's Birthday Honours. He was made a Commander of the Royal Victorian Order in 1937. In 1946 he was appointed a Deputy Lieutenant for the County of London.

== Family ==
He was the son of Albert Bird Ward (1840–?) and Louisa Emma (Lambert) Ward (1845–?), his sister, Louisa Isabel Ward (1872–1969), married John Edward Thornycroft.

In 1920, he married Constance Vivian (née Tidmas; 1890–1976). Their daughter, Diana Josephine Lambert Ward (1921–2004), Lady Spearman, was the second wife of Sir Alexander Cadwallader Mainwaring Spearman.

== Footnotes ==
Parliament of the United Kingdom
| New constituency | Member of Parliament for Kingston upon Hull North West; 1918–1945 | Succeeded by Kim Mackay |
Political offices
| Preceded by Sir Victor Warrender | Vice-Chamberlain of the Household; 1935 | Succeeded by George Davies |
| Preceded by George Bowyer | Comptroller of the Household; 1935–1937 | Succeeded by George Davies |
| Preceded by Sir Frederick Penny | Treasurer of the Household; 1937 | Succeeded by Arthur Hope |
Baronetage of the United Kingdom
| New creation | Baronet (of Blyth); 1929–1956 | Extinct |
