= James Crawford (trade unionist) =

Scottish trade unionist (1896–1982)

James Crawford (1 August 1896 – 15 July 1982) was a Scottish trade unionist.

Crawford attended Carrick Academy in Maybole before serving in World War I, with both the Highland Light Infantry, and the Cameronians. He joined the Labour Party, serving on Glasgow City Council from 1930 until 1938. At the 1935 United Kingdom general election, he stood unsuccessfully in Kilmarnock.

Crawford was active in the National Union of Boot and Shoe Operatives (NUBSO), and was elected as its President in 1944. He became known as an expert on automation, and he led policy development on this across the entire trade union movement once he was elected to the General Council of the Trades Union Congress in 1949. In 1950, he was appointed to the Advisory Council of the Department of Scientific and Industrial Research, and from 1955 served on the British Productivity Council. He joined the National Coal Board as a part-time member in 1956 then, the following year, resigned all his existing positions to become a full-time member, with special responsibility for industrial relations. His appointment was unpopular with the National Union of Mineworkers and the National Association of Colliery Overmen, Deputies and Shotfirers, who had hoped one of their own officials would win the role.

Crawford retired in 1962, and was succeeded on the National Coal Board by Bill Webber.

Trade union offices
Preceded by Len Smith	President of the National Union of Boot and Shoe Operatives; 1944–1957	Succeeded by Sydney Robinson
Preceded by George Chester	Boot, Shoe and Leather Group representative on the General Council of the TUC; 1949–1957	Succeeded by Lionel Poole
Preceded by George Chester	General Secretary of the International Shoe and Leather Workers' Federation; 1949–1957	Succeeded by Sydney Robinson
