= Sydney Robinson (trade unionist) =

Former British trade unionist

Sydney Allen Robinson (13 August 1905 – 10 April 1978) was a British trade unionist.

Robinson grew up in Clophill in Northamptonshire before becoming a shoemaker. He joined the National Union of Boot and Shoe Operatives (NUBSO), and became a full-time officer in 1939, national organizer in 1947, and Assistant General Secretary in 1949.

In 1957, Robinson was elected as General President of NUBSO, and he won a place on the General Council of the Trades Union Congress (TUC) two years later. In 1966, he was appointed to the Monopolies and Mergers Commission, and this became his main focus after his retirement from his trade union posts in 1970. In 1972, he was also appointed to the TUC-CBI Conciliation Panel, and he remained active until his death in 1978 at the age of 72.

Trade union offices
| Preceded by James Crawford | President of the National Union of Boot and Shoe Operatives; 1957–1970 | Succeeded by Position vacant? |
| Preceded by James Crawford | General Secretary of the International Shoe and Leather Workers' Federation; 1957–1970 | Succeeded by Federation merged |
| Preceded by Lionel Poole | Boot, Shoe and Leather Group representative on the General Council of the TUC; 1959–1970 | Succeeded by Merged into Clothing Group |
