= James Baum =

Scottish trade unionist and socialist activist

James Henry Baum (18 December 1878 – 20 February 1936) was a Scottish trade unionist and socialist activist.

Born in Dalbeattie in Scotland, Baum's father died while working in a quarry while James was young, and he was instead brought up by his grandfather, in Mountsorrel in Leicestershire. His grandfather had been a Chartist, and this interest in radical politics led James to join the Independent Labour Party (ILP) in 1900.

Baum worked as a clicker in the shoemaking trade for many years. He received much of his education from the Working Men's College, and then through university extension programmes. He later lectured in adult education classes, and was a founding member of the Workers' Educational Association.

Baum joined the National Union of Boot and Shoe Operatives (NUBSO) in 1896, and soon began representing it at Leicester Trades Council. In 1912, he was elected as secretary of the trades council, remaining in post until 1923. In 1925, he was appointed as NUBSO's full-time national organiser.

The ILP was affiliated to the Labour Party, and Baum acted as election agent to Alfred Hill and then Frederick Pethick-Lawrence in their campaigns in Leicester West. At the 1929 United Kingdom general election he stood in his own right in Nottingham East, with the sponsorship of NUBSO, and then at the 1931 United Kingdom general election he stood in Kingston upon Hull North West. He took second place on both occasions.

Baum died suddenly, while in a London hotel, in February 1936.
