= Bethnal Green North East (London County Council constituency) =

London County Council constituency

- Former constituency for the London County Council

Former constituency
- Created: 1889; 136 years ago
- Abolished: 1949; 76 years ago
- Member(s): 2
- Replaced by: Bethnal Green

Bethnal Green North East was a constituency used for elections to the London County Council between 1889 and 1949. The seat shared boundaries with the UK Parliament constituency of the same name.

== Councillors ==
Year	Name	Party	Name	Party
1889	James Fenning Torr	Progressive	Walter Wren	Progressive
1892	James Fenning Torr	Progressive	Charles Freak	Labour Progressive
1895	Cosmo Rose-Innes	Moderate	Charles Freak	Labour Progressive
1898	Edwin Cornwall	Progressive	Charles Freak	Labour Progressive
1901	Edwin Cornwall	Progressive	Edward Smith	Progressive
1910	Garnham Edmonds	Progressive	Edward Smith	Progressive
1922	Edgar Bonham-Carter	Progressive	William Shadforth	Progressive
1925	George Belt	Labour	Henry Talbot Macdonald	Labour
1928	Eleanor Nathan	Liberal	Richard Edward Pearson	Liberal
1934	Thomas Dawson	Labour	Rachel Keeling	Labour
1941	Thomas Dawson	Labour	Wyndham Deedes	Labour
1946	Helen Bentwich	Labour	Ronald McKinnon Wood	Labour

== Election results ==
1889 London County Council election: Bethnal Green North East
Party	Candidate	Votes	%	±%
Progressive	James Fenning Torr	1,740		
Progressive	Walter Wren	1,709		
Moderate	Theodore Lumley	1,456		
Independent	William Wright	718		
Liberal Unionist	James Bishop	484		
Progressive	James Milbourne	401		
Progressive win (new seat)				
Progressive win (new seat)				

1892 London County Council election: Bethnal Green North East
Party	Candidate	Votes	%	±%
Labour Progressive	Charles Freak	2,361		
Progressive	James Fenning Torr	2,298		
Moderate	Beaufoi Moore	1,551		
Moderate	Thomas Watson Francis	1,544		
Progressive hold		Swing		
Progressive hold		Swing		

1895 London County Council election: Bethnal Green North East
Party	Candidate	Votes	%	±%
Progressive	Charles Freak	1,828		
Progressive	James Fenning Torr	1,822		
Moderate	Cosmo Rose-Innes	1,059		
Moderate	A. W. H. Hay	1,050		
Progressive hold		Swing		
Progressive hold		Swing		

1898 London County Council election: Bethnal Green North East
Party	Candidate	Votes	%	±%
Progressive	Charles Freak	2,733		
Progressive	Edwin Cornwall	2,580		
Moderate	J. A. Nix	1,611		
Moderate	Edward Sassoon	1,599		
Progressive gain from Moderate		Swing		
Progressive hold		Swing		

1901 London County Council election: Bethnal Green North East
Party	Candidate	Votes	%	±%
Progressive	Edward Smith	3,030	36.3	
Progressive	Edwin Cornwall	2,963	35.5	
Conservative	Charles Thomas Bruce	1,181	14.2	
Conservative	Cartaret Fitzgerald Collins	1,169	14.0	
Progressive hold		Swing		
Progressive hold		Swing		

1904 London County Council election: Bethnal Green North East
Party	Candidate	Votes	%	±%
Progressive	Edward Smith	3,265		
Progressive	Edwin Cornwall	3,251		
Conservative	McCrae	1,211		
Conservative	Richard Storry Deans	1,163		
Progressive hold		Swing		
Progressive hold		Swing		

1907 London County Council election: Bethnal Green North East
Party	Candidate	Votes	%	±%
Progressive	Edwin Cornwall	3,877		
Progressive	Edward Smith	3,776		
Municipal Reform	R. A. Robinson	1,918		
Municipal Reform	L. H. Lemon	1,907		
Majority				
Progressive hold		Swing		
Progressive hold		Swing		

1910 London County Council election: Bethnal Green North East
Party	Candidate	Votes	%	±%
Progressive	Garnham Edmonds	3,423	36.6	
Progressive	Edward Smith	3,369	36.1	
Municipal Reform	Alexander Edwards	1,327	14.2	
Municipal Reform	William Long Restall	1,221	13.1	
Majority		2,042	21.9	
Progressive hold		Swing		
Progressive hold		Swing		

1913 London County Council election: Bethnal Green North East
Party	Candidate	Votes	%	±%
Progressive	Garnham Edmonds	2,731	29.4	−7.2
Progressive	Edward Smith	2,667	28.7	−7.4
Municipal Reform	G. Allen	1,961	21.1	+6.9
Municipal Reform	Thomas Andrew Blane	1,941	20.9	+7.8
Majority		706	7.6	−14.3
Progressive hold		Swing	-7.1	
Progressive hold		Swing		

1919 London County Council election: Bethnal Green North East
Party	Candidate	Votes	%	±%
Progressive	Edward Smith	Unopposed	n/a	n/a
Progressive	Garnham Edmonds	Unopposed	n/a	n/a
Progressive hold		Swing	n/a	
Progressive hold		Swing	n/a	

1922 London County Council election: Bethnal Green North East
Party	Candidate	Votes	%	±%
Progressive	Edgar Bonham-Carter	3,522		n/a
Progressive	William Shadforth	3,518		n/a
Labour	B. Gray	3,295		n/a
Labour	George Belt	3,154		n/a
Majority				
Progressive hold		Swing	n/a	
Progressive hold		Swing	n/a	

1925 London County Council election: Bethnal Green North East
Party	Candidate	Votes	%	±%
Labour	Henry Talbot Macdonald	3,912		
Labour	George Belt	3,808		
Progressive	Edgar Bonham-Carter	3,485		
Progressive	Richard Edward Pearson	3,382		
Majority				
Labour gain from Progressive		Swing		
Labour gain from Progressive		Swing		

1928 London County Council election: Bethnal Green North East
Party	Candidate	Votes	%	±%
Liberal	Richard Edward Pearson	5,577		
Liberal	Eleanor Nathan	5,524		
Labour	T. Stone	2,821		
Labour	George Belt	2,773		
Communist	Jim Bradley	1,238		
Communist	Minnie Birch	1,140		
Municipal Reform	James Alan Bell	975		
Municipal Reform	William Shadforth	896		
Majority				
Liberal gain from Labour		Swing		
Liberal gain from Labour		Swing		

1931 London County Council election: Bethnal Green North East
Party	Candidate	Votes	%	±%
Liberal	Eleanor Nathan	5,543		
Liberal	Richard Edward Pearson	5,401		
Labour	H. P. Wilson	3,878		
Labour	Rachel Keeling	3,809		
Majority				
Liberal hold		Swing		
Liberal hold		Swing		

1934 London County Council election: Bethnal Green North East
Party	Candidate	Votes	%	±%
Labour	Rachel Keeling	6,470		
Labour	Thomas Dawson	6,410		
Liberal	Eleanor Nathan	4,320		
Liberal	Richard Edward Pearson	4,223		
Independent	William Shadforth	159		
Majority				
Labour gain from Liberal		Swing		
Labour gain from Liberal		Swing		

1937 London County Council election: Bethnal Green North East
Party	Candidate	Votes	%	±%
Labour	Thomas Dawson	7,777		
Labour	Rachel Susanna Keeling	7,756		
British Union of Fascists	Alexander Raven Thomson	3,028		
British Union of Fascists	E. G. Clarke	3,022		
Liberal	Arthur Irvine	2,328		
Liberal	H. K. Sadler	2,298		
Majority				
Labour hold		Swing		
Labour hold		Swing		

1946 London County Council election: Bethnal Green North East
Party	Candidate	Votes	%	±%
Labour	Ronald McKinnon Wood	3,218		
Labour	Helen Bentwich	3,205		
Liberal	J. Ellis	1,679		
Liberal	R. H. Roberts	1,614		
Majority				
Labour hold		Swing		
Labour hold		Swing		
