= Edgar Bonham-Carter =

England international rugby union player & barrister

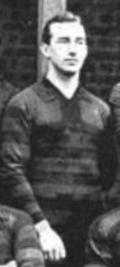
- With Blackheath F.C. in 1895
- Born: 2 April 1870; London, England
- Died: 24 April 1956 (aged 86); Alton, Hampshire, England
- Education: Clifton College; New College, Oxford
- Occupation(s): Barrister, administrator, rugby union player
- Spouse: Charlotte Helen Ogilvy (m. 1926)

Sir Edgar Bonham-Carter KCMG CIE (2 April 1870 – 24 April 1956) was a British barrister and administrator in Sudan and Iraq. In his younger days he was a rugby player of some note and represented England at international level.

== Early life and rugby career ==
Bonham-Carter was born in London on 2 April 1870, into the prominent Bonham Carter family, the son of the businessman and lawyer Henry Bonham Carter (Note: Although his father and some of his siblings spelt their surname without the hyphen, Edgar Bonham-Carter used it.) and his wife Sibella Charlotte (née Norman). He was educated at Clifton College and New College, Oxford, where he took second class honours in jurisprudence in 1892. While at Oxford Bonham-Carter played rugby union for the University team and won two sporting "Blues" in 1890 and 1891. While still at Oxford he was selected to play for the England national team, in the 1891 Home Nations Championship, against Scotland. This was his only international appearance, but he continued playing rugby after leaving university, joining Blackheath, before turning out for invitational tourists the Barbarians in 1892.

== Service in Sudan and Iraq ==
Bonham-Carter was called to the bar by Lincoln's Inn in 1895 and in 1899 was appointed Legal Secretary of the Sudan.

In Sudan, he had to devise an entirely new legal system, the criminal part of which was largely based on the Indian Penal Code. He held the post, latterly also an Official Member of the Council of the Governor-General of the Sudan, until 1919, when he was appointed Senior Judicial Officer of Mesopotamia (later Iraq), newly under British Mandate after long being a part of the Ottoman Empire. Here he also had to devise a new legal system, adapting the Ottoman system to fit in with modern British ideas of justice, but not imposing too many foreign ideas on the country's longstanding legal system.

While in Iraq, he interested himself in archaeology. At the request of the family of Gertrude Bell he became honorary secretary of the British School of Archaeology in Iraq, which he established on a firm basis. He was chairman of the school until 1950.

== Later life and death ==
On his retirement in 1921, he returned to England. He contested the London County Council election in 1922 as a Progressive candidate for Bethnal Green North East and was elected. He served for one three-year term.

He married Charlotte Helen Ogilvy in 1926.

From 1929 to 1939 he was chairman of First Garden City Ltd, which was responsible for the development of Letchworth and from 1940 to 1942 he was chairman of the National Housing and Town Planning Council. He was also a member of the council of the National Trust, which took up much of his time, and was president of the Commons Preservation Society. He was also a member of the council of the Royal Society for the Prevention of Cruelty to Animals.

Bonham-Carter was appointed Companion of the Order of St Michael and St George (CMG) in 1909, Companion of the Order of the Indian Empire (CIE) in 1919, and Knight Commander of the Order of St Michael and St George (KCMG) in the 1920 New Year Honours for his work in Iraq. He was also awarded the Ottoman Order of Osmanieh, third class, by the Khedive of Egypt in 1902, and the Egyptian Order of the Nile 1st Class in 1916.

He died in Alton, Hampshire on 24 April 1956.

Bonham-Carter's brothers included General Sir Charles Bonham Carter and the politician Sir Maurice Bonham Carter, who was the grandfather of the actress Helena Bonham Carter.

== See also ==
- Bonham Carter family
