= George Belt =

British politician

George Belt (1865 – 1930) was a British politician, who served on London County Council.

Born in Hull, Belt worked as a bricklayer, and also joined the Independent Labour Party, becoming a full-time organiser for the party. He was the election agent for Tom McCarthy in Kingston upon Hull West at the 1895 United Kingdom general election, and in 1896 he became deputy chairman of Hull Trades Council.

Belt married and had four children, but his wife did not share his interest in socialism, and the two grew apart. Around the end of the century, Belt began a relationship with Dora Montefiore. He suffered from a breakdown in 1899, and the relationship became public knowledge when he left hospital with Montefiore. Belt's wife complained to the ILP, which fired Belt. Belt later sued Margaret Ethel MacDonald over remarks she made about Montefiore in relation to this, with MacDonald's husband Ramsay settling the case out of court for £120.

Belt relocated to London, where he became an organiser for the Dock, Wharf, Riverside and General Labourers' Union. He was selected by the Hammersmith Trades and Labour Council as its candidate for Hammersmith, but Ramsay Macdonald still objected to Belt's relationship with Montefiore, and withheld the backing of the national Labour Representation Committee. Belt instead contested the seat as an independent labour candidate, taking third place with only 8.4% of the vote.

Belt later became secretary of the Herald League, which supported the Daily Herald. He remained active in the Labour Party, successor of the LRC, standing unsuccessfully in Bethnal Green North East at the 1922 London County Council election, and in The Hartlepools at the 1923 United Kingdom general election. In 1925 he was elected to London County Council, although he lost the seat three years later; he also failed to win Stone at the 1929 United Kingdom general election.
