= Edward L. Poulton =

British trade unionist

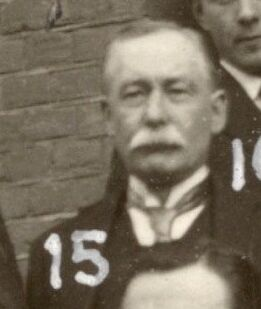
Edward L. Poulton in 1921

Edward Lawrence Poulton (25 November 1865 – 19 November 1937) was a British trade unionist.

Poulton was born in Northampton and worked making boots and shoes from an early age. He joined the National Union of Boot and Shoe Operatives (NUBSO) in 1887, and was appointed secretary of its Northampton branch four years later. He founded the Trade Union Club in the town in 1890, and was president of its trades council in 1892, using the opportunity to help found the Midland Federation of Trades Councils. He also became a Liberal-Labour politician, and was elected to Northampton's school board in 1895, then as an alderman on the council in 1898. In 1906, he became the first worker to serve as the mayor of Northampton.

Poulton (third from left) as part of a Trades Union Congress delegation to Downing Street in 1925

In 1908, Poulton was elected General Secretary of NUBSO, serving until 1930. He was awarded the OBE in 1917, and served on the Parliamentary Committee of the Trades Union Congress (TUC) from 1916, acting as its President in 1921. He was also active in the International Labour Office, serving as workers' vice-chairman from 1928 until 1931.

Trade union offices
Preceded by W. Boyd Hornidge	General Secretary of the National Union of Boot and Shoe Operatives; 1908–1930	Succeeded by George Chester
Preceded by New position	Boot, Shoe and Leather Group representative on the General Council of the TUC; 1921 – 1930	Succeeded by William R. Townley
Preceded by J. H. Thomas	President of the Trades Union Congress; 1921	Succeeded by Robert Barrie Walker
Preceded by J. H. Thomas and James Walker	Trades Union Congress representative to the American Federation of Labour; 1922; With: Herbert Smith	Succeeded by William C. Robinson and Robert Barrie Walker
