= W. R. Townley =

British trade unionist

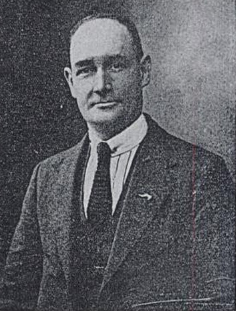
W. R. Townley in 1925

William Richard Townley (born 1877) was a British trade unionist.

Born in Northampton, Townley left school at the age of ten to work at an engineering firm, later moving to a boot-making company. He joined the National Union of Boot and Shoe Operatives (NUBSO), and became president of his branch of the union. During World War I, he sat on a military service tribunal, making decisions on exemptions from conscription. This created controversy when he came before the tribunal himself and was granted six months' exemption by his colleagues.

Townley was also active in the Labour Party, and was elected to Northampton Town Council, representing the North ward. He additionally served as a magistrate.

In 1929, Townley was elected as the president of NUBSO, and the following year, he was also elected to the General Council of the Trades Union Congress (TUC). He was the TUC's delegate to the American Federation of Labour in 1937, and retired later that year.

Trade union offices
Preceded by Thomas Frederick Richards	General President of the National Union of Boot and Shoe Operatives; 1929 – 1937	Succeeded by Len Smith
Preceded by Edward L. Poulton	Boot, Shoe and Leather Group representative on the General Council of the TUC; 1930 – 1937	Succeeded by George Chester
Preceded by George Gibson and William Kean	Trades Union Congress representative to the American Federation of Labour; 1937; With: John C. Little	Succeeded by Joseph Jones and John W. Stephenson
