= Daniel Merrick =

British trade unionist

Daniel Merrick (11 May 1827 – 19 February 1888) was a British trade unionist.

Born in Leicester, Merrick was educated at St Margaret's Charity School, then worked making stockings. He first came to prominence in the late 1840s, as a supporter of the Chartist movement. In 1858, he founded the Sock and Top Union, a small union representing framework knitters. Around this time, he became involved in a co-operative which Thomas Cook established to sell food, in Humberstone Gate. This proved short-lived, but from 1869 he was a leading figure in two successive Co-operative Hosiery Manufacturing Societies. He also served on the board of the Leicester Co-operative Society, becoming its secretary, and from 1885, its president.

In 1871, Merrick was elected to the Leicester School Board, as a Liberal-Labour candidate, with the backing of the new Democratic Association. He remained on the board until his death, campaigning for the board to establish more schools, and for it to withdraw funding from religious schools. This was soon followed by election to Leicester Town Council, the first worker to serve as a councillor in the town, elected only after supporters gave him £1,000 to ensure he met the necessary financial qualifications. He remained supportive of the Liberal Party, and at the 1885 UK general election he nominated Alexander McArthur for the Leicester constituency. He also supported the Nine Hour Movement, and as a Congregationalist, he opposed the opening of the city's museum and library on Sundays.

By 1870, membership of the Sock and Top Union had grown to 800, and in 1872, Merrick merged it into the new Leicester and Leicestershire Framework Knitters' Union. He also helped found the Leicester Trades Council, and became its first president. In 1877, he served as President of the Trades Union Congress, when it met in Leicester. In 1886, he became a justice of the peace, on the nomination of the trades council.

Trade union offices
Preceded by New position	President of the Leicester Trades Council; 1872–1884	Succeeded by Joseph H. Woolley
Preceded by James C. Laird	President of the Trades Union Congress; 1877	Succeeded by George Fowler Jones
