= John Spring (MP for Northampton) =

Member of the Parliament of England

John Spring (died 1435) was Bailiff of Northampton and twice Mayor of Northampton. He was also the Member of Parliament for Northampton.

Like other contemporary members of the Spring family, John Spring was a successful merchant in the cloth trade. This is shown in the alnage accounts for Northamptonshire drawn up in November 1395, which record that he paid the unusually high subsidy of 3s.1¼d. on cloth. As a result of this, Spring owned substantial lands in and around Northampton. He served as the Baliff of Northampton between 1392 and 1393 and was a tax collector for the county in 1398. He was elected Member of Parliament for the borough in 1399.

He was Mayor of Northampton between 1410 and 1411, and again between 1414 and 1416. During his second and third mayoralties respectively, Spring held the borough elections to the Parliaments of 1414 (November) and 1416 (March), and he later went surety for the attendance of the burgesses returned to the House of Commons in 1426.

Spring married Maud, the widow of Fremdoun de la Porte, in June 1408. He died in 1435, leaving one child, a daughter, Agnes.
