= Manfield and Sons =

British shoemaker

- Industry: Fashion
- Founded: 1844; 182 years ago in Northampton, England
- Founder: Philip Manfield
- Products: Shoes
- Website: manfield.com

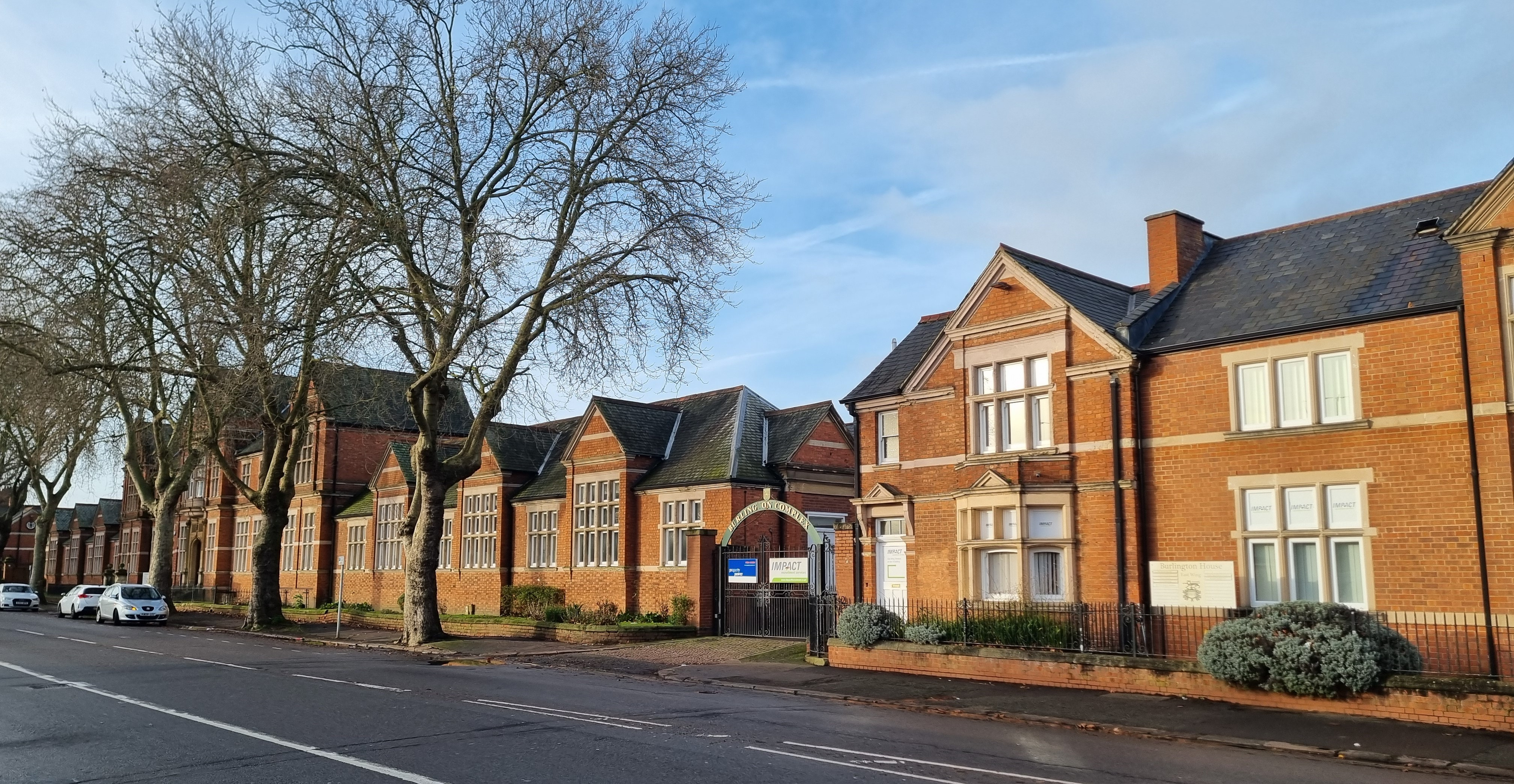
Burlington Complex and Burlington House in Northampton, formerly Manfield Shoe Factory

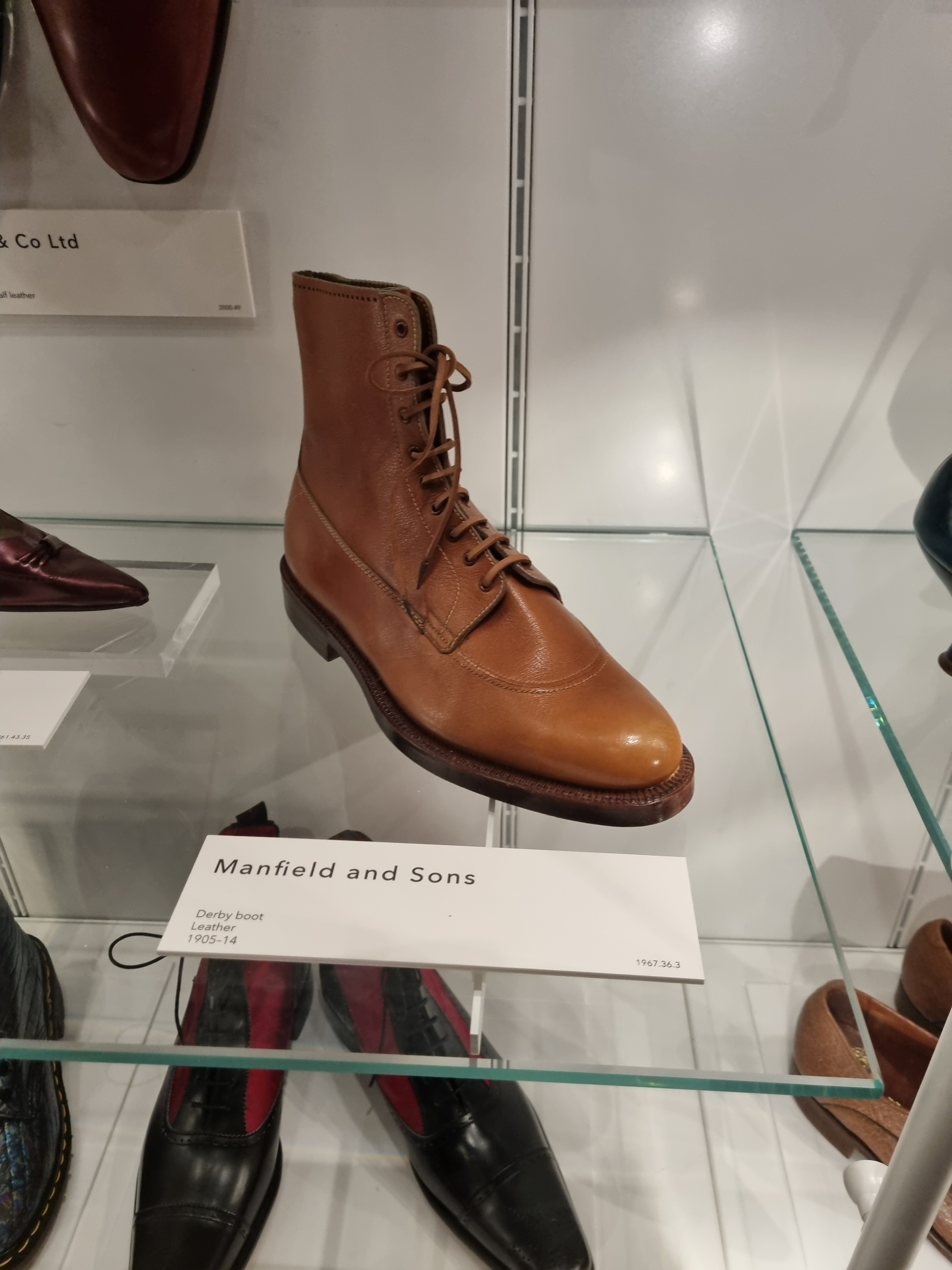
Manfield and Sons shoes in Northampton Museum and Art Gallery

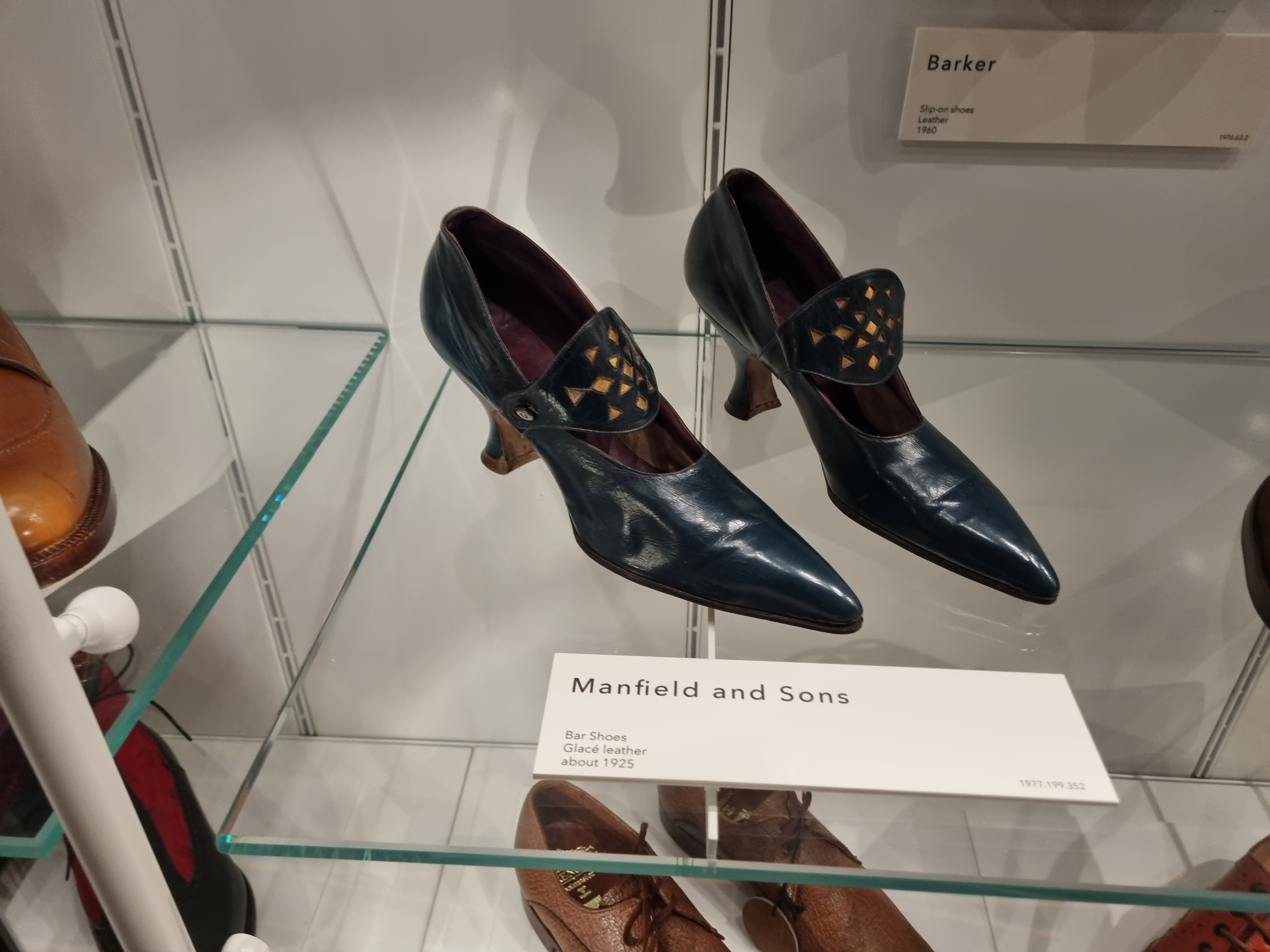
Manfield and Sons shoes in Northampton Museum and Art Gallery

Manfield and Sons or Manfield is an English shoemaker founded in 1844. Company was founded in Northampton, England by Philip Manfield.

== History ==
Philip Manfield moved from Bristol to Northampton in 1843 to manage a business that soon failed. In 1844, with the help of the local Unitarian church he opened his own shoe manufacturing business, Manfield and Sons, initially focusing on army contracts and the lower end of the market. Manfield opened first machine-based shoe factory in Northampton. The first shops operated by Manfield & Sons were called Cash & Co.

According to the census of 1851, Manfield was a ‘patent shoe manufacturer employing 200 hands’.

Between 1857 and 1859 company built a big warehouse on Campbell Square, Northampton with installed closing machinery, thus inaugurating the indoor factory system for boot and shoe making. This building was demolished in 1982.

In 1878 Philip Manfield's sons Harry (1855–1923) and James (1856–1925) entered into partnership with their father.

In December 1883 the shops were renamed Manfield & Sons.

By 1889, when the first Paris based branch opened, Manfield had 16 shops, some of which had been acquired from independent footwear retailers.

In 1892 Manfield built a new factory at Monks Park, Wellingborough Road.

The company became a listed company in 1950, at that time having 93 shops in the UK and a number abroad, including France, Belgium and the Netherlands.

In 1956 Manfield was acquired by Sears and became part of its British Shoe Corporation. In 1995 Manfield was handed over to Fascia, which went into administration in 1997. Manfield stores in the Netherlands were bought out by their management. Manfield brand continues to operate in Belgium, Germany and the Netherlands.

== Heritage ==
The former Manfield shoe factory in Wellingborough Road was listed grade II in 1976.

In 1925 James Manfield donated to the town a neo-Jacobean mansion at Weston Favell that was remodelled into Manfield Hospital for Crippled Children (later Manfield Orthopaedic Hospital). This closed in 1992 and was converted into apartments under the name Manfield Grange.
