= Terry Wire =

British politician

Mayor of Northampton
- In office 2003–2004

Personal details
- Born: March 2, 1941
- Died: May 14, 2014 (aged 73)
- Political party: Labour

Terence George Wire, known as Terry Wire, (2 Mar 1941 – 14 May 2014) was a local Labour politician in Northampton, England.

He was a member of the Labour party and was Mayor of Northampton for 2003–04. He served as a member of the Northamptonshire County Council and was Labour chief whip on both authorities, chairman of the county council and vice-chair of Northants Police Authority and deputy lieutenant in 2010.

Before becoming a politician he was member of the fire service.

He died from cancer in Cynthia Spencer Hospice for whom he had been a strong fund raiser over the years and he established the April Fools Harley Run which still runs to this day.
