= George Chester =

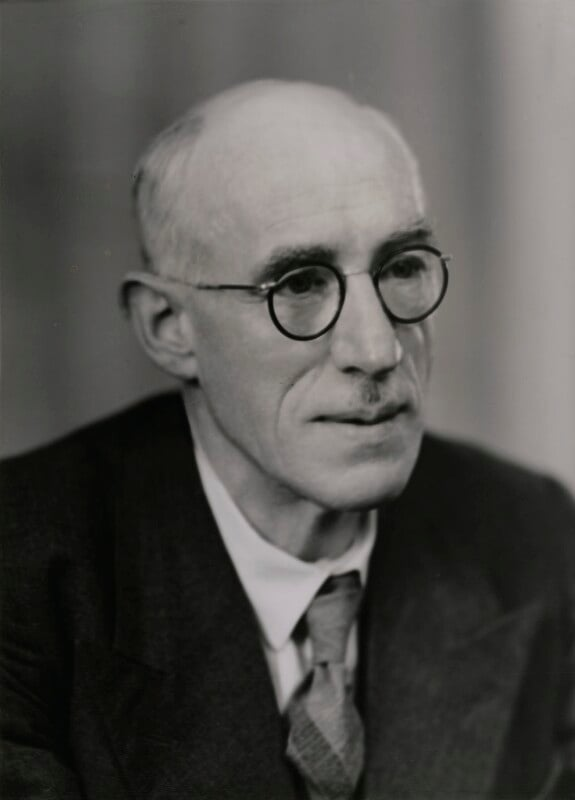
Chester in 1949

Sir George Chester CBE (16 January 1886 – 21 April 1949) was a British trade unionist.

Born in Loddington in Northamptonshire, Chester worked making boots from the age of thirteen. He joined the National Union of Boot and Shoe Operatives the following year, and from 1915 was assistant secretary of his branch. In 1930, he was elected as the union's general secretary, and in 1937 he was elected to the General Council of the Trades Union Congress (TUC).

It was at the TUC that Chester came to greatest prominence. Acknowledged as an expert on economic and educational matters, in 1942 he presented the TUC's "Education after the War" policy document, and he chaired the TUC's economic committee for several years.

In his spare time, Chester was a keen naturalist. He was secretary of the Kettering and District Naturalists' Society from 1908 to 1930 and, later in life, was made a Fellow of the Royal Horticultural Society.

Chester was made a knight bachelor in 1948, but died suddenly, early the following year.

Trade union offices
Preceded by Edward L. Poulton	General Secretary of the National Union of Boot and Shoe Operatives; 1930–1949	Succeeded by Lionel Poole
Preceded by Josef Simon	General Secretary of the International Federation of Boot and Shoe Operatives and Leather Workers; 1933–1949	Succeeded by James Crawford
Preceded by William R. Townley	Boot, Shoe and Leather Group representative on the General Council of the TUC; 1937–1949	Succeeded by James Crawford
