= European Parliamentary Union =

Private organization

The European Parliamentary Union (EPU) was a private organization set up by Richard von Coudenhove-Kalergi, who was also its Secretary General. It held its preliminary conference on 4–5 July 1947 at Gstaad, Switzerland, and followed it with its first full conference from 8 to 12 September.

Kalergi’s aim was to draft a European Constitution. The EPU asked some 4000 members of Parliament of 13 European countries to decide for or against a European Federation in the framework of the United Nations. The project was criticized by Denis de Rougemont and Duncan Sandys, son-in-law of Winston Churchill, founder of the European Movement, who advocated a model based on an intergovernmental co-operation without any loss of national sovereignty. The EPU played a prominent role in the Hague Congress, 7–10 May 1948.

The second EPU Congress was held from 1 to 5 September 1948 in Interlaken, Switzerland. On 20 September 1949, the EPU met for the third time in Venice and voted a resolution in favour of greater European political integration and an extension of the powers of the Consultative Assembly of the Council of Europe, which had just been established. In 1949, the British MP Kim Mackay became chair of the EPU. The creation of the Council of Europe resulted in a loss of influence for the EPU, since European parliaments now had their own intergovernmental forum in Strasbourg.

On 18 May 1950, Kalergi was the first person to be awarded the International Charlemagne Prize of the City of Aachen. In 19.-20 June 1950, Rheinfelden, Switzerland, the EPU organised a Conference of German and French Parliamentarians. Shortly afterwards, the EPU was merged with the European Movement. Kalergi was elected honorary president of the European Movement in 1952.
