= Kim Mackay =

Ronald William Gordon Mackay (3 September 1902 – 15 January 1960), known as Kim Mackay, was an Australian-born British Labour Party (and briefly Common Wealth Party) politician known for his European federalist views.

== Biography ==
Born in Bathurst, New South Wales, Mackay studied law and education at the University of Sydney. In 1926, he became a part-time history lecturer at St. Paul's College, and in 1932 he was a co-founder of the Australian Institute of Political Science, which argued for reform of the Australian Constitution.

Encouraged by Labour MP Stafford Cripps, Mackay moved to England in 1934 and began practicing law. He stood for the Frome constituency in the 1935 general election, losing by only 994 votes. In 1939, he took a post in the Ministry of Aircraft Production, where he became angered at Labour's reluctance to criticise government policy and resigned from the party. In 1941, he published Federal Europe, calling for a federation of Western European nations, claiming that this would facilitate socialism.

Mackay contested the 1942 Llandaff and Barry by-election as an "Independent Socialist" on the invitation of the 1941 Committee. Calling for an end to the UK National Government, claiming that this would result in the more effective prosecution of World War II, his campaign gained the support of the local Constituency Labour Party, but proved unsuccessful.

Mackay later supported Tom Driberg's successful campaign in the 1942 Maldon by-election, and in 1943, he joined the Common Wealth Party, which had been formed by the merger of the 1941 Committee with Forward March. This new party shared his views on European federalism, and Mackay was able to immediately become its Chair. He altered the party's structure in order for it to focus on fighting by-elections. This had considerable success, Common Wealth gaining three seats in the Parliament.

Mackay's position came under fire from several groups within Common Wealth. The London Region complained that he was a careerist and an anti-Marxist, while some Christians in the organisation argued that he was destroying the party's idealism in pursuit of electoralism.

Mackay became increasingly interested in electoral reform. In 1943, he published Coupon or Free?: Being a Study in Electoral Reform and Representative Government. He hoped that Common Wealth would be able to affiliate with Labour along with the Independent Labour Party and the Communist Party of Great Britain and act as a left-wing pressure group. In the event, these groups both applied to affiliate after 1945, but their applications were rejected. Unable to convince Common Wealth of his position, Mackay resigned in late 1944 and rejoined Labour.

Mackay stood for Hull North West at the 1945 general election and gained the seat for Labour. In Parliament, he argued for increased power for the United Nations. In 1945 he set up a Labour Europe Group in parliament, and in 1947, he joined the Keep Left faction.

In 1946, Mackay was a founder member of the European Union of Federalists, superseded two years later by the European Movement. Federalism was unpopular within his own party, which associated the idea with the Conservative Party and the Movement for a United Europe. In distinction to Mackay, they argued that a federal Europe should not contain communist states. In 1949, he became the chair of the European Parliamentary Union.

In 1950, Mackay's constituency was abolished, and he was instead elected for Reading North, but he lost this seat the following year. In 1953, he retired from politics due to ill health but continued to write articles in support of federalism.

Political offices
Preceded by Richard Acland	Chairman of the Common Wealth Party; 1943–1944	Succeeded by Richard Acland
Parliament of the United Kingdom
Preceded by Sir Lambert Ward, Bt.	Member of Parliament for Hull North West; 1945–1950	Constituency abolished
New constituency	Member of Parliament for Reading North; 1950–1951	Succeeded by Frederic Bennett
