= National Union of Boot and Shoe Operatives =

Former trade union in the United Kingdom

NUBSO
- National Union of Boot and Shoe Operatives
- Merged into: National Union of Footwear, Leather and Allied Trades
- Founded: 1873
- Dissolved: 1971
- Headquarters: The Grange, Earls Barton, Northamptonshire
- Location: United Kingdom
- Members: 100,000 (1920)
- Affiliations: TUC, ITUC, Labour, ISLWF

The National Union of Boot and Shoe Operatives (NUBSO) was a trade union in the United Kingdom which existed between 1873 and 1971. It represented workers in the footwear industry.

== History ==
The union was founded in 1873, when many riveters and finishers left the Amalgamated Society of Boot and Shoe Makers. They were dissatisfied by their low status within the old union, and instead formed the National Union of Boot and Shoe Rivetters and Finishers (NUBSRF). Membership in Leicester grew rapidly, with the next largest branches being Glasgow, London and Stafford. In total, by 1877, the union had about 4,000 members.

A few women joined the union in the late 1880s, making it the first union outside the textile trades to admit both men and women. At this point, membership in the important shoe making centre of Northampton was low, with only about 600 of 15,000 shoe workers in the town holding union membership. That year, a five-week lock-out of members resulted in a settlement favourable to the union. This brought in hundreds of new members, and by the end of the year, its national membership reached 10,000. The General Union of Clickers and Rough-stuff Cutters merged into the NUBSRF in 1892, but most of its members left again in 1895.

During the late 1880s and early 1890s, socialists came to prominence in the union. They led campaigns against sweatshop working and outworking, where people worked from their own homes and were paid by item completed. Under their influence, the union organised a 34-week strike in 1897, in support of a minimum wage and a 54-hour week, but this was unsuccessful.

In 1897, the union renamed itself as the "National Union of Boot and Shoe Operatives" and joined the General Federation of Trade Unions the following year. Membership rose over 100,000 by 1920, although it soon fell to around 80,000. Members in the Republic of Ireland left in 1953, to form the Irish Shoe and Leather Workers' Union.

A major decline in the British shoe-making industry led the union to merge with the Amalgamated Society of Leather Workers, the National Union of Glovers and Leather Workers and the National Union of Leather Workers and Allied Trades in 1971, forming National Union of Footwear, Leather and Allied Trades.

== Election results ==
The union was affiliated to the Labour Party, and sponsored numerous Parliamentary candidates, many of whom won election.

Election	Constituency	Candidate	Votes	% share	Position
1906 general election	Wolverhampton West	Thomas Frederick Richards	6,767	50.9	1
1910 Jan general election	Bristol East	Frank Sheppard	1,874	31.2	2
1910 Jan general election	Wolverhampton West	Thomas Frederick Richards	5,790	47.6	2
1918 general election	Wellingborough	Walter Smith	10,290	52.5	1
1922 general election	Eccles	John Buckle	14,354	51.4	1
1922 general election	Leicester West	Alfred Hill	12,929	45.0	1
1922 general election	Wellingborough	Walter Smith	11,057	42.4	2
1922 general election	Wells	Len Smith	4,048	18.9	3
1923 general election	Daventry	Len Smith	4,127	17.5	3
1923 general election	Eccles	John Buckle	12,267	42.7	1
1923 general election	Norwich	Walter Smith	20,077	20.9	1
1924 general election	Eccles	John Buckle	14,354	51.4	1
1924 general election	Norwich	Walter Smith	23,808	22.9	3
1929 general election	Altrincham	Alfred Dobbs	9,242	16.4	3
1929 general election	Frome	Frederick Gould	18,524	45.5	1
1929 general election	Norwich	Walter Smith	33,690	26.0	2
1929 general election	Nottingham East	James Baum	9,787	28.0	3
1929 general election	Stafford	Len Smith	10,011	36.6	2
1931 general election	Frome	Frederick Gould	17,748	41.7	2
1931 general election	Kingston upon Hull North West	James Baum	9,946	27.3	2
1931 general election	Leeds North East	Alfred Dobbs	10,294	24.5	2
1931 general election	Norwich	Walter Smith	28,295	21.0	3
1931 general election	Stafford	Len Smith	8,640	31.9	2
1935 general election	Kilmarnock	James Crawford	12,558	33.4	2
1935 general election	Leeds North East	Alfred Dobbs	14,080	35.2	2
1935 general election	Leicester East	Frederick Gould	17,532	42.6	2
1945 general election	Bosworth	Arthur Allen	26,151	55.6	1
1945 general election	Burton	Arthur W. Lyne	18,288	51.1	1
1945 general election	Harborough	Humphrey Attewell	23,353	42.5	1
1945 general election	Smethwick	Alfred Dobbs	20,522	65.9	1
1950 general election	Bosworth	Arthur Allen	29,282	53.6	1
1950 general election	Harborough	Humphrey Attewell	21,381	38.2	2
1951 general election	Bosworth	Arthur Allen	30,767	57.1	1
1966 general election	Bridgwater	Richard Mayer	17,864	38.1	2

== Leadership ==
=== General Secretaries ===
1874: Thomas Smith
1878: George Sedgwick
1886: William Inskip
1899: W. Boyd Hornidge
1908: Edward L. Poulton
1930: George Chester
1949: Lionel Poole
1960: Richard Gregson
1968: T. A. Moore

=== General Presidents ===
1878: Edward Kell
1890: T. Horrabin
1892: Jabez Leedham
1892: John Judge
1893: W. Boyd Hornidge
1899: Charles Freak
1910: Thomas Frederick Richards
1930: W. R. Townley
1938: Len Smith
1944: James Crawford
1957: Sydney Robinson
