= Lionel Poole =

British trade unionist

Sir Lionel Pinnock Poole (28 October 1894 – 13 January 1967) was a British trade unionist.

Poole was born in Wellingborough, Northamptonshire, to Levi Samuel Mitchell Poole and Lucy Poole. He came to prominence in the National Union of Boot and Shoe Operatives (NUBSO), becoming branch secretary, then in 1919 being chosen as its full-time national organiser. He was elected to its executive council in 1926, then in 1943 was elected as assistant general secretary and finally, in 1949, general secretary. In 1957, he was also elected to serve on the General Council of the Trades Union Congress (TUC).

Poole retired from his trade union posts in 1959, but took up positions on the boards of the British Overseas Airways Corporation and the Industrial Estates Management Corporation. In 1966, he received a knighthood.

Trade union offices
Preceded by George Chester	General Secretary of the National Union of Boot and Shoe Operatives; 1949 – 1959	Succeeded by Richard Gregson
Preceded by James Crawford	Boot, Shoe and Leather Group representative on the General Council of the TUC; 1957 – 1959	Succeeded by Sydney Robinson
