= Philip Manfield =

British shoe manufacturer and politician (1819–1899)

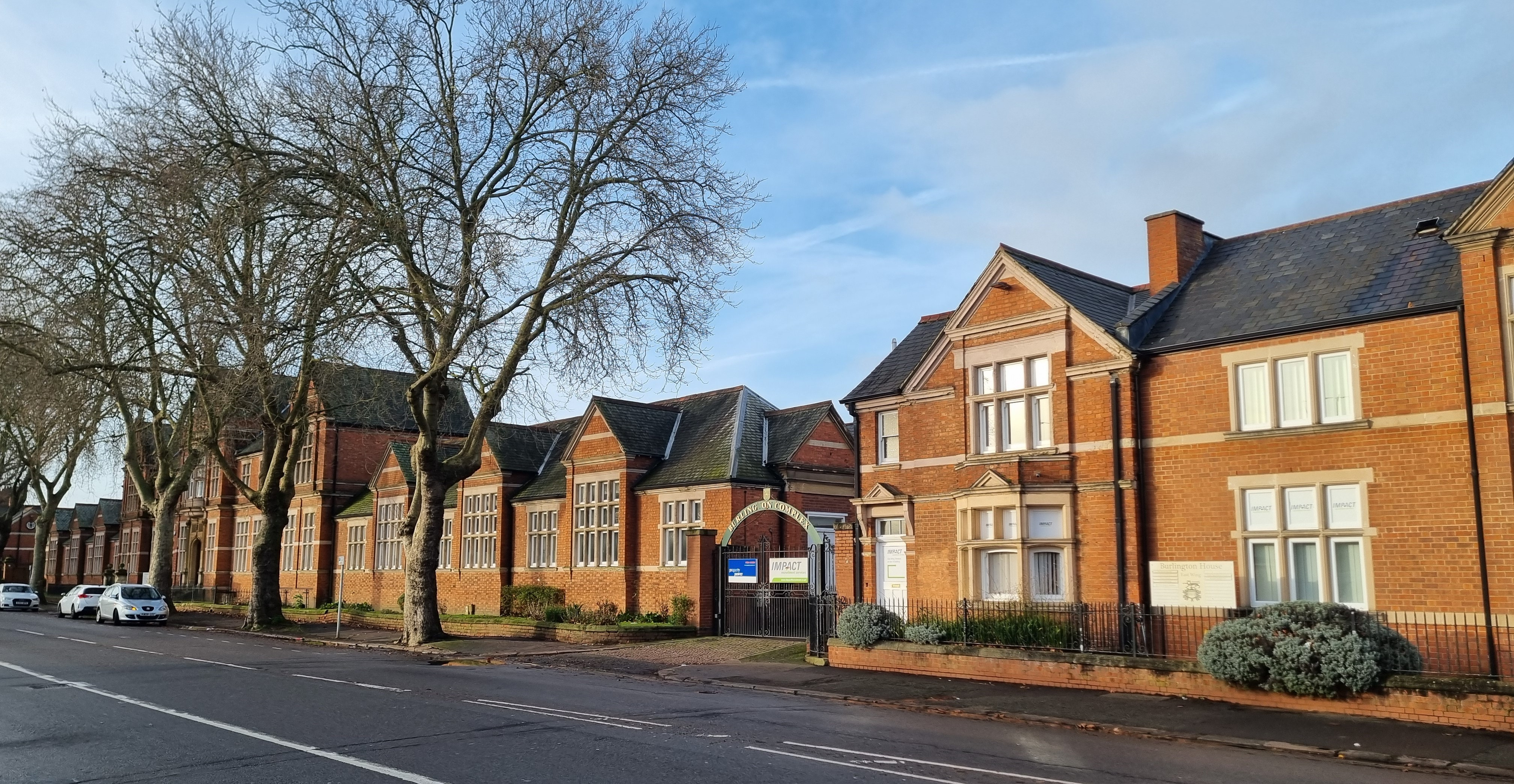
Burlington Complex and Burlington House, formerly Manfield Shoe Factory in Northampton

Sir Moses Philip Manfield JP (26 July 1819 — 31 July 1899) was an English shoe manufacturer and politician based in Northampton.

Manfield was born in Bristol, the son of Moses Philip Manfield, who was also a shoemaker. His childhood took place in a poor working-class family of Unitarians. After his father became ill, the family was supported by the efforts of his mother.

He was home educated by his mother until the age of 12; at this age he was apprenticed to a local boot closer. He rose through the business to become the manager

In 1843, he moved to Northampton to manage a business that soon failed. A year later, in 1844, with the help of the local Unitarian church he opened his own shoe manufacturing business, Manfield and Sons, initially focusing on army contracts and the lower end of the market. The business founded by Manfield grew to be a national business of shoemakers and retailers. The company became a listed company in 1950, at that time having 93 shops in the UK and a number abroad.

In 1845, he married Elizabeth Cambridge Newman with whom he had a daughter who died in infancy. Elizabeth died in 1852 and two years later he married Margaret Milne, with whom he had two sons. Manfield was prominent in local politics. He was a member of the Northampton Town Council for 22 years and became mayor of the city in 1894. He later an MP for the Northampton constituency. He was knighted in 1884.

Sir Philip died in Northampton at aged 80, nearly three weeks after the death of his second wife.
