= List of mayors of Northampton =

Mayor of Northampton
- Incumbent; Mike Hallam since 18 May, 2026
- Northampton Town Council
- Style: Mr. Mayor / Madam Mayor (informal)
- Seat: Northampton Guildhall
- Nominator: Northampton Town Council
- Term length: 1 year; renewable
- Constituting instrument: Charter of Northampton
- Inaugural holder: William Tilly (first recorded)
- Formation: 11 November 1189 (as reeve); 1215 (as mayor)
- Succession: Deputy mayor of Northampton
- Deputy: Deputy mayor of Northampton
- Website: www.northamptontowncouncil.gov.uk/mayoralcivic

This is a list of people recorded as the mayor of Northampton, the county town of the county of Northamptonshire, England, since the first recorded mayoralty in 1215. The mayor or Northampton is the third oldest mayoralty in the country. The current mayor for 2025/26 is Mike Hallam and is the 786th mayor overall.

== Mayor of Northampton ==
Under the Town Charter granted to Northampton in 11 November 1189, re-confirmed in 1200 and 1227, Northampton was given the right to elect a Reeve, an Anglo-Saxon role and the predecessor to the mayoralty. The change to the Anglo-Norman form of mayor was officially made in letters patent issued in 1252, but it probably took place unofficially as early as 1215, the year of the signing of Magna Carta, thus making Northampton the third place, with London, and York, to adopt the new term, therefore making Northampton the third oldest mayoralty in the country.

=== Term ===
Within the Liber Custumarium (the ancient book of the customs of Northampton), it was recorded in 1437 that mayors must wait 7 years before they may have another term.

In 1558 the Northampton Town Assembly confirmed the 7-year wait, adding a term limit of three terms, reduced to two terms in 1570. However, this limit had ceased to have been followed in the mid-15th century.

== List of mayors ==
The following is a list of mayors from the first recorded mayor. Of the known mayors, 15 have died in office, the last being Cllr Alwyn Jesse Hargrave in January 1995, and 3 have been deposed.

- 1215: William Tilly (1st recorded mayor of Northampton)
- 1227: Robert le Espicer
- 1229: Robert de Leycester
- 1233: Robert Ie Espicer
- 1249/50: Roger, son of Theobald
- 1254: Benedict Dod
- 1255: William Gangy
- 1256: Thomas Ken
- 1267: John le Moyne
- 1270: William Fitz Thomas
- 1271: John le Spicer
- 1273: John le Spicer
- 1274: William le Pessoner
- 1277: John de Staunford
- 1280: Robert fitz Henry
- 1282: Robert fitz Henry
- 1285: Philip de Horton
- 1286: Robert fitz Henry
- 1289: Robert fitz Henry
- 1290: John le Megre
- 1297: Pentecost de Kershallton
- 1300: Peter de Leycestre
- 1301–02: Pentecost de Kershallton
- 1303: Robert de Bedeford
- 1304: Pentecost de Kershallton
- 1305: John de Lungevil
- 1306: Alexander de Naylesworth
- 1307: Pentecost de Kershalton
- 1308: John de Staunford
- 1309: William de Tekne
- 1310–11: John de Staunford
- 1312: Alexander de Naylesworth
- 1313: Adam le Ayller
- 1314: William de Tekne
- 1315: Henry le Ayler (or le Garlekmonger)
- 1316: Henry le Garlekmonger
- 1317: Alexander de Naillesworth
- 1318: Alexander de Naillesworth and Philip de Caysho
- 1319–20: Walter de Burgo
- 1321: Kohn le Waydour
- 1322: Henry le Garlekmonger
- 1323: Robert le Rous
- 1324: Henry le Garlekmonger
- 1325: Robert le Rous
- 1326: Walter de Pateshull
- 1327: Simon de Levishull
- 1328–29: Walter de Burgh
- 1330: William le Widower
- 1331: William Elys
- 1332: Walter de Burgo
- 1333–34: John de Lungevil
- 1335: Adam de Cotesbrook
- 1336: Philip Everard
- 1337–39: Adam de Cotesbrook
- 1340: John de Longeville, Sr
- 1343: Thomas de Staunford
- 1349: Sir John de Vyneter
- 1349: (prior to): Adam le Garlekmongere
- 1357: William Wakelynge
- 1360–61: John de Getyngton
- 1367: William Wakelynge
- 1369–77: John de Getyngton
- 1378: John Shrovesbury
- 1379: John Haughton
- 1380: Simon Daventry
- 1381: Lawrence Haddon
- 1382: Thomas Wakelyne
- 1383: Thomas Sutton
- 1384: John Fox
- 1385: John Shrovesbury
- 1386: Simon Daventry
- 1387: John Grigge
- 1388: Henry Lavender
- 1389: Thomas Sprygy
- 1390: Simon Daventry
- 1391: Richard Spicer
- 1392: John Fox
- 1393: John Shrovesbury
- 1394: Thomas Wakelyne
- 1395: Henry Cayso
- 1396: John Shrovesbury
- 1397–98: William Shefford
- 1399–1400: John Fox
- 1401-02: John Loudham (MP for Northampton, 1401)
- 1402: Thomas Sprygy
- 1403-04: Thomas Overton (MP for Northampton, 1397)
- 1404-05: John Sywell (MP for Northampton, 1390)
- 1405: John Shrovesbury
- 1406: William Wale
- 1407: Simon Spycer
- 1408: William Shefford
- 1409: Henry Cayso
- 1410-11: John Spring (MP for Northampton, 1399)
- 1411: John Weller
- 1412: Thomas Wedon
- 1413: John Gregory
- 1414-15: John Spring
- 1416-17: John Loudham (MP 1399)
- 1417: Thomas Warwyk
- 1418–19: Thomas Sale
- 1420: John Sprygy
- 1421: Richard Wemys
- 1422–23: Thomas Sale
- 1424: Henry Cayso
- 1425–26: John Sprygy
- 1427: Richard May
- 1428: John Sprygy
- 1429: John Loutheham (MP 1399)
- 1430-31: William Rushden (MP for Northampton, 1411)
- 1431: John Barnett
- 1432–33: Thomas Sale
- 1434–35: Henry Stone
- 1436: John Sprygy
- 1437: John Perry
- 1438: John Hancock
- 1439: William Rushden, jr
- 1440: Richard Welnys
- 1441: John Balderswell
- 1442: Thomas Bottesham
- 1443: William Peryn
- 1444: Thomas Deraunt
- 1445: Thomas Saxby
- 1446: John Asheborne
- 1447: William Rushden, jr
- 1448: Gilbert Lyster
- 1449: Thomas Knightley
- 1450: William Coke
- 1451: William May
- 1452: Thomas Brayfield
- 1453: William Perrin
- 1454: John Asheborne
- 1455: William Rushden, jr
- 1456: Thomas Hunt
- 1457: Gilbert Lyster
- 1458: Thomas Saxby
- 1459: William Austen
- 1460: William Maye
- 1461: William Scamfeld
- 1462: William Herd
- 1463: William Perrin
- 1464: Thomas Hunt
- 1465: John Butler
- 1466: John Hancock
- 1467: William Austin
- 1468: William Maye
- 1469: John Clarke
- 1470: William Heron
- 1471: Thomas Saxilby
- 1472: Thomas Hunt
- 1473: John Wilcocks
- 1474: Simon Kilsby
- 1475: William Austin
- 1476: Henry Coleman
- 1477: Simon Bradfield
- 1478: William Harrow
- 1479: William Mills
- 1480: Thomas Hunt
- 1481: Thomas Poope
- 1482: John Clarke
- 1483: William Lynde
- 1484: William Wiseman
- 1485: Simon Bradfield
- 1486: Henry Humphrey
- 1487: John Astley
- 1488: Thomas Derby
- 1489: William Flower
- 1490: John Watts
- 1491: Henry Humphrey
- 1492: John Smith
- 1493: John Bell
- 1494: Roger Butler
- 1495: John Disney and John Goldwyer
- 1496: Matthew Sweyne
- 1497: Thomas Watts
- 1498: Henry Humphry
- 1499: Thomas Newman
- 1500: John Smith
- 1501: Richard Crispe
- 1502: Richard Green
- 1503: Thomas Parks
- 1504: John Sakes
- 1505: Robert Shefford
- 1506: William Buckby
- 1507: Henry Humphrey
- 1508: John Saxby
- 1509: John Perven
- 1510: Richard Crispe and John Watts
- 1511: John Smith and John Hilton
- 1512: Roger Gold
- 1513: Thomas Penny
- 1514: Thomas Chipsey (founder of Northampton Grammar School)
- 1515: John Walker
- 1516: William Band
- 1517: Richard Dickson
- 1518: Richard Wheeler
- 1519: John Saxby
- 1520: Richard Bowers
- 1521: John Buckby
- 1522: Richard Howard
- 1523: Thomas Addington
- 1524: John Perven
- 1525: Lawrence Manley (MP for Northampton, 1529: and 1553)
- 1526: John Motte
- 1527: Thomas Chipsey
- 1528: William Band
- 1529: Richard A’Bowers
- 1530: Richard Dickson and John Saxby
- 1531: John Saxby
- 1532: Lawrence Washington (ancestor of George Washington)
- 1533: Richard Wilkinson
- 1534: Nicholas Rands
- 1535: Lawrence Manley
- 1536: William Wager
- 1537: John Motte
- 1538: Thomas Chipsey
- 1539: Henry Neal
- 1540: Richard A' Bowers
- 1541: John Brightwell
- 1542: Anthony Bryan
- 1543: Christopher Bernard
- 1544: Richard Johnson
- 1545: Lawrence Washington
- 1546: Richard Wilkinson
- 1547: Lawrence Manley
- 1548: Henry Clarke
- 1549: John Browne
- 1550: Ralph Freeman (MP for Northampton, 1554)
- 1551: Nicholas Rands
- 1552: Henry Neal
- 1553: George Coldwell
- 1554: William Taylor and William Petnall
- 1555: Anthony Bryan
- 1556: John Balguy
- 1557: Lawrence Manley and John Browne (following death of the former)
- 1558: John Long
- 1559: Edward Manley (MP for Northampton, 1558)
- 1560: Thomas Hopkins
- 1561: Thomas Collis
- 1562: Ralph Maynard
- 1563: Richard Wharloe
- 1564: Thomas Pemerton
- 1565: John Balguy
- 1566: Edward Manley
- 1567: John Bryan
- 1568: Henry Wandley
- 1569: Thomas Hopkins
- 1570: Ralph Maynard
- 1571: Richard Wharloe
- 1572: John Hensman
- 1573: Henry Clarke
- 1574: Edward Manley
- 1575: Edward Stretley
- 1576: Henry Wandley
- 1577: William Raynsforde
- 1578: John Bryan
- 1579: Thomas Crosswell
- 1580: John Hopkins
- 1581: John Kyrtlande
- 1582: Lawrence Manley, jr
- 1583: John Mercer
- 1584: John Hensman
- 1585: William Rainsford
- 1586: John Bicheno
- 1587: Thomas Humphrey
- 1588: Thomas Crosswell
- 1589: John Holland
- 1590: Thomas Fryer
- 1591: John Cooper
- 1592: Lawrence Ball
- 1593: John Bryan
- 1594: Edward Mercer
- 1595: George Rainsford
- 1596: Thomas Crosswell
- 1597: John Mercer
- 1598: Thomas Humphrey
- 1599: Edward Hensman
- 1600: Thomas Atkins
- 1601: Thomas Judkins
- 1602: Edward Mercer
- 1603: George Rainsford
- 1604: Thomas Crosswell
- 1605: George Coldwell
- 1606: Roger Higham
- 1607: Edward Hensma
- 1608: Francis Fisher
- 1609: Abraham Ventris
- 1610: Thomas Bradford
- 1611: Raphael Humphrey
- 1612: Edward Mercer
- 1613: Robert Roson
- 1614: Lawrence Rainsford
- 1615: James Mercer
- 1616: Thomas Martin
- 1617: George Rainsford
- 1618: Edward Collis
- 1619: Raphael Humphrey
- 1620: Henry Chadwick
- 1621: Thomas Cooper
- 1622: Richard Woollaston
- 1623: Thomas Gutteridge
- 1624: Thomas Martin
- 1625: Roger Sargent
- 1626: William Knight
- 1627: John Danbie
- 1628: John Gifford
- 1629: John Harbert
- 1630: John Bott
- 1631: Matthew Sillesbie
- 1632: John Twigden
- 1633: Thomas Cowper
- 1634: Thomas Gutteridge
- and Thomas Martin
- 1635: William Knight
- 1636: John Gifford
- 1637: William Collis
- 1638: Richard Fowler
- 1639: John Danby
- 1640: John Fisher
- 1641: Lawrence Ball
- 1642: John Gifford (NB Reference to "Mayor Fisher" in letter to Parliament may indicate some local issue)
- 1643: Francis Rushworth
- 1644: Joseph Sergeant
- 1645: Samuel Martin
- 1646: Peter Whalley (MP for Northampton, 1654)
- 1647: John Spicer
- 1648: Thomas Pindleton
- 1649: Matthew Silsbie
- 1650: Benoni Coldwell
- 1651: Thomas Maynard
- 1652: Lawrence Woolaston
- 1653: Henry Sprigg
- 1654: Edward Collis
- 1655: Peter Whalley / John Spicer
- 1656: Joseph Sergeant
- 1657: Jonathan Whiston
- 1658: William Selby
- 1659: Thomas Collins
- 1660: John Twigden
- 1661: Thomas Thornton
- 1662: William Spencer (deposed by K. Charles)
- 1662: John Brayfield
- 1663: William Vaughan
- 1664: Francis Pickmer
- 1665: John Friend (Frend or Freind)
- 1666: Richard Rands
- 1667: Richard Massingberd
- 1668: John Stevens and John Friend
- 1669: William Spencer
- 1670: Edward Collis
- 1671: Joseph Sergeant
- 1672: John Willoughby
- 1673: John Howes
- 1674: Jonathan Whiston
- 1675: Edward Knighton
- 1676–77: John Friend
- 1678: Richard White
- 1679: Richard White
- 1680: Bartholomew Manning
- 1681: William Else
- 1682: Thomas Atterbury
- 1683: Thomas Sergeant
- 1684: Robert Styles
- 1685: Robert Ives, jr
- 1686: Theophilus Whiston
- 1687: William Wallis (deposed by K. James)
- 1688: Henry Flexney (deposed by K. James)
- 1688: John Selby
- 1689: James Green
- 1690: Thomas Chadwick. (or possibly Chaddock or Haddock)
- 1691: John Clark
- 1692: William Agutter
- 1693: Samuel Clifford
- 1694: John Collis
- 1695: Jonathan Warner
- 1696: Robert Ives, jr
- 1697: John Clarke
- 1698: John Hoare and John Clarke
- 1699: Thomas Brafield
- 1700: Edward Ivory
- 1701: William Pettitt
- 1702: Benjamin Bullivant
- 1703: Samuel Clifford
- 1704: John Whithorne
- 1705: John Clarke
- 1706: Richard Sanders, sr
- 1707: Henry Jeffcutt.
- 1708–09: Samuel Lyon
- 1710: Joseph Woolston
- 1711: John Agutter
- 1712: John Clarke
- 1713: Thomas Carr
- 1714: Thomas Peach, sr
- 1715: John Loasbey
- 1716: John Wallis
- 1717: John Wallis
- 1718: Richard Jeffcott
- 1719: Thomas Ives
- 1720: Richard Sanders
- 1721: Paul Agutter
- 1722: William Burt
- 1723: Thomas Hayes
- 1724: Nicholas Jeffcutt
- 1725: Nicholas Battin
- 1726: George Thompson
- 1727: Samuel Williamson
- 1728: Samuel Plackett
- 1729: John Pratt
- 1730: Nathaniel Easton
- 1731: Thomas Peach, jr
- 1732: Edward Bayly
- 1733: John Woolston
- 1734: John Battin
- 1735: John Fawsitt (Spelling unclear – Fawcett, Fawcitt or Fossett)
- 1736: Thomas King
- 1737: Benjamin Chapman
- 1738: Samuel Marriott
- 1739: Stanford Farrin
- 1740: Joseph Woolston, jr
- 1741: George Hayes
- 1742: John Newcome
- 1743: Charles Lyon
- 1744: William Williamson
- 1745: John Gibson
- 1746: John Smith
- 1747: William Fabian
- 1748: Charles Stratford
- 1749: Henry Locock
- 1750: Sloswick Carr and Joseph Woolston
- 1751: Richard Moore
- 1752: John Plackett
- 1753: George Thompson
- 1754: Henry Jeffcutt
- 1755: William Jackson
- 1756: Stamford Farrin
- 1757: Robert Lucas
- 1758: Lucas Ward
- 1759: John Fox
- 1760: Robert Tyers
- 1761: Robert Morris
- 1762: William Giles
- 1763: Joseph Elston
- 1764: William Davis
- 1765: Robert Balaam
- 1766: John Davies
- 1767: Thomas Breton (Spelling unclear – Britten, Bretton or Britton)
- 1768: John Edwards
- 1769: Henry Woolley
- 1770: Samuel Sturgess
- 1771: William Gibson
- 1772: William King
- 1773: Henry Thompson
- 1774: Edward Kerby
- 1775: John Newcome
- 1776: William Chamberlain
- 1777: Robert Trasler
- 1778: Edward Cole
- 1779: James Clarke
- 1780: William Thompson
- 1781: Clarke Hillyard
- 1782: William Marshall
- 1783: James Sutton
- 1784: Richard Mills
- 1785: William Gibson
- 1786: Samuel Treslove
- 1787: Hill Gudgeon
- 1788: Richard Meacock
- 1789: Thomas Hall
- 1790: John Lucy
- 1791: James Miller
- 1792: William Francis
- 1793: Jeremiah Briggs
- 1794: Thomas Hall
- 1795: Thomas Hall
- 1796: Charles Smith
- 1797: John Matthew Hopkins
- 1798: Francis Osborn
- 1799: George Osborn
- 1800: Thomas Johnson
- 1801: Samuel Holt
- 1802: Charles Freeman
- 1803: William Birdsall
- 1804: William Gibson and Francis Hayes
- 1805: Thomas Armfield
- 1806: Joshua Cooch
- 1807: Luke Kirshaw
- 1808: Thomas Hall
- 1809: Nathaniel Jones
- 1810: Philip Constable
- 1811: John Chambers
- 1812: Marmaduke Newby
- 1813–15: William Brown
- 1816: Francis Mulliner
- 1817: John Barrett
- 1818: William Birdsall
- 1819: Robert Smithson
- 1820: William Henfrey
- 1821: Pickering Phipps I
- 1822: George Osborn, Jun
- 1823: James Birdsall
- 1824: James Castell
- 1825: Edward Gates
- 1826: Daniel Hewlett
- 1827: Francis Mulliner
- 1828-29: John Marshall
- 1830: Henry Lenton Stockburn
- 1831: John Phipps
- 1832: John Freeman
- 1833: William Fisher Morgan
- 1834: William Gates
- 1835: Charles Freeman
- 1836-37: George Peach
- 1838: Thomas Hagger
- 1839: Thomas Sharp
- 1840: William Williams
- 1841: William Turner
- 1842-44: Edward Harrison Barwell
- 1845: John Groom
- 1846: Thomas Sharp
- 1847-48: Joseph Wykes
- 1849-50: Francis Parker
- 1851: Thomas Hagger
- 1852: Philadelphus Jeyes
- 1853: William Williams
- 1854: William Dennis
- 1855: Christopher Markham
- 1856: William Thomas Higgins
- 1857: William Hensman
- 1858: William Roberts
- 1859: Edmund Francis Law
- 1860: Pickering Phipps II, (MP for Northampton, 1860–1866)
- 1861: Henry Philip Markham
- 1862: John Phipps
- 1863: Mark Dorman
- 1864: Thomas Osborne
- 1865: James Barry
- 1866: Pickering Phipps II
- 1867: J. Berridge Norman
- 1868: J. Middleton Vernon
- 1869: William Adkins
- 1870: Pickering P. Perry
- 1871: Henry Marshall
- 1872: William Jones
- 1873: Richard Turner
- 1874: William Adkins
- 1875: Joseph Gurney
- 1876: George Turner
- 1877: Thomas Tebbutt
- 1878: William Dennis
- 1879: Joseph Gurney
- 1880: Robert Derby
- 1881: William John Peirce
- 1882: William Coulson
- 1883: Sir Philip Manfield (MP for Northampton, 1891)
- 1884–85: Thomas Adams
- 1886: Richard Cleaver
- 1887: Frederick Covington
- 1888: James Barry
- 1889: William Mills
- 1890: George Norman
- 1891: Edwin Bridgewater
- 1892: Henry Martin
- 1893: Henry Edward Randall
- 1894: William Tomes
- 1895: Frederick Ellen
- 1896: Henry Edward Randall
- 1897: Wm. P. Hannen
- 1898: Francis Tonsley
- 1899: Joseph Jeffery
- 1900–01: Frederick. Geo. Adnitt
- 1902: Thomas Purser
- 1903: Edward Lewis
- 1904: Albert Ernest Marlow
- 1905: James Manfield
- 1906: Edward L. Poulton
- 1907: Thos. Lansberry Wright
- 1908: John Brown
- 1909: Henry Butterfield
- 1910: Samuel Yarde
- 1911: Lee Fyson Cogan
- 1912: Harvey Reeves
- 1913: George Wilson Beattie
- 1914: Frederick Charles Parker
- 1915: Joseph Elias Pearse
- 1916: John Woods
- 1917: Abraham John Chown
- 1918: John James Martin
- 1919: Fred Kilby
- 1920: Wm. Harvey Reeves
- 1921: George Smith Whiting
- 1922: Charles Earl
- 1923: Thomas Davies Lewis
- 1924: Horace Walter Dover
- 1925: John George Cowling
- 1926: James Peach
- 1927: Joseph Rogers
- 1928: Arthur-E. Ray
- 1929: Ralph Austin Smith
- 1930: Ernest Ingman
- 1931: Charles John Scott
- 1932: Percy F. Hanafy (Nov–Jan 33)
- 1933: Helen E. Hanafy (Jan–Nov)
- 1933: Edward Allitt
- 1934: Albert Burrows
- 1935: Sidney Perkins
- 1936: Geo. W. Beattie
- 1937: John Veasey Collier
- 1938 (W.): Howes Percival
- 1938 (A.): WO. Lyne.
- 1939: Herbert A. Glenn
- 1940: Arthur L. Chown
- 1941: James E. Bugby
- 1942: William Lees
- 1943: Alfred Weston
- 1944: Sydney Strickland
- 1945: Fred A. Watts
- 1946: Percival C. Williams
- 1947: Sydney Strickland (Sept/Nov)
- 1947/48: Harriett M. Nicholls
- 1949/50: Leonard Smith
- 1950/51: Cyril Abraham Chown
- 1951/52: Frank Lee
- 1952/53: Percy W. Adams
- 1953/54: Wm. A. Pickering
- 1954/55 (J.): V. Collier
- 1955/56: Walter Lewis
- 1956/57: Thos. H. Cockerill
- 1957/58: Frederick. P. Saunders
- 1958/59 (V.): J. H. Harris
- 1959/60: George Nutt
- 1960: C.M.Newton (May–Nov)
- 1960/61: Elsie E. Wilkinson (Dec–May)
- 1961/62: Kathleen M. Gibbs
- 1962/63: E. F. Tompkins
- 1963/64: G. J. Hackett
- 1964/65: J. B. Corrin
- 1965/66: D. Wilson
- 1966/67: Grace Brown
- 1967/68: T. H. Dockrell
- 1968/69: Ruth G. Perkins
- 1969/70: John Poole
- 1970/71: Philip Gibson
- 1971/72: C. E. Stopford
- 1972/73: Ken. R Pearson
- 1974: Evelyn E. Fitzhugh (April–May)
- 1974/75: John L. Rawlings
- 1975/76: John L. Gardner
- 1976/77: John Taleen Barnes
- 1977/78: Mark Oliver Aldridge
- 1978/79: David. Arthur Walmsley
- 1979/80: Frederick Desborough
- 1980/81: Mary Finch
- 1981/82: Alexander Herbert William Prouse
- 1982/83: Reginald William Harris
- 1983/84: Roger Maxwell Winter
- 1984/85: Stanley Thomas James
- 1985/86: Ronald Ernest Linsdell
- 1986/87: Cyril Reginald Benton
- 1987/88: Trevor Richard Bailey
- 1988/89: Ronald George Liddington
- 1989/90: Malcolm Frederick Lloyd
- 1990/91: Geoffrey Peter Howes
- 1991/92: Donald Edwards
- 1992/93: Frank Tero
- 1993/94: Anthea Elizabeth Howes
- 1994/95: Alwyn Jesse Hargrave
- 1995: Leslie Thomas Patterson (Jan–May)
- 1995/96: Leslie ThomasPatterson
- 1996/97: Jaswant Singh Bains
- 1997/98: Richard Wilfrid Church
- 1998/99: Ulric Egerton Gravesande
- 1999/2000: Arthur McCutcheon
- 2000/01: Vivienne Patricia Dams
- 2001/02: Timothy John Hadland
- 2002/03: Michael Geoffrey Boss
- 2003/04: Terence George Wire
- 2004/05: Barry William Massey
- 2005/06: Sally Beardsworth
- 2006/07: Colin Lill
- 2007/08: Lee Mason
- 2008/09: Brian Markham
- 2009/10: Michael Hill
- 2010–11: Marianne Taylor
- 2011/12: Jamie Lane
- 2012/13: Roger Conroy
- 2013/14: Les Marriott
- 2014/15: John Caswell
- 2015/16: Penelope Flavell
- 2016/17: Christopher Malpas
- 2017/18: Gareth Eales
- 2018/19: Tony Ansell
- 2019/20: Nazim Choudary
- 2020/21: Brian Sargeant
- 2021/22: Rufia Ashraf
- 2022/23: Dennis Meredith
- 2023/24: Stephen Hibbert
- 2024/25: Paul Joyce
- 2025/26: Jane Birch
- 2026/27 Mike Hallam
