= Kingston upon Hull North West =

Parliamentary constituency in the United Kingdom, 1918–1950

- Former borough constituency for the House of Commons

1918–1950
- Seats: one
- Created from: Hull West
- Replaced by: Hull Central and Hull North

Kingston upon Hull North West was a borough constituency in the city of Kingston upon Hull in East Yorkshire. It returned one Member of Parliament (MP) to the House of Commons of the Parliament of the United Kingdom.

The constituency was created for the 1918 general election, and abolished for the 1950 general election.

== Boundaries ==
The County Borough of Kingston-upon-Hull wards of Albert, Botanic, Newland, and Park.

== Members of Parliament ==
Election	Member	Party
1918	Lambert Ward	Conservative
1945	Kim Mackay	Labour
1950	constituency abolished	

== Elections ==
=== Elections in the 1910s ===
General election 1918: Hull North West
Party	Candidate	Votes	%	±%
Unionist	Lambert Ward	10,898	59.7	
Liberal	Guy Wilson*	3,827	21.0	
Labour	Alf Gould	3,528	19.3	
Majority		7,071	38.7	
Turnout		18,253	58.1	
Registered electors		31,417		
Unionist win (new seat)				

* Wilson was issued with the Coalition Coupon but repudiated it.

=== Elections in the 1920s ===
General election 1922: Hull North West
Party	Candidate	Votes	%	±%
Unionist	Lambert Ward	14,904	57.1	−2.6
Liberal	John Barran	11,204	42.9	+21.9
Majority		3,700	14.2	−24.5
Turnout		26,108	77.0	+18.9
Registered electors		33,885		
Unionist hold		Swing	−12.3	

General election 1923: Hull North West
Party	Candidate	Votes	%	±%
Unionist	Lambert Ward	12,674	50.2	−6.9
Liberal	John Barran	12,559	49.8	+6.9
Majority		115	0.4	−13.8
Turnout		25,233	73.7	−3.3
Registered electors		34,251		
Unionist hold		Swing	−6.9	

General election 1924: Hull North West
Party	Candidate	Votes	%	±%
Unionist	Lambert Ward	15,072	53.3	+3.1
Liberal	John Barran	8,080	28.5	−21.3
Labour	F. L. Kerran	5,151	18.2	New
Majority		6,992	24.8	+24.4
Turnout		28,303	81.2	+7.5
Registered electors		34,835		
Unionist hold		Swing	+12.2	

Alderton

General election 1929: Hull North West
Party	Candidate	Votes	%	±%
Unionist	Lambert Ward	14,764	41.6	−11.7
Labour	William Pickles	10,700	30.1	+11.9
Liberal	Catherine Alderton	10,059	28.3	−0.2
Majority		4,064	11.5	−13.3
Turnout		35,523	79.1	−2.1
Registered electors		44,913		
Unionist hold		Swing	−11.8	

=== Elections in the 1930s ===
General election 1931: Hull North West
Party	Candidate	Votes	%	±%
Conservative	Lambert Ward	26,549	72.7	+31.1
Labour	James Baum	9,946	27.3	−2.8
Majority		16,603	45.4	+33.9
Turnout		36,495	79.8	+0.7
Conservative hold		Swing	+16.8	

General election 1935: Hull North West
Party	Candidate	Votes	%	±%
Conservative	Lambert Ward	19,278	57.9	−14.8
Labour	Edgar P Young	14,044	42.1	+14.8
Majority		5,234	15.8	−29.6
Turnout		33,322	72.0	−7.8
Conservative hold		Swing	-14.8	

=== Elections in the 1940s ===
General election 1945: Hull North West
Party	Candidate	Votes	%	±%
Labour	Kim Mackay	13,944	48.7	+6.6
Conservative	Lambert Ward	10,450	36.5	−21.4
Liberal	Harold Stewart Freemantle	4,235	14.8	New
Majority		3,494	12.2	N/A
Turnout		28,629	76.9	+4.9
Labour gain from Conservative		Swing	+14.0	
