= Thomas Smith (trade unionist) =

British trade union leader and politician

Thomas Smith (1847 – December 1919) was a British trade union leader and politician.

Born in Stone, Staffordshire, Smith was taught bootmaking by his father, and the two moved first to Worcester, then to Stafford, to find work. In Stafford, Smith became involved with the trade union movement, and in time became leader of the Staffordshire Riveters.

In 1873, Smith organised a conference which successfully persuaded various local bootmakers' unions to merge. They formed the National Union of Boot and Shoe Rivetters and Finishers, and Smith easily elected as its first general secretary. He moved to Leicester to set up headquarters there, and became active in the local Liberal Party. Running the union proved difficult, with opposition from some employers, various factions vying for influence, and finances precarious, but it survived. In 1877, when the Trades Union Congress was held in Leicester, Smith was elected to its Parliamentary Committee.

Smith was elected to Leicester School Board in 1877, and the year after, resigned as secretary of the union to become the full-time secretary of the Leicester Liberal Association, although he retained his union membership. He remained secretary of the Liberals until 1892, by which time he had also been elected to Leicester Town Council. He then took employment with the Board of Trade as an official arbitrator in trade disputes. Remaining on the council, he served as Mayor of Leicester in 1907/08.

Smith died in 1919, while serving as an alderman on the council. His obituary in The Observer noted that he was a friend of Henry Broadhurst.

Trade union offices
Preceded by New position	General Secretary of the National Union of Boot and Shoe Rivetters and Finishers; 1874–1878	Succeeded by George Sedgwick
