= Irish Shoe and Leather Workers' Union =

The Irish Shoe and Leather Workers' Union (ISLWU) was a trade union representing workers involved in shoemaking in Ireland.

The union was founded on 1 January 1953, as a split from the National Union of Boot and Shoe Operatives (NUBSO), which was based in Britain. It initially consisted of the whole 5,000 members in the Republic of Ireland. NUBSO members in Northern Ireland did not split, but NUBSO arranged for them to be represented by ISLWU officers in the short-term; it later set up an office in Banbridge and broke the link.

In 1977, the ISLWU merged into the Irish Transport and General Workers' Union.
