= George Sedgwick =

British trade union leader

George Sedgwick (28 October 1846 – 24 March 1934) was a British trade union leader.

Born in Ironbridge in Shropshire, Sedgwick was educated in Birmingham before becoming a boot closer. He joined the Birmingham Rivetters' And Finishers' Society and served firstly as its president, then as its secretary. He left the trade to join the British Army, serving the Worcester Rifle Corps, but soon returned to bootmaking, settling in Stafford.

In Stafford, Sedgwick joined the Amalgamated Society of Cordwainers, but he felt that a new national union was needed, so he worked with Thomas Smith to found the National Union of Boot and Shoe Rivetters and Finishers. When it was established, in 1874, he became its full-time agent and, when Smith stepped down as general secretary in 1878, he took over the post.

As leader of the union, Sedgwick focused on its role in arbitration, describing its purpose as being a "mediator between employers and workmen in trade disputes". He also served on the Parliamentary Committee of the Trades Union Congress in 1884 and 1885.

Sedgwick was elected to Leicester School Board in 1879, and also became the first chair of the Leicester Working Men's Club. He stood down from his posts in 1886 to become a factory inspector, one of the first workers to hold the post, and was also appointed as a magistrate. He retired from paid work in 1896, but chaired munitions tribunals during World War I and continued as a magistrate until his death in 1934 aged 87.

Trade union offices
Preceded by Thomas Smith	General Secretary of the National Union of Boot and Shoe Rivetters and Finishers; 1878–1886	Succeeded by William Inskip
Preceded by Neil McLean and John Smyth	Auditor of the Trades Union Congress; 1881–1882; With: W. A. Coote (1881); Peter Shorrocks (1882)	Succeeded by James Millar Jack and Thomas Sharples
