= Joseph Finn =

Front page of Finns pamphlet criticising immigration controls from an internationalist perspective

Joseph Finn (1865–1945) was a trade unionist and journalist in Britain.

Born to a Jewish family in Eastern Europe, Finn became a tailors' machiner in Leeds, in England. He was fluent in both English and Yiddish, and became the Leeds correspondent of the radical Der Poylisher Yidl. Founded by Morris Winchevsky, it was the first London-based socialist paper in Yiddish, first published in 1884 in Spitalfields, the centre of the tailoring and clothing trades. Finn joined the Social Democratic Federation (SDF), and tried to promote solidarity between Jewish workers and socialists in the city. He remained with the SDF until 1885, when he was part of the breakaway which formed the Socialist League.

In 1884, Finn worked with James Sweeney of the Jewish Tailors' Society to lead a strike. This was unsuccessful, as the union had no funds and so could not provide strike pay. The following year, Finn led a further strike, calling for a reduction in the length of the working day. This was better planned, and strikebreakers imported from London were given pre-paid return train tickets to encourage them to leave. This was successful, but Finn faced victimisation by employers and struggled to find work, instead relocating to Boston, Massachusetts.

In America, Finn continued working in tailoring, and was also active in the local socialist group. In 1893, he returned to England, this time settling in the East End of London, and in 1895 he was elected as secretary of the London United Ladies' Tailors' Trade Union. He also wrote a pamphlet, Voice of the Alien, arguing that Eastern European workers were not taking the jobs of English people, but were instead contributing to the economy.

During the 1910s, Finn was a frequent contributor to The New Age, writing in opposition to antisemitism, and in support of an economic federation of European nations.
