= Lewis Lyons =

- Born: 1862; Whitechapel, London
- Died: 7 July 1918 (aged 55–56); Tooting, Surrey, London
- Occupations: trade unionist, tailor, agitator
- Known for: Founder of trade unions

Lewis Lyons (20 November 1862 – 7 July 1918) was a British trade unionist who led numerous tailors' unions in the United Kingdom.

== Early life ==
Lyons was born in Whitechapel, London, to German Jewish parents Moses Lyons, a journeyman tailor, and his wife, Hannah Goldsmith.

== Career ==
He became a tailors' machiner, joining the Amalgamated Society of Tailors, and in time became the secretary of its Jewish branch. In 1885, he joined the Social Democratic Federation, and while attending one of its meetings he was arrested for obstructing the police. Because he was Jewish, he was given a harsh sentence of two months' imprisonment with hard labour, and a fine of 40 shillings. William Morris attended the court hearing, and was successful in getting the sentence overturned.

The late 1880s saw much unemployment, and Lyons worked with Philip Krantz to organise the Jewish Unemployed Committee. He lobbied Hermann Adler, Chief Rabbi, to support unemployed Jewish workers, but Adler was entirely unsympathetic.

In 1888, the East End Jewish Master Tailors' Association rejected a list of demands for better working conditions, submitted by Jewish tailors. A House of Lords Committee on the subject of sweatshop labour in tailoring also failed to make any recommendations. As a result, Lewis organised a strike, in conjunction with two small unions representing machiners and pressers. The strike gained support, and three weeks later, 6,000 tailors had stopped work, and John Burns, Tom Mann and Ben Tillett addressed meetings.

At the start of the Bryant and May Match girls' strike of July 1888, Lyons addressed a group of striking girls and women outside the Bryant and May factory and was taken into custody by police and then bailed.

On 12 September, the Jewish Master Tailors' Association proposed concessions, including a maximum twelve-hour working day, but withdrew them at the last moment, instead falsely claiming that agreement had been reached and the strike was over. This tactic was unsuccessful, and eventually on 3 October an agreement was reached, conceding all the union's demands, and also banning piece work.

Following the strike, the smaller unions merged to form the International Tailors', Machiners' and Pressers' Trade Union, and Lyons agreed to become its full-time president. He campaigned for the removal of middlemen, and for wholesalers which manufactured goods to do so in their own workshops. This was opposed by the employers, and Lyons led a further strike, but the union's members were not fully in support, and at the end of 1891, it split. The part led by Lewis renamed itself as the International Journeyman Tailors', Machiners' and Pressers' Trade Union, and focused on enabling Jewish tailors to refuse to work on the Sabbath.

In 1892, Lyons returned to campaigning on behalf of unemployed Jewish workers. On this occasion, he persuaded Adler to meet with him, but Adler made clear that he believed Lyons was overestimating the problem. Lyons continued this campaign for a few years, but as the union's membership fell, he decided to move to Bristol and open a cigar shop.

Lyons returned to London in about 1900, where he repeatedly took on the leadership of small unions of Jewish tailors, but then resign or be dismissed on the grounds of his poor financial management and advocacy of a joint organisation of workers and small masters. In 1909, he established the London Tailors' Council, and was its first chair, but he began suffering from poor health and had to resign the post shortly afterwards.
