= Thomas Frederick Richards =

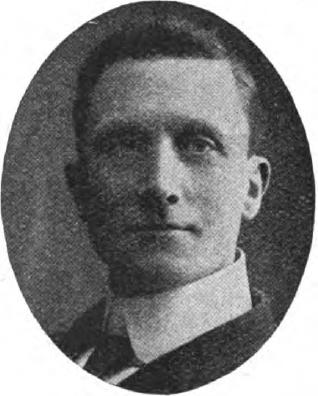
Richards in the mid 1900s

Thomas Frederick Richards (25 March 1863 – 4 October 1942) was a British trade unionist and Labour Party politician.

Born in Wednesbury, Staffordshire, in the English Black Country, he was the son of a commercial traveller. Following an elementary education, he started work at the age of eleven. He moved to Leicester, a centre for the manufacture of footwear. In 1893 he began his career as a full-time union official, taking up a post with the Leicester Branch of the Boot and Shoe Operatives. From 1894–1903 he was a member of Leicester Borough Council.

Richards was chosen by the Labour Representation Committee to contest the Wolverhampton West constituency at the 1906 general election. Against expectations he defeated the sitting Conservative Member of Parliament, Sir Alfred Hickman. The Conservatives put their defeat down to apathy by their supporters, and when the next general election was held in January 1910 made a determined effort to regain the seat. Their candidate, Alfred Bird, was able to unseat Richards. Richards attempted to return to the Commons in December 1910 when he unsuccessfully contested East Northamptonshire.

Richards returned to trade union work and local politics. He was general president of the National Union of Boot and Shoe Operatives from 1910–1929 and a member of the Management Committee of the General Federation of Trades Unions from 1905–1924. He was a member of Leicester City Council 1929–1939.

He died at his home at Birstall, Leicester, aged 79 in October 1942.

Parliament of the United Kingdom
Preceded by Sir Alfred Hickman	Member of Parliament for Wolverhampton West; 1906–1910	Succeeded by Alfred Bird
Trade union offices
Preceded by Charles Freak	General President of the National Union of Boot and Shoe Operatives; 1910–1929	Succeeded by William R. Townley
