= Leather Union =

The Leather Union (German: Gewerkschaft Leder, GL) was a West German trade union representing workers in shoemaking, tanning, saddlery, and other work related to leather.

The union was founded in 1949 and affiliated to the German Trade Union Confederation. The union was strongest in the cities of Kornwestheim, Erlangen, and Offenbach, where the leather industry was centred, and the local offices in these cities were important in the structure of the union. From the late 1950s, each workplace elected a union representative. This enabled the union to run with a relatively low number of full-time staff.

Membership of the union peaked in 1953, and then steadily declined, halving to 52,719 by 1982. Although, following the reunification of Germany, leather workers in the former East German Textile, Clothing and Leather Union transferred to the Leather Union, this did not stall the decline, although the membership density in the industry remained stable.

By 1996, the union had only 21,929 members. It considered a merger with the Textile and Clothing Union, but as that was also in decline, it rejected the idea. The following year, it merged with the Union of Mining and Energy and the Chemical, Paper and Ceramic Union, to form IG Bergbau, Chemie, Energie.

== Presidents ==
1949: Philipp Mittwich
1959: Adolf Mirkes
1976: Gerhard Wilhelm van Haaren
1980: Helmut Teitzel
1983: Wilhelm Kappelmann
1985: Werner Dick
