= Parliamentary Committee of the Trades Union Congress =

The Parliamentary Committee of the Trades Union Congress was the leading body of the British trade union movement from 1871 until 1921.

== History ==
The Trades Union Congress (TUC) was established in 1868 and formed a committee to act on its decisions and direct activities between conferences. Initially, this was an informal body, and the leading role in the movement was taken by the unelected "Junta", with limited backing from their Conference of Amalgamated Trades. In 1871, they decided to dissolve their organisation and throw their support behind the TUC.

Now occupying the leading position in the British trade union movement, the TUC decided to formalise its activities. Its committee was re-established as the "Parliamentary Committee", indicating that, at that time, the TUC was focused on lobbying the Parliament of the United Kingdom to enact new legislation favourable to workers, and to ensure that current legislation was enforced.

Trade union membership grew rapidly during the life of the committee, and it was enlarged on several occasions, settling for a time at 12 members, then reaching a maximum of 16. After a rail strike in 1919 was resolved by mediation, Ernest Bevin proposed that the TUC should take on a mediation role throughout the movement. A committee investigated the proposal, and concurred, but argued that the Parliamentary Committee could not take on the work, as it was under-resourced and insufficiently representative. In 1921, it was replaced by the General Council of the TUC, an enlarged body which employed full-time members of staff.

== Members ==
A full list of members is available in the Trades Union Congress's Report of the 1921 Annual Trades Union Congress. Additional details are from W. J. Davis, History of the British Trades Union Congress.

=== 1868 to 1871 ===
There were six members of the informal committee which existed until 1871:

Year	Secretary/ Chairman	Member	Member	Member	Member	Member
1868	W. H. Wood; Manchester TC	C. D. Dewhurst; Bradford TC	William Dronfield; Sheffield TC	George Potter; London TC	Peter Shorrocks; Manchester TC	Thomas J. Wilkinson; Birmingham TC
1869	George Potter; London TC	Alfred Bailey; Tailors	William Dronfield; Sheffield TC	Edwin Coulson; Bricklayers	George Howell; Bricklayers	John Kane; Ironworkers
1870	George Potter; London TC	Alfred Bailey; Tailors	William Dronfield; Sheffield TC	Edwin Coulson; Bricklayers	George Howell; Bricklayers	John Kane; Ironworkers

In 1871, an exploratory Parliamentary Committee was created with five members.

Year	Secretary	Chairman	Member	Member	Member
1871	George Howell; Bricklayers	George Potter; London TC	Lloyd Jones; Manchester Fustian	Joseph Leicester; Flint Glass Makers	Alexander Macdonald; Miners

=== 1872 to 1906 ===
The Parliamentary Committee was firmly established at the 1872 Congress, with nine members, although William Allan was given an additional place for the first year.

Year	Secretary	Chairman	Treasurer	Year	Member	Member	Member	Member	Member	Member	Member	Member	Member	Member
1872	George Howell; Bricklayers	Alexander Macdonald; Miners	William Allan; Engineers	1872	Thomas Halliday; Amalg. Miners	William Hicking; Nottingham TC	David Higham; Typographical	John Kane; Ironworkers	William Leigh; Spinners	William H. Leatherland; Nottingham TC	George Thomas; London Shoemakers	10 members in 1872/3		
1873	George Howell; Bricklayers	Alexander Macdonald; Miners	William Allan; Engineers	1873	Daniel Guile; Iron Founders	William Owen; Turners	George Odger; London TC	John Kane; Ironworkers	Thomas Plackett; Leeds TC	Peter Shorrocks; Tailors	9 members in 1873/4			
1874	George Howell; Bricklayers	Alfred Bailey; Tailors	Daniel Guile; Iron Founders	1874	William Allan; Engineers	Joseph Arch; Agricultural	George Odger; London TC	Andrew Boa; Glasgow TC	Henry Broadhurst; Stonemasons	Alexander Macdonald; Miners	Thomas Mottershead; Preston TC	William Rolley; Sheffield TC	11 members 1874 – 1894	
1875	George Howell; Bricklayers	Robert Knight; Boilermakers	Daniel Guile; Iron Founders	1875	Thomas Birtwistle; NE Lancs Weavers	Thomas Halliday; Miners	George Odger; London TC	John Kane; Ironworkers	Henry Broadhurst; Stonemasons	John D. Prior; Amalg. Carpenters	George Shipton; London Painters	William Rolley; Sheffield TC	11 members 1874 – 1894	
1875	Henry Broadhurst; Stonemasons	John Kane; Ironworkers	George Shipton; London Painters	1875	Alfred Bailey; Tailors	Thomas Halliday; Miners	George Odger; London TC	John Battersby; Scottish Typographical	Robert Knight; Boilermakers	John D. Prior; Amalg. Carpenters	Henry Taylor; Agricultural	William Rolley; Sheffield TC	11 members 1874 – 1894	
1876	Henry Broadhurst; Stonemasons	John D. Prior; Amalg. Carpenters	George Shipton; London Painters	1876	Alfred Bailey; Tailors	Thomas Halliday; Miners	George Odger; London TC	John Battersby; Scottish Typographical	Robert Knight; Boilermakers	Joseph Arch; Agricultural	John Burnett; Engineers	William Rolley; Sheffield TC	11 members 1874 – 1894	
1877	Henry Broadhurst; Stonemasons	John D. Prior; Amalg. Carpenters	George Shipton; London Painters	1877	Alfred Bailey; Tailors	George M. Ball; Agricultural	Thomas Birtwistle; NE Lancs Weavers	John Inglis; Blacksmiths	Robert Knight; Boilermakers	Henry Slatter; Typographical	John Burnett; Engineers	Thomas Smith; Boot & Shoe	11 members 1874 – 1894	
1878	Henry Broadhurst; Stonemasons	John D. Prior; Amalg. Carpenters	George Shipton; London Painters	1878	William Crawford; Durham Miners	George M. Ball; Agricultural	Thomas Birtwistle; NE Lancs Weavers	John Inglis; Blacksmiths	Robert Knight; Boilermakers	Henry Slatter; Typographical	John Burnett; Engineers	James Fitzpatrick; Liverpool TC	11 members 1874 – 1894	
1879	Henry Broadhurst; Stonemasons	Henry Slatter; Typographical	John Burnett; Engineers	1879	William Crawford; Durham Miners	George M. Ball; Agricultural	Thomas Birtwistle; NE Lancs Weavers	John Inglis; Blacksmiths	Robert Knight; Boilermakers	Alfred Bailey; Tailors	John D. Prior; Amalg. Carpenters	George Shipton; London Painters	11 members 1874 – 1894	
1880	Henry Broadhurst; Stonemasons	William Crawford; Durham Miners	John Burnett; Engineers	1880	Henry Slatter; Typographical	George M. Ball; Agricultural	Thomas Birtwistle; NE Lancs Weavers	John Inglis; Blacksmiths	Robert Knight; Boilermakers	Alfred Bailey; Tailors	John D. Prior; Amalg. Carpenters	George Shipton; London Painters	11 members 1874 – 1894	
1881	Henry Broadhurst; Stonemasons	Thomas Birtwistle; NE Lancs Weavers	John Burnett; Engineers	1881	William Crawford; Durham Miners	W. J. Davis; Brassworkers	William Paterson; Scottish Carpenters	John Inglis; Blacksmiths	Robert Knight; Boilermakers	Alfred Bailey; Tailors	Henry Slatter; Typographical	George Shipton; London Painters	11 members 1874 – 1894	
1882	Henry Broadhurst; Stonemasons	John Inglis; Blacksmiths	John Burnett; Engineers	1882	William Crawford; Durham Miners	W. J. Davis; Brassworkers	William Paterson; Scottish Carpenters	Thomas Birtwistle; NE Lancs Weavers	Robert Knight; Boilermakers	Alfred Bailey; Tailors	Henry Slatter; Typographical	James Mawdsley; Spinners	11 members 1874 – 1894	
1883	Henry Broadhurst; Stonemasons	Alfred Bailey; Tailors	John Burnett; Engineers	1883	William Crawford; Durham Miners	John Inglis; Blacksmiths	G. D. Kelley; Printers	Thomas Birtwistle; NE Lancs Weavers	W. H. Leatherland; Nottingham TC	James S. Murchie; Amalg. Carpenters	Henry Slatter; Typographical	George Shipton; London Painters	11 members 1874 – 1894	
1884	Henry Broadhurst; Stonemasons	James S. Murchie; Amalg. Carpenters	John Burnett; Engineers	1884	William Crawford; Durham Miners	John Inglis; Blacksmiths	Alfred Bailey; Tailors	Thomas Birtwistle; NE Lancs Weavers	J. M. Jack; Iron Moulders	James Mawdsley; Spinners	Henry Slatter; Typographical	George Sedgwick; Boot & Shoe	11 members 1874 – 1894	
1885	George Shipton; London Painters	James Mawdsley; Spinners	John Burnett; Engineers	1885	William Crawford; Durham Miners	John Inglis; Blacksmiths	Alfred Bailey; Tailors	Thomas Birtwistle; NE Lancs Weavers	J. M. Jack; Iron Moulders	James S. Murchie; Amalg. Carpenters	Henry Slatter; Typographical	George Sedgwick; Boot & Shoe	11 members 1874 – 1894	
1886	Henry Broadhurst; Stonemasons	J. M. Jack; Iron Moulders	Henry Slatter; Typographical	1886	William Crawford; Durham Miners	James Mawdsley; Spinners	Alfred Bailey; Tailors	Thomas Birtwistle; NE Lancs Weavers	George Shipton; London Painters	James S. Murchie; Amalg. Carpenters	James Swift; Steam Engine Makers	Stuart Uttley; Sheffield TC	11 members 1874 – 1894	
1887	Henry Broadhurst; Stonemasons	William Crawford; Durham Miners	Henry Slatter; Typographical	1887	Edward Harford; Railway Servants	James Mawdsley; Spinners	John Inglis; Blacksmiths	Thomas Birtwistle; NE Lancs Weavers	George Shipton; London Painters	William Inskip; Boot & Shoe	J. M. Jack; Iron Moulders	G. D. Kelley; Printers	11 members 1874 – 1894	
1888	Henry Broadhurst; Stonemasons	George Shipton; London Painters	Henry Slatter; Typographical	1888	Edward Harford; Railway Servants	James Mawdsley; Spinners	John Inglis; Blacksmiths	Thomas Birtwistle; NE Lancs Weavers	William Crawford; Durham Miners	William Inskip; Boot & Shoe	J. M. Jack; Iron Moulders	James S. Murchie; Amalg. Carpenters	11 members 1874 – 1894	
1889	Henry Broadhurst; Stonemasons	James Swift; Steam Engine Makers	Henry Slatter; Typographical	1889	Edward Harford; Railway Servants	James Mawdsley; Spinners	John Inglis; Blacksmiths	Thomas Birtwistle; NE Lancs Weavers	William Crawford; Durham Miners	William Inskip; Boot & Shoe	George Shipton; London Painters	Havelock Wilson; Sailors	11 members 1874 – 1894	
1890	Charles Fenwick; Northumberland Miners	Edward Harford; Railway Servants	William Inskip; Boot & Shoe	1890	John Burns; Engineers	James Mawdsley; Spinners	J. M. Jack; Iron Moulders	G. D. Kelley; Printers	William Matkin; General Carpenters	Benjamin Pickard; Miners	Stuart Uttley; Sheffield TC	Havelock Wilson; Sailors	11 members 1874 – 1894	
1891	Charles Fenwick; Northumberland Miners	John Wilson; Durham Miners	William Inskip; Boot & Shoe	1891	Thomas Birtwistle; Weavers	Edward Harford; Railway Servants	John Inglis; Blacksmiths	G. D. Kelley; Printers	William Matkin; General Carpenters	James Mawdsley; Spinners	T. R. Threlfall; Typographical	Havelock Wilson; Sailors	11 members 1874 – 1894	
1892	Charles Fenwick; Northumberland Miners	Havelock Wilson; Sailors	William Inskip; Boot & Shoe	1892	John Anderson; Engineers	Edward Harford; Railway Servants	John Hodge; Steel Smelters	David Holmes; Weavers	J. M. Jack; Iron Moulders	James Mawdsley; Spinners	Ben Tillett; General Labourers	John Wilson; Durham Miners	11 members 1874 – 1894	
1893	Charles Fenwick; Northumberland Miners	John Burns; Engineers	William Inskip; Boot & Shoe	1893	Henry Broadhurst; Stonemasons	Edward Cowey; Miners	John Hodge; Steel Smelters	David Holmes; Weavers	J. M. Jack; Iron Moulders	James Mawdsley; Spinners	Ben Tillett; General Labourers	Havelock Wilson; Sailors	11 members 1874 – 1894	
1894	Sam Woods; Miners	David Holmes; Weavers	William Inskip; Boot & Shoe	1894	Henry Broadhurst; Stonemasons	Edward Cowey; Miners	John Burns; Engineers	Edward Harford; Railway Servants	J. M. Jack; Iron Moulders	James Mawdsley; Spinners	Ben Tillett; General Labourers	Havelock Wilson; Sailors	Richard Sheldon; Belfast TC	Will Thorne; Gasworkers
1895	Sam Woods; Miners	Edward Cowey; Miners	William Inskip; Boot & Shoe	1895	Francis Chandler; Amalg. Carpenters	George Ferguson; Engineers	John Hodge; Steel Smelters	Edward Harford; Railway Servants	J. M. Jack; Iron Moulders	James Mawdsley; Spinners	David Holmes; Weavers	Havelock Wilson; Sailors	Alexander Wilkie; Shipwrights	Will Thorne; Gasworkers
1896	Sam Woods; Miners	Will Thorne; Gasworkers	William Inskip; Boot & Shoe	1896	Francis Chandler; Amalg. Carpenters	Edward Cowey; Miners	W. J. Davis; Brassworkers	Edward Harford; Railway Servants	J. M. Jack; Iron Moulders	James Mawdsley; Spinners	David Holmes; Weavers	Havelock Wilson; Sailors	Alexander Wilkie; Shipwrights	Robert Knight; Boilermakers
1897	Sam Woods; Miners	Alexander Wilkie; Shipwrights	William Inskip; Boot & Shoe	1897	Francis Chandler; Amalg. Carpenters	Edward Cowey; Miners	W. J. Davis; Brassworkers	Edward Harford; Railway Servants	C. W. Bowerman; London Compositors	William Mullin; Cardroom	David Holmes; Weavers	Havelock Wilson; Sailors	Will Thorne; Gasworkers	Robert Knight; Boilermakers
1898	Sam Woods; Miners	W. J. Davis; Brassworkers	William Inskip; Boot & Shoe	1898	Francis Chandler; Amalg. Carpenters	Edward Cowey; Miners	Walter Hudson; Railway Servants	Alexander Wilkie; Shipwrights	C. W. Bowerman; London Compositors	William Mullin; Cardroom	David Holmes; Weavers		Will Thorne; Gasworkers	Robert Knight; Boilermakers
1899	Sam Woods; Miners	Francis Chandler; Amalg. Carpenters	C. W. Bowerman; London Compositors	1899	W. J. Davis; Brassworkers	Edward Cowey; Miners	W. Boyd Hornidge; Boot & Shoe	Alexander Wilkie; Shipwrights	W. C. Steadman; Thames Barge Builders	William Mullin; Cardroom	David Holmes; Weavers		Will Thorne; Gasworkers	Robert Knight; Boilermakers
1900	Sam Woods; Miners	C. W. Bowerman; London Compositors	W. J. Davis; Brassworkers	1900	Charles Hobson; Kindred Trades	Edward Cowey; Miners	W. Boyd Hornidge; Boot & Shoe	Alexander Wilkie; Shipwrights	W. C. Steadman; Thames Barge Builders	William Mullin; Cardroom	David Holmes; Weavers	James Sexton; Dock Labourers	Will Thorne; Gasworkers	Robert Knight; Boilermakers
1901	Sam Woods; Miners	W. C. Steadman; Thames Barge Builders	W. J. Davis; Brassworkers	1901	Charles Hobson; Kindred Trades	Edward Cowey; Miners	W. Boyd Hornidge; Boot & Shoe	Alexander Wilkie; Shipwrights	C. W. Bowerman; Compositors	William Mullin; Cardroom	Francis Chandler; Amalg. Carpenters	James Sexton; Dock Labourers	Will Thorne; Gasworkers	D. C. Cummings; Boilermakers
1902	Sam Woods; Miners	W. Boyd Hornidge; Boot & Shoe	W. C. Steadman; Thames Barge Builders	1902	Richard Bell; Railway Servants	Edward Cowey; Miners	David Holmes; Weavers	Alexander Wilkie; Shipwrights	C. W. Bowerman; Compositors	William Mullin; Cardroom	Francis Chandler; Amalg. Carpenters	James Sexton; Dock Labourers	Will Thorne; Gasworkers	D. C. Cummings; Boilermakers
1903	Sam Woods; Miners	Richard Bell; Railway Servants	W. C. Steadman; Thames Barge Builders	1903	W. J. Davis; Brassworkers	Edward Cowey; Miners	David Holmes; Weavers	A. H. Gill; Cotton Spinners	C. W. Bowerman; Compositors	W. Boyd Hornidge; Boot & Shoe	Francis Chandler; Amalg. Carpenters	James Sexton; Dock Labourers	Will Thorne; Gasworkers	D. C. Cummings; Boilermakers
1904	Sam Woods; Miners	James Sexton; Dock Labourers	W. J. Davis; Brassworkers	1904	Richard Bell; Railway Servants	James Haslam; Miners	David Shackleton; Weavers	A. H. Gill; Cotton Spinners	C. W. Bowerman; Compositors	W. Boyd Hornidge; Boot & Shoe	W. C. Steadman; Thames Barge Builders	Alexander Wilkie; Shipwrights	Will Thorne; Gasworkers	D. C. Cummings; Boilermakers
1905	W. C. Steadman; Thames Barge Builders	D. C. Cummings; Boilermakers	W. J. Davis; Brassworkers	1905	Richard Bell; Railway Servants	James Haslam; Miners	David Shackleton; Weavers	A. H. Gill; Cotton Spinners	C. W. Bowerman; Compositors	W. Boyd Hornidge; Boot & Shoe	Francis Chandler; Amalg. Carpenters	Alexander Wilkie; Shipwrights	Will Thorne; Gasworkers	James Sexton; Dock Labourers
1906	W. C. Steadman; Thames Barge Builders	A. H. Gill; Cotton Spinners	W. J. Davis; Brassworkers	1906	Richard Bell; Railway Servants	James Haslam; Miners	David Shackleton; Weavers	George Barnes; Engineers	C. W. Bowerman; Compositors	W. Boyd Hornidge; Boot & Shoe	Francis Chandler; Amalg. Carpenters	Alexander Wilkie; Shipwrights	Will Thorne; Gasworkers	D. C. Cummings; Boilermakers

=== 1907 to 1916 ===
The committee was restructured at the 1907 Congress, sixteen members being elected. Eleven were elected from trade groups, and five from a "miscellaneous trades" group. Additionally, the secretary was elected separately. Davis continued to serve as treasurer for three more years before the post was abolished. Since 1900, the chairman had gone on to become president at the annual congress, and this practice was continued.

After only one year, the Engineers group was abolished, its seat given to the Miscellaneous Trades group, and most of the other groups were renumbered.

The groups were as follows:

Group (1907)	Group (1908 – 1916)	Trades
1	1	Boilermakers and Iron and Steel Shipbuilders
2	2	Building Trades
3	3	Cotton Operatives
4	4	Dock Labourers, Stevedores, Cranemen, Enginemen, etc.
5	Abolished	Engineers
6	5	Gasworkers and General Labourers
7	6	Metal Workers
8	7	Miners
9	8	Printing and Paper Trades
10	9	Railway Servants
11	10	Weavers
12	11	Miscellaneous Trades

The members in this period were:

Year	Secretary	Boilermakers	Building	Cotton	Dock	Engineers	Gasworkers	Metal	Miners	Printing	Railway	Weavers	Miscellaneous	Miscellaneous	Miscellaneous	Miscellaneous	Miscellaneous	Miscellaneous
1907	W. C. Steadman; Thames Barge Builders	D. C. Cummings; Boilermakers	Francis Chandler; Amalg. Carpenters	A. H. Gill; Spinners	James Sexton; Dock Labourers	George Barnes; Engineers	Will Thorne; Gasworkers	W. J. Davis; Brassworkers	James Haslam; Miners	C. W. Bowerman; Compositors	Richard Bell; Railway Servants	David Shackleton; Weavers	Ben Cooper; Cigar Makers	W. Boyd Hornidge; Boot & Shoe	William Mosses; Patternmakers	Joe Williams; Musicians	Alexander Wilkie; Shipwrights	Seat added 1908
1908	W. C. Steadman; Thames Barge Builders	D. C. Cummings; Boilermakers	Francis Chandler; Amalg. Carpenters	William Mullin; Cardroom	Thomas Watson; Enginemen	Group abolished	Will Thorne; Gasworkers	W. J. Davis; Brassworkers	James Haslam; Miners	C. W. Bowerman; Compositors	Richard Bell; Railway Servants	David Shackleton; Weavers	Matthew Arrandale; Machine Workers	Harry Gosling; Watermen	William Mosses; Patternmakers	Joe Williams; Musicians	Alexander Wilkie; Shipwrights	J. A. Seddon; Shop Assistants
1909	W. C. Steadman; Thames Barge Builders	John Hill; Boilermakers	Francis Chandler; Amalg. Carpenters	William Mullin; Cardroom	James Sexton; Dock Labourers	Group abolished	Will Thorne; Gasworkers	W. J. Davis; Brassworkers	James Haslam; Miners	C. W. Bowerman; Compositors	Richard Bell; Railway Servants	David Shackleton; Weavers	Matthew Arrandale; Machine Workers	Harry Gosling; Watermen	William Mosses; Patternmakers	Herbert Emery; Bakers	J. H. Jenkins; Shipwrights	J. A. Seddon; Shop Assistants
1910	W. C. Steadman; Thames Barge Builders	John Hill; Boilermakers	Francis Chandler; Amalg. Carpenters	William Mullin; Cardroom	James Sexton; Dock Labourers	Group abolished	Will Thorne; Gasworkers	W. J. Davis; Brassworkers	James Haslam; Miners	C. W. Bowerman; Compositors	J. E. Williams; Railwaymen	David Shackleton; Weavers	Matthew Arrandale; Machine Workers	Harry Gosling; Watermen	William Mosses; Patternmakers	Herbert Emery; Bakers	J. H. Jenkins; Shipwrights	J. A. Seddon; Shop Assistants
1911	C. W. Bowerman; London Compositors	John Hill; Boilermakers	William Matkin; General Carpenters	William Mullin; Cardroom	James Sexton; Dock Labourers	Group abolished	Will Thorne; Gasworkers	W. J. Davis; Brassworkers	James Haslam; Miners	Alfred Evans; Printers' Warehousemen	J. E. Williams; Railwaymen	J. W. Ogden; Weavers	Matthew Arrandale; Machine Workers	Harry Gosling; Watermen	William Mosses; Patternmakers	Herbert Emery; Bakers	J. H. Jenkins; Shipwrights	J. A. Seddon; Shop Assistants
1912	C. W. Bowerman; London Compositors	John Hill; Boilermakers	William Matkin; General Carpenters	William Mullin; Cardroom	James Sexton; Dock Labourers	Group abolished	Will Thorne; Gasworkers	W. J. Davis; Brassworkers	James Haslam; Miners	Alfred Evans; Printers' Warehousemen	J. E. Williams; Railwaymen	J. W. Ogden; Weavers	Matthew Arrandale; Machine Workers	Harry Gosling; Watermen	George Edwards; Agricultural	Joe Williams; Musicians	J. H. Jenkins; Shipwrights	J. A. Seddon; Shop Assistants
1913	C. W. Bowerman; London Compositors	John Hill; Boilermakers	William Matkin; General Carpenters	A. H. Gill; Spinners	James Sexton; Dock Labourers	Group abolished	Will Thorne; Gasworkers	W. J. Davis; Brassworkers	Herbert Smith; Miners	Alfred Evans; Printers' Warehousemen	J. E. Williams; Railwaymen	J. W. Ogden; Weavers	William Mosses; Patternmakers	Harry Gosling; Watermen	Alfred Smith; Vehicle Workers	Joe Williams; Musicians	J. H. Jenkins; Shipwrights	J. A. Seddon; Shop Assistants
1914	C. W. Bowerman; London Compositors	John Hill; Boilermakers	William Matkin; General Carpenters	A. H. Gill; Spinners	James Sexton; Dock Labourers	Group abolished	Will Thorne; Gasworkers	W. J. Davis; Brassworkers	Herbert Smith; Miners	Alfred Evans; Printers' Warehousemen	J. E. Williams; Railwaymen	J. W. Ogden; Weavers	William Mosses; Patternmakers	Harry Gosling; Watermen	Alfred Smith; Vehicle Workers	Joe Williams; Musicians	J. H. Jenkins; Shipwrights	J. A. Seddon; Shop Assistants
1915	C. W. Bowerman; London Compositors	John Hill; Boilermakers	Francis Chandler; Amalg. Carpenters	William Mullin; Cardroom	James Sexton; Dock Labourers	Group abolished	Will Thorne; Gasworkers	W. J. Davis; Brassworkers	Herbert Smith; Miners	Alfred Evans; Printers' Warehousemen	J. E. Williams; Railwaymen	J. W. Ogden; Weavers	Herbert Skinner; Typographical	Harry Gosling; Watermen	Alfred Smith; Vehicle Workers	Joe Williams; Musicians	J. H. Jenkins; Shipwrights	J. A. Seddon; Shop Assistants

=== 1916 to 1921 ===
From 1916, the trade groups were no longer used for elections. The council was enlarged to seventeen members plus the secretary. In 1919, it was cut back again to sixteen members.

Year	Secretary	Member	Member	Member	Member	Member	Member	Member	Member	Member	Member	Member	Member	Member	Member	Member	Member	Member
1916	C. W. Bowerman; London Compositors	Fred Bramley; Furnishing	W. J. Davis; Brassworkers	T. A. Flynn; Tailors	Harry Gosling; Watermen	John Hill; Boilermakers	J. H. Jenkins; Shipwrights	Edward Judson; Spinners	William Mosses; Patternmakers	J. W. Ogden; Weavers	Alfred Onions; Miners	Edward L. Poulton; Boot & Shoe	James Sexton; Dock Labourers	Robert Smillie; Miners	G. H. Stuart-Bunning; Postmen	J. H. Thomas; Railwaymen	Will Thorne; Gasworkers	R. B. Walker; Agricultural
1917	C. W. Bowerman; London Compositors	Fred Bramley; Furnishing	W. J. Davis; Brassworkers	Frederick Hall; Miners	Harry Gosling; Watermen	John Hill; Boilermakers	J. H. Jenkins; Shipwrights	Edward Judson; Spinners	Herbert Skinner; Typographical	J. W. Ogden; Weavers	Alfred Onions; Miners	Edward L. Poulton; Boot & Shoe	James Sexton; Dock Labourers	Joe Williams; Musicians	G. H. Stuart-Bunning; Postmen	J. H. Thomas; Railwaymen	Will Thorne; Gasworkers	R. B. Walker; Agricultural
1918	C. W. Bowerman; London Compositors	Margaret Bondfield; General Workers	W. J. Davis; Brassworkers	Thomas Greenall; Miners	Harry Gosling; Watermen	John Hill; Boilermakers	Robert Shirkie; Enginemen	Havelock Wilson; Sailors	Herbert Skinner; Typographical	J. W. Ogden; Weavers	Alfred Onions; Miners	Edward L. Poulton; Boot & Shoe	James Sexton; Dock Labourers	Joe Williams; Musicians	G. H. Stuart-Bunning; Postmen	J. H. Thomas; Railwaymen	Will Thorne; Gasworkers	R. B. Walker; Agricultural
1919	C. W. Bowerman; London Compositors	Margaret Bondfield; General Workers	W. J. Davis; Brassworkers	Henry Boothman; Spinners	Harry Gosling; Watermen	John Hill; Boilermakers	A. A. Purcell; Furnishing	Alonzo Swales; Engineers	Herbert Skinner; Typographical	J. W. Ogden; Weavers	Reduced to 16 members from 1919	Edward L. Poulton; Boot & Shoe	James Sexton; Dock Labourers	Joe Williams; Musicians	G. H. Stuart-Bunning; Postmen	J. H. Thomas; Railwaymen	Will Thorne; Gasworkers	R. B. Walker; Agricultural
1920	C. W. Bowerman; London Compositors	Margaret Bondfield; General Workers	John Beard; Workers Union	Henry Boothman; Spinners	Harry Gosling; Watermen	John Hill; Boilermakers	A. A. Purcell; Furnishing	Alonzo Swales; Engineers	Arthur Pugh; Iron & Steel	J. W. Ogden; Weavers	Reduced to 16 members from 1919	Edward L. Poulton; Boot & Shoe	James Sexton; Dock Labourers	Robert Smillie; Miners	Alfred Smith; Vehicle Workers	J. H. Thomas; Railwaymen	Will Thorne; Gasworkers	R. B. Walker; Agricultural
