= Thomas Mottershead (trade unionist) =

British unionist and activist

Thomas G. Mottershead (1826 – 5 December 1884) was a British trade unionist and socialist activist.

Born in Macclesfield, Mottershead became a weaver in the silk industry. He was a well-known Chartist, and during the 1850s was very interested in the proposals of William James Linton. By the 1860s, he was prominent in the Reform League, and alongside Randal Cremer and George Howell agreed to use the league to gather information for the Liberal Party. In 1869, he was a leading founder of the Labour Representation League, and later spent time as its secretary.

In 1869, Mottershead was elected to the General Council of the International Workingmen's Association, on which he was long known as an ally of Karl Marx, and acted as its corresponding secretary for Denmark. However, he fell out with Marx, in particular due to his refusal to consider Irish independence, and lost influence in the association after attending the 1872 Hague Congress while drunk.

Mottershead was also a prominent trade unionist, and served on the Parliamentary Committee of the Trades Union Congress in 1874/5, representing Preston Trades Council. He lost his seat the following year after coming behind Thomas Birtwistle in the voting.

At the 1874 UK general election, Mottershead stood as a Liberal-Labour candidate in Preston. A meeting of 5,000 workers at Preston Corn Exchange, chaired by Alfred Bailey, resolved to support his candidature. At that meeting, Mottershead stated that he was "determined to create a third party" representing labour. He ran against two Conservatives; they were both elected, taking 6,512 and 5,211 votes, while Mottershead came last with 3,756. When a by-election arose later in the year, Mottershead was again proposed as a candidate, although ultimately the election was unopposed.

In the late 1870s, Mottershead was a member of the executive of the Labour Representation League, using this position to campaign against war with Russia. He also sat on the executive of the London Trades Council. In 1883, he attended a conference in support of the Tichborne Claimant. He stated that, although he did not support the claimant's case, he felt that they had suffered enough.

Mottershead died in 1884, after suffering a fit while crossing Westminster Bridge. Although taken to hospital, he never regained consciousness.
