= John Mallinson (trade unionist) =

Scottish trade unionist and politician

John Mallinson (1860 – 12 January 1929) was a Scottish trade unionist and politician.

Mallinson worked as a cordwainer, and moved to Edinburgh in 1883. He took evening classes at Heriot-Watt College, and became active in the Edinburgh Cordwainers' Union. Although he held generally conservative views which were unpopular in the movement, his attention to detail and neutrality in chairing meetings were greatly valued, and he soon became a prominent figure.

By the 1890s, he was secretary of Edinburgh Trades Council. He was elected to Edinburgh City Council in 1893, only the second Liberal-Labour member of the council. When the Trades Union Congress (TUC) came to Edinburgh in 1896, he served as its President, and at the congress was also elected as its representative to the American Federation of Labour. He was surprised to be elected to the post, but it did not change his view that the TUC had done little for Scotland, and he worked with John Keir to establish the Scottish Trades Union Congress (STUC). However, when the STUC was actually established, he was unhappy with its structure, and unsuccessfully argued for a delay in creating it.

In 1908, Mallinson was appointed as Chief Attendance Officer to Edinburgh Council. He stood down from his trade union and political posts, but remained a magistrate. He died suddenly in 1929 while at work.

Trade union offices
Preceded by Edward Cowey and James Mawdsley	Trades Union Congress representative to the American Federation of Labour; 1896; With: Sam Woods	Succeeded by Edward Harford and Havelock Wilson
Preceded by John Hagan Jenkins	President of the Trades Union Congress; 1896	Succeeded by John Valentine Stevens
