= NSMM =

NSMM may stand for:

- National Science and Media Museum, museum in Bradford, England
- National Society of Metal Mechanics, former British trade union
