= William John Davis =

British trade unionist (1848–1934)

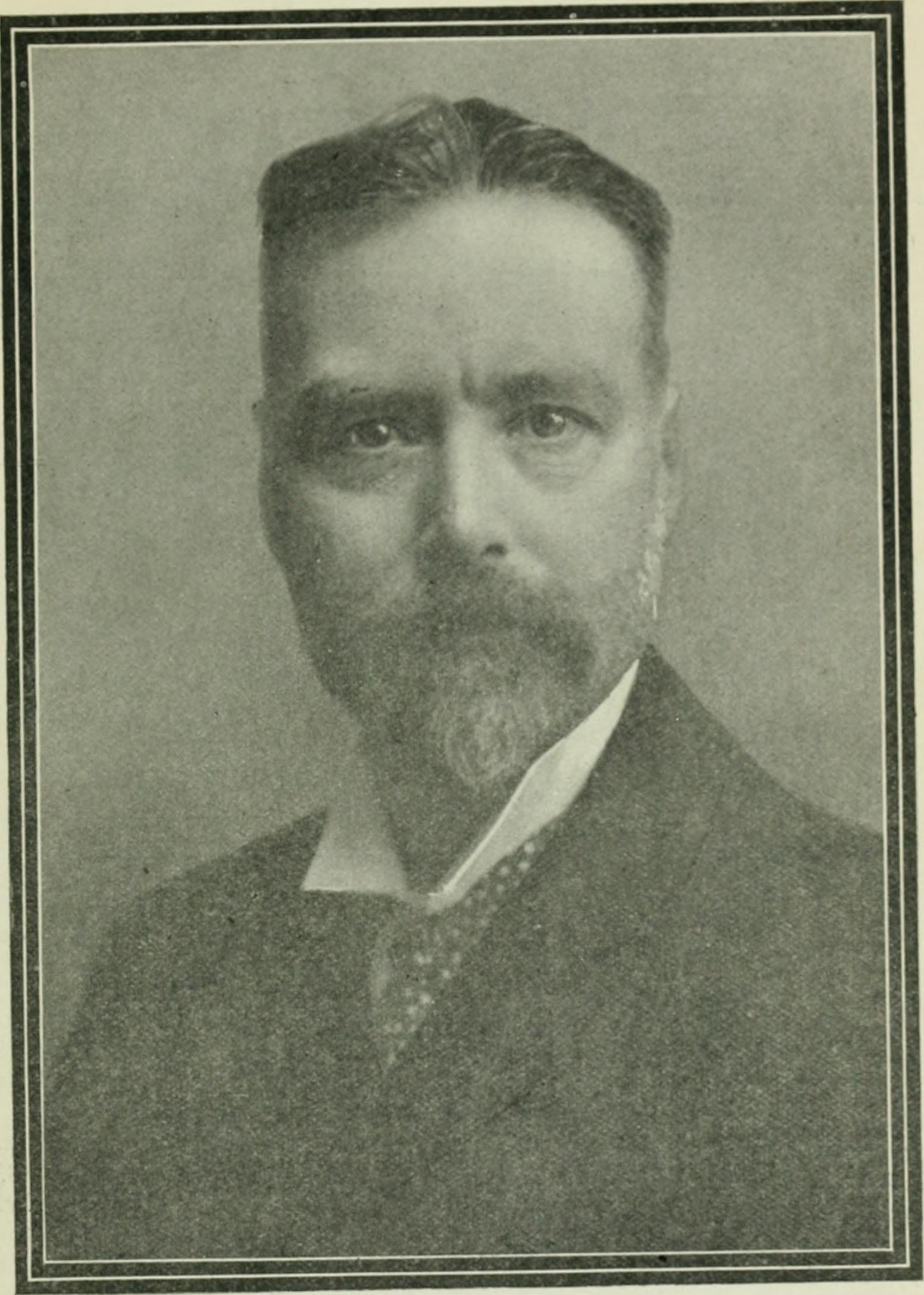
William John Davis

William John Davis CH (6 August 1848 – 20 October 1934) was a British trade unionist.

Born in Birmingham, Davis began working in a brass foundry. In 1869, he represented his local reform organisation at the Trades Union Congress. In 1871, he was a founder member of the Amalgamated Brassworkers Society, becoming its first general secretary.

Davis proved an effective secretary, increasing membership to 6,000 within a year. He was also active in the local Liberal Party, and in 1876 was elected to the school board, then in 1880, he became the first Liberal-Labour member of Birmingham City Council. In 1883, he stood down from the union to become a factory inspector. Under different leadership, membership of the union fell to only 2,000, and Davis agreed to return in 1889.

Davis worked with Alexander Wilkie and Robert Knight to found the General Federation of Trade Unions in 1899. From 1906 to 1910, he published The British Trades Union Congress: History and Recollections. In 1913, he served as President of the Trades Union Congress. He strongly supported the prosecution of both the Second Boer War and World War I, after which he led a short-lived movement for the Labour Party to focus solely on trade union issues.

Davis finally retired as general secretary of the Brassworkers in 1921, after which he retired to Paris.

Trade union offices
Preceded by New position	General Secretary of the Amalgamated Brassworkers Society; 1872–1883	Succeeded by ?
Preceded by John Inglis and H. R. King	Auditor of the Trades Union Congress; 1877; With: John P. Walker	Succeeded by William Count and James Fitzpatrick
Preceded by ?	General Secretary of the National Society of Amalgamated Brassworkers; 1888–1921	Succeeded by Arthur H. Gibbard
Preceded by Alexander Wilkie	Chairman of the Parliamentary Committee of the Trades Union Congress; 1898	Succeeded by Francis Chandler
Preceded by W. C. Steadman	Treasurer of the Trades Union Congress; 1902–1910	Succeeded by Position abolished
Preceded by Will Thorne	President of the Trades Union Congress; 1913	Succeeded by James Seddon
Party political offices
Preceded by John Hodge	Chairman of the Annual Conference of the Labour Representation Committee; 1902	Succeeded by Joseph Nicholas Bell
