= Edward Harford =

British trade unionist

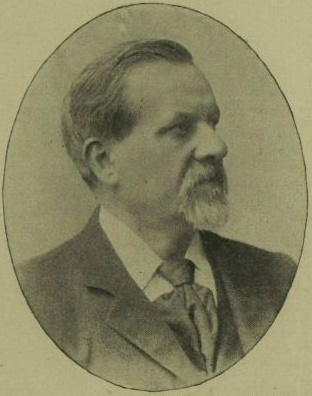
Harford, shortly before his death

Edward Harford (21 March 1838 – 11 January 1898) was a British trade unionist.

Born in Bristol, Harford grew up in Tiverton in Devon, where he completed five years of an apprenticeship in a confectionery factory. He moved to Hatherleigh to take a position in the Devon County Constabulary, where he married. He then became a porter with the Bristol and Exeter Railway.

This new career proved a success, and Harford found work at a higher grade with the Manchester, Sheffield and Lincolnshire Railway, based in Grimsby. He also joined the Amalgamated Society of Railway Servants (ASRS), which he represented at the 1871 Trades Union Congress (TUC), and in 1873 he became a full-time organiser for the union, based in Sheffield. However, the pay proved insufficient to support his family, now including five children, and he left to work in an iron foundry.

Harford remained supportive of the ASRS and, around 1880, found work for the union once more, now as joint secretary of its campaign for a nine-hour day. He became the union's national organiser in 1882, and when the union's general secretary was forced to retire due to poor mental health, he was the only candidate to take over.

As secretary, Harford pushed to increase membership, believing this would improve the union's bargaining position without the need for industrial action. Indeed, membership under his leadership increased from 8,000 to more than 50,000, and he completed a merger with the Scottish ASRS. He also continued to campaign for reduced working hours, and represented the union on the Parliamentary Committee of the TUC from 1887 until 1892 and 1894 to 1897.

Harford also took an interest in politics, and supported the election of working men to Parliament. He was the treasurer of the Labour Electoral Association, and stood unsuccessfully as a Liberal-Labour candidate for Northampton at the 1895 UK general election.

By 1897, Harford was facing growing opposition from within his union, with some members disliking his liberal politics and readiness to make concessions to employers. That year, Harford decided to settle two disputes despite the opposition of the ASRS executive, and after he appeared to be drunk at a concluding meeting, his opponents won a vote at the Annual General Meeting which led to him being dismissed, albeit with a pension. He spent the next few months as the TUC representative to the American Federation of Labour, but died on the return voyage, in January 1898, on board the SS Saint Paul.

Harford was buired in Abney Park Cemetery, Stoke Newington on 11 January 1898.

Trade union offices
Preceded by Fred W. Evans	General Secretary of the Amalgamated Society of Railway Servants; 1883–1897	Succeeded by Richard Bell
Preceded by James Swift	Chairman of the Parliamentary Committee of the Trades Union Congress; 1890	Succeeded by John Wilson
Preceded by John Mallinson and Sam Woods	Trades Union Congress representative to the American Federation of Labour; 1897; With: Havelock Wilson	Succeeded by William Inskip and Will Thorne
