= John Inglis (trade unionist) =

Scottish trade union leader

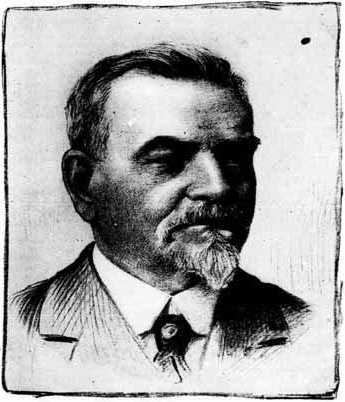
Contemporary sketch of Inglis

John Inglis (1833 or 1834 – 8 January 1911) was a Scottish trade union leader.

Born in Douglas, Lanarkshire, Inglis worked as a blacksmith at an ironworks in Glasgow. He came to prominence in 1857, as a founder of the Scottish United Operative Blacksmiths' Protection and Friendly Society. The following year, he was elected as the union's auditor, then in 1859 as its president, and in 1863 as its general secretary.

Inglis represented his union at the Trades Union Congress (TUC), serving on the Parliamentary Committee of the TUC for fifteen years, and as its chairman in 1882/3. While on the committee, he played a leading role in campaigning for the Trade Union Act 1871, which formally legalised trade unions in the UK, the Trade Union Act 1876, and the Fatal Accident Inquiry Act.

Inglis remained secretary of the union until his retirement in 1907. Although it remained small, under his leadership it began organising workers across the UK, and was renamed as the Associated Blacksmiths' Society.

Trade union offices
Preceded by David Stuart	General Secretary of the Associated Blacksmiths' Society; 1863 – 1907	Succeeded by John Thomson
Preceded by Edwin Coulson and James Fitzpatrick	Auditor of the Trades Union Congress; 1876; With: H. R. King	Succeeded by W. J. Davis and John P. Walker
Preceded by Thomas Birtwistle	Chairman of the Parliamentary Committee of the TUC; 1882 – 1883	Succeeded by Alfred Bailey
