= Havelock Wilson =

British trade union leader, Liberal politician and campaigner

Havelock Wilson c. 1922

Joseph Havelock Wilson CH CBE MP (16 August 1859 – 16 April 1929), commonly known as Havelock Wilson or J. Havelock Wilson, was a British trade union leader, Liberal Party politician, and campaigner for the rights of merchant seamen.

== Early life ==
He was born in Sunderland and went to sea as a boy, serving somewhere between 10 and 14 years at sea. In 1879 whilst still a seaman he married Jane Ann Watham at Sunderland. In 1882 he opened a "Temperance Hotel" in Sunderland settling down to life ashore at the age of 24.

== Political and trade union activities ==
He became involved in a local seamen's union established in Sunderland in 1879 and had become its president by 1885. Wilson pursued a policy of attempting to build branches in nearby ports, which met with some success but led to disagreements within the leadership. In 1887, Wilson broke with the Sunderland union to establish his own National Sailors' & Firemen's Union, which was committed to a policy of expansion. Wilson remained president of the union until his death.

Wilson rose to prominence in the late 1880s, on the back of the success of his union and his involvement in various strikes, including the London dock strike of 1889.

Wilson's first electoral contest was at a by-election in Bristol East in 1890, at which he did poorly. He won his second contest, at Middlesbrough in 1892, in which he stood as an independent labour candidate in opposition to a Gladstonian Liberal, and a Liberal Unionist.

Havelock Wilson c. 1895

Having secured election, however, like John Burns, Wilson moved quickly to cooperate with the Liberal Party. He also allied with existing Lib–Lab Members of Parliament (MPs) such as Thomas Burt and John Wilson. Wilson continued to align himself with the Liberal Party in politics despite the establishment and growth of the Independent Labour Party. Indeed, he was fiercely critical of the party and of key figures within it such as Keir Hardie and Ramsay MacDonald.

In 1893, Wilson brought an unsuccessful action for libel against The Evening News and Post, seeking thousands in damages. The newspaper was represented by the Irish Unionist Edward Carson. In late July 1893, a jury at Guildford found against Wilson, and the judge, Sir William Grantham, a former Conservative member of parliament, ordered him to pay the newspaper’s costs.

Wilson's union suffered in the early 1890s and almost collapsed in 1894.

Wilson retained his Middlesbrough seat in the 1895 general election but narrowly lost to Samuel Alexander Sadler, a Conservative, in the 1900 election – an election characterised by a considerable swing towards the Conservatives. He won Middlesbrough for a third and final time at the 1906 election.

General election 1906: Middlesbrough Electorate 20,322
| Party | Candidate | Votes | % | ±% |
|---|---|---|---|---|
| Liberal | Joseph Havelock Wilson | 9,271 | 52.6 | +2.8 |
| Conservative | Sir Samuel Alexander Sadler | 6,864 | 39.0 | −11.3 |
| Independent Labour | George Lansbury | 1,484 | 8.4 | n/a |
| Majority | | 2,407 | 13.6 | 14.0 |
| Turnout | | | 86.7 | |
| Liberal gain from Conservative | | Swing | +7.0 | |

He did not stand for Parliament in 1910.

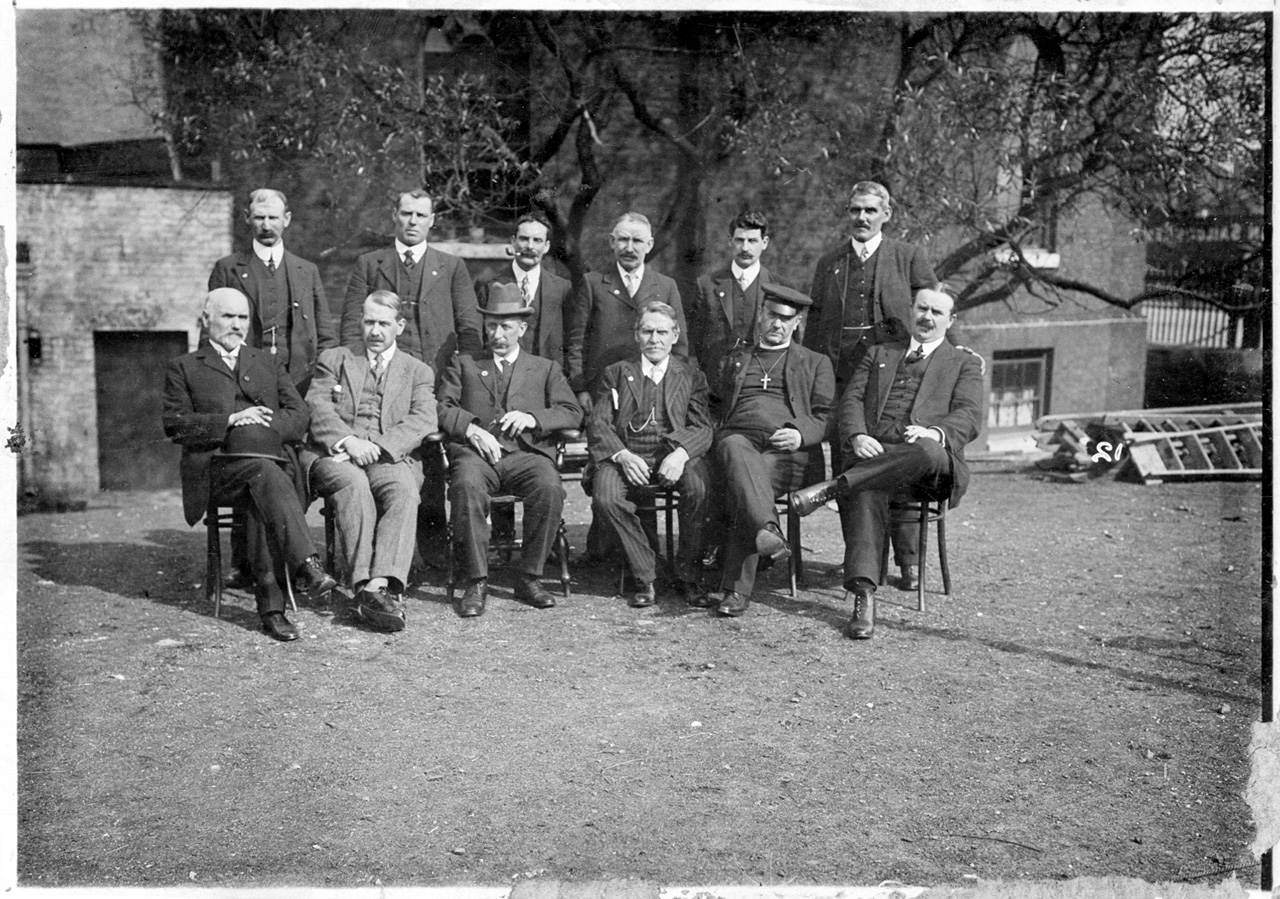
Wilson (seated third from left) with other trade unionists, 1911

Wilson's union revived in 1911, with the outbreak of a wave of seamen's and dockers' strikes in British ports. Despite his militant tactics, Wilson was a relative moderate whose goal was to establish friendly relations with shipowners and formal conciliation procedures in the shipping industry to enable disputes to be resolved without recourse to strikes or lockouts. This goal was steadily achieved after shipowners recognised the union in 1911 and began working closely with officials during the First World War. After 1917, wage rates and conditions were set by the National Maritime Board, which represented the Shipping Federation and Wilson's union.

Wilson and his union were noted as one of the most vociferous supporters of Britain's involvement in the First World War, because of the loss of merchant seamen to U-Boats. This was in contrast to the position of the miners, engineers and railwaymen, who became increasingly sceptical of Britain's war effort by the latter stages of the war.

He was a founder of the National Democratic Party but stood as a Liberal at the October 1918 by-election in South Shields, when he was elected unopposed. He held the seat as a Coalition Liberal at the 1918 general election. His last electoral contest came at the 1922 general election, when he stood as a National Liberal candidate, but lost his seat – coming third with only 20.5% of the vote.

In the 1920s, Wilson's reputation as a 'bosses' man' made him increasingly unpopular in the wider labour movement. His union was seen as having become little more than a “company union”.

Havelock Wilson was buried in Hendon Park Cemetery, with many dockers in attendance having walked to the graveside from Docklands.

Trade union offices
| Preceded by New position | General Secretary of the National Amalgamated Sailors' and Firemen's Union; 1887–1893 | Succeeded by Edmund Cathery |
| Preceded by John Wilson | Chairman of the Parliamentary Committee of the Trades Union Congress; 1892 | Succeeded by John Burns |
| Preceded by Samuel Plimsoll | President of the National Sailors' and Firemen's Union; 1894–1929 | Succeeded by Position abolished |
| Preceded by John Mallinson and Sam Woods | Trades Union Congress representative to the American Federation of Labor; 1897; With: Edward Harford | Succeeded by William Inskip and Will Thorne |
Parliament of the United Kingdom
| Preceded by Isaac Wilson | Member of Parliament for Middlesbrough; 1892–1900 | Succeeded by Sir Samuel Sadler |
| Preceded by Sir Samuel Sadler | Member of Parliament for Middlesbrough; 1906–1910 | Succeeded by Penry Williams |
| Preceded by Cecil Cochrane | Member of Parliament for South Shields; 1918–1922 | Succeeded by Edward Harney |
