= Francis Chandler =

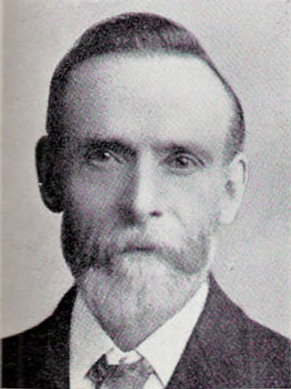
Chandler, while in office

Francis Chandler (1849 – 6 October 1937) was a British trade unionist.

Born in Harrow, Chandler became an apprentice joiner in Notting Hill at the age of fourteen. On completing the apprenticeship, he joined the Amalgamated Society of Carpenters and Joiners (ASC&J). Later in 1872, he became the secretary of the Amalgamated Society of Carpenters and Joiners in its Hammersmith branch.

In 1876, Chandler became secretary of the London United Trades Committee, a body bringing together various building trades unions in the city. The following year, there was a major strike among union members in Manchester, and Chandler co-ordinated fund-raising in London, sending £50 to £60 each week to the striking trade unionists. As a result of his efforts, his health suffered, and he stood down as secretary soon afterwards.

Chandler was also elected to the general council of the ASC&J in 1876, and when the union's general secretary, J. S. Murchie, died in 1888, he won the election for the post. While in office, Chandler served on the Royal Commission on the Poor Laws, signing the minority report. Chandler also represented the union at the Trades Union Congress (TUC), serving on the Parliamentary Committee of the Trades Union Congress on several occasions, and chairing the committee in 1899. He represented the TUC to the American Federation of Labour in 1901.

In his spare time, Chandler served on the Chorlton Board of Guardians, becoming its chairman in 1906.

Chandler retired in 1919, but maintained his connection with the union and its successor, the Amalgamated Society of Woodworkers, which marked his seventy-year-long membership shortly before his death in 1937.

Trade union offices
Preceded by Charles Matkin	Secretary of the London United Trades Committee; 1876 – 1878	Succeeded by ?
Preceded by J. S. Murchie	General Secretary of the Amalgamated Society of Carpenters and Joiners; 1888 – 1919	Succeeded by Alexander Gordon Cameron
Preceded by William John Davis	Chairman of the Parliamentary Committee of the Trades Union Congress; 1899	Succeeded by C. W. Bowerman
Preceded by Pete Curran and John Weir	Trades Union Congress representative to the American Federation of Labour; 1901; With: Ben Tillett	Succeeded by Matthew Arrandale and Enoch Edwards
