= Tom Jones (trade unionist) =

British trade unionist

Tom Jones (1 September 1822 – 1916) was a British trade unionist.

Born in Ledbury, Herefordshire, he worked in his father's tin plate business, before moving to London in 1839, where he joined the Operative Tin Plate Workers Society. In 1859, he acted in support of the London builders' strike, the movement which produced the London Trades Council, and Jones was elected as its first secretary, serving only one year. In the same year, he was elected as Secretary of the Tin Plate Workers, while, in 1861, he published the first national trade union directory, and helped launch the trade union journal, The Bee-Hive.

Jones was also known for his tall silk hats, always worn at an unusual angle. After standing down from his trade union posts in 1865, he became a foreman at R. W. Wilson, but he remained a union member and received a pension from them from 1892. He retired to Ledbury, where he lived to the age of ninety-four.

Trade union offices
Preceded by New position	Secretary of the London Trades Council; 1860–1861	Succeeded by George Howell
