= George Odger =

British trade unionist and radical politician (1813 – 1877)

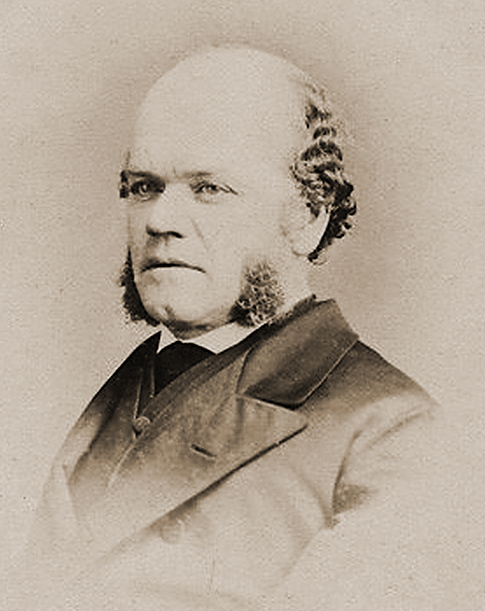
George Odger (1813–1877) pioneer British trade union leader and as a longtime member of the governing General Council of the International Workingmen's Association, also known as the First International.

George Odger (1813 – 4 March 1877) was a pioneer British trade unionist and radical Liberal politician, who also ran as a Lib-Lab by-election candidate.

He is best remembered as the head of the London Trades Council during the period of formation of the Trades Union Congress and as the first President of the First International.

== Biography ==
=== Early years ===
George Odger was born in 1813 in Roborough, Devon, England. Odger's father was a miner from Cornwall and the family was an impoverished one, forcing George to be apprenticed as a shoemaker at about 10 years of age. Odger's formal education was limited and primitive, but he was able to expand his intellectual horizons through self-education and reading.

Odger travelled the country in search of work as a shoemaker, eventually landing in London around the age of 20. There he became active in the nascent trade union movement, joining the Ladies Shoemakers' Society, which later became part of the Amalgamated Society of Cordwainers.

=== Trade union leader ===
Odger first came to public attention in 1859 when he served on a general committee to coordinate aid for striking workers in the London builders' strike of that year. This led to active participation in the London Trades Council when it was founded the following year, followed by election to the position of Secretary of that organisation in 1862.

Also in 1862, Odger became the Chairman of the Manhood Suffrage and Vote by Ballot Association. A vigorous supporter of the anti-slavery Republicans in the American Civil War, Odger is credited with helping shift the editorial line of the labour newspaper The Bee-Hive from supporting the Confederate States of America in the conflict.

Odger was associated with the Workman's Advocate, which became the press organ of the International and the Reform League, and from 1866 to 1867 he was editor of the renamed Commonwealth. Also in 1866, he represented the London Trades Council at the first conferences the United Kingdom Alliance of Organised Trades, while in 1867, he joined the Conference of Amalgamated Trades.

Shortly after the Reform League's Hyde Park demonstration in 1867, Odger attended a private meeting of a dozen senior members of the league in which the French revolutionary Gustave Paul Cluseret proposed they start a civil war in England. According to John Bedford Leno, George Odger spoke out in support of Cluseret's proposal but this was misreported in the next days issue of The Times. George Odger was in the minority of the league, which rejected the proposal overwhelmingly.

=== President of the First International ===
On 28 September 1864 a meeting was held at the St. Martin's Hotel in London to launch an international association bringing together trade union leaders from Great Britain and the European continent, with a view to forestall the ability of employers to use unwitting foreign workers as a means of enforcing lockouts or breaking strikes. As a leading member of the British trade union movement, George Odger not only attending this foundational gathering but was a prominent speaker at the event. The organisation resulting from the gathering would be known as the International Workingmen's Association, remembered today as the so-called First International. George Odger would be named to the governing General Council of this organisation, remaining in that position until his resignation in 1872.

During this interval Odger also remained active in the Trades Union Congress (TUC), he was the Secretary of its Parliamentary Committee, the post later to become the General Secretary, from 1872 to 1873.

=== Electoral politician ===
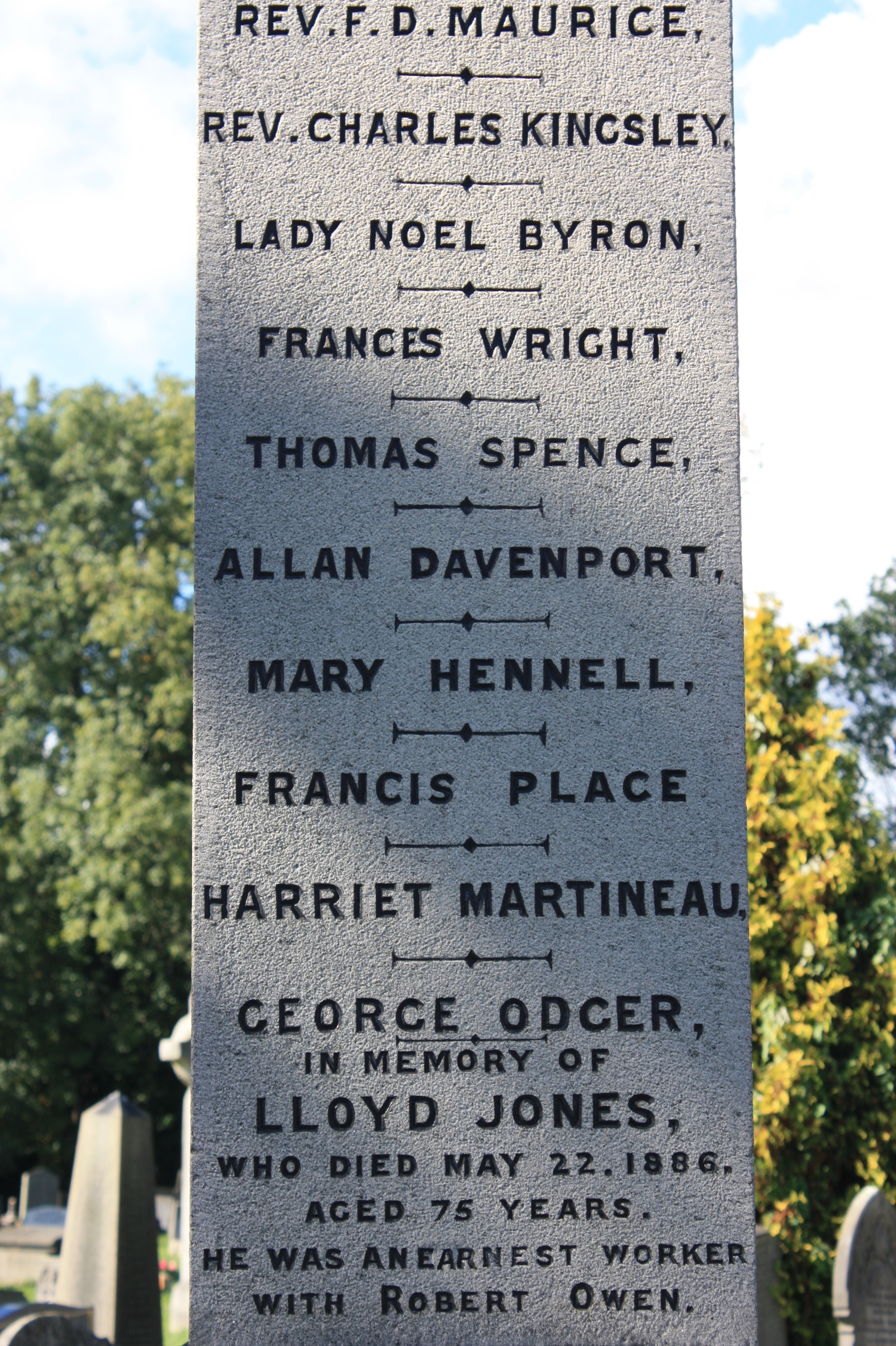
Base of the Reformers Memorial, Kensal Green Cemetery, showing George Odger's name.

Odger put himself forward electorally for the first time in the new constituency of Chelsea in the 1868 General election – the first held since passage of the Reform Act 1867 that granted the right to vote to part of the male urban working class for the first time. Although his participation had been sought by a great number of local voters, controversy erupted that Odger's participation would split the Liberal vote and he subsequently withdrew from the race.

In June 1869 Odger was one of four Liberal candidates to compete for two seats in the borough of Stafford. Odger would finish in third place in the primary election, with the two Liberal victors defeated in the general election by Thomas Salt and Reginald Arthur James Talbot.

Odger also stood as a Lib–Lab candidate in Southwark in the February 1870 by-election there, losing by about 300 votes out of more than 9,000 cast in a three-way race.

=== Death and legacy ===
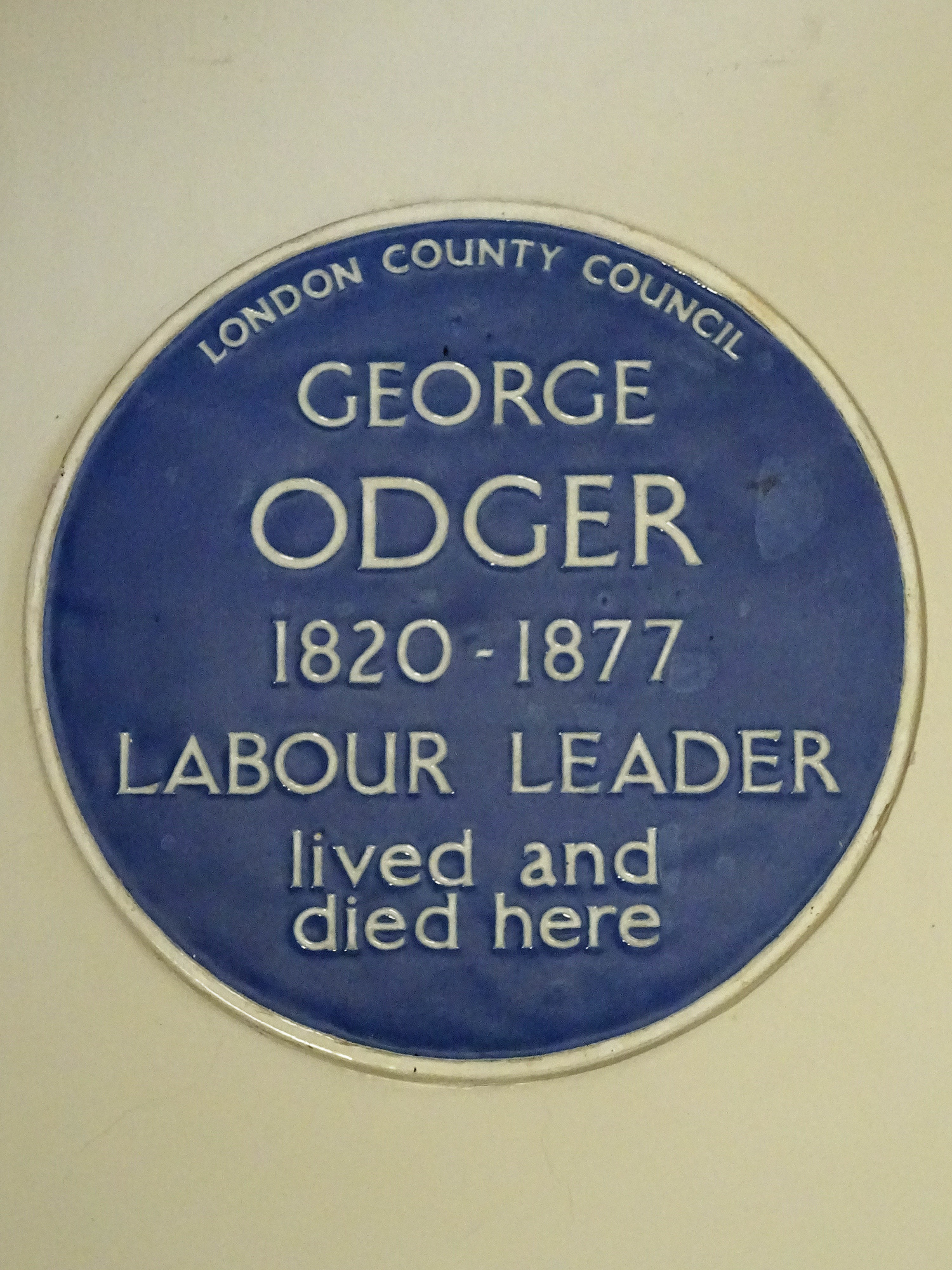
Blue plaque inside St Giles in the Fields.

Odger died on 4 March 1877. He was remembered at the time of his death as a "good, clear writer and a fluent speaker. He was not what is called 'eloquent,' but he was better; he spoke with force, with effect, with a knowledge of his subject."

Henry James wrote of the funeral: "The element of the grotesque was very noticeable to me in the most marked collection of the shabbier English types that I had seen since I came to London. The occasion of my seeing them was the funeral of Mr. George Odger, which befell some four or five weeks before the Easter period. Mr. George Odger, it will perhaps be remembered, was an English Radical agitator of humble origin, who had distinguished himself by a perverse desire to get into Parliament. He exercised, I believe, the useful profession of a shoemaker, and he knocked in vain at the door that opens but to the refined. But he was a useful and honourable man, and his own people gave him an honourable burial."

George Odger is buried in Brompton Cemetery.

Odger is listed on the Reformers' Memorial in Kensal Green Cemetery in London. Odger Street on the John Burns' Latchmere Estate in Battersea is named after him.

A London County Council commemorative Blue Plaque was erected at Odger's former residence, 18 St Giles High Street, in the 1950s. After this house was demolished in the 1970s the plaque was rescued and can now be seen in the lobby of St Giles in the Fields having been placed there in 1974.

== Footnotes ==
Trade union offices
Preceded by George Howell	Secretary of the London Trades Council; 1862–1872	Succeeded by George Shipton
Preceded by George Potter	Secretary of the Parliamentary Committee of the TUC; 1872–1873	Succeeded by George Howell
