= Henry Slatter =

Henry Slatter, in 1891

Henry Slatter (15 October 1830 – 5 July 1902) was a British trade union leader.

Born in Cheltenham, Slatter moved with his family to Birmingham when he was five years old, and was educated at a Unitarian Mutual Improvement School. He completed an apprenticeship as a printer before relocating to Manchester, where he worked for the Manchester Examiner and Times.

Slatter was a founder of the Typographical Association, and joined its executive after its headquarters moved to Manchester in 1863. In 1869, he was elected as the union's general secretary. Under his leadership, the union began offering benefits to members who could not find work, and started a pension scheme. He also represented the union at the Trades Union Congress (TUC), serving on the Parliamentary Committee of the TUC for many years, as its chairman in 1879 and its treasurer from 1886. He resigned from the Parliamentary Committee in 1890, in protest at the victory of the supporters of New Unionism in that year's votes.

In 1883, Slatter was appointed as a magistrate, one of the first working-class magistrates in Manchester. He was also a founder of the Co-operative Printing Society.

Slatter retired in 1897, and his union awarded him a pension of £100 per year. He died in 1902.

Trade union offices
Preceded by Henry Roberts	General Secretary of the Typographical Association; 1869 – 1897	Succeeded by Richard Hackett
Preceded by John D. Prior	Chairman of the Parliamentary Committee of the Trades Union Congress; 1879 – 1880	Succeeded by William Crawford
Preceded by John Burnett	Treasurer of the Trades Union Congress; 1886 – 1890	Succeeded by William Inskip
Preceded by C. J. Drummond	President of the Printing and Kindred Trades Federation; 1892 – 1897	Succeeded by A. W. Jones
