= John D. Prior =

British trade unionist

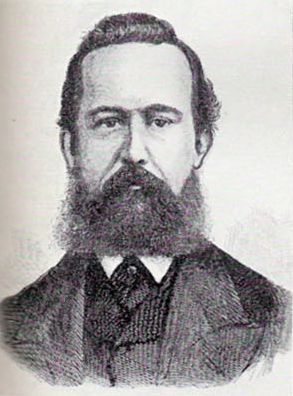
Prior, while in office

John Damrel Prior (10 March 1840 – 4 February 1923) was a British trade unionist and chairman of the Parliamentary Committee of the Trades Union Congress from 1876 until 1879.

Born in Shebbear in Devon, Prior was educated at Shebbear College. He became interested in trade unionism, and by the mid-1860s, was a prominent figure in the Amalgamated Society of Carpenters and Joiners (ASC&J), serving on the executive of the "Junta"'s Conference of Amalgamated Trades.

In 1871, Prior succeeded Robert Applegarth as general secretary of the ASC&J. As Prior was based in Manchester, the union's headquarters was relocated to the northern city. A large minority of the union's branches refused to accept his election but, with the support of Applegarth, Prior asserted his control.

While general secretary, Prior was regularly elected to the Parliamentary Committee of the Trades Union Congress, serving as its chairman from 1876 until 1879.

In 1881, Prior was appointed as a factory inspector, the first worker to hold the post. He resigned from his trade union posts, and worked as an inspector until his retirement in 1905. He enjoyed a long retirement, celebrating his diamond wedding in 1921.

Trade union offices
Preceded by Robert Applegarth	General Secretary of the Amalgamated Society of Carpenters and Joiners; 1871 – 1881	Succeeded by J. S. Murchie
Preceded by John Kane	Chairman of the Parliamentary Committee of the Trades Union Congress; 1876 – 1879	Succeeded by Henry Slatter
