= William Owen (trade unionist) =

British trade unionist, journalist and political activist

William Owen (6 December 1844 – 11 October 1912) was a British trade unionist, journalist and political activist.

Owen was born in Burslem in Staffordshire. His father, John Owen, had been involved in local trade unionism since the 1830s, and claimed that they were related to Robert Owen. Although his family were Anglicans, Owen joined the Methodist church in his youth.

Owen completed an apprenticeship as a pottery turner, but also taught himself shorthand and by the middle of the 1860s, he had become a journalist. In 1867, he was appointed as editor of the Potteries Examiner and Workman's Advocate, the journal of the United Branches of Operative Potters, a local trade union. He tried to turn the publication into a more general labour movement newspaper, printing articles about developments in other trades, national and international news, and even works of literature.

Owen followed his father in promoting trade unionism, and supported A. J. Mundella's efforts to set up industrial arbitration boards. In 1868, a Potteries Board was established, and Owen was appointed as its first secretary. He attended early Trades Union Congress (TUC) meetings to promote the idea of formalised arbitration and conciliation, and was elected to the Parliamentary Committee of the TUC in 1873, though he was only in post for a year. He devoted much of the early 1870s attempting to form an international union for pottery workers, although this attracted little interest outside the local area.

In 1873, Owen launched a new paper, the Labour Press, Miners' and Workmen's Examiner, with the intention that this would provide much of the material for a series of local labour newspapers around the country. This was initially successful, leading him to resign from the Potteries Examiner in 1874, and move to Wolverhampton, continuing to publisher the Examiner and also launch the new Wolverhampton Times. However, circulation gradually fell; in 1877, all the publications were consolidated into the Midland Examiner and Wolverhampton Times, promoting more orthodox liberal politics, and this closed two years later. Owen returned to Staffordshire, settling in Hanley, where he again took over the Potteries Examiner, but this closed in 1880, and he thereafter launched a string of largely unsuccessful papers, the Staffordshire Knot being the most enduring.

Owen became active in the local Liberal Party, and was elected to Hanley Town Council. At the 1886 United Kingdom general election, he stood in Sheffield Ecclesall, where he was defeated, taking 2,688 votes to the winner's 3,930. He renewed his links with local unions, and was the leading figure in a major strike of potters in 1881; this destroyed the United Branches, but Owen founded a new National Order of Potters in 1882 as its replacement. He was linked with the union for many years, and was again a leading figure during a lock-out in 1892.

Owen retired in 1897, although he continued to write newspaper articles, principally on the topic of arbitration.
