= George Shipton =

British trade unionist

George Shipton (1839 – 14 October 1911) was a prominent British trade unionist.

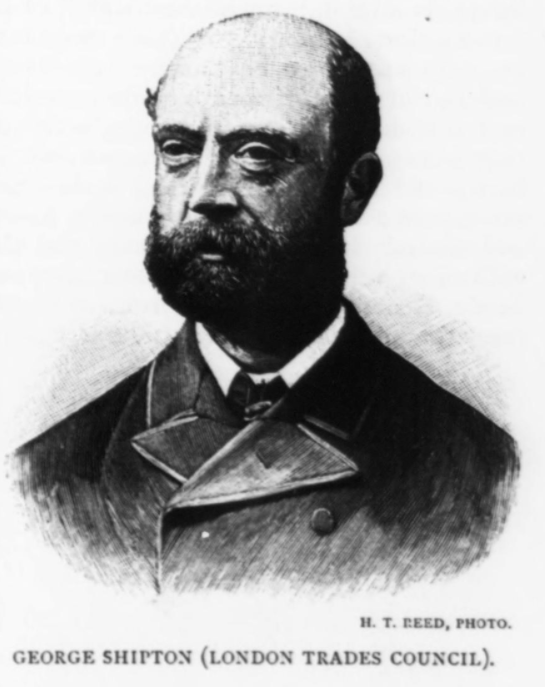
George Shipton in 1889

== Trade union activity ==
Shipton worked as a builder and became involved in trade unionism by joining the Land and Labour League, where he became a strong supporter of George Odger. In 1872, he was elected as the General Secretary of the London Trades Council. In 1873, he became the first leader of the London Amalgamated Painters union, a post he held until 1889.

In 1878, Shipton travelled to Paris, leading the English delegation at an early international labour conference. In February 1880, he stood as an independent Radical candidate in a by-election in Southwark coming third with 799 votes.

== The Labour Standard ==
The London Trades Council had broken links with The Bee-Hive, their previous journal, in 1865, and it had ceased publication in 1878. In 1881, they resolved to establish their own newspaper, The Labour Standard, and named Shipton as its editor. He initially ran with a series of lead articles by Friedrich Engels. He resigned in 1884, being replaced by William Barnett.

In 1885, Shipton was elected as the Secretary of the Parliamentary Committee of the Trades Union Congress (TUC), the post which later became the General Secretary.

== New Unionism ==
In the late 1880s, Shipton opposed the New Unionism. Although the universal franchise was some years off, he claimed that "when the people were unenfranchised, were without votes, the only power left to them was the demonstration of numbers. Now, however, the workmen have votes." In 1890, Tom Mann and Ben Tillett, proponents of the New Unionism wrote a document entitled The "NEW" Trade Unionism: a reply to Mr George Shipton. He was defeated for the Secretaryship of the Parliamentary Committee of the TUC, but remained the Secretary of the London Trades Council until 1896.

== Other activities ==
Shipton was co-opted as a member of the London School Board on 18 December 1890, but stood down at the next elections, in 1891.

Trade union offices
Preceded by George Odger	Secretary of the London Trades Council; 1872–1896	Succeeded by James MacDonald
Preceded by E. G. Davies	General Secretary of the Amalgamated Society of House Decorators and Painters; 1866–1889	Succeeded by E. C. Gibbs
Preceded by Daniel Guile	Treasurer of the Trades Union Congress; 1875–1879	Succeeded by John Burnett
Preceded by Henry Broadhurst	Secretary of the Parliamentary Committee of the TUC; 1885–1886	Succeeded by Henry Broadhurst
Preceded by William Crawford	Chairman of the Parliamentary Committee of the TUC; 1888–1889	Succeeded by James Swift
