= James Stafford Murchie =

British trade unionist

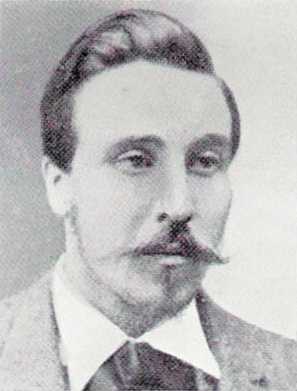
Murchie, while in office

James Stafford Murchie (c.1850 – 12 September 1888), usually known as J. S. Murchie, was a British trade unionist.

Born in Carlisle, Murchie moved to Manchester with his family while young, and became a carpenter. Known for his wide reading on trade and social matters, he became active in the Amalgamated Society of Carpenters and Joiners (ASC&J), and quickly rose in importance. In 1876, he chaired the union's strike committee during major industrial action, and he was soon elected as chair of the union's executive committee. In 1881, aged only 31, he was elected to succeed John D. Prior as general secretary.

While in office, Murchie became active in the Trades Union Congress (TUC); he served on the Parliamentary Committee of the TUC, chairing it in 1885. The ASC&J held annual elections, and Murchie was re-elected each year.

Murchie was also politically active, supporting the Liberal Party, although he never sought political office.

In 1888, Murchie attended the TUC, at which he spoke, and was again re-elected to the Parliamentary Committee. He had been suffering from an illness connected with his liver for some time, and while at the TUC, suffered a haemorrhage, returning home to recuperate. However, he died early in the morning of 12 September.

Trade union offices
Preceded by John D. Prior	General Secretary of the Amalgamated Society of Carpenters and Joiners; 1880 – 1888	Succeeded by Francis Chandler
Preceded by Alfred Bailey	Chairman of the Parliamentary Committee of the Trades Union Congress; 1885	Succeeded by James Mawdsley
