= James Swift (trade unionist) =

James Swift (1841 or 1842 – March 1904) was a British trade unionist.

Swift was elected as general secretary of the Steam Engine Makers' Society in 1874. The craft union he headed, though fairly small, was one of the longest-established trade unions in the UK. Based in Manchester, Swift soon became one of the best-known trade unionists in the region. He represented the union at the Trades Union Congress (TUC), being elected to the Parliamentary Committee of the TUC in 1886, and as its Chairman in 1889.

Swift strongly opposed the New Unionism of the 1890s, and lost his seat on the Parliamentary Committee, but was happy to take a prominent role in industrial disputes alongside the Amalgamated Society of Engineers. In 1895, he was appointed as a Justice of the Peace, and also became a Visiting Justice at Strangeways Prison.

Trade union offices
Preceded by Joseph Scotson	General Secretary of the Steam Engine Makers' Society; 1874 – 1904	Succeeded by William F. Dawtry
Preceded by George Shipton	Chairman of the Parliamentary Committee of the Trades Union Congress; 1889	Succeeded by Edward Harford
