= Alfred Bailey (trade unionist) =

Alfred W. Bailey (1828 or 1829 – 22 September 1886) was an early British trade unionist.

Living in Preston, Bailey came to prominence in the 1860s as an advocate of the establishment of a national trade union federation. He attended the United Kingdom Alliance of Organised Trades conference in 1867, representing the Preston and Blackburn branches of the newly founded Amalgamated Society of Journeymen Tailors (ASJT). He was elected as vice-president of the ASJT and, later in 1867, was arrested along with the other leaders of the union, on a charge of conspiracy to impoverish business owners during a strike. Bailey was found guilty, and bound over to keep the peace. Soon afterwards, he was elected as President of the ASJT.

Bailey was not discouraged from trade union activity and, in 1868, he attended the first Trades Union Congress, representing Preston Trades Council. At the congress, he read a paper by George Potter which made a forceful case for trade unionism, and has often been quoted as if it were his own words.

Bailey thereafter attended the TUC each year. He was elected to its Parliamentary Committee more often than not, and served as its chairman in 1874 and 1883. In 1883, he was one of three British delegates to the International Trades Union Congress in Paris, alongside Henry Broadhurst and John Burnett.

By the mid-1880s, Bailey was in poor health. He attended the 1886 TUC, but was unable to take part in its activities. He was taken home after it closed, and he died one week later.

Trade union offices
Preceded by Alexander Macdonald	Chairman of the Parliamentary Committee of the TUC; 1874–1875	Succeeded by Robert Knight
Preceded by William Count and James Fitzpatrick	Auditor of the Trades Union Congress; 1879; With: Duncan Kennedy	Succeeded by Neil McLean and John Smyth
Preceded by John Inglis	Chairman of the Parliamentary Committee of the TUC; 1883–1884	Succeeded by James Stafford Murchie
