= James Mawdsley (trade unionist) =

British trade unionist (1848–1902)

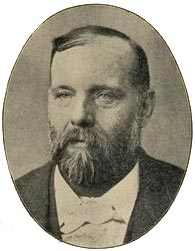
Mawdsley c. 1899

James Mawdsley (9 January 1848 – 4 February 1902) was an English trade unionist. Alongside Winston Churchill, he stood as a Conservative Party candidate in the double Oldham by-election of 1899. He was born in Preston, Lancashire, to cotton spinner James Mawdsley and his wife, Jane.

From the age of 9, the young James worked in a cotton mill as a "half-timer" (he spent half the working day in the mill and half at school). By the age of 16, he was working full-time.

In 1871, Mawdsley married Ann Wright, and they had seven children together. In 1878, he became the General Secretary of the Amalgamated Association of Operative Cotton Spinners. At the time, cotton spinners were considered an elite group by other union factions. Shortly after his appointment he led the operatives in south east Lancashire in a strike against a 20% reduction in wages, securing 5% of this back in early 1880. In 1885 south east Lancashire employers sought a 10% reduction in wages. Again compromise was reached and a 5% reduction imposed.

In 1886, the Association worked with the Amalgamated Association of Card and Blowing Room Operatives and the Northern Counties Weavers Amalgamation to form the United Textile Factory Workers Association; the collaboration was brought about because the unions desired to promote legislation. Mawdsley became General Secretary. Under his leadership, the UTFWA was regarded as a sober and moderate union, which was opposed to socialism.

Through much of the 1880s and 1890s, Mawdsley sat on the Trades Union Congress (TUC)'s parliamentary committee and was chairman of the TUC in 1885. Mawdsley was politically active; in line with most other cotton workers but against the majority of trade unionists, Mawdsley was a supporter of the Conservative Party.

In 1895 there was a nascent plan for Mawdsley to stand for Parliament as a Conservative, in conjunction with David Holmes of the Weavers' union as a Liberal, both being regarded as Labour representatives.

In 1899, a double by-election was held in Oldham. Mawdsley was chosen as a candidate, alongside future British Prime Minister, Winston Churchill. Mawdsley was unusual as a Conservative Party candidate, who was also heavily involved in trade unions. He was also one of the first trade unionists to be associated with.

Mawdsley died in 1902 at Taunton, Ashton-under-Lyne from complications following an accident. His injuries were sustained by sitting in a china bath and breaking it.

He was buried at Christ Church, Ashton-under-Lyne.

Trade union offices
Preceded by J. S. Murchie	Chairman of the Parliamentary Committee of the TUC; 1886–1887	Succeeded by James Millar Jack
Preceded by Thomas Birtwistle	Secretary of the United Textile Factory Workers' Association c. 1892–1902	Succeeded by Joseph Cross
Preceded by New position	General Secretary of the International Federation of Textile Workers; 1893–1895	Succeeded by Ferdinand Hardijns
Preceded by John Burns and David Holmes	Trades Union Congress representative to the American Federation of Labour; 1895; With: Edward Cowey	Succeeded by John Mallinson and Sam Woods
