= James Millar Jack =

Scottish trade unionist and politician

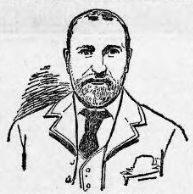
Jack in 1895

James Millar Jack (1847 or 1848 – 28 September 1912) was a Scottish trade unionist and politician.

Jack came to prominence as a member of the Associated Iron Moulders of Scotland (AIMS), and was elected as its general secretary in November 1879. He also represented the union at the Trades Union Congress (TUC), and was elected to the TUC's Parliamentary Committee in 1884. He chaired the committee in 1887, and was re-elected most years until 1896.

Jack was also interested in the political representation of workers, and was appointed as a vice-president of the Labour Electoral Association. In 1890, he was elected to Glasgow Town Council, with the backing of the Glasgow Trades Council. He was only the second Liberal-Labour representative on the council.

Under Jack, AIMS was a founding member of the Federation of Engineering and Shipbuilding Trades, and Jack served as its president for many years until his unexpected death in 1912.

Trade union offices
| Preceded by John Fraser | General Secretary of the Associated Iron Moulders of Scotland; 1879 – 1912 | Succeeded by John Brown |
| Preceded by George Sedgwick and Peter Shorrocks | Auditor of the Trades Union Congress; 1883; With: Thomas Sharples | Succeeded by Thomas Ashton and John Wilson |
| Preceded by James Mawdsley | Chairman of the Parliamentary Committee of the Trades Union Congress; 1887 | Succeeded by William Crawford |
| Preceded by Robert Knight | President of the Federation of Engineering and Shipbuilding Trades c.1900 – 1912 | Succeeded by John Hill? |
