= Amalgamated Society of House Decorators and Painters =

Former trade union of the United Kingdom

- Merged into: National Amalgamated Society of Operative House and Ship Painters and Decorators
- Founded: 1866
- Dissolved: 1904
- Headquarters: Club Union Buildings, Clerkenwell Road, London
- Location: England
- Members: 5,165 (1900)
- Key people: George Shipton (Gen Sec)
- Affiliations: TUC

The Amalgamated Society of House Decorators and Painters (ASHDP) was a trade union representing painters and decorators in the London area of England. The union repeatedly tried to expand across the country, but was ultimately unsuccessful in doing so.

== History ==
The union was founded in 1866 as the London General Association of Amalgamated House Painters. It was formed by various local unions which were undertaking a strike for increased wages. They had previously worked together in the London Central House Painters' and Decorators' Trade Union, but that union had insufficient funds to support strikers.

George Shipton had, for some years, been advocating for painters' unions to unite, and within a few days of the formation of the union, he was appointed as its second general secretary. Under his leadership, the union eclipsed the Central House Painters, although that union continued with a small membership until 1904. Despite being based in London, it briefly formed branches in Cardiff and Dundee. The Manchester Alliance of Operative House Painters was also recruiting members in London, under the name of the London Council of Painters. Shipton formed an alliance with the Manchester Alliance, the two working together as the "Amalgamated Society of House Decorators and Painters".

The union charged high membership fees of 1 shilling per week, and also paid high benefits to members who found themselves out of work. However, it found that many of them, once re-employed, left the union. By 1868, it had only 420 members, and this fell further, with the union becoming largely moribund by 1871.

In 1873, Shipton reorganised the union, under the Amalgamated Society of House Decorators and Painters name. On formation, it had 341 members in London, Southampton, Swansea and Waterford. Subscriptions and benefit payments were set at lower rates, and the union began a gradual growth, reaching 663 members in 1876, 1,067 in 1886, and 5,165 in 1900.

The East London Painters' Trade Union represented ship painters, and it organised a strike in 1900 in an attempt to bar Amalgamated Society members from their trade. In retaliation, the Amalgamated reached an agreement with the shipyards to bar members of the East London union, which by the end of the year was defeated and forced to merge into the Amalgamated.

In 1904, the union merged into the National Amalgamated Society of Operative House and Ship Painters and Decorators.

== General Secretaries ==
1866: E. G. Davies
1866: George Shipton
1889: Edwin Caleb Gibbs
