= Thomas Birtwistle =

Thomas Birtwistle (16 October 1833 – 22 March 1912) was an English trade unionist and factory inspector.

Born in Great Harwood, Lancashire, he worked in a cotton mill from the age of six, becoming a power-loom weaver at the age of fourteen. In spite of limited education, he had a flair for mathematics and was skilled at working out the complicated the way cotton workers were paid. This led to involvement in the early trade union movement where he worked to enable British trade unions to gain recognition, respectability, and responsibility in the second half of the 19th century. He died in Accrington.

== Union activity ==
He was a leading figure during the 1858 lock-out at Great Harwood. When there were strikes at Padiham in 1859) and Colne in 1860, he was elected to the council of the new North-East Lancashire Powerloom Weavers' Association. This enable co-operation between works in different towns. In 1861 he became its full-time secretary, and held the post until 1892.

He represented the North East Association at the Trades Union Congress from 1872 and was on its parliamentary committee from 1875-1889, and was its chairman in 1881.

In 1885, he became one of the country's first working-class JPs.

In 1892, however, he was appointed by the government as a factory inspector (duties now carried out by the Health and Safety Executive), responsible for implementing parts of the Factory and Workshop Act 1891.

== Personal life ==
He married a fellow weaver, Ellen Butterworth, who predeceased him, when he was 20. He died at his home, 17 St James's Street, Accrington, on 22 March 1912 and was buried in Accrington cemetery. He was survived by his second wife, Mary.

Trade union offices
| Preceded by William Crawford | Chairman of the Parliamentary Committee of the TUC; 1881 – 1882 | Succeeded by John Inglis |
| Preceded by New position | Secretary of the North East Lancashire Amalgamated Weavers' Association; 1861 – 1892 | Succeeded by E. J. Holmes |
| Preceded by New position | Secretary of the Amalgamated Weavers' Association; 1884 – 1885 | Succeeded by William Henry Wilkinson |
| Preceded by New position | Secretary of the United Textile Factory Workers' Association; 1889 – 1892 | Succeeded by James Mawdsley |
