= Liberal-Labour (UK) =

- Leader: Thomas Burt
- Founder: George Odger
- Founded: 17 February 1870
- Dissolved: 14 December 1918
- National affiliation: Liberal Party

The Liberal–Labour movement was the practice of local Liberal associations accepting and supporting candidates who were financially maintained by trade unions. These candidates stood for the British Parliament with the aim of representing the working classes, while remaining supportive of the Liberal Party in general.

The first Lib–Lab candidate to stand was George Odger in the 1870 Southwark by-election. The first Lib–Lab candidates to be elected were Alexander MacDonald and Thomas Burt, both members of the Miners' Federation of Great Britain (MFGB), in the 1874 general election. In 1880, they were joined by Henry Broadhurst of the Operative Society of Masons and the movement reached its peak in 1885, with twelve MPs elected. These include William Abraham (Mabon) in the Rhondda division whose claims to the Liberal nomination were essentially based on his working class credentials.

The candidates generally stood with the support of the Liberal Party, the Labour Representation League and one or more trade unions. After 1885, decline set in. Disillusion grew from the defeat of the Manningham Mills Strike, a series of decisions restricting the activity of unions, culminating in the Taff Vale Case and largely unchallenged by the Liberal Party, and the foundation of the Independent Labour Party in 1893 followed by its turn towards trade unionism.

The formation of the Labour Representation Committee in 1900, followed by the Labour Party in 1906, meant that in the House of Commons, there were two groups of MPs containing trade union–sponsored MPs, sitting on either side of the chamber (about 28 took the Labour whip and about 23 took the Liberal whip). The Trades Union Congress decided to instruct its affiliate unions to require their MPs to stand at the next election as Labour Party candidates and take the Labour whip. Of the 23 trade union–sponsored Liberal MPs, 15 were sponsored by unions affiliated to the Miners Federation of Great Britain (MFGB). When the MFGB affiliated to the Labour Party in 1909, most of their MPs joined Labour after the January 1910 general election.

The Liberal-Labour group finally died out at the 1918 general election, when Thomas Burt (by then Father of the House) and Arthur Richardson stood down.

== List of Liberal-Labour MPs ==
Name	Constituency	Union	From	To	Notes
William Abraham	Rhondda	SWMF/MFGB	1885	1910 Jan	Joined the Labour Party in 1910
Joseph Arch	North West Norfolk	NALU	1885	1886	
Joseph Arch	North West Norfolk	NALU/None	1892	1900	
William Brace	Glamorganshire, South	MFGB	1906	1909	Joined the Labour Party in 1909
Henry Broadhurst	Stoke-upon-Trent	Masons	1880	1885	
Henry Broadhurst	Birmingham Bordesley	Masons	1885	1886	
Henry Broadhurst	Nottingham West	Masons	1886	1892	
Henry Broadhurst	Leicester	Masons	1894	1906	
John Burns	Battersea	Local committee	1892	1905	Sat as a Liberal after joining the Henry Campbell-Bannerman cabinet. Retires as MP in 1918.
Thomas Burt	Morpeth	NMA/MFGB	1874	1918	
William Pollard Byles	Shipley	None	1892	1895	
Herbert James Craig	Tynemouth	None	1906	1918	
William Crawford	Mid Durham	DMA	1885	1890	
Randal Cremer	Haggerston	ASCJ	1885	1895	
Randal Cremer	Haggerston	ASCJ	1900	1908	
John Charles Durant	Stepney	None	1885	1886	
Enoch Edwards	Hanley	MFGB	1906	1909	Joined the Labour Party in 1909
Charles Fenwick	Wansbeck	NMA/MFGB	1885	1918	
Frederick Hall	Normanton	MFGB	1905	1909	Joined the Labour Party in 1909
William Edwin Harvey	North East Derbyshire	MFGB	1907	1910 Jan	Joined the Labour Party in 1910
John George Hancock	Mid Derbyshire	MFGB	1909	1918	Joined Labour Party 1910. Re-joined Liberal Party 1915.
John George Hancock	Belper	MFGB	1918	1923	Sat as a Liberal.
George Howell	Bethnal Green North East	Operative Bricklayers	1885	1895	
John Hagan Jenkins	Chatham	Associated Shipwrights	1906	1906	Joined the Labour Party soon after election
John Johnson	Gateshead	MFGB	1904	1910 Jan	
William Johnson	Nuneaton	MFGB	1906	1909	Joined the Labour Party in 1909; Liberal from 1914
Barnet Kenyon	Chesterfield	MFGB	1913	1929	Broadly a Liberal after 1918
Joseph Leicester	West Ham South	Glassmakers	1885	1886	
Alexander Macdonald	Stafford	MNA	1874	1881	
Fred Maddison	Sheffield Brightside	Typographical Association	1898	1900	
Fred Maddison	Burnley	Typographical Association	1906	1910 Jan	
George Nicholls	North Northamptonshire	NUAW	1906	1910 Jan	
William Parrott	Normanton	MFGB	1904	1905	
Ben Pickard	Normanton	YMA/MFGB	1885	1904	
Arthur Richardson	Nottingham South	Local committee	1906	1910 Jan	
Arthur Richardson	Rotherham		1917	1918	
Thomas Richards	West Monmouthshire	MFGB	1904	1909	Joined the Labour Party in 1909
James Rowlands	Finsbury East	None	1886	1895	
Albert Stanley	North West Staffordshire	MFGB	1907	1910 Jan	Joined the Labour Party in 1910
W. C. Steadman	Stepney	Barge Builders	1898	1900	
W. C. Steadman	Finsbury Central	Barge Builders	1906	1910 Jan	
Henry Harvey Vivian	Birkenhead	ASCJ	1906	1910 Dec	
John Wadsworth	Hallamshire	MFGB	1906	1910 Jan	Joined the Labour Party in 1910
John Williams	Gower	MFGB	1906	1909	Joined the Labour Party in 1909
Havelock Wilson	Middlesbrough	Sailors and Firemen	1892	1900	
Havelock Wilson	Middlesbrough	Sailors and Firemen	1906	1910 Jan	
John Wilson	Houghton-le-Spring	DMA	1885	1886	
John Wilson	Mid Durham	DMA/MFGB	1890	1915	
Sam Woods	Ince	MFGB	1892	1895	
Sam Woods	Walthamstow	MFGB	1897	1900	

== See also ==
- Category:Liberal-Labour (UK) politicians
- Category:Liberal-Labour (UK) MPs
