= Steam Engine Makers' Society =

Former trade union of the United Kingdom

- Merged into: Amalgamated Engineering Union
- Founded: 1824
- Dissolved: 1920
- Headquarters: 17 Thomas Street, Manchester
- Location: United Kingdom
- Members: 17,800 (1914)
- Affiliations: TUC, FEST

The Steam Engine Makers' Society (SEM) was an early trade union representing engineers in the United Kingdom.

The union was founded in Liverpool in 1824, and was able to meet openly in Manchester by 1826, despite the Combination Act 1825 severely limiting the role of trade unions; it was one of a very few unions able to operate successfully at the time. The union opposed Chartism, and suspended any branches which attempted to work with the Chartist movement.

The union had 525 members by 1836, unusually for the time included both skilled and unskilled workers. It was the second largest union invited to amalgamated into the new Amalgamated Society of Engineers in 1851 (after the Journeymen Steam Engine, Machine Makers' and Millwrights' Friendly Society), but voted against, fearing that it would be effectively taken over by the larger union. Instead, it remained independent, growing to 6,000 members by 1891, when it was a founder of the Federation of Engineering and Shipbuilding Trades.

The union continued to grow in the 20th-century, reaching 17,800 members in 1914. In 1920, it finally agreed to merge with the ASE and some smaller unions, forming the Amalgamated Engineering Union.

== General Secretaries ==
Joseph Scotson
1871: James Swift
1904: William F. Dawtry
