= London Trades Council =

Former trade union of the United Kingdom

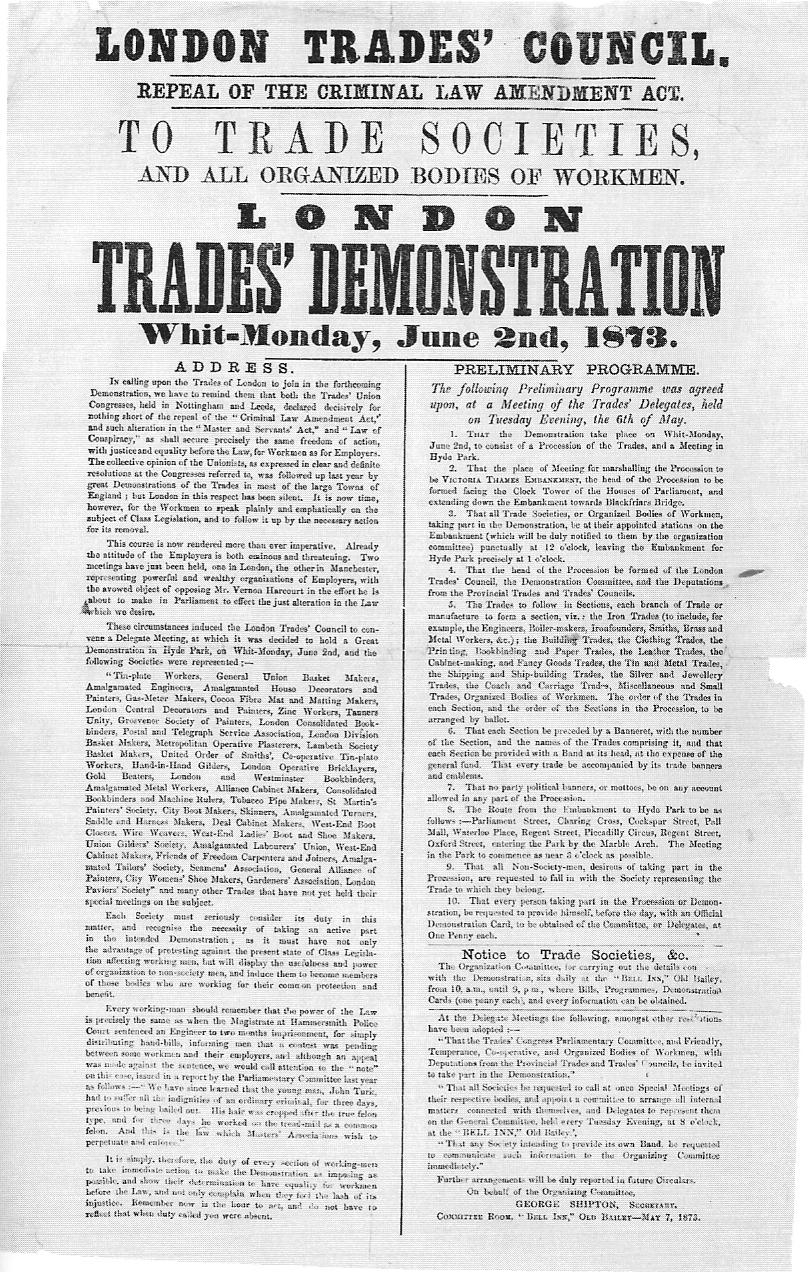
Poster issued by the London Trades Council, advertising a demonstration held on 2 June 1873.

The London Trades Council was an early labour organisation, uniting London's trade unionists. Its modern successor organisation is the Greater London Association of Trades (Union) Councils

== History ==
Leading figures in the London trade union movement convened occasional meetings of the "Metropolitan Trades Delegates" from 1848, meeting at the Old Bell Inn by the Old Bailey. The London builders' strike of 1859 required ongoing co-ordination, and it was determined to organise a trades council.

The formation of the London Trades Council was organised at George Potter's Building Trades Conference and led by George Odger's Operative Bricklayers' Society. The unions agreed to demand a maximum working day of nine hours from their employers. The employers refused, resulting in strike action and a lockout. Eventually the unions conceded, but the solidarity built prompted the formation of a citywide body able to co-ordinate future action.

The London Trades Council was founded at a meeting at Shaftesbury Hall on 18 May 1860, and it may well have been the fourth such organisation in the country, after the Sheffield Trades Council and Glasgow Trades Council (both founded in 1858) and the Edinburgh Trades Council (founded in 1859). The council charged affiliates two shillings per hundred members, and thereby covered its expenses. By 1862, it had a paid membership of 11,300, although attendees at its various meetings represented unions with a total of around 50,000 members.

Through the early 1860s, many individuals who later became prominent in the national trade union movement won seats on the executive of the council: Heap (ASE), George Howell, Edwin Coulson, George Odger, Goddard (Bookbinders), Robert Applegarth, Daniel Guile, and later Robert Allan. It supported unions in numerous conflicts in London, with the builders' strike of 1861 proving particularly successful, but its support for the South Staffordshire Miners did not achieve success, and Potter's unilateral efforts to support North Staffordshire members of the National Association of Ironfounders in 1865 led to his isolation on the council.

As the national Trades Union Congress (TUC) was not founded until 1868 (largely as a response by Trades Councils in Northern England to the perceived dominance of the London Trades Council), the London body initially provided a focus for many national campaigns, and its early leaders became known as the "Junta". It campaigned for the right of working men to vote, for legislation to improve working conditions, and for a Conciliation and Arbitration Act. It also supported the Glasgow Trades Council's campaign against the Master and Servant Act. However, its support for the United Kingdom Alliance of Organised Trades, founded just before the Sheffield Outrages, did not bear fruit, and the Council were not officially represented at the TUC until its second conference.

The Council co-operated closely with the International Workingmen's Association (sometimes referred to as the First International), but voted against affiliating to the body.

With the growth of the TUC, the London Trades Council lost its national leadership role, but remained the most important trades council in the country. Odger devoted more time to the TUC, and George Shipton became the secretary of the council, launching the Labour Standard as its newspaper, giving particular support to the National Fair Trade League.

London was the main centre of the New Unionism from 1888, but the council was dominated by craft unionists, and initially had little to do with the movement. Despite this, in 1890, 38 new unions affiliated to the council, the largest being the dockers, almost doubling its membership to 59,192. More radical figures were elected to its executive: Fred Hammill, Tom Mann, James Macdonald, W. Pearson and H. R. Taylor. This led to serious disputes over strategy, with Shipton resigning in 1896, to be replaced by Macdonald.

One complaint of the new unions was that the council was overly centralised, and in response, local trades councils formed across London, starting with the West Ham Trades and Labour Council in 1891. The new unions persuaded the London Trades Council to form a lecture bureau, and to campaign for an eight hour day, with the first May Day demonstration taking place in Hyde Park in 1890.

The trades council supported the formation of the London County Council, and initially supported the Progressive Party, with John Burns and F. C. Baum of the upholsterers winning early seats on the council. It led a large campaign in 1892, which saw Ben Cooper, Will Steadman and Henry Robert Taylor elected. However, by 1895 it felt the Progressive Party was insufficiently radical, and in 1897 it began working with the Independent Labour Party (ILP) and Social Democratic Federation (SDF). The SDF opposed all non-socialist candidates, and so for the 1898 elections, the trades council ended up putting together its own recommended list, a mixture of trade unionists and ILP members.

In 1901, the council appointed a political committee, consisting of W. B. Cheesman, Cooper, A. E. Holmes, Charles Jesson, J. Jones (brassworkers), Sam Michaels and Harry Orbell. In 1903, the council affiliated to the national Labour Representation Committee, although it initially continued to support some other candidates; at the 1906 UK general election, it supported nine candidates including Harry Quelch of the SDF and C. Norton of the Liberal Party. This changed in 1914, when it played a leading role in establishing the London Labour Party, which affiliated to the Labour Party.

The council was divided over support for World War I, but agreed in its opposition to conscription. After the war, it became increasingly radical; in 1926, A. M. Wall defeated the leading communist Wal Hannington for the secretaryship by only 102 votes to 82. It led the organisation of workers in London during the 1926 UK general strike.

In 1953, the council was derecognised by the TUC, which was seeking to purge Communist Party influence in the Trades Councils nationally. A new London Trades Council (1952) was founded, alongside a London Federation of Trades Councils.

== Leadership ==
=== Secretaries ===
1860: Tom Jones
1861: George Howell
1862: George Odger
1872: George Shipton
1896: James MacDonald
1913: Fred Knee
1914: John Stokes
1917: Duncan Carmichael
1926: Alfred M. Wall
1938: Robert Willis
1945: Julius Jacobs

=== Chairs ===
1860: John D. Nieass (Plasterers)
1862: George Odger
1863: Mildred (Carpenters and Joiners)
as of 1867: Robert Danter (Engineers)
as of 1869: John Jeffery (Bricklayers)
as of 1873: T. Warren (West End Boot Closers)
as of 1885: Thomas Abrey (Perseverance Carpenters)
as of 1893-1894: George Courtenay
1896: Ben Cooper (Cigar Makers)
1899: Joe Gregory (Masons)
1904: Harry Quelch (Compositors)
1906: Harry Gosling (Watermen)
1910: Harry Quelch (Compositors)
1913: John Stokes (Glassblowers)
1914: Edward Friend (Bookbinders)
1940: George Lindgren (Railway Clerks)
1942: Jock Tiffin (Transport Workers)
1948: Geoffrey Collings (Railway Clerks)
1950: Ted Sheehan (Transport Workers)
1951: Fred Tonge (Transport Staff)
1952: Mark Bass (Fire Brigades)

=== Treasurers ===
1860: John Heap (Engineers)
1870s: H. R. King (Bookbinders)
by 1892: W. C. Steadman (Barge Builders)
1910s: Ben Cooper (Cigar Makers)
1917: John Stokes (Glassblowers)
1942: Harry Hynd (Railway Clerks)
1946: Henry Levitt (Insurance Officials)
1951: W. N. Chellingworth (Bookbinders)
1952: David Henry Lewis (Medical Practitioners)

== See also ==
- History of trade unions in the United Kingdom
