= William Crawford (trade unionist) =

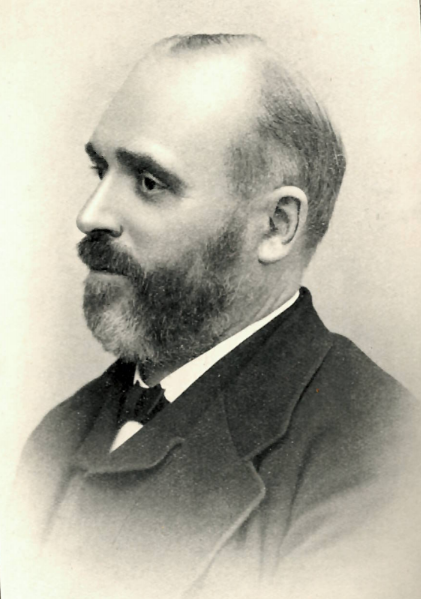
Crawford in the 1880s

William Crawford (1833 – 1 July 1890) was an English miner, trade unionist, and a Liberal politician.

Crawford was born at Cullercoats Northumberland and worked in Hartley Coal Mines from the age of 10. In 1862 he actively opposed the attempt of the Northumberland mine owners to impose the system of yearly hiring. He became Secretary of the Durham Miners' Association in 1863, and spoke frequently at the Durham Miner's Gala He was briefly secretary of the breakaway Northumberland Miners' Mutual Confident Association.

In 1885 Crawford was elected Member of Parliament for Mid Durham and held the seat until his death aged 57. From 1889 to 1890 he was a member of the Institute of Mining Engineers. Crawford was a chief promoter of the College of the Venerable Bede, Durham and acted as its treasurer until his death.

Parliament of the United Kingdom
New constituency	Member of Parliament for Mid Durham; 1885 – 1890	Succeeded by John Wilson
Trade union offices
Preceded by New position	Secretary of the Northumberland Miners' Association; 1864	Succeeded by Thomas Burt
Preceded by William Crake	President of the Durham Miners' Association; 1870–1871	Succeeded by John Forman
Preceded by A. Cairns	General Secretary of the Durham Miners' Association; 1871–1890	Succeeded by William Hammond Patterson
Preceded by Thomas Halliday	Secretary of the Miners' National Union; 1877 – 1890	Succeeded by John Wilson
Preceded by Henry Slatter	Chairman of the Parliamentary Committee of the TUC; 1880 – 1881	Succeeded by Thomas Birtwistle
Preceded by James Millar Jack	Chairman of the Parliamentary Committee of the TUC; 1887 – 1888	Succeeded by George Shipton
