= Iron, Steel and Wood Barge Builders and Helpers Association =

Former trade union of the United Kingdom

Barge Builders Union
- Iron, Steel and Wood Barge Builders' and Helpers' Association
- Merged into: Transport and General Workers Union
- Founded: 1872
- Dissolved: 1973
- Headquarters: 32 Woolwich Road, London
- Location: United Kingdom
- Members: 400 (1890)
- Key people: Will Steadman
- Affiliations: TUC, GFTU

The Iron, Steel and Wood Barge Builders and Helpers Association was a trade union in the United Kingdom. It was founded in 1872 as the Barge Builders Trade Union, also known as the River Thames Barge Builders Trade Union, and adopted this title in 1940. Its initial membership was about 90 and rose to 400 by 1890. The General Secretary from 1879 to 1908 was William Charles Steadman, who was also councillor for Stepney on the London Chamber of Commerce and MP for Stepney. By 1945 the union's membership had increased to 863, before falling again to 526 in 1967. The Association merged with the Transport and General Workers' Union in 1973.

== General Secretaries ==
1879: W. C. Steadman
1908: Thomas H. Challis
1934: T. Nelan
1947: W. H. Harris

== See also ==
- Transport and General Workers' Union
- TGWU amalgamations
