= Amalgamated Society of Carpenters and Joiners =

UK trade union

- Merged into: Amalgamated Society of Woodworkers, Federation of Industrial Manufacturing and Engineering Employees, United Brotherhood of Carpenters and Joiners of America
- Founded: 1860
- Dissolved: 1921
- Location: United Kingdom, Ireland, United States of America, Australia, Canada
- Members: 65,000 (1900)
- Key people: Robert Applegarth (General Secretary), Alexander Gordon Cameron (General Secretary)
- Affiliations: TUC

The Amalgamated Society of Carpenters and Joiners (ASC&J) was a New Model Trade Union in the 1860s in the United Kingdom, representing carpenters and joiners.

== History ==
The formation of the Society was spurred by the Stonemason's strike, 1859, which succeeded in winning a nine-hour day. In 1860, a number of small societies formed the Amalgamated. Robert Applegarth was the general secretary from 1862 to 1871.

The union also established branches in the United States, Australia, and Canada. The United Brotherhood of Carpenters and Joiners of America took over its U.S. branches in 1913, and the United Brotherhood of Carpenters and Joiners took over its Australian branches in 1917.

By 1892, the union had 37,588 members, and by 1900 it had 65,000. It merged with or absorbed a number of smaller unions including the Carpenters of Dublin, the Carpenteres of Cork, the Mersey Ship Joiners and other small unions in Britain and Ireland in the 1890s. In 1911, it merged with the Associated Carpenters and Joiners of Scotland, while in 1918 the Amalgamated Union of Cabinetmakers joined the union, which renamed itself as the Amalgamated Society of Carpenters, Cabinetmakers and Joiners. In 1921, the union merged with the General Union of Carpenters and Joiners, forming the Amalgamated Society of Woodworkers

== United States ==
The union established a branch in New York City in 1867. In 1870, a second branch was opened in New York, plus new branches in St Louis and Chicago, followed in 1871 by branches in Cleveland and Fall River, Massachusetts. It recruited principally from recent immigrants from the UK, although by the end of the century, most of its members had been born in the United States.

The United Brotherhood of Carpenters and Joiners of America was founded in 1881, and initially, the two unions co-operated. In 1890, the ASC&J was admitted to the American Federation of Labor (AFL). However, the United Brotherhood grew as it involved itself in industrial disputes, while the ASC&J focused on providing welfare benefits to members. By 1900, the ASC&J in the United States had 3,011 members. The United Brotherhood argued that the local branches of the ASC&J should merge into the United Brotherhood. In 1903, a committee chaired by Adolph Strasser proposed the two unions merge on an equal basis; this was supported by the ASC&J, but rejected by the United Brotherhood.

In 1912, the AFL ordered that the ASC&J accept the United Brotherhood's term; when it would not, the federation suspended the British union. The following year, the ASC&J agreed that the United Brotherhood would have jurisdiction over its members in trade matters, while the ASC&J would retain its existence and provide welfare benefits to its members. This arrangement endured until 1923, when the United Brotherhood claimed that the ASC&J branches were seeking to regain their independence. The large majority of ASC&J members accepted offers to take up full membership of the United Brotherhood.

== Election results ==
The union sponsored Labour Party candidates in each Parliamentary election from 1906 onwards.

| Election | Constituency | Candidate | Votes | Percentage | Position |
|---|---|---|---|---|---|
| 1905 by-election | Belfast North | William Walker | 3,966 | 47.2 | 2 |
| 1906 general election | Belfast North | William Walker | 4,616 | 48.5 | 2 |
| 1906 general election | Westhoughton | William Tyson Wilson | 9,262 | 60.2 | 1 |
| 1907 by-election | Belfast North | William Walker | 4,194 | 41.1 | 2 |
| 1910 Jan general election | Leith Burghs | William Walker | 2,724 | 18.9 | 3 |
| 1910 Jan general election | Liverpool Kirkdale | Alexander Gordon Cameron | 3,921 | 48.6 | 2 |
| 1910 Jan general election | Westhoughton | William Tyson Wilson | 9,064 | 53.2 | 1 |
| 1910 by-election | Liverpool Kirkdale | Alexander Gordon Cameron | 3,427 | 44.5 | 2 |
| 1910 Dec general election | Jarrow | Alexander Gordon Cameron | 4,892 | 30.6 | 3 |
| 1910 Dec general election | Westhoughton | William Tyson Wilson | 9,064 | 53.2 | 1 |
| 1918 general election | Kingston upon Hull North West | Alfred Gould | 3,528 | 19.3 | 3 |
| 1918 general election | Walthamstow West | Valentine McEntee | 4,167 | 29.3 | 2 |
| 1918 general election | Westhoughton | William Tyson Wilson | 11,849 | 63.9 | 1 |
| 1918 general election | Willesden West | Samuel Viant | 7,217 | 37.2 | 2 |
| 1918 general election | Woolwich West | Alexander Gordon Cameron | 7,088 | 34.5 | 2 |

== Leadership ==
=== General Secretaries ===
1860: J. Lea
1862: Robert Applegarth
1871: John D. Prior
1881: James S. Murchie
1888: Francis Chandler
1919: Alexander Gordon Cameron

=== Assistant General Secretaries ===
1915: Alexander Gordon Cameron
1920: Frank Wolstencroft
