= John Burnett (trade unionist) =

John Burnett (21 June 1842 – 30 January 1914) was an English trade unionist.

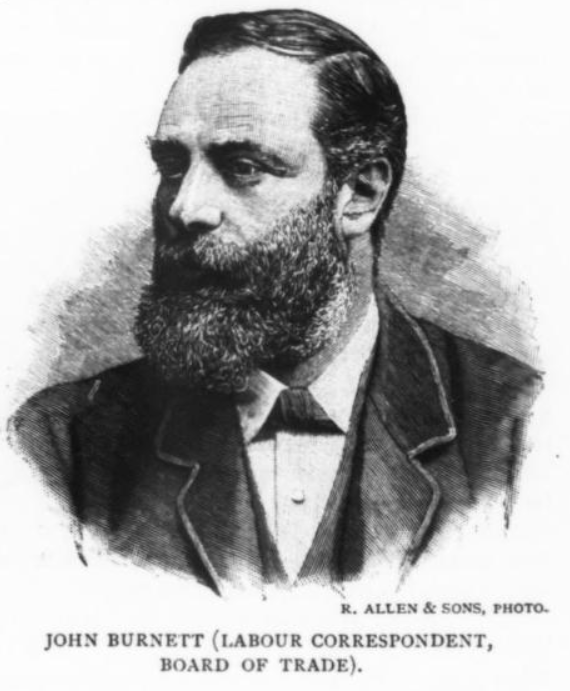
John Burnett, 1890

Born at Alnwick in Northumberland, Burnett was an illegitimate son of John Burnett, a shoemaker, and Margaret Anderson. He was educated at the Duke of Northumberland's Charity School until he was orphaned at the age of twelve. He then went to live with an uncle on Tyneside, where he worked running errands. Two years later, he started an engineering apprenticeship, also studying courses at the Mechanics' Institute in his spare time.

Burnett became an active trade unionist. During the 1860s, he was involved with campaigns for Parliamentary reform, and for a half-holiday on Saturdays. He was a leader of the Nine Hours League, and in 1871, when he was working at William Armstrong's Elswick Works, where he led a strike from May to October demanding the nine-hour day. Public opinion was favourable, and donations from the public and trade unionists totalling £2000 enabled the men to stay out until the strike was won, in October. In addition, Burnett persuaded James Cohn from the International Working Men's Association to come to Tyneside and convince strikebreakers, many brought in from overseas, to leave.

Although Burnett was unable to return to work for Armstrong, Joseph Cowen found him work at the Newcastle Daily Chronicle. He was also active in the Amalgamated Society of Engineers, and in 1875, he was elected as its general secretary, following the death of William Allan. He also served on the Parliamentary Committee of the Trades Union Congress, and from 1879 was elected annually as its treasurer.

Burnett was a critic of the apparent impact of Jewish immigration upon domestic labour standards, arguing in 1887 that ‘these aliens have chiefly been German and Russian Jews, and there can be no doubt that the result has been to flood the labour market of the East End of London with cheap labour to such an extent as to reduce thousands of native workers to the verge of destitution’.

In 1885, A. J. Mundella persuaded Burnett to give up his trade union posts and join the Board of Trade. There, he wrote reports on sweatshops before serving as joint secretary of the Royal Commission on Labour from 1892 to 1894, then returning to the Board of Trade as Chief Labour Correspondent, his principal roles being the production of statistics and arbitration in disputes. In 1890, he represented the labour perspective on the four-man British government delegation to the first international labour conference in Berlin.

Burnett retired in 1907, but served from 1909 until his death as a member of the Tailoring Board.

Trade union offices
Preceded by William Allan	General Secretary of the Amalgamated Society of Engineers; 1875–1885	Succeeded by Robert Austin
Preceded by George Shipton	Treasurer of the Trades Union Congress; 1879–1886	Succeeded by Henry Slatter
