= George Howell (trade unionist) =

English trade unionist and reform campaigner (1833 – 1910)

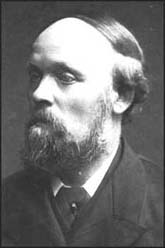
- Born: 5 October 1833; Wrington, England
- Died: 17 September 1910 (aged 76); Shepherd's Bush, London, England
- Occupation: Trade unionist

George Howell (5 October 1833 – 17 September 1910) was an English trade unionist and reform campaigner and a Lib-Lab politician, who sat in the House of Commons from 1885 to 1895.

== Biography ==
George Howell was born in Wrington, Somerset, the eldest of eight children of a builder and contractor. He was educated at a Church of England primary school in Bristol until the age of twelve, when he began work with his father, who owned a small builders. By the week he worked twelve hours a day as a mortar-boy, and later a bricklayer, but dedicated Sundays to reading. Among his favourite books were John Foxe's Book of Martyrs and John Bunyan's The Pilgrim's Progress.

Howell grew to dislike his work as a builder so became an apprentice shoemaker. Some of the men he worked with were active chartists and introduced him to radical newspapers including the Northern Star and the Red Republican. As a result, he joined the chartist movement in 1848. Others of his colleagues were Methodists, and Howell attended some of their meetings at Wrington Chapel, before becoming a lay preacher. He also became involved in the local temperance movement.

Howell moved to London in 1854 where he resumed work as a bricklayer, unable to find employment as a shoemaker. He attended many radical political meetings and met prominent radical thinkers of the day, including Karl Marx, George Holyoake, Charles Bradlaugh and Frederic Harrison. He joined the Operative Bricklayers' Society (a New Model Trade Union) in 1859, and played a part in leading the London builders' strike in support of a nine-hour working day. Through his work with the union he became one of the foremost New Model unionists, along with Robert Applegarth and George Potter, but was blacklisted by employers for five years.

He was elected, along with Potter and Applegarth, to the executive of the London Trades Council (LTC) in 1861 and became its secretary. He also became involved in the campaign for universal suffrage, becoming full-time secretary of the Reform League in 1865. Howell organised demonstrations in London in 1866 and 1867, and played an important role in the campaign behind the Representation of the People Act 1867. However, Howell was not satisfied with the scale of the reform and continued to campaign for universal suffrage.

In 1871 Howell was appointed secretary of the Trades Union Congress (TUC), and regularly contributed to the trade unionist journal The Bee-Hive as well as publishing a number of books throughout the 1870s.

Howell stood for parliament unsuccessfully at Aylesbury in the general elections of 1868 and 1874 and at Stafford in a by-election in 1881. He finally succeeded in 1885 as Lib–Lab candidate for Bethnal Green North East, London. In Parliament, Howell helped to pass the Merchant Shipping Act 1894 (57 & 58 Vict. c. 60) and successfully defended his seat in 1886 and 1892 but was defeated by Conservative candidate Mancherjee Bhownagree in 1895.

In poor health, Howell retired from public life. During his retirement, his old friend Robert Applegarth and the TUC raised a £1650 testimonial to buy him an annuity. On 17 September 1910, he died at 35 Findon Road, Shepherd's Bush, and was buried at Nunhead Cemetery.

== Notable works ==
- A Handy Book of Labour Laws 1876
- The History of the International Working Men's Association 1878
- Conflicts of Capital and Labour 1878
- Trade Unionism New and Old 1891
- Labour Legislation, Labour Movements and Labour Leaders 1902

Parliament of the United Kingdom
New constituency	Member of Parliament for Bethnal Green North East; 1885–1895	Succeeded by Mancherjee Bhownagree
Trade union offices
Preceded by Tom Jones	Secretary of the London Trades Council; 1861–1862	Succeeded by George Odger
Preceded by George Odger	Secretary of the Parliamentary Committee of the TUC; 1873–1876	Succeeded by Henry Broadhurst
