= National Society of Metal Mechanics =

Former trade union of the United Kingdom

- Merged into: Technical, Administrative and Supervisory Section
- Founded: 1872
- Dissolved: 1985
- Headquarters: 70 Lionel Street, Birmingham
- Location: United Kingdom
- Members: 50,494 (1982)
- Key people: William John Davis (General Secretary)
- Publication: Metal Mechanics News
- Affiliations: TUC, Labour

The National Society of Metal Mechanics (NSMM) was a trade union in the United Kingdom which existed between 1872 and 1985.

== History ==
The organisation was founded in Birmingham in 1872 as the Amalgamated Brassworkers Society. Led for many years by William John Davis, it was soon renamed the National Society of Amalgamated Brassworkers. In 1919, members rejected a proposal to join the Amalgamated Society of Engineers, and instead chose to expand the union's remit, renaming the body as the National Society of Brass and Metal Mechanics. By 1920, it had 37,363 members, but it suffered during the Great Depression, and this figure fell to 15,000 by 1937.

In 1985, the union merged with the Technical, Administrative and Supervisory Section; at this point, its membership was 27,000.

== General Secretaries ==
1872: William John Davis
1883:
1888: William John Davis
1921: Arthur H. Gibbard
1940s: Arthur Penny
1955: V. M. Robus
1962: Frank Briggs
1975: J. H. Wood
1981: Charles P. McCarthy
