= John Burns =

English trade unionist and politician

The Right Honourable John Burns
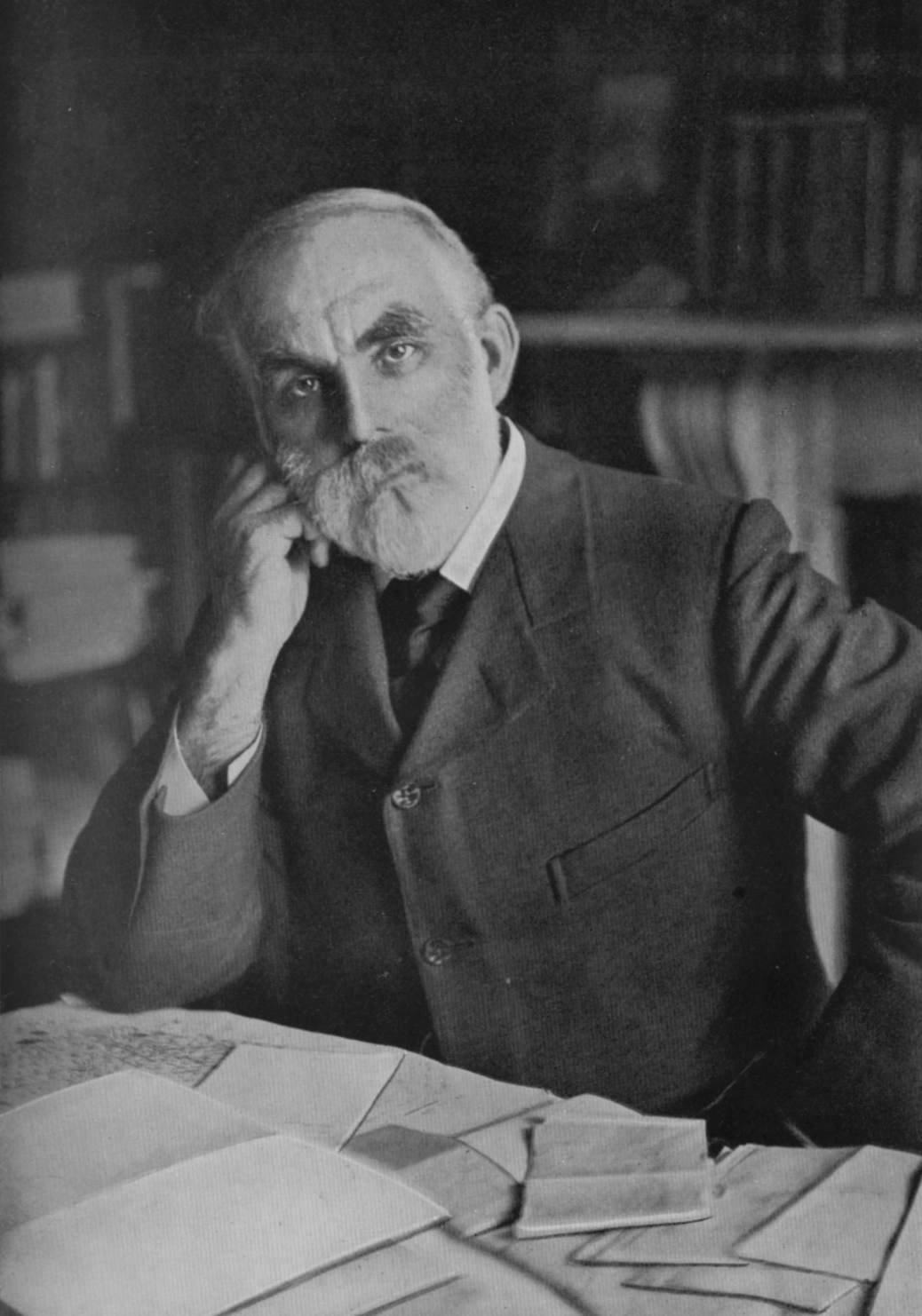
- Burns, circa 1911

President of the Board of Trade
- In office 11 February 1914 – 5 August 1914
- Prime Minister: H. H. Asquith
- Preceded by: Sydney Buxton
- Succeeded by: Walter Runciman

President of the Local Government Board
- In office 10 December 1905 – 11 February 1914
- Prime Minister: Sir Henry Campbell-Bannerman; H. H. Asquith
- Preceded by: Gerald Balfour
- Succeeded by: Herbert Samuel

Personal details
- Born: 20 October 1858 Vauxhall, London, England
- Died: 24 January 1943 (aged 84)
- Citizenship: United Kingdom

John Elliot Burns (20 October 1858 – 24 January 1943) was an English trade unionist and politician, particularly associated with London politics and Battersea. He was a socialist and then a Liberal Member of Parliament and Minister. He was anti-alcohol and a keen sportsman. When the Liberal cabinet made a decision for war on 2 August 1914, he resigned and played no further role in politics. After retiring from politics, he developed an expertise in London history and coined the phrase "The Thames is liquid history".

== Early life ==
Burns was born in London in 1858, the son of Alexander Burns, a Scottish fitter, growing up with his railwayman father in a house at 80 Grant Road, Battersea on what is now the Winstanley and York Road Estates. He attended a national school in Battersea until he was ten years old. He then had a succession of jobs until he was fourteen years old and started a seven-year apprenticeship to an engineer at Millbank and continued his education at night-schools. He read extensively, especially the works of Robert Owen, John Stuart Mill, Thomas Paine and William Cobbett. A French fellow-worker, Victor Delahaye, who had been present during the Paris Commune introduced him to socialist ideas, and Burns claimed that he was converted because he found the arguments of J. S. Mill against it to be insufficient. He began practising outdoor speaking, with the advantage of exceptional physical strength and a strong voice.

In 1878, he was arrested and held overnight for addressing an open-air demonstration on Clapham Common. He worked at his trade in various parts of England, having joined the Amalgamated Society of Engineers in 1879. In 1881 he formed a branch of the Social Democratic Federation (SDF) in Battersea. He worked on a ship, and went for a year to the West African coast at the mouth of the Niger as a foreman engineer for the United Africa Company. He disapproved of treatment of Africans and spent his earnings on a six months' tour to study political and economic conditions in France, Germany and Austria.

== Radical politics ==
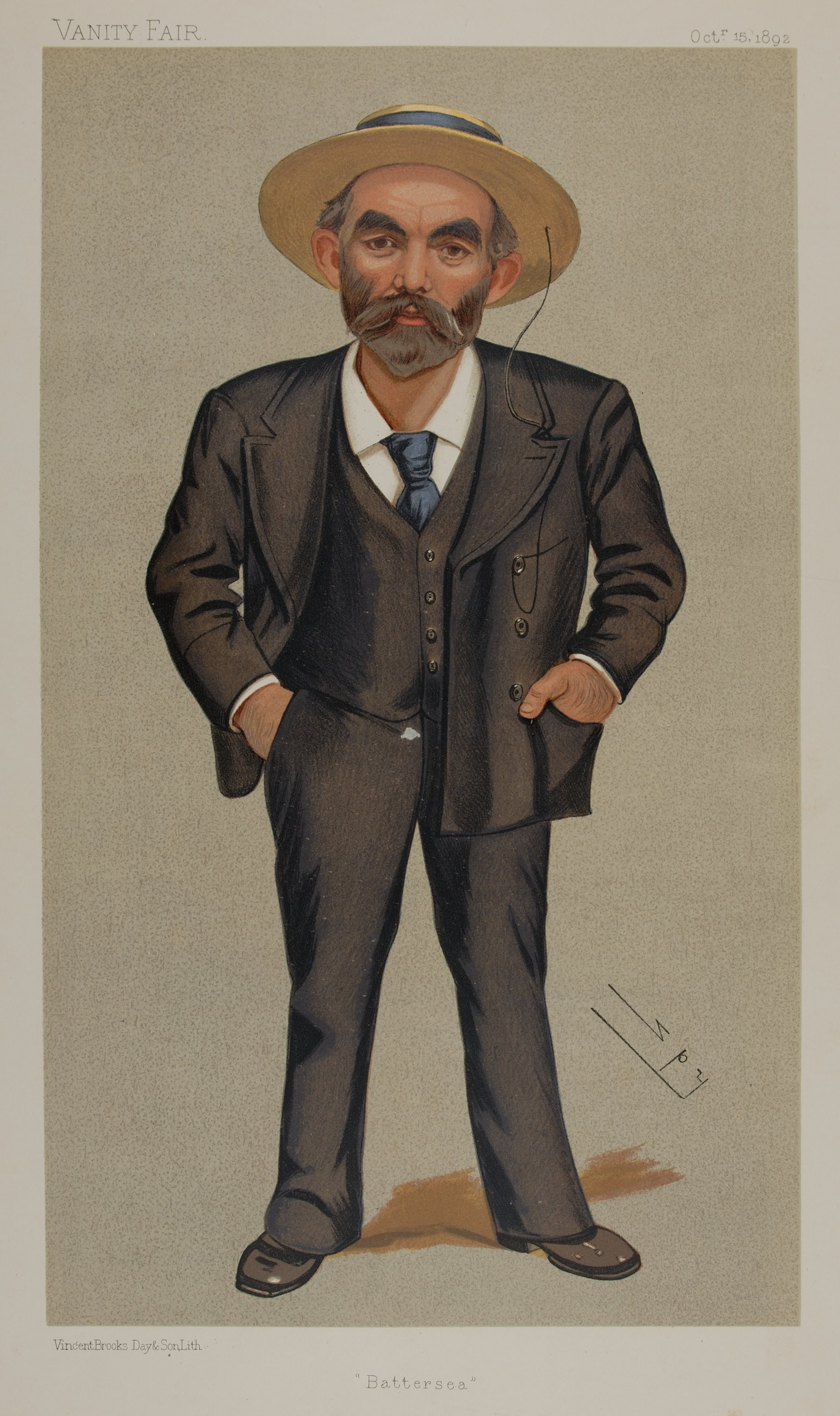
Caricature of Burns in Vanity Fair, October 1892, wearing the straw hat for which he was famous during the 1889 Dock Strike.

In 1884 Burns was elected to the Social Democratic Federation's executive council. At the Industrial Remuneration Conference of 1885 he made some interventions that attracted attention.

He stood for Parliament in the 1885 General Election at Nottingham West but was unsuccessful. A year later, he took part in a London demonstration against unemployment which resulted in the West End riots when the windows of the Carlton Club and other London clubs were broken, where he encouraged rioters to loot bakeries. He was arrested and later acquitted at the Old Bailey of charges of conspiracy and sedition. He was arrested again the following year on 13 November 1887 for resisting police attempts to break up an unlicensed meeting in Trafalgar Square. The demonstration ended in the 'Bloody Sunday' clashes; Burns was imprisoned for six weeks.

In August 1889, Burns played a major part in the London Dock Strike. He was the most effective of the strikers' speakers, and each day after the meeting he led the strikers on a five abreast march through the City of London, wearing his trademark straw hat. By this time he had left the SDF and, with fellow socialist Tom Mann, was focusing on trade union activity as a leader of the New Unionist movement. With other London radicals such as Ben Tillett, Will Crooks, Ben Cooper and John Benn, Burns ('The Man with the Red Flag') helped win the dispute. He was still working at his trade in Hoe's printing machine works and was an active member of the executive of the Amalgamated Engineers' Union.

In 1889, he became a Progressive member of the first London County Council for Battersea. He was supported by his constituents, who subscribed an allowance of £2 a week. He devoted his efforts against private monopolies and introduced a motion in 1892 that all contracts for the County Council should be paid at trade union rates and carried out under trade union conditions. As a local politician, Burns is particularly noted for his role in the creation of Battersea's Latchmere Estate, the first municipal housing estate built using a council's own direct labour force, officially opened in 1903. He was connected with the Trades Union Congresses until 1895.

== Parliamentary career ==
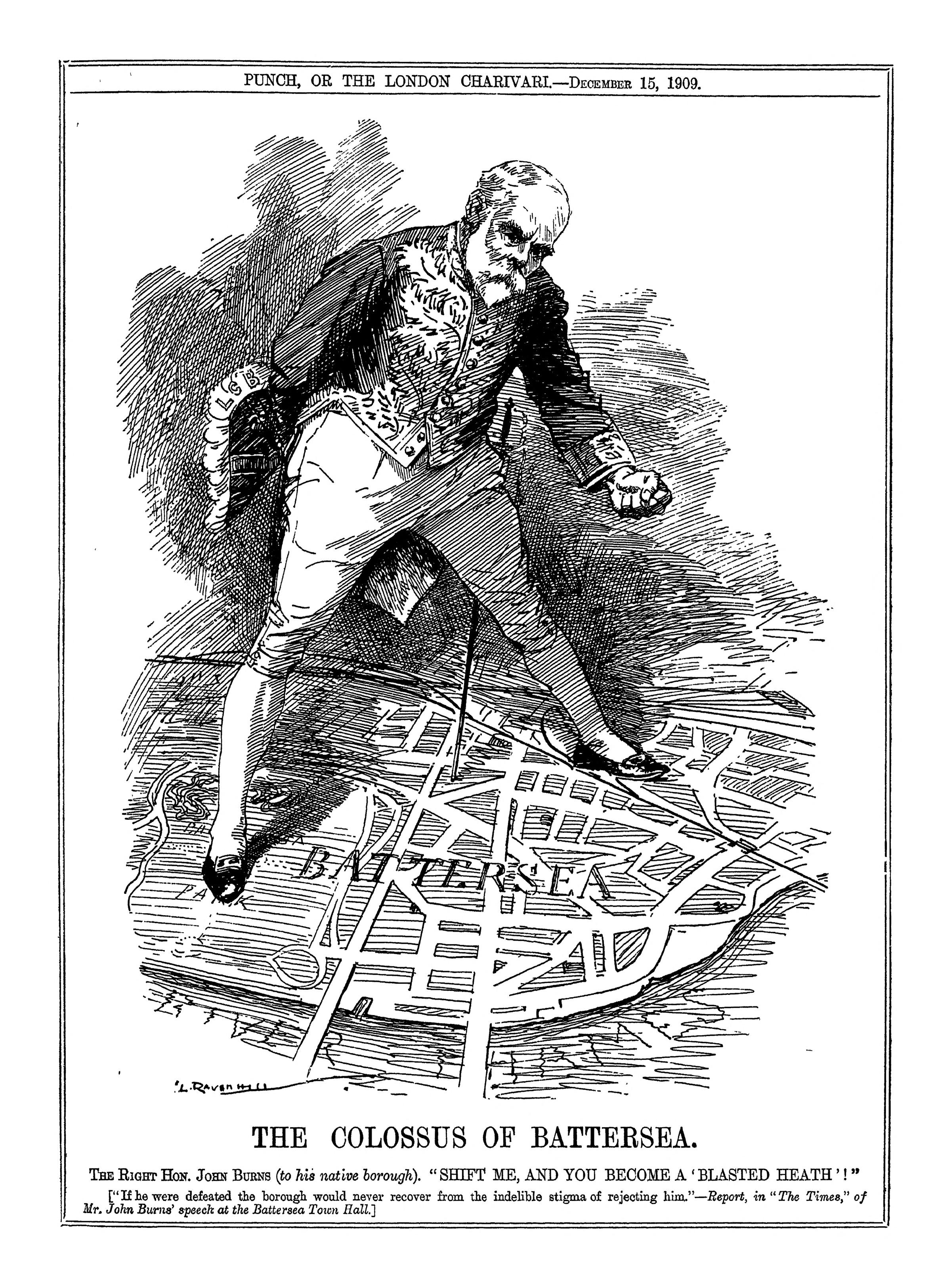
Burns as the Colossus of Battersea, in a 1909 Punch cartoon by Leonard Raven-Hill

Sing a Song of Sixpence,
Dockers on the strike.
Guinea pigs are hungry,
As the greedy pike.
Till the docks are opened,
Burns for you will speak.
Courage lads, and you'll win,
Well within the week.

— London dockworkers in 1889

In 1892, he was elected as Member of Parliament for Battersea as the candidate of the Battersea Liberal Association. He displayed fervent Parliamentary opposition to the Second Boer War (1900).

Burns became well known as an independent Radical, but while fellow socialist Keir Hardie argued for the formation of a new political party, Burns remained aligned with the Liberal Party. In December 1905 Campbell-Bannerman included him in the cabinet as President of the Local Government Board, the second workingman (after Henry Broadhurst) to serve as a government minister. Burns remained proud of his working-class roots, declaring to the Commons in a speech in 1901: "I am not ashamed to say that I am the son of a washerwoman". Whilst an MP he voted in favour of the 1908 Women's Enfranchisement Bill. He received praise for his administrative policy and was retained in the government after H. H. Asquith became Prime Minister in 1908. He was sworn into the Privy Council in 1905.

In 1914 Burns was appointed President of the Board of Trade, but on 2 August 1914, just two days before Britain declared war on Germany, signalling the start of the First World War, Burns resigned from the government in protest. He played no role in the war and left parliament in 1918.

According to one observer, Burns had long believed "that poverty and its related problems were the combined outcome of individual failure and an inadequate social environment. This was reinforced by a strong streak of puritanism which expressed itself in his opposition to smoking, drinking, and gambling." He is also said to have spoken out in opposition to the gradual development of what would become known as the Welfare State, arguing in 1913 that charitable organisations and government "should not 'supersede the mother, and they should not by over-attention sterilise her initiative and capacity to do what every mother should be able to do for herself.'" Burns was also critical of proposals for labour exchanges, after having previously supported them back in 1893, suspecting (as noted by one study) "that they would be used to depress wages and beat strikes." He also had misgivings about certain philanthropic and relief works, as Burns declared during a parliamentary discussion in 1908:

I am giving that serious and significant fact to warn the House and the working classes throughout the country that indiscriminate charity and mistaken philanthropy at other people's expense, and relief works badly organised and badly conducted, make for universal bankruptcy in the interests of universal loaferdom. I say that because I have unique, intimate, and practical knowledge of this subject; because I have gone through the New Cut, Lambeth, through Poplar, through Limehouse Reach, and Ratcliffe Highway, feeling the pulse of the people, and seeing the extent to which under the guise of political reform, social amelioration, and economic change, good and kindly but uneducated people are having their morale and independence sapped to an extent which, if it were spread throughout the whole of the country, would make the East End of London and elsewhere dependent and subjected, and often as free from work, as certain sections in Belgravia and Mayfair.

Despite these criticisms and characterisations of Burns, and despite his shortcomings, he was nevertheless ideologically progressive, believing not only in the right of workers to a living wage but also supportive of forward-looking reforms such as those related to old-age pensions, insurance for invalidity and unemployment, meals for schoolchildren, wage levels, and improving the availability and conditions of housing.

== Antisemitism ==
Burns has been described as an antisemite by scholars of Jewish history such as David Feldman, Colin Holmes, Robert Wistrich and Anthony Julius.

His opposition to the Second Boer War was interconnected with his personal antisemitism, making repeated references to the "trail of the financial serpent", declaring at an anti-war rally at Battersea Park in 1900 that "the South African Jew has…no bowels of compassion…every institution and class had been scheduled by the Jew as his heritage, medium and dependent. Where he could not intimidate, he corrupted; where he could not corrupt, he defamed…[the Boers] defend their land, not from a nation armed, vindicating a righteous cause, but against a militant capitalism that is using our soldiers as the uniformed brokers’ men turning out the wrong tenants in South Africa for the interests of the Jews...with wisdom foresight and kindliness, we may yet retain South Africa for the Empire and humanity, even though we may lose it for the Jews".

Later, Burns declared in Parliament that "wherever we examine, there is the financial Jew, operating, directing, inspiring the agencies that have led to this war". Wistrich has compared this conspiratorial antisemitism to that which spread during France during the time of the Dreyfus Affair.

Burns deplored the British Army which had, in his view, been transformed from the "Sir Galahad of History" into the "janissary of the Jews". In 1902, Burns further denounced "syndicated Jews who don't fight but do know how to rob".

He remarked during a tour of the East End that "the undoing of England is within the confines of our afternoon’s journey amongst the Jews". In 1900, David Lindsay recorded Burns telling him that he believed that the "Jew is the tapeworm of civilisation".

== Interests ==
Burns was a non-drinker and enthusiast for sporting activity. He was a long-time lover of cricket, being a regular at The Oval and Lord's, and sustained severe injuries being hit in the face by a cricket ball while watching a match in 1894.

In 1919 he was left an annuity of £1000 by Andrew Carnegie which left him financially independent and he spent the rest of his life devoted to his interests in books, London history and cricket. As a book collector, he created a very large private library, much of which he left to University of London Library. He developed an acknowledged expertise in the history of London, and in 1929, when an American compared the River Thames unfavourably with the Mississippi, he responded "The St Lawrence is water, the Mississippi is muddy water, but the Thames is liquid history".

A collection of his papers is held at the University of London library, and embraces many of his political interests, including universal adult suffrage, working hours and conditions, employment, pensions, poor laws, temperance, social conditions, local government, South African labour, and the Boer War.

He died aged 84 and was buried in St Mary's Cemetery, Battersea Rise. His connections with Battersea are recalled by the naming of a local school and a housing estate after him, as does John Burns Drive in Barking, and one of the Woolwich Ferry vessels also carried his name.

== Sources ==
- Chisholm, Hugh, ed. (1911). "Burns, John" . Encyclopædia Britannica (11th ed.). Cambridge University Press.
- Pelling, Henry (1992) [1963]. A History of British Trade Unionism. London: Penguin. ISBN 978-0-14-013640-1.

Parliament of the United Kingdom
Preceded by Octavius Vaughan Morgan	Member of Parliament for Battersea; 1892–1918	Constituency abolished
Trade union offices
Preceded by Havelock Wilson	Chairman of the Parliamentary Committee of the Trades Union Congress; 1893	Succeeded by David Holmes
Preceded by New position	Trades Union Congress representative to the American Federation of Labour; 1894; With: David Holmes	Succeeded by Edward Cowey and James Mawdsley
Political offices
Preceded by Gerald Balfour	President of the Local Government Board; 1905–1914	Succeeded by Herbert Samuel
Preceded by Sydney Buxton	President of the Board of Trade; 1914	Succeeded by Walter Runciman
