= London builders' strike (1859) =

The strike, a subject for the consideration of the real working man (caricature in the Punch magazine, 1859)

The London builders' strike of 1859 was a strike and resulting lock out of building trade workers across London. The action did not result in any changes to working conditions, but it led to the formation of new, national trade unions in the United Kingdom.

== Background ==
In London, building trade workers had secured a maximum ten-hour working day in 1834, but despite several efforts to reduce hours either to nine per day, or to work only half days on Saturday, barely any further progress had been made. The sole exception was the strong Operative Society of Masons (OSM), whose members were generally able to finish work at 4 on Saturdays.

In 1856, building workers in Manchester secured the right to finish work at 1 on Saturdays, and this inspired those in London to start a new campaign for shorter hours. In order to gain the support of both the OSM, the Operative Bricklayers' Society (OBS), and the unorganised carpenters, a Central Board agreed in 1858 to campaign for the nine-hour working day, the movement being led by George Potter. An initial petition was refused by employers, at which point Potter organised a permanent "Conference" to continue the campaign.

The Conference began meeting in September 1858, and began attracting representatives of other building trades: painters, plasterers, and builders' labourers. The OSM walked out, preferring to campaign for an early finish on Saturdays, but soon returned, and R. W. Grey of the OSM became chair of the Conference.

In its early period, the Conference tried to persuade employers of their case by presenting "memorials" to them, and it also published "Live and Let Live", an essay by Evan Daniel in support of its cause. These tactic proved unsuccessful, and in March 1859, the Conference called delegate meetings across London, where Potter spoke. It organised a ballot of affiliates, offering three options: further agitation, which received 1,395 votes, arbitration, with 1,157 votes, and strike action, which had just 772 votes.

== Strike and lockout ==
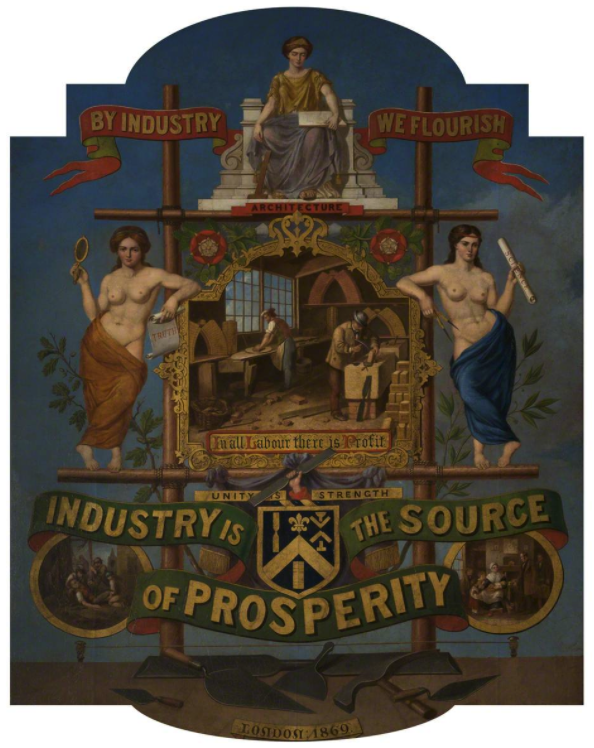
Operative Bricklayers' Society emblem (1869)

Further agitation proved equally unproductive, and in June and July, the OBS and the carpenters both voted in favour of a strike, but the OSM and its leader, Richard Harnott, remained opposed, as did the smaller unions. The Conference decided to organise a petition to employers. One petition was presented to Trollope of Pimlico, which decided to sack the leader of the delegation which presented it, a member of the OSM. The OSM then sparked into action, withdrawing all its members from work for Trollope, and on 21 July the Conference made this a strike of all building workers at Trollope's, demanding both the reinstatement of the sacked worker, and the nine-hour day.

The employers, working together as the Central Master Builders' Association, united to oppose the strike, all the larger firms locking out trade unionists within two weeks, leading to 24,000 people finding themselves without work. They would only take on employees who signed the Document, which declared that signatories would not hold membership of a trade union. Very few workers, even among non-unionists, would agree to sign this, and the Conference sent representatives to the rest of the country in an attempt to stop the deliveries of building supplies to London. To their surprise, the Conference's position was backed by some newspapers, including Reynolds' Weekly Newspaper, The Weekly Mail, and the Morning Advertiser. The master builders changed approach, asking workers to make a verbal declaration rather than sign the Document, but this too was unsuccessful.

Harnott arrived in London in September, and attempted to persuade the master builders to drop their Document, in exchange for abandoning the nine-hours policy which he had never supported. Only one company agreed to this, and while work recommenced there, Harnott left the city in defeat. Potter, by November, was ready to follow Harnott's approach, formally calling off the strike at Trollope's, and dropping the nine-hours claim, but the master builders were hopeful of success in the winter months, when less building work could be conducted, and continued their lockout.

By the end of the year, only the OSM had the funds to continue regular strike pay to its members, with the OBS managing some payments. A new Builders' Labourers' Union was founded, but had no funds to pay its striking members, and other striking workers were either unorganised, or members of very small, local unions. However, Potter was able to secure substantial donations from trade union organisations around the country, with the Amalgamated Society of Engineers leading the way by donating £3,000 (equivalent to £325,894 in 2025).. As a result, although the labourers were defeated in December, the other unions remained solid.

== Outcome ==
The master builders finally withdrew the Document on 7 February 1860. Although the unions had not advanced their position from the previous year, the experience led workers to form stronger, national unions in the unorganised trades: the Amalgamated Society of Carpenters and Joiners, National Association of Operative Plasterers, Amalgamated Society of House Decorators and Painters and United Operative Plumbers' Association of Great Britain and Ireland were all formed over the next few years, as were the London Trades Council and The Bee-Hive trades union newspaper.
