= Edwin Coulson =

British trade unionist (1828 – 1893)

Coulson, while leader of the Operative Bricklayers

Edwin Coulson (1828 – 25 June 1893) was a British trade unionist.

Born in Cambridge, Coulson came to prominence in 1861, when he took a leading role in a strike on the Great Northern Railway, representing the workers in meetings with employers. This proved successful, and the workers won the right to not be docked pay if they missed work for reasons outside their control.

Coulson joined the Operative Bricklayers' Society (OBS) in 1852 and soon moved to London, winning election as the union's general secretary in 1860. He immediately affiliated the union to the London Trades Council, and became known for his strong administrative skills. He led the union through a largely unsuccessful strike in 1861/2. Initially, he worked with George Howell, making his editor of the union journal, the OBS Monthly Trade Circular, but the two fell out, and in 1862 Howell tried to get Coulson removed from office. He was unsuccessful, but tried again repeatedly until 1870, when he resigned from the union.

As a leading figure on the London Trades Council, Coulson became known as a member of the "Junta", alongside Robert Applegarth, William Allan, Daniel Guile and George Odger. This consisted of a small committee which aimed to cautiously advance the cause of trade unionism. Of the leaders, Coulson was the most reluctant to take industrial action, and he led opposition to George Odger's more militant approach. Although Coulson was a radical, and encouraged his union to support candidates in elections who were in favour of Parliamentary reform or represented the labour movement, he was opposed to any formal political involvement by trade unions. Coulson did pledge his union's support for the Reform League, and the repeal of the Master and Servant Act, and even served on the council of the International Workingmen's Association in 1865/6.

Coulson devoted much of his time to running his trade union. When the treasurer of the Shoreditch branch absconded with its funds, he organised a search for the individual, and once he was captured, Coulson placed adverts informing the public of the prison sentence he had received. The union frequently came into conflict with the Manchester Unity of Bricklayers, and in 1869 when that union went on strike, he even endorsed the formation of an OBS branch of strikebreakers in the city. This only intensified after Howell joined the Manchester union, but eventually Coulson prevailed, the membership of the OBS greatly exceeding that of the other union.

While Coulson boycotted early meetings of the Trades Union Congress (TUC), partly in protest at Howell's involvement, he recognised its growing importance and served as President of the TUC in 1881. He used his presidential address to denounce protectionism, Parliamentary involvement in trade matters, and wars resulting from British imperialism. This proved the high point of his career, and he became increasingly authoritarian, promoting policies with which his union executive disagreed. Under pressure, he resigned in 1891, and retired to Cambridge, dying two years later.

Trade union offices
Preceded by Henry Turff	Secretary of the Operative Bricklayers' Society; 1860–1891	Succeeded by John Batchelor
Preceded by Brown and Shipton	Auditor of the Trades Union Congress; 1875; With: James Fitzpatrick	Succeeded by John Inglis and H. R. King
Preceded by John Murphy	President of the Trades Union Congress; 1881	Succeeded by Robert Austin
