= Robert Danter =

Robert Skirrow Danter (1824 or 1825 –1893) was an early British trade unionist.

Danter worked as an engine smith. He came to prominence in the Amalgamated Society of Engineers (ASE), where he served as chairman of the executive in the 1860s. He became associated with the "Junta", an informal council of leading trade unionists, and was also elected as chairman of the London Trades Council.

Danter was sent by the ASE to investigate the Sheffield Outrages. In his spare time, along with William Allan and William Newton, he supported the Labour Representation League and lobbied Parliament for measures which he believed would support the trade union movement.

By 1868, Danter had been replaced as chair of the ASE by W. Robson. In 1872, he and Charles Temple were awarded a patent for "an improved union, joint or coupling for hose and other pipes".
