= Danter =

Danter is a surname. Notable people with the surname include:

- Robert Danter (1824 or 1825–1893), British trade unionist
- Tom Danter (1922–1980), Welsh rugby union and rugby league player

== See also ==
- Dante (name)
- Kanter
