= John Batchelor (trade unionist) =

British trade unionist (1842–1929)

John Batchelor (1842 – 15 February 1929) was a British trade unionist.

Batchelor worked as a bricklayer in Kensington. In 1868, he joined the Operative Bricklayers' Society, and soon afterwards, he was elected as secretary of his branch. He devoted a large amount of his time to the union, rising to become chairman of its executive then, in 1891, its full-time general secretary.

Batchelor also became increasingly associated with the trade union "Junta", counting Robert Applegarth, C. J. Drummond, George Howell, George Odger and George Shipton as close friends.

Trade union offices
| Preceded by Edwin Coulson | Secretary of the Operative Bricklayers' Society; 1891–1919 | Succeeded by George Hicks |
