= Land Tenure Reform Association =

British pressure group for land reform

The Land Tenure Reform Association (LTRA) was a British pressure group for land reform, founded by John Stuart Mill in 1868. The Association opposed primogeniture, and sought legal changes on entails. Its programme fell short of the nationalisation of land demanded by the contemporary Land and Labour League.

== Background ==
The context of the formation of the Association was the aftermath of the Reform Act 1867. While the franchise had been extended, the Reform League that had pushed for the extension then collapsed as a political force. In parallel, Mill and Edmond Beales set up the Association to promote further reform and change. Besides modifications to land law, they proposed also to encourage co-operative agriculture and smallholders.

== Political role ==
Following a launch of a programme by Mill in July 1870, and organisational work in which Thomas Hare and Jacob Bright were involved, the Association held its first public meeting in 1871. A key plank of the Association's programme was taxation of the unearned increment. Mill's advocacy of this measure presaged more radical proposals of the 1880s. His views influenced Arthur Arnold, president of the Free Land League in 1885.

In July 1870 The Economist argued that the LTRA's emphasis on freeing up trade in land in fact would work against the expansion of peasant proprietors, since the wealthy would pay high prices for land. Agricultural labour's interests were represented at meetings of the LTRA by Joseph Arch.

On Mill's death on 1873, the Association's effective role came to an end. Mill had handed over to Alfred Russel Wallace. It was in the early 1880s that Wallace's writings led to the formation of the Land Nationalisation Society. The Association itself closed down in 1876. Land reform was a more important issue at the 1885 general election than at any previous time, or subsequently.

== Membership ==
Besides Mill, the LTRA had other economists as members: John E. Cairnes, Cliffe Leslie and Thorold Rogers. English Members of Parliament (MPs) joined in numbers, but Irish MPs did not support the LTRA. Maxse described as "trusted Radicals and working class politicians" the group of supporters Edmond Beales, Charles Dilke, George Jacob Holyoake, Lloyd Jones, Benjamin Lucraft, Edward Miall, Walter Morrison, George Odger, Peter Alfred Taylor and John Weston.

The LTRA initially grew out of the Radical Club, and Dilke acted as its secretary in its early life. Henry Fawcett worked with Dilke and others in 1869 to set up an organisation, in response to Mill's call to action. Other members were Frederic Harrison, John Morley and Alfred Russel Wallace.

There were supporters in common of the First International (IWMA) and the LTRA, such as Joseph Lane the socialist and William Randal Cremer, as well as Lucraft and Odger. Mill's advocacy of taxing the "unearned increment" won the support of Robert Applegarth, an IWMA delegate. George Howell of the Trades Union Congress worked for the LTRA as a financial agent.
