= David Gardner (trade unionist) =

British trade unionist

David S. Gardner (died 1913) was a British trade unionist.

Born in Glasgow, Gardner was a member of the Amalgamated Society of Engineers (ASE). In 1893, he was elected to its new executive, representing Division 1 (Scotland and Carlisle), which required him to move to London. Gardner supported the Independent Labour Party (ILP), and argued unsuccessfully that the union should support G. N. Barnes as an ILP candidate in the 1894 Govan by-election. He was a leader of the opposition to general secretary John Anderson, arguing as early as 1893 that he should be removed from office for drunkenness. Anderson was eventually dismissed in 1896, and Barnes succeeded him.

Gardner, with Barnes, argued in 1900 that the union should affiliate to the new Labour Representation Committee, something supported by the membership but on very low turnouts. In 1903, Gardner was elected as chairman of the executive of the ASE.

Gardner supported building links with other unions, arguing that the union should join the Federation of Engineering and Shipbuilding Trades and the General Federation of Trade Unions (GFTU). It did affiliate to the GFTU, and in 1906, Gardner succeeded Barnes on its executive council, becoming treasurer in 1908.

In 1909, Barnes stood down as general secretary of the ASE, and Gardner stood for the post, losing to Jenkin Jones by 18,000 votes to 15,000. By this point, he was in declining health, leading him to leave his GFTU post and take time off from his ASE role, eventually resigning in 1910. He died three years later.

Trade union offices
Preceded by New position	Group 1 representative on the Executive Council of the Amalgamated Society of Engineers; 1893–1910	Succeeded by John Husband
Preceded by Alfred Golightly	Chairman of the Amalgamated Society of Engineers; 1903–1910	Succeeded by Albert Taylor
Preceded by Joseph Maddison	Treasurer of the General Federation of Trade Unions; 1908–1909	Succeeded by Thomas H. Wilkins
