= Robert Austin (trade unionist) =

British trade unionist

Robert Austin (1826 – September 1891) was a British trade unionist.

Born in Wigan, Austin joined the Journeymen Steam Engine and Machine Makers' Friendly Society in 1847. He soon moved to Bury and helped bring about the merger which formed the Amalgamated Society of Engineers (ASE) in 1851. In 1863, he was appointed as the Manchester Vacant Bookkeeper for the society, and became known for his honesty and devotion to duty in the post.

By 1882, Austin was the chairman of the Manchester and Salford Trades Council and, a role in which he was centrally involved in organising that year's Trades Union Congress (TUC). He was chosen unanimously as President of the TUC that year.

In 1886, Austin was elected general secretary of the ASE, defeating John Anderson by 856 votes, finishing with 9,956 to Anderson's 9,100. He took office the following year, and served in the post until his death in September 1891.

Trade union offices
Preceded by Edwin Coulson	President of the Trades Union Congress; 1882	Succeeded by Thomas Smith
Preceded by John Burnett	General Secretary of the Amalgamated Society of Engineers; 1886 – 1891	Succeeded by John Anderson
