= Robert Young (trade unionist) =

British trade unionist

Sir Robert Young OBE
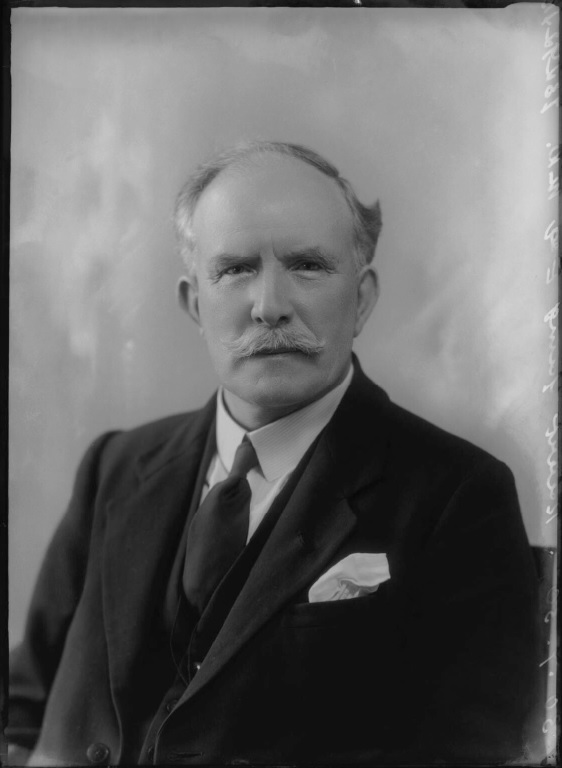
- Young in 1930 by Bassano

Deputy Speaker of the House of Commons Chairman of Ways and Means
- In office 3 July 1929 – 27 October 1931
- Monarch: George V
- Speaker: Edward FitzRoy
- Preceded by: James Hope
- Succeeded by: Dennis Herbert
- In office 12 February 1924 – 9 December 1924
- Monarch: George V
- Speaker: John Henry Whitley
- Preceded by: James Hope
- Succeeded by: James Hope

Member of Parliament for Newton
- In office 14 November 1935 – 3 February 1950
- Preceded by: Reginald Essenhigh
- Succeeded by: Frederick Lee
- In office 14 December 1918 – 7 October 1931
- Preceded by: Roundell Palmer
- Succeeded by: Reginald Essenhigh

Personal details
- Born: 26 January 1872 Glasgow, Scotland, UK
- Died: 13 July 1957 (aged 85)
- Party: Labour
- Education: Mossbank Industrial School
- Alma mater: Ruskin College, Oxford

Sir Robert Young (26 January 1872 – 13 July 1957) was a trade unionist and Labour Party politician in the United Kingdom.

== Early life and career ==
Young was born in Glasgow, and attended Mossbank Industrial School in the city before taking up a career in engineering. He subsequently became one of the first students enrolled at Ruskin College, Oxford. Following his graduation he delivered some of Ruskin's extramural lectures to union branches and co-operative societies. In 1910 he married Bessie Laurina Choldcroft, and they had three children.

In 1906 he became a member of the permanent staff of the Amalgamated Society of Engineers, becoming the union's assistant secretary in 1913 and its general secretary in 1919. He was awarded the OBE in 1917.

== Political career ==
At the 1918 general election, he was elected as Member of Parliament (MP) for Newton in Lancashire, which eventually led to his resignation from his union post. He was appointed Deputy Speaker of the House of Commons in the first Labour government of 1924. He was reappointed to the position by the second Labour government of 1929 - 1931.

He lost his seat at the 1931 general election to the Conservative Reginald Essenhigh, but regained it at the 1935 general election. For the next fifteen years he was to be a member of a number of parliamentary committees, and chaired the Select Committee on House of Commons Procedure and the Standing Committee for the Consideration of Bills.

Young was knighted in 1931, and retired from the House of Commons at the 1950 general election.

== Personal life ==
Among his interests outside parliament, he was chairman of the Workers Temperance League and independent chairman of the Ophthalmic Benefit Approved Societies.

Parliament of the United Kingdom
Preceded by Roundell Palmer	Member of Parliament for Newton; 1918–1931	Succeeded by Reginald Essenhigh
Preceded by Reginald Essenhigh	Member of Parliament for Newton; 1935–1950	Succeeded by Frederick Lee
Trade union offices
Preceded by Frederick Crompton and William Glennie	Assistant General Secretary of the Amalgamated Society of Engineers; 1908–1913; With: William Glennie	Succeeded by William Glennie and Albert Smethurst
Preceded by Jenkin Jones	General Secretary of the Amalgamated Society of Engineers; 1913–1919	Succeeded by Tom Mann
