= Alfred Sellicks =

British trade union leader (1845–1903)

Alfred Sellicks (22 September 1845 – 14 February 1903) was a British trade union leader.

Born in Andover, in Hampshire, Sellicks began working at the age of ten, later completing an apprenticeship as an agricultural engineer. He later relocated to London, where he joined the Amalgamated Society of Engineers (ASE), and was also prominent in the co-operative movement.

In 1874, Sellicks was elected to the executive of the ASE, and in 1893 when the union first had a permanent executive appointed, he was elected as its president. He also served on the Battersea Vestry for six years, as a Progressive Party representative, and was its first vice-chair. He was a supporter of John Burns. He supported John Anderson as general secretary until 1895, but the following year backed his removal from office for dereliction of duty.

Sellicks died, still in office, early in 1903.

Trade union offices
Preceded by New position	President of the Amalgamated Society of Engineers; 1893–1903	Succeeded by Alfred Golightly
