= Benjamin Lucraft =

English craftsman and radical (1809 – 1897)

Benjamin Lucraft (28 November 1809 – 25 September 1897) was a craftsman chair-carver in London where his radical inclinations led him to be involved in multiple political movements.

Lucraft was a public advocate of Chartism and a founder member, and sometime chairman, of the "General Council of First International" of the International Workingmen's Association. He was the only working-class man elected to the first London School Board in 1870 where he campaigned for free education for all, among other issues. He was a member, or officer, in a large number of radical political movements of the 19th century.

In 1874 he stood for election in Finsbury and in 1880 for Tower Hamlets; in both elections he was unsuccessful but was one of the forerunners of the Lib-Lab candidates who had their first electoral success in 1874. He died in 1897.

== Early life ==
Benjamin Lucraft's family had settled in Broadclyst, Devon, in 1781 when his grandfather William Lucraft married Esther Newton in the parish church on 10 December 1781. Esther was the daughter of William Newton and Esther Leight, both Broadclyst families and Esther's grave still stands in the churchyard after her death in 1831, aged 71. The family had moved from the South Hams area of Devon in the 17th century.

Lucraft was born on 28 November 1809, in Exeter, the second son of Lucraft and his wife Mary. His father Benjamin came from Broadclyst where he had been a wood worker and possibly a chair-carver. Lucraft was baptised at St. Paul church Exeter on 16 December 1809.

In 1819 around the age of 10 Lucraft was apprenticed in husbandry to his grandfather William according to his apprentice indenture. Some sources suggest that he was a ploughboy and was apprenticed in cabinet making at 14 years. The only story from this time is that he was later in life described as a boy reading the newspaper to his adult working colleagues on the farms where they worked.

=== Taunton to London ===
By 1830 Lucraft was living with his parents in Taunton in a house on North Street, and later on East Leech Street. Either his father or he himself worked as a cabinet maker at a workshop on the east side of High Street where he paid a rate of £7.10s 0d, qualifying for a vote. Lucraft and his family were cabinet makers and were also listed at High Street in 1830. While they were there the Poor relief gave his father 1s 1d in January 1830 and 1s 7d in February 1830 from the Poor Rate for buying stock.

Lucraft married Mary Pearce, whose family also lived on East Leech, in St. Mary Magdalene Parish Church, Taunton, on 24 December 1830. When Mary and Lucraft had their first child they named him George Seely (sic) Lucraft. He was baptised at St. Mary's on 3 November 1831.

Their second child died in 1832 and in January 1834 Lucraft, Mary and their son moved to Shoreditch in London, with Lucraft as a chair-carver, bringing with them his mother Mary who is recorded in the London census of 1841 as employing a man and a boy.

Lucraft lived with his mother at Mill Row, off Kingsland Road, as he raised his family and began to make a reputation as a draughtsman and carver.

In the 1850s Lucraft’s wife Mary died aged about 52. On 27 June 1858 Lucraft married again at the Register Office in the Strand. He married Mary Ann Adelaide Hitchin, spinster daughter of William and Mary Hitchin. She was living at 5 Lyons Inn and she said her father was a jeweller.

== Chairmaker ==
Lucraft became one of the most famous chair-carvers of his generation and stayed at this trade until well past retiring age, turning out chairs which were admired at multiple exhibitions.

His son, George Seely Lucraft, set up the company G S Lucraft and Co Ltd. on City Road in London and employed his father as a chair-carver. This arrangement gave Lucraft the freedom to follow his political career. George Seely Lucraft followed his father in the furniture trade and was also active in radical politics, among other things being the chairman of the committee to promote the Labour candidate for the London School Board in succession to his father in 1890. George later was active in Liberal-Labour politics, being the agent for a London borough.

The company designed and sold a range of furniture and supplied the well-known retailers such as Maples, Robert Gillow and Heals (department store). It was not the English custom to always sign work and so it is not possible to find many identifiable examples of his work.

On one occasion Queen Victoria attended an exhibition and admired one of his chairs, commenting to him in person about their excellence. There is one domestic chair known to have been made by him in the possession of a descendant.

A chair was made by Lucraft at the request of the Liberal Party (UK) when they wished to honour William Ewart Gladstone. It was presented to Gladstone by the liberals of the Borough of Greenwich and the Liberal Club of the neighbourhood on 17 August 1881. After some years research the chair was found again in a corner of the library at Hawarden Castle (18th century): the North Wales home of Gladstone. One of Lucraft's great great grandsons, Jack Edmonds Lucraft, arranged for it to be restored as it was in a bedraggled condition. The irony is that the cabinet-maker made a chair for the Prime Minister who gave working men the vote after a time when the cabinet-maker had himself been called in parliament a "cabinet-breaker".

== Temperance ==
Lucraft's obituary in the Hackney Gazette records him as a total abstainer from alcohol after 1846. Abstinence, Teetotalism or Temperance, was a religious and political movement in the 19th century as working men and women organised into support groups and movements to promote abstinence and to support each other after they had "taken the pledge".

George Howell, the political activist and commentator, remembered that he worked closely with Lucraft in temperance work in 1856 and 1857. The members of local temperance groups formed themselves into Circuits, along the lines of Methodism, and speakers travelled from one group to another speaking and promoting the issues.

Soon after becoming a teetotaler in 1846 Lucraft also signed the declaration of the London Temperance Charter Association. This declared that the signatories would not drink any intoxicating drinks until the People's Charter, the foundation tenets of Chartism, became the law of the land.

From the late 1840s to the late 1850s the Temperance Movement seems to have been one of Lucraft's main political activities and he is reported in 1858 as being the treasurer of the London Temperance Charter Association. He is also noted at a meeting he arranged of this group on Sunday 10 January in the Star Coffee House at 33 Polden Lane, Barbican, and he is noted as also arranging the meeting for the next week.

After his election to the London School Board in 1870 Lucraft was one of the working men selected to meet Lord Kimberley to express their support for the government's proposed legislation on the sale of alcohol which was then being debated.

The next flurry of reported temperance actions comes when Lucraft is standing for election to parliament for the constituency of Tower Hamlets in 1879. He and his agents, including Mr Dyer, are drumming up support for Lucraft, and the temperance movement is one network they lobby hard to gain votes. Much of the evidence for this is recorded in the National League Journal, which is the publication of Josephine Butler's movement for the repeal of the Contagious Diseases Acts.

In April 1879 he is reported as being the President of a "flourishing" branch of the Band of Hope Union in London. In one letter to the electors he says:

..with respect to the important question of temperance, and the licensing laws, I would support the placing of a legal power of restraining the issue or renewal of licences, in the hands of the inhabitants themselves, by some efficient measure of local option.

One report of his election platform in 1879 says that he stands "as a temperance, repeal, and working men's candidate." In March 1880 the Friends Association Report (the Quakers) reports that Lucraft was well supported among non-conformist and temperance voters.

Then towards the end of his life he was still active in the movement. In 1896 he was at a well-reported and famous meeting of Octogenarian Teetotallers in St Martin's Hall, London. There were over forty 80-year-olds present and around 200 had actually been traced with 152 providing questionnaire answers about their lifestyle.

A few months later in November 1896 Lucraft celebrated 50 years as a total abstainer, at a party where he was surrounded by his children, grandchildren and great grand children. This significant achievement in his life was reported in the Hackney Gazette.

At his funeral just under a year later in 1897 the minister reported that as well as from every other walk of his life, there were representatives of the temperance movement at his grave-side.

== Lucraft's report on the Paris Universal Exhibition ==
Lucraft's prowess with the chisel, and his campaigning for the improvement of the education of apprentices, led him to be asked by the Royal Society of Arts to attend the Paris Universal Exhibition Exposition Universelle (1878), and report on his findings in respect of the training of workers in the furniture trade.

He found matters far better arranged in France for the production of quality furniture and proposed wholesale changes to the apprentice system, a number of which were later adopted. He was anxious that draughtsmanship should be a part of the training, as he himself always drew out his own work, and felt men were disadvantaged in their skills if they could not do the whole piece as a craftsman. He proposed the idea of a school or college for the furniture trade apprentices and this idea eventually became the London School of Furniture, now part of London Metropolitan University. He proposed and worked towards the establishment of a museum in East London of craft work, skills and tools that would enable the working man to see how trades were worked in other times and places.

A copy of the report sits in the bookcase which was presented to him on his re-election to the London School Board in 1873. The inscription on the bookcase reads:

This bookcase and books were presented to Mr Benjamin Lucraft, the only workman member of the first School Board for London, on his re-election in 1873, by his Committee and Supporters, as a mark of their esteem, and in recognition of services rendered by him to the cause of popular education.

== Working men’s exhibitions ==
Lucraft worked with others to bring into being the working men's exhibitions he sought, perhaps as a counterbalance to the grandeur and exclusivity of the Great Exhibition which he had witnessed. The First Working Men's Exhibition in the Agricultural Hall was in 1865 and George Howell records that Benjamin was one of the promoters.

Benjamin was on the Management Committee for the first exhibition where he donated £10 and exhibited some furniture – perhaps a chair of his or some work from the company. At the second he was on the Council of the Exhibition which secured substantial contributions.

== Political life ==
Lucraft had taken an interest in political reform which would benefit the situation of the working classes. Through the middle years of the 19th century there were myriad organisations which campaigned across a whole range of issues. Lucraft was active in a large number of these organisations, often taking office in them and representing their interests, both in London and abroad.

During these years it is often possible from newspaper records to say where he was speaking at or chairing meetings on three, four or five evenings a month and probably more besides those reported in the press.

One document says Lucraft joined Attwood's Political Union in 1829, before he came to London.

Lucraft became the secretary and most prominent member of the North London Political Union, a Chartist group which met in Islington and which George Howell attended. He was a speaker on the circuit of the Wheatsheaf Yard Temperance Society organised, by Howell on the Wesleyan model, which lectured all over London. Dyer also records Lucraft's active membership, from 1850, of Richard Cobden's Parliamentary and Financial Reform Association.

In the spring of 1848 Feargus O'Connor decided on a new strategy that would combine several different tactics: a large public meeting, a procession and the presentation of a petition to the House of Commons. O'Connor organised the meeting to take place at Kennington Common on Monday, 10 April 1848. Lucraft was reported to have been at the great demonstration, which was the strongest meeting of supporters of the Chartist Movement.

Lucraft ended his life close to James Bronterre O'Brien, the leader of the Chartists, as they are both buried in Abney Park Cemetery north of Kingsland Road where Benjamin spent his working life.

George Howell wrote a handwritten note about Lucraft's life and activities which survived in the papers of the Bishopsgate Institute and is re-produced here:

"Mr Lucraft may be described as almost the last surviving link between the old Chartist movements prior to 1850, and the newer political movements which grew out of the Chartist agitation towards the end of the fifties and onward until the Reform Act of 1884. Lucraft was one of the earliest I heard speak after coming to London, Mr Ernest Jones being the first as already stated. Often and often have I stood by Lucraft in what was then known as the Copenhagen Fields, and also in a meeting place in Chapel Street Islington. I became more closely associated with Mr Lucraft in Temperance work in 1856 and 1857, from which dates we have been old friends and close associates. He was among the first members of the Reform League and was a member of the Council and the Executive from the first. He was never a very effective speaker, but he was able always to put his points forcibly, because he knew what he wanted and could see tolerably clearly the way in which it could be obtained. In his earlier days he was thought to be an implacable Chartist, and nothing else; but he was not the man to oppose reform because all that he desired was not granted. Lucraft was sternly devoted to "principles", but he acknowledged the value of compromise when it was a question of something or nothing. He was unswerving in his advocacy of chartism and teetotalism. From 1850 to 1860 he was one of the few that kept the lingering embers of the chartist movement alive, by blowing it, so that if it did not light up very much you could still see the sparks, and feel some of its warmth. Next to chartism pure and simple, that is "the six points", he was an ardent advocate of Land Law Reform and of Technical Education, and was one of the promoters of, and exhibitors at the first Workman's Exhibition in the Agricultural Hall in 186_. [sic]

After the dissolution of the Reform League in 1869, Lucraft became an ardent advocate of the Education policy of the National Education League, and was rewarded by being selected as one of the candidates for, and duly elected as one of the Members of the London School Board for the Division in which he had always lived – the old Borough of Finsbury. The excellence of his work on the School Board for London is now admitted by everybody. He especially left his mark in connection with the questions of Technical Education, and the use of London Charities. Although strongly in favour of a purely secular system of education, he was a staunch supporter of the compromise arrived at in the earlier history of the Board. Mr Lucraft always took an independent view, and would not become a mere party man in all occasions.

The other question was the substitution of Arbitration in lieu of war, a Peace Policy for all nations. He was one of the first members of the Workman's Peace Association, and was for some years its chairman. Lucraft was a true and loyal colleague, in council and out of it. He would never condescend to be in cliques, though his good nature sometimes was used for such purposes. But as soon as he saw the drift he manfully resumed his independent attitude. His regularity and punctuality were proverbial. Lucraft was at his post. In the open air, at meetings, or in the Committee Room, he was on duty. I think he loved speaking for its own sake, and yet he could sit quietly and record his vote if silence was thought to be best. But "in the Park", or in Trafalgar Square, or on his own more familiar ground – Clerkenwell Green – Lucraft was always to the front, and I must add was always welcome. Lucraft was much respected for his high character in the Borough in which he lived, which was testified again and again by his repeated re-elections to the School Board for London."

== Political Reform League ==
The last Chartist conference opened in London on Monday 8 February 1858, and Lucraft shared the chair with Alderman Thomas Livesey of Rochdale. The outcome was the formation of the Political Reform League (or Union) with a programme of:

- manhood suffrage
- the ballot
- triennial parliaments
- equal electoral districts
- abolish property qualifications

The league was active throughout 1859 and its work encouraged the establishment of Manhood Suffrage Associations throughout the country, of which the North London Union was one.

Lucraft came to prominence in London working-class politics with former Chartists like himself – Robert Hartwell and J.B. Leno among them – he was an important bridge figure between the radical movements of the Chartist period and the Reform League of the eighteen sixties. One political commentator says that "as much as anyone in these early years of the revival of the political reform movement, Benjamin helped to impress upon the craft unions the recognition of the desirability of political initiatives and change".

His attitude was summarised in a letter he wrote to Reynold's Newspaper on 28 July 1861 about a prolonged strike of builders:

"I should hope that the operative builders are by this time convinced that political power has something to do with the social conditions of the people."

Lucraft joined the Land and Labour League as the most advanced radical organisation in England and served on the Council. He was a founder member of John Stuart Mill's Land Tenure Reform Association, urging the state control of land and served on the General Council of the Association.

== The International Working Men's Association ==
Lucraft was at the inaugural meeting of what became the First International, the International Workingmen's Association, described by Karl Marx in a famous letter to Friedrich Engels dated 4 November 1864. The founding meeting took place on 28 September in St. Martin's Hall. It had been convened by George Odger and William Randal Cremer, and the meeting was chaired by Edward Spencer Beesly. Lucraft was elected to the provisional committee.

Lucraft was a member of the General Council of the IWMA from its foundation in 1864 to 1871 and he played an active and committed part in its political work. He was a signatory to the 'Address to the People of America' on 29 November 1864 congratulating them on Abraham Lincoln's re-election to the presidency. He proposed a resolution on 10 January 1865 pledging continued support to the Polish people in the struggle against Tsarism, was a delegate to the Brussels Congress of 1868 and the Basle Congress of 1869.

Marx drafted most of the important documents and statements from the International. His career to that point, as an author and journalist, made him a natural in this service. The only other "intellectual" worker on the General Council (known early on as the Central Council) was Peter Fox (another journalist). The other members were:

- Tailor–Johann Eccarius, Lessner, Maurice, Milner, Stainsby
- Carpenter–Applegarth, Cremer, Lochner, Weston
- Weaver—Bradnick, J. Hales, Mottershead
- Shoemaker—Morgan, George Odger, Serraillier
- Furniture Maker—Dell, Lucraft
- Watchmaker—Jung
- Mason—Howell
- Musical-instrument maker Dupont
- Hairdresser—Lassassie

The minutes of the meetings show Lucraft as often chairing the First International and at one such meeting in 1869 a letter of the IWMA was approved to be sent to the National Labour Union of the United States. Lucraft preferred Marx's use of the word "vermin" to describe those who profited from the American Civil War.

In September 1866 Lucraft was a representative of the London Trades Council at the First Conference of the International in Geneva.

== Parliamentary reform ==
The reform of voting rights for parliamentary elections had long been an issue. An act of Parliament in 1809 made the purchase of votes illegal and was one of a series of acts of Parliament which dealt with minor abuses of the electoral process during the first part of the 19th century.

The Reform Act 1832 had made some steps to change the way Parliament was elected with the old system of rotten boroughs with just a handful of voters, literally less than 10 people in some cases, was swept away.

The underlying problem of the representation of the people, by which was meant a wider franchise than just the county set or the propertied land-owners, was not addressed. By the 1860s Lucraft was active as a representative of the Furniture Workers and as such sat on the General Council of the International Working Men's Association, The First International.

The years in which Lucraft was involved in the agitation for the extension of the franchise into the later sixties was the most influential period of his career. At this stage he ranked as an ultra-radical in terms of British politics. He understood the crucial importance of the craft unions in any viable working-class political movement and accepted a need for militant action to achieve defined aims and goals.

After Garibaldi's visit to London the English members of the General Council, including Lucraft, had taken a prominent part in the founding of the Reform League in 1865 which led to the agitation culminating in the Reform Act 1867. Lucraft was a member of the Council and the Executive of the Reform League.

The Trades Unions had been unenthusiastic about political, as opposed to industrial, reform and after the failure of the mildly reformist Liberal bill of 1866 the Reform League was in danger of going under. Lucraft was the key figure in deliberately soliciting the participation of the Trades Unions and in breaking down their reservations, paving the way for the demonstrations of 1866–1867.

The modest programme that Edward Beales and George Howell, leaders of the League, were promoting began to be challenged by Lucraft in April 1866 when he started weekly outdoor meetings on Monday nights on Clerkenwell Green – thereby reached out to working-class groups hitherto unresponsive to more traditional political agitation. They had a wagon for a platform, a band to lead the singing, and a banner for the men from Clerkenwell. Once Lucraft had taken the initiative the executive felt obliged to vote to subsidise the Clerkenwell Green events.

William Ewart Gladstone's inability to carry through even a minimal reform and the reactionary and insulting speeches of the anti-reformers all combined to lead the Reform League down a more militant path. The first manifestation of the new temperament among the League membership came, not unexpectedly, from Lucraft. His response to the defeat of the Liberal bill was to escalate his open air demonstrations by moving them from Clerkenwell Green to Trafalgar Square.

Early in 1867 the militant elements in the leadership of the Reform League again decided that more vigorous action was required, this time against the Derby-Disraeli ministry, and weekly demonstrations began in Trafalgar Square. Charles Bradlaugh and Lucraft were among those pushing for escalation and Lucraft was one of five proponents appointed to organise a rally in Hyde Park on 6 May.

This was first banned by the Home Secretary Spencer Walpole and then, because of the large numbers that gathered round the ten platforms, allowed to proceed in spite of thousands of police and troops.

On the evening of 27 June 1866 he led a thousand demonstrators to the West End where an estimated 10,000 had already assembled. Unwilling to allow Lucraft to outface them the Executive decided to hold its own Trafalgar Square meeting on 2 July and Howell was appointed to supervise the arrangements. This was the League's first real popular success, with estimates up to 80,000 for the attendance, and it was further decided to hold a rally in Hyde Park on 23 July.

The authorities became frightened by the spectre of revolution and Sir Richard Mayne, Metropolitan Police Commissioner, banned the meeting although a majority of the Executive resolved to ignore the prohibition.

Unlike July 1866 the League showed its capacity for organising a working-class agitation in defiance of parliamentary authority while keeping good order despite some small local violence. The workers forced their way through the police cordons, past flailing truncheons, to a noisy rally where a short section of the park railings were pushed over.

The League regarded the sixth of May as a 'great moral triumph'. The Home Secretary resigned, on what were said to be health grounds, and the Prime Minister admitted that the government had 'subjected themselves to some slight humiliation in the public mind'.

While Benjamin Disraeli denied he was yielding to pressure he accepted the lodger franchise proposals, removed the distinction between personal and compound ratepayers, allowed it to be a household suffrage measure and stripped most of the guarantees which the Conservatives had been promised.

== Fenianism ==
Lucraft took an active part in the debates on the much more sensitive issue of Fenianism during the latter part of 1867 within the Council of the Reform League. Beales, the President, had written a letter approving the aims of the Fenians, but condemning their tactics, and for this he was strongly attacked by those members of the League's Council who were also members of the General Council of the IWMA: notably Lucraft, Odger and Weston.

Lucraft argued that the Irish "were fully justified in using physical force to redress their wrongs" and he tried to prevent the letter being published. The British Press vigorously condemned the Reform League in general and Lucraft and Odger in particular.

== Basle Congress 1869 ==
At the Basle Congress of the First International in 1869 Lucraft not only advocated land nationalisation (along with Robert Applegarth) but he further argued for the large-scale cultivation of the land by the state on behalf of the people, as against peasant proprietorship.

He explained that as he had travelled by train through France he saw the fragmentation of the land into tiny plots that had followed the French Revolution; a fragmentation which made profitability for the people so difficult. He recommended that land should be owned by the state on behalf of the people so that the French problems with fragmentation should not be repeated in England. Rather, large farms operated by the state with the full consent and labour of the people should be developed. The proposals sound uncannily like the later soviet collectives and would surely have suffered the same consequences had they been implemented.

These opinions, when reported in the British press, were described as "scandalous".

== Resignation from the IWMA ==
In 1871 Lucraft resigned from the IWMA after vacillating on the question of the Paris Commune. It was a radical touchstone and the IWMA press reports led to a pressure on its members. After a dispute about his signature being on the document written by Marx for the Council 'The Civil War in France', when it was clear he had had the chance to remove it if he chose to do so, Lucraft resigned admitting he had formed his views on the article from the press reports. After his resignation, with Odger, Lucraft made no more publicly recorded references to his association with the IWMA, or the part he had played in its history.

== Education for all ==
After the passing of the Reform Act 1867 the Chancellor of the Exchequer, Robert Lowe, remarked that the government would now "have to educate our masters". As a result of this view the government passed the Elementary Education Act 1870. The act was drafted by William Edward Forster and stated:

- The country would be divided into about 2,500 school districts.
- School Boards were to be elected by ratepayers in each district.
- The School Boards were to examine the provision of elementary education in their district, provided then by Voluntary Societies, and if there were not enough school places they could build and maintain schools out of the rates.
- The school Boards could make their own by-laws which would allow them to charge fees or, if they wanted, to let children in free.

Boards provided an education for the five to ten age group. In some areas school boards pioneered new educational ideas. For example the London School Board introduced separate classrooms for each age group, a central hall for whole-school activities and specialist rooms for practical activities. In Bradford Fred Jowett and Margaret McMillan pioneered the idea of free school meals for working-class children and, in Brighton, Catherine Ricketts developed the idea of increasing attendance rates by hiring women to visit mothers in their homes to explain the benefits of education.

The Elementary Education Act 1870 allowed women to vote for the school boards and women were also granted the right to be candidates to serve on the school boards. Several feminists saw this as an opportunity to show they were capable of public administration. In 1870 four women, Flora Stevenson, Lydia Becker, Emily Davies and Elizabeth Garrett Anderson were elected to local School Boards. Elizabeth Garrett, a popular local doctor, obtained more votes in Marylebone than any other candidate in the country.

On 1 December 1870 Lucraft was the only one of nine working men's candidates to be elected to the London School Board and he continued to be elected every three years until he retired in 1890, at which date he was the longest serving member. London Democrats held a celebration for Lucraft's election on 2 January 1871 at the Hole in the Wall in Hatton Garden with "feasting, speech-making, and other joyous observances".

Lucraft was never an outstanding figure on the board, but he pursued useful aims of a moderately radical kind. He opposed the office of paid chairman, opposed the use of the cane, always argued for free education, was vigorous against military drill in Board schools and was chairman of the committee which investigated and reported on the historical misappropriation of charitable funds and establishments – originally intended for the education of the children of the poor, but which had been taken over for the children of the wealthy. Dulwich College was one of a number of examples Lucraft quoted when the "City Parochial Charities" report came out in 1879. He was early in demanding compulsory education for all and the removal of all fees.

== Peace and other issues ==
In 1872 Lucraft was part of a deputation of working men to Lord Kimberley on 1 June, in favour of the Government Licensing Bill. In 1873 his grateful constituents presented Ben with a bookcase and 105 books of relevant titles, in appreciation for his work on behalf of the 'working man'. In 1874 Lucraft was added to the Council of the Working Men's Club and Institute Union as a sixth working man's representative.

The Peace Congress was held in Paris in September 1878, peace between France and Germany being the issue, with the political involvement of Russia and England on the agenda. Lucraft represented the Workmen's Peace Association in Paris of which he was one of the first members, and for nine years its chairman. He went to other foreign conferences on their behalf.

== Contagious diseases ==
More unorthodox was Lucraft's support, from 1877 onwards, for the Working Men's National League for the Repeal of the Contagious Diseases Acts. He spoke nearly every week for four years and became one of the honorary secretaries of the organisation, working closely with Josephine Butler. He went with her and others to Liege in 1879 and they brought pressure on the Liberal Party to include Repeal of the Contagious diseases Acts in the Liberal manifesto.

He described the Contagious Diseases Acts as 'the very worst class of party legislation' saying to working men who mostly were too embarrassed to discuss sexually transmitted diseases that "It is YOUR sisters, YOUR daughters that these acts are to entrap – to make use of. Not only for the army, not only for the common soldiers, but for the 'officers and gentlemen'".

== Standing for Parliament ==
Lucraft was asked by activists to stand again for Parliament in 1880, this time in Tower Hamlets, whereas in 1874 he had stood in Finsbury. He failed on both occasions though his position and candidature put him amongst the first Liberal-Labour and pre-Labour men.

== Death ==
Lucraft died at his home at 18 Green Lanes at Newington Green on 25 September 1897 leaving an estate of £334.

The funeral took place in Abney Park Cemetery and was conducted by Rev J. Ellis of Barnsbury Chapel who gave a full address of the life and achievements of a man who "while working for the generations through which he lived had brought benefits that future generations would enjoy." There were a large number of relatives, friends and former colleagues present – including a representative from Broadclyst in Devon. Natural flowers were placed on the coffin and Mr Ellis quoted the "Psalm of Life" by Henry Wadsworth Longfellow:

The lives of all great men remind us, We should make our lives sublime, And departing leave behind us, Footprints on the sands of time.
