= Ramsay Weston Phipps =

Irish Military historian, officer

- Born: 10 April 1838; Oaklands, Clonmel, County Tipperary, Ireland
- Died: 24 June 1923 (aged 84); Carlyle Square, Chelsea, London, England
- Education: Royal Military Academy at Woolwich
- Occupations: Army officer, military historian
- Known for: The Armies of the First French Republic and the Rise of the Marshals of Napoleon I (1926–1939)
- Title: Colonel
- Spouse: Anne Bampfylde
- Children: Edmund Ramsay July–August, 1867 Mary 9 February 1869; Edmund 1869–1947; Charles Foskett 1872–1930; Henry Ramsey 1874–1949 Gertrude Annie 1876–1934
- Parent(s): Pownoll Phipps; Ann Charlotte Smith
- Relatives: Earl of Mulgrave

Ramsay Weston Phipps (10 April 1838 – 24 June 1923) was an Irish-born military historian and officer in Queen Victoria's Royal Artillery. The son of Pownoll Phipps, an officer of the British East India Company's army, he was descended from the early settlers of the West Indies; many generations had served in the British, and the English military. Phipps served in the Crimean War, had a stint of duty at Malta, and helped to repress the Fenian uprising in Canada in 1866.

Phipps is known for his study of The Armies of the First French Republic and the Rise of the Marshals of Napoleon I, a five-volume set published posthumously from 1926–1939 by Oxford University Press. He also edited L.A. Fauvelet de Bourrienne's Memoirs of Napoleon Bonaparte, a three-volume work published in 1885 and Madame Campan's The private life of Marie Antoinette, queen of France and Navarre; with sketches and anecdotes of the courts of Louis XVI, published in 1889.

== Background ==
Ramsay Weston Phipps descended from generations of military and political men. Colonel William Phipps, a Yeoman of Lincolnshire, raised a regiment of horse for Charles I. Another of his ancestors was Lord Chancellor of Ireland in the reign of Queen Anne. Captain James Phipps settled the Island of St. Christopher, in the West Indies in 1676. The family was rewarded for its loyalty with titles and lands in Ireland. Ramsay Phipps was also a cousin of the Earls of Mulgrave.

In 1791, Phipps' grandfather, Constantine (1746–1797), rented the Hotel d'Harcourt in Caen, France, from the Duke of Harcourt; in 1793, he returned briefly to England in 1793 for the wedding of one of his daughters, leaving eight of his children in France. When War of the First Coalition broke out in 1793, the children were separated from their parents. Ramsay Phipps' father, Pownoll Phipps (1780–1858) and his siblings grew up in the French city during the French revolution, and lived under the threat of anti-English violence. Only after the Treaty of Campo Formio could the children return to England, arriving on 2 October 1798, all of them fluent in French; Pownoll Phipps reportedly spoke with French-accented English for the rest of his life. By the end of October, Pownoll had a commission as a lieutenant and joined the Bengal Army of the East India Company. The following June, he embarked for India on the Bombay-built ship Britannica.

Upon arrival in India, Pownoll Phipps joined the force under command of Colonel Arthur Wellesley. He participated in Sir David Baird's expedition from India to Egypt in 1801, for which participation he eventually became a Knight of the Crescent. Phipps married Henrietta Beaunpaire; orphaned by the French Revolution, she had taken refuge with him and his siblings at the Hotel d'Harcourt, on 10 August 1802, in Calcutta. Pownoll Phipps' second wife, Sophia Matilda Arnold, was Benedict Arnold's daughter. Phipps retired from the East India Company service on 1 July 1825, with the rank of colonel. Living for a time in London, he was a popular regular at Exeter Hall events. A well-versed, informed and articulate speaker and storyteller, Phipps was a gallant gentleman, readily at ease in all society, and very friendly: "a tall, stout, officer-like person, about 60-years of age, with white hair, short, sharp features, and a pleasant cast of countenance." He also had a strict sense of honor. In 1857, a year before his death, he wrote a letter to the Editor of The Times, in which he asserted his belief in the good character and quality of the Sepoys, despite the popular outrage against them during the Indian Mutiny. Pownoll Phipps developed bronchitis after presiding over the closing of an art exhibit in Clonmel, Ireland; he died in November 1858. His funeral was attended by Protestant and Catholics, and the procession was over a mile long.

Ramsay Weston Phipps was the second son of Pownoll Phipps and his third wife, the Irish-born Anna Charlotte Smith. Born at the family estate, Oaklands, in County Tipperary, Ireland, he was named Ramsay in honor of an uncle who pioneered slave emancipation in the West Indies, and Weston after another uncle, a scientific clergyman. By 1841, his father had returned to England, to reside in Kent, where the family lived in Yalding. They lodged at the "Parsonage" with a local farmer, Ramsey Warde; Ramsey Warde was also a relative of Phipps' mother. The family of four included three-year-old Ramsay, his older brother, Pownoll (age five), (Note: Married Elizabeth Dampier Risley, daughter of Shuckburgh Risley, 26 Jul 1859, Camden, Middlesex, St Pancras Parish Church. See London Metropolitan Archives, Saint Pancras Parish Church, Register of marriages, P90/PAN1, Item 123.) his mother (age 30) and his father. Eventually, two more children joined the family: Henrietta Sophia and Robert Constantine, twins born 23 September 1841. The boy died 9 October, but Henrietta lived into adulthood, marrying Lieutenant-Colonel William Smith. After suffering a bout of measles in spring 1847, Ramsay Phipps attended Mr. Barron's School at Stanmore with his older brother, Pownoll, with the intent to following his brother in a year or two to Rugby in Warwickshire.

== Military career ==
Before he could enter Rugby, Phipps was offered instead a cadetship and entered the government preparatory school at Carshalton in Surrey. In 1849, at the age of 11, he put on a uniform, and he wore it, or a variation of it, until his retirement in 1887. Phipps later attended the Royal Military Academy at Woolwich. After his graduation, he expected a commission in the Royal Artillery, and while awaiting it, he lived for a few months with his uncle at Carragh, Ireland; his lieutenant's commission arrived, dated 1 August 1855, and with it instructions him to join his Royal Artillery unit at Woolwich, for service in the Crimean War. He reached the Crimea in November 1855, and participated in the siege of Sevastopol. Assigned to the Matthew Dixon's 5th Company, 9th Battalion, he was part of the right siege train, and his chief occupation was blowing up the Sevastapol docks. He was still small for his age, and looked very young, which drew teasing from his company. The siege work was difficult and the living conditions were brutal; he recounted to his brother that the soldiers were plagued not only by the Russian fire, but by dysentery, bad food, and wintering in tents. He returned to England the following year on the Imperatrice, arriving in March 1856. Although he was given a medal to wear when Queen Victoria reviewed the troops, it was later collected from him; the decision was made at higher commands that only those who had landed in the Crimea prior to September 1855 would be awarded the Crimea Medal.

After his return to England, Ramsay Phipps was quartered at the Tower of London. After this assignment, he was sent to Plymouth, serving at the Prince of Wales Redoubt. In 1861, Phipps was stationed in South Shoebury, Essex. He was promoted to the Royal Artillery's unique rank of second captain on 7 April 1864, and appointed brigade adjutant on 14 October 1868. The brigade adjutant functioned as the staff officer for the brigade commander: he supervised all brigade books and records, monitored the execution of orders, supervised the education and training of subalterns, prosecuted in all courts-martial proceedings, and accepted and transmitted all orders.

Promotions

- Lieutenant: 1855
- Second Captain: 1863
- Major: 1873
- Brevet Lieutenant-Colonel: 1881
- Lieutenant-Colonel: 1883
- Colonel: 1886

Ramsay Phipps married Anne Bampfylde, the daughter of a Bath physician, in September 1864. With a few exceptions, most of Phipps' posts included garrison duty in southern England in the vicinity of the Royal Artillery barracks at Woolwich. Phipps traveled to the United States, arriving in Boston on 30 April 1866; he went to Canada to participate in operations against the Fenian uprising. In 1869, his brother and a friend sought to climb the Zermatt and the Schreckhorn, during which climb the friend fell over 1,000 feet (300 m) to bottom of the Lauteraar glacier. In the emergency, Ramsay Phipps joined his brother in Grindelwald while guides recovered the body.

In 1881, Phipps was stationed in Ireland; his wife remained in Bath, living in the prestigious Royal Crescent (No. 19), with her three children, a female cousin, and several servants. Phipps was promoted to major on 12 April 1873, to brevet lieutenant-colonel on 1 July 1881, and substantive lieutenant-colonel on 26 April 1882.

Phipps had little tolerance for foolishness and retained a professional soldier's dislike of civilian interference in military affairs, and ineffective administration, whether from civilians or government. In 1887, shortly after his retirement, he wrote a letter to the editor of The Times addressing some of the highly publicized problems of desertions from the ranks. "War Office civilians", he wrote, "like the plan of indiscriminate enlist, as it swells their list of recruits. Then, when the list of deserters grows, they put on long faces, and say, 'it must be those wicked officers.' The officers would stop this plan in a day if they were allowed." The problem with recruiters, Phipps maintained, lay in the need for quantity, not quality. "What fools you civilians are to pay for these blackguards", he wrote. "If you would let the officers select their men, for the first year or so, you would have fewer men on paper, fewer men in prison, and just as many men for service....I will then give you another hint for saving money...why not do away with the Inspector-General of Recruiting, and spend his pay in horse artillery, who would be very ornamental and very serviceable? What use is the Inspector General?" He had retired from active service in 1883, and Phipps fully retired in 1887, after attaining the rank of colonel.

Phipps and his wife had seven children, five of whom survived into adulthood. The first son, Edmund, born 1867, died less than two months later while the family was stationed at Plymouth. During a short stint on Malta in 1869, a daughter Mary was born and died immediately. Edmund Bampfylde was born in 1869, and followed a career in education; he attended New College, Oxford, and became a Deputy Secretary on the Board of Education. In 1906, he married Margaret Percy Phipps, who was Mayor of Chelsea for two terms. In 1916, he was appointed Companion of the Order of the Bath, followed by a knighthood in 1917; he served in the Ministry of Munitions during the latter part of World War I. Charles Fossett, born in 1872, and Henry, the youngest son, pursued military careers. Charles and Henry were awarded the Distinguished Service Order for their roles in the British Expeditionary Force in 1914. Charles attained the rank of lieutenant-colonel in the Royal Garrison Artillery during World War I, assigned to the VI Corps Heavy Artillery, and in 1918 moved to Parkgate, in Dublin. Henry married Lorna Campbell in 1906, and they had three children. Henry eventually attained the rank of lieutenant-colonel in the Royal Artillery, and died on 24 August 1949. The youngest, Gertrude Annie, was born on 13 December 1876. She married in 1907 to Lieutenant Colonel E.C. Sandars, CMG, also a Royal Artillery officer; the couple had a daughter, Elizabeth.

Phipps' wife died in October 1885. In 1888, Phipps settled with his three youngest children at Chalfont St Giles. The 1891 Buckingham census shows Phipps on the Royal Artillery retired list and living at a country manor house, The Stone, with his sons, 21-year-old Edmund, a student at the University of Oxford, and 16-year-old Henry, a student at Wellington, and 14-year-old Gertrude. Four servants supported this small family, including a cook, a lady's maid for Gertrude, a housemaid, and a scullery maid. In 1901, Henry had left the family household, but Edmund and Gertrude still lived with their father in St. Giles. Phipps remained at The Stone until 1920.

== Career as military historian ==
Chalfont St Giles lies 25 miles (40 km) from London, and about the same distance to Oxford, maintained a foot in the social world of London and the academic world of Oxford. Phipps was chairman of the magistrates for the Burnham division, sitting at Beaconsfield, and was a member of the County Standing Joint Committee and the County Licensing Committee. He also attended annual Diocesan Conferences at Oxford.

Phipps pursued his life-long interest in the Napoleonic Wars. In 1885, he edited a revised edition of what was then the standard authority on Napoleon, Louis Antoine Fauvelet de Bourrienne's Memoirs of Napoleon Bonaparte. He also wrote the revision's chapters XXIV and XXVI. Subsequently, he edited a new edition of the surgeon Barry Edward O'Meara's Napoleon at Saint Helena, another Napoleonic Wars classic, to which he wrote a new introduction: O'Meara had been Napoleon's doctor on Helena. Historians praised Phipps' introduction as a convincing exposition against the treatment of Napoleon on Helena. In 1889, he edited a revised edition of Jeanne-Louise-Henriette Campan's The private life of Marie Antoinette, queen of France and Navarre; with sketches and anecdotes of the courts of Louis XVI, which was also well received.

=== Creation of the magnum opus ===
Initially interested in the ministers of the Empire, Phipps was diverted to a deeper interest in Napoleon's marshals, primarily by the difficulty of obtaining facts about them. He capitalized on the growing interest of both Britons and the French in the Napoleonic period by purchasing, as they came out, the many personal memoirs published by the descendants of the participants. Indeed, by 1920, he had acquired over 2,000 volumes, plus sundry maps and letters. That year, in failing health, he moved to the house of his son, Charles, in Carlyle Square (21), Chelsea, London. There was no room for the books at his son's house, so Phipps gave them to All Souls College, Oxford; the majority of them were placed in the Codrington Library. He selected All Souls for its established reputation in military history, and for the Codrington's collection left to it by Sir Foster Cunliffe, who had been killed in action in 1916. The collection, called the Phipps Collection, numbered more than 2,000 volumes, and includes Napoleon's published correspondence, that of the marshals, and has been kept up to date with modern works issued by the Historical Department of the French General Staff.

By the 1920s, there was still little published in English about the French marshals. Phipps's work was complicated by the regular appearance of new material. The French field armies of the Revolutionary Wars (1793–1800) formed the military education of the future marshals, but little had been published in either French or English about their early military experience. Phipps called these revolutionary armies the Schools for Marshals. Furthermore, he postulated, "the Consulate and the Empire cannot be judged until the Revolutionary period has been studied in detail."

Published works were inconsistent, and French sources frequently misinterpreted the English sources, and vice versa. Phipps wrote both an introduction to his work and a summary of the histories of the armies of the Republic and the Consulate, from 1791 to 1804, and at certain points in his narrative, he paused to review the positions of the various future marshals and other well-known generals. He reflected on the development of their experience, the characteristics of their leadership, and the relationships to one another and to Napoleon. Critically, he posited that generals rarely improved with practice.

A massive typescript remained unfinished on Phipps's death in June 1923. It included an introduction, a summary of the armies, a detailed history of the armies and the coup d'état in Paris, a complete history of the French armies in Spain 1808–1814, accounts of Napoleon's 1814 campaign and of the marshals during the First and Second Restorations. It also included biographical material on the marshals and notes on the ministers of the Empire. Phipps hoped that his children might be able to prepare it all for publication, and he made some provision for that. After Phipps's death, with the support of Charles Oman, his son Charles F. Phipps supervised the publication of the first three volumes. Charles died in June 1932 before proofing the final galleys of volume three. Volumes four and five were left in the hands of Phipps's "very capable granddaughter" and literary executor, Elizabeth Sandars.

=== Reception ===
Phipps' effort, and that of his literary executors, was well received as both interesting and informative. "The narrative is that of a gallant gentleman whose life was spent as a 'soldier of the Queen' and in contributing to the greatness of the British Empire, who narrates to his listeners the facts which he has gathered, after his retirement from the army, in the pursuit of his favorite hobby." The narrative itself is informal and charming, not only full of analysis, but also relaying interesting stories and anecdotes about the marshals themselves. Other reviewers found the narrative clear, but undistinguished and "fatigued."

In the first volume, Phipps' analysis covers a categorization of the marshals, although the narrative itself is largely confined to the Armée du Nord. In the beginning, he points out, the French army was well disciplined and the class of non-commissioned officers was "especially good." As the integration of the so-called volunteers—the revolutionary conscripts—into the units of regular troops undermined morale, discipline, and conditions, the army's cohesion fell apart. Phipps highlighted in particular the problems of armies moving without magazines or supplies. His analysis of the classes of marshals—citizen, soldier, officer—offers a noteworthy and solid refutation of the marshals as a class of leadership rising from the rough soldiery; his criticism of the French Revolutionary army system resulting from the two amalgamations is acute, targeted and well-documented. However, by limiting his sources to only those in English or French, in which he also was fluent, Phipps necessarily restricted his details, ignoring the actions of the Austrians and the Russians. The evidence, though, is always well assembled, even though, by volume three, it becomes much more sparse.

Of the five volumes, the second may be the most interesting: it dealt with more interesting times, and more consistent military operations. The army of the north was a "bad army", and the story of its command is one of "honest and brave men hurried in turn to the guillotine, or of less honest men going over to the enemy." Some of Phipps' own eccentricities also appear in volume two; he frequently lapses into sarcasm, revealing his disdain for civilian administration of military affairs, and there are points at which he fails to follow through fully on his criticism; for example, he holds back on his critique of Jean Victor Moreau despite his assertion that he wanted to demolish once and for all the myth that Moreau was as great a soldier as Napoleon. Phipps adeptly describes the game of cat and mouse that Moreau, Jean Baptiste Jourdan, and the Archduke Charles played with one another in the summer of 1796 as their armies criss-crossed south-western Germany; neither general came to grips with the other until October, and even then, after the Battle of Schliengen, Charles was content to chase Moreau and Jourdan over the Rhine, not to demolish the French army. They were lacking, Phipps postulated, the instinct and nerves of Napoleon.

The problems associated with Phipps' lack of professional training as an historian become clear by the third volume. Despite his reading of newly published works, Phipps' idea of what constituted new material included the publications of memoirs and journals of the participants, not the extensive secondary literature and array of historiographical material in the periodic literature written by professional historians seeking to understand the French revolution and the Napoleonic Wars. (Note: In a 1905 letter, he refers to Revue des Deux Mondes of 15 July 1905, in which the Marquis Gicquel des Touches describes his grandfather's experience in the Battle of Trafalgar on the French 74-gun Intrépide. See R. Phipps, "The Tactics of Trafalgar." The Times. Friday 11 August 1905, p. 5, Issue 37783, col. 3. Accessed 15 June 2010.) Consequently, Phipps' perceptions of the French revolution remained rooted in the outdated theories of Archibald Alison, Adolphe Thiers, and others, while ignoring some of the new theories of Albert Sorel, François Victor Alphonse Aulard and Albert Mathiez. His military background emerged clearly in his hostility to the meddling of the French government in the affairs of soldiers.

Phipps wrote volume three as a non-professional historian. He analyzed a large amount of material about the 1796–1797 campaigns in Ireland and the Pyrenees. He translated and organized French sources for English readers. This volume serves as a resource for those studying the topic. Phipps also detailed the events surrounding the suppression of revolts in Lyon and Toulon. The Revolutionary government viewed these specific revolts as significant challenges. Phipps provided an analysis of these events from his perspective outside of academia.

Reviewers also gave credit to Elizabeth Sanders, Phipps' granddaughter and literary executor, for her skillful handling of the last two volumes. The purpose of the work becomes even more apparent and direct under her management and editing of the material. The role of the future marshals becomes more clear in the campaigns of 1797, and especially in the Italian campaign; her handling of the material kept it fully focused on the future marshals Massena, Augereau, Berthier, and Brune.

By the time of the publication of the final volume, Phipps' work had established for itself a place in the pantheon of Napoleonic literature. It "will always be regarded as a valuable source", well-known to students of the Napoleonic era, and the last volume, critics maintained, was "as interesting as its predecessors." Not only did Phipps achieve his goal of creating a record of the development of the marshals, but his volumes have become a useful history of the progress of the wars themselves, from 1792 to 1799. The true value of the first volume, and indeed the subsequent four, lies in its repeated use as a reference work.

== Publications ==
- Ramsay Weston Phipps. The Armies of the First French Republic and the Rise of the Marshals of Napoleon I, Oxford: Oxford University Press, 1926–39.

=== Edited works ===
- Jeanne-Louise-Henriette Campan, The private life of Marie Antoinette, queen of France and Navarre; with sketches and anecdotes of the courts of Louis XVI, Revised edition edited by R.W. Phipps, London, Bentley, 1889.
- Barry Edward O'Meara, Napoleon on Saint Helena. Revised edition edited by R.W. Phipps, 2 volumes, London: Bentley, 1888.
- Louis Antoine Fauvelet de Bourrienne, Memoirs of Napoleon Bonaparte, revised edition edited by R. W. Phipps, 3 volumes, London, Bentley, 1885.

== Archives ==
Three photograph albums and a photographic print by Ramsay Weston Phipps are held in the British Empire and Commonwealth Collection at Bristol Archives. The albums include photos from 1874–1927, from Phipps' time in India (including parts of the North East frontier which is now Pakistan), Egypt, Aden, Burma, South Africa, and Ceylon. There are also images from Shoeburyness, Plymouth, Chalfont St Giles, Charterhouse and Canterbury Cathedral, as well as family photographs from England and abroad. (Ref. 2005/047) (online catalogue).

== Sources ==
=== Notes and citations ===
Notes

Citations

=== Bibliography ===
- Anderson, Troyer S. "Review." The American Historical Review. Vol. 41, No. 4 (Jul., 1936), pp. 745–746.
- Census Returns of England and Wales, 1891: Buckingham, St. Giles Chalfont, district 2. Kew, Surrey, England: The National Archives of the UK (TNA): Public Record Office (PRO), 1891. Class: RG12; Piece: 1131; Folio 15; Page 4; GSU roll: 6096241. Found at Ancestry. Retrieved 15 June 2010.
- East India Company, Great Britain. India Office. East-India register and army list. London, W.H. Allen [n.d.].
- England & Wales, Birth Index, 1837–1915. General Register Office. England and Wales Civil Registration Indexes. London, England. Various volumes. Found at Ancestry. Retrieved 15 June 2010.
- England & Wales, Death Index: 1916–2005. General Register Office. England and Wales Civil Registration. Various volumes. Found at Ancestry. Retrieved 15 June 2010.
- England & Wales, Marriage Index: 1837–1915.General Register Office. England and Wales Civil Registration Indexes. London, England: General Register Office. Various volumes. Found at Ancestry. Retrieved 15 June 2010.
- Falls, Cyril. "Review." The English Historical Review. Vol. 45, No. 180 (Oct., 1930), pp. 656–657
- Falls, Cyril. "Review." The English Historical Review. Vol. 55, No. 218 (Apr., 1940), p. 345.
- Foster, Joseph. Alumni Oxonienses: The Members of the University of Oxford, 1715–1886 and Alumni Oxonienses: The Members of the University of Oxford, 1500–1714. Oxford: Parker and Co. 1888–1892. Retrieved at Ancestry. Accessed 15 June 2010.
- Hart, H. G. The New Army List...for 1873. London: John Murray, 1873.
- Hart, H. G. Hart's annual army list, special reserve list, and territorial force list. London: Murray, 1883.
- Hawthorne, Nathaniel. The English Notebooks: 1853–1856. United States: Ohio State University Press 1997.
- Huidekoper, Frederic L. "Review." American Historical Review. 34:1, October 1928, pp. 120–121.
- Irvine, Dallas D. "Review." The Journal of Modern History. Vol. 4, No. 3 (September, 1932), pp. 471–474.
- London Gazette. no. 21764, p. 3129, 17 August 1855; no. 23966, p. 1923, 11 April 1873; no. 23966, p. 1923; no. 25089, p. 1412; and 28 March 1882, no. 25115, p. 2641, 6 June 1882. Retrieved on 15 June 2010.
- Lossing, Benson John. "Descendants of Benedict Arnold." The American historical record. Philadelphia: Chase & Town, Publishers, 1872–1874, volume 3.
- New England Historic Genealogical Society Staff. The New England Register. Westminster, MD: Heritage, 2010.
- Nolan, Fred. A brief history of Chalfont St. Giles. Village website. Accessed 15 June 2010.
- One of the Protestant side. Random recollections of Exeter Hall, in 1834–1837. London: James Nisbet and Co., 1837.
- Page, William (editor). Parish of Chalfont St. Giles. A History of the County of Buckingham: Volume 3 (1925), pp. 184–193. Found at British History online. University of London & History of Parliament Trust. 2010. Retrieved 14 June 2010.
- Parish register transcripts from the Presidency of Bengal, 1713–1948. India. Office of the Registrar General. Salt Lake City, Utah: Filmed by the Genealogical Society of Utah, 1966–1967.
- Phipps, Pownoll William. The life of Colonel Pownoll Phipps. London: Bentley, 1894.
- Phipps, Ramsay Weston. The Armies of the First French Republic and the Rise of the Marshals of Napoleon I. Oxford: Oxford University Press, 1926–1939, volumes 1–5.
