= Giulio (short story) =

Short story by Napoleon Bonaparte

"Giulio" is a short story written by Emperor Napoleon Bonaparte in 1805. The story appears in print in Louis Antoine Fauvelet de Bourrienne's Memoirs of Napoleon Bonaparte.

In 1805, while serving in Hamburg as Minister Plenipotentiary of the French Empire, Bourrienne received a packet from Empress Josephine Bonaparte. The packet contained a print of a story written by Bonaparte, "Giulio."

== Plot ==
"Giulio" follows a two-year span of a young Roman male named Giulio. The story begins with Giulio and his friend Camillo visiting a beautiful and mysterious sybil who lives in an abandoned palace in the suburbs of Rome. The sybil has the ability to tell one's future and has driven many who have solicited her insight mad. Camillo is given relatively tame insight into his marriage with Giulio's sister, which had already been arranged prior to their visiting the sybil, while Giulio is given a harrowing insight into his future. The sybil proclaims to him: "Love without bounds! Sacrilege! Murder!" This causes immense distress to Giulio, who tries later to visit the sybil again to gain further clarity into her words, yet she had left the abandoned palace.

Giulio becomes very concerned after visiting the sybil and receiving her oracle: he cloisters himself from everyone except his tutor-monk. He misses his sister's wedding with Camillo. Eventually, after long discussions with his tutor-monk, Giulio flees from Rome to Messina in order to join a Dominican monastery of St. Thomas, whose Superior, Father Ambrosio, allows Giulio to pronounce his vows after one year of novitiate. Giulio had determined that joining a monastery would be the best way to possibly avoid his vague destiny of love without bounds, sacrilege, and murder given to him by the sybil. He believes joining the monastery would end his flesh being forever, thereby preventing his destiny from occurring.

Giulio is named preacher of the monastery by Father Ambrosio. One day, while heading to the pulpit to pronounce a panegyric upon St. Thomas for a festival, Giulio's cowl falls back as he moves through the crowded church. A female voice exclaims, "Good God, how handsome!" Immediately, Giulio fills with excitement, this woman's words filling his heart with pleasure and attraction. His flesh being, which he had hoped to end by joining the monastery, springs back to life upon seeing and hearing this woman, whose name he later learns in Theresa. Theresa is the young wife of a much older man, whom she cares for as her father.

Theresa and Giulio fall in love, Giulio falling in and out of stuporous love; he at times remembers why he joined the monastery, and attempts to force her away from him, so that they shall never see each other again and his flesh existence shall end. Yet, in her absence, Giulio grows destitute, for he loves her, and has proclaimed such to her, and bitterly wants to be with her. Giulio realizes that the "love without bounds" and "sacrilege" (Theresa's unfaithfulness to her husband) parts of his destiny have been fulfilled in his relationship with Theresa.

Giulio avoids seeing Theresa to attempt to recover his spiritual tranquility. While doing so, he learns that she has fallen very ill and weak, and is near to death. Father Ambrosio, not knowing of Giulio's relationship with Theresa, orders Giulio to visit her at her house to console her and her husband. Upon seeing Theresa in her bed, Giulio exclaims to her, "Giulio is thine for ever... Thou shalt live! Thy lover is with thee! My Theresa!" Theresa is renewed with vitality, and over several days of Giulio's visiting her, she is nursed back to health. They begin an intimate sexual relationship.

Soon after, Giulio remembers his reasons for joining the monastery and tells Theresa they must separate forever. He tells her "You know not all you have to fear!" Theresa, timid, has difficulty understanding what Giulio means, and always offers her love as a remedy for his apparent sorrows. Theresa attempts repeatedly to tenderize Giulio with her love, while Giulio accuses Theresa of sparking his misery. Eventually, he ceases all contact with her for some time.

Theresa is determined to visit Giulio again and speak with him, for she has become pregnant with his child. She wants to convince Giulio to leave the monastery so he can father the child. She visits him during Sunday mass and throws herself to his feet, begging Giulio to give her the key to the monastery garden so she can meet him there that midnight. She tells him, "It is not my life alone that depends on you!" Giulio, angered at the "Wretched woman," does not understand what this means, and Theresa says she will tell him if he agrees to her request to meet at the garden. Giulio agrees.

Giulio meets Theresa at the garden at midnight. He tells her, "Speak your purpose, the moments are precious... Theresa, I adore you! Without you life is an insupportable burden: yet even in your arms I feel the torments of remorse." Theresa tells Giulio: "Giulio, had it been only for myself I would not have sought this interview.... Come, then, Giulio, let us depart! Everything is prepared for our flight!" Before she mentions her pregnancy, Giulio, in a swift rush of emotion, escapes her arms, yells "No! Never!," and plunges a dagger into her chest, killing her.

At dawn, Giulio takes Theresa's body and throws it into the sea. He rushes into the church, declares himself a murderer, and is seized and never seen again.

== Inspiration for "Giulio" ==
At the end of the story as printed in Bourrienne's Memoirs, it is noted that Bonaparte's story is based on real, similar events which occurred at a monastery in Lyon that Bonaparte became knowledgeable of.
