= Joseph Maddison (disambiguation) =

Joseph Maddison could refer to:

- Joseph Maddison (1850–1923), New Zealand architect
- Joseph Maddison (trade unionist) (born 1838), British iron worker

== See also ==
- Joe Madison, American radio host
