= Lucraft =

Lucraft is a surname. Notable people with the surname include:

- Benjamin Lucraft (1809 – 1897), English craftsman and radical
- Mark Lucraft (born 1961), English barrister and judge
