= Charles-Maxime de Villemarest =

French writer

Charles-Maxime Catherinet de Villemarest was a 19th-century French writer. He authored a three-volume biography of Prince Talleyrand, published in 1835. He was credited with editing the memoirs of Bourrienne, but perhaps also largely wrote them. He also ghost-wrote the memoirs of the femme de chambre of Empress Josephine, one Mme. D'Avrillon.
