= John Hales (trade unionist) =

British trade unionist

John Hales (1839 – fl.1882) was a British trade unionist and radical activist who served as secretary of the International Workingmen's Association.

Born in Ireland, Hales came to prominence as the leader of the small Elastic Web Weavers of London union. He championed the right of women to join the union, something so opposed by a minority that they falsely accused him of embezzlement. He was suspended while an investigation took place, but was cleared.

In 1866, he became an early member of the International Workingmen's Association's (IWMA) General Council, and he persuaded his union to affiliate to the association later the same year. Also interested in land reform, he proposed that it work with supporters of Bronterre O'Brien to create a Labour League to act as the British section of the international. Karl Marx spoke against the proposal, and instead a separate organisation was established, named the "Land and Labour League" on Hales' proposal. He was also active in the peace movement, as a founder member of the British section of the International League of Peace and Liberty.

In 1871, Hales became general secretary of the IWMA, and from early 1872 also acted as its United States corresponding secretary. He lost these positions in the summer of 1872, when the headquarters of the organisation were moved to New York City, against his opposition. In November, he led a split in the British Federation of the IWMA, disassociating it from the American leadership and from Marx. With the support of Johann Eccarius, Hermann Jung and Thomas Mottershead, he called a congress of the Federation with the intention of turning it into a political party with trade union backing. They signed up to the new St Imer International, despite having little in common with its anarchist leadership, and the organisation soon ceased to have any importance.

During the early 1870s, Hales was a member of the Tower Hamlets Radical Electoral Committee, and rallied its members in support of Frederick Maxse's unsuccessful candidacy at the 1874 UK general election. Hales himself stood twice for the London School Board in Hackney: in 1870 he took more than 5,000 votes, while in 1882 he was further from election.

Hales established the radical Commonwealth Club in Bethnal Green, and thereafter represented it on various committees. In 1877, he was its delegate to the Universal Socialist Congress in Ghent, where he argued strongly for prioritising Parliamentary action, this position ultimately being won, against the wishes of the anarchist delegates. He also represented the Commonwealth Club on the committee of the Land Reform Union. In 1880, he was elected as the secretary of the Labour Representation League, succeeding Henry Broadhurst, though the league achieved little under his leadership, and dissolved in 1882.

Hales' life after 1882 is unknown, but he was remembered by George Lansbury as a friend and important influence on his early life and interest in socialism.

Political offices
Preceded by Johann Eccarius	General Secretary of the International Workingmen's Association; 1871–1872	Succeeded by Friedrich Sorge
Party political offices
Preceded by Henry Broadhurst	Secretary of the Labour Representation League; 1880–1882	Organisation dissolved
