= Arthur Waudby =

English painter (1821–1872)

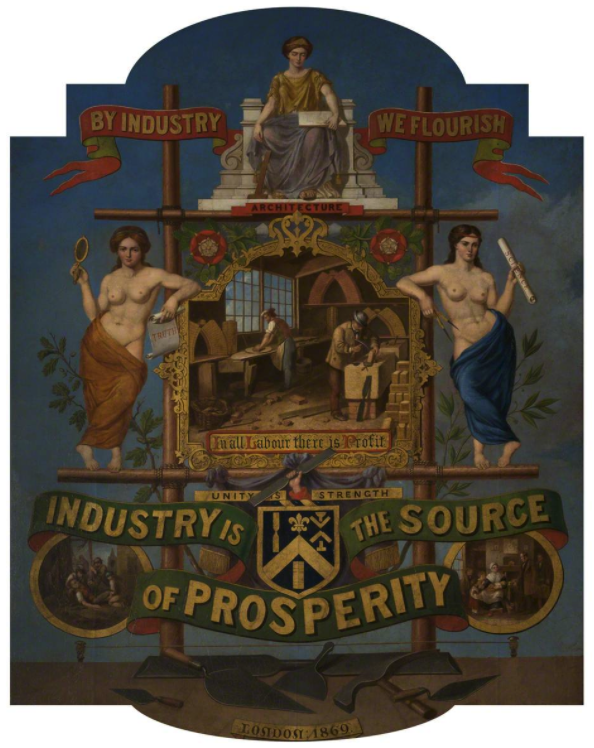
Operative Bricklayers' Society emblem, (1869) currently held in the People's History Museum, Manchester

Arthur Waudby (c. 1821–1872) was an English painter of the nineteenth century who specialised in carrying out work for the trade union movement.

He published his first book Sketches on the Wye in 1839 when he was 18 and by 1844 he exhibited The Student, his first painting, at the Royal Academy. In 1847 he exhibited two more paintings, Devotion and An Interior of a Cottage. In 1861 he started emblematic trade union work providing the designs of a certificate and banner for the Operative Bricklayers' Society.
