= Martin J. Boon =

Martin James Boon (1840-1888) was a radical trade unionist. In 1869 he participated in the establishment of the Land and Labour League of which he was a secretary until it ceased operation in 1873. Despite having penned a pamphlet opposing emigration, he emigrated to South Africa, and wrote a further pamphlet on railway nationalisation as well as idiosyncratic histories of the Orange Free State and South Africa. The latter contained considerable fragments of a personal memoir and includes the only contemporary history of the Land and Labour League.

Attended the General Council of the First International in 1871.
