= Edmund Phipps (civil servant) =

British civil servant

Sir Edmund Bampfylde Phipps CB (1869–1947) was a British senior civil servant.

Phipps was the son of Ramsay Weston Phipps and Anne Bampfylde. He was educated at New College, Oxford. Phipps was appointed a Companion of the Order of the Bath while Principal Assistant Secretary at the Board of Education in 1916. He was made a knight bachelor in the 1918 New Year Honours in recognition of his role as General Secretary to the Ministry of Munitions from 1916 to 1917 during the First World War.

He was photographed by Walter Stoneman in May 1940; the portrait is in the collection of the National Portrait Gallery, London. He was the father of Nicholas Phipps.
