= Operative Society of Masons, Quarrymen and Allied Trades of England and Wales =

Former trade union of the United Kingdom

Operative Society of Masons
- Operative Society of Masons, Quarrymen and Allied Trades of England and Wales
- Merged into: Amalgamated Union of Building Trade Workers
- Founded: 23 March 1833
- Dissolved: 1921
- Location: United Kingdom
- Members: 19,682 (1899)
- Key people: Richard Harnott (Gen Sec)

The Operative Society of Masons, Quarrymen and Allied Trades of England and Wales was a trade union representing stonemasons and related workers in the United Kingdom.

The union was founded in 1833 as the Friendly Society of Operative Stonemasons of England, Ireland and Wales. Initially a loose federation of local unions, it expanded rapidly, reaching 4,000 members and one hundred branches by 1835, and gradually increased its national activity. However, its involvement with the Operative Builders Union led to difficulties, with funds running out and membership dropping to only 2,000. 1836 proved far more successful, membership rebounding and finances settled, but ran into difficulties again in 1842 after disputes relating to the construction of the Houses of Parliament.

The union grew slowly through the 1840s, focusing on local disputes and absorbing the remaining local unions - the last being the Bristol Operative Stonemasons' Society, which joined in 1849. However, ite constantly suffered from financial problems. From 1847, it banned masters from membership, limiting itself to employed workers. In 1859 and 1860, it led a one year strike in opposition to "The Document", and it also held a leading role in the Nine Hours Movement. As a result, by the 1860s, it was the second largest union in the UK, after the Amalgamated Society of Engineers.

In its early years, a key objective for the union was banning worked stone from being transported to another town without its consent. After several unsuccessful attempts to introduce this rule in parts of Lancashire, it was successful in Sheffield in 1862, and by 1867 was able to apply the policy nationally. As a result, by the start of the 1870s, it was the most influential union in the building trades. However, an 1877 strike for a wage increase of 10d per hour was defeated, leading to a drop in membership, which fell from 27,200 to 12,600, and there were subsequent wage cuts and increases in hours instituted by employers.

The union's membership rose again in the 1890s, peaking at 19,682 in 1899, but fell to only 7,055 by 1910. By this point, its policy was in favour of a single union for the building trades. At the start of 1921, it merged with the London Order of Bricklayers and the Manchester Unity of Bricklayers to form the Amalgamated Union of Building Trade Workers.

== General Secretaries ==
1833: George Bevan
1834: Angus McGregor
1836: James Rennie
1838: Thomas Shortt
1843: Thomas Carter
1847: Richard Harnott
1872: James Edward Dyer
1883: William Hancock
1910: William Williams
