= Operative Bricklayers' Society =

Former trade union of the United Kingdom

O.B.S.
- Operative Bricklayers' Society
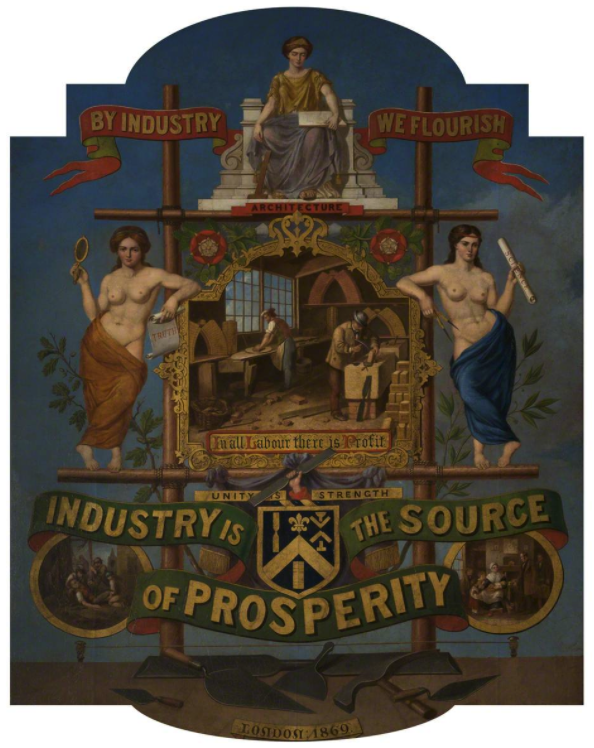
- Merged into: Amalgamated Union of Building Trade Workers
- Founded: 1818
- Dissolved: 1921
- Location: United Kingdom
- Members: 38,830 (1900)
- Key people: George Howell

The Operative Bricklayers' Society (OBS) was a British New Model Trade Union based in London.

== History ==
The society was founded in 1818 as the London Bricklayers' Society, but by 1829 had developed into a national operative union. By the 1840s the union had about 1,400 members, roughly 2% of the total number of bricklayers in the country at the time.

In 1848, twelve former members of the Operative Bricklayers refounded the organisations as the London Order of Operative Bricklayers' Society. They led a strike in 1851 which won an early finish on Saturdays, and in 1854 succeeded in gaining a wage increase for bricklayers in the capital. In 1859 the union became embroiled in a dispute with employers over the introduction of a nine-hour working day, and the consequential London builders' strike was led by George Howell. The OBS was defeated, and subsequently only developed very gradually outside London. In 1867, the union increased contributions from 3d to 10½d a week, and membership dropped from 5,000 to 2,000. However, in the long run, this improved the union's financial position and strength, and by 1877 it had 6,749 members.

By 1900 the union had 38,830 members, but roughly half were based in London. In 1921 the OBS merged with the Manchester Unity of Operative Bricklayers' Society and the Operative Society of Masons, Quarrymen and Allied Trades of England and Wales to form the Amalgamated Union of Building Trade Workers (AUBTW).

The People's History Museum in Manchester holds the original emblem painting of the Operative Bricklayers' Society. It was painted in 1869 by Royal Academician Arthur Waudby, and hung in the Bricklayers' Head Office in London. It shows the society's work, proudly depicting the bricklayers' trade along with symbols of truth, architecture and science.

== Secretaries ==
1848: Henry Turff
1860: Edwin Coulson
1891: John Batchelor
1919: George Hicks
