= Tom Proctor (trade unionist) =

British trade unionist and politician

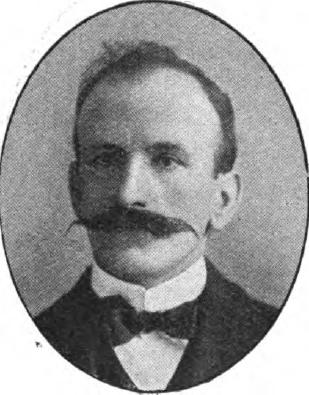
- Born: Thomas Proctor; 1855; Nottingham, United Kingdom
- Died: 1925; Plymouth, Devon, England
- Occupation(s): Trade unionist, politician

Thomas Proctor (1855 – 1925) was a British trade unionist and Labour Party politician.

Born in Nottingham, Proctor left school at the age of twelve, and when he was fifteen, he travelled to France and joined Giuseppe Garibaldi's Army of the Vosges; fighting in the Franco-Prussian War. Although he was captured and taken prisoner, he was deported back to the United Kingdom on the grounds of his nationality and youth.

Proctor returned to Nottingham where he completed an apprenticeship in engineering, before travelling to Australia. He returned to Nottingham once more within a few years, and devoted much of his time to the Amalgamated Society of Engineers, becoming its chairman within a few years. He also joined the Social Democratic Federation.

In 1890, Proctor moved to Plymouth to work in the Devonport Dockyard. He had an immediate impact on local labour organisation, founding a trades council in 1892. Despite early disagreements over whether to support Liberal-Labour candidates or only independent labour ones, it gradually grew in strength and hosted the national Trades Union Congress (TUC) in 1899.

Proctor had joined the Independent Labour Party (ILP) in the 1890s, and hosting the TUC enabled him to propose a special congress, early the following year, to discuss founding a new political party, independent of the Liberal Party, to contest local and national elections. This proposal gained support and, although Proctor had limited further involvement, the congress went ahead and founded the Labour Representation Committee (LRC).

In 1903, Proctor was adopted as the LRC candidate for the 1906 general election in Great Grimsby. Although he had no connection with the area, and remained resident in Plymouth, Proctor visited Grimsby frequently for a week at a time to campaign and give speeches, gradually attracting larger crowds to hear him. However, he ultimately finished in third place at the election, with 2,248 votes.

Proctor did not stand for Parliament again until the 1918 general election, when he was selected for Nottingham East by the renamed Labour Party, with the support of the ILP. He finished in second place there, with 2,817 votes. He also stood for election in Camborne at the 1922 general election, where he finished in third place with 4,512 votes. Proctor was never elected as an MP, nor did he ever contest another general election in his lifetime again.
