= 1918 United Kingdom embargo strike =

Embargo strike

Embargo strike (1918)
- Part of Labor Unions
- Date: July 23 – July 29, 1918 (107 years ago)
- Location: United Kingdom

The Embargo strike of July 1918, centered in industrial areas of Coventry and Birmingham in England, among munitions workers, involving 15,000 or more men, was not an ordinary dispute with employers, but an organized attempt to force the British government to cancel a particular embargo, which was an order passed by the Ministry of Munitions forbidding four manufacturing forms in Coventry from hiring additional skilled men without Ministry approval. This was to distribute scarce skilled labor more fairly. This caused controversy, and on 23 July 1918 12,000 members of the Amalgamated Society of Engineers and the Tool-makers, and the Steam Engine Makers went on strike, demanding for this embargo to be removed.

Then on July 25, the strike expanded to 100,000 munition workers.

On Saturday 27 July 1918 the Government issued a warning that the strikers in this strike must return to work, or they would lose their status as essential war workers and thus become liable to be conscripted into the armed forces. Many industrial workers outside the Embargo Strike organization were opposed to it and stayed at work in loyalty to the nation's war effort.

On Monday 29 July 1918 the strike was called off. There was afterwards a plan for a Government enquiry into the matter.
