= Minister of Munitions =

British government position in World War I

The Minister of Munitions was a British government position created during the First World War to oversee and co-ordinate the production and distribution of munitions for the war effort. The position was created in response to the Shell Crisis of 1915 when there was much newspaper criticism of the shortage of artillery shells and fear of sabotage. The Ministry was created by the Munitions of War Act 1915 passed on 2 July 1915 to safeguard the supply of artillery munitions. Under the very vigorous leadership of Liberal party politician David Lloyd George, the Ministry in its first year set up a system that dealt with labour disputes and fully mobilized Britain's capacity for a massive increase in the production of munitions.

The government policy, according to historian J. A. R. Marriott, was that:

No private interest was to be permitted to obstruct the service, or imperil the safety, of the State. Trade Union regulations must be suspended; employers' profits must be limited, skilled men must fight, if not in the trenches, in the factories; man-power must be economized by the dilution of labour and the employment of women; private factories must pass under the control of the State, and new national factories be set up. Results justified the new policy: the output was prodigious; the goods were at last delivered.

== Wartime role ==
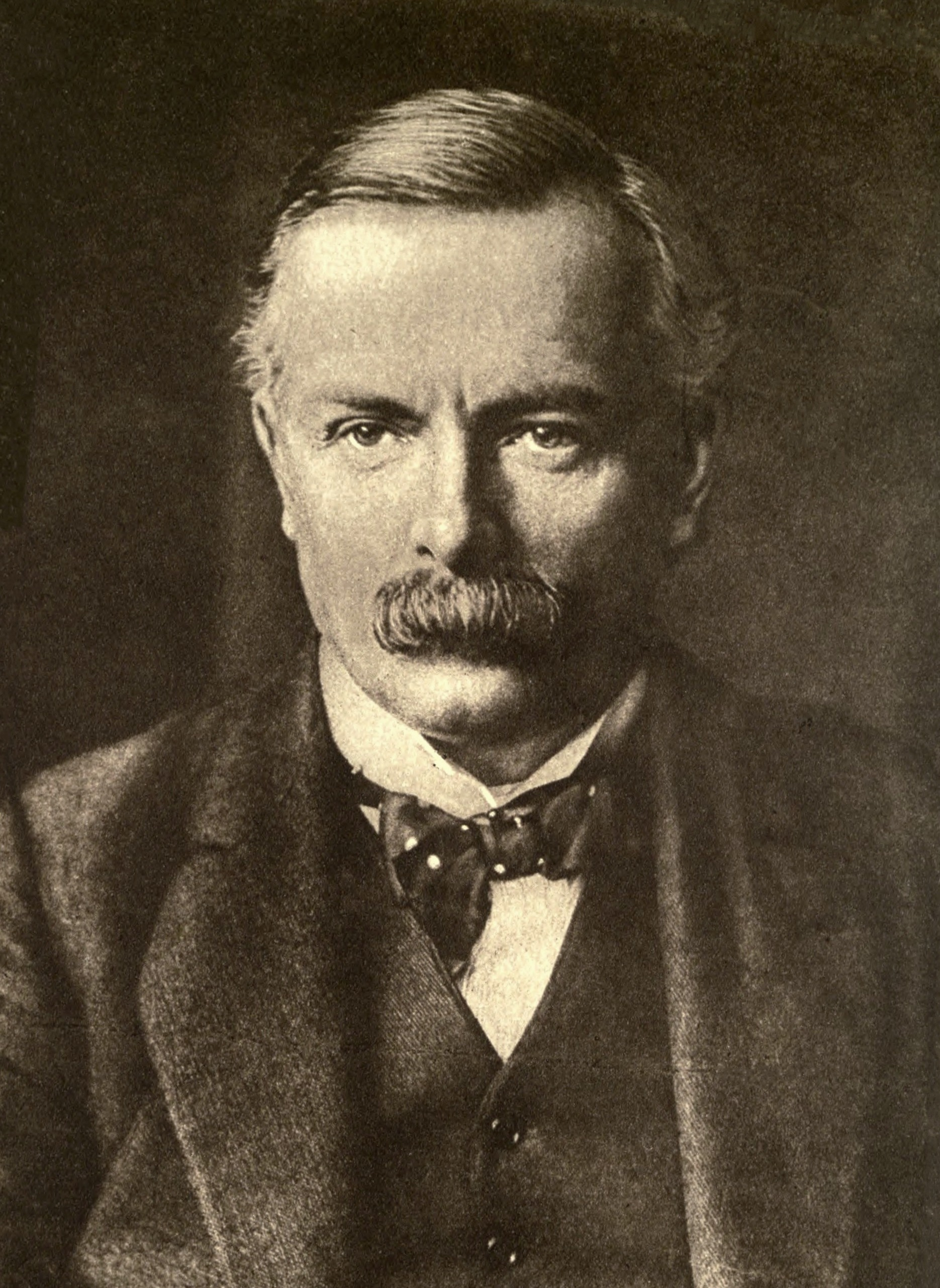
David Lloyd George, Minister in 1915–1916

David Lloyd George gained a heroic reputation with his energetic work as Minister of Munitions, from 1915 to 1916, setting the stage for his political rise. When the Shell Crisis of 1915 dismayed public opinion, with the news that the Army was running short of artillery ammunition, demands arose for a strong leader to take charge of munitions production. A new coalition ministry was formed in May 1915 and Lloyd George was made Minister of Munitions, in a new department created to solve the munitions shortage.

In this position David Lloyd George addressed labour disputes on the Clyde, concerning lowering of wages by 'dilution' of skilled labour, and he called for an enquiry into the conditions of munitions workers that led to labour intelligence services being transferred to his Ministry, under Colonel Arthur Lee, Parliamentary Military Secretary. He received acclaim for a big rise in output of munitions, which greatly contributed to his political ascent to Prime Minister in late 1916 and leadership of the five man War Cabinet. Many historians agree that he boosted national morale and focused attention on the urgent need for greater output but many also say the increase in munitions output from 1915 to 1916 was due largely to reforms already decided, though not yet effective, before he arrived. American historian R. J. Q. Adams provided details that showed that the Ministry broke through the cumbersome bureaucracy of the War Office, resolved labour problems, rationalized the supply system and dramatically increased production. Within a year it became the largest buyer, seller and employer in Britain.

To improve efficiency and public relations the Ministry opened a department focused on workers' welfare. It improved first aid conditions; promoted factory safety; handled medical conditions induced by the handling of dangerous chemicals and TNT; provided day care for children; limited overtime; and sometimes provided transportation and lodging for workers.

The Ministry was staffed at the top levels by senior army men and businessmen loaned by their companies for the duration of the war. These men were able to coordinate the needs of big business with those of the state and reach a compromise on price and profits. Government agents bought essential supplies from abroad. Once bought, the Ministry would control their distribution in order to prevent speculative price rises and to enable normal marketing to continue. The whole of the Indian jute crop, for example, was bought and distributed in this way. Steel, wool, leather and flax came under similar controls. By 1918 the Ministry had a staff of 65,000 people, employing some 3 million workers in over 20,000 factories with large numbers of women new to engineering work for the duration of the war. The post was abolished in 1921, as part of a cutback of government and as a delayed result of the Armistice in 1918.

== Ministers of Munitions, 1915–1921 ==
Name	Party	Entered office	Left office
David Lloyd George	Liberal Party	25 May 1915	9 July 1916
Edwin Montagu	Liberal Party	9 July 1916	10 December 1916
Christopher Addison	Liberal Party	10 December 1916	17 July 1917
Winston Churchill	Liberal Party	17 July 1917	10 January 1919
Andrew Weir, 1st Baron Inverforth	Liberal Party	10 January 1919	21 March 1921

== Parliamentary Secretaries to the Ministry of Munitions, 1916–1919 ==
Name	Entered office	Left office
Laming Worthington-Evans	14 December 1916	30 January 1918
F. G. Kellaway	14 December 1916	1 April 1920
J. E. B. Seely	10 July 1918	10 January 1919
John Baird	10 January 1919	29 April 1919

== Parliamentary and Financial Secretaries to the Ministry of Munitions, 1918–1921 ==
Name	Entered office	Left office
Laming Worthington-Evans	30 January 1918	18 July 1918
James Hope	27 January 1919	31 March 1921

== Permanent Secretary, Ministry of Munitions, 1915–1921 ==
Name	Entered office	Left office
Hubert Llewellyn Smith	1915	1916
Edmund Bampfylde Phipps	1916	1917
W. Graham Greene	1917	1920
Sigmund Dannreuther	1920	1921
Daniel Neylan	1920	1921

== See also ==
- UK Embargo strike (1918)

== Primary sources ==
- Lloyd George, David. War Memoirs (2nd ed. 1934) volume 1 chapter 9. 19
