= Alfred Golightly =

British trade unionist and co-operator

- Born: Alfred William Golightly; 21 October 1857; Lincoln, England
- Died: 18 March 1948 (aged 90)
- Movement: Trade union; Co-operative

Alfred William Golightly (21 October 1857 – 18 March 1948) was a British trade unionist and co-operative activist.

Born in Lincoln, Golightly grew up in Peterborough, and attended the Great Northern Railway Company's British School. He completed an engineering apprenticeship on the railways, and became a fitter in Sheffield, joining the Amalgamated Society of Engineers (ASE) in 1878.

Golightly net moved to Manchester, and in 1892, he was elected to the ASE's national council, representing Division 3, and relocating to London. He joined the Stratford Co-operative Society, becoming its president in 1897. He was elected to the Leyton Urban District Council in 1898, serving for 21 years in total, including a period as chair.

In 1903, he was elected as chairman of the council of the ASE, but he lost his seat later in the year, because he had opposed proposed strike action on Clydeside. The following year, he was president of the Co-operative Congress, and from 1915, he served on the board of the Co-operative Wholesale Society, while working in the company's engineering department. He retired from work and trade unionism in 1929, but remained active in local politics, serving on Chigwell Council from 1938.

Trade union offices
Preceded by New position	Group 3 representative on the Executive Council of the Amalgamated Society of Engineers; 1893–1903	Succeeded by William Thomas Kelly
Preceded by Alfred Sellicks	Chairman of the Amalgamated Society of Engineers; 1903	Succeeded by David Gardner
