= James Thomas Brownlie =

British trade unionist and politician

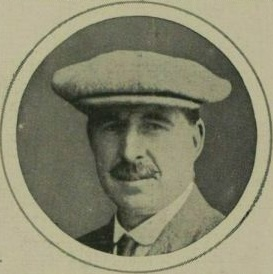
Brownlie in 1919

James Thomas Brownlie (23 June 1865 – 13 October 1938) was a British trade unionist and politician.

Born in Port Glasgow, Brownlie was educated at Wason’s Academy in Paisley. He became an apprentice blacksmith, then changed to an engineering apprenticeship. In the late 1880s, he moved to London to work at the Royal Arsenal, and became active in the Amalgamated Society of Engineers (ASE).

Brownlie first came to prominence as a member of the executive of the Royal Arsenal Co-operative Society from 1899. He became active in the Labour Party, for which he stood, unsuccessfully, in Govan at the January 1910 general election. In 1913, he was elected as Chairman of the ASE; when this was reformed as the Amalgamated Engineering Union in 1920, he became its first president. In this role, he chaired a joint committee of engineering unions which, in the aftermath of World War I, negotiated the 47-hour working week. During this period, he also served on the National Advisory Committee on War Output and the executive of the International Metalworkers' Federation.

At the 1918 general election, Brownlie stood in Crewe, taking second place with 43.8% of the vote. From 1919, he served on the executive of Ruskin College, and he also sat on a number of government committee in the 1920s, including the Balfour Committee on Industry and Trade.

Brownlie retired from his trade union posts in 1930. He stood for Labour at the Sunderland by-election in 1931, taking 39.8% of the votes cast, but did not stand in the general election later the same year.

Trade union offices
Preceded by Albert Taylor	Chairman of the Amalgamated Society of Engineers; 1913–1920	Succeeded by Position abolished
Preceded by New position	President of the Amalgamated Engineering Union; 1920–1930	Succeeded by William Harold Hutchinson
Preceded by Ebby Edwards and John Marchbank	Trades Union Congress representative to the American Federation of Labour; 1929; With: James Bell	Succeeded by Allan Findlay and Arthur Shaw
