= William Newton (trade unionist) =

British trade unionist, journalist and Chartist

- Born: 1822; Congleton, Cheshire, England
- Died: 9 March 1876; London, England
- Occupation(s): Trade Unionist, Journalist
- Movement: Chartism
- Spouse: Emma née Baxter M 1842

William Newton (1822 – 9 March 1876) was a British trade unionist, journalist and Chartist.

== Biography ==
Newton was born in Congleton, Cheshire; his father, William Newton, was an engineer. He completed an apprenticeship in engineering in Etruria, Staffordshire. In 1840, he joined the Journeymen Steam Engine and Machine Makers' Society, and moved to London soon afterwards.

Newton continued to work in engineering in London, becoming a foreman, but he was sacked in 1848 for his trade union activities. He became the manager of a pub in Ratcliff Cross, and turned it into a base for the Steam Engine Makers. Working with William Allan, he proposed merging the many small craft unions to form a large body. This was achieved in 1851, with the establishment of the Amalgamated Society of Engineers (ASE), and Newton then published and edited The Operative, a newspaper linked with the new union.

Newton also served on the ASE's executive, and introduced a motion for members to stop working overtime and piece-work. This was passed, and led to a major lock-out in 1852. During the lock-out, Newton toured the country giving speeches, but the action was eventually lost. Newton left the union's executive and began instead promoting the creation of producer co-operatives, although he continued to speak in support of the principle of trade unionism. He was also influenced by William James Linton's republicanism.

At the 1852 United Kingdom general election, Newton stood as an independent Chartist candidate in Tower Hamlets. The first independent candidate from the labour movement in the UK, he took more than 1,000 votes but last place in the poll. Encouraged by his performance, he proposed creating a national political party to campaign for universal male suffrage. Although there was some interest in his proposal, the national Chartist leadership rejected the idea.

Newton then devoted much of his time to newspaper publication: firstly, The Englishman, then from 1858 to 1876, the East London Observer. He was also elected as president of the Labour Representation League. He was elected to serve on the Stepney vestry, later becoming its chairman, and the Mile End Old Town representative on the Metropolitan Board of Works. He stood again for Parliament in Tower Hamlets at the 1868 United Kingdom general election, this time as a radical aligned with the Liberal Party, and finally at the 1876 Ipswich by-election, but came bottom of the poll on each occasion.

He married Emma née Baxter, the daughter of a labourer, in 1842. The couple had a daughter. He became ill with Bright's disease and other problems, and died in London in 1876.
