= Jenkin Jones (trade unionist) =

Welsh trade unionist

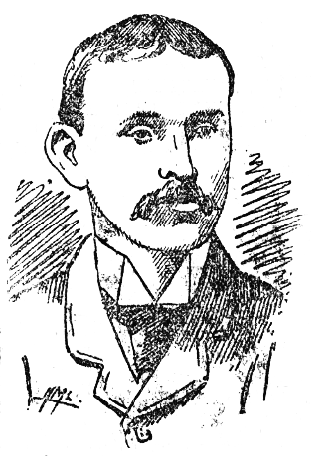
Jones in 1893

Jenkin Jones (1859 – 7 December 1929) was a Welsh trade unionist.

Born in Cadoxton-juxta-Neath in South Wales, Jones was educated until he was sixteen, then served as a pupil-teacher for a year. Although he hoped to become a teacher, his father disapproved of this, and Jones instead completed an apprenticeship as a patternmaker with the Neath Abbey Ironworks Company. He continued to study science, maths and art at evening classes. By this time, the economy was in recession, and he struggled to find work, eventually finding a job manufacturing tin plate. When the economy picked up, he returned to the Neath Abbey Ironworks, becoming a supervisor, and also spending time as a boilermaker. In 1879, he joined the Amalgamated Society of Engineers (ASE). When the next trade depression hit, he was again out of work, and moved to Monmouthshire to find a new role.

In 1881, Jones settled in Cardiff, where he continued in his trade. He became increasingly prominent in the ASE, winning election to its general council in 1891. In 1892, this was replaced by an executive council, and Jones narrowly won election as a district delegate. He was also active on the Cardiff Trades Council, and represented his union at the Trades Union Congress.

Jones ran for the general secretaryship of the union in 1909, and narrowly defeated David Gardner, the union's chairman, by somewhat more than 18,000 votes to 15,000. His time in office was not a success, and has been described as "five of the most disruptive years in the history of the union". Late in 1912, the union's executive suspended him, but he persuaded the union's trustees to dissolve the executive and hold new elections for the general secretary post. This was the subject of a court case, which ultimately concluded that this action was within the powers of the trustees.

Jones stood in the new election and placed second in the first round of voting, defeating Tom Mann and three minor candidates (J. Gorman, J. Gradwell and H. Sladdin). In the run-off, he again came second, defeated by Robert Young, who described Jones as "unfit on the grounds of inefficiency to hold office".

Jones died in 1929, by which time he was living at his sister's house near Neath.

Trade union offices
Preceded by George Nicoll Barnes	General Secretary of the Amalgamated Society of Engineers; 1909–1913	Succeeded by Robert Young
