= William Glennie (trade unionist) =

Scottish trade unionist and political activist

William Glennie (born 1861) was a Scottish trade unionist and political activist.

Born in Glasgow, Glennie worked as an engineer. He joined the Amalgamated Society of Engineers (ASE), becoming its Tyneside District Secretary, and also serving a term as president of the Newcastle Trades Council.

In 1891, Glennie stood in the election to become general secretary of the ASE, but took only 738 votes, to John Anderson's 18,102, and 17,152 for Tom Mann. In 1895, he was elected as the union's assistant general secretary, serving until 1921, when the union became the Amalgamated Engineering Union (AEU). He continued as assistant general secretary of the AEU until his retirement, in 1926.

Early in life, Glennie joined the Liberal Federation, then moved to the Social Democratic Federation, although he played little role in the party. At the 1918 UK general election, he stood for the Labour Party in Kennington, taking 25.4% of the vote, and third place.
