= Reginald Essenhigh =

Reginald Clare Essenhigh (7 September 1890 – 1 November 1955) was a Conservative Party Member of Parliament (MP) from 1931 to 1935 and a judge from 1936 to 1955.

He was born in Warrington, Lancashire and was the younger son of Henry Streeter Essenhigh and Elizabeth Clare. He was later to assume his mother's maiden name. He was educated at Warrington Secondary School and the Manchester School of Art. He originally worked for a local cable manufacture company. He subsequently gained a scholarship to the Royal College of Art in London, where he studied applied art and architecture.

On the outbreak of World War I, he joined the University of London Officer Training Corps before being commissioned as a Special Reserve officer in the 3rd (Reserve) Battalion, Manchester Regiment. He rose to the rank of captain before losing his leg in action during a coastal assault on 27 June 1917 at Nieuport on the Belgian coast.

While recuperating in hospital, he studied law. He was called to the bar by Gray's Inn in January 1922. He practised on the Northern Circuit. In 1924 he married Dr Helen Hogg of Cambuslang, Glasgow, and they had four children.

He stood as a Conservative candidate in the 1929 general election. He contested the Newton constituency of Lancashire, but lost by over 6,000 votes to the sitting Labour MP Robert Young. As Labour's vote collapsed at the 1931 general election, Essenhigh stood again and took the seat with a majority of only 381 votes. Young regained the seat at the 1935 general election, and Essenhigh did not seek election again.

In 1936 Essenhigh was appointed a county judge for Circuit No.13, which included parts of Derbyshire and Yorkshire and included the city of Sheffield. He retained this position until his death, aged 65, in 1955.

His granddaughter is the artist Inka Essenhigh.

Parliament of the United Kingdom
Preceded by Robert Young	Member of Parliament for Newton; 1931–1935	Succeeded by Robert Young
