= Richard Harnott =

British trade union leader

Richard Harnott (1807 – 7 February 1872) was a British trade union leader.

Harnott worked as a stonemason and became active in the Operative Society of Masons. In 1847, he was elected as the union's general secretary, and focused on centralising the operations of the union. As was customary in unions of the period, its headquarters moved from town to town, spending a few years in each one, and Harnott in time was based in Liverpool, Leeds, Bolton, Bradford and Bristol. The central committee was provided by the local branch in the town, and Harnott's willingness to move meant that he was soon by far the most experienced union official.

In his early years, Harnott was only narrowly re-elected each year, many branches disliking his centralisation and his refusal to give permission for breaches of the union's rules. His support gradually increased, the biggest turning point being in 1863 when a threatening letter and rope tied in a noose were sent to him, suspected to be from Henry Faulkner, a leader of the Manchester branch. This shocked members, and discouraged further dissent.

While Harnott had little involvement with the national trade union movement, and in opposing compulsory conciliation, he stood in direct opposition to the "Junta", he did send a delegation to Scotland to help the United Operative Masons' Association of Scotland rebuild after it almost collapsed in 1878. The success of this led to other delegations to areas of England and Wales where the union lacked organisation, in an attempt to recruit, a new idea among trade unions. Under his leadership, the idea of a seasonal strike was developed - only during the summer months, when masons were more in demand.

Harnott led the union through successive victories, facing down an 1858 attempt by a new Federation of Master Builders to introduce hourly payments with national strike action. By 1860, it had achieved a nine-hour working day across most of Lancashire. A major attempt by employers in 1869 to impose hourly payment was again largely defeated, although in Liverpool and Manchester the masons were eventually defeated.

In 1867, the union decided to appoint an assistant secretary, with a Mr Atkins being the choice of most lodges. However, when sending out voting papers, Harnott included a note asking members not to vote for Atkins, as he disliked him. Atkins was defeated by James Dyer. This was in defiance of the union's rules and hugely controversial, but Harnott gained the support of the union's committee, and won a vote of confidence from members in his conduct.

By 1870, Harnott was suffering from declining health, but he continued to work long hours, with Dyer assisting, effectively as a clerk. On his death, the Manchester Times declared that Harnott has been "as well known in trade circles as Mr Gladstone is in the political world".

Trade union offices
Preceded by Thomas Carter	General Secretary of the Operative Society of Masons; 1847–1872	Succeeded by Richard Dyer
