= Manchester Unity of Bricklayers =

Former trade union of the United Kingdom

The Manchester Unity of Bricklayers, also known as the Manchester Unity of Operative Bricklayers Society (MUOBS) and the United Operative Bricklayers' Trade Protection Society, was a trade union representing bricklayers in the United Kingdom.

The union originated from a split in the Operative Society of Bricklayers in 1848, although it dated its own formation from various dates between 1829 and 1833, seeing itself as a direct continuation of the former organisation. Despite its name, it was never restricted to Manchester, instead operating throughout the United Kingdom. Initially, it had around 1,000 members, as did the rival London Order of Bricklayers, but this fluctuated significantly, peaking at 8,033 in 1877, but falling to only 1,275 in 1887, reaching 4,300 again in 1899, but dropping back to only 1,655 in 1910.

The union devoted much of its efforts to welfare benefits, although it also campaigned for limits on the number of apprenticeships, and against hourly pay. After many years of rivalry and negotiations with the London Order, the two finally merged in 1921, when they were also joined by the Operative Society of Masons in forming the Amalgamated Union of Building Trade Workers.

== General Secretaries ==
to 1844: Sam Law
1844: John C. Lockett
c.1860: M. J. O'Neill
1868: George Houseley
1890: George H. Clarke
1914: John Gregory
