= William Allan (trade unionist) =

British trade unionist (1813–1874)

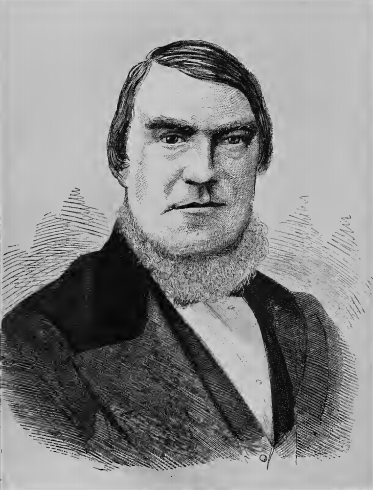
Allan in 1873

William Allan (August or September 1813 – 15 October 1874) was a British trade unionist.

Born in Ulster, Allan grew up in Glasgow, working in a cotton mill from the age of twelve, then later serving an engineering apprenticeship. However, before completing the apprenticeship, he married and moved to Liverpool, soon finding work with the Grand Junction Railway Company. He later moved to Crewe to further his career, and while there joined the Manchester Society of Mechanics and also the Journeymen Steam Engine and Machine Makers' Friendly Society ("Old Mechanics"), two early trade unions.

In 1847, Henry Selsby, the secretary of the Old Mechanics, was arrested for supporting engineers who were on strike, and the following year he resigned, with Allan elected to take his place. Allan was in favour of union amalgamations, and he worked with William Newton to bring together several branches of other unions to form the Amalgamated Society of Engineers, the first example of what became known as a "New Model Union". Some branches of the Old Mechanics did not join, but Allan persevered and by the end of 1851 had brought membership up to over 10,000.

Allan was also prominent in the national trade union movement. He instigated the formation of the London Trades Council, and was close to the members of the "Junta". He joined the Reform League, attended the first Conference of Amalgamated Trades and first Co-operative Congress, was the treasurer of the Labour Representation League, and although he was initially suspicious of the Trades Union Congress, he soon came to support it, becoming treasurer in 1871. He also became chair of the Bee-Hive newspaper for the labour movement in 1870.

During the 1870s, Allan gradually became less active due to suffering from Bright's disease, but he remained in his posts until his death in 1874.

Trade union offices
Preceded by Henry Selsby	Secretary of the Journeymen Steam Engine and Machine Makers' Friendly Society; 1848 – 1851	Succeeded by Henry Selsby
Preceded by New position	General Secretary of the Amalgamated Society of Engineers; 1850 – 1875	Succeeded by John Burnett
Preceded by New position	Treasurer of the Trades Union Congress; 1871 – 1873	Succeeded by Daniel Guile
