= Tom Danter =

Wales international rugby league & union footballer

Personal information
- Full name: Thomas Danter
- Born: 1 December 1922; Bridgend, Wales
- Died: September 1980 (aged 57)

Playing information

Rugby union
Club
Years	Team	Pld	T	G	FG	P
1948	Cardiff RFC	1

Rugby league
- Position: Prop
Club
Years	Team	Pld	T	G	FG	P
≤1949–≥51	Hull FC
	Hull Kingston Rovers	4	0	0	0	0
	Total	4	0	0	0	0
Representative
Years	Team	Pld	T	G	FG	P
1949–51	Wales	5	0	0	0	0

Thomas Danter (1 December 1922 – September 1980) was a Welsh rugby union, and professional rugby league footballer who played in the 1940s and 1950s. He played club level rugby union (RU) for Cardiff RFC, and representative level rugby league (RL) for Wales, and at club level for Hull FC and Hull Kingston Rovers, as a prop.

== Background ==
Tom Danter was born in Bridgend district, Wales.

== International honours ==
Danter won 5 caps for Wales in 1949–1951 while at Hull.
