= Journeymen Steam Engine, Machine Makers' and Millwrights' Friendly Society =

UK trade union

The Journeymen Steam Engine, Machine Makers' and Millwrights' Friendly Society, also known as the Old Mechanics, was an early trade union representing engineers in the United Kingdom.

The union was founded on 26 July 1826 in Manchester, when it was known as the Friendly Union of Mechanics. In its early years, it held an annual delegate meeting, which elected a different branch to run the union until the next meeting. It soon changed its name to the Journeymen Steam Engine and Machine Makers' Friendly Society, and focused on campaigning for shorter working hours and better pay for overtime. It also attempted to regulate the trade, by campaigning against the employment of workers who had not completed apprenticeships, and to limit the number of apprentices in the industry.

The union led an eight-month strike in 1836, which won a major victory in limiting the standard working day to ten hours. This boosted the profile of the union, which had 3,000 members by 1839, when it appointed a secretary for the first time. Initially part-time, the post became full-time in 1845, an unusual step for the period. The London Millwrights Societies merged with the Old Mechanics in 1841, which accordingly added "millwrights" to its name.

In 1846, the union's branches in Belfast, Rochdale and Newton-le-Willows began industrial action against piecework and systematic overtime. Several employers took the union's officers to court, and they along with twenty of its members were convicted of conspiracy and illegal combination, and imprisoned. Following national protests, they were released in 1847. This inspired William Allan and William Newton to invite numerous other unions to merge to form one large amalgamated body. This occurred in 1851, when the Old Mechanics dissolved into the Amalgamated Society of Engineers.

== General Secretaries ==
1826: John White
1839: Robert Robinson
Henry Selsby
1848: William Allan
1851: Henry Selsby
