= Johann Eccarius =

German trade unionist (1818–1889)

Johann Georg Eccarius
- Born: August 23, 1818; Friedrichroda, Duchy of Saxe-Gotha-Altenburg
- Died: March 5, 1889 (aged 70); London, United Kingdom
- Occupations: Political activist, writer, tailor
- Political party: League of the Just; Communist League; Land and Labour League; Manhood Suffrage League

Johann Georg Eccarius (also known as John George Eccarius; 23 August 1818 – 5 March 1889) was a Thuringian tailor and labour activist. Eccarius was a member of the League of the Just and later of the Communist League before becoming General Secretary of the International Workingmen's Association (IWA), commonly known as the First International, in 1867.

== Biography ==
=== Early years ===
Johann Georg Eccarius, also known by the Anglicized name John George Eccarius, was born on 23 August 1818 in Friedrichroda, Thuringia (today part of Germany).

=== Political career ===
Eccarius was a member of the League of the Just and later of the Communist League.

On 28 September 1864, Eccarius was a participant at the first meeting of the International Workingmen's Association (IWA) at St. Martin's Hall in London. Eccarius would there be chosen as a member of the governing General Council, a position he would retain until the transfer of the headquarters of the International to America in 1872. Eccarius would be a fixture of the IWA, attending every international conference and congress of that organization for its entire 8-year duration in Europe.

On 9 July 1867, General Secretary of the IWA Robert Shaw resigned his position owing to an inability to find work in London, which made his position as head of the General Council there untenable. Upon the nomination of journalist Peter Fox, Eccarius was unanimously elected the new head of that organization. He would serve as the formal head of the IWA until 1871.

From 1870 until 1872, Eccarius was the Corresponding Secretary of the IWA for America, serving as the point of contact with the organization's adherents on the other side of the Atlantic.

He served as treasurer for the short lived Land and Labour League from 1869 to 1873.

=== Later years ===
In the late 1870s, he was active in the Manhood Suffrage League.

=== Death and legacy ===
Eccarius died on 4 March 1889.

== Footnotes ==
Political offices
Preceded by W. R. Cremer	General Secretary of the International Workingmen's Association; 1867–1871	Succeeded by John Hales
