= Land and Labour League =

The Land and Labour League was formed in October 1869 by a group of radical trade unionists affiliated to the International Working Men's Association. Its formation was precipitated by discussion of the land question at the Basle Congress of 1869. The League advocated the full nationalisation of land, and was for a brief time the centre of a working class republican network in London, with its own paper, The Republican. Despite petering out by 1873 the League had some radicalising impact on the Land Tenure Reform Association established by John Stuart Mill, which adopted a policy of taxing the unearned increment on land value under pressure from the League.

Patrick Hennessey, an Irish trade unionist, was the League's President. The secretaries were Martin J. Boon and John Weston, and the treasurer was Johann Eccarius. Its executives included the republicans Charles Bradlaugh and George Odger. Benjamin Lucraft served on its council.
