= Joseph Maddison (trade unionist) =

British trade unionist

Joseph Maddison (born 1838) was a British trade unionist.

Maddison worked in an iron foundry in Newcastle upon Tyne, and joined the Friendly Society of Iron Founders. He spent eight years as a branch officer before, in 1886, he was elected as assistant general secretary of the union, then in 1894 he became general secretary.

Maddison supported the formation of the General Federation of Trade Unions and served as its first treasurer. He also supported the Labour Representation Committee, and backed his old friend Arthur Henderson as the union's first sponsored Parliamentary candidate.

In 1902, Maddison visited the United States to study foundry working methods there. The tour was sponsored by A. Mosely, who later proposed a Civic Federation Scheme of compulsory negotiations, which Maddison backed, but the union as a whole rejected.

Maddison turned seventy in 1908, and decided to retire.

Trade union offices
Preceded by William Henry Hey	Assistant General Secretary of the Friendly Society of Iron Founders; 1886–1894	Succeeded by Samuel Masterson
Preceded by William Henry Hey	General Secretary of the Friendly Society of Iron Founders; 1894–1908	Succeeded by William M. Lawson
Preceded by New position	Treasurer of the General Federation of Trade Unions; 1899–1908	Succeeded by David Gardner
