= Evan Daniel =

Welsh cleric and lecturer (1837–1904)

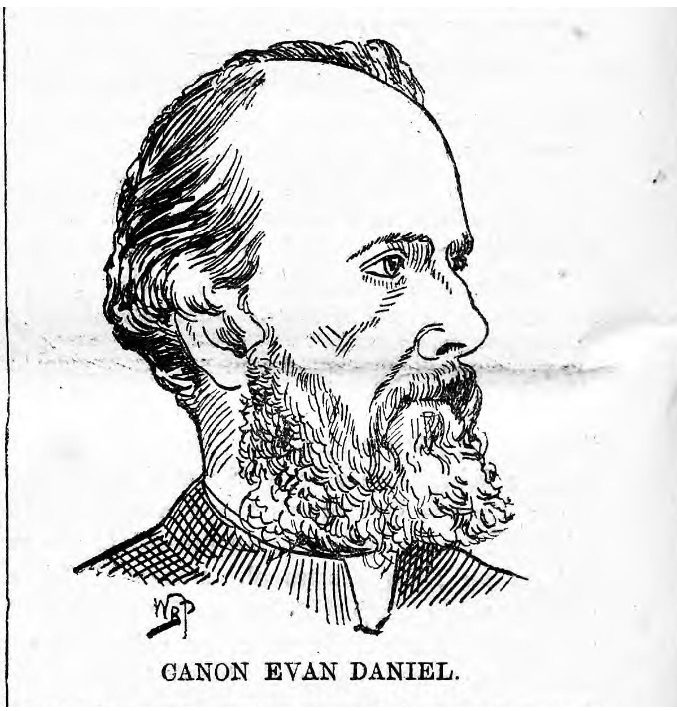
Evan Daniel 1889

Evan Daniel (1837–1904) was a Welsh cleric and lecturer. He was born in Pontypool, to his parents Evan and Sarah Davies, in September 1837. After completing secondary education, he studied at St. John's Training College, Battersea, where in 1859 he took up a position as a lecturer. He is recorded to have taken orders in 1863, and to have graduated (with honours) from Trinity College Dublin in 1870. He was appointed vicar of Horsham in 1894, which is where he died in May 1904.

His published writings include The Prayer-Book, its History and Contents, which was published in 1877.
