= New Model Union =

New Model Trade Unions (NMTU) were a variety of Trade Unions prominent in the 1850s and 1860s in the UK. The term was coined by Sidney and Beatrice Webb in their History of Trade Unionism (1894), although later historians have questioned how far New Model Trade Unions represented a 'new wave' of unionism, as portrayed by Webbs.

== Features of New Model Trade Unions ==
In contrast to the consolidated Unions (such as the Grand National Consolidated Trade Union) common in the 1830s and 1840s, New Model Unions tended to be restricted to individual trades. These were generally relatively highly paid skilled trades (including artisans), allowing the Unions to charge comparatively high subscription fees. Their leadership tended to be more reformist, with an emphasis on negotiations and education rather than strike action, and this led them to be viewed as more 'respectable'. This was partly because since they represented skilled workers, there was not a large source of labour for their trade which employers could draw upon in the event of a strike. This also led some New Model Unions to actually restrict apprenticeships to their trade, hoping to prevent falls in wages by keeping available labour scarce. Akin to earlier Friendly Societies, members of New Model Trade Unions received benefits in times of need, such as during periods of illness, injury and unemployment.

== The 'Junta' ==
The Webbs termed a group of leading New Model Unionists, who regularly met in London in the 1860s a junta. This group included:

- William Allan, Amalgamated Society of Engineers
- Robert Applegarth, Amalgamated Society of Carpenters and Joiners
- Edwin Coulson, Operative Bricklayers' Society
- Daniel Guile, Friendly Society of Iron Founders
- George Odger, Amalgamated Society of Ladies' Shoemakers

Other names associated with the group included William Randal Cremer, Robert Danter, William Dronfield, George Howell, John Kane, Alexander Macdonald and John D. Prior.

The group did not have a formal structure, but worked together throughout numerous organisations, including the Conference of Amalgamated Trades, and the early London Trades Council and Trades Union Congress. It did not have complete control of these bodies, facing opposition from George Potter and his supporters, led by Richard Harnott and Robert Last.

The Junta played an important role in advocating the benefits of New Model Unionism to the Royal Commission into trade unionism that took place in the late 1860s. Their influence ceased with the establishment of a parliamentary committee for trade unions, and the Trades Union Congress, in 1871.

== Prominent New Model Trade Unions ==
=== The Amalgamated Society of Engineers (ASE) ===
One of the earliest identified New Model Unions, founded in 1851, represented engineers across the United Kingdom. In January 1852, the union threatened strike action when engineering employers introduced systematic overtime and began to increase the numbers of unskilled workers in the trade. In response, the employers instituted a lockout, refusing to allow workers to return until they signed an agreement by which they renounced membership of any Trade Unions. After three months, the ASE was defeated and its members signed the employers' agreement, although the vast majority continued their membership of the union in secret. The ASE charged the relatively high subscription fee of one shilling per week. In 1896 it was again involved in an extended lockout, and in 1920 developed into the Amalgamated Engineering Union.

=== Amalgamated Society of Carpenters and Joiners ===
Led for a time in the 1860s by Robert Applegarth, and representing carpenters and joiners throughout the United Kingdom.
