= Louis Antoine Fauvelet de Bourrienne =

French diplomat (1769–1834)

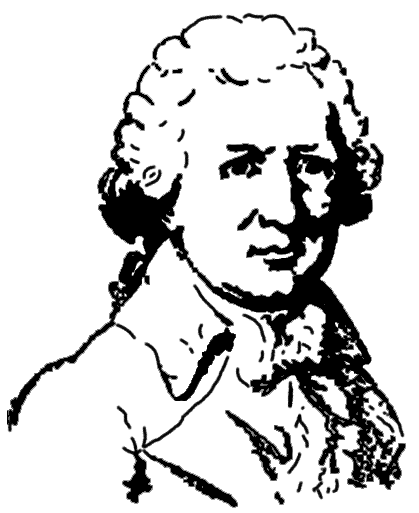
Louis Antoine Fauvelet de Bourrienne

Louis Antoine Fauvelet de Bourrienne (French pronunciation: [lwi ɑ̃twan fovlɛ də buʁjɛn]; July 9, 1769 – February 7, 1834) was a French diplomat, born in Sens. He is known primarily for his close relationship with Napoleon Bonaparte, of whom he wrote in detail in his celebrated memoirs.

== Biography ==
Bourrienne is famous for his Memoirs of Napoleon Bonaparte, a work based on years of intimate friendship and professional association. They met at the Military Academy at Brienne in Champagne when eight years old. Napoleon recalled the famous snowball battles that he masterminded: "Unfortunately the pleasure did not last long, for we put stones in the snowballs, so that many boys were injured, among them my friend Bourrienne, and the game was forbidden". Typically, Napoleon recalled that when they graduated in 1787 at age 15 he led in all subjects; Bourrienne recalled that Napoleon led in mathematics, while he was first in all else.

=== Friendship renewed ===
Bonaparte continued his military studies and entered the army. Bourrienne prepared for a diplomatic career, studying in Vienna and then at Leipzig. Appointed Secretary of the Legation at Stuttgart he remained there during the first years of the French Revolution, flouting orders to return. He did not come home until the spring of 1792, so his name was on the list of emigrants, a potentially dangerous classification. Reunited with Bonaparte in Paris, they enjoyed bachelor life together, and among other incidents of that exciting time were horrified witnessing the rabble mobbing the royal family in the Tuileries (June 20) and the massacre of the Swiss Guards at the same spot (August 10). After that Bourrienne returned to his family home in Sens. Following the affair of 13 Vendémiaire (October 5, 1795) he moved back to Paris and again associated with Bonaparte, who was then second in command of the Army of the Interior and who soon left to command the Army of Italy. The spectacularly victorious general urgently summoned Bourrienne to Italy for the long negotiations with Austria (May–October 1797), where his knowledge of law and diplomacy was useful in drafting the terms of the Treaty of Campo Formio (October 7). Bourrienne recognized that his friend was likely to become a major historical figure, so he began making notes and filing copies of pertinent documents. In November 1797 his name was removed from the list of emigrants.

=== Private secretary and disgrace ===
The following year he accompanied Bonaparte to Egypt as his private secretary. Later Bourrienne strongly defended the controversial decisions at Jaffa to euthanize the French plague victims and to bayonet the Turkish prisoners who had violated parole. They returned together on the adventurous voyage to Fréjus (September–October 1799), and Bourrienne helped in the parleys that led up to a coup d'état. Then they worked on the Constitution of the Year VIII, which made Bonaparte First Consul for ten years. Almost every day he arrived at 7 AM to work side by side with Bonaparte, often going on to 10 PM. Bourrienne left to become head of the police, but soon was recalled because Bonaparte needed him. He remained in Paris during the second Italian campaign, after which he watched with admiration as his friend continued to organize France so that it would be governed effectively under clearly codified laws by the talented men he brought into the government. As Bonaparte progressed to become Consul for Life Bourrienne recorded—with a mix of admiration and apprehension—his skilled maneuvers to clench power and to enrich his family. In the autumn of 1802 Bonaparte started to ease him out, after a few uncertain weeks firing him without stating a cause. Most likely Bonaparte was revolted by his financial speculations. They never talked together again. Bourrienne was in disgrace.

=== The Hanseatic League ===
In the spring of 1805 he was appointed French consul to the free city of Hamburg, the leading city of the Hanseatic League. He was supposed to enforce the measures for the commercial war against England, known as the Continental System, but was convinced that cutting off trade hurt Europe more than Britain. His unanswered letters did not persuade the Emperor Napoleon to change his policy. In the early spring of 1807, when directed to provide a large number of military cloaks for the army in East Prussia, he procured them secretly and expeditiously from England. He was recalled to France in 1810 when, to his regret, the Hanseatic towns were incorporated into the Empire. He had made a fortune in Hamburg.

=== The restoration and the 100 days ===
In 1814 the victorious Allied Armies occupied Paris. Charles Maurice de Talleyrand-Périgord headed a provisional government in which Bourrienne was appointed head of the Post Office, which was also responsible for secretly transcribing suspects' letters. He participated in the meetings with the Tsar and other Allied leaders that led to the Bourbon restoration. The returning Louis XVIII received him warmly, nevertheless he promptly lost his position. When Napoleon escaped from Elba Bourrienne was appointed Prefect of Police. Napoleon issued an amnesty for all but thirteen individuals; one of them was Bourrienne. He spent the Hundred Days (1815) with Louis XVIII in Ghent. After that he did not play a notable part in public affairs. In 1830 he published his book and that revolution cost him his fortune. He died at Caen on February 7, 1834, after spending two years in an asylum.

== The Memoirs ==
His book gives a vivid, intimate, detailed account of his interactions with Napoleon and his mother, brothers and sisters; with his first wife Joséphine de Beauharnais and her children; with notable French politicians; and with the marshals, he was especially friendly with Jean Baptiste Jules Bernadotte, the future King of Sweden, when they both were in Northern Germany. His narrative is invigorated by many dialogues, not only of those in which he was a speaker but even of conversations that he only was told about by others. Their exactitude may be suspect but surely they give a memorable portrait of his times. Many judgments are supported by quotes from his stockpile of documents. Naturally his narration is colored by his complicated relationship with his subject: close friendship, working together intimately for years, followed by dismissal and humiliating rejection. He tries to be balanced and gives many examples of Napoleon's brilliance, his skill at governance, and his deft political maneuvers, while deploring his inexorable grabs for personal and familial power and wealth, his willingness to sacrifice French lives, and his abhorrence of a free press. Military campaigns are left for professional judges. One of his bombshells is the claim that the Grand Army based at Boulogne was never meant to invade England, too chancy an enterprise: it was a diversion to keep British forces at home.

Of course the book infuriated devoted Bonapartists; two volumes of criticisms were published promptly to attack his credibility. Controversy was still raging half a century later.

His book is not a source in which to check particular facts, but as Goethe wrote: "All of the nimbus, all of the illusions, with which journalists and historians have surrounded Napoleon, vanishes before the awe-inspiring realisms of this book…".
