= Labour Representation League =

The Labour Representation League (LRL), organised in November 1869, was a forerunner of the British Labour Party. Its original purpose was to register the working class to vote, and get workers into Parliament. It had limited power, described by Eugenio Biagini as being "very weak and quite ineffective", and was never intended to become a full political party. However, it played a role in supporting the election of Lib-Lab MPs. The first secretary was Cooperative Society activist and trade unionist, Lloyd Jones.

In 1873, the League provided the following address to its supporters:

We urge you to organize in your several constituencies, not as mere consenting parties to the doings of local wirepullers, but as a great Labour party – a party which knows its strength, and is prepared to fight and win.

In 1874, the League fielded twelve candidates and won two parliamentary seats.

In 1886, the TUC created the Labour Electoral Association to replace the League; in turn, this led to the creation of the Labour Party.

A volume containing the press cuttings, circulars and correspondence from 1873 to 1878 is archived at the London School of Economics library.

== Secretaries ==
- 1869: Lloyd Jones
- 1873: Henry Broadhurst
- 1880: John Hales
