= John Anderson (trade unionist) =

British trade union leader

John Anderson was a British trade union leader.

Anderson was a member of the Amalgamated Society of Engineers (ASE), and served for many years as its Manchester District Secretary. In 1883, he was elected as the third assistant secretary of the union.

In 1887, Anderson stood to become general secretary of the ASE. He took 9,100 votes, and was narrowly defeated by Robert Austin, who won 9,956 votes. Austin died in 1891, and Anderson stood in the election to replace him, proposing a relatively conservative platform of maintaining the union's positions. On this occasion, he narrowly won, with 18,102 votes to 17,152 for the socialist Tom Mann, and 738 for William Glennie.

Anderson took up the general secretaryship in April 1892. At the same time, the union agreed to a major reorganisation, including a full-time executive council and full-time regional officers; an orientation towards standing candidates in Parliamentary elections; the admission of apprentices into probationary membership; and the creation of a pension fund for members. Anderson personally was active in the Trades Union Congress (TUC), serving on its Parliamentary Committee for a year, and representing the TUC at the Zurich International Congress.

In 1895, George Nicoll Barnes, one of the ASE's assistant secretaries, resigned his post, arguing that the union was insufficiently militant, and that the executive council monopolised power. He challenged Anderson for the general secretaryship, and came close, Anderson winning by 12,910 votes to 11,603. However, the following year, Anderson was dismissed by the union executive on a charge of "wilful neglect of duty". He was permitted to stand for re-election, but could only take second place, 8,000 votes behind Barnes.

Trade union offices
Preceded by Robert Austin	General Secretary of the Amalgamated Society of Engineers; 1892–1896	Succeeded by George Nicoll Barnes
