= Amalgamated Society of Engineers =

1851–1920 trade union of the United Kingdom

- Merged into: Amalgamated Engineering Union
- Founded: 1851
- Dissolved: 1920
- Headquarters: 110 Peckham Road, London
- Location: United Kingdom
- Members: 300,000 (1979)
- Affiliations: TUC, IMF, Labour

The Amalgamated Society of Engineers (ASE) was a major British trade union, representing factory workers and mechanics.

== History ==
The history of the union can be traced back to the formation of the Journeymen Steam Engine, Machine Makers' and Millwrights' Friendly Society, in 1826, popularly known as the "Old Mechanics". Its secretary, William Allan, and another leading figure in the union, William Newton, proposed forming a new union to bring together skilled workers from all engineering trades. They invited a large number of other unions to become part a new Amalgamated Society of Engineers, Machinists, Smiths, Millwrights and Pattern-makers, which was soon shorted to the Amalgamated Society of Engineers (ASE). Other than the Old Mechanics, the only notable union to join was the Smiths Benevolent, Sick and Burial Society. Together with various small, local unions, they brought 5,000 members into the ASE on its creation in 1851, Allan becoming its first general secretary.

The ASE was one of the 'New Model Unions' of the 1850s–1870s. These unions, which also included the Ironfounders, Builders, and Carpenters' societies, rejected Chartism and the ideas of Robert Owen in favour of a more moderate policy based on 'prudence', 'respectability' and steady growth. Great importance was attached to the question of finance, as substantial funds would not only provide maintenance for members involved in strike action, but also help to deter the employers from attacking the organisation. Since its members were skilled and relatively highly paid, it was possible for the ASE to charge contributions of one shilling a week and to build up a fund of unprecedented proportions. Initially, there were strict restrictions on membership; all must have completed an apprenticeship in their trade, and men who wore glasses were not permitted to join.

The ASE was an immediate success, and within a year, membership had more than doubled to 11,000. However, in 1852, it agreed a ban on overtime and piecework. In retaliation, employers began an extended national lockouts, which greatly weakened the organisation, an event repeated in 1896. But it maintained its pre-eminent position in the industry, and many local and regional unions joined.

The union was invited to join the Federation of Engineering and Shipbuilding Trades (FEST) when it was formed in 1891, but refused to do so. It also had a turbulent relationship with the Trades Union Congress (TUC), not holding membership in 1905 or from 1907 to 1918. However, it was a founder member of the General Federation of Trade Unions (GFTU). It finally joined the FEST in 1905, hoping to persuade its other members to amalgamate with it. Six small unions did so, but the other refused, and the ASE again left the FEST in 1918.

The ASE set up overseas branches in the United States, Canada, Australia, New Zealand and South Africa. In 1891, they had only 5,000 members between them, but by 1920 they had grown to 32,000 members. The union set up an Australasian Council, and in 1906 a South African Council, and the branches in those countries thereafter had a considerable degree of autonomy. They had their own full-time secretaries and organisers, and became the leading unions for engineers in those countries. However, in North America, the union failed to grow. American Organiser Isaac Cowen prioritised strong links with the union in Britain, and the union there came to largely consist of British members who were temporarily working overseas. Many of them left in 1905 to join the Industrial Workers of the World, and the ASE decided in 1920 to transfer the remaining branches to the International Association of Machinists.

In 1920, the ASE put out a fresh call for other unions to merge with it. Seventeen unions balloted their members on a possible merger, and nine voted in favour of amalgamation. Together, they formed the Amalgamated Engineering Union.

== Election results ==
The ASE was an early affiliate of the Labour Party. It sponsored candidates in each election from 1906 on, with several of its candidates winning election.

Election	Constituency	Candidate	Votes	Percentage	Position
1906 general election	Barrow-in-Furness	Charles Duncan	5,167	48.3	1
1906 general election	Darlington	Isaac Mitchell	4,087	48.3	2
1906 general election	Glasgow Blackfriars and Hutchesontown	George Nicoll Barnes	3,284	39.5	1
1906 general election	Great Grimsby	Tom Proctor	2,248	17.8	3
1906 general election	Stockton-on-Tees	Frank Herbert Rose	1,710	23.1	3
1910 January general election	Barrow-in-Furness	Charles Duncan	5,304	55.2	1
1910 January general election	Birmingham East	Joseph James Stephenson	3,958	31.9	2
1910 January general election	Crewe	Frank Herbert Rose	1,380	09.5	3
1910 January general election	Govan	James Thomas Brownlie	3,545	23.3	3
1910 January general election	Glasgow Blackfriars and Hutchesontown	George Nicoll Barnes	4,496	61.7	1
1910 December general election	Barrow-in-Furness	Charles Duncan	4,810	52.9	1
1910 December general election	Glasgow Blackfriars and Hutchesontown	George Nicoll Barnes	4,162	59.1	1
1918 general election	Bristol North	James Kaylor	5,007	26.5	2
1918 general election	Chatham	Dan W. Hubbard	4,134	22.5	2
1918 general election	Crewe	James Thomas Brownlie	10,439	43.8	2
1918 general election	Dumbarton Burghs	David Kirkwood	10,566	47.4	2
1918 general election	Gateshead	John Brotherton	7,212	23.8	2
1918 general election	Gravesend	James Butts	3,254	21.5	2
1918 general election	Ilkeston	George Oliver	7,962	45.2	2
1918 general election	Islington West	John Thomas Sheppard	2,300	20.9	3
1918 general election	Kennington	William Glennie	2,817	25.4	3
1918 general election	Leeds North East	John Bromley	4,450	24.5	2
1918 general election	Leigh	Richard Owen Jones	11,146	46.4	2
1918 general election	Leith	Stanley Burgess	4,251	19.1	3
1918 general election	Lincoln	Robert Arthur Taylor	6,658	28.5	2
1918 general election	Newcastle upon Tyne West	David Adams	6,411	33.4	2
1918 general election	Newton	Robert Young	9,808	55.0	1
1918 general election	Nottingham East	Tom Proctor	2,817	19.4	2
1918 general election	Salford South	James Gorman	3,807	19.0	2
1918 general election	Sheffield Brightside	Richard Edward Jones	6,781	35.8	2
1918 general election	Shrewsbury	Arthur Taylor	5,542	36.1	2
1918 general election	Yeovil	William Kelly	7,589	36.4	2

== Leadership ==
=== General Secretaries ===
1851: William Allan
1875: John Burnett
1886: Robert Austin
1891: John Anderson
1896: George Nicoll Barnes
1909: Jenkin Jones
1912: Robert Young
1919: Tom Mann

=== Chairmen ===
1893: Alfred Sellicks
1903: Alfred Golightly
1903: David Gardner
1910: Albert Taylor
1913: James Thomas Brownlie

== See also ==
- Embargo strike
