= Robert Applegarth =

English trade unionist (1834–1924)

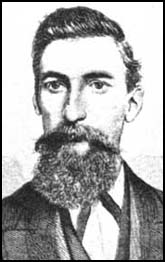
Robert Applegarth

Robert Applegarth (26 January 1834 – 13 July 1924) was a prominent British trade unionist and proponent of working class causes.

== Biography ==
Robert Applegarth was born in Hull in England. His father was the captain of a whaling brig. He spent a brief period in a dame school but had no other formal education and began work in a shoemaker's shop aged ten. He learned the skills of carpentry, before moving to Sheffield where he met and married Mary Longmore, a farmer's daughter.

Applegarth moved to New York City in December 1854, seeking well paid employment, with only a half crown in his possession. He lived with another immigrant from Sheffield for a time, and held a variety of jobs including a master at a railroad station. He admired the democracy of the United States, but was appalled by slavery, and visited Mississippi to witness it for himself, where he met Frederick Douglass. By 1857, Applegarth was confident that he could support his wife in America so sent for her from Sheffield, but she was too ill to travel and so he returned to Sheffield. During the American Civil War, Applegarth strongly supported the Union.

Once back in the United Kingdom he joined the Sheffield Carpenters Union, and rose to become their secretary. In 1861 the Sheffield Carpenters Union merged with the Amalgamated Society of Carpenters and Joiners (ASCJ), and in 1862 was elected as general secretary of the union. The ASCJ was a New Model Union, and Applegarth regularly met with other leading New Model Unionists in London, in what Sidney and Beatrice Webb termed a junta.

Applegarth also became an executive member of the London Trades Council (LTC), and advocated a moderate approach to trade unionism with an emphasis on negotiations rather than strike action, telling his fellow trade unionists to "Never surrender the right to strike, but be careful how you use a double-edged weapon". This stance led to conflict with George Potter, the founder of the LTC's journal The Bee-Hive, who argued that the journal should give its support unreservedly to all strike action undertaken by trade unions throughout the country. Applegarth accused him of being a "manufacturer of strikes" and of personal dishonesty and maladministration following an investigation into the Bee-Hive in 1865. As a result, Potter was forced to leave the LTC.

Under Applegarth's leadership, the ASCJ's membership increased from 1000 in 1862 to over 10,000 in 1870, and accumulated funds of over £17,000. During the Royal Commission on Trade Unions (1867), Applegarth vigorously advocated the benefits of New Model Unionism to the committee, answering a total of 633 questions, and was generally regarded as the most impressive pro-trade union witness. Applegarth campaigned for the pro-trade unionist minority report of the commission to be accepted by Gladstone's Liberal government, leading to the Trade Union Act of 1871. In May of the same year he was offered a position on the Royal Commission on Contagious Diseases, which he took despite the protests of the ASCJ, leading him to resign from his position as general secretary. At around this time he joined the Working Men's Committee for Promoting the Separation of Church and State along with Potter and George Howell.

After his work for the Royal Commission, Applegarth became a commercial traveller for a French firm selling Henry Fleuss's underwater breathing apparatus. He took out the English patent for the Yablochkov candle and made a fairly successful business out of it based in Epsom. When his old friend Howell lost his seat in Parliament in 1895 and fell ill, Applegarth and the TUC raised a £1650 testimonial to buy him an annuity. In 1898 he became a poultry farmer in Bexley, where he introduced a new breed of French hen.

Applegarth spent his retirement in Brighton, where he was offered the title of Companion of Honour by Lloyd George in 1917. He turned the offer down, saying he preferred to remain "plain Robert Applegarth". When he died in 1924 he was cremated at West Norwood Cemetery and given a secular ceremony, according to his instructions.

Trade union offices
Preceded by J. Lea	General Secretary of the Amalgamated Society of Carpenters and Joiners; 1862 - 71	Succeeded by John D. Prior
