= Amalgamated Marine Workers' Union =

Former trade union of the United Kingdom

- Amalgamated Marine Workers' Union
- Founded: 1922
- Dissolved: 1927
- Headquarters: 41 Gower Street, London
- Location: United Kingdom
- Members: 12,000 (1922)
- Key people: Joe Cotter (General Secretary); Manny Shinwell (National Organiser).
- Affiliations: TUC

The Amalgamated Marine Workers' Union (AMWU) was a trade union of sailors, firemen and ship-board service personnel which existed in the United Kingdom between 1922 and 1927.

It was a merger of the British Seafarers' Union and the National Union of Ship's Stewards, both of which were opposed to the principal trade union in the shipping industry, the National Sailors' and Firemen's Union.

At the outset, the AMWU expressed an ambition to replace the NSFU and ultimately to become part of the recently established Transport and General Workers Union. But several factors limited the union's effectiveness. It faced resistance from both the NSFU and the Shipping Federation, which collaborated through the National Maritime Board to control access to employment in the shipping industry. The AMWU also suffered from severe internal divisions.

In 1923 and 1925, the AMWU once again found itself unsuccessfully resisting wage reductions. In the latter instance, its effectiveness was limited by the refusal of its general secretary (Joe Cotter) to sign cheques, and the consequent impossibility of accessing union funds. The union also lost ground at this time to the Seamen's Section of the National Minority Movement (formed 1924), which attracted many of those seafarers who were most determined to resist the reductions. The Minority Movement, which was sponsored by the Communist Party and included black activist seafarers in this xenophobic period, was suspicious of the AMWU. Such activists regarded the AMWU as a sectional organisation.

In 1926, a former member of the National Union of Ship's Stewards launched a legal challenge to the union's status, alleging that the ballot which brought about the merger of the two organisations had not been properly conducted. The AMWU lost this challenge and, as a result, was unable to access its funds. Despite the efforts of its National Organiser, Manny Shinwell, the AMWU was wound up in early 1927.
