= Jim Scott (trade unionist) =

Scottish trade unionist

James Scott (1900 – 21 January 1962) was a Scottish trade unionist.

Scott was born in West Lothian. When he was fifteen years old, he joined the Royal Navy, serving during World War I. In 1919, he moved to work in the Merchant Navy, in ships' engine rooms. He remained in this post until 1934, when he was appointed as the National Union of Seamen's (NUS) full-time delegate in Glasgow.

Scott continued his career with the NUS when, in 1940, he was appointed as a branch secretary in Grangemouth. Four years later, he became the union's representative in Mumbai, soon moving on to similar posts in Canada and the United States. He returned to the UK in 1947, when he became a special organiser for Merseyside, then London District Secretary in 1948 and Mersey District Secretary in 1950. He was promoted to become National Organiser in 1955, and then elected as the union's treasurer and an assistant general secretary in 1959. While in the post, he ended a major unofficial strike, organised by the National Seamen's Reform Movement, by persuading North American maritime unions to stop funding the movement. He subsequently organised the expulsion of two NUS members, who he claimed were leaders of the movement.

In 1960, Scott was elected as General Secretary of the NUS, beating William Sinclair, George Lipman and Thomas Sutton, and taking up the post at the start of the following year. Alongside leading the union, he was elected to serve on the General Council of the Trades Union Congress, the National Maritime Board, the Merchant Navy Welfare Board, the council of Ruskin College, and the executive of the International Transport Workers' Federation.

As leader of the NUS, Scott began planning a reorganisation of the union, with the aim of reducing dissatisfaction among members about their lack of input into the union and its close co-operation with employers. However, he became ill, and Lipman had to take over his duties. Scott died early in 1962, just over a year after taking office.

Trade union offices
Preceded by Tom Yates	General Secretary of the National Union of Seamen; 1961–1962	Succeeded by Bill Hogarth
