= National Union of Seamen =

Former trade union of the United Kingdom

- Merged into: National Union of Rail, Maritime and Transport Workers
- Founded: 1887
- Dissolved: 1990
- Headquarters: Maritime House, Old Town, Clapham
- Location: United Kingdom
- Members: 65,000 (1889); 45,654 (1980)
- Key people: Havelock Wilson, Manny Shinwell, Samuel Plimsoll, Tom Mann, John Prescott
- Affiliations: TUC, Labour, NMB, BSJC, ITF

The National Union of Seamen (NUS) was the principal trade union of merchant seafarers in the United Kingdom from the late 1880s to 1990. In 1990, the union amalgamated with the National Union of Railwaymen to form the National Union of Rail, Maritime and Transport Workers (RMT).

== National Amalgamated Sailors' and Firemen's Union (1887–1893) ==
Havelock Wilson

The Seamen's Union was founded in Sunderland in 1887 as the National Amalgamated Sailors' and Firemen's Union. Its founder, J. Havelock Wilson became its president. It quickly spread to other ports and had become genuinely national by the end of 1888.

In 1888 and 1889 the union fought a number of successful strikes in Glasgow, Seaham, Liverpool and other major ports. By 1889, it had 45 branches and a nominal membership of 80,000. But from 1890, it began to face determined resistance from shipowners, who formed an association, the Shipping Federation, to co-ordinate their strike-breaking and anti-union activity. The union fought and lost defensive actions in Hull, Bristol, Cardiff and other important centres in 1891–1893. These episodes depleted its funds and led to a large fall in membership. The union also became involved in a large number of expensive legal cases. Although partly due to the actions of shipowners, the difficulties experienced by the union in this period have also been attributed to its officials' taste for litigation and their inadequate handling of union finances. In 1893, the NASFU went into voluntary liquidation to avoid bankruptcy.

== National Sailors' and Firemen's Union (1894–1926) ==
Relaunched in 1894 as the National Sailors' and Firemen's Union (NSFU), having dropped the word "Amalgamated", the union continued to experience financial difficulties and low membership. From the summer of 1910 the union worked to promote a national seamen's strike to combat the Shipping Federation. This finally took place in the summer of 1911. The union's control over the movement was incomplete. In many ports rank and file strike committees and activists played a more important organisational role than the union itself, and the union's long-standing programme was over-shadowed by demands for wage increases. Nonetheless, the strike greatly increased both the funds and the membership of the union, allowing it to emerge once again as a significant force. Following the strike-wave, the union gained official recognition from many shipowners.

In 1911/1912 the growth of the NSFU was checked by a breakaway movement in Southampton and Glasgow which led to the formation of the rival British Seafarers' Union. At a national level, however, the NSFU was able to maintain and increase its supremacy.

Contemporaries often regarded the NSFU as a militant organisation because of the strikes in which it had involved itself in the late 1880s and in 1911. Yet from its inception the union expressed a belief in the possibility of industrial harmony, and announced itself in favour of establishing conciliation procedures. The leadership of the union was not greatly influenced by 'socialism'. Its founder and president, J. Havelock Wilson, served several terms as a Liberal Party MP, and the union itself did not affiliate to the Labour Party until 1919. Indeed, at the 1918 general election, it sponsored three candidates:

Constituency	Candidate	Votes	Percentage	Position
Bootle	Edmund Cathery	7,235	37.0	2
Kingston upon Hull South West	John R. Bell	5,005	30.9	2
South Shields	Havelock Wilson	19,514	75.2	1

Wilson was primarily sponsored by the Liberal Party, while Bell described himself as a Coalition Labour candidate. Cathery ran in the name of the union.

== World War I ==
After the outbreak of World War I, the union began collaborating closely with the Admiralty and shipowners in support of the war effort. From 1916, Havelock Wilson emerged as one of the most vehement supporters of the war in the labour movement, ostensibly because of Germany's conduct of the war at sea, especially the alleged targeting of non-combatant vessels. In 1917 the Union provoked controversy by refusing to convey Arthur Henderson and Ramsay MacDonald to a conference of socialist parties in Stockholm, which had been convened in the wake of the Russian Revolution to discuss the possibility of a peace policy.

A further development in 1917 was the formation of the National Maritime Board as a governing body for the merchant marine. The union's involvement in it allowed it to negotiate directly with shipowners over wages and conditions.

== Interwar period ==
In 1922, the arrangements were extended by the establishment of the "PC5 system", which was intended to allow the Shipping Federation and the union to exercise joint control over access to employment in the shipping industry.

In 1921, the National Maritime Board imposed wage reductions, which were supported by the NSFU. The acceptance of cuts in pay provoked considerable resistance from ordinary seafarers and from the rival organisations: the British Seafarers' Union and the National Union of Ship's Stewards. Other sections of the trade union and labour movement were also strongly critical of the NSFU's detrimental collusion with employers. That was especially the National Transport Workers' Federation, which helped to merge the rival organisations referred to above into a new organisation, the Amalgamated Marine Workers' Union, intended as a viable alternative to the NSFU. Further wage reductions were made in 1923, and 1925, which again outraged members.

Militant resistance to the NSFU was expressed through the Seamen's Minority Movement (founded 1924) part of the Transport Workers' Minority Movement. Criticism of the NSFU became increasingly widespread with its apparent role in the 1925 Special Restriction (Coloured Alien Seamen) Order, which is seen as the first path-breaking attempt to expel non-British-born people; its failure to observe the general strike in 1926; and its support of a "non-political" Miners' Union in Nottinghamshire. During the 1926 general strike, the union declined to join and worked to break the strike. In September 1928, the Union was officially expelled from the Trades Union Congress. However, after the death of Havelock Wilson in 1929, the NUS quickly began to pursue a more mainstream policy and became reconciled with the rest of the trade union movement. It adopted the title 'National Union of Seamen' in 1926. The term failed to recognise that women were also members; some seawomen had earlier organized in an unsuccessful Guild of Stewardesses.

By 1932, the Seamen's Minority Movement was 1,000-strong (less than a hundredth of the maritime workforce). Attempts were made among SMM black activists to combat the notorious postwar racism. Race riots had occurred in seaports such as South Shields, Liverpool and Cardiff. Also, the union itself felt a duty to support its white British-born members first during times of high unemployment. Key SMM figures in the 1920s and 1930s included Barbados-born, London-based Chris Braithwaite (Chris Jones). His connections with many antiracist initiatives including the Colonial Seamen's Organisation and the Pan-African Movement widened the SMM's links and brought international attention to the NUS's failure to back the largest black and minority ethnic workforce in Britain.

== Postwar growth of dissent ==
The NUS's almost-closed shop made the union stronger. After the Second World War there were widespread calls for reform of the NUS. Many members felt that the union was too closely associated with the employers and that it had failed to defend its members' interests. Rank and File Committees, building on the earlier Minority Movement, were established in many ports, and unofficial strikes took place in 1947, 1955 and 1960. A National Seamen's Reform Movement was established in the latter year.

A degree of reform was conceded in 1962, with the decision to allow a system of workplace representation by shop stewards. That belatedly brought the NUS into line with the general practices of the trade union movement. More importantly, it brought greater connection to the union. Seafarers could be away from home for months or years and so "a union man" on board, not far off in the Clapham headquarters, enhanced solidarity.

=== Strikes ===
On 16 May 1966, the NUS launched its first national strike since 1911. The strike aimed to secure higher wages and to reduce the working week from 56 to 40 hours. It was widely supported by union members and caused great disruption to shipping, especially in London, Liverpool and Southampton.

The political importance of the strike was enormous: the disruption of trade had an adverse effect on the United Kingdom's (precarious) balance of payments, provoked a run on the pound and threatened to undermine the government's attempts to keep wage increases below 3.5%. The Labour Prime Minister, Harold Wilson, was strongly critical of the strike, alleging that it had been taken over by Communists to bring down his administration. On 23 May, a week after the outbreak of the strike, the Government declared a state of emergency, but emergency powers were not used. The strike finally came to an end on 1 July.

=== Election results ===
The NUS re-affiliated to the Labour Party in 1931, and sponsored unsuccessful candidates at several general elections; generally in safe Conservative seats, hoping to later sponsor a candidate in a winnable constituency. By 1960, it enjoyed a close relationship with the party and, unusually, every one of its local branches was affiliated to its Constituency Labour Party. In 1970, it finally secured its first sponsored Member of Parliament, John Prescott, who became a prominent national figure.

Election	Constituency	Candidate	Votes	Percentage	Position
1935 general election	Birmingham Yardley	Charles Jarman	18,879	42.3	2
1950 general election	Portsmouth Langstone	Percy Knight	17,691	35.4	2
1959 general election	Liverpool West Derby	Aubrey Paxton	19,386	46.0	2
1966 general election	Southport	John Prescott	12,798	29.2	2
1970 general election	Kingston upon Hull East	John Prescott	36,859	71.4	1
1974 Feb general election	Kingston upon Hull East	John Prescott	41,300	70.0	1
1974 Feb general election	New Forest	Malcolm Bailey	12,737	20.4	3
1974 Oct general election	Kingston upon Hull East	John Prescott	34,190	62.4	1
1979 general election	Kingston upon Hull East	John Prescott	39,411	62.5	1
1983 general election	Kingston upon Hull East	John Prescott	23,615	49.9	1
1987 general election	Kingston upon Hull East	John Prescott	27,287	56.3	1

== Leadership ==
=== General Secretaries ===
1887: Havelock Wilson
1894: Edmund Cathery
1926: William J. Davies
1927: Edmund Cathery
1928: William Robert Spence
1942: Charles Jarman
1948: Tom Yates
1961: Jim Scott
1962: Bill Hogarth
1974: Jim Slater
1986: Sam McCluskie

=== Assistant General Secretaries and Treasurers ===
1926: George Gunning
1937: George Reed
1943: Tom Yates
1948: Stanley James
1959: Jim Scott
1960: George Lipman
1967: Ted Brown
1980: Sam McCluskie
1986:

=== Presidents ===
1887: Samuel Plimsoll
1894: Havelock Wilson
1929: Post abolished
1986: Jim Slater

=== Other prominent officials ===
Prominent figures who have held positions in the NUS include:

- Joe Cotter
- Tom Mann
- Manny Shinwell

== See also ==
- Eastcote, Northamptonshire
