= Richard Phelps Gough =

Welsh seaman

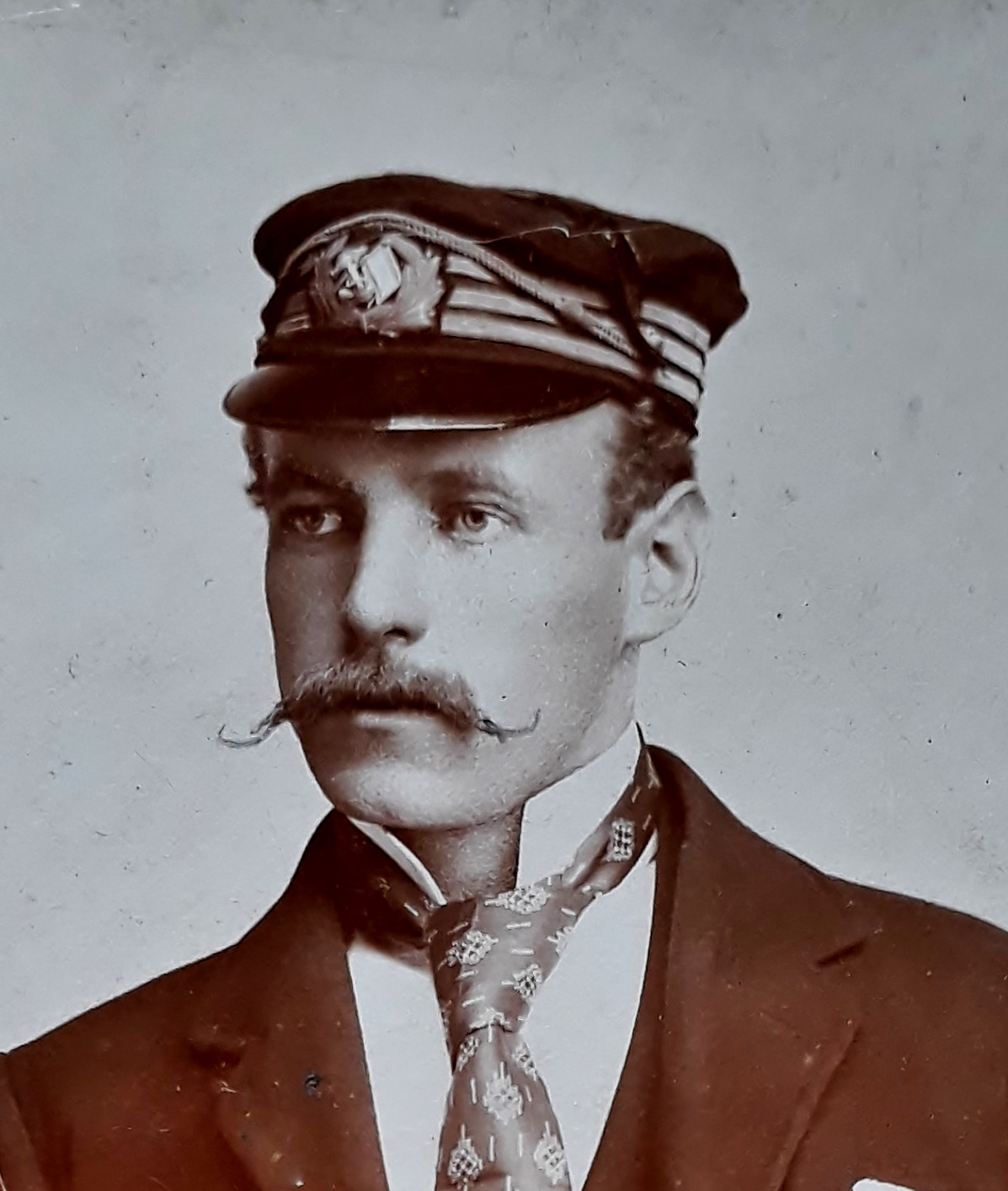
Young Captain Richard Phelps Gough at the end of the 19th century Born: 27 February 1869 Swansea Died: 12 October 1930 Swansea Nationality: British-Welsh Occupation: Navigator-Merchant navy Certificate of Competency: Master of a Foreign-Going Ship (1896) Title: Captain, Master Mariner and Sea Pilot Spouse: Harriot Winifred Bright Children: Four Highlights: Run away to sea at 14, has a record of 10 voyages round Cape Horn before 1903 in the Merchant Navy, participated to WWI and was awarded with the Mercantile & British War Medal

Captain Richard Phelps Gough (27 February 1869 – 12 October 1930) was a Welsh seaman for 50 years, born in Swansea, son of William (H.M Swansea prison engineer) and Mary Ann Gough. He married Harriot Winifred Bright, daughter of late Samuel and Bridget Bright from Victoria Terrace, on 15 October 1908 at Rhyddings English Calvinist Methodist Chapel in Swansea. The Gough family lived in Swansea, on Beechwood Road and later on Bonville Terrace. Horace Nichol Gough (marine engineer) and George Gough (Headmaster at Rutland-Street School) were two of his brothers.

Gough, a sea captain, master mariner and later on a Swansea Sea Pilot (1904-1930), came from "one of the oldest families in Swansea" and was in the nineteen twenties one of the most prominent seamen of south Wales. He was also a very sociable man, freemason and accustomed to talking in public, as he hand-wrote in a note book, some of his speeches and stories ready to be delivered such as "the Bachelors' farewell" or "the wreck of the Cyprian".

== Early years and career at sea (1883-1904) ==
His story of how he ran away to sea aged 14, had a W. W. Jacobs flavor and was greatly enjoyed by many. The story of this adventurous "Swansea Boy" says that one evening when 14 (in 1883), he was sent to fetch bread for the home, got in stealthily into the house, donned a bowler hat to look as old as he could (although he also wore an Eton collar!) and stowed away in one of T.P Richards' barquetines; the Wenona. He was discovered too late for the ship to go back, only when the ship was off "Worms Head" (Island in Front of Rhossili). He got away all right and the ship sailed round Cape Horn, and from that point, the association with the copper ore trade lasted several years.

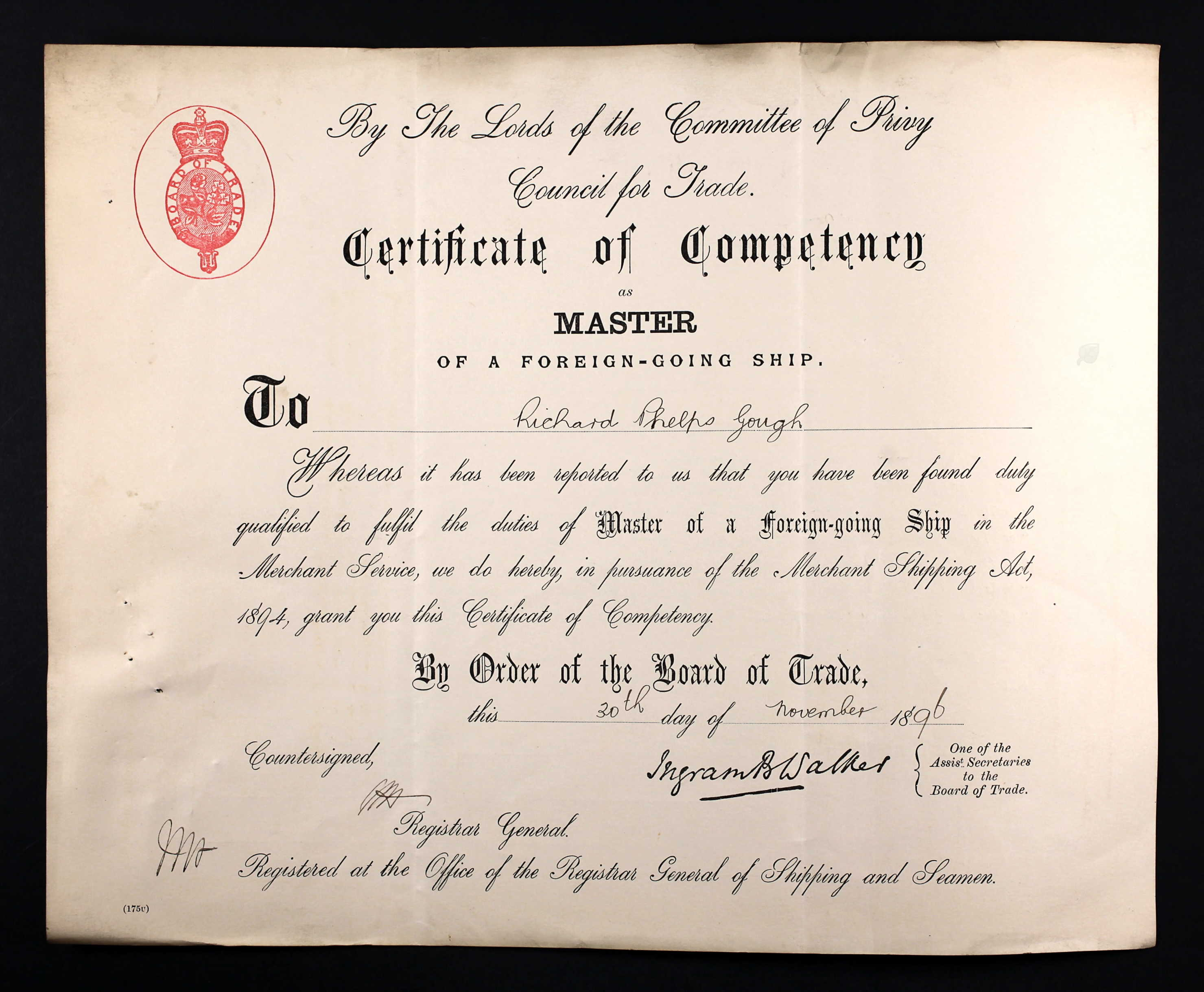
Gough Certificate of competency as Master of a foreign-going ship

He was later apprentice(4 years indenture from 1884 to 1888) notably in the Richardsons' cape horner Ravenscrag, got his mate's and masters' certificates (1890, 1892 and 1896) and served in numerous ships including the Kildonan, Lord Eslington, Taunton, Illimani, Serena, Candahar, Brunetti, Sumbawa, Matteawan, Savernake, Menemisha, Glenbreck, S.Y Eothen Rys. His first steamer was the Charles Hill's Bristol City line, Sir Walter O.N 79147 on which he served as a Master (in 1904). His career at sea spanned almost half a century.

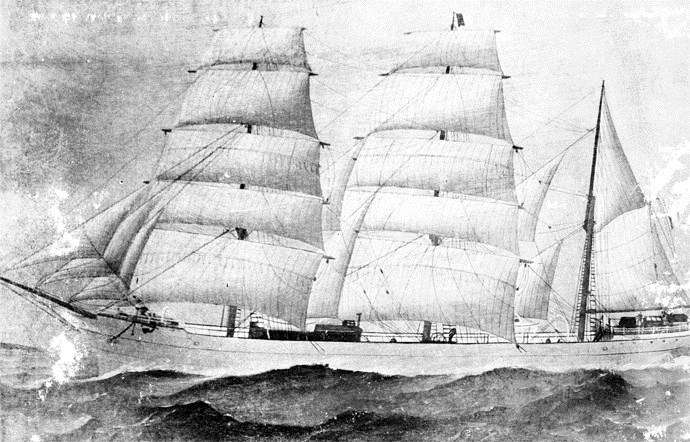
The Ship Sumbawa: R P Gough as acting Master for the first time in the Merchant Navy, at the age of 24 (1893)

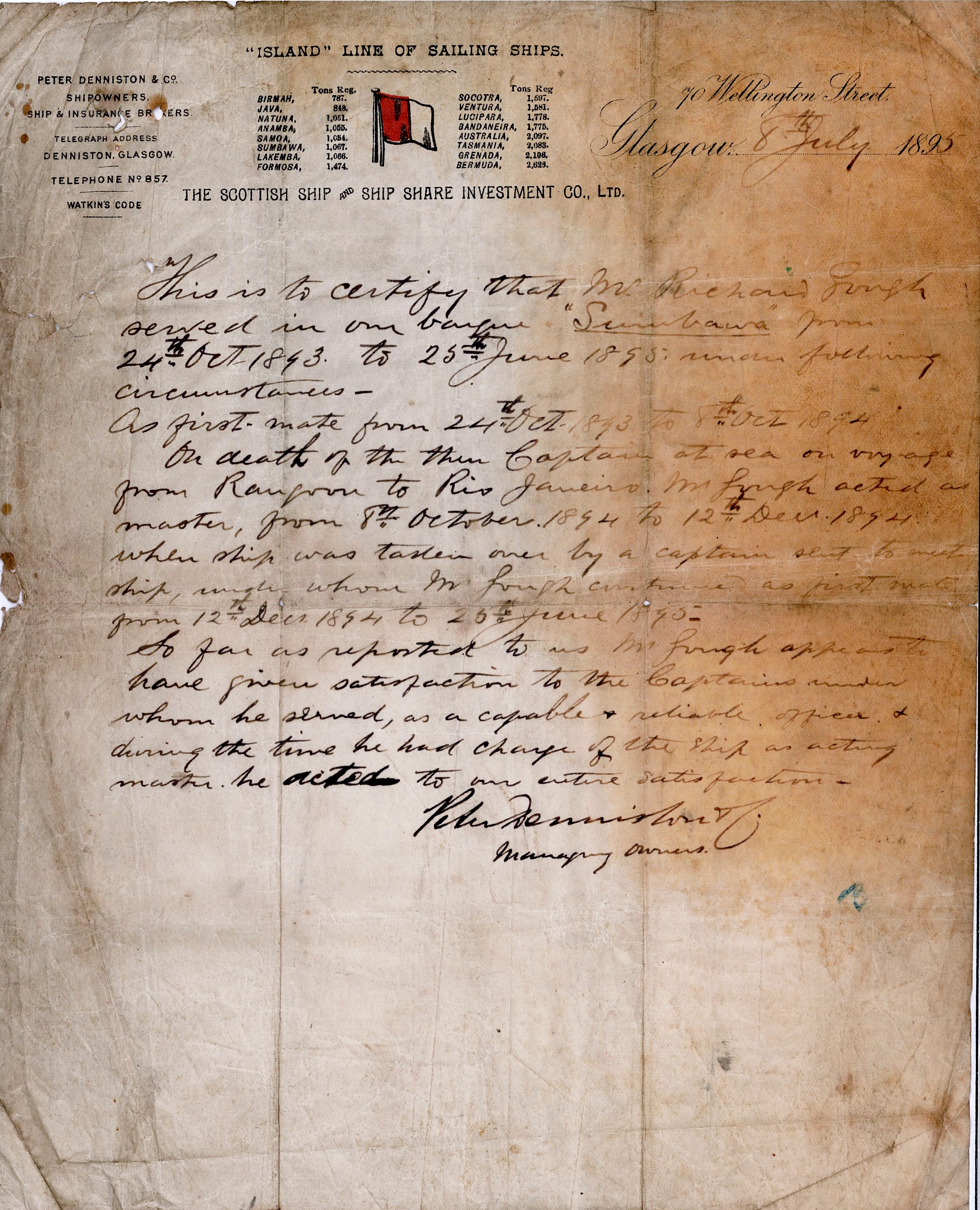
Letter "Island Line Sailing Ship": Gough acting Master for the first time, in 1893 aged 24

It was reported on 8 July 1895 by Peter Denniston managing owner of the Scottish Ship Co (Island Line Sailing ships), that he was in charge of a ship (The Sumbawa) for the first time in the merchant Navy, as acting Master in 1893 at the age of 24 years old (rounding Cape of Good Hope) on death of Captain at sea between Rangoon and Rio Janeiro. It was also stated by the Ship owner that "Richard P Gough was a capable and reliable officer and that during the time he had in charge of the ship as acting Master, he acted to our entire satisfaction".

== Swansea Master Pilot (1904-1930) ==
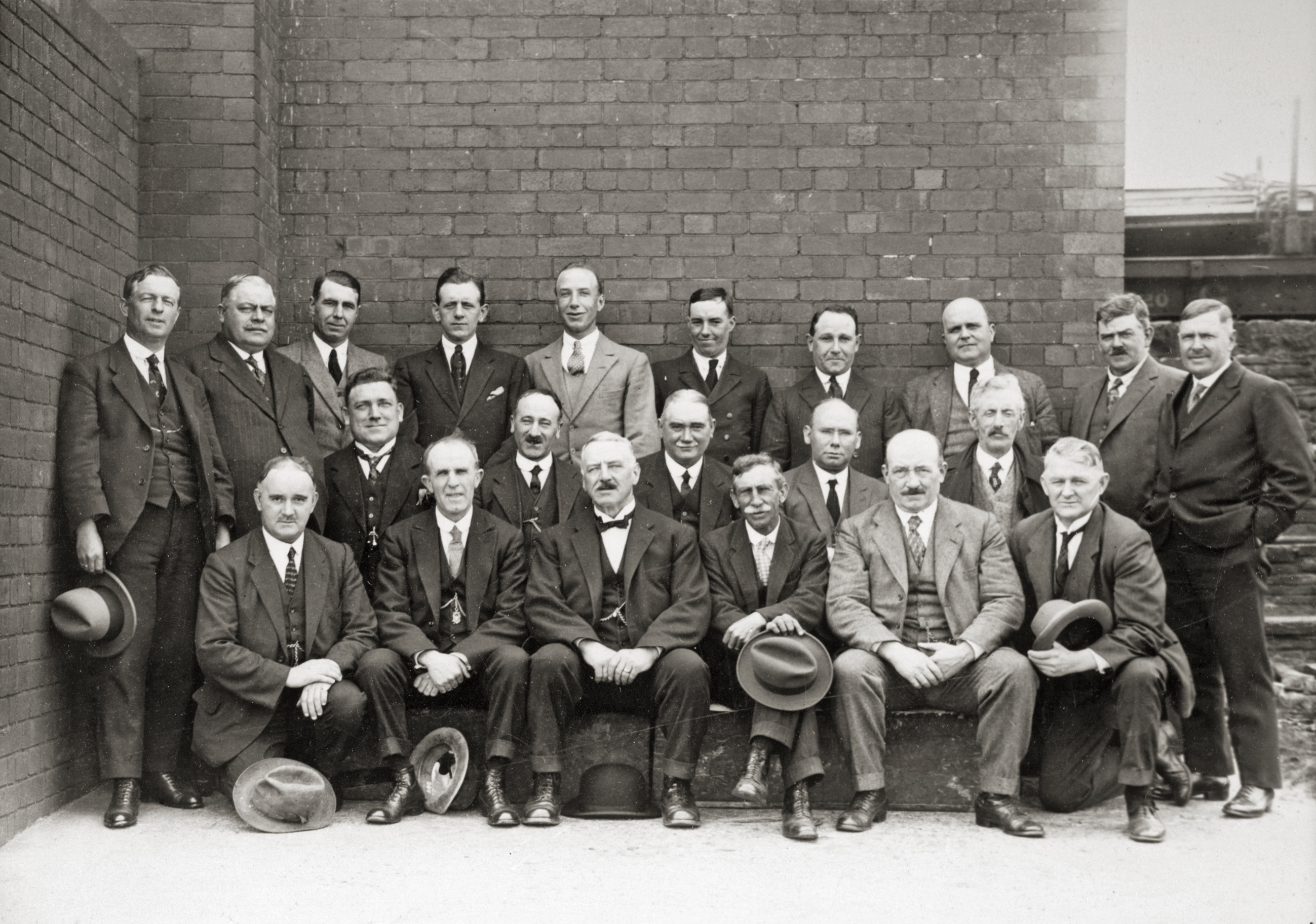
The Swansea Sea Pilots in 1925 from left to right: Standing: Thomas, Wright, Harris, Byrne, Cleeves, Hanson, Sidney, Jones, Chapman, Bevan Middle: Phillips, Mitchell, Hanson, Rice, Front row: Screech, Evans, Gough, Watking, Davies, Clement

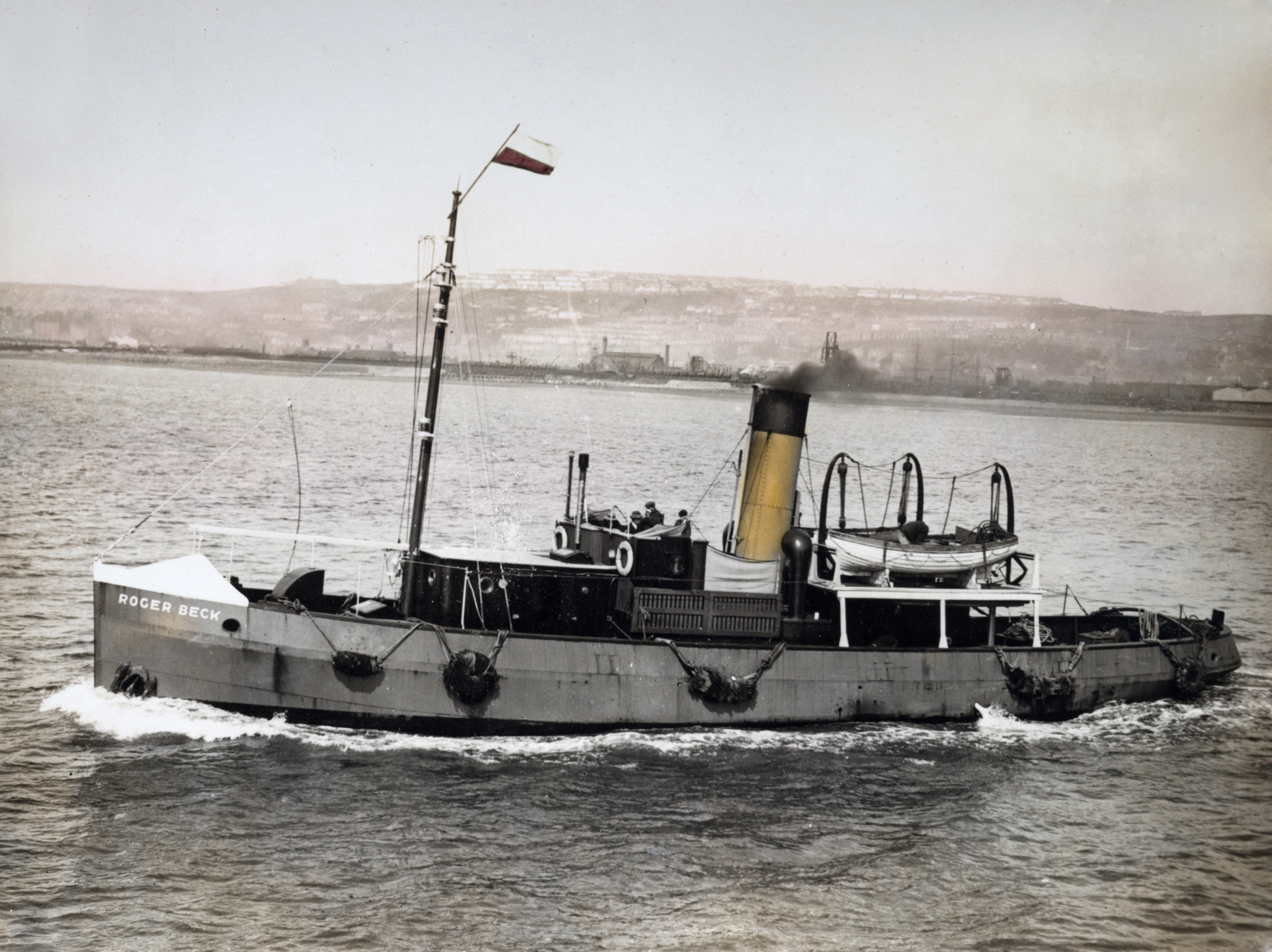
Swansea Pilot Cutter "Roger Beck" 1925–1960, property of Gough & other Pilots: built in accordance to many years experience, to maintain efficient pilotage service in conformity to the growing demand of Swansea Harbor. Served well until broken up at Connah's Quay in 1960

After an intense career in the Merchant Navy which lasted more than 20 years and led him all around the world with notably 10 voyages round Cape Horn, Gough became a Swansea Sea Pilot, operating in the Bristol Channel which is one of the most dangerous shipping lanes in the world. He stayed in function as a sea pilot for 27 years, first under the Old Harbor Trust and later under the Pilotage authority, and rendered very good service (Pilotage License granted 14 March 1904 and renewed every year).

He first served as a Master Pilot on the Pilot Cutter "Beaufort"(first steam pilot cutter to be built in the world for the purpose of laying alongside vessels at sea to embark and disembark pilots) from 1904 to 1924 and then he served from 1 January 1925, on the cutter "Roger Beck" (named by the Pilots after Harbour Trustee & Swansea greatest citizen at the time, died in 1923) until his death in 1930. He co-owned the "Roger Beck" as it was built by Messrs Palmers Ltd Tyne (Amble Shipbuilding Co) to the order of the Pilots constituting the Swansea Pilot Boat Co (property of the Pilots). The new cutter ordered by the Pilots was an improvement of the Beaufort and was built in accordance to many years experience, being oil driven and capable of developing a speed of 10 knots.

Gough was a member of the United Kingdom Pilots' Association which protected the pilots' interests. Amongst its members, he was very active to defend the Pilot's interests and on 15 August 1908, they met at the Albert Hall, Winston Churchill (President of the Board of Trade) who was in town, at the time, to meet the miners. The concern was the Tonnage Bill question cropping up and Churchill told them that "the Pilot's position was having his earnest consideration". His reception was said to be most cordial throughout.

== During World War I ==
He also took part in WWI, navigated in war zones and was awarded with the Mercantile Marine War Medal and the British War Medal both issued on 15 July 1921(unfortunately medals lost). With the Swansea Pilots, he organized during the war the delivery of useful goods to the 6th Welsh Regiment serving in France in November 1914. He also participated during the war years, as a representative of the Swansea Sea Pilots, to generous subscriptions towards the fund for providing Christmas Day gifts to the widows and children of Swansea soldiers who fell at the front.

== Freemason and Record round Cape Horn ==
Gough was a freemason, member of the Carradoc lodge (n°1573), the Talbot Chapter lodge (n°1323) and the Beaufort lodge (n°3834). In June 1925 (16th, 17th & 18th), for the United Kingdom Pilot's conference held in Swansea by the United Kingdom Pilot's Association, as Captain Harris, Captain William John Davies Welsh trade union leader and Captain Gough were chiefly responsible for the arrangements for entertaining the delegates, as members of the Reception Committee, The South Wales Daily Post mentions "Captains' Gough excellent record of 10 voyages round Cape Horn on great sailing ships known as cape honers".

== Associated with the worldwide Copper ore trade in Swansea (1883-1904) ==
Gough was a Swansea Cape Horner who sailed intensively around the world in sailing ships known as Copper Barques from 1883 to 1904, at a time when Swansea was the world center for Copper Production known as "Copperopolis" (manufacturing almost 70% of the world's copper goods) until 1923 when Copper-smelting ceased entirely in Swansea.

In the 19th century, Copper ore was shipped to Swansea (one of the busiest ports in the world), to be smelted and turned into pure copper ingots (because Swansea had much coal needed for this industry). The copper barques on which Gough embarked, were then sailing to Chile, North America, Cuba, South Africa and even Australia to load with Copper ore. The Barques were also leaving Swansea loaded with Coal, fire bricks, slate, steam engine parts, copper ingots, tinplate, other materials and even passengers. "Coal out and ore in" that's how Joseph Conrad described the copper ore trade between Swansea and the Chilean coast in "The Mirror of the Sea" published in 1906, "deep-loaded on both ways"

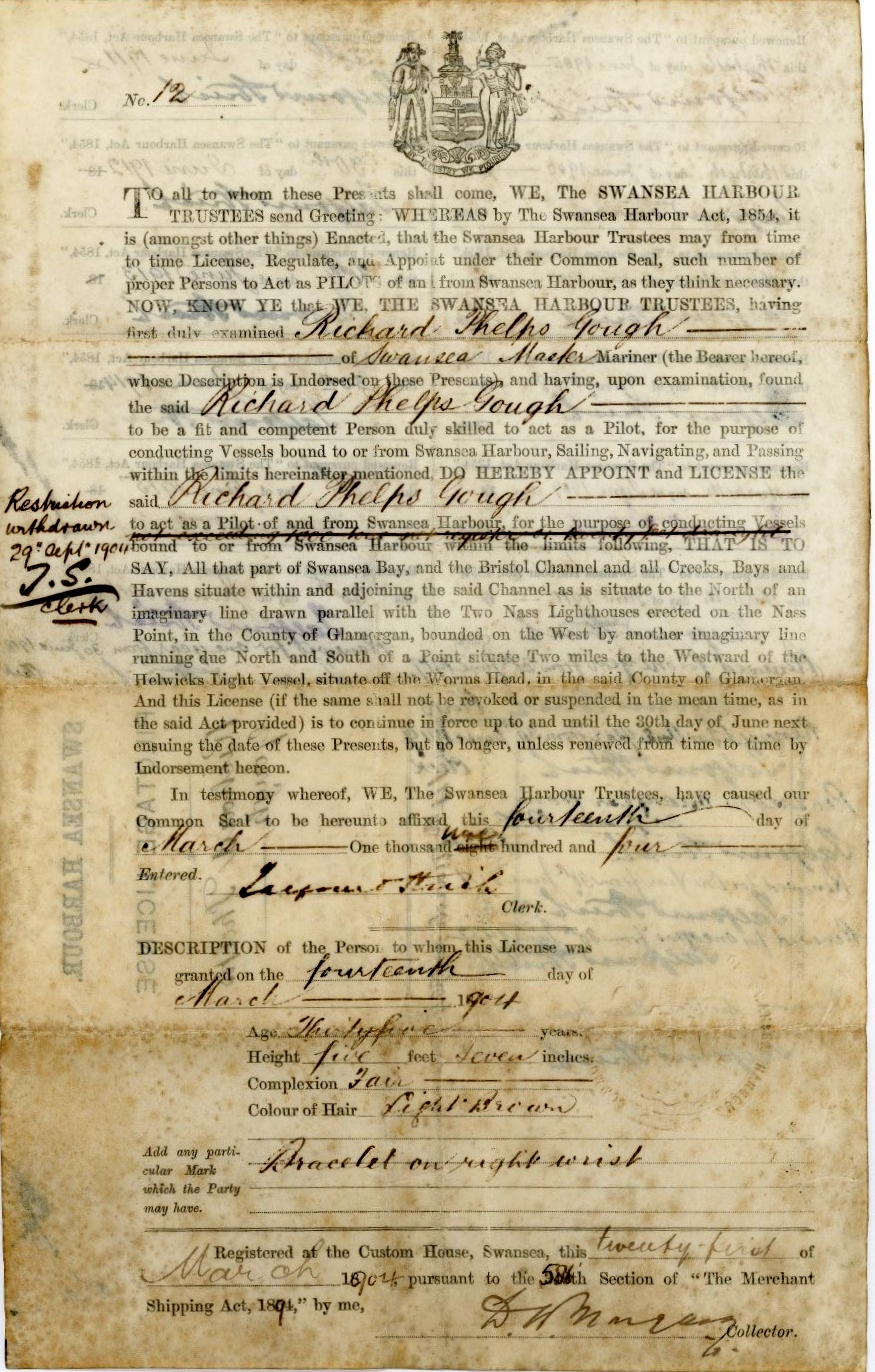
Gough's Pilotage License 1904

Few ports had more Cape Horners than Swansea in those days and they were revered. Gough like all the other Cape horners, had to cover immense distances and a voyage from Swansea to Chile and back again could take a year or more (7000 to 8000 miles). These voyages were at high risks and crews had to contend with terrifying conditions and illnesses: violent winds and currents, frost, breakers and raging seas, snow, icebergs round Cap Horn, diseases such as yellow fever, poor food, being washed away and drown, fires due to coal damp storage conditions, shipwreck, and many men would not survive. Many of them are buried in Santiago (Chile) which became known as the "Swansea Graveland".

== Death ==
Gough was 61 years old when he died. Described by the Press as a "well known and popular Swansea Sea Pilot", his funeral took place at Bethel Chapel, Sketty in Swansea on 15 October 1930. "Many prominent men had attended at the funeral". He left three sons (Hubert, Glyn, John) who all went to sea following in their father's footsteps and a daughter (Gwyneth). His wife, Harriott Winifred Bright, died earlier in 1924. Gough was remembered long after his death in an 17 October 1990 press article referring to him in these terms "60 years ago one of Swansea's best loved seamen died after a long illness, after a career on sea which spanned more than half a century".
