= Edmund Cathery =

British trade unionist

Edmund Cathery (15 May 1852 – 14 November 1929) was a British trade unionist.

== Early life ==
Born in Portsmouth, Cathery first went to sea at the age of eleven, and was soon working on Syria for P&O. He became active in the North of England Sailors' and Firemen's Friendly Society, and was a leading supporter of Havelock Wilson's foundation of a national organisation, the National Union of Seamen (NUS).

== Career ==
Cathery succeeded Wilson as general secretary of the NUS in 1894, which he renamed as the National Sailors' and Firemen's Union (NSFU). He served until 1926, then again from 1927 to 1928. During World War I, he served on the National Maritime Board, and he was made a Commander of the Order of the British Empire in 1920.

At the 1918 general election, Cathery stood in Bootle as a candidate of the NSFU, without the official support of either the Liberal Party or the Labour Party. He took 37.0% of the vote but was not elected.

Trade union offices
Preceded by Havelock Wilson	General Secretary of the National Amalgamated Sailors' and Firemen's Union; 1894–1926	Succeeded by William J. Davies
Preceded by William J. Davies	Acting General Secretary of the National Amalgamated Sailors' and Firemen's Union; 1927–1928	Succeeded by William Robert Spence
