= Percy Knight (trade unionist) =

Welsh trade unionist and political activist

Percy Knight OBE (1891 – January 1969) was a Welsh trade unionist and political activist.

Born near Newport, South Wales, Knight was educated at the Crindau School. As a youth, he jumped on board the Antiope ship as it was leaving port, heading to Naples, and thereby found work as a seaman. During World War I, he served with the 10th Cruiser Squadron, and was involved in rescue work following the Halifax Explosion.

Knight joined the National Union of Seamen (NUS), and in 1917 worked with its leader, Havelock Wilson, in setting up the National Maritime Board. He worked full-time for the union from 1923, and in 1943, he became the union's district secretary for Merseyside, then in 1944 was appointed as the union's National Organiser, moving to London. He was elected to the Labour Party's National Executive Committee (NEC) in 1945, and stood unsuccessfully for the party in Portsmouth Langstone at the 1950 general election.

Knight was made a Member of the Order of the British Empire in 1952, and in 1954 served as vice-chair of the Labour Party. He was expected to become the party's chair for 1955/56, but he refused the position, instead taking up work as Assistant General Secretary of the NUS. He retired at the end of 1955.
