= Science Policy Support Group =

The Science Policy Support Group Ltd (SPSG) contributed to UK science policy between 1986 and 2003. SPSG was set up by the Economic and Social Research Council (ESRC), with the initial support of the other Research Councils, to organise programmes of research and information on issues of science and technology policy identified as of strategic importance.

== Description ==
Its main means of operation was through defining, developing, seeking funding, and managing research programmes, bringing together scholars from a variety of institutions and disciplines, initially across the UK but later at European level. Themes included Defence Technology Management and Dual Use (co-funded by the MoD – leading to a European defence technology network), Academic Industry Relations (leading to the Triple Helix theory of innovation and the stream of activity organised by the Triple Helix Association ), understanding the European Context for UK Science Policy, and Public Understanding of Science, including the original specification of the ESRC Science in Society Programme and evidence to the House of Lords Select Committee on Science & Technology's enquiry on this theme (2000).

SPSG also organised a London-based science policy lunch club, and a series of thematic international conferences including the influential 1989 NATO advanced studies institute which led to the book The Research System in Transition about the wide range of consequences of science budget cuts and of new approaches to the evaluation and management of the scientific enterprise.

By 1989, SPSG had become a non-profit company, registered as a charity, by taking over the shell of the Technical Change Centre, an earlier cross-Research Council initiative. The SPSG Board was chaired by Professor David Edge (1989–1992), Professor (later Sir) Roger Williams (1992–1998) and Sir Ian Lloyd MP (1998–2003). The first director of SPSG was Professor John Ziman, FRS and the programme manager Peter Healey, who became managing director in 1993.

A review in 1999 concluded that SPSG had been responsible for much of the work which underpinned the 1993 S&T white paper Realising our Potential, but SPSG never lost a controversial reputation with science funders for producing uncomfortable knowledge, and this ultimately cost it its core funding. This reputation started with its encouragement in the late 1980s of independent debate on research which purported to show the decline in UK science, and continued with John Ziman's exploration of the bounds of government support of science and the risks of excessive accountability which he later developed into the book Prometheus Bound: science in a dynamic steady state (Cambridge University Press, 1994) and with research which some considered gave undue emphasis to social and economic perspectives on science and technology. SPSG was wound up in 2003.
