= Tom Yates =

British trade unionist

Sir Thomas Yates (26 September 1896 – 27 May 1978) was a British trade unionist.

Born in Wallasey, Yates studied locally at St Mary's School before, at the age of seventeen, going to sea, working as a steward. With the First World War ongoing, he joined the Loyal North Lancashire Regiment. He married Lillian in 1918 and had four children (Grace known as Win, Les, Doug and Len), soon returning to sea, eventually becoming a head waiter and librarian for the Cunard Line. He became involved in the National Union of Seamen (NUS), and was made an official in 1928, then a district secretary in 1940, firstly for the south west coast, then a year later for Scotland. In 1942, he was promoted to National Organiser, then the following year to Assistant General Secretary. Finally, in 1947, he was elected to the top job of General Secretary of the NUS. In this post, he was known for his anti-communism,

Yates was made a Commander of the Order of the British Empire in 1951, and was then knighted in 1959. In 1957/8, he served as President of the Trades Union Congress. He retired from his union post in 1960, the same year that his wife died. He remarried (Dorothy Yates) in 1962 and the year after was appointed to the Southern Region Railway Board. Among his many other appointments were chairing the Merchant Seamen's War Memorial Society, and serving on the Coastal Advisory Committee, Merchant Navy Training Board and Seamen's Welfare Board. In old age, he retired to Sydney in Australia.

Trade union offices
Preceded by Charles Jarman	General Secretary of the National Union of Seamen; 1947–1960	Succeeded by Jim Scott
Preceded by Florence Hancock and Will Lawther	Trades Union Congress representative to the American Federation of Labour; 1951; With: Jim Kelly	Succeeded by Alfred Roberts
Preceded by Tom Williamson	President of the Trades Union Congress; 1957–1958	Succeeded by Robert Willis
