= William J. Davies =

Welsh trade union leader

William John Davies was a Welsh trade union leader.

Davies qualified as a pilot working in Swansea Harbour in 1900. He became a captain, and an official in the UK Pilots' Association. In 1913, he became the Bristol Channel representative on the pilotage committee of the Board of Trade. He also became a member of the Seafarers' Joint Council, an honorary member of the National Union of Seamen (NUS) and then a trustee of the NUS.

In June 1925 (16th, 17th & 18th), for the United Kingdom Pilot's conference held in Swansea by the United Kingdom Pilot's Association, Davies (as new vice-president of the pilot's association) along with Captain Harris and Cape Horner Captain Richard Phelps Gough were chiefly responsible as members of the Reception Committee

Davies stood to become general secretary of the NUS in December 1926, with the backing of union president Havelock Wilson. He defeated George Jackson by 11,556 votes to 1,736, and won the post. However, Davies became concerned about Wilson's absence from union affairs, as Wilson focused on forming a non-political union for miners. While the NUS voted to fund Wilson's venture, Davies sought legal advice, and found that voting irregularities and a lack of notice of the vote might lead to issues. He decided to allow an injunction to stop its activity until a special general meeting was held. Wilson was angry at this, believing it was part of a plot by Joe Cotter to take over the union. Wilson accused Davies of negligence and incompetence, and arranged for Davies to be suspended until the union held its annual general meeting. In September, Davies instead resigned as general secretary, and was soon expelled from the union.

Trade union offices
Preceded by Edmund Cathery	General Secretary of the National Union of Seamen; 1926–1927	Succeeded by Edmund Cathery
