= Jim Slater (trade unionist) =

Jim Slater (4 October 1923 – 30 May 1993) was a British trade union leader.

Born in South Shields, Slater went to sea in 1941, and joined the National Union of Seamen (NUS). During World War II, he served in the Merchant Navy. On one occasion his ship was torpedoed and sank, and in line with practice at the time, his pay was immediately stopped.

In 1960, he became a leading figure in new the National Seamen's Reform Movement, which was active in that year's strike. He was expelled from the industry at the end of the strikes, but continued as a union activist. In order to regain employment in the industry, he had to agree in future to abide by all decision of the union. He stood for the post of General Secretary of the NUS in 1962, but was easily beaten by Bill Hogarth. In 1964, he became District Secretary for the North East, and joined the union's executive. He was active in the seamen's strike of 1966, during which Harold Wilson implied he was one of several union activists under communist influence, a charge which Slater rejected.

Slater became Assistant Secretary of the NUS in 1970, and in 1974 he beat Sam McCluskie to become General Secretary. During this time, he successfully negotiated with the British Shipping Federation to retain a closed shop. He also convinced the Trades Union Congress to support the union's policy to refuse to dump nuclear waste at sea, and donated union funds to support the UK miners' strike of 1984–1985. In 1986, the union's rules compelled Slater to stand down, and he instead became President of the NUS.

Tom Hadaway wrote the play "Seafarers" in 1993, based on a true story of Slater being arrested after his Geordie accent led to him being mistaken for a spy. The play put the action in Florida and had him mistaken for a Russian, but the original event occurred in Canada, and he was mistaken for a Serbo-Croat.

In the last years of his life, Slater was involved in the campaign for a proper investigation of the sinking of the MV Derbyshire.

Trade union offices
Preceded by Bill Hogarth	General Secretary of the National Union of Seamen; 1974–1986	Succeeded by Sam McCluskie
Preceded by Position recreated	President of the National Union of Seamen; 1986–1990	Succeeded by Position abolished
