= Sam McCluskie =

British trade union leader (1932–1995)

Sam McCluskie (11 August 1932 – 15 September 1995) was a British Labour Party politician and trade unionist. He came from Leith in Edinburgh. He followed Albert Booth as treasurer of the Labour Party from 1984 to 1992. He was general secretary of the National Union of Seamen from 1986 until its 1990 merger which formed the RMT. He held an executive position within the newly established union until his retirement in 1991.

In 1988, McCluskie recorded a fundraising single with John Prescott.

Party political offices
Preceded by Judith Hart	Chair of the Labour Party; 1982–1983	Succeeded by Eric Heffer
Preceded by Albert Booth	Treasurer of the Labour Party; 1984–1992	Succeeded by Tom Burlison
Trade union offices
Preceded by Jim Slater	General Secretary of the National Union of Seamen; 1986–1990	Succeeded by Position abolished
