= Geoffrey Stevens (British politician) =

British politician

Geoffrey Paul Stevens (10 November 1902 – 10 May 1981) was an English chartered accountant and politician who was noted for his support for reductions in taxation.

== Early life ==
Stevens was born in London, England and was sent to Westminster School, the leading Independent school. He qualified as a chartered accountant in 1926 and joined the firm of Pannell Fitzpatrick and Co., becoming a Partner in 1930. In 1932, a letter from Stevens was published in The Times which argued that spending on the Royal Navy was for the defence of Britain's frontier and a requirement of the government. He joined the Royal Air Force Volunteer Reserve and during the Second World War he served with the Royal Air Force.

== Politics ==
At the 1945 general election, Stevens fought Sheffield Park as the Conservative Party candidate; the seat proved safe for Labour. For the next general election in 1950, Stevens was adopted as Conservative candidate for Portsmouth Langstone, a new constituency consisting of some wealthy areas around Langstone Harbour (Havant, Waterlooville) as well as the mostly public housing of Paulsgrove. Although the election result was thought in doubt, Stevens was elected with a majority of over 11,000.

== Opinions ==
Stevens was a popular man who became Chairman of the United and Cecil Club in 1951, in succession to Eric Errington, a former Conservative MP; he held this role for four years, passing it on to Philip Bell MP. He sought to use his experience of accountancy in Parliament, arguing in 1951 for professional accountants to examine the state of the nationalised industries in order to allow boldness in management while maintaining accountability to the representatives of the public. He was a strong advocate of reductions in taxation and became chairman of the Income Tax-Payers' Society; in 1959 he said that he hoped to see income tax reduced to 6s. in the Pound, the level at the foundation of the society in 1921.

In 1956, Stevens supported British participation in negotiations over European institutions, but rejected the idea of any supra-national authority. The next year he tabled a motion condemning British European Airways for removing the Union Flag from their advertising. Later that year he won a place in the ballot for Private Members Bills, and introduced the Metropolitan Police Act (1839) Amendment Bill which proposed to increase the fine for threatening and insulting behaviour. The Bill received a second reading but did not make further progress. He attempted to introduce binding arbitration for taxation disputes in an amendment to the 1958 Finance Bill.

== Campaigns ==
Stevens supported the Society for Individual Freedom and sponsored dinners for the Society at the House of Commons. He was Vice Chairman of the Conservative backbench Finance committee. In the debate on the Finance Bill in 1960, when an all-night sitting was thought to be in prospect, Stevens appeared at the Bar of the House of Commons dressed in a silk dressing gown. In November 1960, Stevens signed an amendment calling for the reversal of the judgement which held Lady Chatterley's Lover not to be an obscene publication.

== Retirement ==
However, Stevens' health caused him concern, and in January 1962 he announced that he would not stand for re-election as he was going deaf; both his father and brother had gone deaf at early age, and he believed he could not "continue work which necessitates understanding a question and answering it". He continued to press for lower taxes, arguing that many who called for higher tax on unearned income did not realise that those receiving it had previously worked to build up their assets.

Leaving the House of Commons at the 1964 general election, Stevens moved to Haslemere. He retired as Partner of Pannell, Fitzpatrick & Co. in 1970.

Parliament of the United Kingdom
| New constituency | Member of Parliament for Portsmouth Langstone; 1950 – 1964 | Succeeded by Ian Lloyd |
