= Charles Jarman =

British trade union leader

Charles Jarman CBE (1893 – 30 May 1947) was a British trade union leader.

Born in Bristol, Jarman went to sea when he was fourteen, and soon joined the Royal Navy. After several years, he left the Navy due to an injury. He became involved in the National Union of Seamen (NUS), becoming its national organiser, and then its district secretary, successively in the Bristol Channel, Mersey, North East Scotland and then Scottish districts. Next, he moved to New York City as the union's representative in the United States.

Jarman succeeded as leader of the NUS in 1942. Due to the ongoing Second World War, it was agreed that he would hold the title of acting general secretary until an election could be organised, planned for one year after the end of the war. He also joined the General Council of the Trades Union Congress, and was president of the Seamen's Section of the International Transport Workers' Federation. Under Jarman's influence, in 1946, the International Labour Conference adopted an international minimum wage for seafarers.

Jarman was also active in the Labour Party, and served on its National Executive Committee for four years. At the 1935 United Kingdom general election, he stood unsuccessfully for the party in Birmingham Yardley.

Jarman died unexpectedly in 1947, aged 54.

Trade union offices
Preceded by William Robert Spence	Acting General Secretary of the National Union of Seamen; 1942–47	Succeeded by Tom Yates
