= Havant and Waterloo (constituency) =

UK Parliament constituency (1974–1983)

- Former constituency for the House of Commons
- Havant and Waterloo in Hampshire, showing boundaries used from 1974–1983
- County: Hampshire

1974–1983
- Seats: One
- Created from: Petersfield and Portsmouth Langstone
- Replaced by: Havant and Portsmouth North

Havant and Waterloo was a parliamentary constituency centred on the towns of Havant and Waterlooville in Hampshire. It returned one Member of Parliament (MP) to the House of Commons of the Parliament of the United Kingdom, elected by the first past the post system.

== History ==
The constituency was created for the February 1974 general election, and was abolished for the 1983 general election.

== Boundaries ==
The area of the constituency was the same as that of the Havant and Waterloo Urban District, on the south coast of England. The seat covered the semi-urban area in the south east of Hampshire, between the city of Portsmouth and the West Sussex border.

As part of the re-organisation of local government, in 1974–1975, the Urban District was incorporated in the Borough of Havant.

== Members of Parliament ==
Election	Member	Party
Feb 1974	Ian Lloyd	Conservative
1983	constituency abolished: see Havant	

== Elections ==
=== Elections in the 1970s ===
General election 1979: Havant and Waterloo
Party	Candidate	Votes	%	±%
Conservative	Ian Lloyd	35,580	57.30	
Labour	D.B. Hoodless	15,240	24.54	
Liberal	David Amies	11,274	18.16	
Majority		20,340	32.76	
Turnout		62,094	75.62	
Conservative hold		Swing		

General election October 1974: Havant and Waterloo
Party	Candidate	Votes	%	±%
Conservative	Ian Lloyd	24,880	44.71	
Liberal	S. Brewin	16,148	29.02	
Labour	T. King	14,615	26.27	
Majority		8,732	15.69	
Turnout		55,643	73.73	
Conservative hold		Swing		

General election February 1974: Havant and Waterloo
Party	Candidate	Votes	%	±%
Conservative	Ian Lloyd	27,397	45.93	
Liberal	S. Brewin	18,209	30.53	
Labour	J.T. Acklaw	13,367	22.41	
Independent	R.E. Wakeford	675	1.13	
Majority		9,188	15.40	
Turnout		59,648	79.96	
Conservative win (new seat)				
