= Bill Hogarth =

William Hogarth CBE (13 January 1911 – 13 May 1973) was a Scottish laborer organiser who was General Secretary of the National Union of Seamen, elected in 1962.

A native of Glasgow, he began his career as a deck boy making 50 shillings a month. He was appointed a Commander of the Order of the British Empire in the 1972 Birthday Honours.

Trade union offices
Preceded by Jim Scott	General Secretary of the National Union of Seamen; 1962–1973	Succeeded by Jim Slater
