= Ian Lloyd (politician) =

British politician

Sir Ian Lloyd

Member of Parliament for Havant (Havant and Waterloo 1974–1983) (Portsmouth Langstone 1964–1974)
- In office 15 October 1964 – 16 March 1992
- Preceded by: Geoffrey Stevens
- Succeeded by: David Willetts

Personal details
- Born: 30 May 1921 Durban, Union of South Africa
- Died: 25 September 2006 (aged 85) Chichester, West Sussex, England
- Resting place: Priors Dean, Hampshire, England
- Party: Conservative

Sir Ian Stewart Lloyd (30 May 1921 – 25 September 2006) was a British Conservative Party politician. Born in South Africa to wealthy English parents, he worked as a civil servant in the South African Board of Trade before moving permanently to England in the 1950s. He served as a backbench Member of Parliament for constituencies near Portsmouth nearly 30 years, from 1964 to 1992. He took an interest in African issues, shipping, and technology, and spoke about the dangers of global warming as early as 1989.

== Early and private life ==
Lloyd was born in Durban in South Africa, the son of Walter John Lloyd and his wife, Carmen Craig Stewart Murray. Ian Lloyd's great-grandfather, Capt. Walter Lloyd (1823–1878), had emigrated from his native Wales to the British colony of Natal, as it then was, in the middle of the nineteenth century; the Lloyd family's ancestral home, Coedmore, is situated in Cardiganshire.

Ian Lloyd was educated at St. John's Preparatory in Johannesburg, at Michaelhouse in Natal, and at the University of Witwatersrand. In the Second World War, he served in the South African Air Force as a Spitfire pilot and then Flight instructor. After the War, he attended King's College, Cambridge. He was President of the Cambridge Union in 1947, served with the RAFVR, and sailed and skied for the university. He graduated with an MSc in 1952, and studied at the Administrative College at Henley-on-Thames.

He married Frances Addison in 1951-2012, daughter of the Hon. William Addison. They had three sons together; Jonathan, Mark and Peregrine.

He returned to South Africa, where he joined the Torch Commando protest group of World War II veterans, and the United Party. He became the economic adviser at the Central Mining and Investment Corporation, part of the South African Board of Trade and Industries. He resigned and permanently left South Africa in 1955, driven away by his disagreement with the policy of apartheid. Returning to the UK, he became a shipping executive, as director of research at British and Commonwealth Shipping Company from 1956 to 1964. He remained its economic adviser until 1983.

== Political career ==
He was selected for the safe seat of Portsmouth Langstone in 1962, and duly elected as Member of Parliament at the 1964 general election. However, he was not the first member of the Lloyd family to be elected to Parliament. His great-great-uncle, Thomas Edward Lloyd (1820-1909), served as the M.P. for Cardiganshire between 1874 and 1880 as a member of the Conservative government led by Benjamin Disraeli. Ian Lloyd remained an MP until his retirement at the 1992 election, having changed constituency twice after boundary changes, to Havant and Waterloo in 1974 and to Havant in 1983. He had to fight for re-selection from 1971 to 1973, after the constituency boundaries changed, after the selection committee of his constituency party voted to deselect him. He was re-endorsed, but then his re-endorsement was challenged by Janet Fookes.

He served on the Council of Europe, and on the parliamentary assembly of the Western European Union, from 1968 to 1972.

In Parliament, he took a close interest in African issues, shipping, and science. He spoke against sanctions against Rhodesia after UDI, and compared Kenneth Kaunda to Hitler. He remained a critic of the apartheid in South Africa; however, he later opposed economic sanctions and the sporting boycott, arguing that closer links would be more effective in stimulating reform. As a result, he became seen as an advocate for the South African government in Westminster, being attacked as "Botha's mouthpiece".

He was a member of the Select committee on Technology for 10 years, and then chairman of the Select Committee on Energy for 10 years. He drove the establishment of the Parliamentary Information Technology Committee (Pitcom), and the Parliamentary Office of Science and Technology (POST). He argued for the appointment of a minister for information technology, and was one of the first to bring a microchip into the House of Commons. He supported nuclear power, and recognised the dangers of global warming as early as 1989, when he argued that "civilisation is clinging by our fingernails to the cliff". He was knighted in the 1986 Queen's Birthday Honours List.

== Outside politics ==
He wrote a series of books on the history of Rolls-Royce, published in 1978. He was also a member of the Royal Yacht Squadron.

In retirement, he was a member of the council of Save British Science, and a member of the Science Policy Support Group. He died in Chichester, West Sussex and is buried at Priors Dean.

Parliament of the United Kingdom
Preceded by Geoffrey Stevens	Member of Parliament for Portsmouth Langstone; 1964–February 1974	Constituency abolished
New constituency	Member of Parliament for Havant and Waterloo; February 1974–1983	Constituency abolished
New constituency	Member of Parliament for Havant; 1983–1992	Succeeded by David Willetts
