= Havant (constituency) =

UK Parliament constituency (since 1983)

Coordinates: 50.82°N 0.98°W

- Borough constituency for the House of Commons
- Interactive map of boundaries since 1997
- Boundary within South East England
- County: Hampshire
- Electorate: 72,766 (2023)
- Major settlements: Bedhampton; Emsworth; Havant; Warblington

Current constituency
- Created: 1983
- Member of Parliament: Alan Mak (Conservative)
- Seats: One
- Created from: Havant & Waterloo

Havant (/ˈhævənt/) is a constituency (Note: A borough constituency (for the purposes of election expenses and type of returning officer)) in Hampshire represented in the House of Commons of the UK Parliament since 2015 by Alan Mak, a member of the Conservative Party. He is the first person of Chinese and East Asian origin to be elected to the House of Commons.

== Constituency profile ==
Havant is a constituency located in Hampshire that forms part of the South Hampshire conurbation, east of the city of Portsmouth. The constituency is almost coterminous with the Borough of Havant but excludes the town of Waterlooville. Its main settlement is the town of Havant, which has a population of around 48,000. The constituency also covers Hayling Island, the small town of Emsworth and the village of Purbrook. The town of Havant developed rapidly after World War II to accommodate people displaced by the bombing of Portsmouth and London during the war, and now mostly serves as a commuter town. Havant has average levels of wealth, although the northern suburb of Leigh Park has high levels of deprivation and council housing. Emsworth is generally affluent, and Hayling Island is popular with tourists. House prices in the constituency are similar to the national average but lower than the rest of South East England.

Residents of the constituency are generally older and have low levels of education and income. A high proportion of residents work in education and manufacturing. White people made up 96% of the population at the 2021 census. At the local district council, Havant is represented by mostly Labour Party and some Reform UK councillors, Purbrook and Hayling Island mostly by Liberal Democrats and Emsworth by Greens. Voters in the constituency strongly supported leaving the European Union in the 2016 referendum; an estimated 63% voted in favour of Brexit compared to the nationwide figure of 52%.

== Boundaries ==
1983–1997: The Borough of Havant wards of Barncroft, Battins, Bedhampton, Bondfields, Cowplain, Emsworth, Hart Plain, Hayling East, Hayling West, St Faith's, Warren Park, and Waterloo.

1997–2024: The Borough of Havant wards of Barncroft, Battins, Bedhampton, Bondfields, Emsworth, Hayling East, Hayling West, Purbrook, St Faith's, Stakes, and Warren Park.

2024–present: The 2023 periodic review of Westminster constituencies, which was based on the ward structure in place on 1 December 2020, left the boundaries unchanged. However, following a local government boundary review which came into effect in May 2024, the constituency now comprises the following from the 2024 general election:

- The Borough of Havant wards of: Bedhampton; Emsworth; Havant St Faith's; Hayling East; Hayling West; Leigh Park Central & West Leigh; Leigh Park Heritage; Purbrook; Stakes.

== History ==
The constituency was preceded by Havant and Waterloo.

The current MP Alan Mak is the first person of Chinese and East Asian origin to be elected to the House of Commons of the United Kingdom.

== Members of Parliament ==
Havant & Waterloo prior to 1983

Election	Member	Party
1983	Ian Lloyd	Conservative
1992	David Willetts	Conservative
2015	Alan Mak	Conservative

== Elections ==
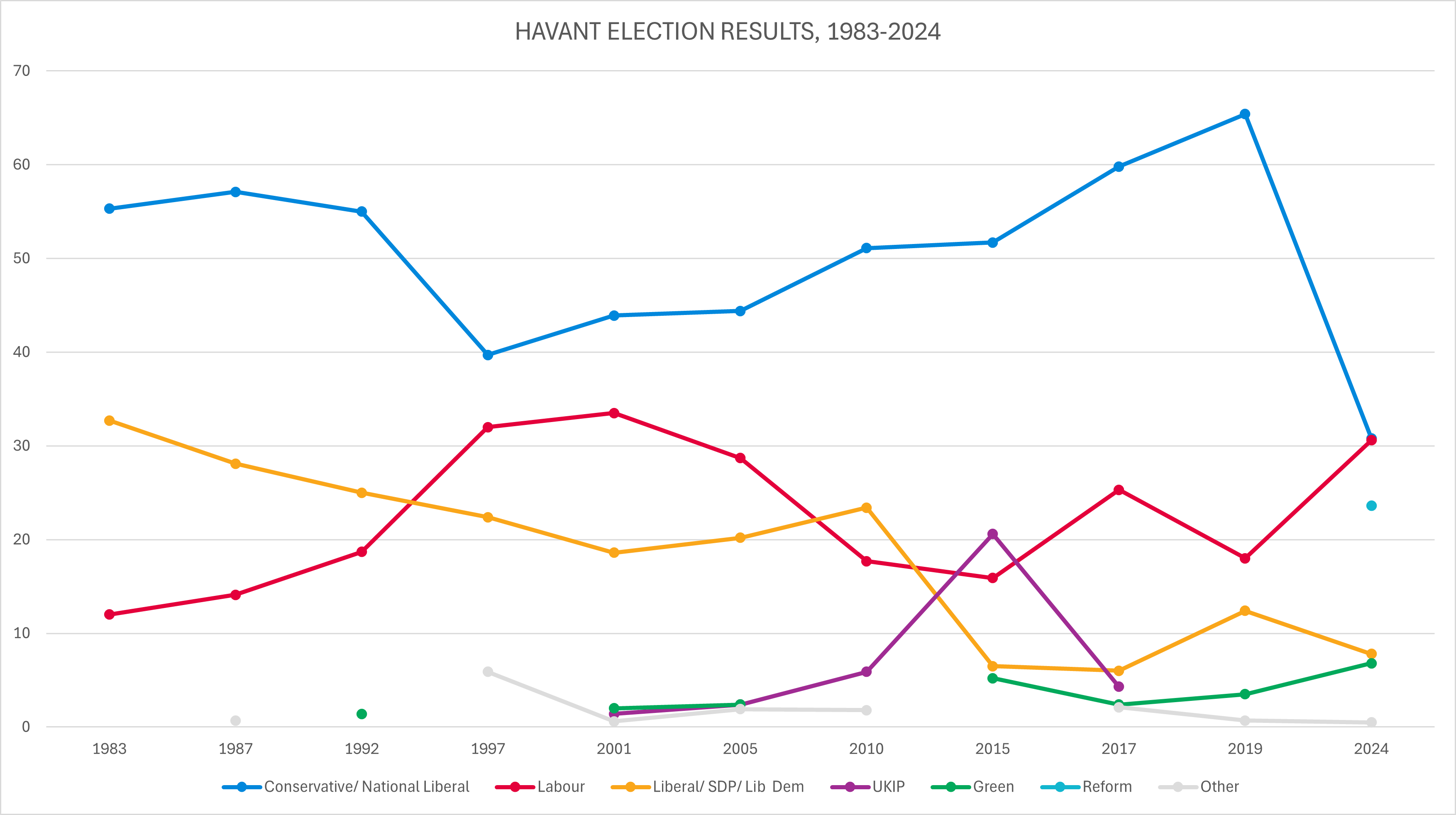
Election results 1983–2024

=== Elections in the 2020s ===
General election 2024: Havant
Party	Candidate	Votes	%	±%
Conservative	Alan Mak	12,986	30.8	−34.6
Labour	Stefanie Harvey	12,894	30.6	+12.6
Reform	John Perry	9,959	23.6	N/A
Liberal Democrats	Gayathri Sathyanath	3,275	7.8	−4.6
Green	Jeanette Shepherd	2,861	6.8	+3.3
Workers Party	Jennifer Alemanno	211	0.5	N/A
Majority		92	0.2	−47.2
Turnout		42,186	58.5	−4.7
Registered electors		72,346		
Conservative hold		Swing	−23.6	

=== Elections in the 2010s ===
General election 2019: Havant
Party	Candidate	Votes	%	±%
Conservative	Alan Mak	30,051	65.4	+5.6
Labour	Rosamund Knight	8,259	18.0	−7.3
Liberal Democrats	Paul Gray	5,708	12.4	+6.4
Green	John Colman	1,597	3.5	+1.1
SDP	Alan Black	344	0.7	N/A
Majority		21,792	47.4	+12.9
Turnout		45,959	63.7	−0.2
Conservative hold		Swing	+6.5	

General election 2017: Havant
Party	Candidate	Votes	%	±%
Conservative	Alan Mak	27,676	59.8	+8.1
Labour	Graham Giles	11,720	25.3	+9.4
Liberal Democrats	Paul Gray	2,801	6.0	−0.5
UKIP	John Perry	2,011	4.3	−16.3
Green	Tim Dawes	1,122	2.4	−2.8
Independent	Ann Buckley	984	2.1	N/A
Majority		15,956	34.5	+3.4
Turnout		46,399	63.9	+0.4
Conservative hold		Swing	−0.6	

General election 2015: Havant
Party	Candidate	Votes	%	±%
Conservative	Alan Mak	23,159	51.7	+0.6
UKIP	John Perry	9,239	20.6	+14.7
Labour	Graham Giles	7,149	15.9	−1.8
Liberal Democrats	Steve Sollitt	2,929	6.5	−16.9
Green	Tim Dawes	2,352	5.2	N/A
Majority		13,920	31.1	+3.4
Turnout		44,828	63.5	+0.5
Conservative hold		Swing	−7.05	

General election 2010: Havant
Party	Candidate	Votes	%	±%
Conservative	David Willetts	22,433	51.1	+6.7
Liberal Democrats	Alex Payton	10,273	23.4	+3.2
Labour	Robert Smith	7,777	17.7	−11.0
UKIP	Gary Kerrin	2,611	5.9	+3.5
English Democrat	Fungus Addams	809	1.8	N/A
Majority		12,160	27.7	+12.0
Turnout		43,903	63.0	+2.7
Conservative hold		Swing	+1.8	

=== Elections in the 2000s ===
General election 2005: Havant
Party	Candidate	Votes	%	±%
Conservative	David Willetts	18,370	44.4	+0.5
Labour	Sarah Bogle	11,862	28.7	−4.8
Liberal Democrats	Alexander Bentley	8,358	20.2	+1.6
Green	Timothy Dawes	1,006	2.4	+0.4
UKIP	Stephen Harris	998	2.4	+1.0
BNP	Ian Johnson	562	1.4	N/A
Veritas	Russell Thomas	195	0.5	N/A
Majority		6,508	15.7	+5.3
Turnout		41,351	60.3	+2.7
Conservative hold		Swing	+2.65	

General election 2001: Havant
Party	Candidate	Votes	%	±%
Conservative	David Willetts	17,769	43.9	+4.2
Labour	Peter Guthrie	13,562	33.5	+1.5
Liberal Democrats	Catherine Cole	7,508	18.6	−3.8
Green	Kevin Jacks	793	2.0	N/A
UKIP	Timothy Cuell	561	1.4	N/A
Independent	Roy Stanley	244	0.6	N/A
Majority		4,207	10.4	+2.7
Turnout		40,437	57.6	−12.8
Conservative hold		Swing	+1.35	

=== Elections in the 1990s ===
General election 1997: Havant
Party	Candidate	Votes	%	±%
Conservative	David Willetts	19,204	39.7	−13.1
Labour	Lynne Armstrong	15,475	32.0	+12.3
Liberal Democrats	Michael Kooner	10,806	22.4	−3.7
Referendum	Anthony Green	2,395	5.0	N/A
British Isles People First Party	Major Atwal	442	0.9	N/A
Majority		3,729	7.7	
Turnout		48,322	70.4	
Conservative hold		Swing	−12.7	

General election 1992: Havant
Party	Candidate	Votes	%	±%
Conservative	David Willetts	32,233	55.0	−2.1
Liberal Democrats	Stephen van Hagen	14,649	25.0	−3.1
Labour	Graham Morris	10,968	18.7	+4.6
Green	Terry Mitchell	793	1.4	N/A
Majority		17,584	30.0	+1.0
Turnout		58,643	79.0	+4.4
Conservative hold		Swing	+0.5	

=== Elections in the 1980s ===
General election 1987: Havant
Party	Candidate	Votes	%	±%
Conservative	Ian Lloyd	32,527	57.1	+1.8
SDP	Elizabeth Cleaver	16,017	28.1	−4.6
Labour	James Philips	8,030	14.1	+2.1
Creek Road Fresh Bread Party	Gerald Fuller	373	0.7	N/A
Majority		16,510	29.0	+6.4
Turnout		56,947	74.6	+2.5
Conservative hold		Swing		

General election 1983: Havant
Party	Candidate	Votes	%	±%
Conservative	Ian Lloyd	29,148	55.3	
SDP	Elizabeth Cleaver	17,192	32.7	
Labour	Robert Norris	6,335	12.0	
Majority		11,956	22.6	
Turnout		52,675	72.1	
Conservative win (new seat)				

== See also ==
- List of parliamentary constituencies in Hampshire
- List of parliamentary constituencies in the South East England (region)

== Sources ==
- Election result, 2005 (BBC)
- Election results, 1997 – 2001 (BBC)
- Election results, 1997 – 2001 (Election Demon)
- Election results, 1983 – 1992 (Election Demon)
- Election results, 1992 – 2005 (Guardian)
