= William Robert Spence =

William Robert Locke Spence, CBE, (9 October 1875 – 3 March 1954) was a British politician.

Born in Cockpen in Midlothian, Spence was educated at the Royal High School, Edinburgh. When he was fifteen, he became an apprentice sailor, and joined the National Sailors' and Firemen's Union (NSFU). He served in the Merchant Navy for many years, becoming an officer. However, in 1911, he became a strong supporter of the sailors' case in the strike. He resigned his commission, and devoted all his time to trade unionism.

In 1911, Spence began working full-time as an official of the NSFU, based on shore, initially in South Shields, and later in various ports in the south of England. In 1928, he was elected as the union's general secretary, and from 1931 to 1941, he additionally served on the General Council of the Trades Union Congress.

Spence was made a Commander of the Order of the British Empire in 1937. During World War II, he was a member of the Advisory Council to the Ministry of Shipping. He retired in 1942, settling in Shoreham-by-Sea.

Trade union offices
Preceded by Edmund Cathery	General Secretary of the National Amalgamated Sailors' and Firemen's Union; 1928 – 1942	Succeeded by Charles Jarman
Preceded by John Beard, Ernest Bevin and Ben Tillett	Transport Group member of the General Council of the Trades Union Congress; 1931 – 1941; With: John Beard (1931–1935); Ernest Bevin (1931 –1940); Walter Farthing (1935–1941); Arthur Deakin (1940–1941)	Succeeded by Arthur Deakin, Walter Farthing and Charles Jarman
