= National Union of Ship's Stewards =

Defunct British mariners' trade union circa WWI

The National Union of Ship's Stewards, Cooks, Butchers and Bakers was the principal trade union for service personnel serving aboard British merchant ships between 1909 and 1921.

It was formed in Liverpool in 1909 by Joe Cotter, a former Cunard steward. Over the years which followed it developed a strong following in the liner ports of Southampton, Glasgow, London, Bristol and Hull. In 1911 the union supported the seamen's strikes which broke out in all major British ports.

In 1921, the National Maritime Board imposed wage reductions for marine workers with the support and assistance of the principal seamen's union, the National Sailors' and Firemen's Union. The National Union of Ship's Stewards refused to endorse this move and instead supported attempts to resist the reductions. Much weakened by these efforts, the Stewards' Union amalgamated at the end of 1921 with the British Seafarers' Union to form the Amalgamated Marine Workers' Union.
