= Portsmouth Langstone =

Former parliamentary constituency in the United Kingdom

- Former borough constituency for the House of Commons
- Boundary of Portsmouth Langstone in Hampshire for the 1955 general election
- County: Hampshire

1950–1974
- Seats: One
- Created from: Portsmouth North, Fareham and Petersfield
- Replaced by: Havant and Waterloo and Portsmouth North

Portsmouth Langstone was a borough constituency in Portsmouth. It returned one Member of Parliament (MP) to the House of Commons of the Parliament of the United Kingdom, elected by the first past the post system.

== History ==
The constituency was created for the 1950 general election, and abolished for the February 1974 general election.

== Boundaries and boundary changes ==
Dates	Local authority	Maps	Wards
1950–1955	County Borough of Portsmouth; Havant and Waterloo Urban District		The County Borough of Portsmouth wards of Cosham and Meredith, and the Urban District of Havant and Waterloo.
1955–1974	County Borough of Portsmouth; Havant and Waterloo Urban District		The County Borough of Portsmouth wards of Cosham, Farlington, Meredith, and Paulsgrove, and the Urban District of Havant and Waterloo.

=== 1950–1955 ===
The constituency was formed from the abolished constituencies of Portsmouth North and Fareham as well as Waterlooville from the Petersfield constituency

=== 1955–1974 ===
Wards renamed

== Members of Parliament ==
Election	Member	Party	Notes
1950	Geoffrey Stevens	Conservative	
1964	Ian Lloyd	Conservative	Contested Havant and Waterloo following redistribution
Feb 1974	constituency abolished: see Havant and Waterloo and Portsmouth North		

== Elections ==
=== Elections in the 1950s ===
General election 1950: Portsmouth Langstone
Party	Candidate	Votes	%
Conservative	Geoffrey Stevens	29,477	59.0
Labour	Percy Knight	17,691	35.4
Liberal	Albert Jones	2,821	5.6
Majority		11,786	23.6
Turnout		49,989	83.7
Registered electors		59,711	
Conservative win (new seat)			

General election 1951: Portsmouth Langstone
Party	Candidate	Votes	%	±%
Conservative	Geoffrey Stevens	31,752	63.0	+4.0
Labour	John O'Neill Ryan	18,647	37.0	+1.6
Majority		13,105	26.0	+2.4
Turnout		50,399	81.8	−2.0
Registered electors		61,641		
Conservative hold		Swing	+1.2	

General election 1955: Portsmouth Langstone
Party	Candidate	Votes	%	±%
Conservative	Geoffrey Stevens	32,014	64.2	+1.2
Labour	Stanley Clinton-Davis	17,859	35.8	−1.2
Majority		14,155	28.4	+2.3
Turnout		49,873	73.0	−8.7
Registered electors		68,299		
Conservative hold		Swing	+1.2	

General election 1959: Portsmouth Langstone
Party	Candidate	Votes	%	±%
Conservative	Geoffrey Stevens	38,834	65.4	+1.2
Labour	Douglas Reynolds	20,553	34.6	−1.2
Majority		18,281	30.8	+2.4
Turnout		59,387	74.3	+1.3
Registered electors		79,885		
Conservative hold		Swing	+1.2	

=== Elections in the 1960s ===
General election 1964: Portsmouth Langstone
Party	Candidate	Votes	%	±%
Conservative	Ian Lloyd	33,208	48.3	−17.1
Labour	Terence Molloy	23,365	34.0	−0.6
Liberal	Rex Collings	12,212	17.8	N/A
Majority		9,843	14.3	−16.5
Turnout		68,785	75.1	+0.8
Registered electors		91,587		
Conservative hold		Swing	−8.2	

General election 1966: Portsmouth Langstone
Party	Candidate	Votes	%	±%
Conservative	Ian Lloyd	34,446	48.4	+0.1
Labour	Terence Molloy	26,197	36.8	+2.8
Liberal	David Griffiths	10,540	14.8	−2.9
Majority		8,249	11.6	−2.7
Turnout		70,183	74.0	−1.1
Registered electors		96,166		
Conservative hold		Swing	−1.4	

=== Elections in the 1970s ===
General election 1970: Portsmouth Langstone
Party	Candidate	Votes	%	±%
Conservative	Ian Lloyd	43,733	54.4	+6.0
Labour Co-op	Roger Kenward	26,492	33.0	−3.9
Liberal	Roger Anstey	10,226	12.7	−2.1
Majority		17,241	21.4	+9.8
Turnout		80,451	71.4	−2.7
Registered electors		112,725		
Conservative hold		Swing	+4.9	
