= Manny Shinwell =

British politician (1884–1986)

The Right Honourable The Lord Shinwell CH PC
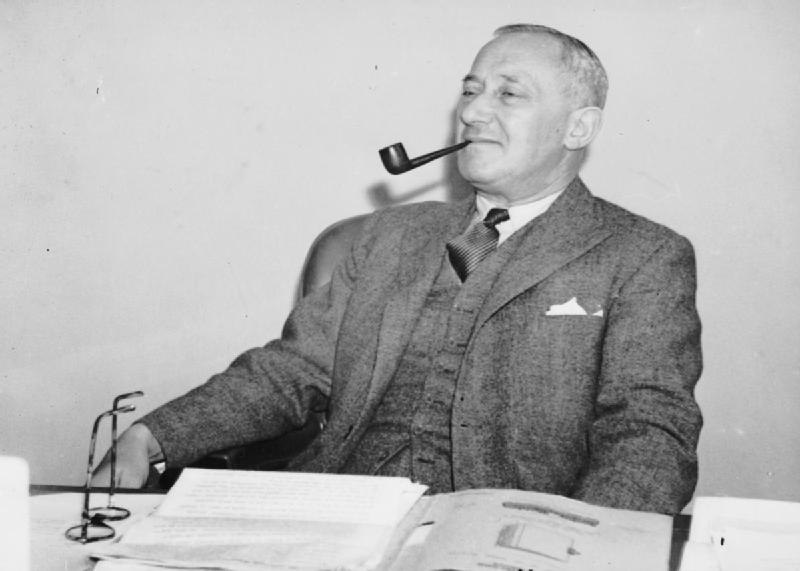
- Shinwell in the 1940s

Minister of Defence
- In office 28 February 1950 – 26 October 1951
- Prime Minister: Clement Attlee
- Preceded by: A. V. Alexander
- Succeeded by: Winston Churchill

Secretary of State for War
- In office 7 October 1947 – 28 February 1950
- Prime Minister: Clement Attlee
- Preceded by: Frederick Bellenger
- Succeeded by: John Strachey

Minister of Fuel and Power
- In office 3 August 1945 – 7 October 1947
- Prime Minister: Clement Attlee
- Preceded by: Gwilym Lloyd George
- Succeeded by: Hugh Gaitskell

Secretary for Mines
- In office 5 June 1930 – 3 September 1931
- Prime Minister: Ramsay MacDonald
- Preceded by: Ben Turner
- Succeeded by: Isaac Foot
- In office 23 January 1924 – 11 November 1924
- Prime Minister: Ramsay MacDonald
- Preceded by: George Lane-Fox
- Succeeded by: George Lane-Fox

Financial Secretary to the War Office
- In office 11 June 1929 – 5 June 1930
- Prime Minister: Ramsay MacDonald
- Preceded by: Duff Cooper
- Succeeded by: William Sanders
Parliamentary offices
Member of the House of Lords
Lord Temporal
Life peerage 29 June 1970 – 8 May 1986
Member of Parliament for Easington (Seaham 1935–1950)
In office 14 November 1935 – 29 May 1970
| Preceded by | Ramsay MacDonald |
| Succeeded by | Jack Dormand |
Member of Parliament for Linlithgowshire
In office 4 April 1928 – 7 October 1931
| Preceded by | James Kidd |
| Succeeded by | Adrian Baillie |
In office 15 November 1922 – 9 October 1924
| Preceded by | James Kidd |
| Succeeded by | James Kidd |

Personal details
- Born: Emanuel Shinwell; 18 October 1884 Spitalfields, London, England
- Died: 8 May 1986 (aged 101) London, England
- Party: Labour
- Spouses: Fanny Freeman (m. 1903; died 1954) Dinah Meyer (m. 1956; died 1971) Sarah Sturgo (m. 1972; died 1977)
- Children: 4
- Relatives: Luciana Berger (great-niece)

Emanuel Shinwell, Baron Shinwell (18 October 1884 – 8 May 1986) was a British politician who served as a government minister under Ramsay MacDonald and Clement Attlee. A member of the Labour Party, he served as a Member of Parliament (MP) for 40 years, representing Linlithgowshire, Seaham and Easington.

Born in the East End of London to a large family of Jewish immigrants, Shinwell moved to Glasgow as a boy and left school at the age of eleven. He became a trade union organiser and one of the leading figures of Red Clydeside. He was imprisoned in 1919 for his alleged involvement in the disturbances in Glasgow in January of that year. He served as a Labour MP from 1922 to 1924, and from a by-election in 1928 until 1931, and held junior office in the minority Labour Governments of 1924 and 1929–1931. He returned to the House of Commons in 1935, defeating former UK Prime Minister Ramsay MacDonald, who by that time had been expelled from the Labour Party. During the Second World War, he was a leading backbencher critic of the Coalition Government.

Shinwell is perhaps best remembered as the Minister of Fuel and Power in the Attlee ministry that nationalised coal mining in 1946. He was in charge of Britain's coal supply during the extremely harsh winter of January to March 1947, during which the supply system collapsed, leaving the United Kingdom to freeze and close down. He became unpopular with the public and was sacked in October 1947. He then served as Secretary of State for War, and then as Minister of Defence from 1950 to 1951. The high defence spending which he demanded, partly to pay for British involvement in the Korean War, was a major factor causing then-Chancellor of the Exchequer Hugh Gaitskell to impose NHS charges, prompting the resignation of Aneurin Bevan from the Cabinet.

Following Labour's defeat in 1951, Shinwell continued to serve in the Shadow Cabinet in Opposition until he stepped down in 1955. Thereafter he was a senior backbencher until 1970, by which time he was in his mid-eighties. That year he accepted a life peerage and was an active member of the House of Lords until shortly before his death, aged 101, in 1986.

== Early life, career and trade union activities ==
Shinwell was born in Spitalfields, London, but his family moved to Glasgow, Scotland. His father was a Polish Jew who had a small clothing shop, and his mother, a Dutch Jew, was a cook from London. He was the eldest of thirteen children.

He educated himself in a public library and at the Kelvingrove Art Gallery. He enjoyed sport, particularly boxing, and he was the trainer of a local football team. He left school at age eleven to be apprenticed as a tailor, and began his working life as a machinist in a clothing workshop. In 1903, he became active in the Amalgamated Union of Clothiers' Operatives, and joined the Glasgow Trades Council in 1906 as a delegate of that union.

In May 1911, he was seconded to help organise the seamen of Glasgow at the request of Havelock Wilson of the National Sailors' and Firemen's Union (NSFU). He played a prominent role in the six-week Glasgow seamen's strike which began on 14 June and which was part of a nationwide strike. He subsequently became the secretary of the Glasgow branch of the NSFU. In August 1912, he participated in a revolt against the union, which resulted in the Glasgow branch becoming part of the Southampton-based British Seafarers' Union (BSU). He was the local secretary of the BSU until it became part of the Amalgamated Marine Workers' Union (AMWU) in 1922, after which he served as National Organiser of the new organisation.

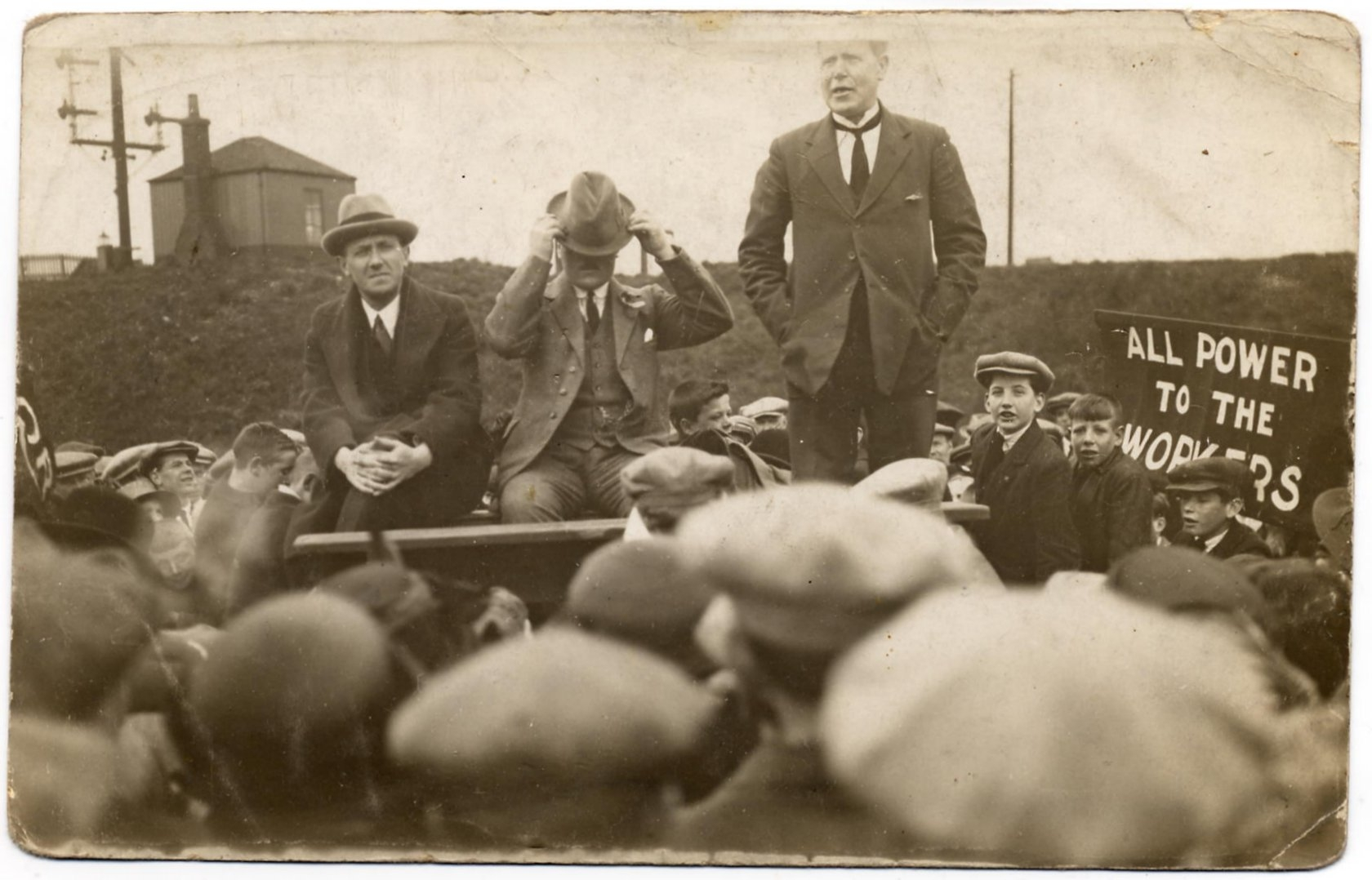
Shinwell (left) at an election meeting in 1918

In 1918, he stood unsuccessfully for Linlithgowshire (alternative name West Lothian).

In 1919, he gained national notoriety through his involvement in the Glasgow 40 Hours' Movement. This movement culminated in clashes between police and protesters in Glasgow's George Square in January 1919, in which he was alleged to have been involved. He was afterwards tried for incitement to riot and was sentenced to five months' imprisonment in Calton Jail, Edinburgh.

== Political career ==
=== Interwar and World War Two ===
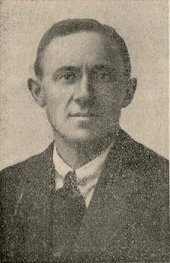
Shinwell in 1920

An Independent Labour Party (ILP) member, he was elected as Member of Parliament (MP) for Linlithgowshire at the 1922 general election.

In 1924 he was Secretary for Mines (not a Cabinet-level post) in the First Labour Government. He lost his seat in 1924, but was re-elected for Linlithgowshire at a by-election in 1928.

In the second Labour Government of 1929–1931, Ramsay MacDonald appointed him Financial Secretary to the War Office (1929–1930); Cowling says that MacDonald believed he had rescued Shinwell's ministerial career when no minister would take him. He then served again as Secretary for Mines from 1930 to 1931. At the time Shinwell was an admirer of MacDonald and tried to dissuade him from forming a National Government in 1931. He again lost his seat at the general election that year.

He returned to the Commons in 1935 after defeating MacDonald for Seaham Harbour, County of Durham (later renamed Easington after boundary changes in the late 1940s).

He campaigned vigorously, along with left-wingers such as Aneurin Bevan, for Britain to support the Popular Front government in Spain against Franco in the Spanish Civil War. On 4 April 1938, he doggedly criticised the government's foreign policy during a heated House of Commons debate. Eventually, Conservative MP Robert Bower became exasperated and shouted at him to "go back to Poland!". Shinwell took this to be an antisemitic remark and struck Bower on the side of the head causing internal bleeding, a blood clot, and a burst left eardrum. Both men then apologized to each other.

In May 1940 Shinwell refused a position in Winston Churchill's Coalition Government in the Ministry of Food. He thought the offer of the Food post a "bloody insult". He became chairman of the Labour Party in 1942. During the Second World War he was a vigorous but patriotic backbench critic of Churchill. He and Earl Winterton, another serial critic of the government, were known as "Arsenic and Old Lace".

=== Attlee Governments: 1945–1951 ===
==== Minister of Fuel and Power ====
He served in Clement Attlee's Cabinet after the Labour victory in 1945 as Minister of Fuel and Power, and in 1946 he presided over the nationalisation of the mining industry. He also negotiated a miners' charter with the NUM. He declared the middle class "not worth a tinker's cuss". His insistence on the open-cast mining of the park of the Wentworth Woodhouse estate, to the doorsteps of the house, when the quality of the coal was poor, was viewed by its owners and the local mining community, which opposed it, as pure vindictiveness – an act of class warfare. In 1947-8 he was Chairman of the Labour Party.

In 1947, Britain experienced, in an exceptionally severe winter, a serious coal shortage. The supply system collapsed, leaving Britain to freeze and close down. Shinwell denied there were problems and refused to assume responsibility, blaming the climate, the railway system, or capitalism generally. Shinwell was widely criticised for his failure to avert this crisis. His earlier comment that "There will be no fuel crisis. I am Minister of Fuel and Power and I ought to know", was later included in the official handbook for Conservative Party members to use in speeches and leaflets.

In 1947 Shinwell presided over the nationalisation of electricity. In October 1947 he was sacked. He was bitterly resentful at being replaced by Hugh Gaitskell, his former deputy and a public schoolboy. He was also attacked by James Callaghan (then a junior minister) for his lack of zeal about further nationalisation.

==== Secretary of State for War ====
Shinwell was demoted to Secretary of State for War (Minister for the Army, but no longer a full member of the Cabinet) a position which he held until 1950. He was a vigorous War Minister, who got on well with the Army and was seen as jingoistic.

In November 1947 a report from MI5 alleged that Shinwell had passed secret information to a man named "Stanley", who had passed it on to Zionist paramilitary group, the Irgun. Shinwell knew self-styled "contact man" Sidney Stanley, whom he had approached for help in finding employment for his son Ernie, and Stanley had obtained information on the disbandment of the Transjordan Frontier Force from some government source.

==== Minister of Defence ====
Shinwell's seat became Easington at the February 1950 election, after which he was promoted to Minister of Defence and became a full member of the Cabinet once more. Edmund Dell described him as "putty in the hands of the defence chiefs" and his promotion as "[a] ludicrous appointment. No failure was ever great enough to persuade Attlee to deny one of his cohorts new opportunities to do damage … Shinwell never forgave Gaitskell, whom he blamed for his disgrace." Gaitskell, promoted to Chancellor of the Exchequer later in the year, recorded in his diary that Shinwell "never loses an opportunity of picking a quarrel with me, sometimes on the most ridiculous grounds".

His term of office saw the Malayan Emergency and the early stages of Korean War, which began in June 1950 and to which British troops were deployed. Shinwell was responsible for the rearmament programme which precipitated the resignation of Aneurin Bevan from the Cabinet in the spring of 1951, although Gaitskell actually gave him less defence spending than he wanted. In the summer of 1951 the Cabinet blocked him from sending British troops to Abadan when the oil refineries were nationalised by the Iranian government.

Shinwell was by now seen as being on the right of the Labour Party. At the Labour Party Conference at Scarborough that autumn, he lost his place as an elected constituency representative on the Labour Party National Executive Committee (NEC), the members of which were increasingly elected by Bevanites in the constituency parties. Labour lost the general election a month later.

=== Later political career ===
Shinwell stepped down from the Shadow Cabinet (which at that time was elected by Labour MPs when the party was in opposition) in 1955. That year he published a volume of memoirs, Conflict Without Malice. By the early 1960s he had changed his mind about nuclear weapons and opposed the deployment of US nuclear submarines to Holy Loch.

Shinwell did not resume ministerial office when Labour returned to power in October 1964, but instead the new Prime Minister Harold Wilson appointed him Chairman of the Parliamentary Labour Party, and during the 1964–1966 Parliament, he worked hard to drum up backbench support for the government, which had a very narrow majority. He was appointed to the Order of the Companions of Honour in the 1965 Birthday Honours. He was vehemently opposed to Wilson's attempt to enter the EEC in 1966, and resigned as Chairman of the Labour Party in 1967.

He got on well both with Field Marshal Bernard Montgomery and with the journalist Sir John Junor.

Shinwell was created a life peer as Baron Shinwell, of Easington in the County of Durham, on 29 June 1970. He later became chair of the All-Party Lords Defence Study Group. In 1973 he published another volume of memoirs, I've Lived through It All. He voted against the Labour Government in 1976. He resigned the Labour Party whip in 1982 in protest at left wing militancy.

== Death ==
In October 1984 Shinwell celebrated his hundredth birthday against the backdrop of the miners' strike. He continued to be active in the House of Lords until shortly before his death. He became the longest-lived peer on 26 March 1986, dying a little over a month later on 8 May, aged 101. He held the record for the second longest-lived British MP (after Theodore Cooke Taylor) until overtaken by Bert Hazell in November 2008. He is one of nine former UK MPs to have become a centenarian.

Shinwell's estate was valued for probate at £271,509 (around £800,000 at 2023 prices).

== Personal life ==
Shinwell was married three times: from 1903 to 1954 to Fay (Fanny) Freeman, by whom he had two sons and a daughter, from 1956 to 1971 to Dinah Meyer, who was Danish, and from 1972 to 1977 to Sarah Sturgo. He outlived all three of his wives. Shinwell's great-niece is the former MP for Liverpool Wavertree, Luciana Berger.

Shinwell sat for sculptor Alan Thornhill for a portrait in clay. The correspondence file relating to the Shinwell portrait bust is held as part of the Thornhill Papers (2006:56) in the archive of the Henry Moore Foundation's Henry Moore Institute in Leeds and the terracotta remains in the collection of the artist. A bronze (accession number S.309) was purchased for the Collection of Glasgow City Art Gallery in 1973.

Shinwell was a lifelong smoker, having smoked tobacco from the age of 13; on many occasions he was seen smoking with his pipe. Shinwell was also an enthusiastic drinker of spirits, particularly whisky.

== Bibliography ==
Shinwell wrote three volumes of autobiography:

- Conflict Without Malice (1955)
- I've Lived Through it All (1973)
- Lead With the Left (1981)

Shinwell wrote "When The Men Come Home" (1944)

Biography:

- Slowe, Peter, "Manny Shinwell" Pluto Press (1993), foreword by Harold Wilson. ISBN 9780745307374

Scholarly studies:

- Robertson Alex J.. The Bleak Midwinter 1947 (Manchester University Press. 1987). pp. x, 207

Book used for citations:

- Campbell, John (1987). Nye Bevan and the Mirage of British Socialism. London: Weidenfeld & Nicolson. ISBN 978-0-297-78998-7.
- Dell, Edmund (1997). The Chancellors: A History of the Chancellors of the Exchequer, 1945-90. London: HarperCollins. ISBN 978-0-006-38418-2.
- Matthew, Colin, ed. (2004). Dictionary of National Biography. Vol. 50. Oxford: Oxford University Press. ISBN 978-0198614111., essay on Shinwell written by Kenneth O. Morgan
- Olson, Lynn (2007). Troublesome Young Men: The Rebels Who Brought Churchill to Power and Helped Save England. Farrar Straus & Giroux. ISBN 9780374179540.
- Rees-Mogg, William (2011). Memoirs. HarperPress. ISBN 978-0-002-57183-8.

== Archives ==
- Catalogue of the Shinwell papers held at LSE Archives

Parliament of the United Kingdom
| Preceded by James Kidd | Member of Parliament for Linlithgowshire; 1922–1924 | Succeeded by James Kidd |
| Preceded by James Kidd | Member of Parliament for Linlithgowshire; 1928–1931 | Succeeded by Adrian Baillie |
| Preceded by Ramsay MacDonald | Member of Parliament for Seaham; 1935–1950 | Constituency abolished |
| New constituency | Member of Parliament for Easington; 1950–1970 | Succeeded by Jack Dormand |
| Preceded by Winston Churchill | Oldest sitting member (nb not Father of the House); 1964–1970 | Succeeded by S. O. Davies |
Political offices
| Preceded by George Lane-Fox | Secretary for Mines; 1924 | Succeeded by George Lane-Fox |
| Preceded by Duff Cooper | Financial Secretary to the War Office; 1929–1930 | Succeeded by William Sanders |
| Preceded by Ben Turner | Secretary for Mines; 1930–1931 | Succeeded by Isaac Foot |
| Preceded by Gwilym Lloyd George | Minister of Fuel and Power; 1945–1947 | Succeeded by Hugh Gaitskell |
| Preceded by Frederick Bellenger | Secretary of State for War; 1947–1950 | Succeeded by John Strachey |
| Preceded by A. V. Alexander | Minister of Defence; 1950–1951 | Succeeded by Winston Churchill |
Party political offices
| Preceded by Hugh Guthrie | Scottish Division representative on the National Administrative Council of the Independent Labour Party; 1920–1923 | Succeeded by Patrick Dollan |
| Preceded by Philip Noel-Baker | Chair of the Labour Party; 1947–1948 | Succeeded by Jim Griffiths |
