= Economy of Swansea =

The City and County of Swansea is an urban centre with a largely rural hinterland in Gower; the city has been described as the regional centre for South West Wales. Swansea's travel to work area, not coterminous with the local authority, also contained the Swansea Valley in 1991; the new 2001-based version merges the Swansea, Neath & Port Talbot, and Llanelli areas into a new Swansea Bay travel to work area. Formerly an industrial centre, most employment in the city is now in the service sector.

== History ==
=== 19th century ===
In the late 18th and early 19th centuries, there were attempts to establish Swansea as a fashionable seaside resort. An engraving of the town in 1818 is described as showing a place which was "distinctly Arcadian, reminiscent of a landscape by Claude sprinkled with civilised Georgian architecture".

However, the growth of the metallurgical industry was to transform the town. The Lower Swansea valley was a favourable area for industrial development because of the proximity of Swansea's port, easy access to coal deposits, and a supply of cheap labour. While lead and zinc were also smelted in west Glamorgan, Swansea's signature industry was copper. The first copper works was built at Landore in 1717. Initially copper ore was imported from Cornwall, Cardiganshire and Ireland, but by the 1820s Swansea was receiving shipments from as far afield as South America, Africa and Australia. The copper industry reached a zenith in the 1880s, when the majority of copper ores imported to Britain were shipped to Swansea and local works employed around 3000 men at any given time.

From the 1870s, tinplate also became a major local industry, pioneered by the Siemens works at Landore. Tinplate production stimulated the further expansion of Swansea port with the opening of the Prince of Wales dock, to be used mainly for tinplate export, in 1882. The location of new tinplate works confirmed the steel industry's increasing preference for coastal sites near ports. However, the Welsh tinplate industry was dependent on exporting to the American market, and suffered serious implications from the imposition of the McKinley tariff in 1890.

=== 20th century ===
By the end of the Second World War the traditional local heavy industries were in decline, and although Swansea Bay emerged as a major centre of the petroleum industry in the 1960s, Swansea shared in the general trend towards a post-industrial, service sector economy. Today, the most important economic sectors in the City and County of Swansea are: public administration, education and health (38.3% of local jobs); distribution, hotels and restaurants (24.2%); and banking, finance and insurance (19.9%). The high proportion of public sector employment is common to Wales as a whole.

== Today ==
=== Major employers ===
Major employers in Swansea include manufacturing facilities operated by 3M UK plc, Alberto-Culver, Bemis, International Rectifier, Morganite Electrical Carbon, and Pure Wafer. Major service sector employers include Admiral Insurance, Electronic Data Systems (EDS), NTL, BT Group, Conduit, Tesco and South West Wales Publications. Large public sector employers include the City and County of Swansea council, Driver and Vehicle Licensing Agency, HM Land Registry, Welsh Government, Department for Work and Pensions, Swansea University, University of Wales Trinity Saint David, and Swansea NHS Trust.

=== Employment ===
In May 2008, 70.7% of Swansea's working-age residents were in employment. The largest single occupational group in Swansea is associate professional & technical occupations (comprising 14.3% of employment), although compared to the Welsh and UK averages the city also has large shares of administrative & secretarial occupations (12.9%) and sales & customer service occupations (11.2%).

Employment in Swansea grew by 14,800 or 16.2% between 2001 and 2006, greater than equivalent increases in Wales and the UK as a whole. However, manufacturing employment in Swansea fell by 2,100 (-25.2%) between 2001 and 2006, a larger fall than recorded in Wales or the UK as a whole.

==== Commuting ====
The city is a centre of net in-commuting, with around 16,100 people making a daily journey outside the authority for work (principally to neighbouring Neath Port Talbot and Carmarthenshire) and 28,300 commuting in (again, mainly from Neath Port Talbot and Carmarthenshire). Swansea is part of the Swansea Bay travel to work area.

=== Income ===
Surveys show that annual full-time gross median earnings for Swansea residents (£21,577) are lower than the UK average. The annual gross median earnings for those who work in Swansea are even lower, only £18,993. Similarly, gross value added (GVA) per head is relatively low in Swansea at £14,302. However, lower earnings and GVA per head do not necessarily signify a major gap in living standards because of differences in the cost of living and transfer payments.

=== City centre ===
Although some surveys place Swansea as the 18th-largest retail centre in the UK – a high placement considering the size of its population – in rankings of shopping attractiveness and competitiveness, Swansea is usually placed outside the top 50, largely because of the low quality of the city centre retail offer.

A peculiarity of Swansea is the lack of employment in the city centre, relative to other towns and cities of similar size. Many major employers have moved to the Enterprise Park or other fringe locations. Only 4,510 office jobs are now located in the city centre, compared to 13,910 in Cardiff. This reduces spend in the city centre economy and underpins the weakness of the local retail sector. Low demand prevents speculative development of new commercial premises, which has created a vicious circle of city centre decline.

In January 2008, developers were appointed to lead the regeneration of several major sites in the city centre and the waterfront. Proposals include 600,000 sq ft (56,000 m^{2}) of additional retail space, 1,000 residential units and new leisure, office, hotel and conference facilities. The regeneration programme will take an estimated 15 years. The Welsh Development Agency (and now the Welsh Government) have been promoting the SA1 Swansea Waterfront development on the edge of the city centre, intended to become a "lively, attractive waterfront destination... using an imaginative mix of land uses". The WDA's Technium concept of incubator space for high technology firms (often spin outs from the local university) was launched at SA1, and additional facilities have now been constructed there and on the university campus. The Assembly and IBM are supporting a new Institute of Life Sciences at the university, which it is hoped will generate more highly skilled, high value-added jobs.

Trend of regional gross value added of Swansea at current basic prices. Figures in millions of British pounds sterling.
| Year | Regional gross value added |
|---|---|
| 1996 | 2,095 |
| 2000 | 2,536 |
| 2005 | 3,238 |
