= Dynamic steady state =

Term from geomorphology

A geomorphological system said to be in dynamic steady state has values that oscillate between maxima and minima around a central mean value.

The flux of sediment from an undisturbed drainage basin changes over the short-term as rainstorms come and go, individual hillslopes fail in mass movements, and riverbanks collapse. Over the long-term, the flux of sediment from a drainage basin oscillates around a mean value, producing a dynamic steady state, unless there are significant changes in boundary conditions such as climate, vegetation cover, or uplift rate.

== Equilibrium ==
The concept of balance, or equilibrium, between landforms and geomorphological processes provides a useful conceptual framework to study the evolution of landscapes, as well as understanding nonequilibrium landforms and landscapes. Often it is useful or convenient to assume that an equilibrium landscape does not change over time – a condition referred to as steady state. Equilibrium however is not static, but rather is a dynamic steady state with landscape characteristics that vary over time around a central tendency. This information suggests that steady state is strongly scale dependent.

== Systems (dynamic v. non-dynamic) ==
Systems can be defined as dynamic or non-dynamic in an equilibrium state. Besides the usual transient condition, where at least one quantity changes with time, stable dynamic systems may be in a steady state condition or equilibrium state where the system is at rest. This special condition is possible after sometime, when all input and output quantities are and remain constant. The relation between input and output quantities for a system in a steady state condition is called “Static Transfer Response of the Dynamic System”. Dynamic systems can be defined as static and transient, while this is seemingly contradictory, this indicates that the system is always a dynamic system, even if it remains momentarily in a steady state condition. The opposite of dynamic is not static but non-dynamic.

== Response time (state changes) ==
When boundary conditions change significantly, geomorphic systems adjust. These adjustments aren't instantaneous, but rather, there is a lag in change, this is the response time. Many geomorphic systems are in steady state with their central tendencies oscillating in equilibrium around a mean value, however, when external factors such as climate or base level change, the system can cross a threshold, and after a certain response time, change to a new and different state in which the system will oscillate around a different mean value.

An example of this condition is deforestation combined with agricultural land conversion, this increases the fluvial sediment flux to a new and higher dynamic steady state because soils are now disturbed by plowing and thus more vulnerable to erosion. In this process, a threshold is crossed and the system will enter a different state which means that the system now oscillates around a different mean value.

== Geomorphic processes in dynamic steady state ==
The average slope of a mountain range remains constant if erosion and rock uplift rates are equal over time, even if individual erosional events greatly change local slopes in short-term. The timescales over which topography equilibrates to changes in landscape-forming processes range from seasonal resurfacing of gravel stream-beds following winter storms to the tens of millions of years it can take to erode mountain ranges.

Over the past 600 million years, Phanerozoic time, the earth has supported a complex population of organisms. The earth has waxed and waned but has remained within the ranges of composition necessary for life to evolve. Because all of the carbon dioxide in the atmosphere is used for photosynthesis by living organisms, it enters and leaves surface ocean waters every few years, and because it is all used in the weathering processes on land every few thousand years, efficient feedback mechanisms must have operated to hold atmospheric carbon dioxide within relatively narrow limits during all environmental changes of the Phanerozoic time. If at any point over this time span the concentration of carbon dioxide had dropped to less than 1/3 of its present value, almost all photosynthesis would have stopped, but the records show that this has not happened. The conclusion that the long-term circulation of materials of the earths surface environment can be regarded as a dynamic system, protected from severe perturbations by effective feedback mechanisms and without major secular trends, seems reasonable..
