= British Seafarers' Union =

Former trade union of the United Kingdom

B.S.U.
- British Seafarers' Union
- Merged into: Amalgamated Marine Workers' Union
- Founded: 6 October 1911
- Dissolved: 1922
- Location: United Kingdom
- Key people: Tommy Lewis, Manny Shinwell.

The British Seafarers' Union (BSU) was a trade union which organised sailors and firemen in the British ports of Southampton and Glasgow between 1911/1912 and 1922. Although of considerable local importance, the organisation remained much smaller and less influential at a national level than the National Sailors' and Firemen's Union, (NSFU).

The BSU was formed in Southampton on 6 October 1911, as a breakaway from the NSFU. In August 1912, a second breakaway took place in Glasgow, and a branch of the BSU was established in that port.

The cause of the split was ostensibly the same in both ports: the rebels claimed that the NSFU was reckless and extravagant with its funds, that members had little control over the direction of the organisation, and that its leading officials were unaccountable. The NSFU itself vigorously denied these allegations. It accused the BSU of sectionalism, and of being the product of the political ambitions of its leading officials, Tommy Lewis and Manny Shinwell.

In June 1912, the BSU took part in the national dock strike of 1912. The NSFU, although affiliated to the body which had called the strike, the National Transport Workers' Federation, refused to support the strike except in London.

Unlike the NSFU, the BSU was not granted a role on the National Maritime Board which was formed in 1917 to decide on working practices in the merchant shipping industry. In May 1921, the Board imposed wage reductions which were resisted by both the BSU and the National Union of Ship's Stewards. Later that year, these two organisations were merged to form the Amalgamated Marine Workers' Union, (AMWU).

== Sources/further reading ==
- Arthur Marsh & Victoria Ryan, The Seamen – a history of the National Union of Seamen, (Oxford, 1989).
- Arthur Marsh & Victoria Ryan, Historical Directory of Trade Unions:Vol 3, (Aldershot, 1987).
- Ken Coates & Tony Topham, The Making of the Labour Movement, (Nottingham, 1994) ISBN 0-85124-565-X
- WB Jones, Bachelor dissertation "The Strike and the Split:The National Sailors' and Firemen’s Union and the British Seafarers' Union in Southampton, 1911-1913"
