= Shipping Federation =

- Merged into: UK Chamber of Shipping
- Formation: 1890
- Dissolved: 1975; 51 years ago
- Type: Trade association
- Legal status: Merged
- Purpose: Coordinate shipping owners interests against dock unions in the United Kingdom
- Location: London, United Kingdom
- Region served: England

The Shipping Federation was a British association of employers in the shipping industry. It was formed in 1890 in response to the London dock strike of 1889 and the successes of the National Union of Seamen and various dockers' unions.

== History ==
The main function of the Federation was to co-ordinate the actions of shipowners so as to counter trade unionism and strike action. Its membership was largely made up of firms operating tramp ships and small vessels.

Most ocean liner firms remained outside the Federation until the 1920s, whilst those in Liverpool did not link up with the Federation until it combined with their own local Employers' Association in 1967.

In 1975 the Shipping Federation combined with the Chamber of Shipping to form the General Council of British Shipping, but reverted to the name UK Chamber of Shipping in 1991.
