= National Maritime Board =

This is about the Maritime Board in the United Kingdom. For the Board in the Philippines, see National Seamen Board.

The National Maritime Board (NMB) was a bilateral board governing wages and working practices in the British shipping industry.

It was founded in November 1917 against a backdrop of strike action amongst seafarers and was originally intended as a purely wartime measure to facilitate wage negotiations in a period of rapid inflation. It built upon the union-employer relationship that had emerged during the war years and brought together representatives of the Shipping Federation, the National Union of Seamen and the National Union of Ship's Stewards, as well as some smaller unions in the industry, but allowing the British Seafarers' Union only local representation. In 1919 the board was re-established as a permanent body and set about establishing national wage rates for all grades, the first time such rates had been enforced. Aylmer Vallance was appointed as the board's General Secretary.

In the 1920s, the board imposed a series of wage reductions with the support of the National Union of Seamen. The Ship's Stewards Union opposed the first of these reductions in 1921, and its members were locked out. At this time, the board also became embroiled in controversies over the policy of Joint Control introduced by the NUS and Shipping Federation. This arrangement aimed to ensure that seafarers could only gain employment if in possession of a form endorsed by both the union and the employers' organisation. It was allegedly widely used to force out of employment members of rival unions, communists, and other 'agitators'.

Later history is unclear: the University of Warwick's Modern Records Centre states that "the records of the Board currently held [...] end in 1985 [...] and it is not known how the organisation continued to operate after this time".
