= Casasola =

Casasola may refer to:

== People ==
- Agustín Casasola (1874–1938), Mexican photographer
- Barbara Casasola (born 1984), Italian fashion designer
- Floss Casasola (1903–1991), Belizean educator
- Marcel-André Casasola Merkle (born 1977), German game designer
- Micaela Casasola (born 1997), Argentine handball player
- Miguel de Poblete Casasola (1602–1667), Roman Catholic prelate
- Roland Casasola (1893–1971), British trade unionist
- Sara Casasola (born 1999), Italian racing cyclist
- Tiago Casasola (born 1995), Argentine footballer

== Locations ==
- Casasola, Italy
- Casasola, Spain

== See also ==
- Casasola Archive
