= 1933 Clay Cross by-election =

UK Parliamentary by-election

The 1933 Clay Cross by-election was held on 1 September 1933. The by-election was held due to the death of the incumbent Labour MP, Charles Duncan.

Unusually, the Constituency Labour Party asked for nominations for the vacancy, and published the list: Percy Barstow of the National Union of Railwaymen, former leader of the party Arthur Henderson, Samuel Sales of the Derbyshire Miners' Association, and Ben Smith, former Member of Parliament for Rotherhithe. Henderson was chosen as the party's candidate, and Herbert Drinkwater acted as his election agent.

Henderson easily won the election. This was Henderson's fifth by-election victory, having previously won in Burnley in 1924, in Newcastle-upon-Tyne East in 1923, in Widnes in 1919, and in Barnard Castle in 1903.

Clay Cross by-election, 1933 Electorate 44,466
Party	Candidate	Votes	%	±%
Labour	Arthur Henderson	21,931	69.3	+4.7
Conservative	John Moores	6,293	19.9	−15.5
Communist	Harry Pollitt	3,434	10.8	New
Majority		15,638	49.4	+20.2
Turnout		31,658	71.2	−3.4
Labour hold		Swing		
