= Bob Garland =

Scottish trade unionist

Robert Baxter Garland (21 March 1920 – 2004) was a Scottish trade unionist.

Born in Glasgow, Garland completed an apprenticeship as an iron moulder, and became an activist in the Amalgamated Union of Foundry Workers (AUFW). He took evening classes with the University of Glasgow before winning a Trades Union Congress scholarship to attend the London School of Economics.

After completing a degree, Garland returned to moulding, now with Harland & Wolff in Govan, where he soon became the works convener. He ran for the general secretaryship of the union in 1954 on an anti-communist platform, but was narrowly defeated, taking 17,694 votes to incumbent Jim Gardner's 18,546. He was elected as the union's full-time national organiser in 1956, but his opponent, F. Bullock, had the vote annulled by the courts on account of outside interference. The vote was re-run, and Garland won again, taking up the position in 1957.

Garland stood again for the general secretaryship in 1961, but lost to David Lambert by a 4,000-vote margin. In 1962, he was sentenced to three months in prison for driving while intoxicated, but this was commuted to a £100 fine after Jim Callaghan argued that he was the best-placed person to advise the Somali government on trade unionism.

In 1967, the AUFW merged with the Amalgamated Engineering Union to form the "Amalgamated Union of Engineering and Foundry Workers", soon renamed that Amalgamated Union of Engineering Workers. A distinct Foundry Section was created, with William Simpson, former general secretary of the AUFW, continuing as general secretary of the Foundry Section. Garland was elected to the section's executive council in 1968, and as president in 1970.

Simpson resigned in 1974 to become chairman of the Health and Safety Commission, and Garland was elected to fill his post, beating a single opponent by 19,000 votes to 12,000, and taking office on 30 December. In 1982, he was made an Officer of the Order of the British Empire. He was elected to the General Council of the Trades Union Congress in 1983, but lost his seat the following year. He also served on the executive of the Confederation of Shipbuilding and Engineering Unions.

In 1984, the Foundry, Construction and Engineering Sections of the union amalgamated under the leadership of a single general secretary, Garland becoming national secretary of a newly-subordinate foundry section. He retired the following year and died in Blackpool, Lancashire, in 2004.

Trade union offices
Preceded by William Simpson	General Secretary of the Amalgamated Union of Engineering Workers (Foundry Section); 1974–1984	Succeeded by Position abolished
Preceded by New position	National Secretary of the Amalgamated Union of Engineering Workers (Foundry Section); 1984–1985	Succeeded by Nigel Harris
