= Roland Casasola =

British trade unionist and political activist

Rowland William Casasola (14 May 1893 – 29 March 1971), known as "Roland", was a British trade unionist and political activist.

Born in Manchester, Casasola completed an apprenticeship as an iron moulder and joined the Friendly Society of Iron Founders in 1912. He served with the Royal Engineers in France during World War I, and during the war was promoted to corporal.

In 1919, Casasola returned to the UK and became active in the Independent Labour Party (ILP) and the Labour Party. He studied with the National Council of Labour Colleges and continued to work as an iron moulder, now in the merged National Union of Foundry Workers.

Casasola was a leading supporter of William Dobbie's unsuccessful candidacy in Stalybridge and Hyde at the 1931 general election and, as a result, was selected as the Labour candidate for the seat at the 1935 general election. He lost and devoted the next few years to supporting the Republicans in the Spanish Civil War, claiming this was the reason he was not selected to fight the 1937 Stalybridge and Hyde by-election. However, he was selected as Prospective Parliamentary Candidate for Bury at the election expected to take place in 1939 or 1940; when this was cancelled due to World War II, he was instead selected for Stockport, which he fought unsuccessfully at the 1945 general election.

In 1946, Casasola was elected to the executive of the new Amalgamated Union of Foundry Workers, and because Jim Gardner, the union's general secretary, was active in the Communist Party of Great Britain (CPGB), Casasola became its representative to Labour Party conferences. This enabled him to gain union funding to contest Manchester Moss Side at the 1950 general election, but he came a distant second, and a final contest at Blackburn West at the 1951 general election was also unsuccessful.

During the early 1950s, Casasola was a prominent opponent of German rearmament, moving an unsuccessful resolution on the subject at the Labour Party conference. In 1954, he was elected as chairman of the Foundry Workers, and in 1956 was elected to the National Executive Committee of the Labour Party. He retired from his posts in 1958, and resigned from the Labour Party in 1961 to join the CPGB.

Trade union offices
Preceded by Archibald McDougall	President of the Amalgamated Union of Foundry Workers; 1954–1958	Succeeded by Fred Hollingsworth
