= David Lambert (trade unionist, born 1922) =

Scottish novelist and trade union leader

David Lambert (1922 – 27 July 1967) was a Scottish novelist and trade union leader.

Lambert worked in Clydebank, completing an apprenticeship, and joining the National Union of Foundry Workers (NUFW). He rapidly became a shop steward then, when only 23, secretary of the union branch. The NUFW became part of the Amalgamated Union of Foundry Workers (AUFW) and in 1951, he went to work in the union's head office as an assistant secretary. While in post, he found time to write two novels based in the area in the 1950s: He Must So Live and No Time For Sleeping.

In 1958, Lambert was elected as assistant general secretary of the union. General secretary Tommy Graham died suddenly in 1960, and Lambert became acting general secretary. In March 1961, he beat Bob Garland in an election to retain the post on a permanent basis.

By 1967, Lambert was suffering from long-term illness and announced his resignation as general secretary. However, he died before it could be effected.

Trade union offices
Preceded by Tommy Graham	General Secretary of the Amalgamated Union of Foundry Workers; 1961 – 1967	Succeeded by William Simpson; General Secretary of the Foundry Section of the Amalgamated Union of Engineering and Foundry Workers
