= Amalgamated Moulders and Kindred Industries Trades Union =

UK trade union

The Amalgamated Moulders and Kindred Industries Trade Union was a trade union representing semi-skilled moulders in the United Kingdom.

The union was founded in 1890 as the Amalgamated Society of Plate and Machine Moulders. It was based in Oldham, and was led by Samuel Howard. In its early years, it worked with the Friendly Society of Iron Founders, both agreeing to respect the others' strikes. However, the moulders remained a small union, and by 1906 it had only 950 members.

The union was one of six founders of the Federation of Moulders and Collateral Trades, in 1906, but the federation achieved little, instead becoming a venue for the competing unions to argue over lines of demarcation and not respecting each other's industrial action. The federation dissolved in 1910, but this led the unions to work together more productively, and from 1912 they negotiated together on pay and conditions.

The union grew more rapidly during World War I, as moulding was increasingly done using machines. By 1918, the union was significant member of the new National Federation of Foundry Trades. The National Union of Foundry Workers (NUFW) repeatedly encouraged the moulders union to merge into it, but this did not occur. In 1966, it finally joined the successor to the NUFW, the Amalgamated Union of Foundry Workers, at which time it had about 2,000 members.
