= Archibald Logan (trade unionist) =

Scottish trade unionist and politician

Archibald G. Logan (died 11 July 1949) was a Scottish trade unionist and politician.

Logan worked as an iron moulder in Falkirk. In 1888, he took part in a strike for increased wages. Following the action, the strikers formed the Central Ironmoulders' Association, and Logan was elected to its first committee. The union grew quickly, and in 1904 he led a delegation to investigate working conditions in the light castings trade in England. Workers in England began joining the union, and in 1906 Logan was posted to England to organise those branches.

In 1908, Logan requested one weekend a month off, to visit his family, but the union's executive committee rejected this. Logan resigned, but was reappointed in March 1909, with the requested time off agreed. He later returned to Scotland, and became the union's treasurer, working closely with general secretary Hugh Murdoch.

Logan was active in the Labour Party, winning election to Falkirk Town Council, and served as term as the town's provost. At the 1918 UK general election, Logan stood in Stirling and Falkirk, sponsored by his union. Against a single opponent, he took 35.7% of the vote.

Logan continued working for his union until 1946, when it became part of the new National Union of Foundry Workers. He was one of three union employees to transfer over to the new union, but he died three years later.
