= Amalgamated Society of Core Makers of Great Britain and Ireland =

UK trade union

The Amalgamated Society of Core Makers of Great Britain and Ireland (ASC) was a trade union representing foundry workers in the United Kingdom.

The union was founded in 1902 by a large number of local unions, with a total membership of less than 1,000. About half the members came from the Manchester and District Coremakers' Society, the largest of the local unions. Despite its small membership, the union employed a full-time general secretary, Edmund Clegg, who was able to increase membership to 1,400 by 1910. The union focused on paying benefits to members who were not working, and avoided industrial action.

In 1906, the union was a founder of the Federation of Moulders and Collateral Trades, although this soon collapsed. It continued alone until 1920, growing to over 4,000 members, when it merged with the Associated Iron Moulders of Scotland and the Friendly Society of Ironfounders to form the National Union of Foundry Workers.
