= Daniel Guile =

British trade unionist (1814–1882)

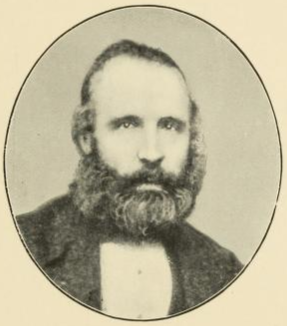
Guile, while leader of the FSIF

Daniel Guile (21 October 1814 – 7 December 1882) was a British trade unionist.

Born in Liverpool, Guile was the son of William and Elizabeth. His father worked as a shoemaker but struggled to find work during the mid-1820s. Daniel, therefore, left school when he was twelve and began working in an iron foundry. He completed an apprenticeship as an iron moulder, became a journeyman, and immediately joined the Friendly Society of Iron Founders (FSIF), a path soon followed by John, his younger brother.

Guile married Elizabeth Billsberry in 1835, and the couple had nine or more children. In 1847, he gave up alcohol and began campaigning for temperance and, in particular, for public houses to be closed on Sundays. Unlike most workers, Guile was able to vote in Parliamentary elections, as he inherited freeman status. This inspired him to speak at public meetings in support of the Liberal Party and help form a branch of the National Association for the Promotion of Social Science.

By 1860, John was secretary of the Liverpool branch of the FSIF, and Daniel succeeded him in 1862. The following year, there was concern that a branch had mismanaged its welfare fund, but Guile skilfully chaired a national meeting which resolved the matter. In July, Guile stood for the post of corresponding secretary - the most senior position in the union - and was easily elected, with over 3,400 votes and a majority of around 3,200. This was a full-time role, and Guile moved to London to run the union.

In London, Guile immediately began speaking on matters of interest to unions, including calling for the repeal of the Master and Servant Act. Under his leadership, the union affiliated to the London Trades Council, but Guile objected to its refusal to support iron workers on an unofficial strike in Staffordshire. Along with George Potter, he was a founder of the rival London Working Men's Association. The late 1860s saw a recession, and Guile lent the union all his savings, in order to ensure its survival.

The Hornby vs Close case found that unions could not prosecute membership who stole their funds, and in order to campaign on this issue, Guile again began working with the leading figures in the Trades Council, becoming recognised as part of the "Junta". He also became involved with the Trades Union Congress (TUC), winning election to its Parliamentary Committee in 1873, then becoming its treasurer, but stood down in September 1875, arguing that with the passing of the Conspiracy, and Protection of Property Act 1875, the organisation was no longer needed.

Guile remained a member of a large number of campaigns, including the Labour Representation League, National Education League, Working Men's Committee for the Separation of Church and State, Working Men's Emigration League, and the Workmen's Peace Association. He also remained active in the Liberal Party, seconding one of its candidates in Southwark at the 1880 UK general election. By this time, he was suffering from poor health connected with his stomach. He resigned as secretary of the union in January 1882, and died at the end of the year.

Trade union offices
Preceded by William Harvey	Corresponding Secretary of the Friendly Society of Iron Founders; 1863–1882	Succeeded by Edward Woods
Preceded by William Allan	Treasurer of the Trades Union Congress; 1873–1875	Succeeded by George Shipton
