= National Union of Foundry Workers =

British trade union

- Merged into: Amalgamated Union of Foundry Workers
- Founded: 1920
- Dissolved: 1946
- Headquarters: 164 Chorlton Road, Manchester
- Location: United Kingdom
- Members: 34,665 (1940)
- Affiliations: TUC, CSEU, Labour

The National Union of Foundry Workers (NUFW) was a trade union representing workers in foundries in the United Kingdom.

== History ==
The union was founded in 1920 with the merger of the Associated Iron Moulders of Scotland, the Amalgamated Society of Coremakers of Great Britain and Ireland and the Friendly Society of Iron Founders of England, Ireland and Wales. The Scottish Brassmoulders' Union joined in 1942, and the Associated Iron, Steel and Brass Dressers of Scotland merged in during 1945. In 1946, the union merged with the Ironfounding Workers' Association and the United Metal Founders' Society to form the Amalgamated Union of Foundry Workers.

Although many women worked in foundries during and after World War II, the NUFW only admitted men into its membership.

== Election results ==
The union sponsored Arthur Henderson as a Labour Party candidate in several Parliamentary elections.

Election	Constituency	Candidate	Votes	Percentage	Position
1922 general election	Widnes	Arthur Henderson	12,897	46.8	2
1923 by-election	Newcastle upon Tyne East	Arthur Henderson	11,066	45.7	1
1923 general election	Newcastle upon Tyne East	Arthur Henderson	11,532	47.7	2
1924 by-election	Burnley	Arthur Henderson	24,571	58.4	1
1924 general election	Burnley	Arthur Henderson	20,549	45.4	1
1929 general election	Burnley	Arthur Henderson	28,091	46.2	1
1931 general election	Burnley	Arthur Henderson	26,917	43.0	2
1933 by-election	Clay Cross	Arthur Henderson	21,931	69.3	1

== Leadership ==
=== General Secretaries ===
1920: Alfred Todd
1922: James Fulton
1925: Robert Tilling
1934: J. H. Codd
1938: Albert Wilkie
1944: Jim Gardner

=== Presidents ===
1920: Tom Chadwick

=== Assistant General Secretaries ===
1920: James Fulton
1922: Robert Tilling
1925: J. H. Codd
1934: Robert Smith
