= John Cullen (chemical engineer) =

British chemical engineer

Sir Edward John Cullen (29 October 1926 – 14 January 2018) was a British chemical engineer who was head of the UK Health and Safety Commission and received a knighthood for services to health and safety.

== Life and education ==
Cullen was born in October 1926 in Bury St Edmunds and attended Culford School. After service in the RAF he went to Emmanuel College, Cambridge in 1948, graduating in chemical engineering in 1952, followed by a master's degree in the same subject at the University of Texas as a Fulbright Scholar, returning to Cambridge to do a PhD in gas absorption. He married Betty Hopkins in 1954, and they had four children. He died 14 January 2018.

== Career ==
Cullen joined the research department of the United Kingdom Atomic Energy Authority in 1956, moving to ICI, Billingham as a chemical plant manager, where he remained for three years before going to New York as technical liaison for ICI. He returned to the UK in 1963 to oversee the building of the refinery on Teesside as a joint venture between ICI and Phillips Petroleum. From 1967 to 1983 he joined the US company Rohm & Haas finishing as managing director of Rohm & Haas UK.

He had been particularly involved is safety at ICI and from 1979 was European Director of Rohm & Haas, responsible for engineering, regulatory affairs, health, safety and the environment. This led to him becoming Deputy Chairman of the Chemical Industry Safety, Health & Environment Committee of the Chemical Industries Association and to being Chairman of Health & Safety Commission from 1983 until his retirement in 1993. During this office he was responsible for overseeing the major hazards legislation COMAH and the occupational health legislation COSHH as well as dealing with major incidents such as the Piper Alpha, King's Cross fire and Clapham Junction rail crash.

== Honours ==
Cullen was a Fellow of the Institution of Chemical Engineers, and its President 1988–9. He was also a Fellow of the Royal Academy of Engineering. He was president of the Pipeline Industries Guild from 1996 to 1998. In 1993 he was awarded an honorary doctorate (DSc) by the University of Exeter. He received a knighthood (Knight Bachelor) in the 1991 Birthday Honours.

Government offices
Preceded by William Simpson	Chairman of the Health and Safety Commission; 1983–1993	Succeeded by Frank Davies
