= Ironfounding Workers' Association =

Former trade union of the United Kingdom

The Ironfounding Workers' Association was a trade union representing foundry workers in the United Kingdom, principally in Scotland.

== History ==
In 1888, there was a strike in Falkirk of un-unionised light casting moulders. The strike was successful in obtaining a 5% pay rise, but many of its leaders were blacklisted. They decided to form the Central Ironmoulders' Association of Scotland, established in April 1889 and initially having 256 members. By the end of the year, it had five branches around Scotland, and 740 members. Its leaders supported the new unionism approach, with low membership fees and very limited financial benefits for members, but instead a focus on campaigning for better pay and conditions at work.

Hugh Lyon became shop steward at the Carron Iron Works in Falkirk, where the union only had 12 members. He eventually recruited all 500 workers at the plant. In part due to Lyon's work, the union grew steadily, reaching 3,150 members in 1900. In 1906, it began recruiting in England, and by 1914 it had 6,500 members. To better reflect its membership, in 1926 it was renamed as the "Ironfounding Workers' Association". In 1946, it merged with the National Union of Foundry Workers and the United Metal Founders' Society to form the Amalgamated Union of Foundry Workers.

== Election results ==
The union sponsored a Labour Party candidate at the 1918 UK general election:

Constituency	Candidate	Votes	%	Position
Stirling and Falkirk	Archibald Logan	5,201	35.7	2

== General Secretaries ==
1888: John Waddell
1897: Hugh Murdoch
