= William Walker, 1st Baron Wavertree =

British politician (1856–1933)

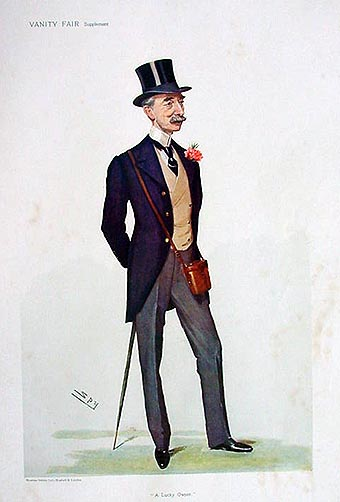
"A Lucky Owner" William Walker as caricatured by Spy (Leslie Ward) in Vanity Fair, June 1906

William Hall Walker, 1st Baron Wavertree DL (25 December 1856 – 2 February 1933) was a British businessman, Conservative Party politician, art collector, and an important figure in thoroughbred racehorse breeding.

== Background ==
Walker was a younger son of Sir Andrew Barclay Walker, 1st Baronet and his wife Eliza Reid of Limekilns, Fife. Walker's father was a wealthy brewer who was born in Ayrshire and expanded the family business into England, moving to Gateacre, Liverpool. Walker's older brother John Reid Walker was also a racehorse breeder. After attending Harrow School, Walker went into the family brewery business in Liverpool.

== Thoroughbred horse racing ==
Walker was a polo player and in 1895 built stables near Liverpool for his polo ponies at what is now housing known as Grange Mews. The following year he built cottages for his married grooms and named them Soarer Cottages after his horse, The Soarer, who won the 1896 Grand National. In 1900 he used the proceeds of The Soarer's Grand National victory to purchase the Tully estate near Kildare in Ireland for a stud. Tully-bred horses included the 1906 Epsom Derby winner, Minoru; the 1911 St Leger winner, Prince Palatine; two winners of the 1000 Guineas and an Ascot Gold Cup winner. Walker introduced the Aga Khan to English racing. Between 1906 and 1910, Walker created a Japanese garden at Tully, having brought a horticulturist from Japan for the purpose.

In late 1915, Walker offered to sell Tully to the British Government and to include his bloodstock as a gift in order to establish a national stud. The British Government paid Walker £47,625 for the stud and received as a gift six stallions, 43 brood mares, 29 yearlings and two-year-olds, and 300 shorthorn cattle. In 1943, the newly formed Irish Government bought the property and the Irish National Stud Company Ltd. was formed. Currently, the Irish National Stud property consists of 958 acres (3.88 km^{2}) and is home to some of Ireland's leading stallions. The bloodstock were moved to England and became the basis of The National Stud of the United Kingdom, now located in Newmarket. Wavertree House at the National Stud and the Wavertree Charitable Trust are named in Walker's memory.

In 1999, Racing Post ranked Walker at number 24 on its list of Top 100 Makers of 20th Century Horse Racing.

== Art collection ==
Although not an art collector, Walker's father donated the Walker Art Gallery to the city of Liverpool. Walker acquired a substantial collection of his own, among them the painting View of Killarney with the Passage to the Upper Lake by William Ashford, one of Ireland's leading landscape artists. In 1933, he bequeathed the Walker Art Gallery a sizeable part of his paintings collection plus £20,000 to help the museum with its renovations. In addition, he donated a number of paintings from his collection of sporting art to The National Stud. The paintings are now displayed in the Jockey Club in Newmarket.

== Politics and the Peerage ==
In 1900, Walker was elected as the Member of Parliament (MP) for Widnes. He served until resigning on 18 August 1919. On 27 October 1919 he was raised to the peerage as Baron Wavertree, of Delamere in the County of Chester. On his death in 1933, the barony became extinct. He was also appointed a deputy lieutenant of the County of Lancashire on 15 June 1910. This gave him the Post Nominal Letters "DL" for Life. He held the appointment until the Mandatory retirement age of 75 on 25 December 1931 at which point he was transferred to the retired list.

In his honor, the Lord Wavertree Cup is offered in English FA football (By way of the Liverpool County Premier League). His widow, Sophie, (who he married in 1896) a direct descendant of the playwright Richard Brinsley Sheridan, was also an avid sports person who sponsored lawn tennis tournaments and offered the International Tennis Federation a trophy that was declined but later was initiated as the Davis Cup.

He died in London on 2 February 1933. William was buried with his parents at the family plot in All Saints Churchyard, Childwall, Liverpool.

Parliament of the United Kingdom
Preceded by John Saunders Gilliat	Member of Parliament for Widnes; 1900–1919	Succeeded by Arthur Henderson
Peerage of the United Kingdom
New creation	Baron Wavertree; 1919–1933	Extinct
