= James Fulton (trade unionist) =

Scottish trade unionist

James Fulton (1868 – May 1925) was a Scottish trade unionist.

Born in Glasgow, Fulton worked as an iron moulder, joining the Associated Iron Moulders of Scotland (AIMS) union, and also the Independent Labour Party. He was elected to the union's executive council, and by the early 1910s was its vice-chair.

In 1913, Fulton was elected as one of three assistant secretaries of AIMS, alongside John Whyte and Robert Smith, with a remit to focus on the new benefits scheme administered by the union. He proved successful, and in August 1918 he was elected as general secretary of the union. He worked closely with the union's president, Tom Bell, and supported the Clyde Workers' Committee, giving strike pay to its members who took industrial action.

With the end of World War I, employment in the foundries declined, and the union's membership fell. In 1920, AIMS merged with several other unions, to form the National Union of Foundry Workers. Fulton was elected as the union's assistant general secretary, then in 1922 he won election as general secretary. Given the difficult position of the union, he stated that "I do not know whether congratulations or sympathies are most appropriate to anyone elected to the General Secretaryship of a Trade Union at the present time". The CWS Bank extended credit to the union, the journal was put out quarterly rather than monthly, and the union proposed higher contributions and lower benefits to members. This stabilised the union's finances, although membership continued to fall.

Fulton became ill in 1925, but kept his condition secret until his death in May.

Trade union offices
Preceded by John Brown	General Secretary of the Associated Iron Moulders of Scotland; 1918–1920	Succeeded by Union merged
Preceded by New position	Assistant General Secretary of the National Union of Foundry Workers; 1920–1922	Succeeded by Robert Tilling
Preceded by Alfred Todd	General Secretary of the National Union of Foundry Workers; 1922–1925	Succeeded by Robert Tilling
