= Herbert Vincent Mills =

British socialist activist

Herbert Vincent Mills (1856–1928) was a British socialist activist.

== Early life ==
Born in Accrington, Mills undertook an apprenticeship as an engineer, but then trained to become a Unitarian minister. In 1884, he became the minister of the Hamilton Road Chapel in Liverpool, then in 1887 he moved to the Market Place Chapel in Kendal.

== Later life ==
He became known across Britain as a radical campaigner for reform of the poor laws, and for resettlement of the land. In 1886, arguing that mechanisation inevitably reduced demand for labour, and by creating unemployment it then reduced the market for goods, in a vicious cycle that could not be solved by existing Poor Law institutions. For Mills, the workhouse encouraged anything but work: on the contrary, he was impressed by 'the extraordinary amount of yawning that goes on' even in the best-managed institutions, by the useless imposition of such tasks as oakum-picking and stone-breaking, and by the disdain with which officials treated the poor. For positive solutions, Mills looked to the independent-minded islanders of St Kilda, and the vagrancy colonies of the Netherlands, concluding that what was required was an “English experiment” in co-operative land settlement. He created the Home Colonisation Society (HCS) in the following year to pursue his ideas.

Mills was taken seriously enough to be invited to give evidence in 1888 to the House of Lords Select Committee on the Poor Laws, calling on the government to set up a series of land colonies, on which urban workers would learn to live by practicing their skills and trading with one another. In 1892, the HCS bought a small farm at Starnthwaite, near Kendal, and by 1893 some 22 settlers were living and working on the estate. However, some of the colonists disagreed with Mills on the aims and government of the colony, and fourteen were expelled. The dissidents included Dan Irving, later a Labour MP, and the Bristol socialist and feminist Enid Stacey. After further disappointments, Mills abandoned the project, handing over the land in 1900 to the Christian Union for Social Service. For many British socialists, Starnthwaite became a symbol of the impracticability of land settlement for the urban working class.

During the 1890s, Mills also served on Westmorland County Council as a Liberal-Labour representative.

== See also ==
- Dan Irving
