= 1896 Grand National =

English steeplechase horse race

- Grand National
- Location: Aintree
- Date: 27 March 1896
- Winning horse: The Soarer
- Starting price: 40/1
- Jockey: (Scotland) Mr David Campbell
- Trainer: Willie Moore
- Owner: (Scotland) William Hall Walker
- Conditions: Good to soft (soft in places)

The 1896 Grand National was the 58th renewal of the Grand National horse race that took place at Aintree near Liverpool, England, on 27 March 1896.

Winning jockey David Campbell owned The Soarer until a few weeks before the race when he sold him to Walker.

== Finishing Order ==
Position	Name	Jockey	Age	Handicap (st-lb)	SP	Distance
01	The Soarer	Mr David Campbell	7	9-13	40-1	1.5 Lengths
02	Father O'Flynn	Mr C Grenfell	11	10-12	40-1	
03	Biscuit	Matthews	8	10-0	25-1	
04	Barcalwhey	Charles Hogan	6	9-8	33-1	
05	Why Not	Arthur Nightingall	15	11-5	100-7	
06	Rory O'More	Bob Nightingall	6	10-9	7-1	
07	Kestrel	H Smith	9	9-10	100-1	
08	Cathal	Reginald Ward	7	11-13	100-9	
09	Van Der Berg	George Mawson	9	10-9	20-1	Last to compete

== Non-finishers ==
Fence	Name	Jockey	Age	Handicap (st-lb)	SP	Fate
05	Wild Man From Borneo	Mr Tom Widger	8	12-0	40-1	Fell
15	March Hare	Richard Chaloner	?	11-7	100-6	Ran Out
18	The Midshipmite	Hewitt	?	11-4	66-1	Fell
01	Manifesto	John Gourley	?	11-4	100-7	Fell
	Moriarty	Ernest Acres	?	11-2	40-1	
25	Ardcarn	George Williamson	9	11-1	8-1	Fell
23	Waterford	Mr Joe Widger	?	10-13	100-12	Knocked Over
23	Swanshot	Algy Anthony	?	10-13	20-1	Fell
01	Redhill	Mr GS Davies	?	10-12	25-1	Knocked Over
	Dollar II	Billy Halsey	?	10-11	50-1	
08	St. Anthony	Capt Wilfred Ricardo	?	10-10	100-1	Fell
	Alpheus	Arthur Gordon	?	10-10	20-1	
09	Emin	H Brown	?	10-8	50-1	Knocked Over
18	Fleetwing	Mr Parsons	?	10-6	100-1	Pulled Up
	Clawson	Billy Bissill	?	10-4	66-1	
23	Miss Baron	Terry Kavanagh	?	10-0	66-1	Knocked Over
19	Philactery	Edmund Driscoll	?	9-11	100-1	Pulled Up
	Westmeath	George Morris	?	9-7	100-1	
24	Caustic	H Mason	?	9-7	100-7	Fell
