= William Simpson (trade unionist) =

Scottish political activist and unionist (1920 - 2001)

Sir William James Simpson (20 May 1920 – November 2001), often known as Bill Simpson, was a Scottish trade unionist and political activist.

Simpson grew up in Falkirk and attended Falkirk Technical School before becoming an apprentice moulder. During World War II, he served with the Argyll and Sutherland Highlanders, but he returned to his trade at the end of the war. Becoming active in the Amalgamated Union of Foundry Workers (NUFW), he was elected to its council in 1955.

At the start of 1968, the NUFW merged with the Amalgamated Engineering Union, to form the Amalgamated Union of Engineering Workers. Simpson was appointed as General Secretary of its foundry section, serving until 1975. In 1972/3, he also served as Chair of the Labour Party.

Simpson had a keen interest in health and safety at work, in part because he had to take a year off to recover from a serious accident. He was the Chairman of the Health and Safety Commission from 1974 to 1983, and also served as Chairman of the Advisory Committee on Asbestos from 1976 until 1979. In 1984, he was knighted.

Party political offices
Preceded by Tony Benn	Chairman of the Labour Party; 1972–1973	Succeeded by James Callaghan
Trade union offices
Preceded by New position	General Secretary of the Amalgamated Union of Engineering Workers (Foundry Section); 1968–1974	Succeeded by Bob Garland
Government offices
Preceded by New position	Chairman of the Health and Safety Commission; 1974–1983	Succeeded by John Cullen
