= Amalgamated Union of Foundry Workers =

British trade union

- Merged into: Amalgamated Union of Engineering and Foundry Workers
- Founded: 1946
- Dissolved: 31 December 1967
- Headquarters: 164 Chorlton Road, Manchester
- Location: United Kingdom
- Members: 72,000 (1967)
- Affiliations: TUC, ITUC, CSEU, Labour

The Amalgamated Union of Foundry Workers (AUFW) was a trade union representing workers in foundries in the United Kingdom.

The union was founded in 1946 with the merger of the National Union of Foundry Workers, the Ironfounding Workers' Association and the United Metal Founders' Society. In 1962, the North of England Brass, Aluminium, Bronze and Kindred Alloys Moulders' Trade and Friendly Society merged into the AUF, and the Amalgamated Moulders and Kindred Industries Trades Union joined in 1967. Later that year, the union merged with the Amalgamated Engineering Union to form the Amalgamated Union of Engineering and Foundry Workers, acting as the foundry section of the new union. At this point, the union had around 72,000 members.

== Election results ==
The union sponsored Roland Casasola as a Labour Party candidate in two Parliamentary elections.

Election	Constituency	Candidate	Votes	Percentage	Position
1950 general election	Manchester Moss Side	Roland Casasola	16,769	37.5	2
1951 general election	Blackburn West	Roland Casasola	16,996	46.3	2

== Leadership ==
=== General Secretaries ===
1946: Jim Gardner
1958: Tommy Graham
1960: David Lambert

=== Presidents ===
1946: Bill Wallace
1947: Archibald MacDougall
1954: Roland Casasola
1958: Fred Hollingsworth

=== Assistant General Secretaries ===
1946: Tom Colvin
1958: Tommy Graham
1958: David Lambert
1960:
