= Jim Gardner (trade unionist) =

Scottish trade unionist (1893–1976)

Jim Gardner (3 August 1893 – 20 July 1976) was a Scottish trade union leader.

Born near Glasgow in 1893, he worked in a brass foundry at age 14. Two years later, he joined the Associated Iron Moulders of Scotland trade union. He soon began his political involvement by joining the Independent Labour Party (ILP), where he was an active member during World War I. He then joined the Communist Party of Great Britain (CPGB) after its formation in 1920.

The Associated Iron Moulders eventually became part of the National Union of Foundry Workers, and Gardner was elected as its Scottish district secretary in 1941. He stood in the 1943 election to become general secretary of the Foundry Workers, and narrowly lost to the incombent Albert Wilkie by less than a thousand votes. During World War II, Gardner was also serving on the Petroleum Board.

In 1944, Wilkie died and Gardner stood again for the Foundry Workers general secretary post, this time beating Tom Colvin in another close vote. Gardner led the union into a merger in 1946 which formed the Amalgamated Union of Foundry Workers. He was general secretary of the new union, which had an estimated 80,000 members, until his retirement in 1958. During his tenure, he was known for his focus on health and safety issues. In the 1950s, Gardner served on the executive of the CPGB.

Trade union offices
| Preceded by Albert Wilkie | General Secretary of the National Union of Foundry Workers; 1944 – 1946 | Succeeded by Position abolished |
| Preceded by New position | General Secretary of the Amalgamated Union of Foundry Workers; 1946 – 1958 | Succeeded by Tommy Graham |
