= Arthur Henderson =

British iron moulder, Labour politician and Nobel laureate (1863–1935)

The Right Honourable Arthur Henderson
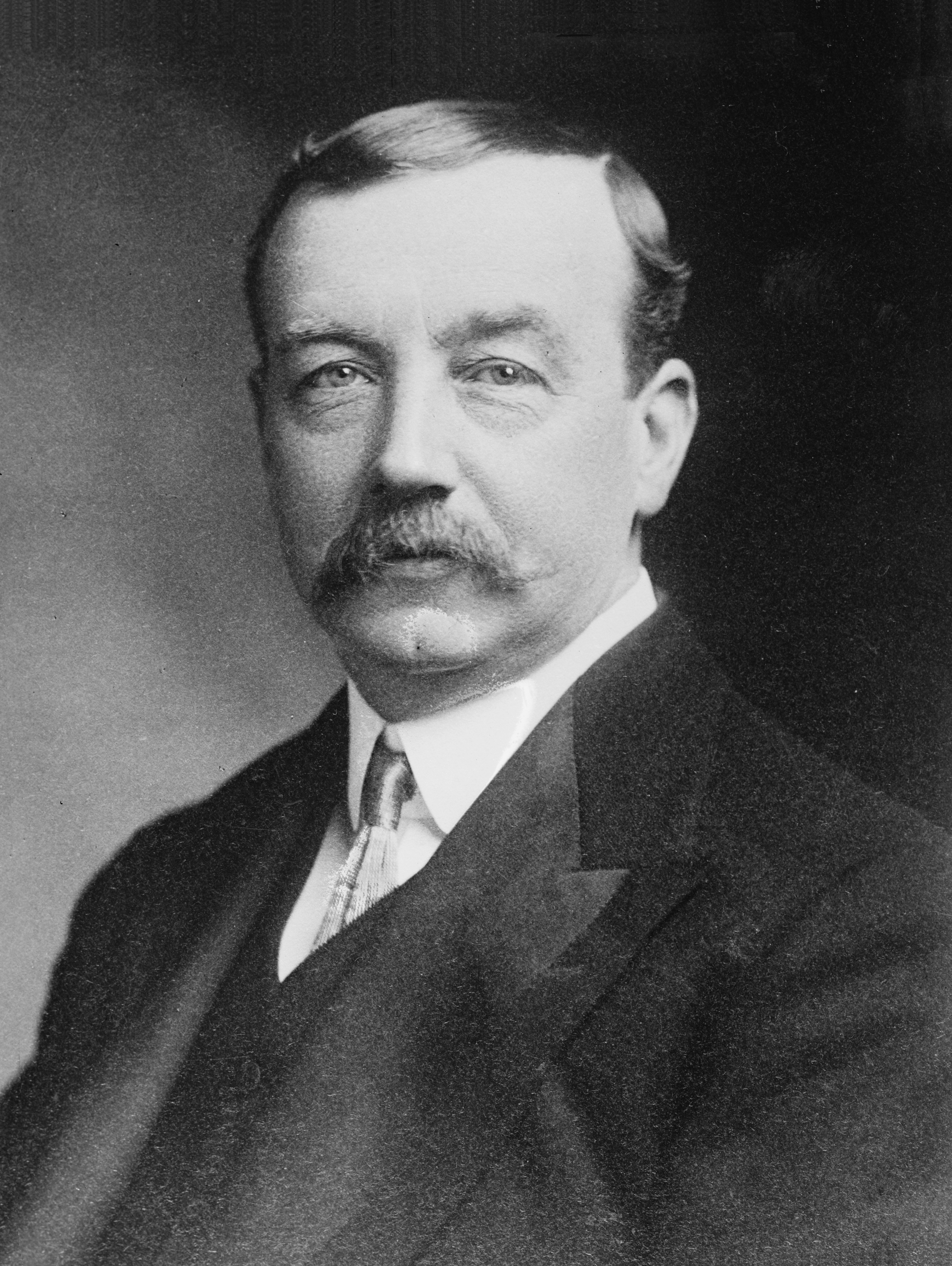
- Henderson c. 1910–15

Leader of the Opposition
- In office 28 August 1931 – 27 October 1931
- Monarch: George V
- Prime Minister: Ramsay MacDonald
- Deputy: J. R. Clynes
- Preceded by: Stanley Baldwin
- Succeeded by: George Lansbury

Leader of the Labour Party
- In office 28 August 1931 – 25 October 1932
- Deputy: J. R. Clynes
- Preceded by: Ramsay MacDonald
- Succeeded by: George Lansbury
- In office 5 August 1914 – 24 October 1917
- Deputy: Alfred Henry Gill; John Hodge
- Preceded by: Ramsay MacDonald
- Succeeded by: William Adamson
- In office 28 January 1908 – 14 February 1910
- Deputy: George Barnes
- Preceded by: Keir Hardie
- Succeeded by: George Barnes
Ministerial offices
Foreign Secretary
In office 7 June 1929 – 24 August 1931
Prime Minister	Ramsay MacDonald
Preceded by	Austen Chamberlain
Succeeded by	The Marquess of Reading
Home Secretary
In office 23 January 1924 – 4 November 1924
Prime Minister	Ramsay MacDonald
Preceded by	William Bridgeman
Succeeded by	Sir William Joynson-Hicks
Minister without portfolio
In office 10 December 1916 – 12 August 1917
Prime Minister	David Lloyd George
Preceded by	The Marquess of Lansdowne
Succeeded by	George Nicoll Barnes
Paymaster General
In office 18 August 1916 – 10 December 1916
Prime Minister	H. H. Asquith
Preceded by	Thomas Legh
Succeeded by	Joseph Compton-Rickett
President of the Board of Education
In office 25 May 1915 – 18 August 1916
Prime Minister	H. H. Asquith
Preceded by	Jack Pease
Succeeded by	Robert Crewe-Milnes
Shadow Cabinet posts
Opposition Chief Whip of the House of Commons
In office 10 March 1925 – 10 February 1927
Leader	Ramsay MacDonald
Preceded by	Ben Spoor
Succeeded by	Tom Kennedy
In office 15 November 1922 – 6 December 1923
Leader	J. R. Clynes; Ramsay MacDonald
Preceded by	George Thorne
Succeeded by	Ben Spoor
Party political offices
Chief Whip of the Labour Party
In office 10 March 1925 – 10 February 1927
Leader	Ramsay MacDonald
Preceded by	Ben Spoor
Succeeded by	Tom Kennedy
In office 14 February 1921 – 6 December 1923
Leader	J. R. Clynes; Ramsay MacDonald
Preceded by	William Wilson
Succeeded by	Ben Spoor
In office 9 February 1914 – 5 August 1914
Leader	Ramsay MacDonald
Preceded by	George Roberts
Succeeded by	Frank Goldstone
In office 8 February 1906 – 28 January 1908
Leader	Keir Hardie
Preceded by	David Shackleton
Succeeded by	George Roberts
Member of Parliament
Member of Parliament for Clay Cross
In office 1 September 1933 – 20 October 1935
Preceded by	Charles Duncan
Succeeded by	Alfred Holland
Member of Parliament for Burnley
In office 28 February 1924 – 7 October 1931
Preceded by	Dan Irving
Succeeded by	Gordon Campbell
Member of Parliament for Newcastle upon Tyne East
In office 17 January 1923 – 16 November 1923
Preceded by	Joseph Nicholas Bell
Succeeded by	Sir Robert Aske
Member of Parliament for Widnes
In office 12 September 1919 – 26 October 1922
Preceded by	William Hall Walker
Succeeded by	George Christopher Clayton
Member of Parliament for Barnard Castle
In office 30 August 1903 – 25 November 1918
Preceded by	Sir Joseph Pease
Succeeded by	John Edmund Swan

Personal details
- Born: 13 September 1863 Glasgow, Scotland
- Died: 20 October 1935 (aged 72) London, England
- Party: Labour

Arthur Henderson (13 September 1863 – 20 October 1935) was a British iron moulder and Labour politician. He was the first Labour cabinet minister, won the Nobel Peace Prize in 1934 and, uniquely, served three separate terms as Leader of the Labour Party in three different decades, and was elected to parliament in five by-elections in different constituencies. He was popular among his colleagues, who called him "Uncle Arthur" in acknowledgement of his integrity, his devotion to the cause and his imperturbability. He was a transitional figure whose policies were, at first, close to those of the Liberal Party. The trades unions rejected his emphasis on arbitration and conciliation, and thwarted his goal of unifying the Labour Party and the trade unions.

== Early life ==
Arthur Henderson was born at 10 Paterson Street, Anderston, Glasgow, Scotland, in 1863, the son of Agnes, a domestic servant, and David Henderson, a textile worker who died when Arthur was ten years old. After his father's death, the Hendersons moved to Newcastle upon Tyne in the North-East of England, where Agnes later married Robert Heath.

Henderson worked at Robert Stephenson and Sons' General Foundry Works from the age of twelve. After finishing his apprenticeship there aged seventeen, he moved to Southampton for a year and then returned to work as an iron moulder (a type of foundryman) in Newcastle upon Tyne.

Henderson became a Wesleyan Methodist in 1879, having previously been a Congregationalist, and became a Methodist local preacher. After losing his job in 1884, he concentrated on preaching.

== Union leader and Liberal Party activist ==
In 1892, Henderson entered the complex world of trade union politics when he was elected as a paid organiser for the Friendly Society of Iron Founders. He also became a representative on the North East Conciliation Board. Henderson believed that strikes caused more harm than they were worth and tried to avoid them whenever he could. For this reason, he opposed the formation of the General Federation of Trade Unions, as he was convinced that it would lead to more strikes. In 1893 he also became active in politics, becoming a local Councillor on Newcastle City Council for the Liberal Party. In 1896 he served as the election agent for Sir Joseph Pease, Liberal Party MP for Barnard Castle, County Durham.

== The Labour Representation Committee ==
In 1900 Henderson was one of the 129 trade union and socialist delegates who passed Keir Hardie's motion to create the Labour Representation Committee (LRC). In 1903, Henderson was elected Treasurer of the LRC and was also elected as Member of Parliament (MP) for Barnard Castle at a by-election. From 1903 to 1904, Henderson also served as mayor of Darlington, County Durham.

== The Labour Party ==
Henderson (on left) in 1906, with other leading figures in the new Labour Party

In 1906, the LRC changed its name to the Labour Party after it won 29 seats at the general election. In 1908, when Hardie resigned as Leader of the Labour Party, Henderson was elected to replace him. He remained Leader until his own resignation two years later, in 1910.

== Cabinet Minister ==
In 1914 the First World War broke out and Ramsay MacDonald resigned from the Leadership of the Labour Party in protest. Henderson was elected to replace him. The two became enemies.

In 1915, following Prime Minister H. H. Asquith's decision to create a coalition government, Henderson became the first member of the Labour Party to become a member of the Cabinet, as President of the Board of Education. In this capacity he proposed the foundation of the Department of Scientific and Industrial Research.

In 1916, David Lloyd George forced Asquith to resign and replaced him as Prime Minister. Henderson became a member of the small War Cabinet with the post of Minister without Portfolio on 9 December 1916. The other Labour representatives who joined Henderson in Lloyd George's coalition government were John Hodge, who became Minister of Labour, and George Barnes, who became Minister of Pensions. Henderson resigned on 11 August 1917 after his proposal for an international conference on the war was rejected by the rest of the Cabinet. The Labour National Executive Committee had rejected the Second International's request for a meeting of European socialist parties on the war in Stockholm, but after Henderson convinced it to give provisional support after visiting the Russian Republic as an envoy and recognizing that the Russian Provisional Government would collapse if the war continued.

In August 1917, three months before the Balfour Declaration, the Labour Party issued a statement in support of a Jewish state in Palestine. Henderson spoke in favor of a Jewish state.

Henderson turned his attention to building a strong constituency-based support network for the Labour Party. Previously, it had little national organisation, based largely on branches of unions and socialist societies. Working with Ramsay MacDonald and Sidney Webb, Henderson in 1918 established a national network of constituency organisations. They operated separately from trade unions and the National Executive Committee and were open to everyone sympathetic to the party's policies. Secondly, Henderson secured the adoption of a comprehensive statement of party policies, as drafted by Sidney Webb. Entitled "Labour and the New Social Order," it remained the basic Labour platform until 1950. It proclaimed a socialist party whose principles included a guaranteed minimum standard of living for everyone, nationalisation of industry, and heavy taxation of large incomes and of wealth.

== The "Coupon Election" and the 1920s ==
Henderson lost his seat in the "Coupon Election" of 14 December 1918, which had been announced within twenty-four hours of the end of hostilities and which resulted in a landslide victory for a coalition formed by Lloyd George. Henderson returned to Parliament in 1919 after winning a by-election in Widnes. He then became Labour's Chief Whip.

Vladimir Lenin held Henderson in very low regard. In a letter to the Soviet Commissar for Foreign Affairs, Georgy Chicherin, written on 10 February 1922 and referring to the Genoa Conference, Lenin wrote: "Henderson is as stupid as Kerensky, and for this reason he is helping us."

Henderson lost his seat again, at the general election of 1922. He returned to Parliament via another by-election, this time representing Newcastle East, but again, he was unseated at the general election of 1923. He returned to Parliament just two months later after winning another by-election in Burnley.

In 1924, Henderson was appointed as Home Secretary in the first-ever Labour government, led by MacDonald. This government was defeated later the same year and lost the general election that followed.

Having been re-elected in 1924, Henderson refused to challenge MacDonald for the party leadership. Worried about factionalism in the Labour Party, he published a pamphlet, Labour and the Nation, in which he attempted to clarify the party's goals.

== Foreign Secretary ==
In 1929, Labour formed another minority government and MacDonald appointed Henderson as Foreign Secretary, a position Henderson used to try to reduce the tensions that had been building up in Europe since the end of the First World War. Diplomatic relations were re-established with the Soviet Union and Henderson guaranteed Britain's full support to the League of Nations.

== The MacDonald "betrayal" ==
The Great Depression plunged the government into a terminal crisis. The Cabinet agreed that it was essential to maintain the Gold Standard and that the Budget needed to be balanced, but were divided over reducing unemployment benefits by 10%. At first, Henderson gave strong support to Prime Minister MacDonald throughout the financial and political crisis of August. The financial crisis across Europe was worsening and Britain's gold reserves were at high risk. New York banks provided an emergency loan; but additional money was needed and to get it, the budget had to be balanced. MacDonald and Chancellor of the Exchequer Philip Snowden proposed cuts in unemployment benefits. Henderson rejected that solution and became the leader of nearly half the Cabinet. The Labour Cabinet decided to resign. King George V implored MacDonald to remain and form an all-party National Government that would make the budget cuts. MacDonald agreed on 24 August 1931 and formed an emergency National Government, with members from all parties. The new cabinet had four Labour members (now called the "National Labour Organisation") who stood with MacDonald, plus four Conservatives and two Liberals. Labour unions were strongly opposed and the Labour Party officially repudiated the new National government. It expelled MacDonald and his supporters from the party. Henderson cast the only vote against the expulsions. Against his inclinations, Henderson accepted the leadership of the main Labour Party and led it into the general election on 27 October against the cross-party National coalition. It was a disastrous result for Labour, which was reduced to a small minority of 52. Yet again Henderson lost his seat, at Burnley. The following year, he relinquished the party leadership.

== Later career ==
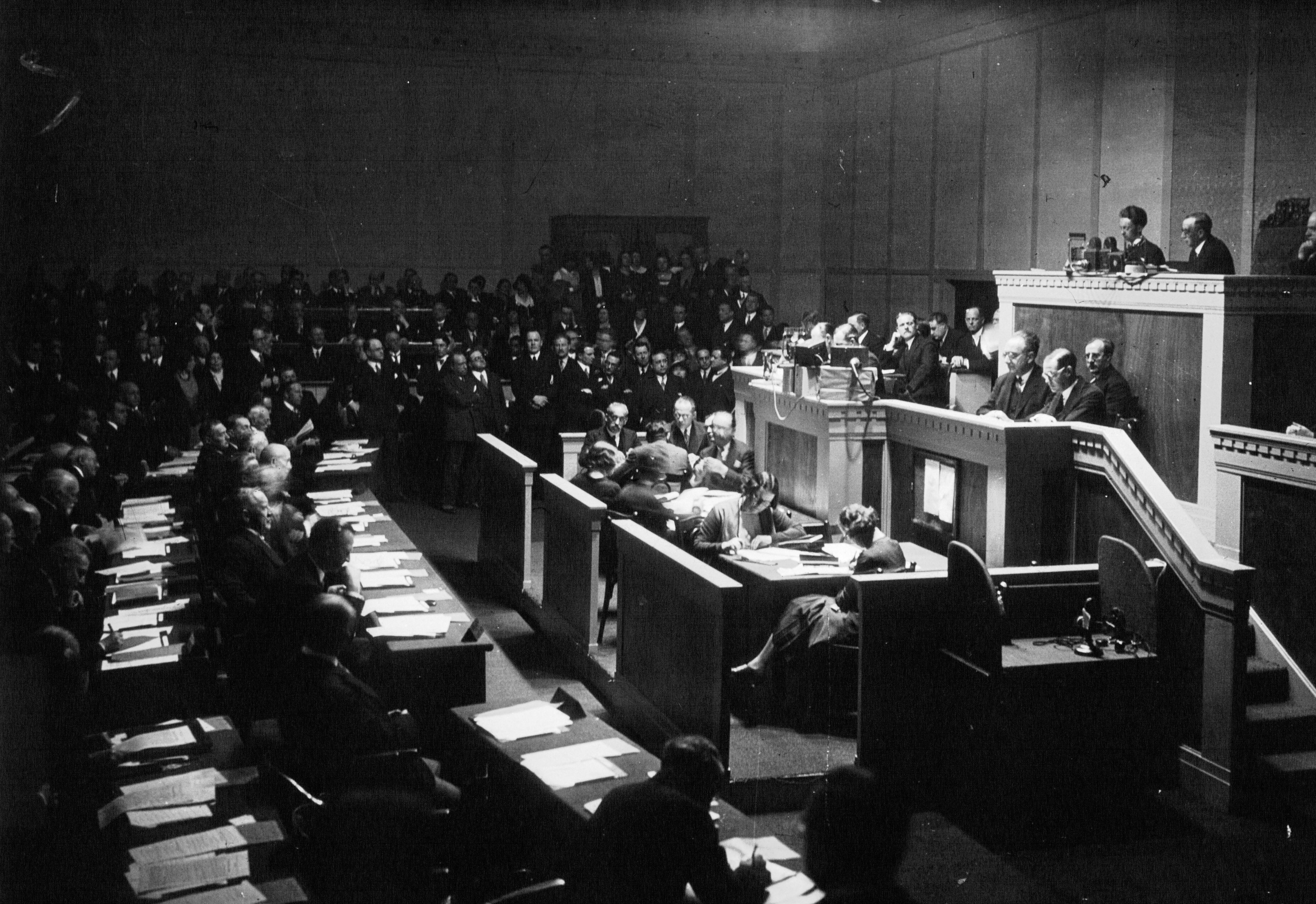
Henderson speaking at the World Disarmament Conference on 2 February 1932

Henderson returned to Parliament after winning a by-election at Clay Cross, achieving the unique feat of being elected five times at by-elections in constituencies where he had not previously been the MP. He holds the record for the greatest number of comebacks from losing a previous seat.

Henderson spent the rest of his life trying to halt the gathering storm of World War II. He worked with the World League of Peace and chaired the Geneva Disarmament Conference, and in 1934 he was awarded the Nobel Peace Prize. Henderson's Nobel Prize medal was stolen in a burglary of the office of the Lord Mayor of Newcastle on 3 April 2013. A man was subsequently jailed for the theft; the medal has never been recovered.

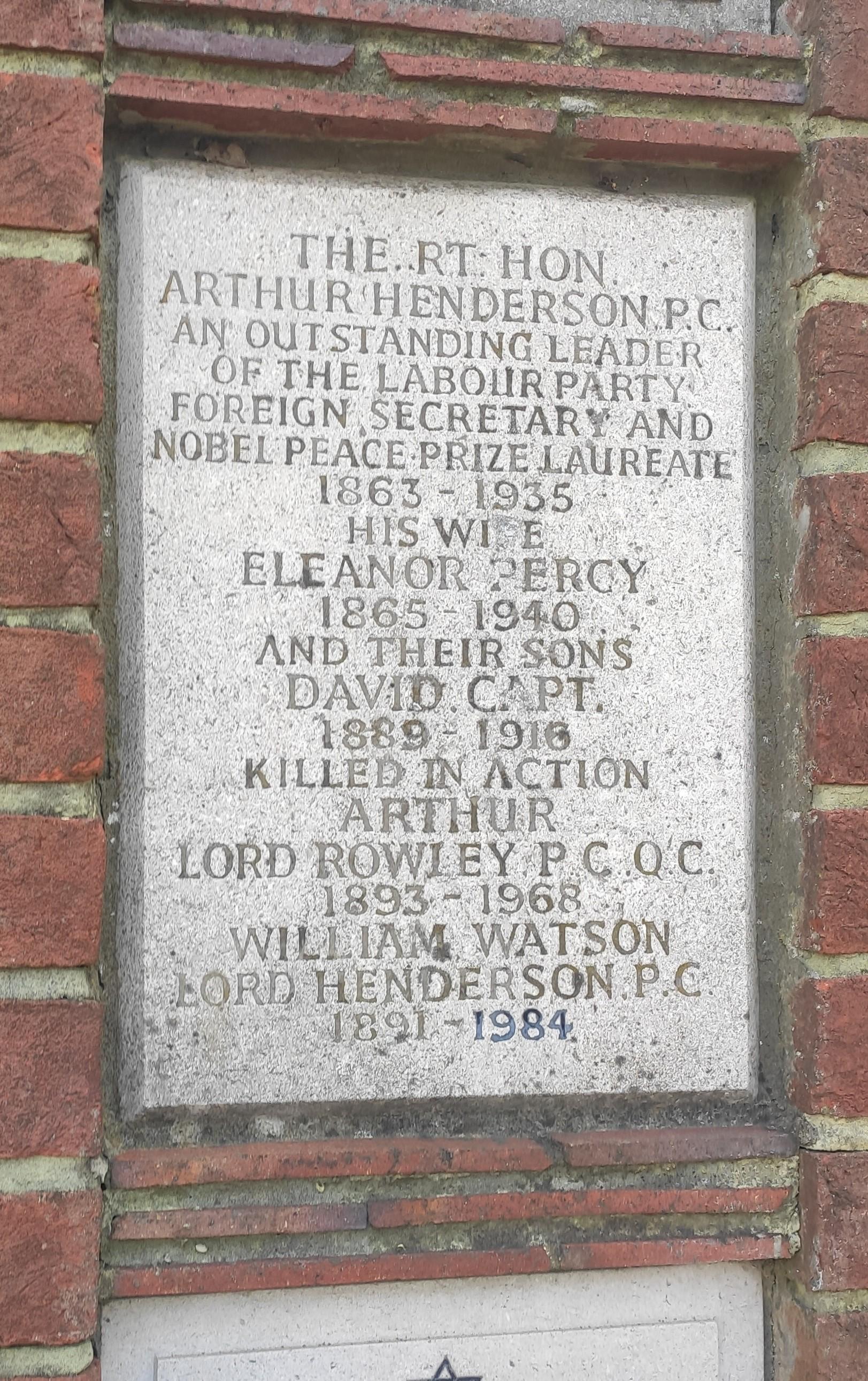
Plaque dedicated to Henderson, his wife and sons at Golders Green Crematorium

Henderson died in 1935, aged 72, and was cremated at Golders Green Crematorium. All three of Henderson's sons saw military service during the Great War, the eldest, David, being killed in action in 1916 whilst serving as a Captain with the Middlesex Regiment (Duke of Cambridge's Own). His surviving sons also became Labour politicians: second son William was granted the title of Baron Henderson in 1945, while his third son, Arthur, was created Baron Rowley in 1966.

The Labour History Archive and Study Centre at the People's History Museum in Manchester holds the papers of Arthur Henderson in their collection, spanning from 1915 to 1935.

=== Elections contested ===
==== UK Parliament elections ====
Date of election	Constituency	Party	Votes	%	Result
1903 by-election	Barnard Castle	Labour Repr. Cmte.	3,370	35.4	Elected
1906	Barnard Castle	Labour	5,540	58.8	Elected
1910 (Jan)	Barnard Castle	Labour	6,096	56.8	Elected
1910 (Dec)	Barnard Castle	Labour	5,868	57.0	Elected
1918	East Ham South	Labour	5,024	26.9	Not Elected (3rd)
1919 by-election	Widnes	Labour	11,404	52.3	Elected
1922	Widnes	Labour	12,897	46.8	Not Elected (2nd)
1923 by-election	Newcastle upon Tyne East	Labour	11,066	45.7	Elected
1923	Newcastle upon Tyne East	Labour	11,532	47.7	Not Elected (2nd)
1924 by-election	Burnley	Labour	24,571	58.4	Elected
1924	Burnley	Labour	20,549	45.4	Elected
1929	Burnley	Labour	28,091	45.4	Elected
1931	Burnley	Labour	26,917	43.0	Not Elected (2nd)
1933 by-election	Clay Cross	Labour	21,931	69.3	Elected

== Works ==
- The League of Nations and labour (1918)

== See also ==
- List of peace activists

== Sources ==
- Buckle, George Earle (1922). "Henderson, Arthur" . In Chisholm, Hugh (ed.). Encyclopædia Britannica (12th ed.). London & New York: The Encyclopædia Britannica Company.
- Carlton, David (1970). MacDonald versus Henderson: The Foreign Policy of the Second Labour Government. Palgrave Macmillan. ISBN 9781349006755.
- Hamilton, Mary Agnes. Arthur Henderson: A Biography (1938), a detailed and favourable account by a former colleague
- Howard, Christopher. "MacDonald, Henderson, and the Outbreak of War, 1914." Historical Journal 20.4 (1977): 871–891. online
- McKibbin, Ross. "Arthur Henderson as Labour Leader," International Review of Social History (1978) pp. 79–101
- Riddell, Neil. "Arthur Henderson, 1931–1932," in Leading Labour: From Keir Hardie to Tony Blair, ed. Kevin Jefferys (1999)
- Thorpe, Andrew. "Arthur Henderson and the British Political Crisis of 1931," Historical Journal (1988) pp. 117–139 in JSTOR
- UK National Archives, online
- Winkler, Henry H. "Arthur Henderson," in The Diplomats, 1919–1939, ed. Gordon A. Craig and Felix Gilbert (1953)
- Winter, J M. "Arthur Henderson, the Russian Revolution and the Reconstruction of the Labour Party," Historical Journal (1972) pp. 753–73. in JSTOR
- Wrigley, Chris. Arthur Henderson (1990), a scholarly biography online

Parliament of the United Kingdom
Preceded by Joseph Pease	Member of Parliament for Barnard Castle; 1903–1918	Succeeded by John Edmund Swan
Preceded by William Hall Walker	Member of Parliament for Widnes; 1919–1922	Succeeded by Christopher Clayton
Preceded by Joseph Nicholas Bell	Member of Parliament for Newcastle upon Tyne East; 1923–1923	Succeeded by Sir Robert Aske
Preceded by Dan Irving	Member of Parliament for Burnley; 1924–1931	Succeeded by Gordon Campbell
Preceded by Charles Duncan	Member of Parliament for Clay Cross; 1933–1935	Succeeded by Alfred Holland
Political offices
Preceded by Jack Pease	President of the Board of Education; 1915–1916	Succeeded by The Marquess of Crewe
Preceded by The Lord Newton	Paymaster General; 1916	Succeeded by Sir Joseph Compton-Rickett
Preceded by William Bridgeman	Home Secretary; 1924	Succeeded by Sir William Joynson-Hicks
Preceded by Sir Austen Chamberlain	Foreign Secretary; 1929–1931	Succeeded by The Marquess of Reading
Preceded by Stanley Baldwin	Leader of the Opposition; 1931–1932	Succeeded by George Lansbury
Party political offices
Preceded by New position	Treasurer of the Labour Party; 1904–1912	Succeeded by Ramsay MacDonald
Preceded by John Hodge	Chairman of the Annual Conference of the Labour Party; 1905–1906	Succeeded by J. J. Stephenson
Preceded by Keir Hardie	Chairman of the Labour Party; 1908–1910	Succeeded by George Nicoll Barnes
Preceded by Ramsay MacDonald	General Secretary of the Labour Party; 1912–1934	Succeeded by James Middleton
Preceded by Ramsay MacDonald	Chairman of the Labour Party; 1914–1917	Succeeded by William Adamson
Preceded by New position	President of the Labour and Socialist International; 1923–1924	Succeeded by Charlie Cramp
Preceded by Charlie Cramp	President of the Labour and Socialist International; 1925–1929	Succeeded by Emile Vandervelde
Preceded by Ramsay MacDonald	Treasurer of the Labour Party; 1929–1936	Succeeded by Arthur Greenwood
Preceded by Ramsay MacDonald	Leader of the Labour Party; 1931–1932	Succeeded by George Lansbury
