= Herbert Drinkwater =

British political activist

Herbert Drinkwater (1876 – November/December 1960) was a British socialist political activist.

Born in Gloucester, Drinkwater found work as a journalist in the North West of England. In 1899, he joined the Independent Labour Party (ILP).

The ILP soon affiliated to the Labour Party, and in 1918, Drinkwater began working for the party as a part-time organiser in the West Midlands. He proved successful, and in 1920 became the Labour Party's full-time regional organiser for the Midlands.

Drinkwater believed that the party organisers needed better support, so in 1920 he founded both the National Union of Labour Organisers, becoming its general secretary, and the Labour Organiser journal, which he edited.

In 1938, Drinkwater stood down as regional organiser, and set up a tobacconists shop in Worcester. He continued to run the union and edit the journal until he fully retired in 1944.
