= Barbara Casasola =

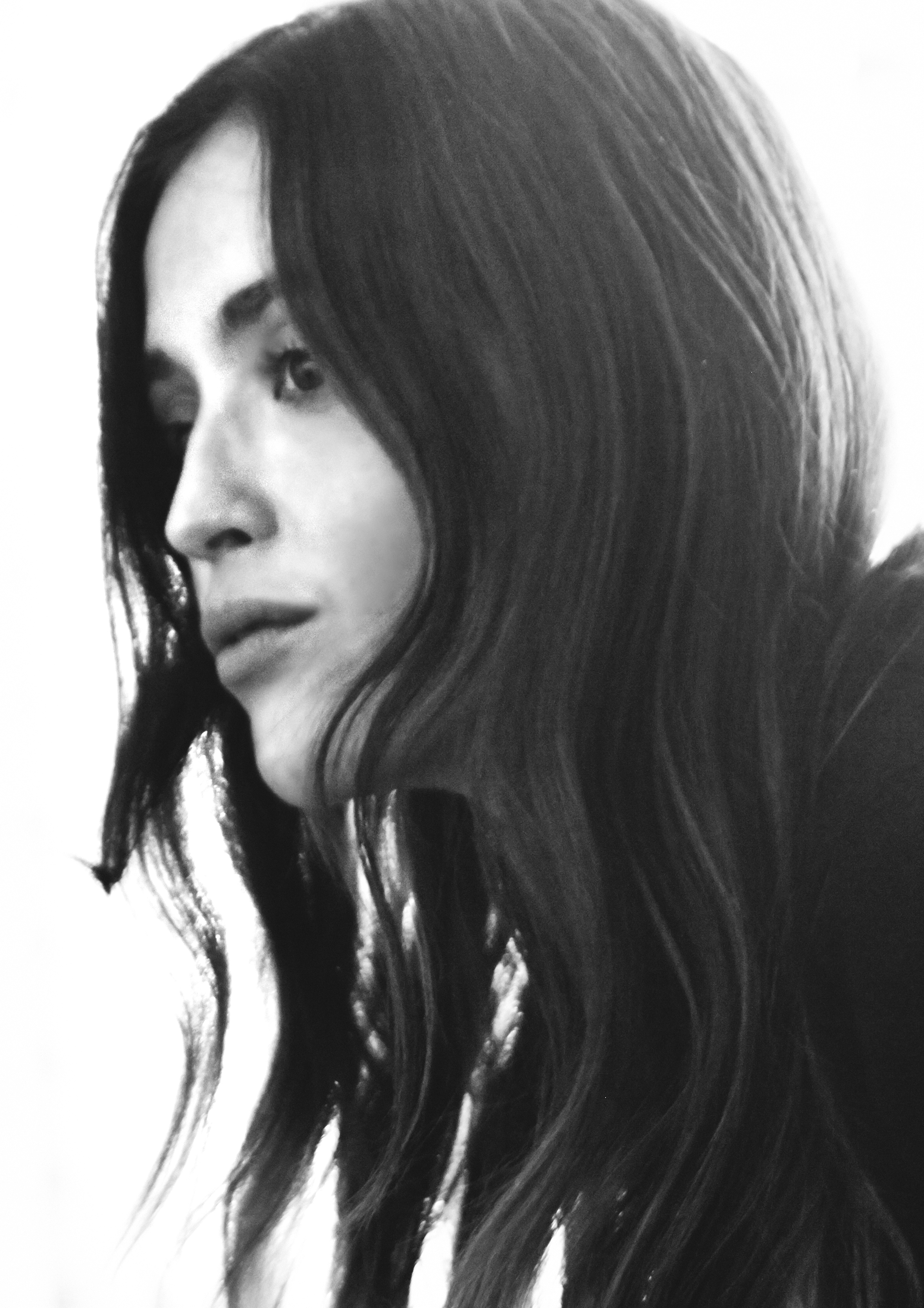
- Portrait by Harry Carr
- Born: 16 June 1984 (age 41); Brazil
- Education: Istituto Marangoni, Milan, Italy
- Label: BARBARA CASASOLA

Barbara Casasola (born 16 June 1984 in Brazil) is a Brazilian Italian fashion designer based in Florence, Italy. Her label, CASASOLA, is a women's luxury ready-to-wear brand. Her bi-annual collections focus on knitwear and suiting, all sustainably made in Italy.

== Career ==
Casasola started her career at Roberto Cavalli in Florence, Italy, as assistant designer for women's wear. Casasola remained there for three years, until she moved to Paris to consult for a number of major fashion houses.

In 2012, Casasola launched her label, BARBARA CASASOLA, with a presentation in Paris. Her subsequent catwalk debut in September 2013 at White Cube, London, was hailed as a "triumphant first showing" by CR Fashion Book. Vogue Italia wrote: “Barbara Casasola has established herself on the fashion scene as one of the most talented fashion designers of the moment”.

In September 2017, the label was rebranded to CASASOLA and in June 2019 it was relocated to Florence, Italy, where Barbara started her career.

CASASOLA is available at department stores and boutiques such as Net-a-Porter (Online), Selfridges (London), Joseph (London), The Webster (Miami), Just One Eye (Los Angeles), Antonia (Milan).

CASASOLA has been worn by some of the most photographed women in the world, including Beyonce, The Duchess of Cambridge, Kate Bosworth, Alicia Vikander and Gwyneth Paltrow.

== Awards ==
• WGSN Global Fashion Awards, Breakthrough Women's Wear Designer 2015: 14 May 2014, London

• Pitti Uomo Guest Women's Wear Designer: 9 January 2014, Florence

== See also ==
- List of fashion designers
