= Agustín Casasola =

Mexican photographer

Agustín Víctor Casasola (28 July 1874 – 30 March 1938) was a Mexican photographer and partial founder of the Mexican Association of Press Photographers.

Casasola began his career as a typographer for the newspaper El Imparcial, eventually moving to reporter then on to photographer in the early 1900s. He became a photographer in 1894. By 1911 Casasola was credited with founding the first Mexican press agency, Agencia Fotografica Mexicana. Casasola was later thanked by the interim president in 1911, Francisco León de la Barra, for having "inaugurated a new phase of freedom in the press photography." By the end of 1912 the agency had expanded and changed its name to Agencia Mexicana de Informacion Fotografica. The agency brought on more photographers and began purchasing pictures from foreign agencies and amateurs, then redistributing those photographs to newspapers.

When El Imparcial went out of business in 1917, Casasola recovered the newspaper's archives, eventually compiling many of the photographs into the famed "Album histórico gráfico" which covered the events of the Mexican Revolution. Casasola only managed to print the first 6 volumes covering the years 1910 to 1912. It is believed the work did not fare well due to the changing attitude of people wanting to move on from the death and suffering that plagued the civil war.

In 1920, Casasola as well as other notable Mexican photographers founded the Mexican Association of Press photographers. Casasola worked with his brother Miguel (1876-1951) and the family business expanded with the participation of his sons and daughters, Gustavo (1900-1982), Agustín (1901-1980), Ismael (1902-1964), Dolores (1907-2001), Piedad (1909-1953) and Mario (1923-1988). It carried on to the third generation with Ismael (1926-1970) and Juan (1937-1984), and Agustín (1930-1995). Casasola's collection was later renamed the Casasola Archive and is the foundational collection of the Mexican government's photographic archive, the Fototeca Nacional, administered by the National Institute of Anthropology and History of Mexico, in Pachuca. The collection totals over 500,000 prints and negatives. The archive is not exclusively the work of Casasola himself; it has the photos of some 500 different photographers. Researchers have found that the names of a number of the original photographers have been removed and Casasola's name substituted. Casasola might have "recogniz[ed] that it was important to create a single brand in order to compete with the foreign photo news agencies pouring into Mexico during the Revolution.

== See also ==
- Casasola Archive
- News agency
- Photography
- Mexican Revolution
