= Casasola, Ávila =

Casasola
- municipality
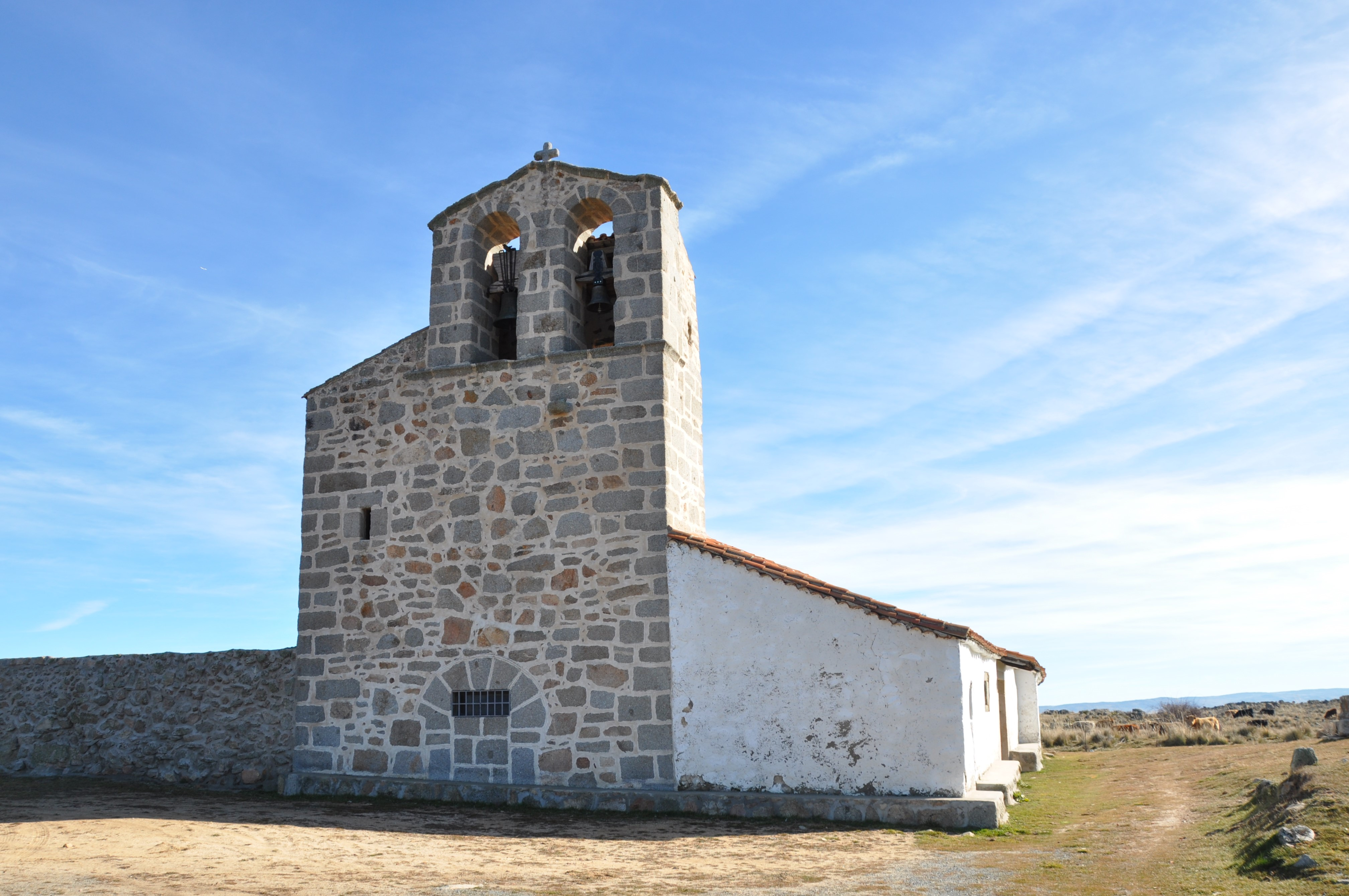
- Church of Our Lady of the Assumption halfway between Casasola and Duruelo
- Flag Coat of arms
- Location in Spain. Casasola (Spain)
- Coordinates: 40°40′08″N 4°49′36″W
- Country: Spain
- Autonomous community: Castile and León
- Province: Ávila
- Municipality: Casasola

Area
  - Total: 18.36 km^{2} (7.09 sq mi)

Population (2025-01-01)
  - Total: 67
  - Density: 3.6/km^{2} (9.5/sq mi)
- Time zone: UTC+1 (CET)
  - Summer (DST): UTC+2 (CEST)
- Website: Official website

Casasola is a municipality located in the province of Ávila, Castile and León, Spain.

== Area and Population ==
It has a surface area of 18.36 km^{2}.

Historical population
Year	Pop.	±% p.a.
2020	73	—
2021	68	−6.85%
2022	67	−1.47%
2023	66	−1.49%
2024	63	−4.55%
2025	67	+6.35%
Source: INE
