= Health and Safety Commission =

UK non-departmental public body

Commission overview
- Formed: 31 July 1974
- Dissolved: 1 April 2008
- Superseding Commission: Health and Safety Executive
- Type: Crown-status non-departmental public body
- Jurisdiction: England and Wales and Scotland

The Health and Safety Commission (HSC) was a United Kingdom non-departmental public body. The HSC was created by the Health and Safety at Work etc. Act 1974 (HSWA). It was formally established on 31 July 1974. The Commission consisted of a chairman and between six and nine other people, appointed by the Secretary of State for Employment, latterly the Secretary of State for Work and Pensions, after consultation. The first meeting of the HSC took place on 1 October 1974. Its responsibilities covered England and Wales and Scotland. In Northern Ireland, its functions were carried out by the Health and Safety Executive for Northern Ireland. It merged with the Health and Safety Executive on 1 April 2008.

== Functions ==
The Commission's duties were to:

- Assist and encourage persons concerned with matters relevant to the operation of the objectives of the HSWA;
- Make arrangements for and encourage research and publication, training and information in connection with its work;
- Make arrangements for securing that government departments, employers, employees, their respective representative organisations, and other persons are provided with an information and advisory service and are kept informed of, and adequately advised on, such matters;
- Propose regulations.

The Commission was further obliged keep the Secretary of State informed of its plans and ensure alignment with the policies of the Secretary of State, giving effect to any directions given to it. The Secretary of State could give directions to the Commission.

On 1 April 2006, the Commission ceased to have responsibility for railway safety.

== Personnel ==
The Health and Safety Commission had five chair persons in its 34-year existence

- William (Bill) James Simpson (born 20 May 1920, died November 2001) July 1974 - 1983.
- Sir (Edward) John Cullen (born 19 October 1926, died 14 January 2018) 1983 - 30 September 1993.
- Sir Frank John Davies CBE OStJ (born 24 September 1931) 1 October 1993 - 30 September 1999.
- William (Bill) Henry Callaghan (born 19 May 1948) 1 October 1999 - 30 September 2007.
- Judith Hackitt (born 1 December 1954) 1 October 2007 - 31 March 2008.

Commission members included:

- Sandy Blair CBE, 1 April 2006 to 31 March 2008 continued on HSE Board
- George Brumwell CBE, 1 April 1998 to 31 October 2004
- Margaret Burns, 1 April 1998 to 31 March 2007
- Danny Carrigan, 1 October 2004 to 31 March 2008 continued on HSE Board
- Abdul Chowdry JP, 1 April 1999 to 30 March 2005
- Robin Dahlberg, 1 April 2007 to 31 March 2008 continued on HSE Board
- Judith Donovan CBE, 1 October 2000 to 31 March 2008 continued on HSE Board
- Joyce Edmond-Smith, 1 April 1997 to 31 March 2006
- Judith Hackitt 1 April 2002 to 28 February 2006
- Sonny Hamid, 1 April 1999 to March 2002
- Dr Sayeed Khan, 1 April 2005 to 31 March 2008 continued on HSE Board
- John Longworth, 1 April 2002 to 31 March 2008
- Hugh Robertson, 1 April 2004 to 31 March 2008 continued on HSE Board
- Maureen Rooney OBE, 1 October 2000 to 2003 (died 1 May 2003)
- Elizabeth Snape MBE, 1 November 2003 to 31 March 2008 continued on HSE Board
- John Spanswick, 1 May 2006 to 31 March 2008 continued on HSE Board
- Rex Symons CBE, 1 October 1989 to March 2002
- Owen Tudor, 17 November 1998 to 2004

== Merger with the HSE ==
In practice, the Commission delegated its responsibilities to the Health and Safety Executive (HSE).

In August 2007, the Department for Work and Pensions started consultation on merger of the HSC and HSE to a largely positive response. On 18 March 2008, government minister Lord McKenzie of Luton announced that the merger would be completed during spring 2008. The merger was completed on 1 April 2008.
