= 1903 Barnard Castle by-election =

1903 British election

- 24 July 1903

Candidate	Henderson	Vane	Beaumont
Party	Labour Repr. Cmte.	Conservative	Liberal
Popular vote	3,370	3,323	2,809
Percentage	35.4%	35.0%	29.6%
MP before election
Sir Joseph Pease
Liberal
Subsequent MP
Arthur Henderson
Labour Repr. Cmte.

The 1903 Barnard Castle by-election was a parliamentary by-election held for the British House of Commons constituency of Barnard Castle, in County Durham, on 24 July 1903.

== Vacancy ==
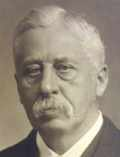
Pease

The by-election was caused by the death of the sitting Liberal MP, Sir Joseph Pease on 23 June 1903 at the age of 75. Pease had been MP for Barnard Castle since the 1885 general election, and before that one of the two MPs for South Durham since 1865.

== Candidates ==
Beaumont

The Liberals selected Hubert Beaumont to succeed Pease. Beaumont had fought King's Lynn in 1895 and Buckingham in 1900. He would go on to become the MP for Eastbourne at the 1906 election. He was 39 years old at the election.

William Lyonel Vane was the Unionist candidate. Vane had fought the seat as the Unionist candidate in the 1895 and 1900 elections. losing on both occasions in straight fights against Pease. He was 43 years old and was a colonel in the 6th Battalion, Durham Light Infantry.

The Friendly Society of Iron Founders agreed to sponsor a Labour Representation Committee candidate. Arthur Henderson was selected, receiving 5,619 votes from their membership, defeating Robert Morley, who took only 1,411. Henderson was one of the delegates to the founding conference of the LRC in 1900, and had been elected Mayor of Darlington earlier in 1903. He had previously worked as agent for Pease, and was also 39 years old.

== Result ==
The by-election was a tight three way battle between them, the Conservatives and the Liberals, an extremely unusual by-election for the time. A crowd of 3,000 gathered in the market place at Barnard Castle on Saturday 26 July to hear that Henderson had beaten Vane by 47 votes, with Beaumont in third place and the 2,803 Liberal votes splitting the left wing of the electorate.

Henderson was the first Labour candidate to win against both Liberal and Conservative opposition, becoming only the fifth Labour MP, joining Keir Hardie and Richard Bell, who had been elected at the 1900 election, David Shackleton who had been elected for Clitheroe in a by-election in 1902, and Will Crooks who had been elected for Woolwich in a by-election four months earlier. This was also the third by-election win for Labour.

The victory was widely celebrated in the constituency: "In Cockfield, Henderson gave his first speech as an MP, but had to wait several minutes for the crowd to stop cheering and proclaiming a victory for the working class ... He then walked to Evenwood, and along the way, people came out from the farms and hamlets to shake his hand. When he arrived he was carried aloft through town ... Henderson's train back to Darlington was delayed, as cheering crowds stopped it along the way."

Henderson

1903 Barnard Castle by-election
Party	Candidate	Votes	%	±%
Labour Repr. Cmte.	Arthur Henderson	3,370	35.4	New
Conservative	William Lyonel Vane	3,323	35.0	−6.3
Liberal	Hubert Beaumont	2,809	29.6	−29.1
Majority		47	0.4	N/A
Turnout		9,502	84.6	+6.9
Labour Repr. Cmte. gain from Liberal		Swing		

== Aftermath ==
Henderson would remain as MP for the division until 1918, when he instead fought, and lost, the southern division of East Ham. He would serve three times as Leader of the Labour Party, and as both Home and Foreign Secretary, as well as winning by-elections in four other constituencies.

== See also ==
- List of United Kingdom by-elections
- United Kingdom by-election records
