= Friendly Society of Iron Founders of England, Ireland and Wales =

UK trade union

Friendly Society of Iron Founders
- Friendly Society of Iron Founders of England, Ireland and Wales
- Merged into: National Union of Foundry Workers
- Founded: 1809
- Dissolved: 1920
- Location: United Kingdom
- Members: 11,000 (1867); 19,501 (1907)
- Affiliations: TUC

The Friendly Society of Iron Founders of England, Ireland and Wales (FSIF) was an early trade union representing foundry workers in the United Kingdom.

== History ==
The union was founded in 1809 in Bolton as the Friendly Iron Moulders' Society. Unlike the many friendly societies which focused on mutual welfare, it organised workers with the aim of improving their working conditions. This was illegal under the Combination Act 1799, and so in the early years, the books of the organisation were buried in a nearby peat bog between meetings, in order to evade detection. By 1837, it felt able to meet publicly, and held its first delegate meeting. This meeting, in Manchester, decided to rename the union as the Friendly Society of Operative Iron Moulders of the United Kingdom of Great Britain and Ireland.

The union relocated from Manchester to London in 1850, and decided against joining the newly formed Amalgamated Society of Engineers. In 1852 it elected its first full-time general secretary, William Harvey, who held the office for eleven years. Although he was seen as hard-working, in particular in establishing a central register of all members and benefits, under his leadership there was little financial oversight of branches, and numerous cases of embezzlement emerged. The union's appeal committee dismissed the entire executive committee including Harvey, who nonetheless agreed to remain in office until an election was held. This was won by Daniel Guile, who became a nationally prominent figure as a member of the trade union "Junta". In 1864, the union took its final name, while, three years later, it claimed to have more than 11,000 members.

In 1899, the union was a founder of the General Federation of Trade Unions (GFTU), with secretary Joseph Maddison becoming the GFTU's treasurer. The union also affiliated to the Labour Representation Committee, and its member Arthur Henderson became one of the first Labour Members of Parliament. However, in 1901 it was expelled from the Trades Union Congress following a dispute with the Brass Moulders.

In 1905, the union relocated back to Manchester, to a purpose-built headquarters on Chorlton Road. The union's entire executive was dismissed in 1912 for agreeing to pay itself expenses at 12s 6d per day, when the rules stated it was only due 7s. This led to a lengthy dispute during which former assistant general secretary Jeremiah Olive ran the union until fresh elections were held in 1914 and won by a new face, Alfred Todd. Todd took the union into a merger in 1920, joining with the Amalgamated Society of Coremakers of Great Britain and Ireland and the Associated Iron Moulders of Scotland to form the National Union of Foundry Workers.

== Election results ==
The union sponsored Labour Party candidates in numerous elections, and Arthur Henderson was frequently elected.

Election	Constituency	Candidate	Votes	Percentage	Position
1903 by-election	Barnard Castle	Arthur Henderson	3,370	35.4	1
1906 general election	Barnard Castle	Arthur Henderson	5,540	58.8	1
1910 Jan general election	Barnard Castle	Arthur Henderson	6,096	56.7	1
1910 Dec general election	Barnard Castle	Arthur Henderson	5,868	57.0	1
1918 general election	East Ham South	Arthur Henderson	5,024	26.9	3
1918 general election	Smethwick	John Davison	9,389	52.2	1
1919 by-election	Widnes	Arthur Henderson	11,404	52.3	1

== Secretaries ==
By 1837: Thomas Mather
1838: Robert Denham
1840: William Harvey
1841: John Wroe
1843: William Glasebrook
1852: William Harvey
1863: Daniel Guile
1883: Edward Woods
1886: William Henry Hey
1894: Joseph Maddison
1908: William M. Lawson
1912: Jeremiah Olive (acting)
1914: Alfred Todd
