= Blackburn West =

Parliamentary constituency in the United Kingdom, 1950–1955

- Former borough constituency for the House of Commons

1950–1955
- Seats: one
- Created from: Blackburn
- Replaced by: Blackburn

Blackburn West was a parliamentary constituency in the town of Blackburn in Lancashire. It returned one Member of Parliament (MP) to the House of Commons of the Parliament of the United Kingdom, elected by the first past the post system.

The constituency was created for the 1950 general election, when the former two-member Blackburn constituency was divided into Blackburn East and Blackburn West. It was abolished only five years later, for the 1955 general election, when it was partly replaced by a new single-member Blackburn constituency.

== Boundaries ==
1950–1955: The County Borough of Blackburn wards of Park, St Andrew's, St Luke's, St Mark's, St Paul's, St Peter's, and St Silas's.

== Members of Parliament ==
Election	Member	Party
1950	Ralph Assheton	Conservative
1955	constituency abolished: see Blackburn	

== Elections ==
=== Elections in the 1950s ===
General election 1950: Blackburn West
Party	Candidate	Votes	%	±%
Conservative	Ralph Assheton	19,329	52.5	
Labour	John Edwards	17,450	47.5	
Majority		1,879	5.0	
Turnout		36,779	89.6	
Conservative win (new seat)				

General election 1951: Blackburn West
Party	Candidate	Votes	%	±%
Conservative	Ralph Assheton	19,695	53.7	+1.2
Labour	Roland Casasola	16,996	46.3	−1.2
Majority		2,699	7.3	+2.3
Turnout		36,779	88.9	−0.7
Conservative hold		Swing	+1.2	
