= Associated Iron Moulders of Scotland =

Scottish trade union

- Predecessor: Scottish Iron Moulders' Friendly Society
- Merged into: National Union of Foundry Workers
- Founded: 1831
- Dissolved: 1920
- Headquarters: 12 St Vincent Place, Glasgow
- Location: Scotland
- Members: 8,127 (1907)
- Affiliations: TUC, STUC, FEST

The Associated Iron Moulders of Scotland (AIMS) was a trade union representing foundry workers in Scotland.

The union was created in 1831 as the Scottish Iron Moulders' Union. Its founder was James Dunn, a former cotton worker who had been blacklisted for trade union activities in his own trade. He spotted a gap produced by the failure of the Scottish Iron Moulders' Friendly Society, and the new union was successful, growing to 556 members by 1834, and gaining increases of 4 shillings per week for its members.

The union attempted to restrict the number of workers in the industry by campaigning to limit the number of apprentices, and charging a fee of £5 for non-Scottish workers to join the union. Due to its high subscriptions, it was able to pay a pension of 3s 6d per week to retired members, and additional benefits including one for members who suffered accidents at work.

The union adopted its final name in 1869, joining the Trades Union Congress in 1875. It was also an early member of the Scottish Trades Union Congress. By the early 1910s, it had more than 7,500 members.

In 1920, the union merged with the Friendly Society of Iron Founders of England, Ireland and Wales and the Amalgamated Society of Coremakers of Great Britain to form the National Union of Foundry Workers.

== General Secretaries ==
1831: James Dunn
McGowan
1850: William Lees
1852: David Adamson
1860: Colin Steel
1866: Robert Skimming
1869: John Fraser
1879: James Millar Jack
1912: John Brown
1918: James Fulton
