= Casasola Archive =

Mexican Culture Archive

The Casasola Archive is a photographic archive of Mexican history and culture, the foundational collection of the photo archive, Fototeca Nacional, administered by the Mexican government. The archive contains important historical photos from the regime of Porfirio Diaz and the Mexican Revolution. The main collection was compiled by Agustín Víctor Casasola, a photo journalist in Mexico City. The archive contains his own work as well as that of some 500 other photographers, with both positive prints and negative films, in various formats and on various photographic media. Since 1976, it is preserved in the climate-controlled rooms in a former colonial-era Franciscan convent, now the National Photo Library, of the National Institute of Anthropology and History (INAH) in Pachuca, Hidalgo, Mexico. The building houses the photographic archive and has exhibition spaces. The photo library currently gathers images in 39 sections, with a total of 850,000 items (positive and negative).

== History ==
Agustín Víctor Casasola (1874–1938) and his brother Miguel (1876–1951) were pioneers of photo reportage. From their photos of the Mexican Revolution, where they sold the prints but retained the negatives, the archive was begun by Agustín Victor and carried forward by his children Gustavo (1900–1982), Agustín (1901–1980), Ismael (1902–1964), Dolores (1907–2001), Piedad (1909–1953) and Mario (1923–1988). Other photographers’ works that are part of the collection include Guillermo Kahlo, (father of Frida Kahlo), Hugo Brehme, Manuel Ramos, Eduardo Salmerón, Samuel Tinoco, and F.L. Clarke.

The collection is heavily weighted toward images in Mexico City, where the family was based, and with many photographs of politicians and political events, but there are also many scenes of everyday life, including scenes of industry, transportation, urbanization, crime, advertising, sports, arts, entertainment and portraits of the inhabitants of the capital.

Until 1975, the archive was held by the Casasola family. With the possibility of its being sold and sent out of the country, the Mexican government purchased the collection, seeing it as an important part of its cultural patrimony. The administrator of the archive is the National Institute of Anthropology and History, in the INAH National Photo Library. The former colonial-era convent of San Francisco in Pachuca, Hidalgo was renovated for climate control and the facility was opened on 20 November 1976, the anniversary of the beginning of the Mexican Revolution, where it remains to date. The Casasola Archive of the National Photo Library consists of 483,993 pieces, of which 411,904 are negatives – mostly glass plates and nitrates – and 72,089 positive prints. Of these, 43% are digitized and available for consultation in the automated catalog of the National Photo Library System.

== Gallery ==
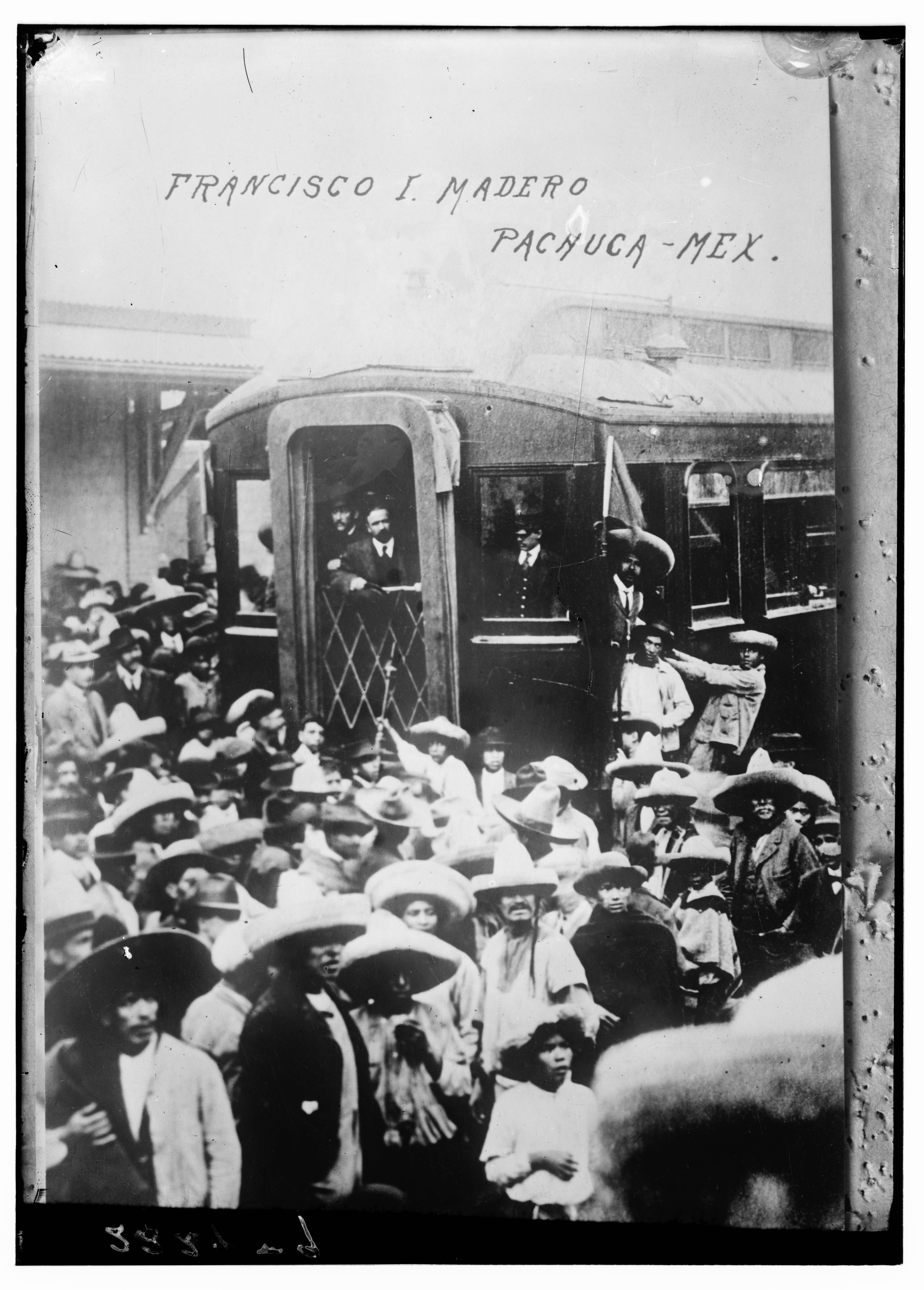
Arrival of Francisco I. Madero at Pachuca

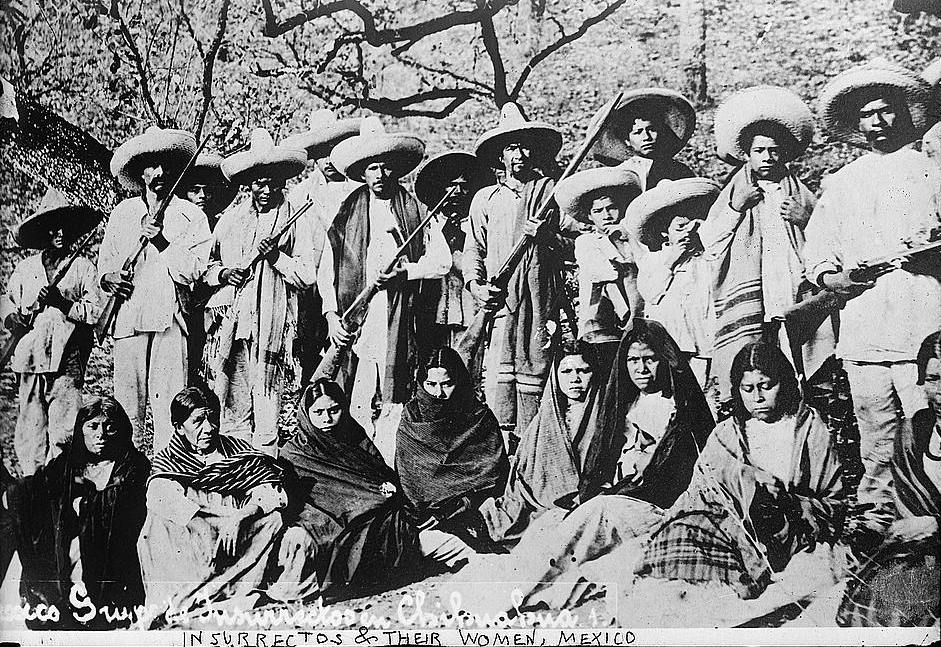
Revolutionary soldieras and soldaderas (Adelitas)

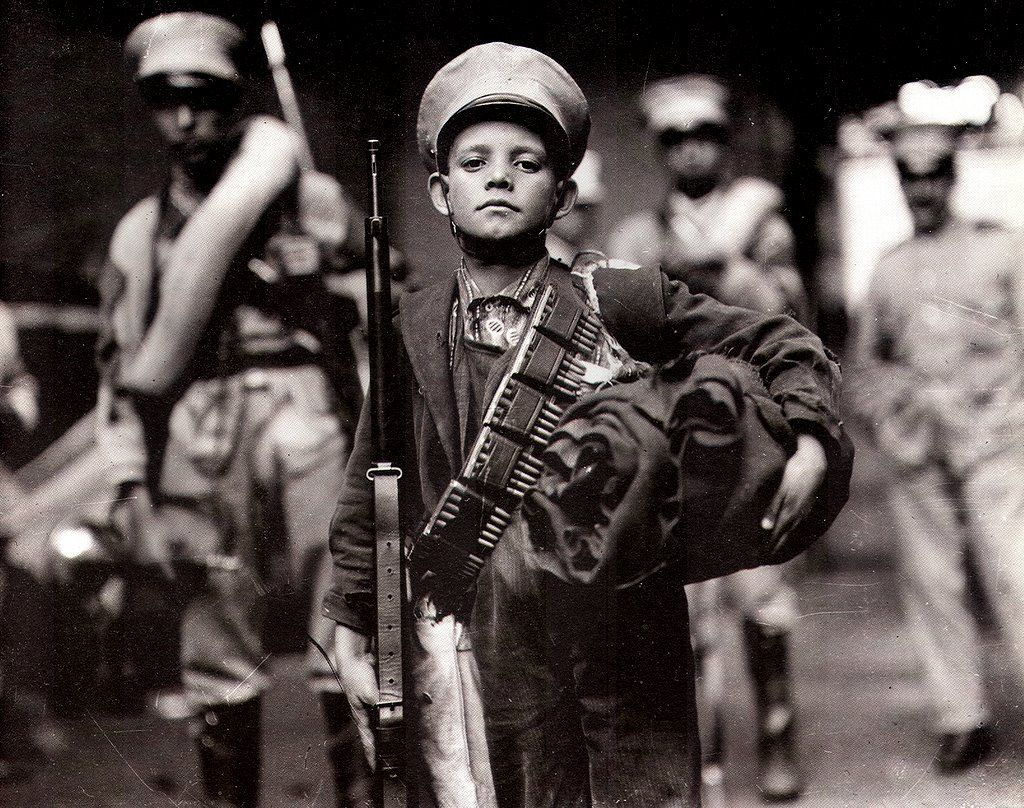
Child soldier

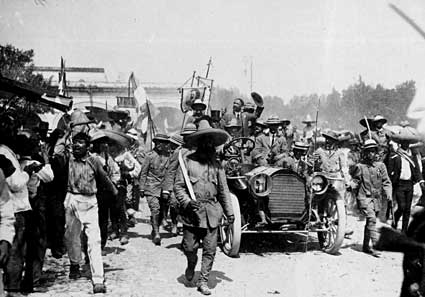
Francisco I. Madero and Emiliano Zapata in Cuernavaca

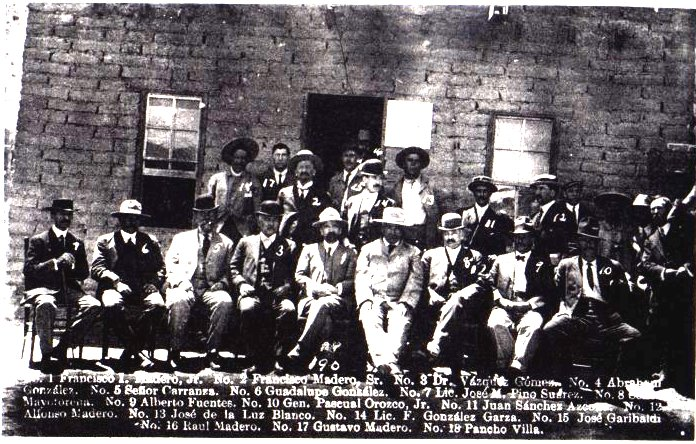
The victory at Ciudad Juárez Venustiano Carranza, Francisco I. Madero, Pascual Orozco, Francisco Villa 1911.

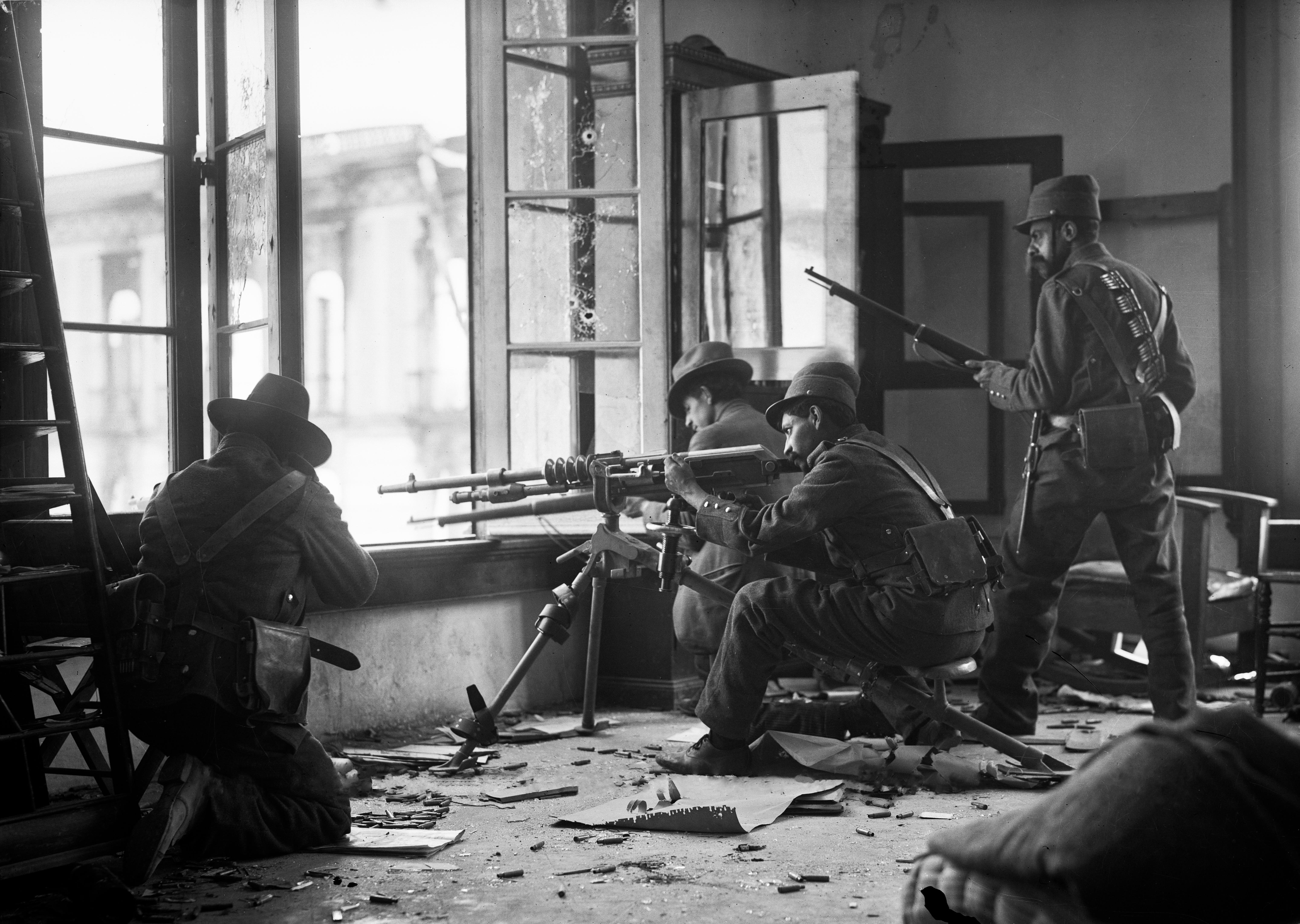
Ten Tragic Days February 1913

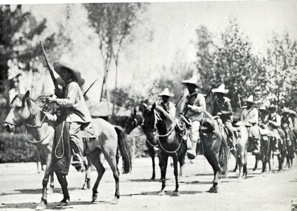
Constitutionalist Army cavalry

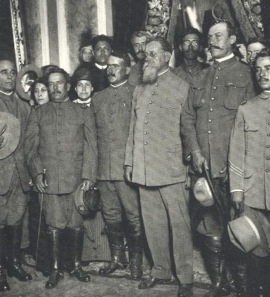
Venustiano Carranza and General Álvaro Obregón.

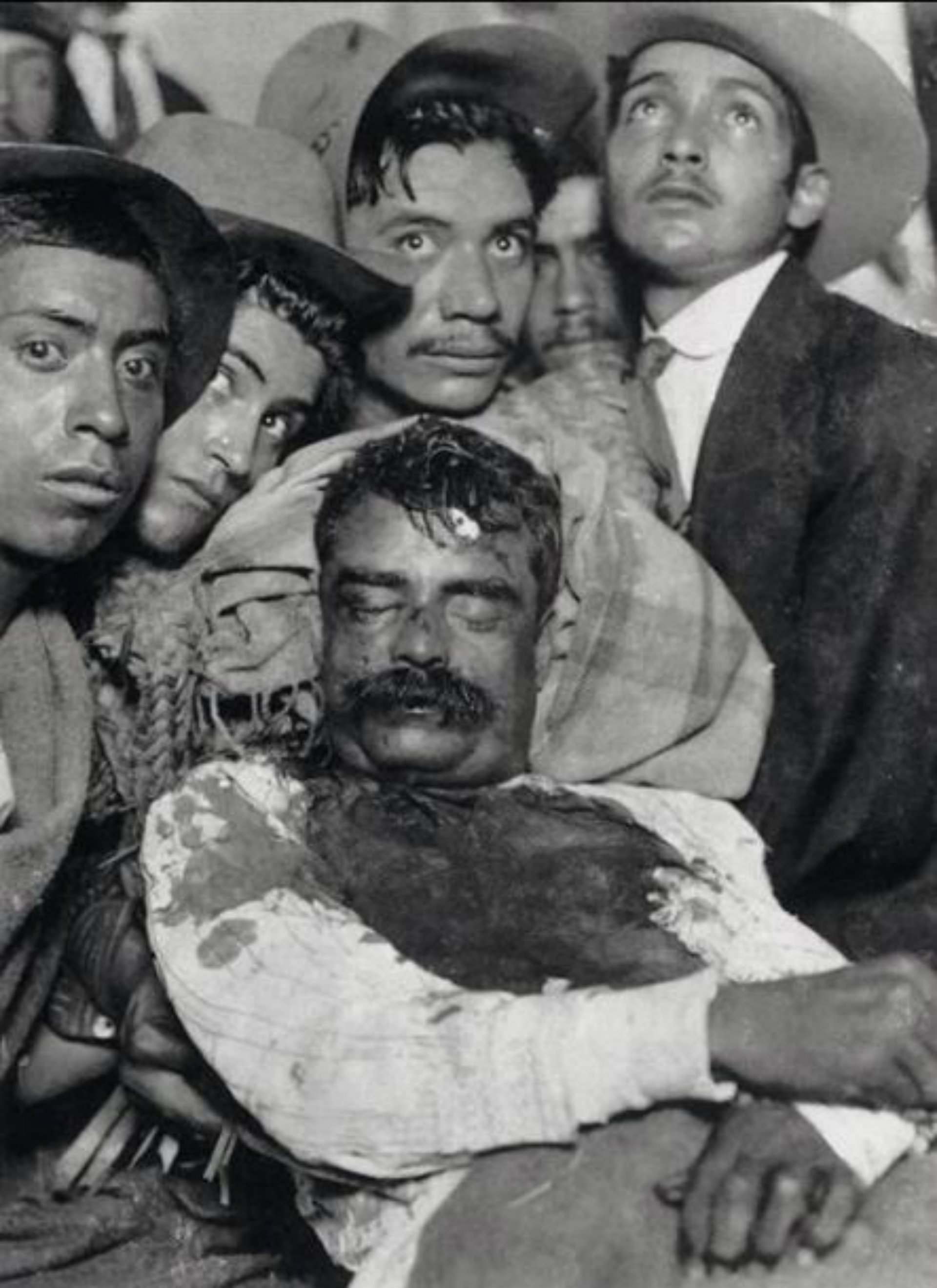
The body of Emiliano Zapata, exhibited in Cuautla, Morelos 1919

== See also ==
- Agustín Victor Casasola
- Mexican Revolution
- History of photography
- Porfiriato
