= 1924 Burnley by-election =

UK Parliamentary by-election

The 1924 Burnley by-election was held on 28 February 1924. The by-election was held due to the death of the incumbent Labour MP, Dan Irving. It was won by the Labour candidate Arthur Henderson who had led the party. Henderson had lost his Newcastle East seat at last year's general election, but had been appointed Home Secretary in the Labour Government which had taken office in January.

Burnley by-election, 1924 Electorate
Party	Candidate	Votes	%	±%
Labour	Arthur Henderson	24,571	58.4	+20.6
Conservative	Harold Edward Joscelyn Camps	17,534	41.6	+9.8
Majority		7,037	16.8	+10.8
Turnout		42,105	82.4	−4.9
Labour hold		Swing	+5.4	
