= 1923 Newcastle-upon-Tyne East by-election =

UK Parliamentary by-election

← 1922	17 January 1923	1923 →

Candidate	Henderson	Barnes	Gee
Party	Labour	Liberal	Unionist
Popular vote	11,066	6,682	6,480
Percentage	45.7%	27.6%	26.7%
MP before election
Bell
Labour
Subsequent MP
Henderson
Labour

The 1923 Newcastle-upon-Tyne East by-election was held on 17 January 1923. The by-election was held due to the death of the incumbent Labour MP, Joseph Nicholas Bell.

== Electoral history ==
Bell

General election 1922: Newcastle upon Tyne East
Party	Candidate	Votes	%	±%
Labour	Joseph Nicholas Bell	10,084	43.1	+8.4
Liberal	Harry Barnes	6,999	30.0	−28.1
National Liberal	Gilbert Stone	6,273	26.9	N/A
Majority		3,085	13.1	N/A
Turnout		23,356	73.7	+25.0
Labour gain from Liberal		Swing	+18.3	

== Result ==
Newcastle-upon-Tyne East by-election, 1923
Party	Candidate	Votes	%	±%
Labour	Arthur Henderson	11,066	45.7	+2.6
Liberal	Harry Barnes	6,682	27.6	−2.4
Conservative	Robert Gee	6,480	26.7	New
Majority		4,384	18.1	+5.0
Turnout		24,228	76.4	+2.7
Labour hold		Swing		

== Aftermath ==
General election 1923: Newcastle upon Tyne East
Party	Candidate	Votes	%	±%
Liberal	Robert Aske	12,656	52.3	+22.3
Labour	Arthur Henderson	11,532	47.7	+4.6
Majority		1,124	4.6	N/A
Turnout		24,188	73.2	−0.5
Liberal gain from Labour		Swing	+8.9	
