= 1919 Widnes by-election =

UK Parliamentary by-election

- 30 August 1919 (Polling); 12 September 1919 (Declaration)
- Registered: 30,674
- Turnout: 71.1%
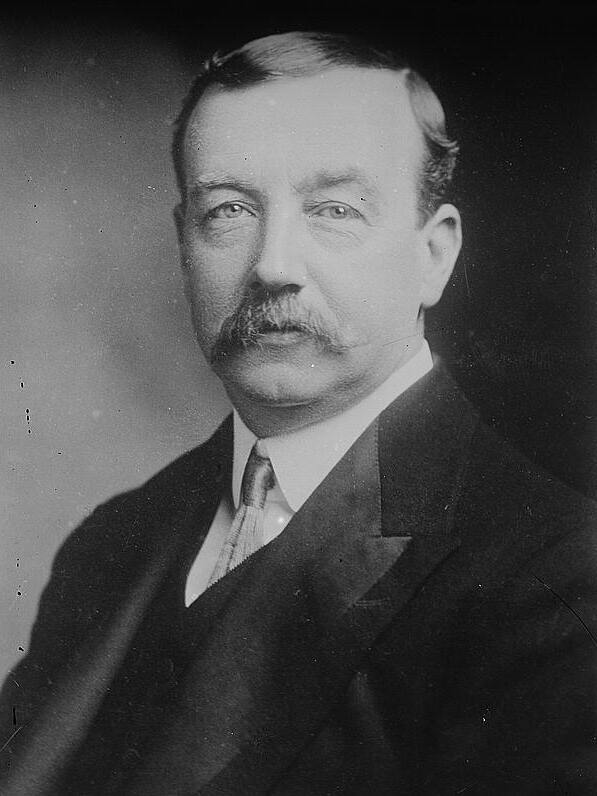

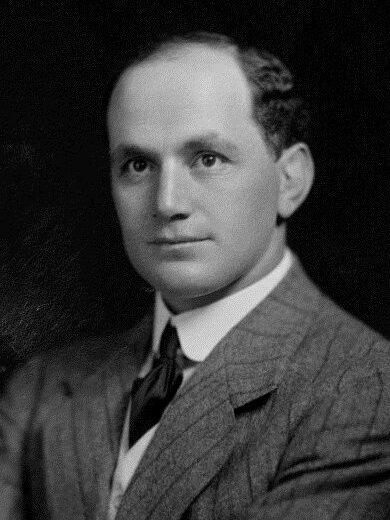
Candidate	Arthur Henderson	Frank Fisher
Party	Labour	Unionist
Alliance	Liberal	Coalition
Popular vote	11,404	10,417
Percentage	52.3%	47.7%
Swing	▲11.9%	▼11.9%
MP before election
William Walker
Unionist
Subsequent MP
Arthur Henderson
Labour

The 1919 Widnes by-election was held on 30 August 1919. The by-election was held due to the elevation to the peerage of the incumbent Conservative MP, William Walker. It was won by the Labour candidate Arthur Henderson.

== Background ==
On 18 August 1919, William Walker the Conservative member for the constituency of Widnes since the 1900 general election resigned from Parliament as prelude to being raised to the peerage as Baron Wavertree of Delamere in the County of Chester on 27 October.

== Candidates ==
=== Unionist ===
Frank Fisher

- Frank Fisher, tennis player and former member of the New Zealand House of Representatives for Wellington Central (1905–1914)

=== Labour ===
Tom Williamson, Liverpool district delegate of the National Amalgamated Union of Labour and candidate for this seat in 1918 declined to stand again with the Party instead choosing its former Leader Arthur Henderson.

- Arthur Henderson, former Leader of the Labour Party (1908–1910, 1914–1917), Minister without portfolio (1916–1917), Paymaster General (1916), President of the Board of Education (1915–1916) and former member for Barnard Castle (1903–1918)

=== Liberal ===
On 23 August the Liberal Association of the Widnes Parliamentary Division released a statement declining put forward their own candidate and opting to support Henderson.

=== NDP ===
- John Millar, a local councillor, was announced as the candidate of the National Democratic and Labour Party, however he would withdraw before the close of nominations.

== Result ==
Widnes by-election, 30 August 1919
Party		Candidate	Votes	%	±%
	Labour (Liberal)	Arthur Henderson	11,404	52.3	+11.9
C	Unionist	Frank Fisher	10,417	47.7	–11.9
Majority			987	4.6	N/A
Turnout			21,821	71.1	+8.1
Registered electors			30,674		
	Labour gain from Unionist		Swing	+11.9	

== Aftermath ==
Henderson would lose the seat at the next election to industrialist Christopher Clayton.
