= Mittelems (electoral district) =

Federal electoral district of Germany

31 Mittelems
- Electoral district for the Bundestag
- Mittelems in 2025
- State: Lower Saxony
- Population: 313,500 (2019)
- Electorate: 233,253 (2021)
- Major settlements: Lingen; Nordhorn; Meppen
- Area: 2,353.4 km^{2}

Current electoral district
- Created: 1980
- Party: CDU
- Member: Albert Stegemann
- Elected: 2013, 2017, 2021, 2025

Mittelems is an electoral constituency (German: Wahlkreis) represented in the Bundestag. It elects one member via first-past-the-post voting. Under the current constituency numbering system, it is designated as constituency 31. It is located in western Lower Saxony, comprising the Grafschaft Bentheim district and the southern part of the Emsland district.

Mittelems was created for the 1980 federal election. Since 2013, it has been represented by Albert Stegemann of the Christian Democratic Union (CDU).

== Geography ==
Mittelems is located in western Lower Saxony. As of the 2021 federal election, it comprises the entirety of the Grafschaft Bentheim district and the southern part of the Emsland district, specifically the municipalities of Emsbüren, Geeste, Haselünne, Lingen, Meppen, and Salzbergen, as well as the Samtgemeinden of Freren, Herzlake, Lengerich, and Spelle.

== History ==
Mittelems was created in 1980 and contained parts of the abolished constituencies of Emsland and Lingen. Until the 2002 election, it was constituency number 26. From then until 2013, it was constituency 32. Since 2013, it has been constituency 31. Its borders have not changed since its creation.

== Members ==
The constituency has been held continuously by the Christian Democratic Union (CDU) since its creation. Its first representative was Burkhard Ritz, who served a single term. He was succeeded by Hans-Gerd Strube, who served until 1994, followed by Hermann Kues. In 2013, Albert Stegemann was elected representative. He was re-elected in 2017 and 2021.

Election	Member	Party	%
1980	Burkhard Ritz	CDU	54.4
1983	Hans-Gerd Strube	CDU	60.0
1987	Hans-Gerd Strube	CDU	54.8
1990	Hans-Gerd Strube	CDU	57.2
1994	Hermann Kues	CDU	57.0
1998	Hermann Kues	CDU	53.3
2002	Hermann Kues	CDU	53.3
2005	Hermann Kues	CDU	55.6
2009	Hermann Kues	CDU	54.6
2013	Albert Stegemann	CDU	59.0
2017	Albert Stegemann	CDU	53.6
2021	Albert Stegemann	CDU	40.5
2025	Albert Stegemann	CDU	43.8

== Election results ==
=== 2025 election ===
Federal election (2025): Mittelems
Notes:	Blue background denotes the winner of the electorate vote. Pink background denotes a candidate elected from their party list. Yellow background denotes an electorate win by a list member, or other incumbent. A ✓ or ✗ denotes status of any incumbent, win or lose respectively.						
Party	Candidate	Votes	%	±%	Party votes	%	±%
CDU	✓ Albert Stegemann	86,795	43.8	▲3.3	78,008	39.3	▲5.4
SPD	Daniela De Ridder	48,525	24.5	▼4.7	42,166	21.2	▼9.7
AfD	Danny Meiners	27,994	14.1	▲9.1	28,483	14.3	▲9.2
Greens	Jeremy Zgrzebski	14,462	7.3	▼5.3	17,256	8.7	▼3.9
Left	Dirk Wörsdörfer	10,171	5.1	▲2.9	12,609	6.3	▲4.1
FDP	Jens Beeck	6,904	3.5	▼6.3	8,921	4.5	▼7.3
BSW					5,817	2.9	
Tierschutzpartei					1,618	0.8	▼0.1
FW	Eva Maria Wintering	2,833	1,4		1,267	0.6	▲0.2
PARTEI					764	0.4	▼0.5
Volt					729	0.4	▲0.2
dieBasis					336	0.2	▼0.4
BD	Ingo Dorendorf	635	0.3		287	0.1	
Pirates					222	0.1	▼0.1
Humanists					103	0.1	0.0
MLPD					28	0.0	0.0
Informal votes		1,210			915		
Total valid votes		198,319			198,614		
Turnout		199,529	85.3	▲7.9			
CDU hold	Majority	38,270	19.3	▲8.0			

=== 2021 election ===
Federal election (2021): Mittelems
Notes:	Blue background denotes the winner of the electorate vote. Pink background denotes a candidate elected from their party list. Yellow background denotes an electorate win by a list member, or other incumbent. A ✓ or ✗ denotes status of any incumbent, win or lose respectively.						
Party	Candidate	Votes	%	±%	Party votes	%	±%
CDU	✓ Albert Stegemann	72,523	40.5	▼13.2	60,733	33.8	▼15.5
SPD	Daniela De Ridder (Note: De Ridder entered the Bundestag on the SPD list after the resignation of Yasmin Fahimi in May 2022.)	52,309	29.2	▲2.8	55,461	30.9	▲7.4
Greens	Everhard Hüseman	22,562	12.6	▲7.6	22,515	12.5	▲6.5
FDP	Jens Beeck	17,466	9.7	▲4.1	21,101	11.8	▲2.7
AfD	Danny Meiners	8,993	5.0	0.0	9,235	5.1	▼0.3
Left	Helmuth Hoffmann	3,996	2.2	▼1.6	3,969	2.2	▼2.4
Tierschutzpartei					1,592	0.9	▲0.4
PARTEI					1,521	0.8	▲0.3
dieBasis	Mario Kehl	1,364	0.8		1,070	0.6	
FW					723	0.4	▲0.3
Pirates					423	0.2	0.0
Team Todenhöfer					291	0.2	
Volt					243	0.1	
Humanists					132	0.1	
NPD					107	0.1	▼0.1
ÖDP					97	0.1	▼0.1
du.					90	0.1	
V-Partei3					74	0.0	0.0
LKR					23	0.0	
DKP					22	0.0	0.0
MLPD					17	0.0	0.0
Informal votes		1,330			1,104		
Total valid votes		179,213			179,439		
Turnout		180,543	77.4	▼0.7			
CDU hold	Majority	20,214	11.3	▼15.9			

=== 2017 election ===
Federal election (2017): Mittelems
Notes:	Blue background denotes the winner of the electorate vote. Pink background denotes a candidate elected from their party list. Yellow background denotes an electorate win by a list member, or other incumbent. A ✓ or ✗ denotes status of any incumbent, win or lose respectively.						
Party	Candidate	Votes	%	±%	Party votes	%	±%
CDU	✓ Albert Stegemann	95,815	53.6	▼5.4	88,310	49.4	▼6.7
SPD	Daniela De Ridder	47,107	26.4	▼2.6	41,983	23.5	▼2.6
FDP	Jens Beeck	10,089	5.6	▲4.1	16,181	9.0	▲4.9
AfD	Danny Meiners	8,949	5.0	▲2.8	9,701	5.4	▲2.9
Greens	Reinhard Prüllage	8,900	5.0	0.0	10,803	6.0	▲0.6
Left	Roberto Linguari	6,813	3.8	▲1.1	8,167	4.6	▲1.5
PARTEI	Harald Nützel	951	0.5		984	0.6	
Tierschutzpartei					939	0.5	▲0.1
Pirates					385	0.2	▼1.2
NPD					285	0.2	▼0.3
FW					271	0.2	0.0
ÖDP					238	0.1	
DM					146	0.1	
BGE					136	0.1	
DiB					134	0.1	
V-Partei³					127	0.1	
MLPD					35	0.0	0.0
DKP					27	0.0	
Informal votes		1,187			959		
Total valid votes		178,624			178,852		
Turnout		179,811	78.1	▲3.4			
CDU hold	Majority	48,708	27.2	▼2.8			

=== 2013 election ===
Federal election (2013): Mittelems
Notes:	Blue background denotes the winner of the electorate vote. Pink background denotes a candidate elected from their party list. Yellow background denotes an electorate win by a list member, or other incumbent. A ✓ or ✗ denotes status of any incumbent, win or lose respectively.						
Party	Candidate	Votes	%	±%	Party votes	%	±%
CDU	Albert Stegemann	99,705	59.0	▲4.4	94,923	56.1	▲8.9
SPD	Daniela De Ridder	48,903	29.0	▲3.0	44,069	26.0	▲2.7
Greens	Birgit Kemmer	8,393	5.0	▼0.9	9,160	5.4	▼1.4
Left	Heinz Georg von Wensiersky	4,543	2.7	▼2.2	5,107	3.0	▼2.5
AfD	Martina Härting	3,777	2.2		4,331	2.6	
FDP	Manuel Nehmer	2,673	1.6	▼6.4	7,032	4.2	▼10.0
Pirates					2,456	1.5	▲0.1
NPD	Tobias Richter	879	0.5	▼0.2	790	0.5	▼0.1
Tierschutzpartei					767	0.5	▼0.1
FW					285	0.2	
PRO					136	0.1	
PBC					114	0.1	
REP					48	0.0	
MLPD					20	0.0	0.0
Informal votes		1,571			1,206		
Total valid votes		168,873			169,238		
Turnout		170,444	74.7	▲0.2			
CDU hold	Majority	50,802	30.0	▲1.4			

=== 2009 election ===
Federal election (2009): Mittelems
Notes:	Blue background denotes the winner of the electorate vote. Pink background denotes a candidate elected from their party list. Yellow background denotes an electorate win by a list member, or other incumbent. A ✓ or ✗ denotes status of any incumbent, win or lose respectively.						
Party	Candidate	Votes	%	±%	Party votes	%	±%
CDU	✓ Hermann Kues	91,378	54.6	▼1.0	79,052	47.2	▼1.5
SPD	Dieter Steinecke	43,503	26.0	▼8.5	39,085	23.3	▼10.6
FDP	Norbert Brüggemann	13,278	7.9	▲4.5	23,749	14.2	▲5.7
Greens	Michael Fuest	9,819	5.9	▲2.6	11,357	6.8	▲2.2
Left	Jörg-Friedrich Küster	8,195	4.9	▲2.5	9,169	5.5	▲2.7
Pirates					2,347	1.4	
NPD	Malte Holzer	1,130	0.7	0.0	1,014	0.6	▼0.1
Tierschutzpartei					853	0.5	▲0.1
RRP					642	0.4	
ÖDP					158	0.1	
DVU					78	0.0	
MLPD					24	0.0	0.0
Informal votes		1,775			1,550		
Total valid votes		167,303			167,528		
Turnout		169,078	74.5	▼6.2			
CDU hold	Majority	47,875	28.6	▲7.5			

=== 2005 election ===
Federal election (2005):Mittelems
Notes:	Blue background denotes the winner of the electorate vote. Pink background denotes a candidate elected from their party list. Yellow background denotes an electorate win by a list member, or other incumbent. A ✓ or ✗ denotes status of any incumbent, win or lose respectively.						
Party	Candidate	Votes	%	±%	Party votes	%	±%
CDU	✓ Hermann Kues	98,882	55.6	▲2.4	86,520	48.7	0.0
SPD	Dieter Steinecke	61,236	34.5	▼3.2	60,408	34.0	▼4.0
FDP	Joachim Willems	6,167	3.5	▼1.3	15,042	8.5	▲1.5
Greens	Heiner Rehnen	5,848	3.3	▼0.4	8,212	4.6	▲0.1
Left	Jochen Kwast	4,315	2.4	▲1.7	4,897	2.8	▲2.2
NPD	Udo Stachowsky	1,287	0.7		1,237	0.7	▲0.5
Tierschutzpartei					761	0.4	▲0.1
GRAUEN					319	0.2	▲0.1
PBC					185	0.1	▼0.1
Pro German Center – Pro D-Mark Initiative					121	0.1	
BüSo					58	0.0	0.0
MLPD					30	0.0	
Informal votes		1,981			1,926		
Total valid votes		177,735			177,790		
Turnout		179,716	80.7	▼1.5			
CDU hold	Majority	37,646	21.1				
