= Davey Hall =

British trade unionist

Davey Hall (born 1951) is a British trade unionist.

Hall worked as an engineer at the Swan Hunter shipbuilding yard. He joined the Amalgamated Engineering Union (AEU), and became a shop steward. In 1988, he became the union's Tyne district secretary.

The AEU became part of the Amalgamated Engineering and Electrical Union (AEEU), and Hall served as its president from 1995 to 1998; although he was a supporter of Tony Blair, he was described as the union's most left-wing president since Hugh Scanlon. The AEEU then merged into Amicus, which in turn became part of Unite, with Hall serving as its regional secretary for the North East, Yorkshire and Humberside. He took early retirement in 2011, but later began working for the Prospect trade union, in a similar post.

Trade union offices
| Preceded by John Weakley | President of the Amalgamated Engineering and Electrical Union; 1996–1998 | Succeeded by Position abolished |
