= Bergkamen Power Station =

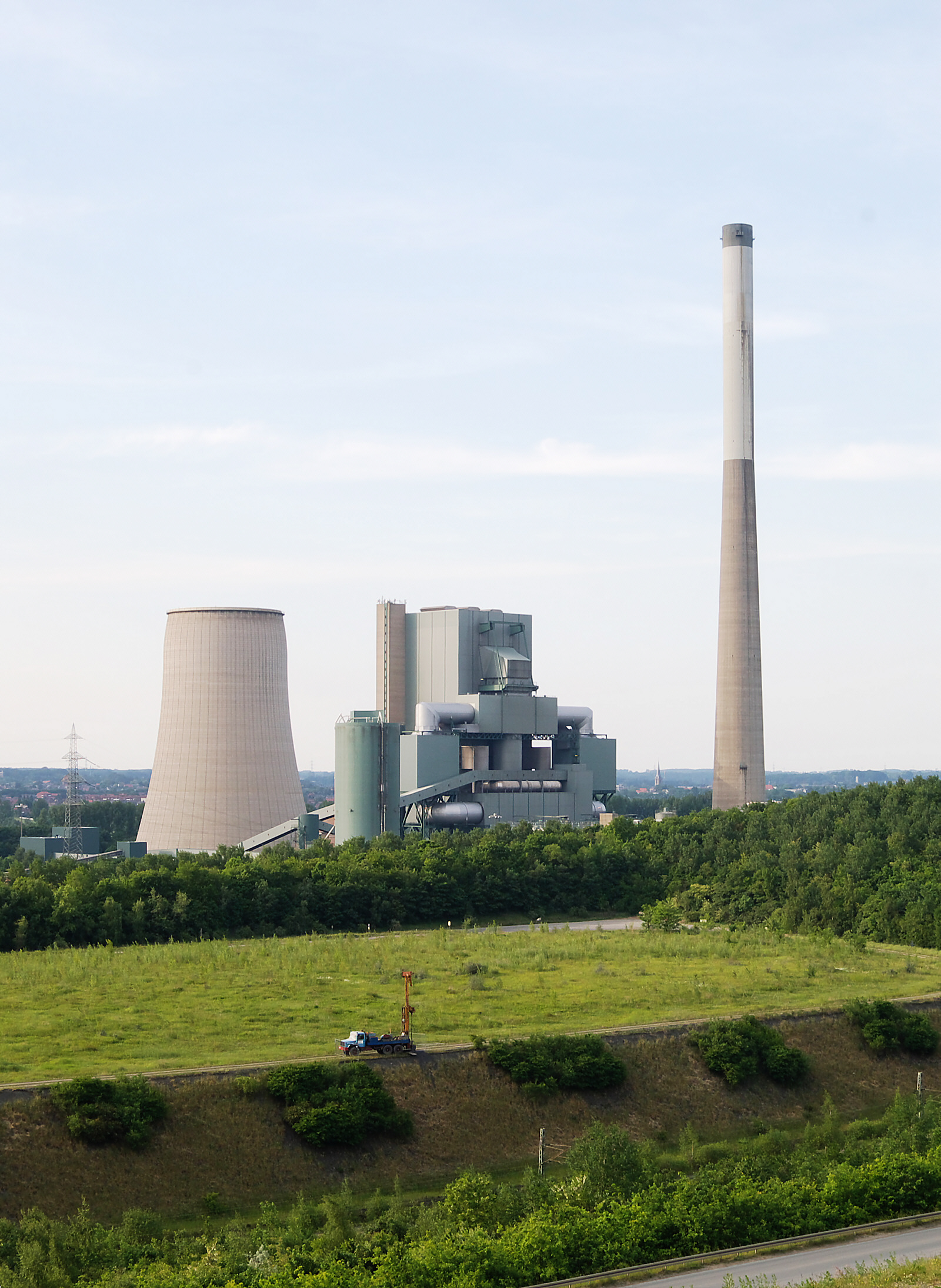
- Bergkamen Power Station
- Country: Germany
- Location: Bergkamen
- Coordinates: 51°38′13″N 7°37′8″E
- Status: Operational
- Commission date: 1981
- Owner: Evonik Industries
- Operators: RWE Generation; STEAG

Thermal power station
- Primary fuel: Coal

Power generation
- Nameplate capacity: 747 MW
- Annual net output: 4.8 billion kWh

External links
- Commons: Related media on Commons

Bergkamen Power Station is a coal-fired power station in Germany. It is located in the city of Bergkamen, in the Unna district. It began operations in 1981 and has an output capacity of 747 megawatts. The power station produces 4.8 billion kWh of electricity annually, and also provides long-distance heating through steam generation.

Annual hard coal consumption amounts to about 1.4 million tons. In October 2021, the station stopped temporarily due to a coal shortage. The power station is operated by Evonik Industries.

== Sources ==
- STEAG.com: Kraftwerk Bergkamen (in German)
- route-industriekultur.ruhr: Bergkamen (in German)
