= Michael Vassiliadis =

German trade unionist (born 1964)

Michael Zissis Vassiliadis (born 13 March 1964) is President of the Mining, Chemical and Energy Workers' Union (IG Bergbau, Chemie, Energie, IG BCE) in Germany and President of the European Confederation of Industrial Trade Unions IndustriAll Europe.

Born in Essen, Vassiliadis began working in 1980, as a laboratory technician for Bayer. He joined the Chemical, Paper and Ceramic Union, and in 1986 began working full-time for the union, as secretary of its Leverkusen office. He held various posts before, in 1997, the union became part of IG Bergbau, Chemie, Energie (IGB CE), and he became secretary of its board in Hannover.

In 2009, Vassiliadis was elected as president of the IGBCE, and in 2011 he additionally became president of the European Mine, Chemical and Energy Workers' Federation. In 2012, this became part of the new IndustriALL – European Trade Union, and Vassiliadis continued as president.

== Political positions ==
=== Trade union policy ===
Vassiliadis sees strikes as a last resort in negotiations with employers. The last strike in the chemical sector in Germany was in 1971. According to a study by the German Institute for Economic Research, real incomes in Germany fell by 4.2 per cent from 2000 to 2010, while they rose by 8.2 per cent in the Western region of the chemical industry.

=== Co-determination ===
Triggered by a conflict at the automotive supplier Continental, Vassiliadis launched an initiative in autumn 2020 to reform corporate co-determination with the aim of abolishing the double voting rights of the chairman of the supervisory board.

=== Transformation ===
Vassiliadis sees the most important task of the trade unions in shaping the transformation of society through digitisation and climate protection in a socially, economically, and ecologically sustainable way. In January 2021, Vassiliadis presented the model of a credit-financed transformation fund with a total volume of initially 120 billion euro, with which the federal government would take a share in climate-friendly projects and in companies particularly affected by the transformation, and promote start-ups and research and development.

=== Energy policy ===
Vassiliadis calls for a reform of the German Renewable Energy Sources Act (German: Erneuerbare-Energien-Gesetz, EEG). The costs of the energy turnaround should be financed entirely from the federal budget. The abolition of the EEG levy "would have a far more social effect than, for example, tax relief". In addition, in his view, industry needs a price guarantee for green electricity so that companies will remain internationally competitive and will not relocate capacities.

=== Climate policy ===
In the climate debate, Vassiliadis pleaded for a climate policy "with a cool head" in a guest article for the newspaper Die Welt in August 2019. "Ever more heated actions or even political climate strikes are not target-oriented." Instead, politicians, companies, trade unions and environmental associations should understand the climate-friendly transformation of the industrial location as the largest and most expensive undertaking since the founding of the Federal Republic of Germany, and Germany should make "Made in Germany" a global brand for climate-neutral cutting-edge technology.

=== Phase out of coal ===
As a member of the German government's Commission on Growth, Structural Change and Employment, Vassiliadis helped negotiate the phase-out of coal-fired power generation. The phase-out was later approved by a majority of both houses of the German parliament on 3 July 2020. Environmental associations criticise what they see as excessive compensation for lignite operators and the duration of the phase-out: half of the lignite capacity would not be shut down until between 2035 and 2038. Vassiliadis, on the other hand, defends the compromise reached: 'The agreement now at least gives us legal certainty – and that is a great asset.' Vassiliadis sees the reason for the long phase-out period in failures in the expansion of renewable energies, which is in his opinion "clearly behind schedule". He calls for greater harmonisation of the phase-out and expansion schedules. In addition, the regions affected by the coal phase-out would receive 40 billion euro in financial support for structural change. Vassiliadis also pleads for a massive expansion of hydrogen technology.

=== Electromobility ===
In July 2020, Vassiliadis criticised what he saw as an overly unspecific orientation of the SPD in the relationship between work and the environment with regard to the transformation of the car industry. Electromobility was being put "too much in the shop window". The capacities of e-car production were far from sufficient to solve the employment problems. He therefore called for direct support from the state and carmakers, especially for the supplier industry.

=== COVID crisis ===
In the COVID crisis, Vassiliadis demanded in April 2020 that employers should participate in the planned increase in short-time allowances by the Federal Employment Agency. "This burden must not be placed unilaterally on the Federal Employment Agency. We expect well-heeled corporations in our industry to pass on these [...] subsidies to the workers who are on extensive short-time work."

After problems arose in the pandemic, first with the supply of medicines and later with the supply of vaccines, Vassiliadis advocated for a European pharmaceutical pact in which all relevant players in the health industry, politics and social partners come together and agree on concrete concepts for strengthening the industry. "We now need a coordinated approach across Europe to promote cutting-edge research, secure value chains and mass production."

Vassiliadis sees the massive expansion of remote work in the Covid crisis as a challenge to co-determination and internal democracy. The trade unions' right of access to the company and its employees is sometimes undermined because companies block the trade unions' digital access. Vassiliadis demands: "Employers must enable trade unions to engage in dialogue with employees via their company email addresses, company intranets and virtual bulletin boards."

=== Managerial salaries ===
At the end of March 2017, Vassiliadis contradicted SPD party leader Martin Schulz with regard to the limitation of managerial salaries. Speaking to the dpa news agency, he called one of the central SPD campaign issues for the 2017 general election absurd: "I think the proposal to have the annual general meeting vote on the remuneration of the board of directors is nonsense." Vassiliadis thus became the first trade union leader to distance himself from the SPD, which demands that top management salaries be capped by the annual general meeting.

According to Vassiliadis, the Government Commission on the German Corporate Governance Code should 'determine how high the salary of a board member should be compared to the average earnings of an employee in the same company'.

== Career ==
Vassiliadis is the son of a German mother and a Greek father. From 1980 to 1983, he trained as a chemical laboratory assistant at Bayer AG in Dormagen and, after completing his training, worked in this profession until 1986.

In 1980, he became a member of the Chemical, Paper and Ceramics Workers' Union (IG Chemie-Papier-Keramik, IG CPK) and has been a member of the Social-Democratic Party (SPD) since 1981. Since joining IG CPK, Michael Vassiliadis has held numerous voluntary positions at local, state and national level. He was a rapporteur in trade union education work, chairman of the youth representation and member of the group youth representation of Bayer AG, member of the advisory board and various collective bargaining commissions as well as a delegate to trade union congresses.

He began his full-time trade union activities in 1986, initially as secretary of IG Chemie-Papier-Keramik in its Leverkusen administrative office, then from 1990 in the North Rhine-Westphalia district and from 1994 to 1997 as managing director of the Leverkusen administrative office. In 1997 Michael Vassiliadis became Executive Secretary of the new IG Bergbau, Chemie, Energie and headed the Chairman/Human Resources Department at the head office in Hanover. From March 2004 to October 2009, he was a member of the executive board of IG BCE and during this time was responsible for works councils, education, youth and shop stewards/local groups. Vassiliadis was elected to succeed Hubertus Schmoldt as President of IG BCE in 2009. He was confirmed in this position at the IG BCE trade union congresses in October 2013 with 99.2%, in October 2017 with 97.7% and again in October 2021 at the 7th Ordinary Trade Union Congress with 97.4% of the delegate votes. The son of a Greek immigrant, he is the first person with an immigrant background to head a German trade union since his election as chair in 2009. IG BCE is the third largest trade union in Germany with around 600,000 members (as of 2024).

Since 2012, Vassiliadis has been President of IndustriAll Europe, the European umbrella organisation of industrial trade unions in Europe. From June 2007 to November 2016, Michael Vassiliadis was a member of the German government's Council for Sustainable Development. From March 2011 to May 2011, he was a member of the Ethics Commission for Secure Energy Supply. From June 2018 to February 2019, he was a member of the German Government's Commission on Growth, Structural Change and Employment. Since June 2020, he has been a member of the National Hydrogen Council.

Vassiliadis is chairman of the board of the Energy Turnaround Innovation Forum. He is a member of the senate of acatech (German Academy of Engineering Sciences), a member of the presidium of BAPP (Bonn Academy for Researching and Teaching of Practical Politics) and a member of the advisory board of the Ruhr Initiative Group. Furthermore, he is a member of the CSR Forum of the Federal Government and the Board of Trustees of the relief organization CARE Germany.

He has been deputy chairman of the supervisory board of RAG AG since May 2014, a member of the supervisory board of Steag (Essen), since May 2018 at Henkel (Düsseldorf) and since August 2004 at BASF (Ludwigshafen). He is deputy chairman of the Board of Trustees of the RAG Foundation. He is also chairman of the board of the IG BCE Foundation for Work and the Environment, a senator of the German National Foundation and a member of the advisory board of the German-Turkish Society and the Association of German-Greek Societies.

== Personal life ==
Michael Vassiliadis is married to Yasmin Fahimi, a graduate chemist, former Secretary General of the SPD, former state secretary in the Federal Ministry of Labour, former member of the German parliament and since 2022 Chair of the German Trade Union Federation (DGB). Michael Vassiliadis has two sons from his first marriage.

== Awards ==
Michael Vassiliadis was awarded the German Federal Cross of Merit 1st Class in 2022. The Diocese of Essen also awarded him the Heinrich Brauns Prize in 2022.

In 2018, he received the Social Market Economy Award of the Fasel Foundation together with Bernd Tönjes, chairman of the board of the RAG Foundation. The foundation cited 'the successful structural change through the process of the socially acceptable exit from coal mining' as the reason for the award.

== Publications ==
- Christian Kullmann, Gunda Röstel, Michael Vassiliadis (eds.): 1,5 Grad. Gemeinsam. Nachhaltig. Handeln. (1.5 degrees. Act. Together. Sustainably.). Hamburg 2022, Murmann Verlag, ISBN 978-3-86774-742-4
- Michael Vassiliadis: Für den Fortschritt: Industriepolitik für das 21. Jahrhundert (For Progress: Industrial Policy for the 21st Century). Berlin 2010, Berliner Vorwärts Verlagsgesellschaft, ISBN 978-3-86602-891-3
- Klaus Engel, Michael Vassiliadis (eds.): Werte Wissen Wachstum: Was Deutschland tun muss (Values Knowledge Growth: What Germany Must Do). 2010, Hoffmann und Campe, ISBN 978-3-455-50171-1
- Michael Vassiliadis, Kajsa Borgnäs (eds.): Nachhaltige Industriepolitik: Strategien für Deutschland und Europa (Sustainable Industrial Policy: Strategies for Germany and Europe). Frankfurt 2020, Campus Verlag, ISBN 978-3-593-51260-0

Trade union offices
Preceded by Hubertus Schmoldt	President of IG Bergbau, Chemie, Energie; 2009–present	Succeeded by Incumbent
Preceded by Hubertus Schmoldt	President of the European Mine, Chemical and Energy Workers' Federation; 2011–2012	Succeeded by Federation merged
Preceded by Federation founded	President of IndustriALL – European Trade Union; 2012–present	Succeeded by Incumbent
