= Jack Whyman =

British union leader (1925–2011)

John Robert Whyman, known as Jack Whyman (16 August 1925 – 23 August 2011) was a British trade union leader.

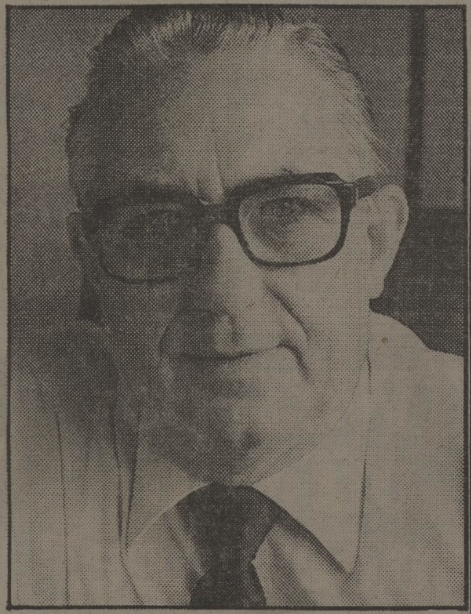
Jack Whyman, 1984

Whyman was born in East London. After service in the Royal Navy, he joined the Amalgamated Engineering Union (AEU). He was a member of the Watford District Committee for seven years, before working full-time for the union as an Assistant Divisional Organiser (1964 to 1977), and then as Divisional Organiser for two years, focusing on negotiations in the aerospace, motor and engineering industries.

He was associated with the right wing of the union, and in 1979, he was elected to the Executive Council, representing London and the South East. This was the EC7 seat which had previously been held by communists continuously since 1942: Joe Scott, Claude Berridge and then Reg Birch.

In August 1984, Whyman was named as 'the man most likely to succeed' in the search for the right-wing candidate to succeed Terry Duffy as union President - but the nomination went to Bill Jordan instead

In 1983, the General Council of the Trades Union Congress was reorganised, with the AEU guaranteed four seats, and Whyman was given one of them. Although he was dropped the following year, he was reappointed in 1985. He was also prominent in the Confederation of Shipbuilding and Engineering Unions, serving as its president in 1989/90.

Whyman retired from his trade union posts in 1990, being replaced on the AEU's executive by the left-winger Roger Butler.

Trade union offices
Preceded by Ken Gill	President of the Confederation of Shipbuilding and Engineering Unions; 1989–1990	Succeeded by John Weakley
