= European Trade Union Federation for Textiles, Clothing and Leather =

European trade union federation (1970–2012)

The European Trade Union Federation for Textiles, Clothing and Leather (ETUF-TCL) was a European trade union federation.

In 1963, trade unions in European Economic Community member countries established a joint research and information bureau. In 1970, they formed the European Union Committee for Textiles, Clothing and Leather. It refused to admit the Italian Federation of Textile and Garment Workers, which was influenced by the Italian Communist Party, and this led the European Trade Union Confederation not to recognise the federation. Recognition was finally obtained in 1988, and the first congress was held in 1993. In 1997, it took its final name. By 1999, it had 47 affiliates with a total of 1.4 million members.

On 16 May 2012, the federation merged with the European Metalworkers' Federation and the European Mine, Chemical and Energy Workers' Federation, to form IndustriALL – European Trade Union.

== Leadership ==
=== General Secretaries ===
1991: Patrick Itschert
2011: Luc Triangle

=== Presidents ===
Berthold Huber
2001: Valeria Fedeli
