= John Weakley =

British trade unionist (1940–1995)

John Weakley (20 March 1940 – 23 January 1995) was a British trade unionist, who became acting president of the Amalgamated Engineering and Electrical Union.

Born in Swansea, Weakley completed an apprenticeship as a toolmaker with British Aerospace in Bristol, and joined the Amalgamated Engineering Union (AEU). He became a shop steward at Westland Helicopters, and slowly came to prominence in the union, associated with its right wing. In the mid-1970s, he took the union's president, Hugh Scanlon, to the High Court, successfully arguing that Scanlon should not use his casting vote in favour of the left wing of the union's executive.

Following his success in court, the right gained control of leading positions in the AEU, starting with John Boyd's 1975 election as general secretary. Weakley stood to become the national organiser, but was defeated by Laurie Smith. Only in 1977 did he begin working full-time for the union, as its Wales and South West England District Secretary, then in 1979 he was elected to the union's executive committee. He was also made the union's chief negotiator with British Aerospace, British Steel and GEC.

In 1985, Weakley was elected to the General Council of the Trades Union Congress (TUC). The following year, he hoped to become the president of the AEU, but the union's right-wing instead backed the more junior Bill Jordan. He thereafter focused on the TUC, becoming a founder member of its executive committee in 1994, and on the Confederation of Shipbuilding and Engineering Unions, serving as president in 1990/91.

Jordan stood down as president of the AEU's successor, the Amalgamated Engineering and Electrical Union, late in 1994, and as the longest-serving member of the union's executive, Weakley was appointed as acting president. He announced his intention to run for the post, but died before the election took place.

Trade union offices
Preceded by Jack Whyman	President of the Confederation of Shipbuilding and Engineering Unions; 1990–1991	Succeeded by Charlie Kelly
Preceded by Bill Jordan	Acting President of the Amalgamated Engineering and Electrical Union; 1994–1995	Succeeded by Davey Hall
