= Yasmin Fahimi =

German politician (born 1967)

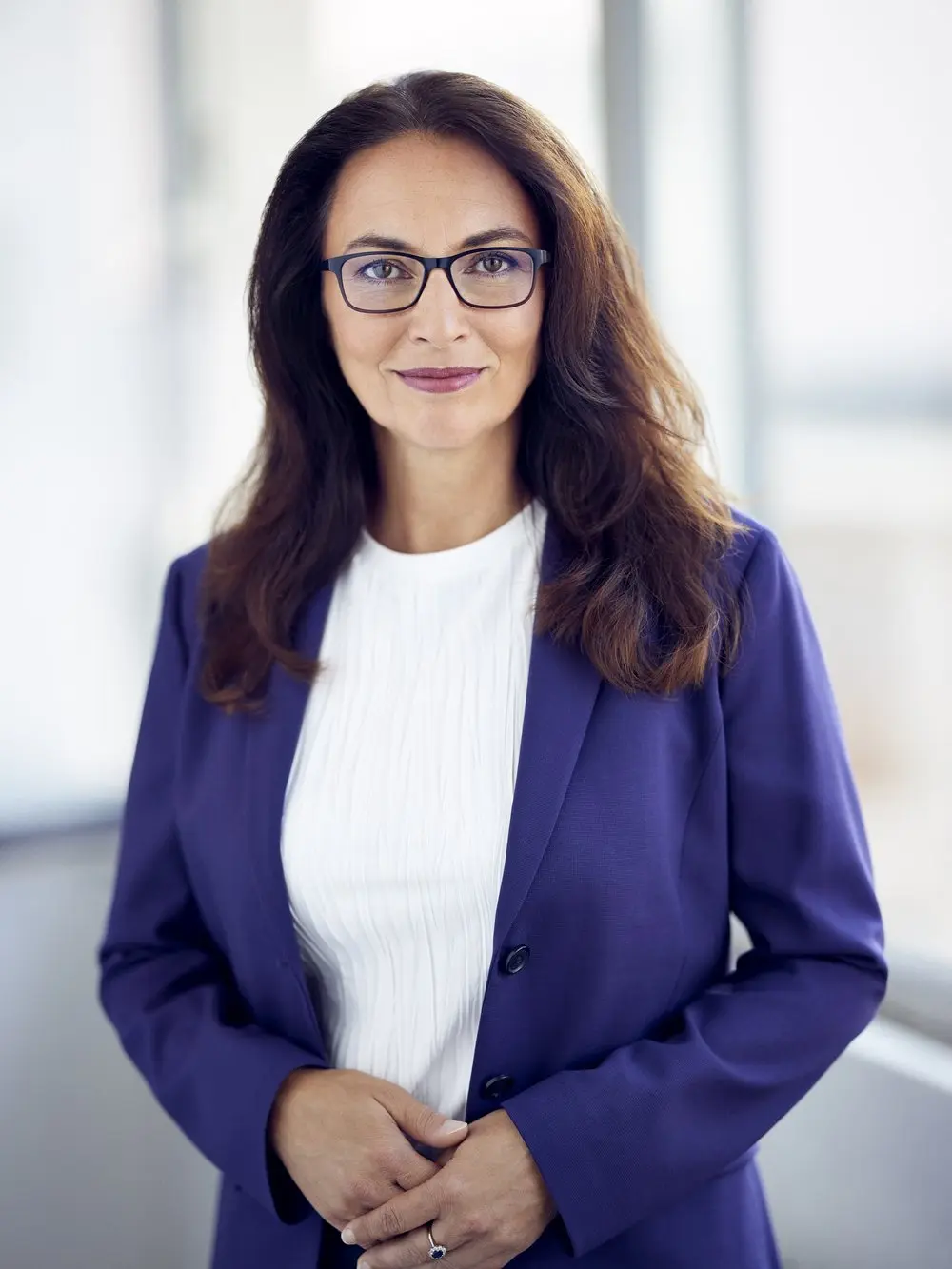
- Fahimi in 2022

President of the DGB
- Incumbent
- Assumed office 9 May 2022
- Preceded by: Reiner Hoffmann

State Secretary for the Minister of Labour and Social Affairs
- In office 1 January 2016 – 28 September 2017
- Minister: Andrea Nahles
- Preceded by: Jörg Asmussen
- Succeeded by: Björn Böhning

Member of the Bundestag; for Stadt Hannover II
- In office 24 October 2017 – 30 May 2022
- Preceded by: Edelgard Bulmahn
- Succeeded by: Daniela De Ridder

General Secretary of the Social Democratic Party
- In office 26 January 2014 – 11 December 2015
- Leader: Sigmar Gabriel
- Preceded by: Andrea Nahles
- Succeeded by: Katarina Barley

Personal details
- Born: 25 December 1967 (age 58) Hanover, West Germany
- Party: Social Democratic
- Education: Leibniz University Hannover

Yasmin Fahimi (born 25 December 1967) is a German trade unionist and politician who has been chairing the German Trade Union Confederation (DGB) since 2022.

From 2017 to 2022, Fahimi served as a member of the German Bundestag. From January 2014 to December 2015 she was the general secretary of the Social Democratic Party (SPD).

== Early life and education ==
Fahimi was born in Hanover. Her Iranian father died in a traffic collision before she was born; her mother is German. Her mother's family comes from East Prussia and fled during World War II. Fahimi has one older brother who was born in Tehran. Fahimi's mother, who was employed at the Ministry of Justice, raised the children alone.

Fahimi studied chemistry at the University of Hanover from 1989 to 1998.

== Early career ==
Between 1998 and 2014, Fahimi worked in various capacities at the IG Bergbau, Chemie, Energie. From 2012, she also served as founder and board member of the Innovationsforum Energiewende, a group convening unions and companies from the energy sector and energy-intensive industries.

== Political career ==
Fahimi has been a member of the Social Democratic Party since 1986. She was a member of the federal executive board of the party's youth organization and from 2009 to 2013 deputy chairwoman of the SPD in Hannover.

In a special party conference on 26 January 2014 Fahimi was elected with 88.5% of the votes to be Secretary General of the SPD under party chairman Sigmar Gabriel, and therefore successor of Andrea Nahles. By late 2015, Gabriel replaced her with Katarina Barley.

From 2016 until 2018, Fahimi served as State Secretary at the Federal Ministry of Labour and Social Affairs under the leadership of minister Andrea Nahles. In this capacity, she oversaw the ministry's activities on occupational safety and health; pensions; matters concerning people with disabilities; and international employment and social policy (including relations with the International Labour Organization).

=== Member of the German Parliament (2017–2022) ===
In November 2016, Fahimi announced that she would run for a parliamentary seat in the 2017 national elections.

In parliament, Fahimi served on the Committee on Education, Research and Technology Assessment. As deputy member of the Committee on Foreign Affairs, she was her parliamentary group's rapporteur on relations to Latin America, the Caribbean, Spain, Portugal, Italy and Malta. In addition to her committee assignments, she chaired the German-Brazilian Parliamentary Friendship Group from 2018. Within the SPD parliamentary group, she belonged to the Parliamentary Left, a left-wing movement.

In the negotiations to form a so-called traffic light coalition of the SPD, the Green Party and the Free Democratic Party (FDP) following the 2021 federal elections, Fahimi was part of her party's delegation in the working group on labor policy, co-chaired by Hubertus Heil, Katharina Dröge and Johannes Vogel.

== Chair of DGB (2022–present) ==
In 2021 German Trade Union Confederation (DGB) was looking for a woman to chair the organization. Fahimi's partner, Michael Vassiliadis, head of IG Bergbau, Chemie, Energie, made himself available for the office but was eventually opposed by ver.di, one of the main unions in DGB. Finally, Fahimi met with great approval among all trade unions. She was nominated in January 2022 as new chair of DGB.

== Other activities ==
=== Corporate boards ===
- KfW, Member of the Board of Supervisory Directors (since 2023)
- Telefónica Germany, Member of the supervisory board (since 2023)
- Bayer, Member of the supervisory board (since 2022)

=== Non-profit organizations ===
- Hans Böckler Foundation, chair of the Board (since 2022)
- German Future Prize, Member of the Board of Trustees (since 2022)
- Federal Agency for Disruptive Innovation (SPRIN-D), Member of the supervisory board (2020–2022)
- Deutsche Industrieforschungsgemeinschaft Konrad Zuse, Member of the Senate
- IG Bergbau, Chemie, Energie, Member
