= Evonik Industries =

Stock-listed German specialty chemicals company

Evonik Industries AG

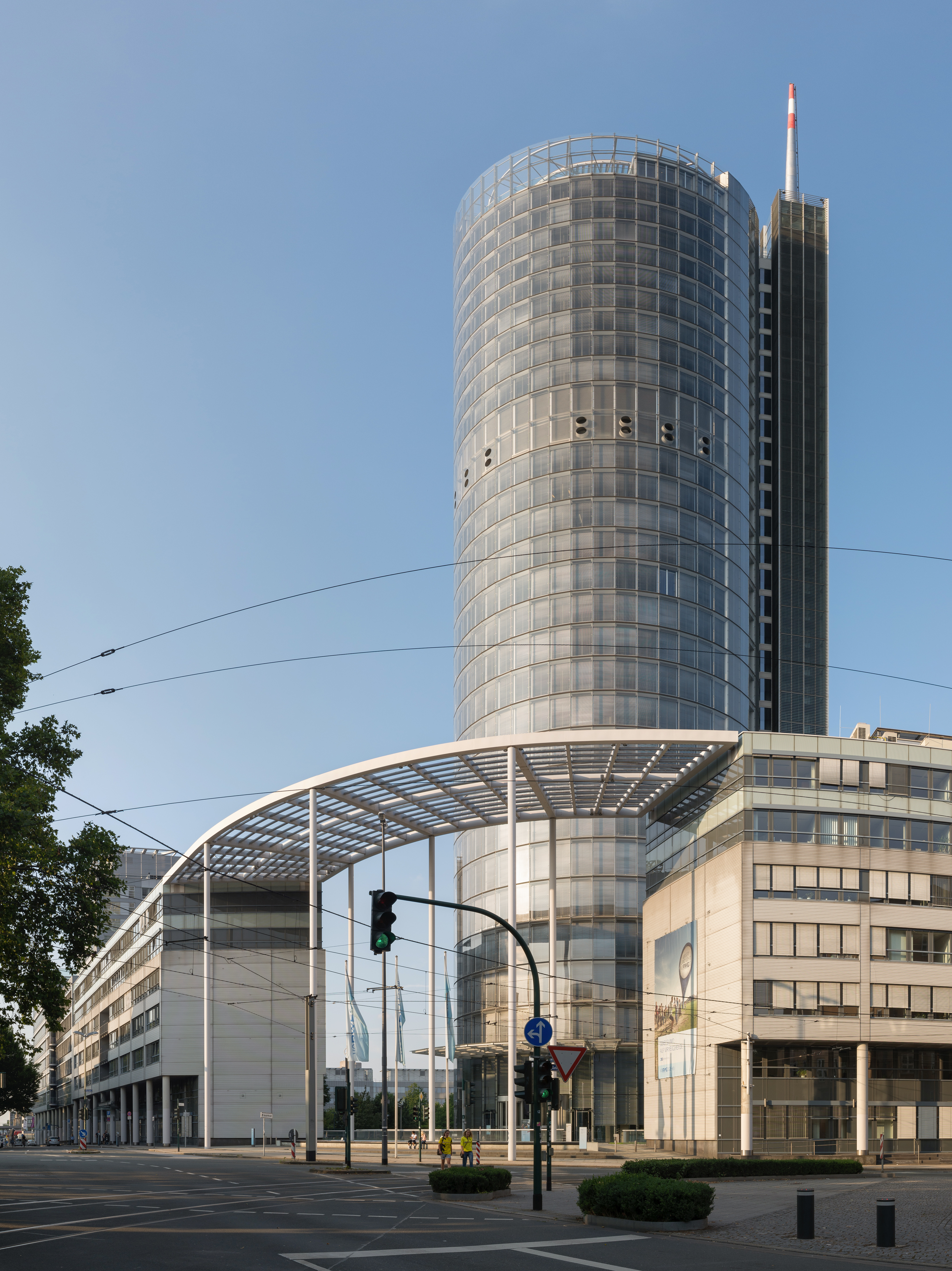
- Evonik's headquarter in Essen, Germany
- Type: Aktiengesellschaft
- Traded as: FWB: EVK; MDAX Component
- Industry: Specialty chemicals
- Founded: 2007; 19 years ago
- Headquarters: Essen, Germany
- Key people: Christian Kullmann, (CEO, Chairman); Lauren Kjeldsen, Claudine Mollenkopf, Michael Rauch, Dr. Claus Rettig, (Deputy Chairman) Thomas Wessel; Bernd Tönjes (Chairman of the supervisory board)
- Products: Chemicals
- Revenue: ▼€14.1 billion (2025)
- Net income: ▼€265 million (2025)
- Number of employees: 31,053 (2025)
- Website: www.evonik.com/en.html

Evonik Industries AG is a publicly listed German chemicals company headquartered in Essen, North Rhine-Westphalia, Germany. It is the second-largest chemicals company in Germany, and one of the largest specialty chemicals companies in the world. It is predominantly owned by the RAG Foundation and was founded on 12 September 2007 as a result of restructuring of the mining and technology group RAG AG.

Evonik Industries united the business areas of chemicals, energy and real estate of RAG, while mining operations continue to be carried out by RAG. Since then, the energy and real estate business areas have been divested, with no share being held in the former and a minority share still being held in the latter.

Its specialty chemicals business generates around 80% of sales in areas where it holds leading market positions. Evonik Industries employs about 31,000 people and carries out activities in more than 100 countries. The operating business lines are bundled within three segments Customs Solutions, Advanced Technologies and Infrastructure. These business lines are assigned to their respective segments:

Custom Solutions: Care Solutions, Catalysts, Coating Additives, Coating & Adhesive Resins, Health Care, Interface & Polyethane Additives and Oil Additives.

Advances Technologies: Active Oxygens, Animal Nutrition, Crosslinkers, High Performance Polymers and Smart Effects.

Infrastructure: Evonik Oxeno as well as SYNEQT.

Up until 2025 Evonik was a main sponsor of the German football club Borussia Dortmund and now is Champion Partner.

In 2022, Evonik's surfactant and specialty esters operations were acquired by Kensing.

== History ==
=== World War II and involvement in the Holocaust ===
During World War II, one of Degussa's (Deutsche Gold- und Silber-Scheide-Anstalt, "German Gold and Silver Refining") subsidiaries, Degesch (translation: German Corporation for Pest Control), was the main manufacturer and distributor of the chemical Zyklon B, which was used to murder people in gas chambers of German extermination and concentration camps during the Holocaust. Gold dental fillings, which had been forcefully removed from the mouths of concentration-camp inmates, were processed by Degussa. The company's partnership Deutsche Gasrusswerke (DGW) employed Jewish slave laborers at the Gleiwitz concentration camp, a subcamp of Auschwitz. Degussa estimated its war losses at 111 million Reichsmark, almost US$0.5 billion in 2012 dollars.

While constructing the Holocaust Memorial in Berlin, it became public that the plasticizer and the anti-graffiti coating of the memorial were produced by Degussa, resulting in a pause of the construction works until the matter was clarified. In November 2003, the memorial's trustees decided to finish the building with the involvement of Degussa.

=== After World War II ===
In 2006, RAG acquired Degussa AG, which was later renamed Evonik-Degussa GmbH.

Historically, Evonik Industries' businesses were part of RAG activities. The idea of splitting the company was put forward in 2005. The background of this idea was that RAG's core business of coal mining is carried out under government contract in Germany, while businesses transferred to Evonik compete in international markets. This structure did not permit the payment of dividends to the shareholders, which limited shareholders' readiness to inject equity into the RAG, which thereby restricted the company's ability to access fresh capital. As the first step, RAG's shareholders sold their shares to RAG foundation (RAG-Stiftung) to split RAG.

The Foundation was established on 10 July 2007, and Evonik Industries was created on 12 September 2007.

The original plan foresaw the IPO of Evonik Industries in the first half of 2008. However, this plan was postponed until mid-2010 at the earliest, and the RAG Foundation started to look for strategic investors, while still holding on to the plans for a midterm IPO. In June 2008, the private equity firm CVC Capital Partners bought a stake of 25.01% in the company. Among many other private equity investors who bid for the stake (amongst them Blackstone Group and 3i), Russian Gazprom was reported to have considered buying a stake in Evonik Industries. The IPO, by now planned for fall of 2011, was once again postponed in September 2011, this time citing the "current state of financial and capital markets and their prospects." RAG Foundation had planned for Evonik's IPO to take place in 2012, but this was postponed as a result of poor market conditions. Evonik shares have been traded on the Frankfurt Stock Exchange since 25 April 2013. Prior to the IPO the company had given institutional investors the opportunity to acquire around 14% of the shares for €2 billion.

Since 5 March 2015, the shareholding structure of the Evonik Industries AG is composed as follows:

- 67.9%: RAG Foundation
- 14.0%: Gabriel Acquisitions GmbH (a company owned by funds advised by CVC Capital Partners)
- 18.1%: Free float

=== 2012 cyclododecatriene plant fire ===
In March 2012, a fire at the Degussa plant in Marl, stopped production of cyclododecatriene (CDT) for a duration of several months. The plant produced a substantial proportion of the world's production of CDT, particularly that needed to produce laurolactam, a precursor to the polyamide PA12. This shortage in turn led to concerns for global production of finished goods, particularly in the automotive industry. Biobased polyamides, not dependent on laurolactam or CDT, have been put forward as alternative materials.

== Operations ==
Evonik divested its former holdings in the areas of energy and real estate and now focuses on the core business of specialty chemicals.

=== Chemicals Business Area ===
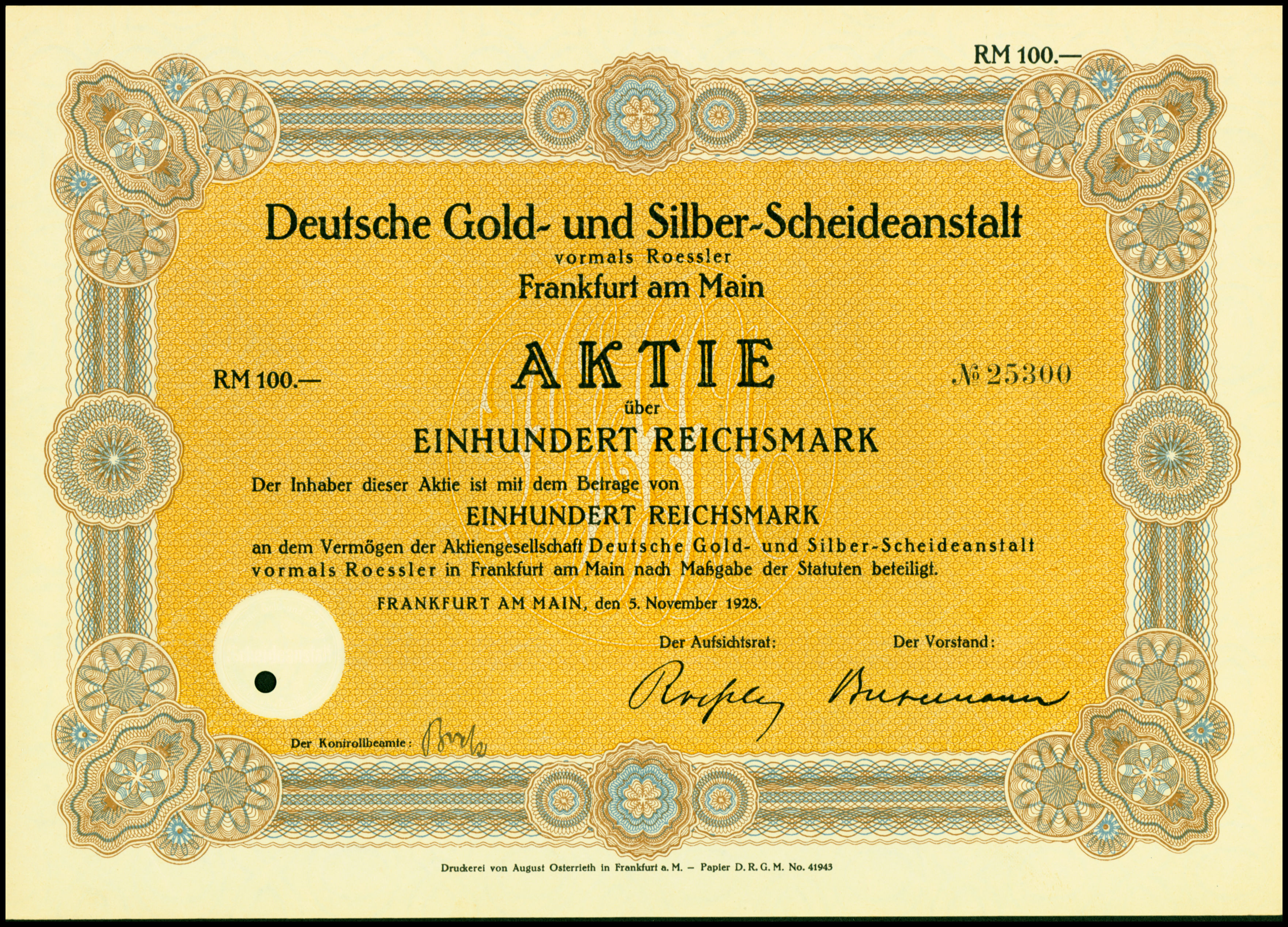
Share of the Deutsche Gold- und Silber-Scheideanstalt, issued 5 November 1928

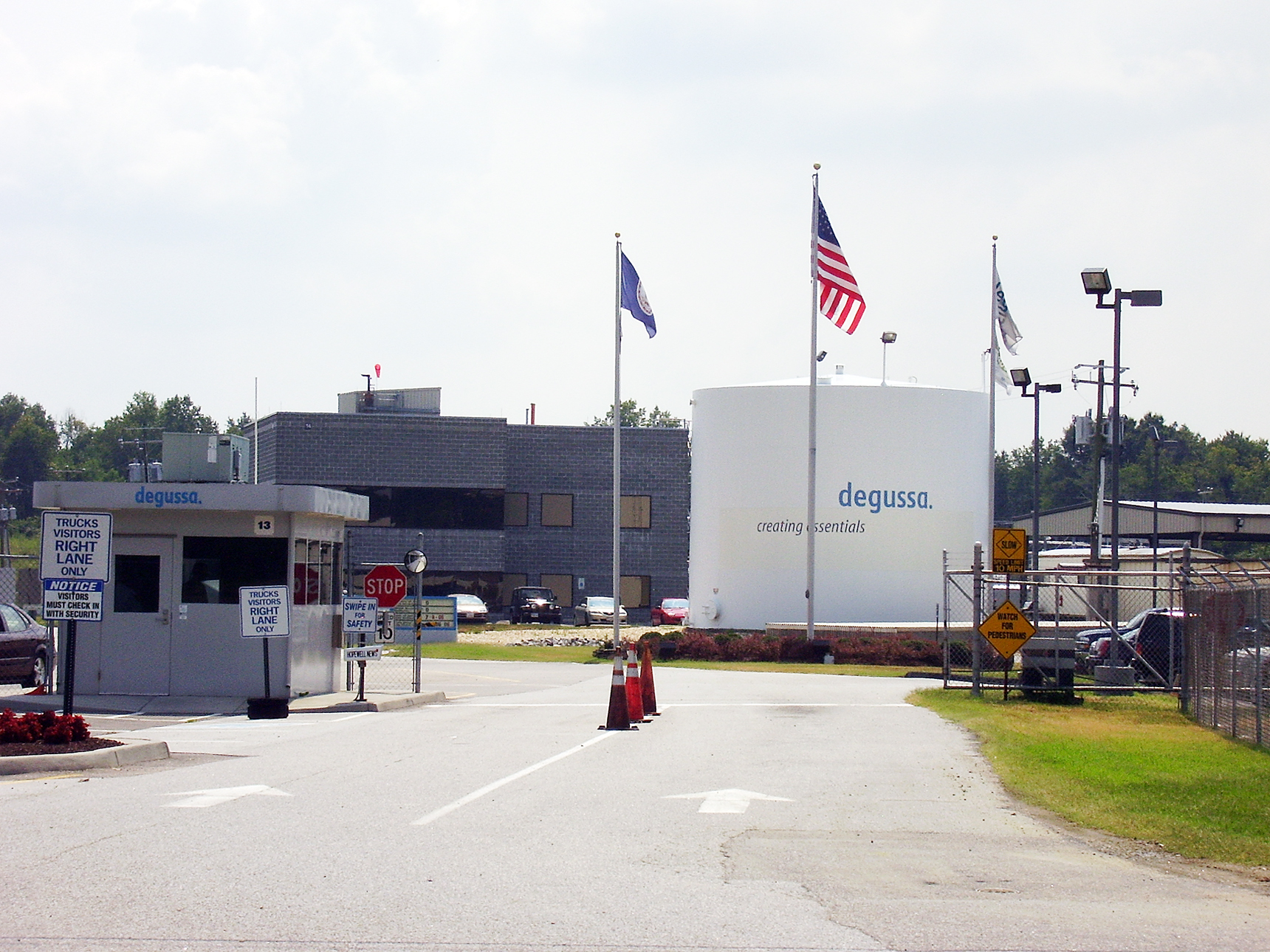
Degussa factory in Hopewell, Virginia

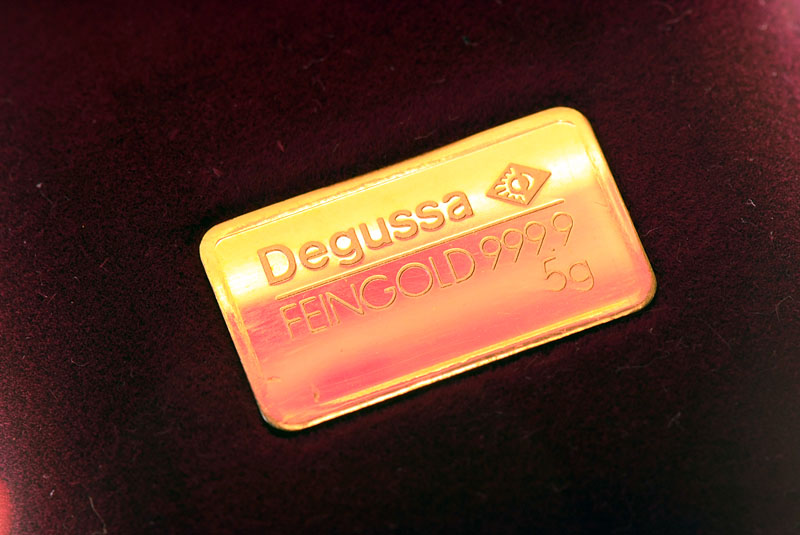
Degussa gold, 5 g

The Chemicals Business Area of Evonik emerged from Evonik Degussa GmbH (formerly Degussa GmbH — an acronym of Deutsche Gold- und Silber-Scheide-Anstalt (German Gold and Silver Separating Works)) based in Essen, Germany. It employs about 34,000 people and is one of the world's largest producers of specialty chemicals. It includes six business units: Advanced Intermediates, Consumer Specialties, Coatings & Additives, Inorganic Materials, Health & Nutrition and Performance Polymers. Degussa was acquired by RAG in 2006. Its latest acquisition is the Tippecanoe Labs plant site at Lafayette, Indiana from Eli Lilly on 1 January 2010. In November, a plant for the production of DL-methionine was opened in Singapore. At a cost of €500 million, it is the largest investment to date in the chemical sector in the company's history. In June 2014, the Supervisory Board resolved to restructure the Group, with plans for the six chemical segments to be bundled into three GmbH (limited liability) companies from 2015.

=== Energy Business Area ===
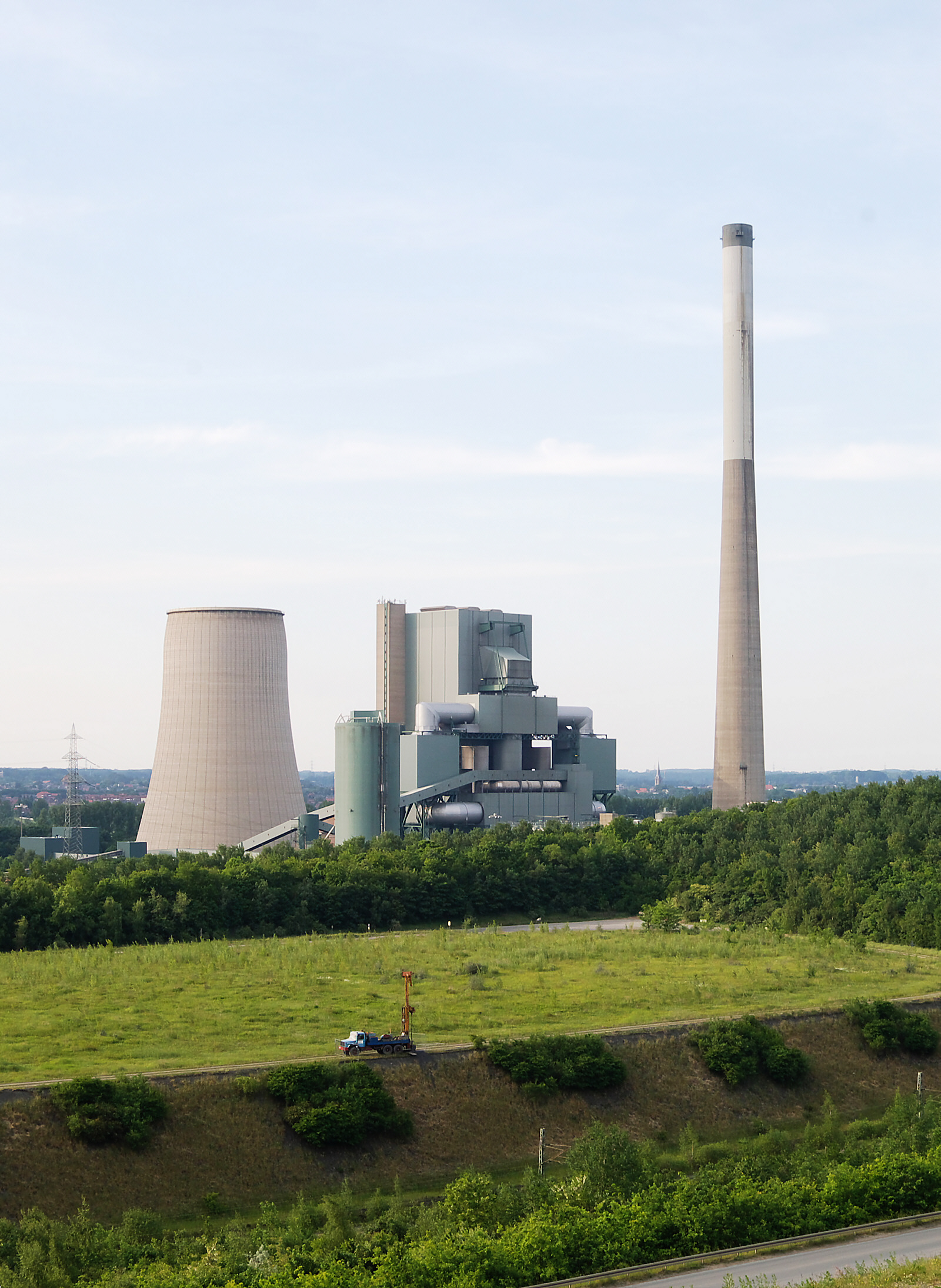
Evonik Industries operated Bergkamen Power Station.

The former energy business portion of Evonik was operated through Evonik Steag GmbH (formerly STEAG), which is the fifth largest power company in Germany, based in Essen. The company operates fourteen hard coal-fired power plants, of which eleven are located in Germany, and one in Turkey, one in Colombia and one in the Philippines, and two industrial power plants. It also operates in the field of transport, processing and distribution of hard coal, coke and byproducts from coal processing, as well as in the field of gas supply, transport and trading. In December 2010, Evonik Industries signed an agreement to sell 51% of shares in its energy business to a consortium of municipal utilities in Germany's Rhine-Ruhr region. The agreement was finalized on 2 March 2011. The remaining 49% were acquired by the consortium for €570 million in August 2014.

=== Real Estate Business Area ===
Evonik Immobilien GmbH used to manage around 60,000 company-owned residential units in Germany. In addition, it had a 50% stake in TreuHandStelle GmbH, which manages more than 70,000 residential units. Evonik Immobilien GmbH was amalgamated with TreuHandStelle GmbH and placed on a more independent basis in the medium term. As per the resolution of the general meeting held on 25 November 2011, the name of the subsidiary Evonik Immobilien GmbH was changed to Vivawest GmbH. On 1 January 2012, Vivawest merged with residential management company THS under the name Vivawest. In 2013, Evonik sold the majority of its shares in Vivawest to the RAG Foundation, the Evonik pension fund, and the coal mining corporation RAG AG. Evonik now holds only 10.9%, and there are plans to sell this stake too.

== Sponsorship ==
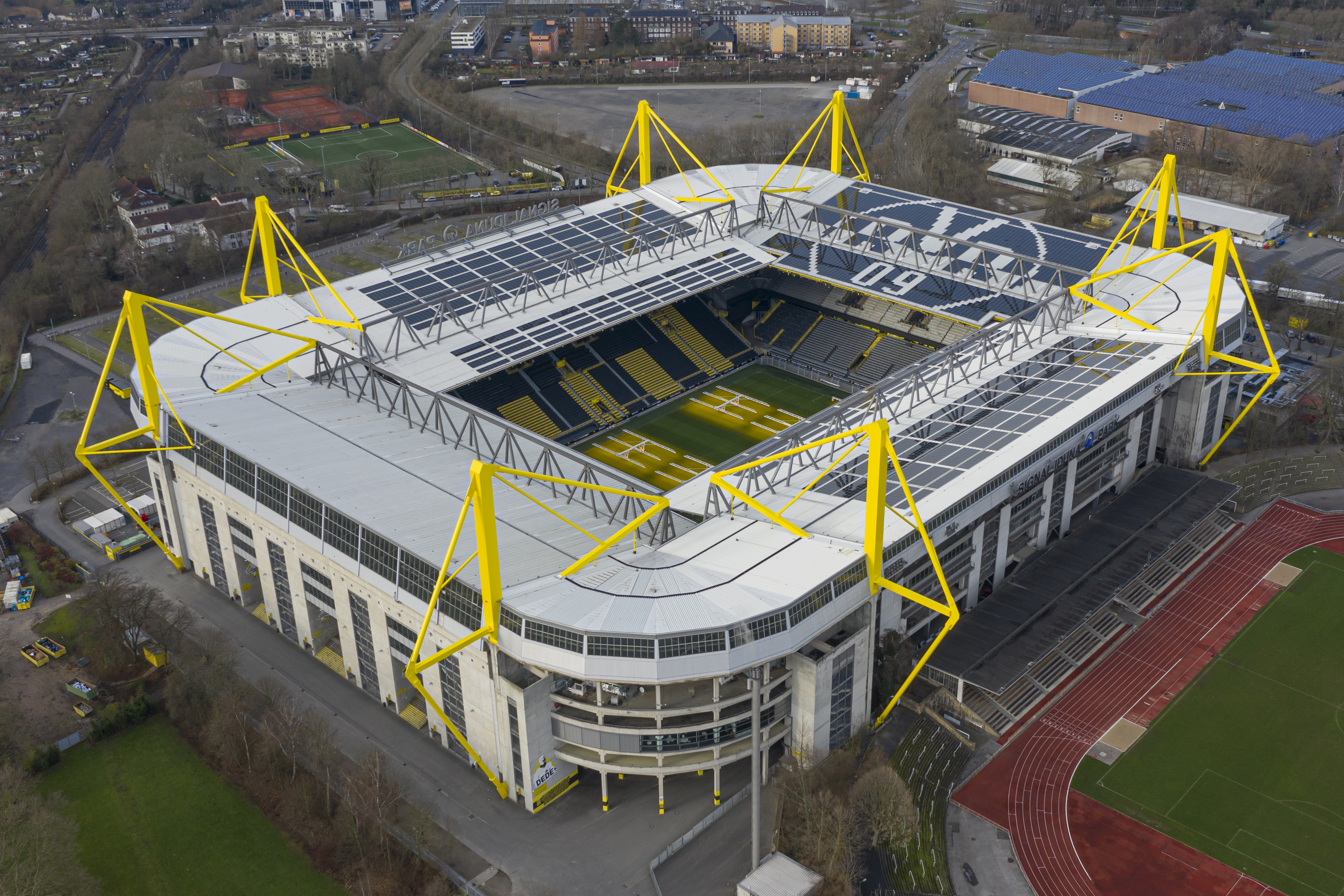
Evonik sponsors Bundesliga club Borussia Dortmund.

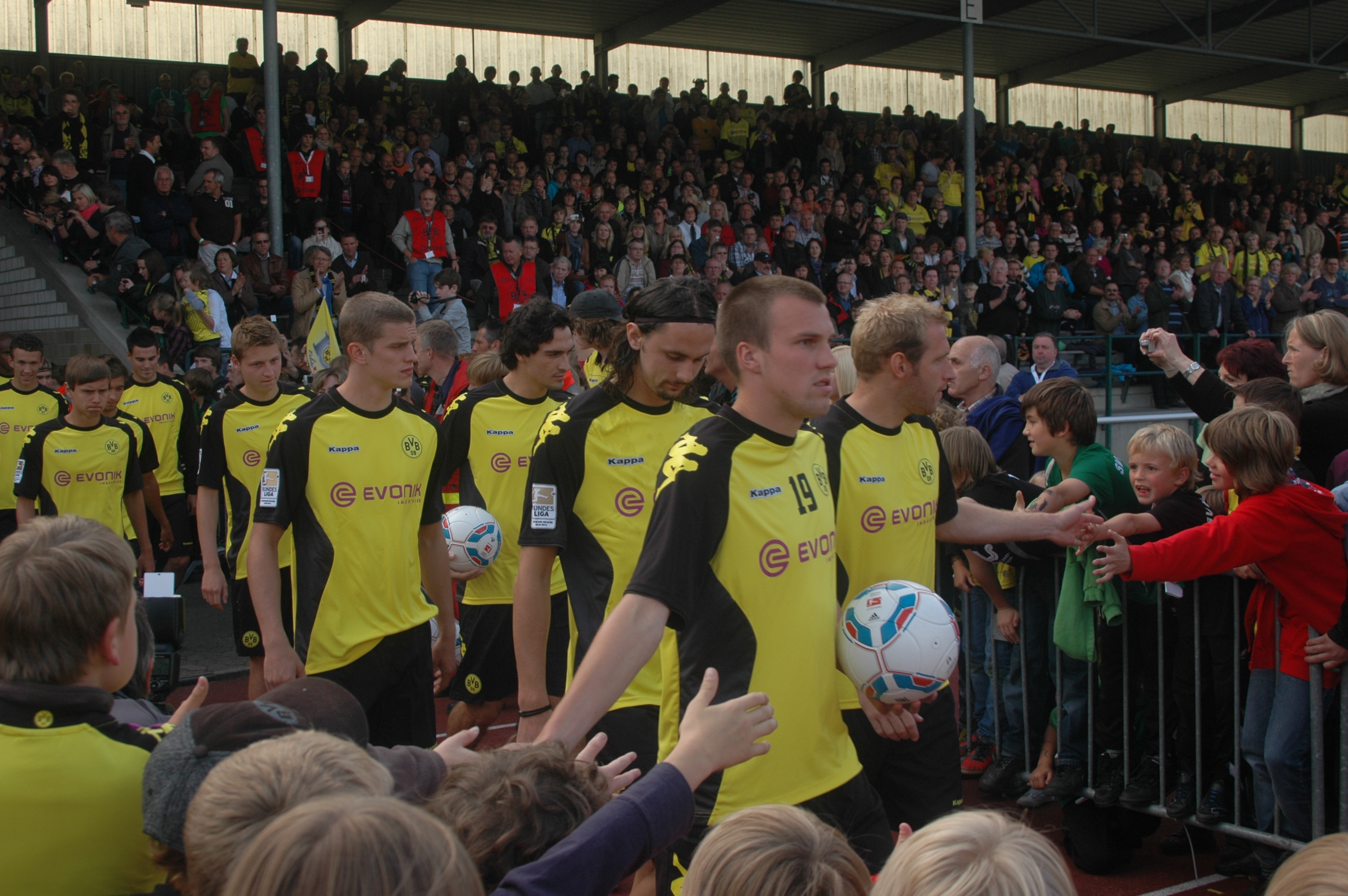
Borussia Dortmund Team wearing Evonik-sponsored kits

- Evonik has been the main shirt sponsor of Borussia Dortmund (BVB) since the 2007/2008 season. From the 2020/21 season until the 2024/25 season, Evonik was the shirt sponsor exclusively for international competitions.
- Evonik was one of the sponsors of the World Chess Championship 2008
- On 17 May 2011, as part of a charity football match between Borussia Dortmund and an all-star team from Japan, Evonik donated €1 million to a children's home situated in the Tohoku/Ichinoseki-shi earthquake zone which was destroyed by the 2011 Tohoku earthquake.
- Evonik was the main sponsor of the Rebikoff-Niggeler Foundation, a non-profit organization which conducts deep-sea research in the Azores using a submersible.

== See also ==
- RAG
