= Terry Duffy =

British trade union leader

- Born: 3 May 1922; Wolverhampton, England
- Died: 1 October 1985 (aged 63)
- Occupation: trade union leader

Terence Duffy (3 May 1922 – 1 October 1985) was a British trade union leader.

Duffy was educated at St Joseph's RC School, Wolverhampton. He served in the Second World War from 1940 to 1946 in the Royal Leicestershire Regiment assigned to the American 1st Army. He fought at Salerno and Monte Cassino.

He rose in the Amalgamated Union of Engineering Workers, becoming a Divisional Officer in 1969; a member of the Executive Council in 1976; and President in 1978. He was also on the General Council of the Trades Union Congress from 1978 until his death.

Trade union offices
Preceded by Hugh Scanlon	President of the Amalgamated Engineering Union; 1978–1985	Succeeded by Bill Jordan
Preceded by Hugh Scanlon	President of the European Metalworkers' Federation; 1979–1985	Succeeded by Bill Jordan
