= Paul Gallagher (trade unionist) =

Paul Gallagher, CBE (16 October 1944 - 26 January 2026) was a retired British trade union.

Gallagher grew up in Droylsden, Manchester, England. He began working for the Electrical, Electronic, Telecommunications and Plumbing Union (EETPU), and in 1986 was elected union president. He served in that role until the EETPU merged with the Amalgamated Engineering and Electrical Union (AEEU) in 1992.

Gallagher served as general secretary of the AEEU's new EETPU section for two years, after which time an agreement was reached that the EETPU section would elect a single general secretary for the union, while the AEU section would elect a president. Gallagher was duly voted in as sole general secretary, but took early retirement in 1995 on health grounds.

He was known for his pragmatic and moderate approach, prioritising job security through cooperation with employers. This included agreeing to no-strike pacts, and productivity-linked wage deals, a strategy that was often unpopular with the more militant unions of the time.

Throughout the early 1990s Gallagher also worked as a Health and Safety Commissioner.

== Awards and Honours ==
In 1996 Gallagher was awarded the CBE in the Queen's Birthday Honours List, for his services to Health and Safety.

Trade union offices
| Preceded by Tom Breakell | General President of the Electrical, Electronic, Telecommunications and Plumbing Union; 1986–1992 | Succeeded by Position abolished |
| Preceded by Gavin Laird | General Secretary of the Amalgamated Engineering and Electrical Union; 1992–1995 with Gavin Laird (1992–1994) | Succeeded by Ken Jackson |
