= Amalgamated Engineering and Electrical Union =

Former trade union of the United Kingdom

AEEU
- Amalgamated Engineering and Electrical Union
- Merged into: Amicus
- Founded: 1 May 1992
- Dissolved: 2001
- Headquarters: 110 Peckham Road, London
- Location: United Kingdom
- Members: 835,019 (1994)
- Affiliations: TUC, CSEU

The Amalgamated Engineering and Electrical Union (AEEU) was a British trade union. It merged with the MSF to form Amicus in 2001.

== History ==
The union was founded in 1992, when the Amalgamated Engineering Union (AEU) finally achieved a merger with the Electrical, Electronic, Telecommunications and Plumbing Union (EETPU), after a hundred years of off-and-on discussions. The new union took the name Amalgamated Engineering and Electrical Union.

The AEU had been affiliated to the Trades Union Congress, while the EETPU was not, so the merged organisation held a ballot on the question of affiliation; members voted for the new union to affiliate. The AEEU was also the largest member of the Confederation of Shipbuilding and Engineering Unions.

Membership of the new union continued to fall in line with the decline in employment in the sectors it covered. By 2001, its membership had fallen to 728,200. That year, it merged with the Manufacturing, Science and Finance union to form Amicus.

== General Secretaries ==
1992: Gavin Laird and Paul Gallagher
1994: Paul Gallagher
1995: Ken Jackson

== Presidents ==
1992: Bill Jordan and Ken Jackson
1994: Bill Jordan
1994: John Weakley (acting)
1996: Davey Hall
