= IG Bergbau, Chemie, Energie =

German trade union

IGBCE
- IG Bergbau, Chemie, Energie
- Founded: October 1997
- Headquarters: Hannover, Germany
- Location: Germany
- Members: 645,000
- Key people: Michael Vassiliadis, president
- Affiliations: DGB
- Website: www.igbce.de

The IG Bergbau, Chemie, Energie (IG BCE) is a trade union in Germany. It is one of eight industrial affiliates of the German Confederation of Trade Unions (DGB).

== History and structure ==
The IG BCE was created in 1997 from the merger of the Chemical, Paper and Ceramic Union, Leather Union, and Union of Mining and Energy. It covers workers in the following industries: mining (especially of coal), chemicals, natural gas, glass, rubber, ceramics, plastics, leather, petrol (and related products), paper, recycling, and water. With some 645,000 members (as of 2016) IG BCE represents about one tenth of all DGB members and is the third biggest union within that confederation. There are some 1,100 locals and 900 groups of shop stewards organized in 42 regional districts, which cooperate in eight state chapters: Baden-Württemberg, Bavaria, Hesse/Thuringia, North, Northeast, North Rhine, Rhineland-Palatinate/Saarland and Westphalia.

IG BCE has a subsidiary educational provider Gesellschaft für Bildung, Wissen, Seminar der IGBCE (IGBCE BWS GmbH) especially for the training of employee representatives in works councils. The trade union also owns a 26.8 % share in the private housing company Vivawest GmbH. A 100 % subsidiary company of IG BCE manages membership benefits.

In 2015, IG BCE successfully negotiated a pay rise for 550,0000 employees with Germany's chemical employers association BAVC.

== Political positions ==
IG BCE has been playing a key role in Germany's energy transition. In 2014, the union proposed that Germany's utilities should pool their struggling hard coal plants into a joint entity, referring to the hard coal plants with total capacity of between 28 and 30 gigawatts (GW), most of which are owned by E.ON, RWE, EnBW, Vattenfall and STEAG. By 2015, the union proposed gradually phasing out old coal-fired power stations and building combined heat and power (CHP) stations fired with gas. Its plan included taking at least 2.7 gigawatts of brown coal-fired capacity gradually out of the market rather than risking sudden closures. On the initiative of IG BCE, thousands of coal miners and workers in coal-fired plants marched in Berlin in April 2015 to protest a proposed levy on the oldest, most polluting power stations, saying it could lead to losses of up to 100,000 jobs and the decline of the industry in Germany.

In 2016, IG BCE, with the support of the BDI industry group, again raised concerns about plans for Germany to end its use of brown coal amid calls for it to set out a timetable for ending coal-fired power production.

In 2021, IG BCE contributed their influence on German Minister for Economic Affairs and Energy Peter Altmaier to reform the German Renewable Energy Sources Act (EEG) to the benefit of large companies which evaded the payment of EEG reallocation charges. These actions of the trade union were seen controversially by the public.

== Presidents ==
1997: Hubertus Schmoldt
2009: Michael Vassiliadis

== Notable members ==
- Barbara Hendricks – former Federal Minister for the Environment, Nature Conservation, Building and Nuclear Safety
- Ulla Schmidt – former Federal Minister of Health
- Martin Schulz – former President of the European Parliament
- Peer Steinbrück – former Minister-President of North Rhine-Westphalia
