= European Mine, Chemical and Energy Workers' Federation =

European trade union federation (1996–2012)

The European Mine, Chemical and Energy Workers' Federation (EMCEF) was a European trade union federation.

The federation was founded on 20 March 1996 in Luxembourg, with the merger of the European Federation of Chemical and General Workers' Unions and the Mineworkers' European Federation. It worked closely with the International Federation of Chemical, Energy, Mine and General Workers' Unions, which had been founded the previous year, but remained independent of it. By 2002, it had 119 affiliated unions in 33 countries, representing a total of 2.4 million members. That year, it concluded a social partnership arrangement with the European Chemical Employers' Group.

On 16 May 2012, the federation merged with the European Metalworkers' Federation and the European Trade Union Federation for Textiles, Clothing and Leather, to form IndustriALL – European Trade Union.

== Leadership ==
=== Presidents ===
1996: Hubertus Schmoldt
2011: Michael Vassiliadis

=== General Secretaries ===
1996: Franco Bisegna
1999: Reinhard Reibsch
2011: Michael Wolters
