= Gavin Laird =

Scottish trade unionist (1933–2017)

Gavin Laird CBE
- Born: 14 March 1933
- Died: 26 October 2017 (aged 84)
- Employer: Amalgamated Engineering and Electrical Union

Sir Gavin Harry Laird CBE (14 March 1933 – 26 October 2017) was a Scottish trade unionist, who became General Secretary of the Amalgamated Engineering and Electrical Union (AEEU) and a Member of the Court of the Bank of England.

Growing up in Clydebank he attended a local high school then began working for Singer. He became an Amalgamated Engineering Union (AEU) shop steward there, then convenor.

Three years after taking up a full-time position with the union, he was elected to the AEU executive and later elected AEU general secretary, remaining in that position after the merger which created the AEEU. He addressed the Confederation of British Industry annual conference in 1986 – an unusual move for a trade unionist at the time. Laird held a number of other posts and directorships. He was a member of the Arts Council between 1983 and 1986.

He received an Honorary Doctorate from Heriot-Watt University in 1994, was made a Commander of the Order of the British Empire (CBE) under Margaret Thatcher's government and knighted in 1995 at the behest of Tony Blair.

He retired from the AEEU in 1995 and died in October 2017 at the age of 84 after a long illness.

Trade union offices
Preceded by John McFarlane Boyd	General Secretary of the Amalgamated Engineering Union; 1982–1992	Succeeded by Position abolished
Preceded by New position	General Secretary of the Amalgamated Engineering and Electrical Union; 1992–1994; With: Paul Gallagher	Succeeded by Paul Gallagher
Preceded by Tom Crispin	President of the Confederation of Shipbuilding and Engineering Unions; 1986–1987	Succeeded by Todd Sullivan
