= Luc Triangle =

Belgian trade unionist

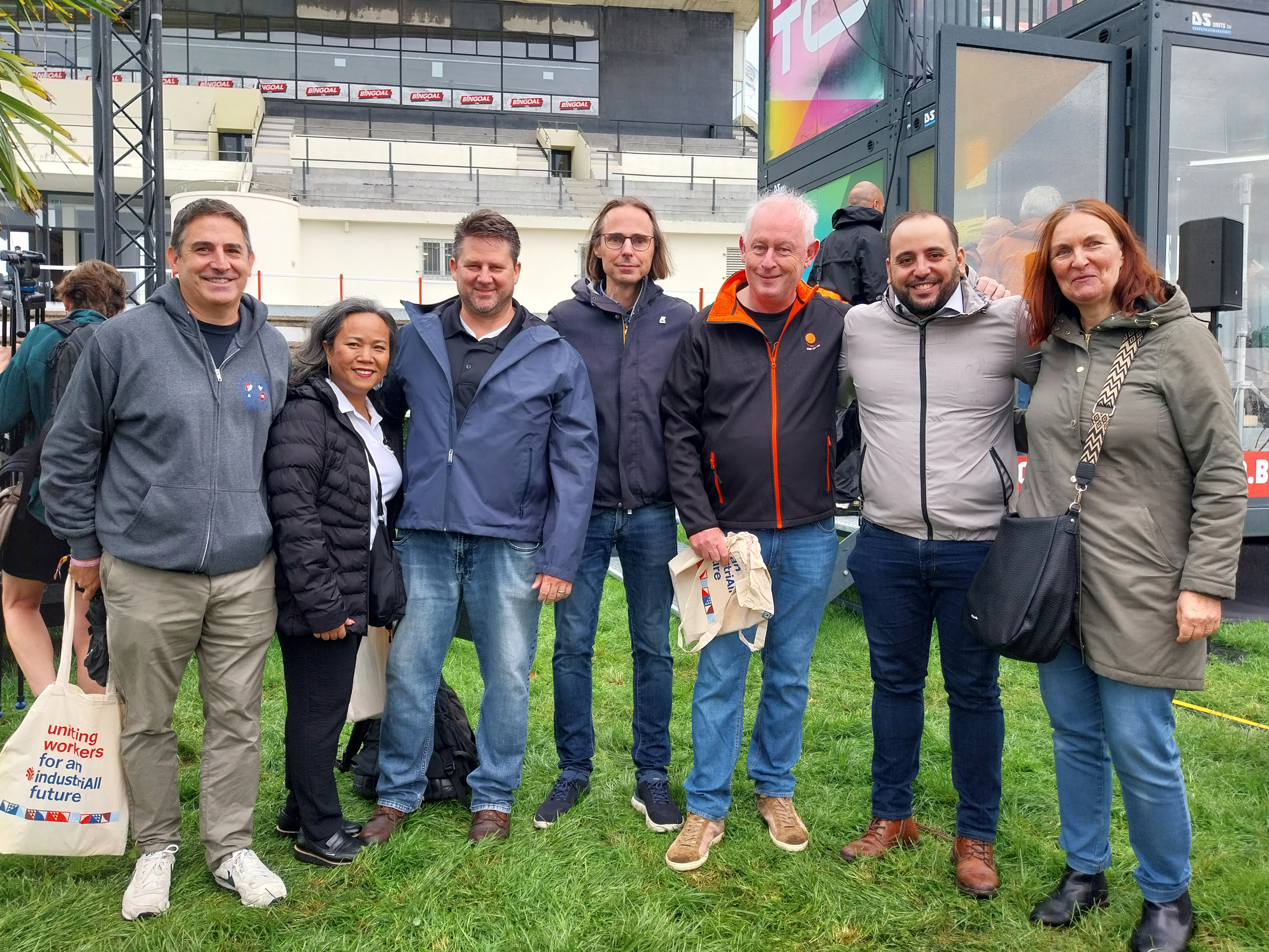
Luc Triangle (3rd from right) at ManiFiesta 2025, with American and Belgian labor leaders.

Luc Triangle (born 3 October 1961) is a Belgian trade unionist.

Born in Leuven, Triangle joined the youth section of the Confederation of Christian Trade Unions in 1982. He worked for the federation from 1984, holding posts including director of its training centre, and leader of its international work. In 2011, he moved to become general secretary of the European Trade Union Federation for Textiles, Clothing and Leather. This became part of IndustriALL – European Trade Union in 2012, with Triangle appointed as a deputy general secretary. In 2016, he won election as general secretary of the federation.

In April 2023, Triangle was appointed as acting general secretary of the International Trade Union Confederation, following the dismissal of Luca Visentini. His priorities were enacting governance and financial reforms, defending workers' rights, and campaigning for a new social contract. At the ITUC's 6th Extraordinary World Congress, he was elected unopposed as General Secretary on 12 October 2023.

Trade union offices
| Preceded by Patrick Itschert | General Secretary of the European Trade Union Federation for Textiles, Clothing and Leather; 2011–2012 | Succeeded by Federation merged |
| Preceded by Ulrich Eckelmann | General Secretary of IndustriALL – European Trade Union; 2016–2023 | Succeeded by Judith Kirton-Darling |
| Preceded by Luca Visentini | General Secretary of the International Trade Union Confederation; 2023–present | Succeeded by Incumbent |
