= Daniela De Ridder =

German politician

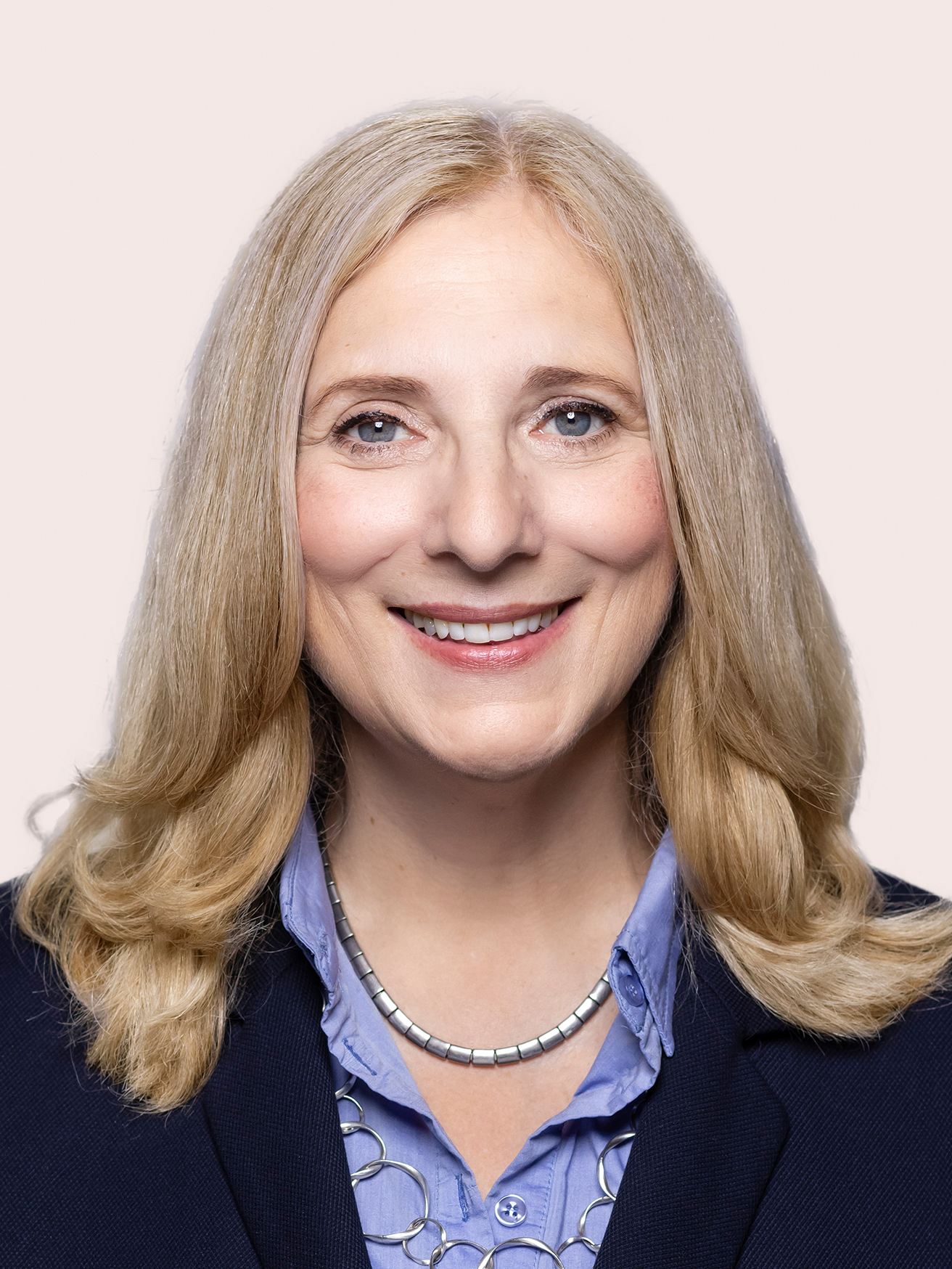
- De Ridder in 2021

Member of the Bundestag; from Lower Saxony
- In office 3 June 2022 – 25 March 2025
- Preceded by: Yasmin Fahimi
- Succeeded by: Boris Pistorius
- Constituency: Stadt Hannover II
- In office 22 October 2013 – 26 October 2021
- Constituency: State list

Personal details
- Born: 27 November 1962 (age 63) Kiel, West Germany
- Party: Social Democratic
- Children: 2
- Education: RWTH Aachen University; Institut Saint-Luc; University of Göttingen; University of Osnabrück

Daniela De Ridder (born 27 November 1962) is a German-Belgian politician of the Social Democratic Party (SPD) who has served as a member of the Bundestag from the state of Lower Saxony from 2013 until 2021 and again since May 2022.

== Political career ==
De Ridder first became a member of the Bundestag after the 2013 German federal election, representing the Mittelems district. She was a member of the Committee for Education, Research and Technology Assessment before moving to the Committee on Foreign Affairs and its Sub-Committee on Civilian Crisis Prevention in 2018. She was the committee's deputy chairwoman until September 2021.

In addition to her committee assignments, De Ridder has served as deputy chairwoman of the German Parliamentary Friendship Group with Belgium and Luxembourg (2014–2018) and the German-French Parliamentary Friendship Group (2018–2021). Since 2018, she has also been part of the German delegation to the Parliamentary Assembly of the Organization for Security and Co-operation in Europe (OSCE). In 2020, she joined the Inter-Parliamentary Alliance on China.

In the 2021 election, De Ridder initially missed re-entry into parliament; by June 2022, she took the seat of Yasmin Fahimi who had resigned from parliament.

== Other activities ==
- German Foundation for Peace Research (DSF), Member of the Board (2014–2018)
