= Katarina Barley =

German politician (born 1968)

Katarina Barley MEP
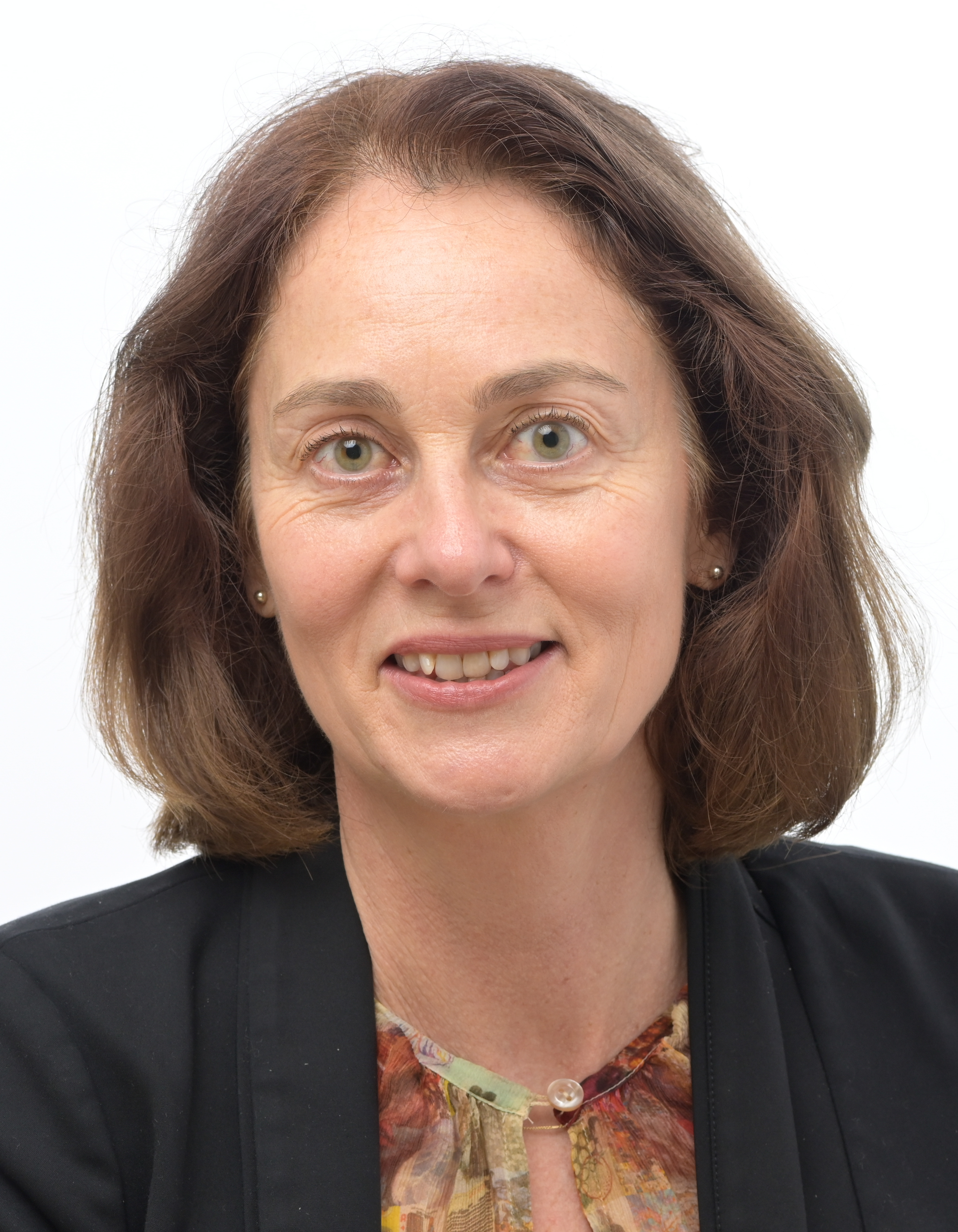
- Official portrait, 2024

Vice President of the European Parliament
- Incumbent
- Assumed office 3 July 2019 Serving with See List
- President: David Sassoli; Roberta Metsola

Minister of Justice and Consumer Protection
- In office 14 March 2018 – 27 June 2019
- Chancellor: Angela Merkel
- Preceded by: Heiko Maas
- Succeeded by: Christine Lambrecht

Minister of Labour and Social Affairs
- Acting
- In office 28 September 2017 – 14 March 2018
- Chancellor: Angela Merkel
- Preceded by: Andrea Nahles
- Succeeded by: Hubertus Heil

Minister of Family Affairs, Senior Citizens, Women and Youth
- In office 2 June 2017 – 14 March 2018
- Chancellor: Angela Merkel
- Preceded by: Manuela Schwesig
- Succeeded by: Franziska Giffey

General Secretary of the Social Democratic Party
- In office 11 December 2015 – 2 June 2017
- Leader: Sigmar Gabriel; Martin Schulz
- Preceded by: Yasmin Fahimi
- Succeeded by: Hubertus Heil
Parliamentary constituencies
Member of the European Parliament for Germany
Incumbent
Assumed office 2 July 2019
Preceded by	Multi-member district
Constituency	Social Democratic Party List
Member of the Bundestag for Rhineland-Palatinate
In office 22 October 2013 – 1 July 2019
Preceded by	Multi-member district
Succeeded by	Isabel Mackensen
Constituency	Social Democratic Party List

Personal details
- Born: 19 November 1968 (age 57) Cologne, West Germany (now Germany)
- Citizenship: Germany; United Kingdom
- Party: SPD (since 1994)
- Spouse: Marco van den Berg (m. 2020)
- Children: 2
- Education: University of Marburg; Paris-Sud University; University of Münster
- Website: Official website

Katarina Barley (born 19 November 1968) is a German politician and lawyer who has been a Member of the European Parliament since 2019, serving as one of its Vice-Presidents. She served as Federal Minister of Justice and Consumer Protection in the fourth Cabinet of Angela Merkel. Prior to that, she had served as Federal Minister of Family Affairs, Senior Citizens, Women and Youth and since 28 September 2017 also as the acting Federal Minister of Labour and Social Affairs, both until 14 March 2018.

A member of the Social Democratic Party of Germany, Barley served as a member of the Bundestag from 2013 until 2019 and was Secretary-General of her party from 2015 to 2017. She holds law degrees from France and Germany and a doctorate in European law, and formerly worked as a corporate lawyer with the law firm Wessing & Berenberg-Gossler in Hamburg, as a judge and as a governmental legal adviser. Barley holds citizenship of both Germany and Britain.

== Background ==
Barley was born and grew up in Cologne; her father was an English-born journalist who worked with the English-language service of Germany's international broadcaster, the Deutsche Welle, and her mother was a German physician. From birth, she only held British citizenship and acquired German citizenship some years later. She is fluent in German, English, and French.

Barley's father (born 1935) was originally from Lincolnshire. She said her father grew up in a working-class family on a very small and simple farm that lacked electricity, and that he was awarded a scholarship to attend university after being discovered as a talented pupil by his teacher; however after being turned down by the University of Cambridge, he decided as a matter of principle to turn his back on British universities and move to West Germany to attend university instead; he first moved to Hanover and later to West Berlin, where he found society to be more egalitarian and progressive. In Germany he met Barley's mother and was employed as a journalist with Deutsche Welle's English service in Cologne after graduating. Her mother (born 1940) belonged to an upper-middle-class family from eastern Germany and was the daughter of an engineer in the automotive industry; her family fled the Red Army in 1945 and came as refugees from Stalinism to western Germany. Barley has said that she had a happy childhood, but that she grew up with a strong sense of social justice, influenced by her parents' experiences. Although neither of her parents were born in that part of Europe, she identifies culturally as a Rhinelander.

== Education and early career ==
Barley studied at the University of Marburg and the University of Paris-Sud. She graduated with a French law degree (Diplôme de droit français) in 1990 and a German law degree in 1993. In 1998, she earned a doctoral degree in European law at the University of Münster. Supervised by Bodo Pieroth, her thesis was on the constitutional right of citizens of the European Union to vote in municipal elections.

Barley was called to the bar in 1998 and worked as a lawyer with the major Hamburg corporate law firm Wessing & Berenberg-Gossler (now Taylor Wessing, following the merger with a British law firm) until 1999. She then worked as a legal adviser for the state government of Rhineland-Palatinate until 2001, when she became an assistant to constitutional judge Renate Jaeger in Karlsruhe. She worked in Luxembourg as a German representative to the Maison de la Grande Région/Haus der Großregion, a cooperation forum for Luxembourg and neighbouring German, French and Belgian regions, from 2005 to 2006.

From 2007 to 2008, Barley was a judge of the Trier district court and at the Wittlich local court. From 2008 to 2013 she was an adviser on bioethics to the Rhineland-Palatinate State Ministry of Justice and Consumer Protection. She left this position when she was elected to Parliament in 2013.

== Political career ==
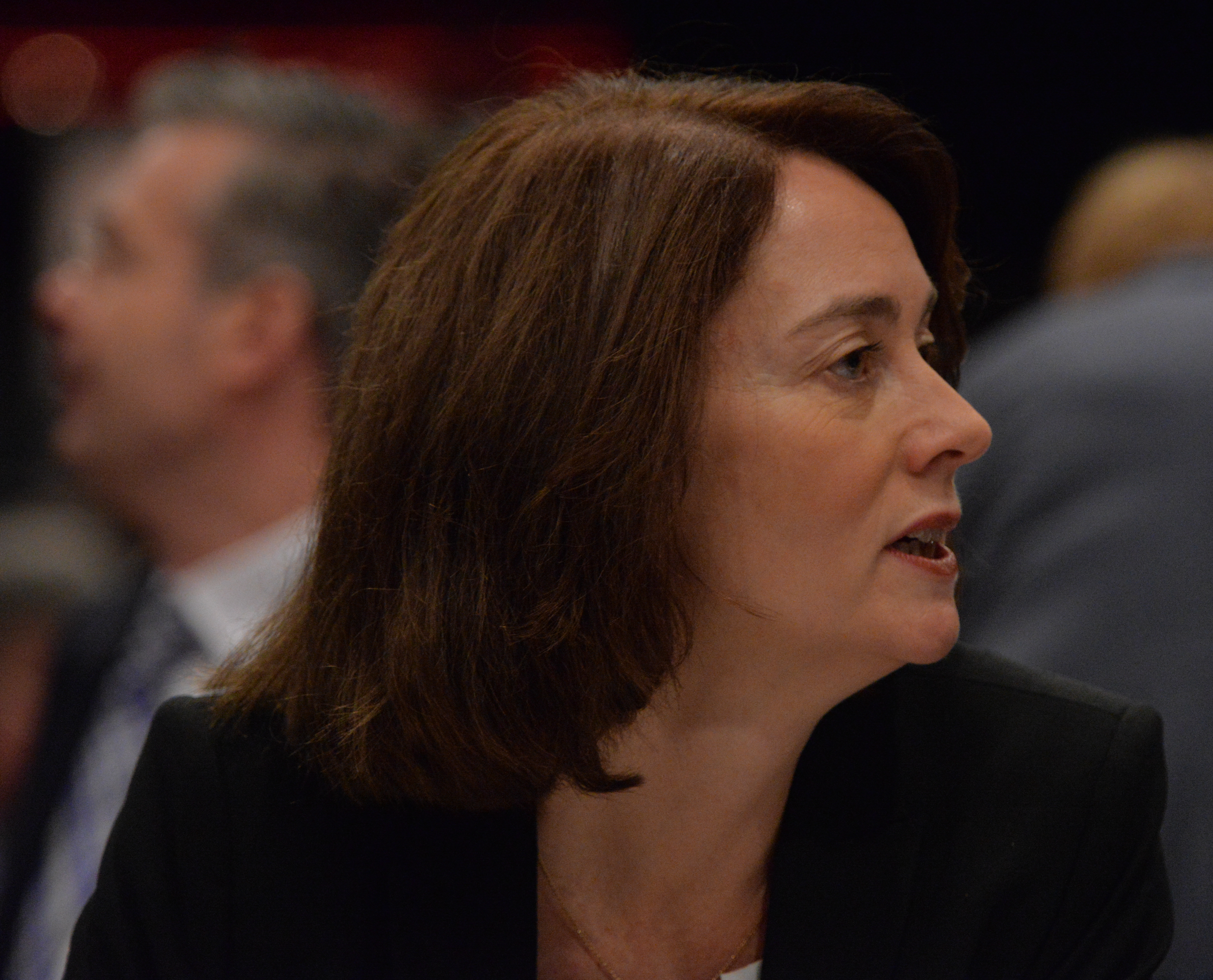
Barley in 2015

Barley joined the Social Democratic Party of Germany in 1994. In her parliamentary work, Barley represented the constituency of Trier for the Social Democratic Party of Germany. Barley served as a member of the parliament's Council of Elders, which – among other duties – determines daily legislative agenda items and assigning committee chairpersons based on party representation. She was also a member of the parliamentary body in charge of appointing judges to the Highest Courts of Justice, namely the Federal Court of Justice (BGH), the Federal Administrative Court (BVerwG), the Federal Fiscal Court (BFH), the Federal Labour Court (BAG), and the Federal Social Court (BSG). In 2014, she was appointed to serve on the Committee on the Election of Judges (Wahlausschuss), which is in charge of appointing judges to the Federal Constitutional Court of Germany. On the Committee on Legal Affairs and Consumer Protection, she served as her parliamentary group's rapporteur on voluntary euthanasia.

In 2014, Barley briefly served as a member of the Committee on the Affairs of the European Union. In addition to her committee assignments, she is a member of the German-British Parliamentary Friendship Group. Within the SPD parliamentary group, Barley belonged to the Parliamentary Left, a left-wing movement.

=== Secretary-General of the SPD, 2015–2017 ===
In 2015, Barley was proposed by party chairman Sigmar Gabriel to succeed Yasmin Fahimi in the role of general secretary of the SPD, one of the party's most senior positions. Since March 2017, she served under the leadership of Martin Schulz and managed the launch of the party's campaign for the national elections.

=== Federal Minister, 2017–2019 ===
In May 2017, Schulz announced that Barley would succeed Manuela Schwesig as Federal Minister of Family Affairs, Senior Citizens, Women and Youth for the remainder of the legislative term until the elections. She was appointed on 2 June. She additionally became acting Federal Minister of Labour and Social Affairs on 28 September 2017, when Andrea Nahles stepped down to become the parliamentary leader of the SPD. On 9 March 2018, Barley was named by Andrea Nahles and Olaf Scholz to succeed Heiko Maas as Minister of Justice and Consumer Protection in the fourth coalition government under the leadership of Chancellor Angela Merkel, sworn in on 14 March 2018.

=== Member of the European Parliament, 2019–present ===
In October 2018, the SPD announced that Barley would be the party's lead candidate for the 2019 European elections. Since becoming a Member of the European Parliament, Barley has been serving as one of its Vice-Presidents; in this capacity, she has been part of the Parliament's leadership under Presidents David Sassoli (2019–2022) and Roberta Metsola (since 2022). She also joined the Committee on Civil Liberties, Justice and Home Affairs, where she is a member of the Democracy, Rule of Law & Fundamental Rights Monitoring Group. Since 2021, she has been part of the Parliament's delegation to the Conference on the Future of Europe. In addition to her committee assignments, Barley is a member of the European Parliament Intergroup on LGBT Rights.

== Political positions ==
=== European integration ===
Barley is a member of the Europa-Union Deutschland. In October 2018, she demanded to end the border controls at the German-Austrian border that Germany introduced as a reaction to the European migrant crisis "soon" to ensure a "working European Single Market". She called for a "European solution" and protection of the European external borders instead.

=== China ===
In a joint letter initiated by Norbert Röttgen and Anthony Gonzalez ahead of the 47th G7 summit in 2021, Barley joined some 70 legislators from Europe and the US in calling upon their leaders to take a tough stance on China and to "avoid becoming dependent" on the country for technology including artificial intelligence and 5G.

=== Hungary ===
Barley has repeatedly criticized the Hungarian prime minister Viktor Orbán, and called Orbán a "cowardly dictator". She has criticised democratic backsliding and the undermining of the rule of law in Hungary and Poland. During an interview for the Deutschlandfunk Radio, Barley called for withholding EU subsidies and specifically for "starving" Orbán financially, stating that "he needs the money. And if we say, you won't get any money, then in the end, I think, he will have to give in at one point or another." The Polish prime minister’s chief of staff Michał Dworczyk said that Barley’s comments were "shameful" and evoked "the worst possible historical associations". He went on to quip that "Germans indeed have experience in starving and persecution". Mateusz Morawiecki, the then prime minister of Poland, said on the words of Barley that it was a "diplomatic scandal" and that "Germans should remember starvations and genocides [caused by them]."

=== Russia ===
Barley gave a few exclusive interviews to Russia Today German, Vladimir Putin's propaganda channel, legitimizing RT as a journalistic media outlet, and many other politicians across the political spectrum also did the same, raising concerns about Russian disinformation and its influence on democracy in Germany. In one of the Russia Today interviews from April 2019, she said: "We maintain a close relationship with Russia. ... Russia has always been our partner and will remain so. ... But of course we are very critical on some points [citing the annexation of Crimea as an example]."

== Other activities ==
- Workers' Samaritan Foundation Germany (ASB), President (since 2022)
- Business Forum of the Social Democratic Party of Germany, Member of the Political Advisory Board (since 2020)
- Academy of European Law (ERA), Member of the Governing Board (since 2019)
- German Council on Foreign Relations (DGAP), Member of the Presidium (since 2019)
- Friends of the Global Fund (Europe), Member of the Board of Directors
- Jacques Delors Centre at Hertie School, Member of the Advisory Board
- Magnus Hirschfeld Foundation, Ex-Officio Chairwoman of the Board of Trustees (2018–2019)
- ZDF, Member of the Television Board (since 2016), Member of the Program Committee
- European Youth Parliament – Germany, Member of the Board of Trustees
- Institute for European Politics (IEP), Member of the Board of Trustees
- Wilhelm Dröscher Prize, Member of the Board of Trustees
- Stiftung Lesen, Member of the Board of Trustees
- Trier University of Applied Sciences, Member of the Board of Trustees
- German United Services Trade Union (ver.di), Member
- German Forum for Crime Prevention (DFK), Ex-Officio Member of the Board of Trustees (2018–2019)
- German Association for Small and Medium-Sized Businesses (BVMW), Member of the Political Advisory Board (2016–2017)

== Personal life ==
Barley's former husband Antonio, a lawyer, is a dual Spanish and Dutch citizen with a Spanish father and a Dutch mother; they met when they both studied in Paris and have two sons. Since 2018, Barley has been in a relationship with Marco van den Berg, they married in 2020.

Political offices
Preceded by Heiko Maas	Minister of Justice and Consumer Protection; 2018–2019	Succeeded by Christine Lambrecht
