= Albert Stegemann =

German politician

Albert Stegemann MdB
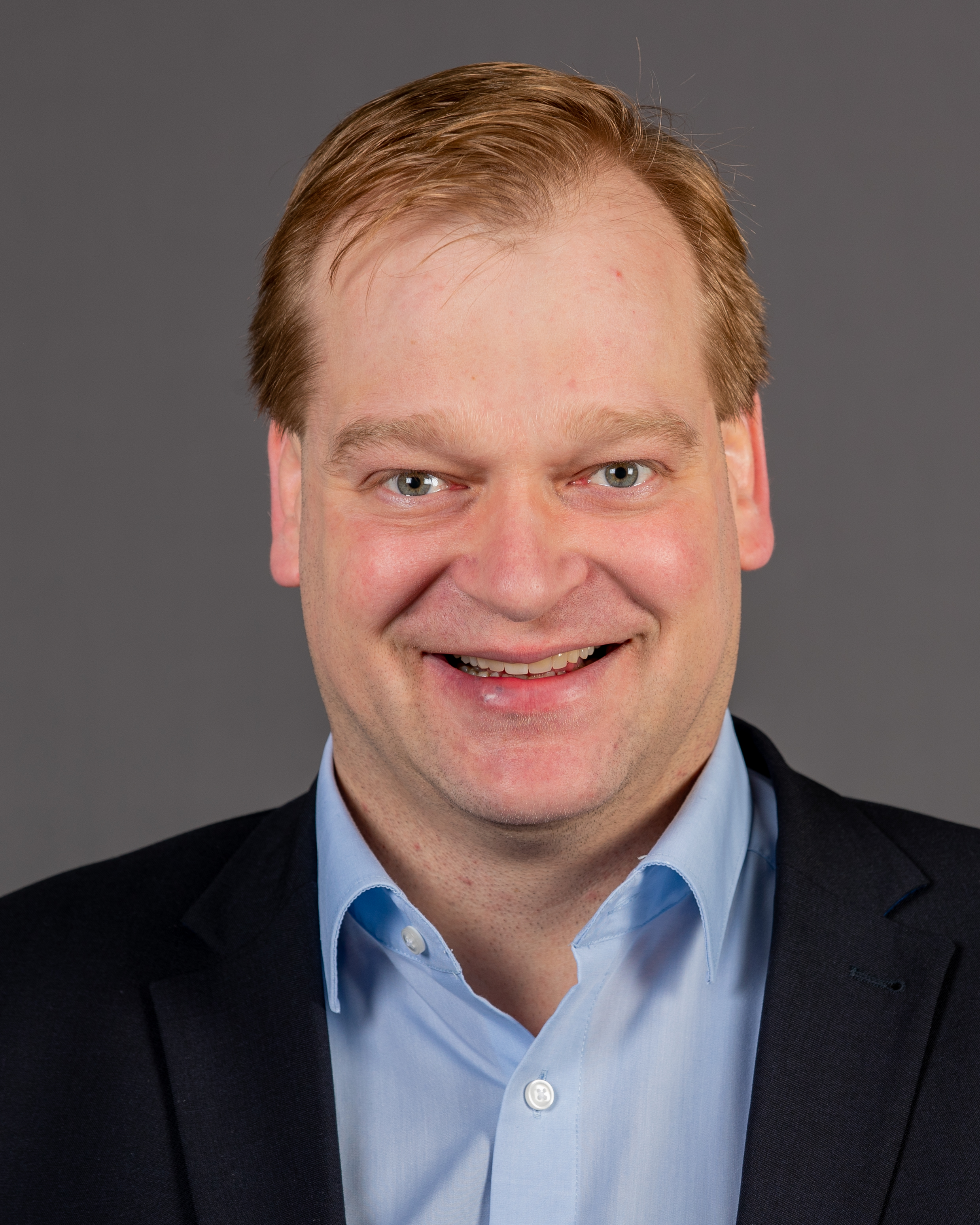
- Stegemann in 2020

Member of the Bundestag; for Mittelems
- Incumbent
- Assumed office 22 October 2013
- Preceded by: Hermann Kues

Personal details
- Born: Albert Stegeman; 9 March 1976 (age 50) Nordhorn, West Germany
- Party: Christian Democratic Union

Albert Stegemann (born 9 March 1976) is a German politician of the Christian Democratic Union (CDU) who has been serving as a member of the Bundestag from the state of Lower Saxony since 2013.

== Political career ==
Stegemann first became a member of the German Parliament after the 2013 German federal election. In parliament, he is a member of the Committee for Food and Agriculture.

Since 2025, Stegemann has been serving as deputy chair of the CDU/CSU parliamentary group, under the leadership of chairman Jens Spahn. In this capacity, he oversees the group's legislative activity on food, agriculture and health.
