= IndustriALL – European Trade Union =

IndustriALL European Trade Union is a European trade union federation, founded on 16 May 2012. The Union represents 7.1 million working people of nearly 200 European trade unions. It was formed by the consolidation of three former European union federations:

- EMF, European Metalworkers' Federation
- EMCEF, European Mine, Chemical and Energy Workers' Federation
- ETUF-TCL, European Trade Union Federation for Textiles, Clothing and Leather

Most IndustriALL European Trade Union affiliates are also members of the IndustriALL Global Union. Both organisations cooperate on issues of common interest.

== Leadership ==
=== General Secretaries ===
2012: Ulrich Eckelmann
2016: Luc Triangle
2024: Judith Kirton-Darling

=== Presidents ===
2012: Michael Vassiliadis
