= Bill Jordan, Baron Jordan =

British economist and Labour politician (born 1936)

The Right Honourable The Lord Jordan CBE FRSA
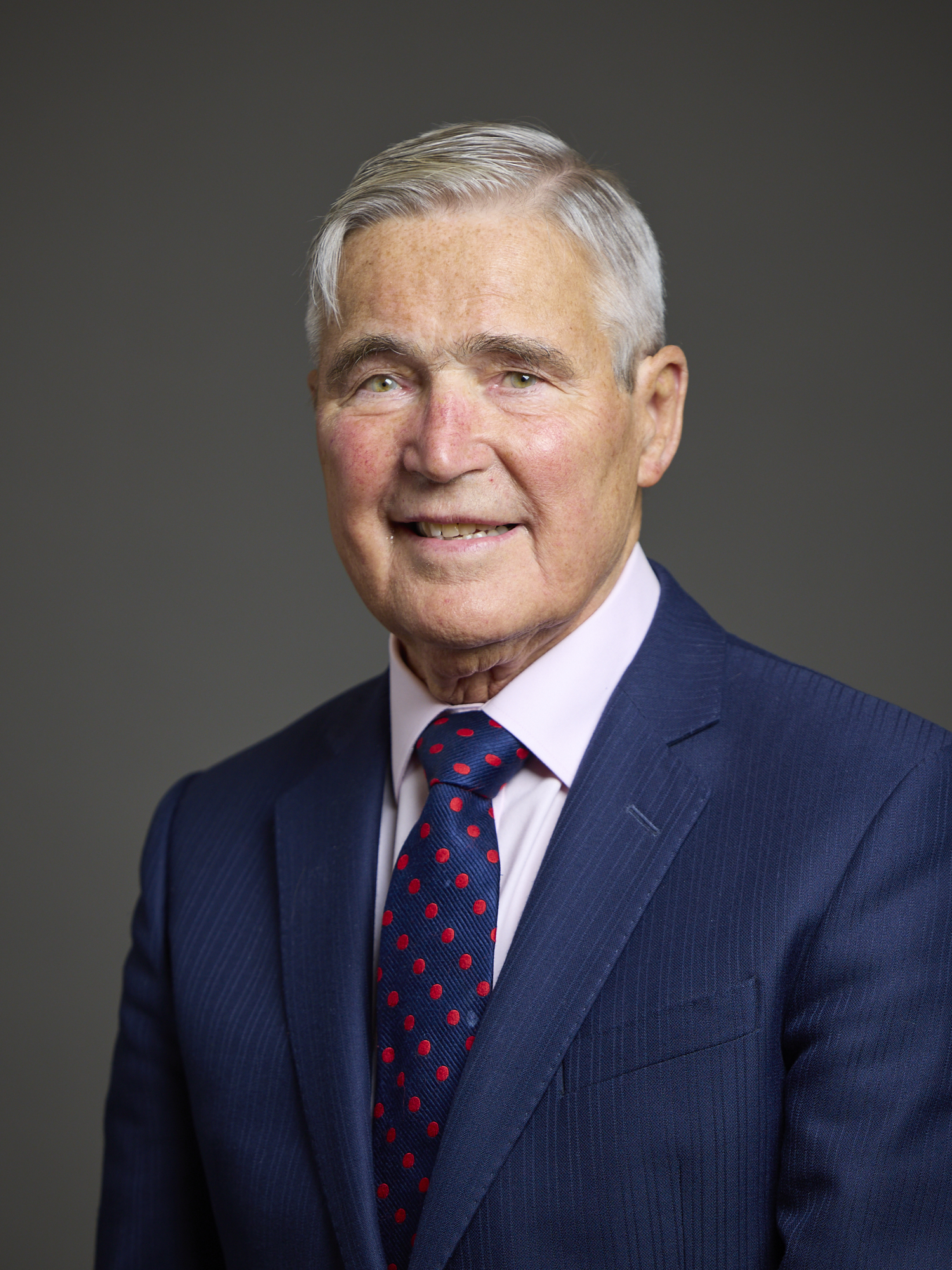
- Official portrait, 2026

Member of the House of Lords
- Lord Temporal
- Life peerage 5 June 2000

Personal details
- Born: 28 January 1936 (age 90)

William Brian Jordan, Baron Jordan, CBE FRSA (born 28 January 1936), known as Bill Jordan, is a British economist and Labour politician.

The son of Walter and Alice Jordan, he was educated at the Barford Road Secondary Modern School in Birmingham.

Jordan was President of the Amalgamated Engineering Union (AEU), and then its successor, the Amalgamated Engineering and Electrical Union (AEEU), from 1986 to 1994. During the same time, he was a member of the Trades Union Congress (TUC) General Council. In 1995, he became General Secretary of the International Confederation of Free Trade Unions (ICFTU), a post he held until 2002.

He was also a long-serving governor of the London School of Economics from 1987 to 2002, and of the BBC from 1988 to 1998.

Jordan was appointed a Commander of the Order of the British Empire (CBE) in the 1992 New Year Honours, and was created a life peer with the title Baron Jordan, of Bournville in the County of West Midlands, on 5 June 2000.

Since 1958, Lord Jordan has been married to Jean Ann Livesey; they have three daughters, nine grandchildren and three great-grandchildren.

Trade union offices
| Preceded by Terry Duffy | President of the Amalgamated Engineering Union; 1986–1992 | Union merged |
| Preceded by Terry Duffy | President of the European Metalworkers' Federation; 1986–1995 | Succeeded by Tony Janssen |
| New post | President of the Amalgamated Engineering and Electrical Union; 1992–1994; With: Ken Jackson (1992–1994) | Succeeded by John Weakley |
| Preceded by Enzo Friso | General Secretary of the International Confederation of Free Trade Unions; 1995–2002 | Succeeded by Guy Ryder |
Orders of precedence in the United Kingdom
| Preceded by The Lord Coe | Gentlemen; Baron Jordan | Followed by The Lord Hodgson of Astley Abbotts |
