= RAG AG =

German coal company

- Company type: Public (Aktiengesellschaft)
- Industry: Mining
- Predecessor: Michelwerke; Steag
- Founded: 1968; 58 years ago
- Headquarters: Essen, Germany
- Key people: Peter Schrimpf, CEO
- Products: Coal mining
- Number of employees: 37,000 (2005)
- Website: www.rag.de

RAG AG, formerly Ruhrkohle AG, is the largest German coal mining corporation. The company headquarters are in Essen, North Rhine-Westphalia, in the Ruhr area. The company was founded on 27 November 1968, consolidating several coal mining corporations into the Ruhrkohle AG.

On 12 September 2007 as a result of restructuring, the business areas of chemicals, energy and real estate were transferred to the new business entity Evonik Industries AG. Today, Evonik Industries are majority owned by the RAG-Stiftung (English: RAG-Foundation), which uses corporate profits to finance the costs that arise due to the former mining activities in the Ruhr region. The foundation plans on using about 220 million euro per year from 2019 to maintain abandoned coal mines, which mainly involves pumping out the ground water that destabilises tunnels. Since its board of trustees is dominated by federal and regional government officials as well as unions, RAG Foundation is also keen to secure Evonik's more than 20,000 jobs in Germany. But in 2024 Evonik wants to cut 10% jobs of its employees in Germany

By June 2014, the foundation received the approval from its board of trustees to cut its Evonik stake to 60 percent over the medium term.
