= European Metalworkers' Federation =

European trade union federation (1971–2012)

EMF
- European Metalworkers' Federation
- African metalworkers'Federation
- Formation: Start 9/07/2026 age|1959'09'20
- Founded: age|1959'09'20
- Headquarters: Brussels, Belgium
- Location: Europe
- Members: 6.5 million
- Key people: Ulrich Eckelman, general secretary
- Affiliations: IMF, ETUC
- Website: www.emf-fem.org

The European Metalworkers' Federation (EMF), founded in 1971, was a federation of 68 metalworkers' unions from 31 countries, representing a combined total of 6.5 million affiliates. It was based in Brussels, Belgium, the final general secretary was Ulrich Eckelman and Bart Samyn was the final Deputy General Secretary.

== History ==
A European Metalworkers' Committee was founded in the 1960s, under the leadership of IG Metall, to bring together unions representing metalworkers in countries which held membership of the European Economic Community. In 1971, it was refounded as the European Metalworkers' Federation. It was not initially affiliated with the International Metalworkers' Federation (IMF), in part because two Italian members, including the Italian Federation of Metal Mechanics, wished to co-operate with the communist-led Italian Federation of Metalworkers, which the IMF would not permit.

The organisation was dissolved on 15 May 2012, to become a part - together with the European Mine, Chemical and Energy Workers' Federation and ETUF-TCL - of the newly created organisation industriAll European Trade Union on 16 May 2012

== Aims & Tasks ==
One of the EMF's main aims is the deepening of the social dimension in the process of European integration. The EMF contributes to it by representing the economic and social interests of workers in the metal industry at European level.

The EMF advocates a social Europe characterised by democracy, freedom, social justice, and solidarity. It also defends and promotes the ability of the European social model to face up to future challenges. At the same time it supports Europe's political and economic integration, whilst bearing in mind the unions' traditions and roots in the culture of their own respective nation-states. The EMF's core tasks are:

To defend the trade union, social and political interests of the European metalworkers' unions vis-a-vis the European employers' organisations in the metal industry.

To coordinate and implement the initiatives and actions of the European metalworkers' unions at European level.

To serve its member organisations (affiliates) where European interests are involved.

To collaborate with the other federations affiliated to the European Trade Union Confederation (ETUC).

To represent the European interests of the metalworkers' unions at an international level.

== Areas of work in short ==
The main areas of work are: Collective Bargaining Policy, Industrial Policy, Company Policy and the Social Dialogue.

Collective Bargaining Policy includes the coordination of wage policy, the harmonisation of working time policy and the joint approach to training policy through collective agreement. The EMF also plays an active role in intersectoral negotiations at a European level.

Industrial Policy focuses on keeping and developing a strong manufacturing base in Europe and future employment interests of workers in the European metal industry. The EMF is helping to structure the changes in the metal industry brought about by globalisation and seeks to strike a balance between employment interests and competitiveness in its representation of its members' interests.

Company Policy focuses on all elements of workers' interests in a multinational company ranging from economic and industrial development, restructuring and reorganisation and working conditions. It covers information and consultation rights at European level (European Works Councils, EWC) as well as participation rights (Company Statute). At the same time the EMF supports the development of a negotiation role in multinational companies. The EMF company policy involves the European Works Councils, the workers' representatives on company boards, the national trade unions and the EMF EWC coordinators.

The Social Dialogue focuses on building lasting dialogue structures with European-level employers' and industry associations in the metal sector. The Social Dialogue is being developed at the metal sectoral level with the employers' organisation CEEMET as well as at the level of sub-sectors such as the shipbuilding and steel industries. Through the Social Dialogue the EMF seeks to develop common solutions to meet the challenges of global competition and industrial change affecting the metalworking sector across Europe. The EMF strives to improve the economic and social situation of workers by reconciling the legitimate social interests of workers and the need for competitive industries.

== Tools ==
The EMF seeks consensus and reconciliation of interests through information, consultation and negotiation.

The most important tools are: Dialogue with and the submission of demands to European institutions such as the council, Parliament and the commission. Dialogue and the proactive defence of workers' demands in the context of cooperation with European metal industry employers, industry federations and multinational companies. Initiating and coordinating cross-border European actions aimed at enforcing union demands in the European metal industry. The negotiation of positions and framework agreements on the basis of the EMF Statutes. Information and guidance about developments at European level.

== Statutes & Work Programme ==
The statutes of the European Metalworkers' Federation were adopted by the second EMF Congress that took place on 13–14 June 2003 in Prague.

The Statutes consist the following headlines: I. Aim, Name, Admission, Object, Composition II. Organs and decision making III. Finances Appendix I: List of EMF Affiliates List of Associate members Appendix II Rules for EMF elections Work Programme

The EMF Work Programme was adopted by the second Congress on 13–14 June 2003 in Prague.

The Work Programme contains the following headlines: Introduction Collective Bargaining Industrial Policy Automobile Aerospace Steel Information and Communication Technologies Shipbuilding Defence Lifts Training and Education Equal Opportunities Company Policy Social Dialogue Enlargement Infrastructure Needs Training Needs

== Congress ==
The congress is the highest EMF statutory body and meets every four years. It is composed of 250 delegates and advisors from organisations affiliated to the EMF. Congress takes decisions regarding elections, affiliations, financial issues, the Statutes, the basic policy guidelines and the work programme of the EMF. The latest Congress took place on 13–14 June 2003 in Prague and the next Congress takes place in Lisbon on 6–7 June 2007.

== Executive committee ==
The executive committee is the decision-making body of the EMF in between Congresses. The executive committee consists of 65 members from 67 affiliated organisations in 30 countries and meets twice a year. It is chaired by EMF President Tony Janssen.

== Steering Committee ==
The Steering Committee was established in June 1999 as a body that shall advise and support the Secretaiat in the preparation and implementation of the executive committee decisions. It comprises the President, the vice-president and regional representatives from the seven EMF regions as established by the Statutes.

== Secretariat ==
The Secretariat implements the decsisons of the executive committee and prepares the meetings. It consists of 16 staff members and is led by the General Secretary.

== Sector Committees ==
=== Automotive ===
The car sector and its related sub-sectors is a key player in European industry. The EMF contributes to all issues related to industrial policy, especially regarding the future of the automotive industry in Europe. Technological development and environmental needs contribute to transport policy.

=== ICT ===
The ICT sector in Europe is facing a number of challenges, including mass redundancies in developed countries, skill shortages, outsourcing and off-shoring, structural mutation from hardware production, and increasing pressure on salary levels and benefits. A trade union strategy has to address these challenges and seek to create conditions which allow a combination of competitiveness, flexibility and social cohesion for Europe. Driven by globalisation, swift technological and process changes, global sourcing and stock market fluctuation, the ICT sector is constantly restructuring.

=== Non-ferrous metals ===
The situation within the non-ferrous metals sector clearly indicates that steps have to be taken to protect this industry, its locations and employees in Europe and provide it with real prospects for sustainability and further development.

=== Steel ===
The European Steel industry has undergone substantial changes due to the concentration process started in the mid-1990s, in parallel with the privatisation of the state owned steel companies and the globalisation of the steel market. This process has been given fresh impetus by the surge in demand for steel in China and the substantial increases in the price of all steel products during 2004. The EMF is convinced that there will be further concentration of production in the industry and that further company mergers will follow.

=== Ad hoc group mechanical engineering ===
In 2005 the EMF has re-introduced a working structure for the engineering sector in order to develop policies for the sustainable development of the sector and guarantee a stable and highly skilled labour in Europe.

== Leadership ==
=== Secretaries ===
1971: Günter Köpke
1978: Bert Thierron
1997: Hans Fluger
1999: Reinhard Kuhlmann
2005: Peter Scherrer
2011: Ulrich Eckelman

=== Presidents ===
1971: Gust Wallaert
1974: Hugh Scanlon
1979: Terry Duffy
1986: Bill Jordan
1995: Tony Janssen
2007: Renzo Ambrosetti
