= Jens Beeck =

German lawyer and politician (born 1969)

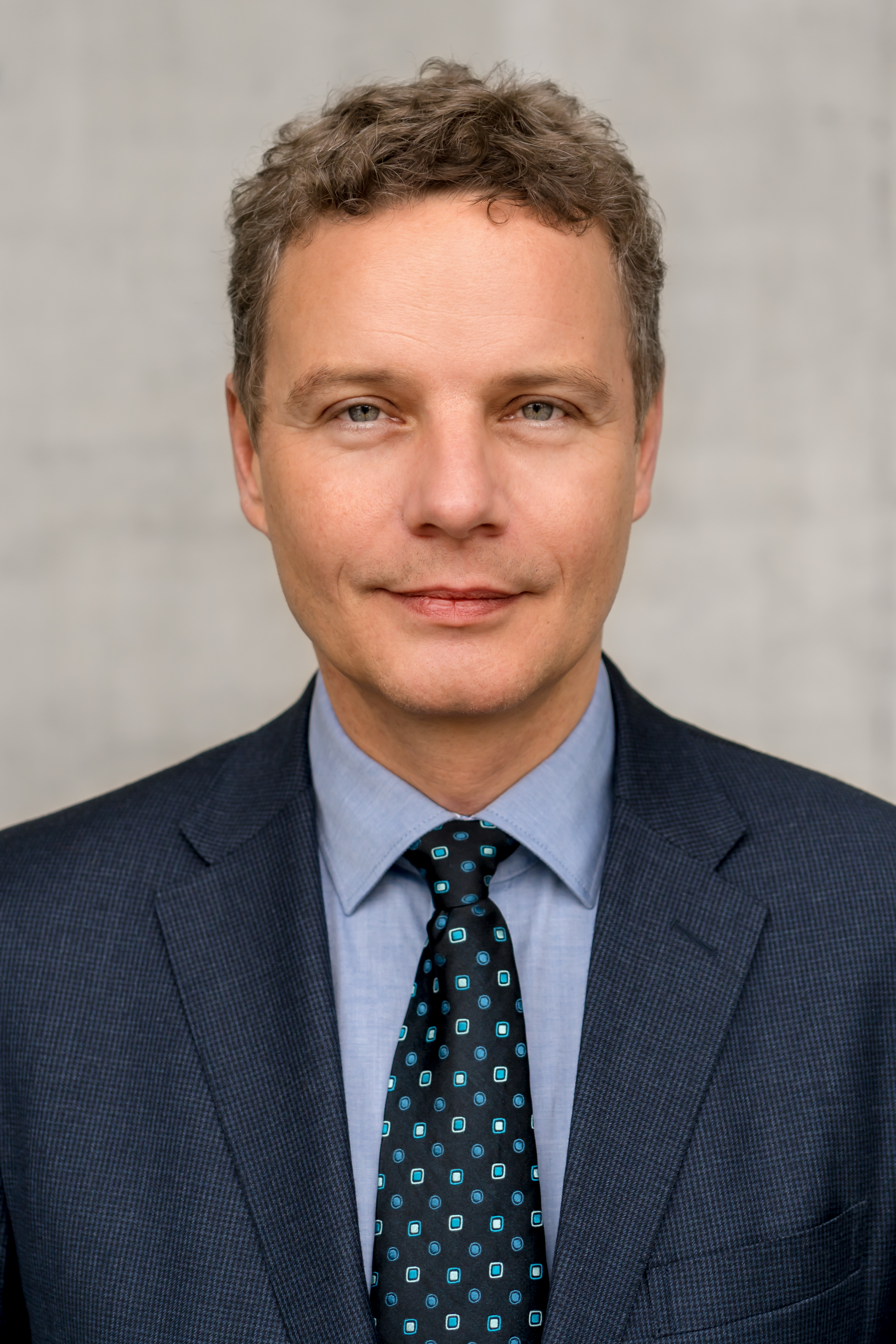
- Beeck in 2017

Member of the Bundestag for Lower Saxony
- In office 24 October 2017 – 26 October 2021
- Constituency: FDP List

Personal details
- Born: 19 September 1969 (age 56) Münster, West Germany
- Party: Free Democratic Party
- Occupation: Lawyer

Jens Beeck (born 19 September 1969) is a German lawyer and politician of the Free Democratic Party (FDP) who served as a member of the Bundestag from the state of Lower Saxony from 2017 to 2025.

== Early life and career ==
Beeck completed his school education in 1988 with the Abitur. Afterwards he worked in the catering trade in the Black Forest before he began his studies of law. Beeck passed his first state examination in law in 1996.

Beeck then worked as an administrative employee at the Nordhorn employment office and completed his basic military service. After his legal clerkship he completed his second state examination in 2000. Since 2001 Beeck has been working as an independent lawyer with his own law firm.

== Political career ==
Beeck joined the FDP in 1987. He became a member of the Bundestag in the 2017 national elections.

In parliament, Beeck served on the Committee on Economic Cooperation and Development (2018–2021), the Committee on Labor and Social Affairs (2018–2025) and the Committee on Foreign Affairs (2021–2025). He was his parliamentary group's spokesperson for the interests of people with disabilities.

In addition to his committee assignments, Beeck was part of the German Parliamentary Friendship Group for Relations with the States of Central America. In 2023, he co-founded a cross-party working group on dogs.

In the negotiations to form a so-called traffic light coalition of the Social Democratic Party (SPD), the Green Party and the FDP following the 2021 federal elections, Beeck was part of his party's delegation in the working group on children, youth and families, co-chaired by Serpil Midyatli, Katrin Göring-Eckardt and Stephan Thomae.

== Other activities ==
- Bundesarbeitsgemeinschaft Inklusionsfirmen (BAG IF), Member of the Advisory Board
