= STEAG =

Company in Essen, Germany

Steag GmbH, the former "Steinkohlen-Elektrizität AG" ("Anthracite Electricity Company"), is a German power company. As of 2022, it is Germany's fifth largest utility. It operates also in the field of transport, processing and distribution of hard coal, coke and byproducts from coal processing, as also in the field of gas supply, transport and trading.

== History ==
As a result of restructuring of RAG Group, STEAG became a part of Evonik Industries AG in September 2007. In 2014, the company was sold to holding company KSBG, which bundles the shares held by utilities in the western German municipalities of Duisburg, Dortmund, Bochum, Essen, Oberhausen and Dinslaken.

== Business ==
The company operates ten hard coal-fired power plants, of which seven are located in Germany, Colombia and Philippines. It is on the Global coal exit list.
