= Hugh Scanlon =

British trade union leader

The Right Honourable The Lord Scanlon
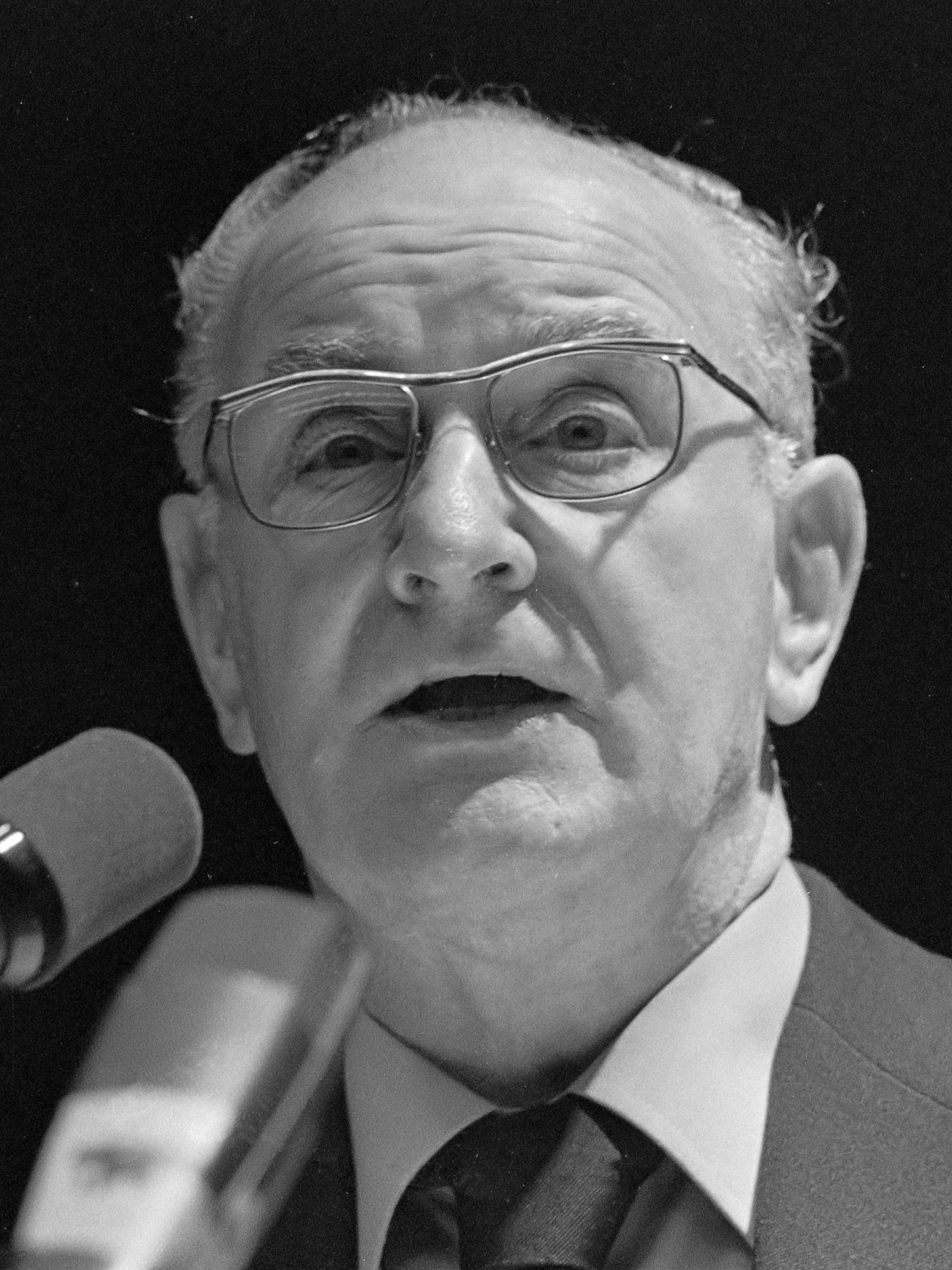

Member of the House of Lords
- Lord Temporal
- Life peerage 19 February 1979 – 27 January 2004

Personal details
- Born: 26 October 1913
- Died: 27 January 2004 (aged 90)

Hugh Parr Scanlon, Baron Scanlon (26 October 1913 – 27 January 2004) was a British trade union leader.

Scanlon was born in Melbourne, to parents who had emigrated from Britain. His mother brought him back from Australia to the UK when he was two years old; she was by that time a widow. He attended Stretford Elementary School in Stretford near Manchester, which he left at the age of 11 to become an apprentice instrument maker at a local engineering firm where he first joined his union, the Amalgamated Engineering Union (AEU). Scanlon next worked at the Metropolitan-Vickers engineering plant at Trafford Park where he became a shop steward, before attaining the position of convener for the plant. He joined the Communist Party of Great Britain in 1937 following the events of the Spanish Civil War and made use of its networks and organising skills to rise through the union, becoming a district official in 1947.

Although Scanlon formally abandoned communism in 1954, he continued as a "broad left" candidate within the union; winning the leadership in 1968. Scanlon and TGWU leader Jack Jones were known by the press as "The Terrible Twins" for their opposition to both Labour Party and Conservative Party attempts to restrict the power of the unions – Labour prime minister Harold Wilson once famously telling him to "get your tanks off my lawn." In 1969 Home Secretary James Callaghan requested action that would hinder Scanlon's career, which was raised in cabinet, and further discussed with Secretary of State for Employment Barbara Castle. A plan for detrimental leaks to the media was placed in the Foreign Office propaganda Information Research Department, and its head prepared a briefing paper. However information about how this was effected has not been released under the thirty-year rule under a section of the Public Records Act permitting national security exemptions.

When Edward Heath failed to form a coalition with the Liberals in 1974 and Labour formed a minority government, Scanlon and Jones acted as go-betweens for Labour, communicating the party's demands back and forth to Congress House. They were the prime movers within the union movement of the Social Contract which introduced strict wage controls and limits on strike action. This culminated in the 1978/79 Winter of Discontent, which was followed by the election of the Conservative Party, led by Margaret Thatcher, in 1979. Earlier in the decade, Scanlon had been a vocal opponent of Britain's membership of the EEC.

Scanlon's political beliefs led to his being effectively blacklisted by the British security service from 1966 to 1977, it emerged years later. In 1977, he was prevented from becoming chairman of British Shipbuilders because MI5 advised that he should not see documents marked "confidential" or above. Two years earlier, he was refused security clearance to join the British Gas Board, but was later appointed after his files were examined.

He was elevated to the House of Lords as a Life Peer on 19 February 1979, taking the title Baron Scanlon, of Davyhulme in the County of Greater Manchester.

Trade union offices
Preceded by William Carron	President of the Amalgamated Engineering Union; 1968–1978	Succeeded by Terence Duffy
Preceded by George Smith and Sidney Greene	Trades Union Congress representative to the AFL-CIO; 1971; With: Cyril Plant	Succeeded by Walter Anderson and Ronald Rigby
Preceded by Gust Wallaert	President of the European Metalworkers' Federation; 1974–1979	Succeeded by Terry Duffy
Preceded by Marie Patterson	President of the Confederation of Shipbuilding and Engineering Unions; 1978–1979	Succeeded by Ken Baker
