= Amalgamated Engineering Union =

Trade union in the UK

- Merged into: Amalgamated Engineering and Electrical Union
- Founded: 1920
- Dissolved: 1 May 1992
- Headquarters: 110 Peckham Road, London
- Location: United Kingdom
- Members: 1,483,400 (1979)
- Publication: AUEW Journal
- Affiliations: TUC, CSEU, IMF, Labour

The Amalgamated Engineering Union (AEU) was a major British trade union. It merged with the Electrical, Electronic, Telecommunications and Plumbing Union to form the Amalgamated Engineering and Electrical Union in 1992.

== History ==
The history of the union can be traced back to the formation of the Journeymen Steam Engine, Machine Makers' and Millwrights' Friendly Society, in 1826, popularly known as the "Old Mechanics". They invited a large number of other unions to become part of what became the Amalgamated Society of Engineers (ASE).

In 1920, the ASE put out a fresh call for other unions to merge with it in a renamed Amalgamated Engineering Union (AEU). Seventeen unions balloted their members on a possible merger, and nine voted in favour of amalgamation:

- Amalgamated Association of Brass Turners, Fitters, Finishers and Coppersmiths
- Amalgamated Instrument Makers' Society
- Amalgamated Society of General Tool Makers, Engineers and Machinists
- East of Scotland Brass Founders' Society
- London United Metal Turners', Fitters' and Finishers' Society
- North of England Brass Turners', Fitters' and Finishers' Society
- Steam Engine Makers' Society (SEM)
- United Kingdom Society of Amalgamated Smiths and Strikers
- United Machine Workers' Association

The resulting union had a membership of 450,000, about 300,000 coming from the ASE.

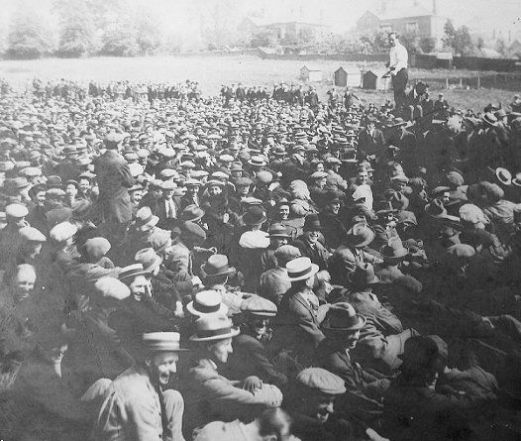
Jack Leckie, a Scottish trade union activist and communist, addressing a rally at Radford Road, Coventry, during the 1922 Engineers' Lockout.

In 1922 employers, represented by the Engineering Employers' Federation, launched an industry-wide lockout in an attempt to reverse the gains made by the AEU during WWI and its aftermath. Exploiting the downturn in economic conditions in the engineering industry, they demanded the union forfeit control over overtime. The lockout lasted from 11 March to 13 June and involved 260,000 workers, 90,000 of them represented by the AEU. The lockout ended with the union conceding some of the employers' demands.

The AEU continued to grow and absorb smaller unions. From 1926, it accepted members who had not completed an apprenticeship. In 1933, it had 168,000 members, and 390,900 by the end of the decade. Its largest membership growth came during the Second World War when its all-male membership voted to admit women for the first time and 100,000 joined almost immediately, membership reaching 825,000 by 1943. It admitted women due to the increasing role of female industrial workers in the British home front, as well as to prevent either female workers joining rival unions or non-union female workers from undercutting union wages. However, during World War II the AEU also lost its overseas branches in Australia, New Zealand, and South Africa, which became independent unions.

From the 1940s, the AEU also absorbed various smaller unions: the Amalgamated Society of Glass Works Engineers, Amalgamated Society of Vehicle Builders, Carpenters and Mechanics, Amalgamated Machine, Engine and Iron Grinders' and Glaziers' Society, Leeds Spindle and Flyer Makers' Trade and Friendly Society, United Operative Spindle and Flyer Makers' Trade and Friendly Society, and the Turners', Fitters' and Instrument Makers' Union.

The AEU merged with the Amalgamated Union of Foundry Workers (AUFW) on 1 January 1968 to form the Amalgamated Union of Engineering and Foundry Workers (AEF), and with the Draughtsmen and Allied Technicians' Association (DATA) and Constructional Engineering Union in 1971 to form the Amalgamated Union of Engineering Workers (AUEW). The union was now organised on a federal basis, with four sections: Engineering, Foundry, Construction, and Technical, Administrative and Supervisory (TASS). This approach was not a success, as the various sections fell into dispute with each other. In 1984, the Engineering, Foundry and Construction Sections were merged and in 1986 adopted the name Amalgamated Engineering Union once more, while the TASS remained separate and, in 1988, it became entirely independent of the union once more.

Despite this series of amalgamations, declines in the number of workers in heavy industry saw membership drop from a peak of 1,483,400 in 1979, to 858,000 in 1986. The AEU became a mainstay of the moderate right in the trade union movement through the 1980s and 1990s, leading the manufacturing unions in 1989–1991 in a successful push for a shorter working week, but failing to merge with a number of unions, notally the Union of Construction, Allied Trades and Technicians.

In 1992 the AEU finally achieved a merger with the Electrical, Electronic, Telecommunications and Plumbing Union, EETPU, after a hundred years of off and on discussions. The new union took the name Amalgamated Engineering and Electrical Union.

== Election results ==
Like the ASE before it, the AEU affiliated to the Labour Party, sponsoring candidates at each election, many of whom won seats in Parliament.

Election	Constituency	Candidate	Votes	Percentage	Position
1922 general election	Aberdeen North	Frank Herbert Rose	10,958	55.7	1
1922 general election	Ashton-under-Lyne	Tom Gillinder	8,834	42.4	2
1922 general election	Basingstoke	Samuel Ledbury	3,035	13.6	3
1922 general election	Camborne	Tom Proctor	4,502	21.9	3
1922 general election	Dumbarton Burghs	David Kirkwood	16,397	64.5	1
1922 general election	Edmonton	Frank Broad	8,407	45.1	1
1922 general election	Gateshead	John Brotherton	18,795	43.8	1
1922 general election	Newcastle upon Tyne West	David Adams	11,654	43.9	1
1922 general election	Newton	Robert Young	12,312	55.6	1
1922 general election	Plymouth Drake	James Gorman	8,359	31.4	2
1922 general election	Rochdale	Stanley Burgess	15,774	38.8	1
1922 general election	Stalybridge and Hyde	Percy Horace Wood	7,578	21.6	3
1922 general election	The Wrekin	Richard Edward Jones	10,603	47.6	2
1922 general election	Woolwich West	John Thomas Sheppard	9,550	39.8	2
1922 general election	Yeovil	William Kelly	9,581	38.3	2
1923 general election	Aberdeen North	Frank Herbert Rose	9,138	50.6	1
1923 general election	Edmonton	Frank Broad	10,735	64.4	1
1923 general election	Gateshead	John Brotherton	16,689	41.1	2
1923 general election	Newcastle upon Tyne West	David Adams	11,527	43.2	2
1923 general election	Newton	Robert Young	12,492	59.9	1
1923 general election	Rochdale	Stanley Burgess	13,525	32.6	2
1924 general election	Dumbarton Burghs	David Kirkwood	14,562	59.2	1
1924 general election	Edmonton	Frank Broad	11,614	53.1	1
1924 general election	Newton	Robert Young	12,875	56.1	1
1929 general election	Dartford	John Edmund Mills	26,871	50.6	1
1929 general election	Dumbarton Burghs	David Kirkwood	19,193	63.1	1
1929 general election	Edmonton	Frank Broad	17,555	59.3	1
1929 general election	Newton	Robert Young	18,176	60.5	1
1931 by-election	Sunderland	James Thomas Brownlie	30,074	39.8	2
1931 general election	Barrow	David Adams	15,835	43.2	2
1935 general election	Consett	David Adams	25,419	58.7	1
1935 general election	Dumbarton Burghs	David Kirkwood	20,409	65.2	1
1935 general election	Newton	Robert Young	19,992	58.5	1
1945 general election	Aberdeen South	William McLaine	17,398	42.3	2
1945 general election	Dumbarton Burghs	David Kirkwood	16,262	65.2	1
1945 general election	Manchester Hulme	Frederick Lee	12,034	55.6	1
1945 general election	Newton	Robert Young	25,197	62.0	1
1948 by-election	Edmonton	Austen Albu	26,164	53.4	1
1949 by-election	Leeds West	Charles Pannell	21,935	55.2	1
1950 general election	Bury and Radcliffe	John Owen	25,705	44.4	2
1950 general election	East Dunbartonshire	David Kirkwood	25,943	52.7	1
1950 general election	Edmonton	Austen Albu	34,897	55.1	1
1950 general election	Hayes and Harlington	Walter Ayles	22,490	60.1	1
1950 general election	Keighley	Charles Hobson	21,833	48.5	1
1950 general election	Leeds West	Charles Pannell	21,339	51.6	1
1950 general election	Newcastle upon Tyne North	W. H. Shackleton	16,860	35.9	2
1950 general election	Newton	Frederick Lee	31,832	59.1	1
1950 general election	Rochdale	Joseph Hale	25,484	44.9	1
1950 general election	Southall	George Pargiter	27,107	53.9	1
1951 general election	Cirencester and Tewkesbury	Albert Sumbler	18,353	40.5	2
1951 general election	East Dunbartonshire	Cyril Bence	26,678	51.2	1
1951 general election	Edmonton	Austen Albu	36,023	58.4	1
1951 general election	Esher	Percy McNally	15,334	28.6	2
1951 general election	Glasgow Scotstoun	John Robertson	20,872	49.3	2
1951 general election	Hayes and Harlington	Walter Ayles	23,823	64.8	1
1951 general election	Keighley	Charles Hobson	23,743	52.8	1
1951 general election	Leeds West	Charles Pannell	22,357	54.1	1
1951 general election	Newton	Frederick Lee	31,374	58.3	1
1951 general election	Rochdale	Joseph Hale	27,343	49.6	2
1951 general election	Southall	George Pargiter	29,123	57.9	1
1951 general election	Southend West	Henry Lyall	17,352	30.9	2
1951 general election	Stockport North	John Owen	20,893	44.9	2
1955 general election	Barry	Dan Jones	19,722	42.1	2
1955 general election	Bridgwater	Albert Sumbler	17,170	40.8	2
1955 general election	East Dunbartonshire	Cyril Bence	24,216	48.7	1
1955 general election	Edmonton	Austen Albu	30,232	56.6	1
1955 general election	Glasgow Woodside	John McGinley	15,543	43.9	2
1955 general election	High Peak	Neil McBride	13,652	34.6	2
1955 general election	Keighley	Charles Hobson	19,414	46.5	1
1955 general election	Leeds West	Charles Pannell	24,576	52.8	1
1955 general election	Newton	Frederick Lee	29,299	57.9	1
1955 general election	Rochdale	Jack McCann	24,928	48.5	2
1955 general election	Southall	George Pargiter	25,207	57.2	1
1955 general election	Stockport South	Ernie Roberts	16,612	44.5	2
1958 by-election	Rochdale	Jack McCann	22,133	44.7	1
1959 general election	Burnley	Dan Jones	27,675	57.0	1
1959 general election	Doncaster	Ted Garrett	22,935	46.4	2
1959 general election	East Dunbartonshire	Cyril Bence	27,942	51.1	1
1959 general election	Edmonton	Austen Albu	25,598	50.5	1
1959 general election	Glasgow Scotstoun	William Small	24,690	53.7	1
1959 general election	Glasgow Woodside	John McGinley	14,483	43.1	2
1959 general election	High Peak	Bernard Conlan	13,827	34.0	2
1959 general election	Keighley	Charles Hobson	20,456	49.8	2
1959 general election	Leeds West	Charles Pannell	25,878	54.9	1
1959 general election	Newton	Frederick Lee	31,041	57.4	1
1959 general election	Oxford	Leslie Anderton	18,310	34.8	2
1959 general election	Rochdale	Jack McCann	21,689	41.5	1
1959 general election	Southall	George Pargiter	22,285	52.7	1
1959 general election	South Northamptonshire	Arthur Richardson	18,292	43.0	2
1959 general election	Stockport South	Stan Orme	17,982	46.7	2
1963 by-election	Swansea East	Neil McBride	18,909	61.1	1
1964 general election	Bradford North	Ben Ford	17,905	43.6	1
1964 general election	Bristol North West	David Watkins	21,030	42.9	2
1964 general election	Burnley	Dan Jones	25,244	56.8	1
1964 general election	Doncaster	Harold Walker	23,845	49.9	1
1964 general election	East Dunbartonshire	Cyril Bence	32,948	55.6	1
1964 general election	Edmonton	Austen Albu	24,373	49.2	1
1964 general election	Gateshead East	Bernard Conlan	26,633	64.5	1
1964 general election	Glasgow Scotstoun	William Small	27,036	61.6	1
1964 general election	Keighley	John Binns	17,816	43.0	1
1964 general election	Leeds West	Charles Pannell	22,968	50.5	1
1964 general election	Newton	Frederick Lee	32,932	56.0	1
1964 general election	Paisley	John Robertson	26,318	52.9	1
1964 general election	Rochdale	Jack McCann	22,927	46.7	1
1964 general election	Salford West	Stan Orme	20,490	55.5	1
1964 general election	Southall	George Pargiter	18,041	48.0	1
1964 general election	Swansea East	Neil McBride	30,904	73.0	1
1964 general election	Tottenham	Norman Atkinson	19,458	54.7	1
1964 general election	Truro	Douglas Grazier	14,224	31.5	2
1964 general election	Wallsend	Ted Garrett	39,841	60.4	1
1966 general election	Bradford North	Ben Ford	21,727	55.4	1
1966 general election	Burnley	Dan Jones	25,583	60.4	1
1966 general election	Consett	David Watkins	29,753	73.3	1
1966 general election	Doncaster	Harold Walker	25,777	56.7	1
1966 general election	East Dunbartonshire	Cyril Bence	32,988	52.2	1
1966 general election	Edmonton	Austen Albu	26,422	58.6	1
1966 general election	Gateshead East	Bernard Conlan	27,628	69.6	1
1966 general election	Glasgow Scotstoun	William Small	27,320	61.8	1
1966 general election	Keighley	John Binns	22,039	55.0	1
1966 general election	Leeds West	Charles Pannell	24,391	56.3	1
1966 general election	Newton	Frederick Lee	36,901	62.8	1
1966 general election	Paisley	John Robertson	28,074	60.0	1
1966 general election	Rochdale	Jack McCann	24,481	52.4	1
1966 general election	Salford West	Stan Orme	19,237	59.2	1
1966 general election	Swansea East	Neil McBride	30,290	75.4	1
1966 general election	Tottenham	Norman Atkinson	17,367	65.3	1
1966 general election	Wallsend	Ted Garrett	39,744	65.2	1
1970 general election	Aberdeen North	Robert Hughes	27,707	62.1	1
1970 general election	Bradford North	Ben Ford	20,141	52.1	1
1970 general election	Burnley	Dan Jones	24,200	57.0	1
1970 general election	Consett	David Watkins	28,985	70.9	1
1970 general election	Doncaster	Harold Walker	22,658	50.7	1
1970 general election	Edmonton	Austen Albu	20,626	49.1	1
1970 general election	Gateshead East	Bernard Conlan	28,524	64.8	1
1970 general election	Glasgow Scotstoun	William Small	26,492	57.4	1
1970 general election	Keighley	John Binns	20,341	49.3	2
1970 general election	Leeds West	Charles Pannell	21,618	51.8	1
1970 general election	Louth	James Murray	16,403	33.9	2
1970 general election	Merthyr Tydfil	Taliesin Lloyd	9,234	28.7	2
1970 general election	Newton	Frederick Lee	34,873	52.5	1
1970 general election	Paisley	John Robertson	25,429	54.1	1
1970 general election	Rochdale	Jack McCann	19,247	41.6	1
1970 general election	Salford West	Stan Orme	16,986	54.3	1
1970 general election	South Northamptonshire	Gordon Roberts	21,131	37.2	2
1970 general election	South West Norfolk	Leslie Potter	16,572	42.7	2
1970 general election	Swansea East	Neil McBride	28,183	68.5	1
1970 general election	Tottenham	Norman Atkinson	17,367	61.3	1
1970 general election	Wallsend	Ted Garrett	39,065	61.3	1
1973 by-election	Dundee East	George Machin	14,411	32.7	1
1974 Feb general election	Aberdeen North	Robert Hughes	23,193	47.7	1
1974 Feb general election	Bradford North	Ben Ford	22,381	43.3	1
1974 Feb general election	Bridgwater	Roger Undy	16,786	29.5	2
1974 Feb general election	Burnley	Dan Jones	21,108	50.4	1
1974 Feb general election	Carlton	James Murray	20,147	33.5	2
1974 Feb general election	Chorley	George Rodgers	25,440	40.3	1
1974 Feb general election	Consett	David Watkins	27,401	61.1	1
1974 Feb general election	Coventry North East	George Park	30,496	63.9	1
1974 Feb general election	Doncaster	Harold Walker	23,041	47.9	1
1974 Feb general election	Dundee East	George Machin	17,100	33.7	2
1974 Feb general election	Gateshead East	Bernard Conlan	27,269	55.2	1
1974 Feb general election	Glasgow Garscadden	William Small	21,035	52.3	1
1974 Feb general election	Gloucester	Alf Pegler	18,215	35.2	2
1974 Feb general election	Leeds West	Joseph Dean	19,436	42.1	1
1974 Feb general election	Newton	John Evans	38,369	49.3	1
1974 Feb general election	Paisley	John Robertson	23,820	48.4	1
1974 Feb general election	St Pancras North	Jock Stallard	14,761	52.8	1
1974 Feb general election	Salford West	Stan Orme	16,808	51.3	1
1974 Feb general election	Swansea East	Neil McBride	28,537	66.3	1
1974 Feb general election	Tottenham	Norman Atkinson	16,999	54.8	1
1974 Feb general election	Wallsend	Ted Garrett	41,811	62.0	1
1974 Oct general election	Aberdeen North	Robert Hughes	23,130	50.9	1
1974 Oct general election	Bradford North	Ben Ford	22,841	49.1	1
1974 Oct general election	Burnley	Dan Jones	21,642	54.8	1
1974 Oct general election	Chorley	George Rodgers	27,290	44.1	1
1974 Oct general election	Consett	David Watkins	27,123	67.0	1
1974 Oct general election	Coventry North East	George Park	26,489	59.5	1
1974 Oct general election	Doncaster	Harold Walker	22,177	51.3	1
1974 Oct general election	Dundee East	George Machin	15,137	32.7	2
1974 Oct general election	Gateshead East	Bernard Conlan	27,620	61.9	1
1974 Oct general election	Glasgow Garscadden	William Small	19,737	50.9	1
1974 Oct general election	Leeds West	Joseph Dean	20,669	49.6	1
1974 Oct general election	Newton	John Evans	38,956	53.3	1
1974 Oct general election	Paisley	John Robertson	21,368	44.8	1
1974 Oct general election	Rochdale	John Connell	17,339	36.8	2
1974 Oct general election	St Pancras North	Jock Stallard	14,155	58.5	1
1974 Oct general election	Salford West	Stan Orme	17,112	57.2	1
1974 Oct general election	Tottenham	Norman Atkinson	15,708	58.8	1
1974 Oct general election	Wallsend	Ted Garrett	37,180	58.1	1
1979 general election	Aberdeen North	Robert Hughes	26,771	59.3	1
1979 general election	Bradford North	Ben Ford	25,069	50.9	1
1979 general election	Burnley	Dan Jones	20,172	50.8	1
1979 general election	Chorley	George Rodgers	28,546	43.0	2
1979 general election	Consett	David Watkins	26,708	61.3	1
1979 general election	Coventry North East	George Park	27,010	57.3	1
1979 general election	Doncaster	Harold Walker	22,184	48.9	1
1979 general election	Gateshead East	Bernard Conlan	28,776	61.2	1
1979 general election	Hackney North and Stoke Newington	Ernie Roberts	14,688	51.6	1
1979 general election	Kilmarnock	William McKelvey	25,718	52.6	1
1979 general election	Leeds West	Joseph Dean	21,290	49.4	1
1979 general election	Manchester Blackley	Ken Eastham	20,346	50.4	1
1979 general election	Newton	John Evans	41,466	51.4	1
1979 general election	Rochdale	John Connell	16,878	34.3	2
1979 general election	St Pancras North	Jock Stallard	14,556	54.2	1
1979 general election	Salford West	Stan Orme	18,411	61.5	1
1979 general election	Tottenham	Norman Atkinson	16,299	56.9	1
1979 general election	Wallsend	Ted Garrett	38,214	55.1	1
1983 general election	Aberdeen North	Robert Hughes	19,262	47.0	1
1983 general election	Coventry North East	George Park	22,190	47.8	1
1983 general election	Doncaster Central	Harold Walker	21,154	42.0	1
1983 general election	Edinburgh Leith	Ron Brown	16,177	39.7	1
1983 general election	Gateshead East	Bernard Conlan	22,981	48.3	1
1983 general election	Hackney North and Stoke Newington	Ernie Roberts	18,989	52.0	1
1983 general election	Kilmarnock and Loudoun	William McKelvey	20,250	43.6	1
1983 general election	Leeds West	Joseph Dean	15,860	34.0	2
1983 general election	Manchester Blackley	Ken Eastham	20,132	48.1	1
1983 general election	St Helens North	John Evans	25,334	47.9	1
1983 general election	Salford East	Stan Orme	21,373	53.7	1
1983 general election	Tottenham	Norman Atkinson	22,423	52.0	1
1983 general election	Wallsend	Ted Garrett	26,615	50.1	1
1985 by-election	Tyne Bridge	David Clelland	13,517	57.8	1
1986 by-election	Knowsley North	George Howarth	17,403	56.3	1
1987 general election	Aberdeen North	Robert Hughes	24,145	54.7	1
1987 general election	Bury North	David Crausby	21,186	37.8	2
1987 general election	Caithness and Sutherland	Allan Byron	3,437	14.9	3
1987 general election	Doncaster Central	Harold Walker	26,266	51.2	1
1987 general election	Edinburgh Leith	Ron Brown	21,104	49.3	1
1987 general election	Feltham and Heston	Charles Hinds	22,325	37.4	2
1987 general election	Glasgow Pollok	Jimmy Dunnachie	23,239	63.1	1
1987 general election	Kilmarnock and Loudoun	William McKelvey	23,713	48.5	1
1987 general election	Knowsley North	George Howarth	27,454	69.9	1
1987 general election	Manchester Blackley	Ken Eastham	22,476	52.4	1
1987 general election	St Helens North	John Evans	28,989	53.7	1
1987 general election	Salford East	Stan Orme	22,555	58.8	1
1987 general election	Sheffield Central	Richard Caborn	25,872	67.7	1
1987 general election	Sheffield Heeley	Bill Michie	28,425	53.4	1
1987 general election	Tyne Bridge	David Clelland	23,131	63.0	1
1987 general election	Wallsend	Ted Garrett	32,709	56.8	1
1992 general election	Aberdeen North	Robert Hughes	18,845	47.0	1
1992 general election	Bolton North East	David Crausby	21,459	44.5	2
1992 general election	Doncaster Central	Harold Walker	27,795	54.3	1
1992 general election	Glasgow Pollok	Jimmy Dunnachie	14,170	43.4	1
1992 general election	Kilmarnock and Loudoun	William McKelvey	22,210	44.8	1
1992 general election	Knowsley North	George Howarth	27,517	77.5	1
1992 general election	Manchester Blackley	Ken Eastham	23,031	60.2	1
1992 general election	Rotherham	Jimmy Boyce	27,933	63.9	1
1992 general election	Salford East	Stan Orme	20,327	60.0	1
1992 general election	Sheffield Central	Richard Caborn	22,764	68.7	1
1992 general election	Sheffield Heeley	Bill Michie	28,005	55.7	1
1992 general election	St Helens North	John Evans	31,930	57.9	1
1992 general election	Tyne Bridge	David Clelland	22,328	67.2	1

== Leadership ==
=== General Secretaries ===
AEU
1920: Tom Mann
1921: Albert Smethurst
1933: Fred A. Smith
1943: Benjamin Gardner
1956: Cecil Hallett
1965: Jim Conway
AEF/AUEW

Year	Construction	Engineering	Foundry	TASS
1968	Created 1971	Jim Conway	William Simpson	Created 1971
1971	Eddie Marsden	Jim Conway	William Simpson	George Doughty
1974	Eddie Marsden	Jim Conway	Bob Garland	Ken Gill
1975	Eddie Marsden	John Boyd	Bob Garland	Ken Gill
1976	John Baldwin	John Boyd	Bob Garland	Ken Gill
1982	John Baldwin	Gavin Laird	Bob Garland	Ken Gill
1984	Gavin Laird			Ken Gill

AEU
1988: Gavin Laird

=== Presidents ===
1920: James Thomas Brownlie
1931: William Harold Hutchinson
1933: John C. Little
1939: Jack Tanner
1953: Robert Openshaw
1956: William Carron
1968: Hugh Scanlon
1978: Terry Duffy
1986: Bill Jordan
