= Bob Ainsworth =

British Labour politician (born 1952)

The Right Honourable Bob Ainsworth
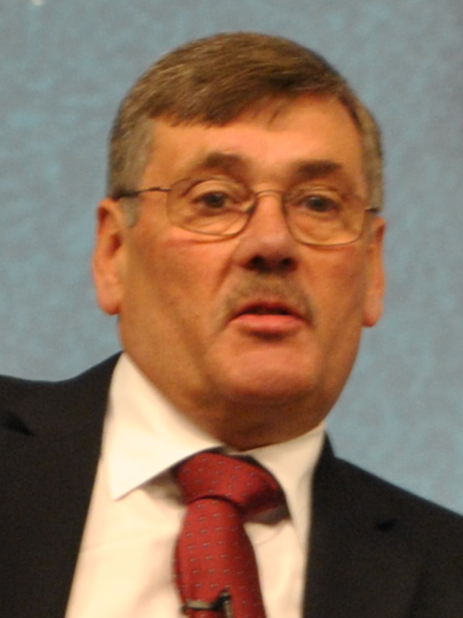
- Ainsworth in 2011

Shadow Secretary of State for Defence
- In office 11 May 2010 – 8 October 2010
- Leader: Harriet Harman; Ed Miliband
- Preceded by: Liam Fox
- Succeeded by: Jim Murphy

Secretary of State for Defence
- In office 5 June 2009 – 11 May 2010
- Prime Minister: Gordon Brown
- Preceded by: John Hutton
- Succeeded by: Liam Fox

Minister for the Armed Forces
- In office 29 June 2007 – 5 May 2009
- Prime Minister: Gordon Brown
- Preceded by: Adam Ingram
- Succeeded by: Bill Rammell

Deputy Chief Government Whip Treasurer of the Household
- In office 13 June 2003 – 28 June 2007
- Prime Minister: Tony Blair
- Preceded by: Keith Hill
- Succeeded by: Nick Brown

Parliamentary Under-Secretary of State for Home Affairs
- In office 11 June 2001 – 13 June 2003
- Prime Minister: Tony Blair
- Preceded by: Mike O'Brien
- Succeeded by: Caroline Flint

Parliamentary Under-Secretary of State for Environment, Transport and the Regions
- In office 25 January 2001 – 7 June 2001
- Prime Minister: Tony Blair
- Preceded by: Chris Mullin
- Succeeded by: The Lord Whitty

Lord Commissioner of the Treasury
- In office 8 May 1997 – 24 January 2001
- Prime Minister: Tony Blair
- Preceded by: Roger Knapman
- Succeeded by: David Clelland

Member of Parliament for Coventry North East
- In office 9 April 1992 – 30 March 2015
- Preceded by: John Hughes
- Succeeded by: Colleen Fletcher

Personal details
- Born: 19 June 1952 (age 74) Coventry, Warwickshire, England
- Party: Labour
- Spouse: Gloria Ainsworth

Robert William Ainsworth (born 19 June 1952) is a British Labour Party politician who was the Member of Parliament (MP) for Coventry North East from 1992 to 2015, and was the Secretary of State for Defence from 2009 to 2010. Following the general election in 2010 he was the Shadow Defence Secretary, but was replaced by Jim Murphy following the election of Labour leader Ed Miliband.

== Early life ==
Ainsworth was born in Coventry on 19 June 1952, and attended the local Foxford Comprehensive School. From 1971 to 1991, he was a sheet metal worker and fitter at Jaguar. He first became active in politics as a trade unionist at the Jaguar Cars plant in Coventry where he worked and served in many union capacities, including as Branch President (in what was later to become part of the Manufacturing, Science and Finance union). In 1984, he was elected to Coventry City Council, became Chair of the Finance Committee, and was deputy leader of the ruling Labour group. He was also Constituency Labour Party chairman.

== Parliamentary career ==
Ainsworth tried to become Labour candidate for Coventry North East in the run-up to the 1987 general election, after George Park MP announced his retirement, but only came third at the selection meeting, behind John Hughes and Ted Knight. In the run-up to the 1992 general election, Hughes was de-selected by the Constituency Labour Party, and Ainsworth became the candidate. He was elected with an 11,676 majority, and stepped down from the city council the following year. At the 1997 general election his majority rose sharply to 22,569, falling back to 15,751 at the 2001 election, and 14,222 at the 2005 election.

On 7 December 2012, Ainsworth announced his intention not to stand at the 2015 general election.

=== In Government ===
Ainsworth was appointed a Labour whip in 1995 and served in government until January 2001 when he was promoted to Parliamentary Under Secretary of State at the former Department for Environment, Transport and the Regions. Following the 2001 general election, Ainsworth was moved to the Home Office as Parliamentary Under-Secretary with responsibility for Drugs and Organised Crime, where he remained until 2003, when he became the Deputy Chief Whip (also known as the Treasurer of the Household). He was appointed to the Privy Council in February 2005. On 29 June 2007, he moved to become the Minister of State for the Armed Forces.

=== Defence Secretary ===
On 5 June 2009, he was appointed to the cabinet by Gordon Brown as Secretary of State for Defence, in what was considered by some to be "a surprise choice". As Defence Secretary, Ainsworth declared in July 2009 that "the government should have offered more support to British troops at the beginning of the wars in Afghanistan and Iraq."

At the Labour Party Conference in Brighton in 2009, Ainsworth stated that sending reinforcements to Afghanistan may not be possible because of a lack of necessary military resources. He said, "Before I agree to any increase in troop numbers I must be sure that the balance of risk is acceptable by evaluating the capacity of the supply chain to properly equip the increased force."

== Expenses ==
In the 2009 Parliamentary expenses scandal, in which a number of MPs were criticised for their expense claims, it was revealed that, in 2007–08, Ainsworth had claimed the maximum permissible amount of £23,083 for second-home allowances, making him the joint highest claimant that year with 142 other MPs. For 2008–09, he claimed £20,304, 269th out of 647 MPs.

== Legalisation of drugs ==
Ainsworth launched the Home Office's "Safer Clubbing" guide in 2002 which provided guidance to nightclub owners on harm reduction relating to recreational drug use.

In December 2010, Ainsworth called for the legalisation and regulation of drugs, arguing it is better for addicts to receive their fixes on prescription rather than relying for their supply on the international criminal gangs that make billions of pounds from the trade. As a Home Office minister, Ainsworth was responsible for drugs policy.

== Personal life ==
In 1974, Ainsworth married Gloria. Together they have two daughters.

In May 2019, Ainsworth revealed that he had voted for the Green Party in that month's European Parliament election. He called it an "I'm Spartacus" moment, stating: "I voted Green in the Euro elections having never voted other than Labour before in my entire life. I didn't intend to make this public, but now Alastair has been expelled for doing the same I feel obliged to do so." This was in reference to the expulsion of Alastair Campbell for revealing that he had voted for the Liberal Democrats at the same election.

Parliament of the United Kingdom
Preceded by John Hughes	Member of Parliament for Coventry North East; 1992–2015	Succeeded by Colleen Fletcher
Political offices
Preceded by Keith Hill	Government Deputy Chief Whip of the House of Commons; 2003–2007	Succeeded by Nick Brown
Preceded by Keith Hill	Treasurer of the Household; 2003–2007	Succeeded by Nick Brown
Preceded by Adam Ingram	Minister of State for the Armed Forces; 2007–2009	Succeeded by Bill Rammell
Preceded by John Hutton	Secretary of State for Defence; 2009–2010	Succeeded by Liam Fox
Preceded by Liam Fox	Shadow Secretary of State for Defence; 2010	Succeeded by Jim Murphy
Party political offices
Preceded by Keith Hill	Labour Deputy Chief Whip in the House of Commons; 2003–2007	Succeeded by Nick Brown
