= Colleen Fletcher =

British politician

Colleen Fletcher OBE
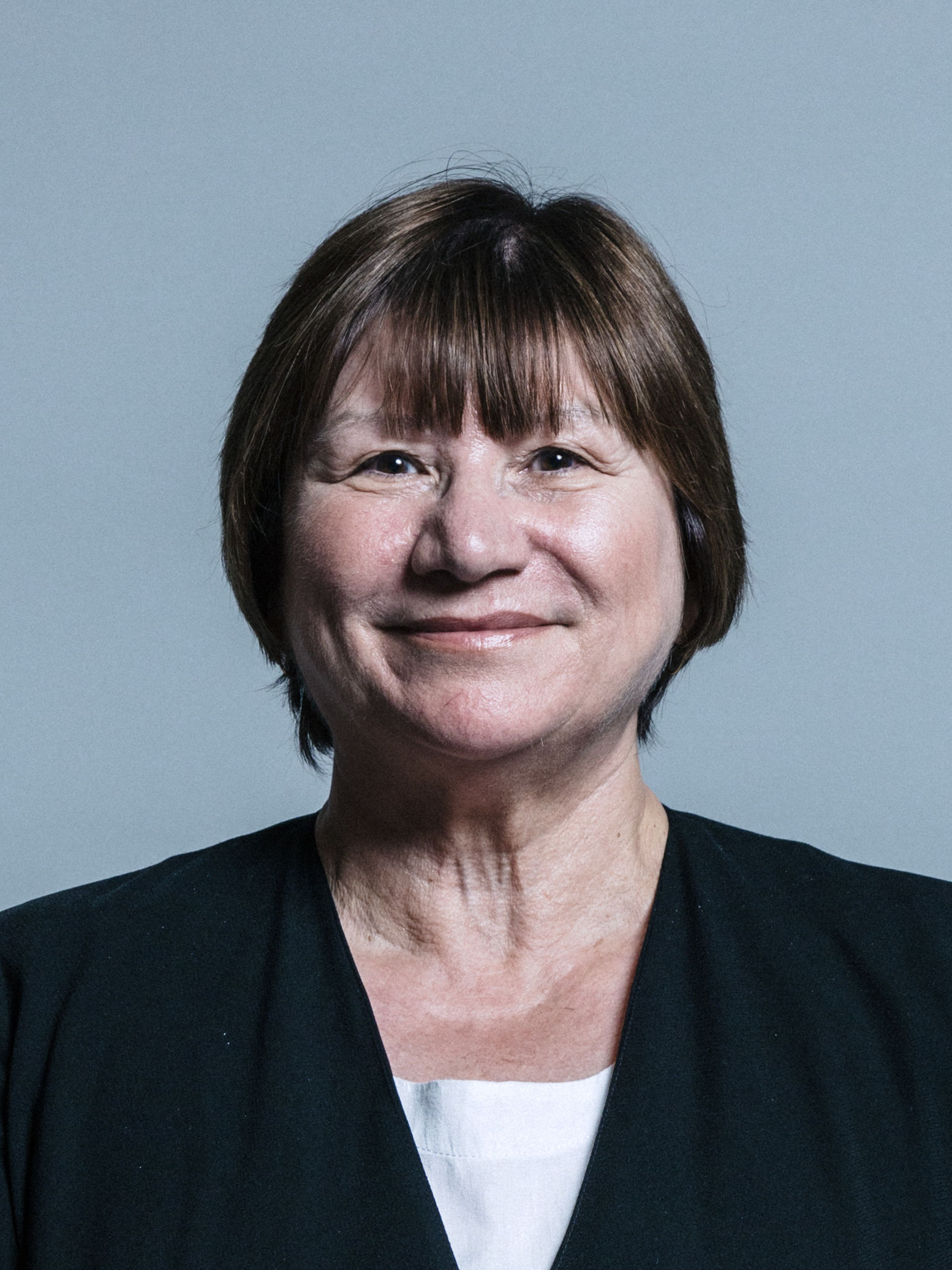
- Official portrait, 2017

Member of Parliament for Coventry North East
- In office 7 May 2015 – 30 May 2024
- Preceded by: Bob Ainsworth
- Succeeded by: Mary Creagh (Note: As MP for Coventry East.)

Personal details
- Born: Colleen Margaret Dalton; 23 November 1954 (age 71) Coventry, England
- Party: Labour

Colleen Margaret Fletcher OBE (née Dalton; born 23 November 1954) is a British politician who served as Member of Parliament (MP) for Coventry North East from 2015 to 2024. A member of the Labour Party, she served as a Member of Coventry City Council prior to her election to Parliament.

== Early life ==
Colleen Margaret Dalton was born on 23 November 1954 in Coventry, England to William Charles and Dot Dalton. Her mother was a Labour councillor on Coventry City Council. She grew up in Coventry and attended Richard Lee Primary School, Lyng Hall School, and the further education college Henley College.

== Political career ==
Fletcher represented Wyken ward on Coventry City Council from 1992 to 2000 and between 2002 and 2004. In 2011, Fletcher was elected as a Labour Party councillor for the Upper Stoke ward on the same council.

In December 2013, she was selected as the Labour candidate for Coventry North East. The seat had been represented by a Labour MP since its formation in 1974. Fletcher was elected as MP with a majority of 11,775 (29.1%). She supported Owen Smith in the 2016 Labour leadership election, and was re-elected at the 2017 general election.

Fletcher served as an opposition whip from 2017 to 2024, under the leadership of Corbyn and later Keir Starmer. As an opposition whip, she served on the Administration Committee and numerous bill committees.

Fletcher supported the United Kingdom (UK) remaining within the European Union (EU) in the 2016 UK EU membership referendum. In the indicative votes in March 2019, she voted for a referendum on a Brexit withdrawal agreement, for the Norway-plus model, and for a customs union with the EU.

On 5 September 2022, she announced she would be standing down at the 2024 general election.

== Personal life ==
Fletcher was married to Ian Fletcher from 1972 until his death in 2018; the couple had two sons.

== Notes ==
Parliament of the United Kingdom
Preceded by Bob Ainsworth	Member of Parliament for Coventry North East; 2015–2024	Constituency abolished
