= Bill John =

British trade unionist and politician

William John (died 1978) was a British trade unionist, who served on the National Executive Committee of the Labour Party.

John joined the Amalgamated Engineering Union and successively became a branch secretary, shop steward, and convenor. In 1961, he began working full-time for the union, based in Bristol, and in 1967 he won election to the union's executive council.

In 1975, John was elected to the National Executive Committee of the Labour Party, serving until his death in 1978.
