= Wal Hannington =

English political activist (1896–1966)

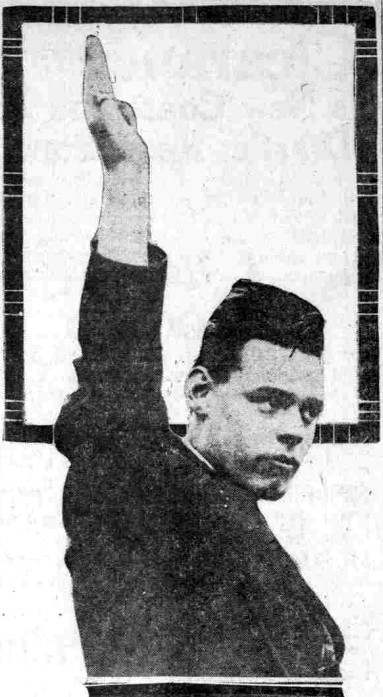
- Hannington in 1922
- Born: 17 June 1896; Camden Town, London, England
- Died: 17 November 1966 (aged 70)
- Citizenship: United Kingdom
- Organization(s): Toolmakers' Society. National Minority Movement
- Known for: Founding member of the Communist Party of Great Britain (CPGB). Leader of the National Unemployed Workers' Movement. National Organiser of the Amalgamated Engineering Union.
- Criminal charges: Charged under the Incitement to Mutiny Act 1797
- Criminal penalty: 12 months jail

Walter Hannington (17 June 1896 – 17 November 1966) was a founding member of the Communist Party of Great Britain and National Organiser of the National Unemployed Workers' Movement, from its formation in 1921 to its end in 1939. In later years, he became an official of the Amalgamated Engineering Union.

== Biography ==
=== Early years ===
Walter Hannington, best known by his nickname "Wal", was born on 17 June 1896 in Camden Town, London. His father was a bricklayer with a large family. He himself was apprenticed to a toolmaker at 14 and joined the Toolmakers' Society during the First World War. He married his wife Winnie in 1917. He joined the British Socialist Party during this period and became a member of the Amalgamated Toolmakers' London committee. He went over to the Amalgamated Engineering Union in the 1920 merger.

=== Political career ===
In 1920 Hannington became a founding member of the Communist Party of Great Britain. From the time of its formation in 1921 until its dissolution in 1939 Hannington was the head of the National Unemployed Workers' Movement, an offshoot of the CPGB.

Hannington was a delegate to the founding conference of the National Minority Movement (NMM) in August 1924. The National Minority Movement, headed by Harry Pollitt, was a pressure group formed by the CPGB to work within the established trade union movement. With only one or two exceptions, the members of the Executive Committee of the NMM were members of the Communist Party. Wal Hannington was one of the inner circle of the executive which controlled the organization, working as a full-time leader of the section dedicated to the metal workers.

In 1925 Hannington was one of 12 members of the Communist Party convicted at the Old Bailey under the Incitement to Mutiny Act 1797 and one of the five defendants sentenced to 12 months' imprisonment.

In 1936 he wrote a book about his experiences as leader of the NUWM, Unemployed Struggles 1919–1936: My Life and Struggles Amongst the Unemployed. He includes accounts of his numerous prison terms, and claims that the government had him and other members of the NUWM under surveillance.

In 1937 his book The Problem of the Distressed Areas was published by Victor Gollancz with a preface by Professor Harold Laski.

With the outbreak of war in 1939, Hannington started work at Swift Scales at Stonebridge in north-west London. He soon became chairman of the shop stewards’ committee, and led a successful one-week strike in the toolroom over wages. He was sacked in late 1940. According to historian Nina Fishman, this was as a result of pressure from the Ministry of Supply.

In 1942 Hannington was elected National Organiser of the Amalgamated Engineering Union (AEU). In 1950, he was defeated when standing for re-election to this post. In 1952, he was elected Assistant Divisional Organiser for Division 25, covering north London. He held this position from January 1953 until his retirement at age 65 in 1961.

=== Death and legacy ===
Wal Hannington died on 17 November 1966 at the age of 70.

== Publications by Wal Hannington ==
- The Insurgents in London: A Brief History of the Great National Hunger March of the Unemployed on London ... October 17th, 1922 ... until the End of February, 1923 ... under the Auspices of the National Unemployed Workers Committee Movement. n.c. [London]: n.p. [National Unemployed Workers' Committee Movement], n.d. [1923].
- What's Wrong in the Engineering Industry: Being an Analysis of the Present State of Industry and of the Unions, and an Answer to the Question: Can the Demands of the Unions Be Met?" Introduction by Harry Pollitt. London: National Minority Movement, n.d. [c. 1927].
- The March of the Miners: How We Smashed the Opposition. London: National Unemployed Workers' Committee Movement, 1927.
- Our March Against the Starvation Government. London: National Unemployed Workers' Committee Movement, 1928.
- The Story of the National Hunger March. London: National Unemployed Workers' Committee Movement, n.d. [1929].
- Our Case for the Unemployed Charter: Contains Also a Report on How the Labour Government Used Police Against Our Deputation. London: National Unemployed Workers' Movement, n.d. [1929].
- How to Get Unemployment Benefit: A Practical Guide for Unemployed Workers. With E. Lewellyn. London: National Unemployed Workers' Committee Movement, n.d. [c. 1930].
- Crimes Against the Unemployed: An Exposure of the TUC Scab Scheme and the Crimes Committed Against the Unemployed by the TUC General Council. London: National Unemployed Workers' Movement, n.d. [c. 1933].
- The New Unemployment Bill: What it Means. London: National Unemployed Workers' Movement, n.d. [c. 1933].
- An Exposure of the Unemployed Social Service Schemes. London: National Unemployed Workers' Movement, n.d. [1934].
- Work for Wages, Not Slave Camps: Positive Proposals for Reducing Unemployment. London: National Unemployed Workers' Movement, n.d. [c. 1934].
- Unemployed Struggles, 1919–1936: My Life and Struggles Amongst the Unemployed. London: Lawrence and Wishart, n.d. [1936].
- The Problem of Distressed Areas. London: Victor Gollancz, 1937.
- A Short History of the Unemployed. London: Victor Gollancz, 1938.
- Fascist Danger and the Unemployed. London: National Unemployed Workers' Movement, 1939.
- Black Coffins and the Unemployed. London: Fact, 1939.
- Ten Lean Years: An Examination of the Record of the National Government in the Field of Unemployment. London: Victor Gollancz, 1940.
- Industrial History in Wartime: Including a Record of the Shop Stewards' Movement. London: Lawrence and Wishart, 1941.
- The Rights of Engineers. London: Victor Gollancz, 1944.
- Tom Mann 1856–1941: A Short Biography. Coventry: Coventry Tom Mann Memorial Trades and Labour Hall Fund Committee, n.d. [c. 1947].
- The New Hungary as We Saw It. With Jim Gardner. London: Hungarian News and Information Service, 1949.
- Mr. Chairman! A Short Guide to the Conduct and Procedure of Meetings. London: Lawrence and Wishart, 1950.
- Never On Our Knees. London: Lawrence and Wishart, 1967.
