= James Glanville =

James Edward Glanville (1891 – 18 September 1958) was a Labour Party politician in the United Kingdom.

Glanville worked as a coal miner, and served on the executive of the Durham Miners' Association. He was elected unopposed as Member of Parliament (MP) for Consett in County Durham at a by-election in November 1943 following the death of the Labour MP David Adams. He held the seat until he retired from the House of Commons at the 1955 general election.

Parliament of the United Kingdom
Preceded by David Adams	Member of Parliament for Consett; 1943–1955	Succeeded by William Stones
