= Stephen Byers =

British Labour Party politician

The Right Honourable Stephen Byers
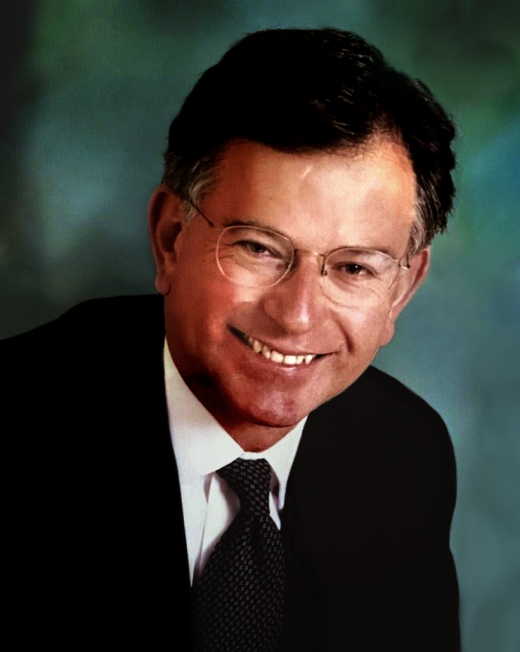
- Official portrait, c. 1998

Secretary of State for Transport, Local Government and the Regions
- In office 8 June 2001 – 29 May 2002
- Prime Minister: Tony Blair
- Preceded by: John Prescott (Environment, Transport and the Regions)
- Succeeded by: Alistair Darling (Transport)

Secretary of State for Trade and Industry President of the Board of Trade
- In office 23 December 1998 – 8 June 2001
- Prime Minister: Tony Blair
- Preceded by: Peter Mandelson
- Succeeded by: Patricia Hewitt

Chief Secretary to the Treasury
- In office 27 July 1998 – 23 December 1998
- Prime Minister: Tony Blair
- Chancellor: Gordon Brown
- Preceded by: Alistair Darling
- Succeeded by: Alan Milburn

Minister of State for Schools
- In office 2 May 1997 – 27 July 1998
- Prime Minister: Tony Blair
- Preceded by: Eric Forth
- Succeeded by: Estelle Morris

Member of Parliament for North Tyneside Wallsend (1992–1997)
- In office 9 April 1992 – 12 April 2010
- Preceded by: Ted Garrett
- Succeeded by: Mary Glindon

North Tyneside Councillor for Howdon ward
- In office 1 May 1980 – 10 April 1992
- Preceded by: J. Wylie
- Succeeded by: T. Cruikshanks

Personal details
- Born: Stephen John Byers; 13 April 1953 (age 73) Wolverhampton, Staffordshire, United Kingdom
- Party: Labour
- Education: Liverpool John Moores University

Stephen John Byers (born 13 April 1953) is a British Labour Party politician who was the Member of Parliament (MP) for Wallsend between 1992 and 1997, and North Tyneside from 1997 to 2010. He served in the Cabinet from 1998 to 2002, and was implicated in the MP expenses scandal and retired from politics in 2010.

During Byers' ministerial career, he was Chief Secretary to the Treasury, Secretary of State for Trade and Industry, and Secretary of State for Transport, Local Government and the Regions in the Cabinet.

== Early career ==
Stephen Byers was born in Wolverhampton. He was educated at Wymondham College, a co-educational boarding school in Norfolk, Chester City Grammar School and the Chester College of Further Education. He then gained a law degree at Liverpool John Moores University and became a law lecturer at Newcastle Polytechnic (now Northumbria University) in 1977, a post he retained until his election as a Member of Parliament in 1992.

Byers was elected as a councillor to the North Tyneside District Council in 1980 and was its deputy leader from 1985 until he became an MP in 1992. Reportedly a former supporter of the entryist Militant group once active within the Labour Party – a claim which he says is untrue – Byers had publicly rejected the group's approach by 1986. In the 1983 general election, he contested the Conservative stronghold seat of Hexham, finishing in third place and some 14,000 votes behind the former Cabinet minister Geoffrey Rippon. He was first elected to Parliament in the 1992 general election in Wallsend, a Labour stronghold, following the retirement of Ted Garrett, and secured a majority of 19,470.

In 1993, Byers joined the influential Home Affairs Select committee. He became an ally of Tony Blair, a fellow northeastern Labour MP, who was also in favour of 'modernising' the Labour Party. Blair gave him a job as soon as he became the Leader of the Opposition, placing Byers in the Whips' Office. He became a spokesman for the Department for Education and Employment in 1995, and he identified himself as an "outrider" for the New Labour project, regularly floating radical ideas on Blair's behalf to test reaction. An instance of this is when Byers briefed journalists in 1996 saying that the party might sever its links with the trade unions. Byers was swiftly appointed to shadow portfolios and became the Minister for School Standards with the title of Minister of State at the Department of Education and Employment following the victorious 1997 general election. While in this post, Byers drew attention to himself in a BBC interview promoting a Government numeracy drive, when he mistakenly said 8 times 7 was 54.

His Wallsend constituency was abolished in 1997, and he was elected for the equally safe North Tyneside constituency with a 26,643-vote majority.

== Cabinet appointment ==
He joined the Cabinet in July 1998, as Chief Secretary to the Treasury and became a Member of the Privy Council. Following the sudden resignation of Peter Mandelson, Byers was appointed as Secretary of State for Trade and Industry in December 1998. After the 2001 general election, he was made Secretary of State for Transport, Local Government & the Regions.

=== MG Rover ===
Byers was heavily criticised for his part in the collapse of MG Rover Group. Byers, as Secretary of State for Trade and Industry, advocated the 2000 deal with the Phoenix Consortium instead of the bid from Alchemy Partners, a successful turnaround private equity investor that would have slimmed down the business. Although this deal prolonged the existence of the group by five years, it ultimately collapsed at extensive cost to the British tax payers while giving large profits from a dowry given by the seller BMW to the Phoenix Consortium. Byers responded to this criticism in his submission to the Trade and Industry committee, stating that his actions had largely been in line with government policy and that the long slow collapse of MG Rover Group had been preferable to a short sudden collapse.

=== Railtrack ===
The first source of controversy in the Railtrack incident was the decision, taken at short notice with disregard for the regulator Tom Winsor, and implemented over a weekend, to ask the High Court to put the privatised railway infrastructure company Railtrack into railway administration, on 7 October 2001. This ultimately led to the creation of Network Rail, which effectively renationalised Britain's railway infrastructure company. The British Office for National Statistics insisted that the placement of Network Rail in the private sector was correct. Byers later admitted that he had not been truthful.

Byers' decision angered those private investors who had lost money, and under pressure from The City, the government eventually had to offer compensation. The action also led to the largest class legal action ever seen in the British courts.

=== Exit from the Cabinet ===
In late 2001, it was revealed that Byers' political adviser, Jo Moore, had sent an email on 11 September 2001, suggesting that the September 11, 2001 attacks made it "a very good day to get out anything we want to bury". Moore and Byers survived the resulting outrage, but, in February 2002, the public uproar broke out again. A leaked email from the Department for Transport, Local Government and the Regions's head of news, Martin Sixsmith, a former BBC news reporter, seemed to warn Moore not to "bury" any more bad news on the day of Princess Margaret's funeral, implying that she was attempting to do so. On 15 February, the resignations of both Moore and Sixsmith were announced. Later on, however, Sixsmith stated that he had not agreed to go, but rather that Byers had insisted on the head of news' departure as his price to pay for losing Moore. In May it was confirmed by the Department that Byers had announced Sixsmith's resignation prematurely, though the Government said that this was due to a misunderstanding, and he had done nothing wrong.

Byers' troubles continued over the following months. The Labour-dominated House of Commons Transport Select Committee criticised the party's transport strategy, and a long-running row over Byers' decision as Trade Secretary to allow pornographic-magazine publisher Richard Desmond to buy the Daily Express newspaper returned to the limelight. The pressure on Byers was too much; he resigned on 28 May 2002, and was replaced by Alistair Darling.

== Return to backbenches ==
On the backbenches, Byers kept up pressure for the Labour Party to keep to the centre ground. In August 2006, he suggested that Labour heir-apparent, Gordon Brown, should discard the inheritance tax to prove his "New Labour" credentials to Middle England. This suggestion was widely criticised by many MPs, who claimed that the publicity surrounding Byers' plan would "frighten constituents in the high-priced south into believing they would have to pay death duties, when most won't".

On 14 November 2009, he announced that he would be stepping down from Parliament at the 2010 general election.

Following the criticism of the Prime Minister over the budget of 2007, which dismissed the ten per cent starting rate of income tax as well as that of 2008, which included a planned two per cent rise in fuel duties, Byers accused Gordon Brown of manipulating the tax system for "tactical advantage" and urged an "immediate halt" to proposals to increase taxes on motorists. He also condemned the government's proposed inheritance tax reforms that had been launched in response to Opposition proposals to reform the tax. He went on to urge the government to carry out a fundamental rethinking of tax policy.

== Expenses ==
As part of a series of reports highlighting MPs' expenses claims, on 10 May 2009, The Sunday Telegraph reported that Byers had claimed more than £125,000 in second home allowances for a London flat owned by his partner, where the MP lived rent-free. Allegedly included in his expenses claims was £27,000 for redecoration, maintenance, and appliances for the property.

== Lobbyist investigation ==
In March 2010, Byers was among the politicians caught out by undercover journalists who were posing as lobbyists from an international company. The journalists were from The Sunday Times and filming for the Channel 4 investigatory series Dispatches. He was shown describing himself as a "cab for hire" and offering to lobby his parliamentary contacts in support of the fictitious company for a financial payment of between £3,000 and £5,000 per day. Byers claimed to have influenced outcomes for National Express and Tesco through his relationships with Lord Adonis, Transport Secretary, and Peter Mandelson, Business Secretary, respectively. He claimed that he phoned Mandelson to put a stop to "massively bureaucratic" food labelling regulations after he had been contacted by Tesco. He later withdrew his name for consideration by the fictitious lobbying company via email, claiming he had over-stated his role, writing, "I have not spoken to Andrew Adonis or Peter Mandelson about the matters I mentioned". When the story broke, National Express and Tesco also denied there was any truth in Byers' statements. Byers referred himself to John Lyon, the Parliamentary Commissioner for Standards. Byers expressed confidence that Lyon would clear his name, but he was eventually banned from the parliamentary estate. On 22 March 2010, Byers' administrative suspension from the membership of the Parliamentary Labour Party was announced alongside those of Patricia Hewitt, Geoff Hoon and Margaret Moran. However, all four remained members of the Labour Party itself.

On 9 December 2010, Geoff Hoon along with Stephen Byers and Richard Caborn were banned from parliament, the Standards and Privileges Committee banned Geoff Hoon for a minimum five years, for his was the most serious breach, whilst Byers received two years and Caborn six months.

== See also ==
- List of people from Wolverhampton

== Footnotes ==
Parliament of the United Kingdom
Preceded by Ted Garrett	Member of Parliament for Wallsend; 1992–1997	Constituency abolished
New constituency	Member of Parliament for North Tyneside; 1997–2010	Succeeded by Mary Glindon
Political offices
Preceded by Alistair Darling	Chief Secretary to the Treasury; 1998	Succeeded by Alan Milburn
Preceded by Peter Mandelson	Secretary of State for Trade and Industry; 1998–2001	Succeeded by Patricia Hewitt
Preceded by John Prescott as Secretary of State for Environment, Transport and the Regions	Secretary of State for Transport, Local Government and the Regions; 2001–2002	Succeeded by Alistair Darling as Secretary of State for Transport
Preceded by John Prescott as Secretary of State for Environment, Transport and the Regions	Secretary of State for Transport, Local Government and the Regions; 2001–2002	Succeeded by John Prescott as Deputy Prime Minister
