= Benjamin Gardner =

British trade unionist

Benjamin Gardner (24 October 1896 – 6 April 1956) was a British trade unionist.

Born in Salford, Gardner worked making scientific instruments and became active in the Scientific Instrument Makers' Trade Society. He served with the Royal Flying Corps during World War I, then worked at Vickers, where he became shop steward for the Amalgamated Engineering Union (AEU), and was also active on the Manchester and Salford Trades Council.

In 1934, Gardner was elected as assistant general secretary of the AEU, then in 1943 he became general secretary. In this role, he was a close ally of Jack Tanner and used his influence to oppose the left wing of the union movement. He was also active in the Trades Union Congress, chairing the General Purposes Committee from 1948. He died suddenly in 1956.

Trade union offices
| Preceded by Fred A. Smith | Assistant General Secretary of the Amalgamated Engineering Union; 1934–1943 | Succeeded by R. Gardner |
| Preceded by Fred A. Smith | General Secretary of the Amalgamated Engineering Union; 1943–1956 | Succeeded by Cecil Hallett |
