= Ernie Roberts =

British politician (1912–1994)

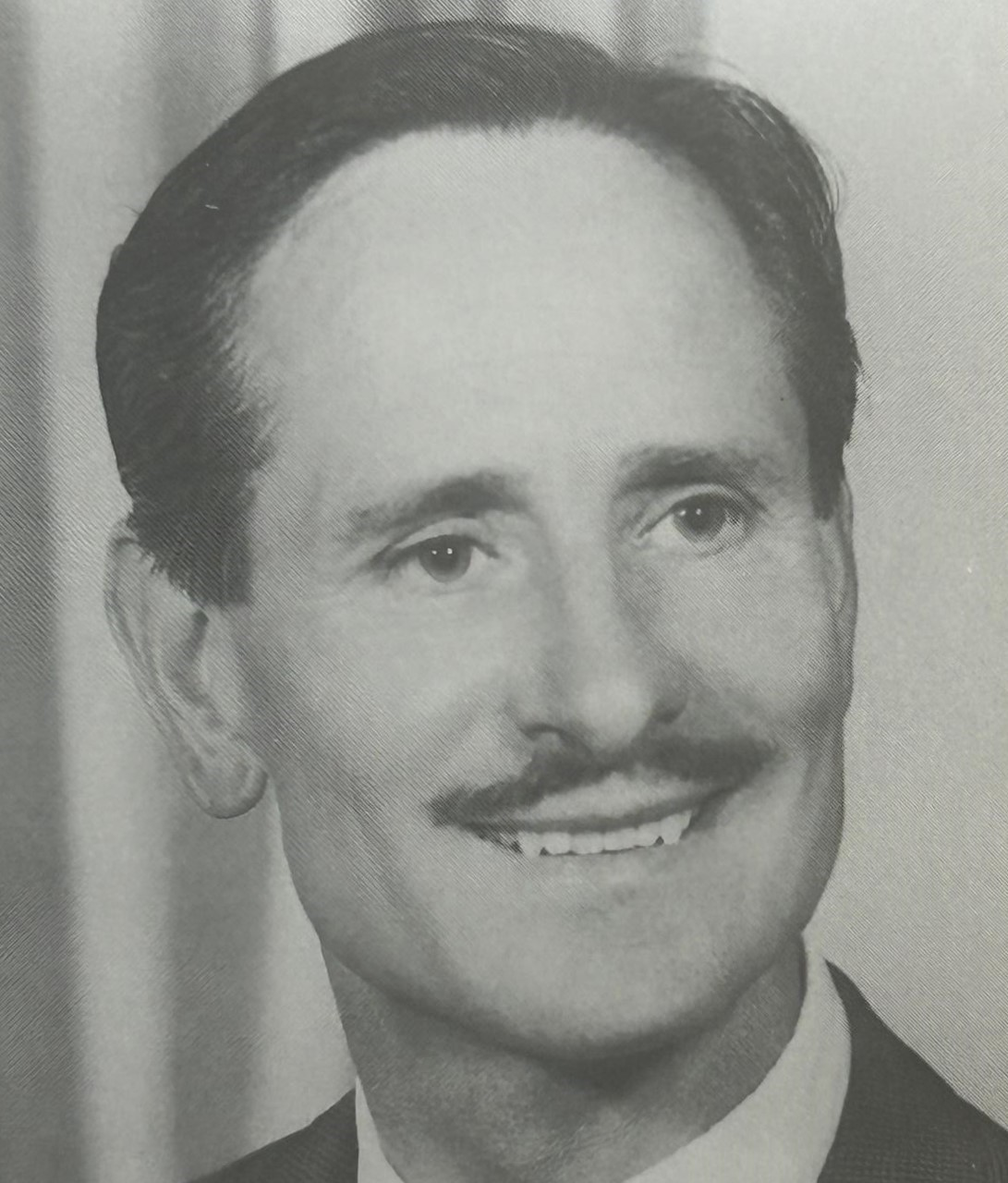
- Ernie Roberts, 1957

Member of Parliament for Hackney North and Stoke Newington
- In office 1979–1987
- Preceded by: David Weitzman
- Succeeded by: Diane Abbott

Personal details
- Born: 20 April 1912
- Died: 28 August 1994 (aged 82)
- Party: Labour
- Spouse: Joyce Longley (m. 1953)
- Children: 3

Ernest Alfred Cecil Roberts (20 April 1912 – 28 August 1994) was a British Labour Party politician. He was Assistant General Secretary of the Amalgamated Union of Engineering Workers, was a co-founder of the Anti-Nazi League in 1977, and was the MP for Hackney North and Stoke Newington from 1979 to 1987.

== Early life ==
Roberts was born in Shrewsbury in 1912. He left school at the age of thirteen, having declined a scholarship to the Shrewsbury School of Art, to work in a coal mine to help support ultimately ten siblings.

== Trade union and political career ==
Roberts worked as an engineering worker for many years, much blacklisted and dismissed for trade union activities, until he was elected Assistant General Secretary of the Amalgamated Union of Engineering Workers in 1957. Ideologically, he was on the left wing of the Labour Party.

Roberts was a member of the Communist Party of Great Britain between 1934 and 1943. He was expelled from the CP in 1941, his main political difference being that 'the Party took the line that while the war against fascism continued, the class struggle should be in abeyance'. In 1942 Roberts joined the Labour Party, of which he remained an active member for the rest of his life.

In 1944 Roberts was elected to the senior lay position of District President of Coventry Amalgamated Engineering Union. Roberts wrote, 'Thus I became the youngest ever District President in the union, at the age of 32, with responsibilities ranging over a wide area throughout the Midlands, and covering 25,000 members'. He was then re-elected to this position annually, but was finally defeated when standing for re-election in 1948.

Roberts was a Labour member of Coventry City Council between 1949 and 1958, playing a leading role in a range of council committees.

After unsuccessfully contesting Stockport South in 1955 general election, Roberts was elected as the Member of Parliament for the Inner London constituency of Hackney North and Stoke Newington aged 67, according to his obituary writer Frank Allaun the oldest new MP since the Second World War, (although John McQuade who also took his only Westminster seat at the same election was eight months older than Roberts). He served from the 1979 general election until the 1987 general election, when he was deselected in favour of Diane Abbott who would go on to become the first-ever Black British female MP. He was defeated by Abbott in the second round of votes 42 to 35.

== Personal life ==
Roberts was described in 1972 as 'Small and dapper... in his fashionable grey suit and mauve shirt he could have walked straight off the pages of a colour supplement. He looks younger than his years...'

Roberts married Joyce Longley in 1953, and had a son and two daughters, all of whom survived him following his death on 28 August 1994 at the age of 82.

== Books by Ernie Roberts ==
- Workers' Control (Allen & Unwin 1973)
  - 労働者支配制 (Workers' Control Japanese edition) (1975)
- Unemployment – The Facts (Part-author) (Spokesman Books)
- Humanising the Work-place (Part-author) (Crook & Helm)
- The solution is Workers Control (pamphlet) (Spokesman Books)
- Democracy in the Engineering Union (Part-author, with Edmund Frow and Ruth Frow) (Institute for Workers' Control 1982)
- Strike Back (Autobiography, with forewords by Tony Benn and Arthur Scargill) (posthumously published 1994)

Trade union offices
Preceded by Cecil Hallett	Assistant General Secretary of the Amalgamated Engineering Union; 1957–1977	Succeeded by Bob Wright
Parliament of the United Kingdom
Preceded by David Weitzman	Hackney North and Stoke Newington; 1979–1987	Succeeded by Diane Abbott
