= Cecil Hallett =

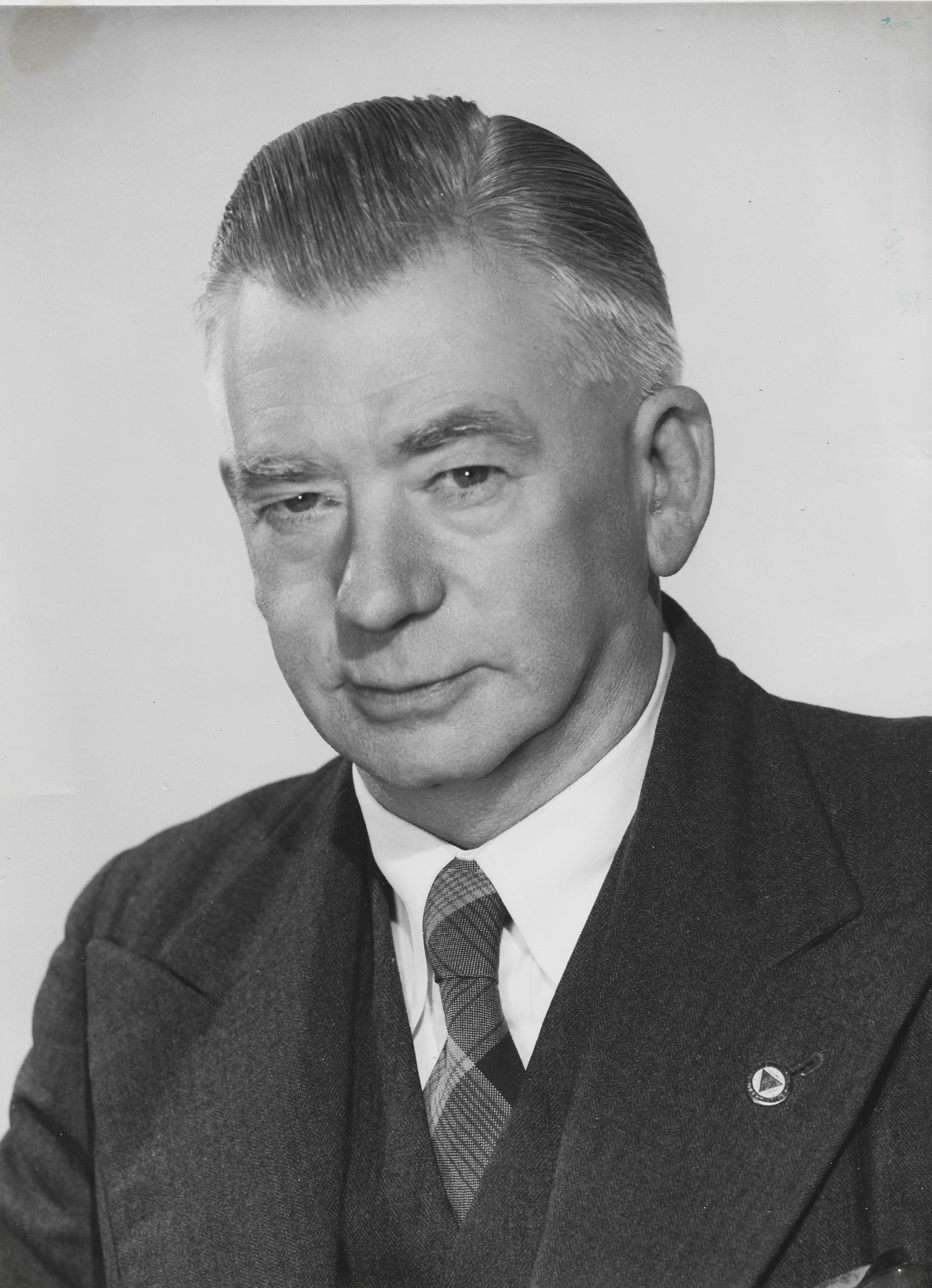
A picture of Cecil Hallett. Obtained from his daughter.

Cecil Walter Hallett (10 December 1899 – 5 December 1994) was a British trade unionist.

Born in London, Hallett left school aged fourteen. He worked as a messenger before securing an apprenticeship as a fitter and turner in Beckton. In 1918, he enlisted in the 10th London Regiment, but with World War I about to finish, he was discharged the following year. He returned to employment as a fitter and turner, and became active in the Amalgamated Engineering Union (AEU). In 1948, he was elected as the union's assistant general secretary, then in 1957 as its general secretary, serving until his retirement in 1964.

In his spare time, Hallett enjoyed long-distance running and race walking, and represented Essex in both events.

Trade union offices
| Preceded by A. J. Caddick | Assistant General Secretary of the Amalgamated Engineering Union; 1948–1957 | Succeeded by Ernie Roberts |
| Preceded by Benjamin Gardner | General Secretary of the Amalgamated Engineering Union; 1957–1964 | Succeeded by Jim Conway |
