= Amalgamated Society of Vehicle Builders, Carpenters and Mechanics =

Trade union representing railway carriage builders

The Amalgamated Society of Vehicle Builders, Carpenters and Mechanics was a trade union representing workers in building railway carriages in the United Kingdom.

The union was founded in 1873, as the Amalgamated Society of Railway Wagon and Carriage Makers, Wheelwrights, Carpenters and Mechanics, based in Wigan. By 1892, it had only 195 members, but this grew steadily, reaching 823 in 1910. In 1914, the National Amalgamated Society of Railway Wagon and Carriage Builders and Lifters merged in, and it adopted its final name.

By 1921, the union claimed 10,000 members, although this then began to fall, and by 1945, was down to 5,783. That year, it merged into the Amalgamated Engineering Union.

== General Secretaries ==
E. Buckley
J. Lancaster
c.1919: J. H. Roberts
1923: D. G. Wilkie
