= David Watkins (British politician) =

British politician (1925–2013)

David John Watkins (27 August 1925 – 23 August 2013) was a British Labour Party politician.

Watkins was educated at South Central and Merrywood Grammar Schools, Bristol, and Bristol College of Technology. He was an engineering inspector and president of his branch of the Amalgamated Engineering Union. He served as a councillor on Bristol City Council 1954-57 and on the Bristol Education Committee from 1958.

Watkins contested Bristol North West in 1964. He was the Member of Parliament (MP) for Consett from 1966 to 1983, when the seat was abolished in boundary changes.

Watkins was director of the Council for Arab-British Understanding from 1983 to 1990. His books on the Palestine-Israel conflict include Palestine: an inescapable duty and The Exceptional Conflict.

He died on 23 August 2013 at the age of 87 from complications of a stroke suffered in December 2012.

== Bibliography ==
- The exceptional conflict: British political parties and the Arab-Israeli confrontation, CAABU 1984, ISBN 0-947918-00-0
- Palestine: An Inescapable Duty, Alhani International Books 1992, ISBN 978-1-873765-06-7
- Seventeen Years in Obscurity: Memoirs from the Back Benches, Book Guild 1996, ISBN 978-1-85776-120-7
- Class and Consequence, Book Guild 2007, ISBN 978-1-84624-053-9

Parliament of the United Kingdom
Preceded by William Stones	Member of Parliament for Consett; 1966–1983	Constituency abolished
