= Amalgamated Association of Brass Turners, Fitters, Finishers and Coppersmiths =

UK trade union

The Amalgamated Association of Brass Turners, Fitters, Finishers and Coppersmiths was a trade union representing brassfounders and people in related trades in the United Kingdom.

The union was founded in 1912 with the merger of ten local unions. These were based in Aberdeen, Belfast, Bury, Derby and Burton, Dundee, Greenock and Port Glasgow, Glasgow, Manchester, Nottingham, and Oldham. Together, they brought 2,600 members into the new union.

The Amalgamated Society of Engineers (ASE) put out a call for other unions to amalgamated with it, and the Brass Turners was one of seventeen unions which balloted its members on the proposal. The vote was passed, and in 1920 it merged with the ASE and eight other unions to form the Amalgamated Engineering Union.
