= Albert Smethurst =

British trade unionist (1868–1935)

Albert Harry Smethurst (19 August 1868 – 11 November 1935) was a British trade unionist. Born in Oldham, Smethurst completed an apprenticeship as an engineer and became active in the Amalgamated Society of Engineers (ASE), soon becoming its Oldham district secretary. He was also elected as secretary of the Oldham Trades Council. In 1913, Smethurst was elected as assistant general secretary of the ASE. In 1920, the ASE merged with several other unions to become the Amalgamated Engineering Union (AEU), and he became its general secretary in 1921, serving until his retirement in 1933.

Trade union offices
Preceded by Robert Young	Assistant General Secretary of the Amalgamated Engineering Union; 1913–1921	Succeeded by Fred A. Smith
Preceded by Tom Mann	General Secretary of the Amalgamated Engineering Union; 1921–1933	Succeeded by Fred A. Smith
