= 1943 Consett by-election =

UK by-election

The 1943 Consett by-election was a parliamentary by-election held for the British House of Commons constituency of Consett on 15 November 1943.

The seat had become vacant when the Labour Member of Parliament David Adams had died on 16 August 1943, aged 72. He had held the seat since the 1935 general election.

During World War II, the parties in the war-time coalition government had agreed not to contest by-elections where a seat held by any of their parties fell vacant, so the Labour candidate, James Glanville was returned unopposed. He represented the constituency until he retired from the House of Commons at the 1955 general election.

== See also ==
- Consett
- List of United Kingdom by-elections (1931–1950)
