= Amalgamated Instrument Makers' Society =

British trade union

- Merged into: Amalgamated Engineering Union
- Founded: 1887
- Dissolved: 1920
- Headquarters: 41 Cowcross Street, London
- Location: United Kingdom
- Members: 2,400 (1914)
- Key people: J. W. Clark (Gen Sec)
- Affiliations: TUC

The Amalgamated Instrument Makers' Society was a trade union representing workers involved in manufacturing scientific instruments in the United Kingdom.

The union was founded in 1887 as the Scientific Instrument Makers' Trade Society. In 1891, it was a founder member of the Federation of Engineering and Shipbuilding Trades.

Initially a very small union, it had only 664 members in 1900, but then began growing, reaching 2,400 members by 1914.

The Amalgamated Society of Engineers (ASE) put out a call for other unions to amalgamated with it, and the Instrument Makers was one of seventeen unions which balloted its members on the proposal. The vote was passed, and in 1920 it merged with the ASE and eight other unions to form the Amalgamated Engineering Union.
