= United Operative Spindle and Flyer Makers' Trade and Friendly Society =

Former trade union of the United Kingdom

The United Operative Spindle and Flyer Makers' Trade and Friendly Society was a trade union representing workers involved in making textile machinery in the United Kingdom.

The union was founded in 1856. In 1860, it applied to merge into the Amalgamated Society of Engineers (ASE), but it was rejected, as the ASE believed that its members were insufficiently highly skilled. The union continued independently, and by 1900 it reached its peak membership, of about 1,300 members.

From a newspaper clipping: "The death of Mr James Agnew (7 January 1956), of 12 Dunn Street, Belfast, has also caused the death of a trade union in Ireland. For 85 year old Mr Agnew was the last surviving member in Ireland of the United Operative Spindle and Flyer Makers' Trade and Friendly Society. The Society at one time had hundreds of members all over Ireland. For many years Mr Agnew was regarded by the Society as being the Belfast branch for all official purposes, although he was retired. The annual report and balance sheet of the Society for 1954 show that in the Belfast branch - the only Irish one - contributions amounted to 4s. Remittances also amounted to 4s. The Society as still many members in Great Britain."

The rival Operative Mule and Ring Spindle Makers' Society is suspected by Arthur Marsh and Victoria Ryan of having merged into the Spindle and Flyer Makers at some point after 1925. Despite this, its membership continued to fall, dropping to only 600 by the late 1940s, and under 200 in 1962. That year, it finally merged into the successor of the ASE, the Amalgamated Engineering Union.
