= John Hughes (Coventry North East MP) =

John Hughes (29 May 1925 – 14 August 2009) was Labour Member of Parliament (MP) for Coventry North East in the United Kingdom from 1987 to 1992.

Born in Tanfield Lea, County Durham, he served in the Royal Navy aboard HMS Victorious during the Second World War. A former Durham and Keresley miner, storeman and transport union convener, in 1986 he successfully fought and received compensation following a claim of unfair dismissal as a result of his union activities from Austin-Rover's Unipart works in Coventry.

Mr Hughes served as a Coventry City councillor for the Holbrook Ward, and chair of the Coventry District Labour Party from 1977 to 1981. In his time on the Council, he was expelled three times from the ruling Labour group for defying the party whip over spending cuts, rent rises and school meal price rises.

He was MP for Coventry North East at a time when his Constituency Labour Party was the scene of particularly fraught left-right battles, even by the standards of the Labour Party in the 1980s. In 1985, the left wing won control of the CLP at the AGM. Hughes had not been particularly prominent in the period leading up to this, but he came out of political semi-retirement as an "elder statesman" figure to become CLP chair. A few weeks later the sitting MP, George Park, announced his intention to retire at the next election, if he had not done so there would probably have been an attempt to deselect him. The CLP then went into the procedure for selecting a parliamentary candidate. At the selection meeting the right wing voted for Hughes as he seemed the weakest of the left-wing candidates, mainly because he was aged 60 and so might only serve one term as an MP.

Hughes was elected at the 1987 general election at the age of 62, old for a first-time MP but by no means unknown. In his time as an MP he hit the headlines when, on Monday 11 January 1988, the Speaker ordered him out of the chamber, when during prayers he asked the clergyman not to bless the house in protest at the social impact of the government's policies. The focus of this protest was the case of Matthew Mulhall, a constituent of Hughes, whose condition required a life-saving operation by the end of February, 1988. The local hospital had repeatedly delayed the treatment that could save Matthew's life. Hughes, himself a practising Catholic, subsequently escaped punishment for his outburst by the Labour leadership. Then-Labour Chief Whip, Derek Foster went on to endorse the protest by Mr Hughes as "utterly sincere." Hughes also attempted to have the law changed, preventing gas and electricity companies from cutting-off supplies of essential fuel and energy to individual homes. His Fuel and Energy Provision Bill was given its first reading on Wednesday, 27 July 1988, but progressed no further due to lack of time.

In the run up to the 1992 general election his Constituency Labour Party had shifted to the right, and it deselected him in favour of Bob Ainsworth. He fought the election as Independent Labour, polling 4,008 votes (8.5% of total votes cast).

Parliament of the United Kingdom
Preceded by George Park	Member of Parliament for Coventry North East; 1987 – 1992	Succeeded by Bob Ainsworth
