= William Stones =

William Stones Member of Parliament for Consett
- Born: October 2, 1904
- Died: July 2, 1969 (aged 64)
- Occupation: Mine inspector
- Organization: National Union of Mineworkers
- Title: Member of Parliament
- Term: 1955–1966
- Predecessor: James Glanville
- Successor: David Watkins
- Political party: Labour
- Movement: Social democracy

William Stones (2 October 1904 – 2 July 1969) was a Labour Party politician in the United Kingdom.

== Biography ==
Stones was a member of the National Union of Mineworkers and worked as a mine inspector. At the 1955 general election, he was elected as Member of Parliament for Consett in County Durham. He held the seat until he retired from the House of Commons at the 1966 general election.

Stones' name is attached to a celebrated Parliamentary anecdote. On being challenged that he was a "bleeding idiot", he is said to have responded "There's an awful lot of bleeding idiots out there among the voters, and they deserve some representation too."

== Sources ==
- Leigh Rayment's Historical List of MPs
- Oakley, Robin (4 July 1998). "Friendly Folkestone". The Spectator.

Parliament of the United Kingdom
Preceded by James Edward Glanville	Member of Parliament for Consett; 1955 – 1966	Succeeded by David Watkins
