= Matt Simm =

Matthew Turnbull Simm (4 January 1869 – 8 October 1928) was a National Democratic and Labour Party Member of Parliament (MP) representing Wallsend, from 1918 to 1922.

At the 1922 general election he stood for re-election as a candidate of the National Liberals but came fourth as the seat was won by Patrick Hastings of the Labour Party.

Parliament of the United Kingdom
New constituency	Member of Parliament for Wallsend; 1918–1922	Succeeded by Patrick Hastings
