= Wallsend (constituency) =

Parliamentary constituency in the United Kingdom, 1918–1997

Coordinates: 54.991°N 1.533°W

- Former borough constituency for the House of Commons
- County: 1918–1974: Northumberland; 1974–1997: Tyne and Wear

1918–1997
- Seats: One
- Created from: Tyneside
- Replaced by: Newcastle upon Tyne East & Wallsend and North Tyneside

Wallsend was a parliamentary constituency centred on Wallsend, a town on the north bank of the River Tyne in North Tyneside.

It returned one Member of Parliament (MP) to the House of Commons of the Parliament of the United Kingdom from 1918 to 1997.

== History ==
Wallsend was created as a parliamentary borough constituency under the Representation of the People Act 1918 and was formed from the majority of the abolished Northumberland county division of Tyneside.

It was abolished for the 1997 general election when the majority of the constituency formed the new seat of North Tyneside, but the town of Wallsend itself (the Wallsend and Northumberland wards) was added to Newcastle upon Tyne East to form Newcastle upon Tyne East and Wallsend. Although this was reversed at the next periodic review of constituencies for the 2010 general election, the former constituency name was not re-established, so Wallsend is now included in the North Tyneside constituency.

After middle-class Gosforth was moved out of the seat in the 1983 boundary changes, the constituency had the country's highest percentage of working-class voters at 84% of the electorate.

== Boundaries ==
=== 1918–1950 ===
- the Municipal Borough of Wallsend; and
- the Urban Districts of Gosforth, Longbenton, and Weetslade.

=== 1950–1983 ===
- the Municipal Borough of Wallsend; and
- the Urban Districts of Gosforth and Longbenton.

Weetslade UD had been absorbed by Longbenton UD in 1935, but the constituency boundaries remained largely unchanged.

=== 1983–1997 ===
- the Metropolitan Borough of North Tyneside wards of Battle Hill, Benton, Camperdown, Holystone, Howdon, Longbenton, Northumberland, Valley, Wallsend, and Weetslade.

As a result of the reorganisation of local authorities resulting from the Local Government Act 1972, the area comprising the former Urban District of Gosforth was now part of the City of Newcastle upon Tyne and consequently included in the constituencies of Newcastle upon Tyne Central and Newcastle upon Tyne North. The constituency gained the communities of Backworth and Earsdon which had previously been part of the seat of Blyth. Other minor boundary changes in line with changes to local authority and ward boundaries.

== Members of Parliament ==
| Election | Member | Party |
|---|---|---|
| 1918 | Matt Simm | National Democratic |
| 1922 | Sir Patrick Hastings | Labour |
| 1926 by-election | Margaret Bondfield | Labour |
| 1931 | Irene Ward | Conservative |
| 1945 | John McKay | Labour |
| 1964 | Ted Garrett | Labour |
| 1992 | Stephen Byers | Labour |
| 1997 | constituency abolished | |

== Elections ==
=== Elections in the 1910s ===
Robertson

General election 1918: Wallsend
| Party | | Candidate | Votes | % | ±% |
|---|---|---|---|---|---|
| C | National Democratic | Matt Simm | 10,246 | 50.9 | |
| | Labour | John Chapman | 6,835 | 34.0 | |
| | Liberal | J. M. Robertson | 3,047 | 15.1 | |
| Majority | | | 3,411 | 16.9 | |
| Turnout | | | 20,128 | 54.8 | |
| Registered electors | | | 36,739 | | |
| | National Democratic win (new seat) | | | | |
C indicates candidate endorsed by the coalition government.

=== Elections in the 1920s ===
General election 1922: Wallsend
| Party | Candidate | Votes | % | ±% |
|---|---|---|---|---|
| Labour | Patrick Hastings | 14,248 | 46.8 | +12.8 |
| Unionist | Christopher Lowther | 11,425 | 37.6 | New |
| Liberal | Thomas George Graham | 2,908 | 9.6 | −5.5 |
| National Liberal | Matt Simm | 1,840 | 6.0 | New |
| Majority | | 2,823 | 9.2 | N/A |
| Turnout | | 30,421 | 82.2 | +27.4 |
| Registered electors | | 37,001 | | |
| Labour gain from National Democratic | | Swing | +28.9 | |

General election 1923: Wallsend
| Party | Candidate | Votes | % | ±% |
|---|---|---|---|---|
| Labour | Patrick Hastings | 16,126 | 55.5 | +8.7 |
| Unionist | Christopher Lowther | 12,950 | 44.5 | +6.9 |
| Majority | | 3,176 | 11.0 | +1.8 |
| Turnout | | 29,076 | 82.2 | 0.0 |
| Registered electors | | 38,435 | | |
| Labour hold | | Swing | +0.9 | |

General election 1924: Wallsend
| Party | Candidate | Votes | % | ±% |
|---|---|---|---|---|
| Labour | Patrick Hastings | 17,274 | 52.4 | −3.1 |
| Unionist | Sam Howard | 15,672 | 47.6 | +3.1 |
| Majority | | 1,602 | 4.8 | −6.2 |
| Turnout | | 32,946 | 85.4 | +9.8 |
| Registered electors | | 38,598 | | |
| Labour hold | | Swing | −3.1 | |

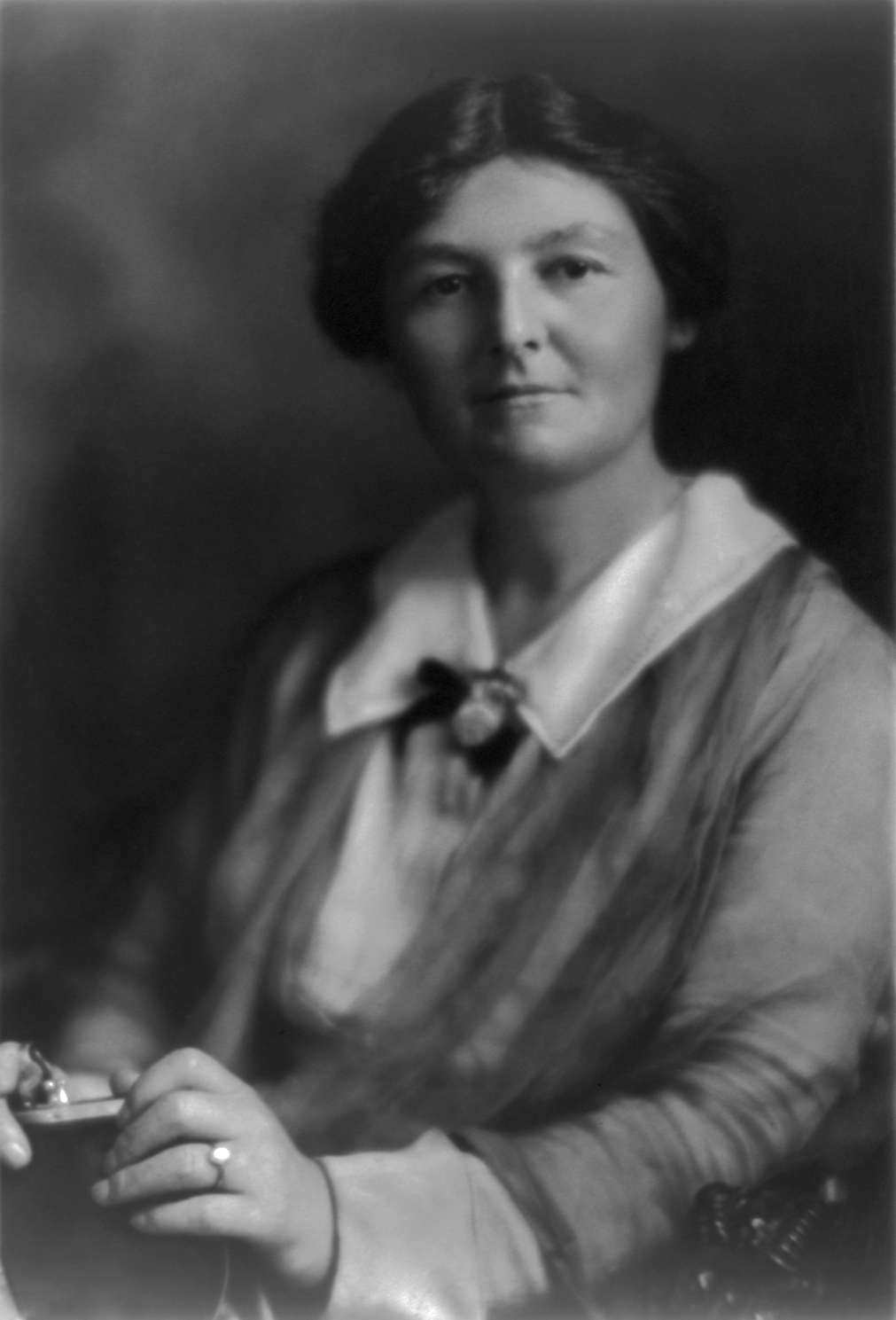
Margaret Bondfield

1926 Wallsend by-election
| Party | Candidate | Votes | % | ±% |
|---|---|---|---|---|
| Labour | Margaret Bondfield | 18,866 | 57.7 | +5.3 |
| Unionist | Sam Howard | 9,839 | 30.1 | −17.5 |
| Liberal | Aaron Curry | 4,000 | 12.2 | New |
| Majority | | 9,027 | 27.6 | +22.8 |
| Turnout | | 32,705 | 82.9 | −2.5 |
| Registered electors | | 39,460 | | |
| Labour hold | | Swing | +11.4 | |

General election 1929: Wallsend
| Party | Candidate | Votes | % | ±% |
|---|---|---|---|---|
| Labour | Margaret Bondfield | 20,057 | 49.5 | −2.9 |
| Unionist | Walter Waring | 12,952 | 31.9 | −15.7 |
| Liberal | Samuel Phillips | 6,790 | 16.7 | N/A |
| Communist | Wal Hannington | 744 | 1.8 | New |
| Majority | | 7,105 | 17.6 | +12.8 |
| Turnout | | 40,543 | 80.2 | −5.2 |
| Registered electors | | 50,578 | | |
| Labour hold | | Swing | +6.5 | |

=== Elections in the 1930s ===
General election 1931: Wallsend
| Party | Candidate | Votes | % | ±% |
|---|---|---|---|---|
| Conservative | Irene Ward | 25,999 | 58.57 | |
| Labour | Margaret Bondfield | 18,393 | 41.43 | |
| Majority | | 7,606 | 17.14 | N/A |
| Turnout | | 44,392 | 84.92 | |
| Conservative gain from Labour | | Swing | | |

General election 1935: Wallsend
| Party | Candidate | Votes | % | ±% |
|---|---|---|---|---|
| Conservative | Irene Ward | 23,842 | 52.62 | |
| Labour | Margaret Bondfield | 21,463 | 47.37 | |
| Majority | | 2,379 | 5.25 | |
| Turnout | | 45,304 | 81.26 | |
| Conservative hold | | Swing | | |

=== Election in the 1940s ===
General election 1945: Wallsend
| Party | Candidate | Votes | % | ±% |
|---|---|---|---|---|
| Labour | John McKay | 32,065 | 60.06 | |
| Conservative | Irene Ward | 21,319 | 39.94 | |
| Majority | | 10,746 | 20.12 | N/A |
| Turnout | | 53,384 | 78.86 | |
| Labour gain from Conservative | | Swing | | |

=== Elections in the 1950s ===
General election 1950: Wallsend
| Party | Candidate | Votes | % | ±% |
|---|---|---|---|---|
| Labour | John McKay | 33,790 | 56.35 | |
| Conservative | Dudley Fitz Mowbray Appleby | 21,643 | 36.09 | |
| Liberal | John William Craggs | 4,532 | 7.56 | New |
| Majority | | 12,147 | 20.26 | |
| Turnout | | 59,965 | 87.55 | |
| Labour hold | | Swing | | |

General election 1951: Wallsend
| Party | Candidate | Votes | % | ±% |
|---|---|---|---|---|
| Labour | John McKay | 35,678 | 58.70 | |
| Conservative | Gerald C. Crangle | 25,099 | 41.30 | |
| Majority | | 10,579 | 17.40 | |
| Turnout | | 60,777 | 87.18 | |
| Labour hold | | Swing | | |

General election 1955: Wallsend
| Party | Candidate | Votes | % | ±% |
|---|---|---|---|---|
| Labour | John McKay | 34,625 | 57.80 | |
| Conservative | Brian Baird | 25,275 | 42.20 | |
| Majority | | 9,350 | 15.60 | |
| Turnout | | 59,900 | 81.02 | |
| Labour hold | | Swing | | |

General election 1959: Wallsend
| Party | Candidate | Votes | % | ±% |
|---|---|---|---|---|
| Labour | John McKay | 37,862 | 56.55 | |
| Conservative | Brian Baird | 29,096 | 43.45 | |
| Majority | | 8,766 | 13.10 | |
| Turnout | | 66,958 | 83.45 | |
| Labour hold | | Swing | | |

=== Elections in the 1960s ===
General election 1964: Wallsend
| Party | Candidate | Votes | % | ±% |
|---|---|---|---|---|
| Labour | Ted Garrett | 39,841 | 60.42 | |
| Conservative | Brian Baird | 26,096 | 39.58 | |
| Majority | | 13,745 | 20.84 | |
| Turnout | | 65,937 | 81.54 | |
| Labour hold | | Swing | | |

General election 1966: Wallsend
| Party | Candidate | Votes | % | ±% |
|---|---|---|---|---|
| Labour | Ted Garrett | 39,744 | 65.21 | |
| Conservative | Peter Coles Price | 21,205 | 34.79 | |
| Majority | | 18,539 | 30.42 | |
| Turnout | | 60,949 | 77.48 | |
| Labour hold | | Swing | | |

=== Elections in the 1970s ===
General election 1970: Wallsend
| Party | Candidate | Votes | % | ±% |
|---|---|---|---|---|
| Labour | Ted Garrett | 39,065 | 61.31 | |
| Conservative | Earl M. White | 24,650 | 38.69 | |
| Majority | | 14,415 | 22.62 | |
| Turnout | | 63,715 | 74.18 | |
| Labour hold | | Swing | | |

General election February 1974: Wallsend
| Party | Candidate | Votes | % | ±% |
|---|---|---|---|---|
| Labour | Ted Garrett | 41,811 | 61.96 | |
| Conservative | J. Chambers | 24,564 | 36.40 | |
| Workers Revolutionary | D. Temple | 1,108 | 1.64 | New |
| Majority | | 17,247 | 25.56 | |
| Turnout | | 67,483 | 75.49 | |
| Labour hold | | Swing | | |

General election October 1974: Wallsend
| Party | Candidate | Votes | % | ±% |
|---|---|---|---|---|
| Labour | Ted Garrett | 37,180 | 58.11 | |
| Conservative | J. Chambers | 15,911 | 24.87 | |
| Liberal | P. Hampton | 10,453 | 16.34 | New |
| Workers Revolutionary | K. Flynn | 435 | 0.68 | |
| Majority | | 21,269 | 33.24 | |
| Turnout | | 63,979 | 70.85 | |
| Labour hold | | Swing | | |

General election 1979: Wallsend
| Party | Candidate | Votes | % | ±% |
|---|---|---|---|---|
| Labour | Ted Garrett | 38,214 | 55.14 | |
| Conservative | Liddell Johnston | 21,695 | 31.30 | |
| Liberal | P. Ryan | 8,514 | 12.28 | |
| National Front | Ian Hunter | 472 | 0.68 | New |
| Workers Revolutionary | K. Flynn | 412 | 0.59 | |
| Majority | | 16,519 | 23.84 | |
| Turnout | | 69,307 | 75.90 | |
| Labour hold | | Swing | | |

=== Elections in the 1980s ===
Joan Phylactou, twice SDP candidate, was a senior lecturer at Newcastle Polytechnic. 1983 Conservative candidate Mary Leigh was a solicitor and councillor for St Leonard's ward in Lambeth. 1987 Conservative candidate David Milburn was a salesman and trade unionist who had previously been a Labour member before joining the Conservatives in 1974; at the party's 1980 conference he had called for Keith Joseph to be sacked and Edward Heath brought into the cabinet, accusing the Thatcher government of murder over unemployment-linked suicides.

General election 1983: Wallsend
| Party | Candidate | Votes | % | ±% |
|---|---|---|---|---|
| Labour | Ted Garrett | 26,615 | 50.07 | |
| Conservative | Mary Leigh | 14,101 | 26.00 | |
| SDP | Joan Phylactou | 13,522 | 24.93 | |
| Majority | | 12,514 | 23.07 | |
| Turnout | | 54,238 | 71.12 | |
| Labour hold | | Swing | | |

General election 1987: Wallsend
| Party | Candidate | Votes | % | ±% |
|---|---|---|---|---|
| Labour | Ted Garrett | 32,709 | 56.84 | |
| Conservative | David Milburn | 13,325 | 23.16 | |
| SDP | Joan Phylactou | 11,508 | 20.00 | |
| Majority | | 19,384 | 33.68 | |
| Turnout | | 57,542 | 75.0 | |
| Labour hold | | Swing | | |

=== Elections in the 1990s ===
General election 1992: Wallsend
| Party | Candidate | Votes | % | ±% |
|---|---|---|---|---|
| Labour | Stephen Byers | 33,439 | 57.9 | +1.1 |
| Conservative | M Gibbon | 13,969 | 24.2 | +1.0 |
| Liberal Democrats | Michael J. Huscroft | 10,369 | 17.9 | −2.1 |
| Majority | | 19,470 | 33.7 | 0.0 |
| Turnout | | 57,777 | 74.1 | −0.9 |
| Labour hold | | Swing | 0.0 | |

== See also ==
- History of parliamentary constituencies and boundaries in Northumberland
- History of parliamentary constituencies and boundaries in Tyne and Wear
