= John Boyd (trade unionist) =

Scottish trade unionist

Sir John McFarlane Boyd CBE, OF (8 October 1917 – 30 April 1989) was a Scottish trade unionist.

Born in Motherwell, Boyd attended the Glencairn Secondary School before taking an engineering apprenticeship. He became active in the Amalgamated Engineering Union (AEU), working full-time as a union organiser from 1946., and joining the union's executive in 1953. He was also prominent in the Confederation of Shipbuilding and Engineering Unions, serving as its president in 1964, and was first elected to the General Council of the Trades Union Congress (TUC) in 1967. A member of the National Executive Committee of the Labour Party, he also served as the party's chairman in 1967.

Boyd stood for the presidency of the AEU in 1967, but he lost out to the left-winger Hugh Scanlon. In 1975, Boyd was elected as General Secretary of the AEU, serving until 1982. He was known as a right-winger in the union movement and for his loyalty to the Labour Party. From 1978 to 1982, he was also on the council of Acas; once retired from his trade union posts, he took up directorships of companies including ICL and the British Steel Corporation, and was a governor of the BBC.

Boyd was active in the Salvation Army from his childhood, and he received the Order of the Founder in 1981. He was made a Commander of the Order of the British Empire in 1974, and was knighted in 1979.

Party political offices
| Preceded by Walter Padley | Chair of the Labour Party; 1966–1967 | Succeeded by Jennie Lee |
Trade union offices
| Preceded by George Doughty | President of the Confederation of Shipbuilding and Engineering Unions; 1963–1964 | Succeeded by Ted Hill |
| Preceded by Jim Conway | General Secretary of the Engineering Section of the Amalgamated Union of Engineering Workers; 1975–1982 | Succeeded by Gavin Laird |
