= John McKay (English politician) =

British Labour politician

John McKay (2 May 1883 – 4 October 1964) was a British Labour politician who served as the Member of Parliament for Wallsend between 1945 and 1964.

McKay was born in Addison, near Blaydon, County Durham, the third child of Agnes (née O'Neil) and Peter McKay, a coalminer. His father was originally from Newry, County Armagh, Ireland, and his mother was originally from Stranraer, Wigtownshire, Scotland. He followed his father into the pits at the age of 12. At the age of 27 the Miner's Union sent him to Ruskin College, Oxford where he obtained, with distinction, a Diploma in Economics and Political Science. He then resumed his career in the coal mining industry as a Checkweighman.

McKay was elected as Member of Parliament for Wallsend at the 1945 general election, and was re-elected at four subsequent elections until his retirement prior to the 1964 general election, and he died 11 days before polling day. He was succeeded by Ted Garrett. He was made a Freeman of the Borough of Wallsend on 25 April 1963, an honour shared with Aneurin Bevan, who was granted it on 18 October 1952.

Parliament of the United Kingdom
Preceded by Irene Ward	Member of Parliament for Wallsend; 1945–1964	Succeeded by Ted Garrett
