= Fred A. Smith (trade unionist) =

Frederick Arthur Smith OBE (23 February 1887 – 23 January 1943) was a British trade unionist.

Born in Poplar, Smith completed an apprenticeship as an engineer and joined the London United Metal Turners Society. In 1917, he was elected as general secretary of the union, but in 1920 took it into a merger with the Amalgamated Society of Engineers which formed the Amalgamated Engineering Union (AEU). He became the AEU's first assistant general secretary, then in 1933 was elected as its general secretary. Smith was also prominent in the Trades Union Congress, and served as chair of its Standing Orders Committee for many years.

Smith was taken ill late in 1942 and had his leg amputated in hospital. While there, he heard that he had been made an Officer of the Order of the British Empire in the 1943 New Year Honours. By late January, he was ready to return home, but died suddenly while waiting for a lift.

Trade union offices
| Preceded by Albert Smethurst | Assistant General Secretary of the Amalgamated Engineering Union; 1921–1933 | Succeeded by Benjamin Gardner |
| Preceded by Albert Smethurst | General Secretary of the Amalgamated Engineering Union; 1933–1943 | Succeeded by Benjamin Gardner |
