= Jim Conway (trade unionist) =

British trade unionist (1915–1974)

James Conway (7 October 1915 – 3 March 1974) was a British trade unionist.

Conway grew up in the Manchester area, and left school at the age of fourteen to work at the Metropolitan-Vickers factory at Trafford Park. There, he joined the Amalgamated Engineering Union (AEU) and became a shop steward. He also joined the Communist Party of Great Britain (CPGB), but soon left to join the Labour Party, and subsequently became associated with the right wing of the labour movement. In 1949, he was elected to the AEU's Manchester Area Committee, and in 1952 as a Labour Party member of Manchester City Council, serving for eight years.

In 1959, Conway became national organiser of the AEU, then assistant general secretary in 1962, and in 1964 was elected as the union's general secretary. Under his leadership, the union merged with the Amalgamated Union of Foundry Workers, becoming the Amalgamated Union of Engineering and Foundry Workers, then with the Draughtsmen and Allied Technicians' Association and the Constructional Engineering Union, being renamed the Amalgamated Union of Engineering Workers.

In 1974, Conway was returning from Paris on Turkish Airlines Flight 981, when it crashed, resulting in the deaths of all on board.

Following Jim Conway's death, an educational and research trust, The Jim Conway Foundation (JCF), was established as a tribute to his work in the trade union movement. Andy Wood, Conway's Personal Assistant from 1966, founded the organisation. The JCF began by organising weekend seminars for rank and file trade unionists. Following a grant from the Manpower Services Commission's Job Creation Programme, the JCF was able to engage its first full-time staff; it established a research department and began to carry out independent research on employment related issues.

In the late 1970s, the JCF formed links with the Friedrich Ebert Stiftung, a large German organisation associated with the German Social Democratic Party, with which it worked closely on trade union and work related social issues for the rest of the twentieth century. In the 1990s, the JCF became involved with training programmes in Eastern Europe. The European Commission's Poland and Hungary Aid funded this involvement for the Regeneration of the Economies (PHARE) and Technical Assistance to CIS Countries (TACIS). The Foreign & Commonwealth Office also helped fund the European programme through its Know How Fund. Andy Wood retired in 1998 and the JCF ceased to exist two years later.

On 9 September 2024 Andy Wood launched the Jim Conway Foundation website as a memorial to Jim Conway and the work of the JCF. The site details the beginning of the organisation and includes more details on its involvement in education, training and research.

Trade union offices
Preceded by Cecil Hallett	General Secretary of the Amalgamated Engineering Union; 1964–1967	Succeeded by Position split
Preceded by New position	General Secretary of the Engineering Section of the Amalgamated Union of Engineering Workers; 1968–1974	Succeeded by John Boyd
