= Amalgamated Society of General Tool Makers, Engineers and Machinists =

Former trade union of the United Kingdom

The Amalgamated Society of General Tool Makers, Engineers and Machinists, often known as the Amalgamated Toolmakers, was a trade union representing factory workers in the United Kingdom.

The union was founded in 1882 as the National Society of General Tool Makers, Engineers and Machinists. In 1891, it was a founder of the Federation of Engineering and Shipbuilding Trades. It grew rapidly, reaching more than 4,500 members by 1910, and more than 21,400 in 1915. In 1920, the union merged with the Amalgamated Society of Engineers and several smaller unions to form the Amalgamated Engineering Union.

== General Secretaries ==
1890s: Will Beston
