= Coventry East =

UK Parliament constituency (1945–1974, 2024 onwards)

Coordinates: 52.425°N 1.46°W

- Borough constituency for the House of Commons
- Interactive map of boundaries from 2024
- Boundary of Coventry East in West Midlands region
- County: West Midlands county
- Electorate: 73,389 (2023)
- Major settlements: Coventry

Current constituency
- Created: 2024
- Member of Parliament: Mary Creagh (Labour)
- Seats: One
- Created from: Coventry North East

1945–1974
- Seats: One
- Created from: Coventry
- Replaced by: Coventry North East, Coventry South East

Coventry East is a parliamentary constituency in the city of Coventry in the West Midlands. Having previously existed from 1945 to 1974, the seat was re-established for the 2024 general election in the 2023 Periodic Review of Westminster constituencies, formed primarily from the abolished constituency of Coventry North East. The current MP is Mary Creagh of the Labour Party; she previously represented Wakefield from 2005 to 2019.

== Constituency profile ==
Coventry East is a mostly urban and suburban constituency which covers the eastern and north-eastern neighbourhoods of Coventry, a city in the West Midlands. Parts of the city contained within the constituency include Foleshill, Longford, Wyken, Walsgrave on Sowe, Binley and Willenhall. Coventry is a historic cathedral city which became an important centre for the British motor industry in the mid-20th century, but suffered a decline after the closure of most factories in the 1980s. The constituency has high levels of deprivation, with many areas falling within the 10% most-deprived in England, although the suburb of Binley is more affluent.

Compared to national averages, residents of Coventry East are generally younger and have low levels of income, education and professional employment. The constituency is ethnically diverse; 61% of residents are White, 21% are Asian (primarily Indian) and 11% are Black. The Asian population is concentrated around Foleshill, where they make up around half the population, and the constituency has a large Sikh community (6%). At the city council, all wards in the constituency are represented by Labour Party councillors. Voters in Coventry East strongly supported leaving the European Union in the 2016 referendum with an estimated 61% voting in favour of Brexit compared to 52% nationwide.

== Boundaries ==
=== 1945–1974 ===
1945–1950: The County Borough of Coventry wards of All Saints, Foleshill, Hernall, Hillfields, Longford, Lower Stoke, St Mary's, St Paul's, Upper Stoke, and Walsgrave.

1950–1974: The County Borough of Coventry wards of Charterhouse and Binley, Longford, Lower Stoke, Upper Stoke, and Walsgrave.

=== 2024–present ===
Following the 2023 Periodic Review of Westminster constituencies which became effective for the 2024 general election, the re-established constituency is composed of the City of Coventry wards of:

- Binley and Willenhall, Foleshill, Henley, Longford, Upper Stoke, and Wyken.

The seat comprises the previous Coventry North East seat, after transferring the Lower Stoke ward to Coventry South in exchange for the Binley and Willenhall ward.

== History ==
Until 1945, the city of Coventry was represented by a single Member. Population growth meant that it had grown to 89,001 electors at the time of the 1935 general election, and in the 1939 electoral register it had 87,487 electors. The County Borough of Coventry had also expanded its boundaries in the late 1930s, taking in an additional 66,425 electors. Two nearby divisions of Warwickshire had exceptionally large electorates: Nuneaton at 112,503 and Tamworth at 118,131. Accordingly, the area was included in the Schedule to the House of Commons (Redistribution of Seats) Act 1944 as abnormally large constituencies to be divided by the Boundary Commission before the first post-war general election.

The Boundary Commission proposed to create two divisions within the new boundaries of the County Borough, with Coventry East comprising ten wards and having a 1939 electorate of 76,860. On the new electoral register compiled for the 1945 general election, the constituency had 74,676 electors on the civilian residence register, 67 on the Business Premises register, and 5,166 on the service register.

A new Boundary Commission review began in 1965 by which time Coventry's electorate had increased and the city was allocated four seats; they were named after the ordinal points of the compass. The recommendations of the Commission came into effect at the February 1974 general election, at which point Coventry East ceased to exist as a Parliamentary constituency. This coincided with Richard Crossman's retirement from parliament; he died of liver cancer two months after the election.

== Members of Parliament ==
=== MPs 1945–1974 ===
Election	Member	Party
1945	Richard Crossman	Labour
Feb 1974	Constituency abolished	

=== MPs since 2024 ===
Coventry North East prior to 2024

Election	Member	Party
2024	Mary Creagh	Labour

== Election results ==
=== Elections in the 2020s ===
General election 2024: Coventry East
Party	Candidate	Votes	%	±%
Labour	Mary Creagh	18,308	49.5	−2.6
Reform	Iddrisu Sufyan	6,685	18.1	+13.0
Conservative	Sarah Cooper-Lesadd	6,240	16.9	−18.1
Green	Stephen Gray	2,730	7.4	+5.1
Liberal Democrats	Mike Massimi	1,227	3.3	−2.1
Workers Party	Paul Bedson	1,027	2.8	New
TUSC	Dave Nellist	797	2.2	New
Majority		11,623	31.3	
Turnout		37,014	48.8	
Registered electors		75,801		
Labour win (new seat)				

== Election results 1945–1974 ==
=== Elections in the 1940s ===
General election 1945: Coventry East
Party	Candidate	Votes	%	±%
Labour	Richard Crossman	34,379	60.51	
Conservative	Harry Weston	15,630	27.51	
Communist	William Alexander	3,986	7.02	
Liberal	Charles Payne	2,820	4.96	
Majority		18,479	32.50	
Turnout		56,815	71.15	
Registered electors		79,853		
Labour win (new seat)				

=== Elections in the 1950s ===
General election 1950: Coventry East
Party	Candidate	Votes	%	±%
Labour	Richard Crossman	30,456	59.29	−1.22
Conservative	Timothy Berthier Meek	17,003	33.10	+5.59
Liberal	Samuel Henry Davis	3,420	6.66	+1.70
Communist	William Alexander	487	0.95	−6.07
Majority		13,453	26.19	−6.31
Turnout		51,366	88.18	+17.03
Registered electors		58,254		
Labour hold		Swing	−3.41	

General election 1951: Coventry East
Party	Candidate	Votes	%	±%
Labour	Richard Crossman	32,108	62.29	+3.00
Conservative	Gavin Welby	19,437	37.71	+4.61
Majority		12,671	24.58	−1.61
Turnout		51,545	85.74	−2.44
Registered electors		60,115		
Labour hold		Swing	−0.81	

General election 1955: Coventry East
Party	Candidate	Votes	%	±%
Labour	Richard Crossman	27,712	56.19	−6.10
Conservative	Michael Ayerst Hooker	21,608	43.81	+6.10
Majority		6,104	12.38	−12.20
Turnout		49,320	81.16	−4.58
Registered electors		60,769		
Labour hold		Swing	−6.10	

General election 1959: Coventry East
Party	Candidate	Votes	%	±%
Labour	Richard Crossman	32,744	56.72	+0.53
Conservative	John Biffen	24,982	43.28	−0.53
Majority		7,762	13.44	+1.06
Turnout		57,726	81.66	+0.50
Registered electors		70,689		
Labour hold		Swing	+0.53	

=== Elections in the 1960s ===
General election 1964: Coventry East
Party	Candidate	Votes	%	±%
Labour	Richard Crossman	36,246	59.82	+3.10
Conservative	Ian Gow	23,208	38.30	−4.98
Communist	Harry Bourne	1,138	1.88	New
Majority		13,038	21.52	+8.08
Turnout		60,592	77.86	−3.80
Registered electors		77,821		
Labour hold		Swing	+4.04	

General election 1966: Coventry East
Party	Candidate	Votes	%	±%
Labour	Richard Crossman	36,757	60.83	+1.01
Conservative	John Wakeham	18,061	29.89	−8.41
Liberal	Jan Maria Mokrzycki	4,235	7.01	New
Communist	Harry Bourne	1,368	2.26	+0.38
Majority		18,696	30.94	+9.42
Turnout		60,421	77.33	−0.53
Registered electors		78,131		
Labour hold		Swing	+4.71	

=== Elections in the 1970s ===
General election 1970: Coventry East
Party	Candidate	Votes	%	±%
Labour	Richard Crossman	36,275	59.34	−1.49
Conservative	Maurice Edward Jones	24,010	39.27	+9.38
Communist	John Hosey	841	1.38	−0.88
Majority		12,265	20.07	−10.87
Turnout		61,126	70.58	−6.75
Registered electors		86,603		
Labour hold		Swing	−5.44	

== See also ==
- List of parliamentary constituencies in the West Midlands (county)
- List of parliamentary constituencies in West Midlands (region)
