= Coventry North East =

UK Parliament constituency (1974–2024)

- Former borough constituency for the House of Commons
- 2010–2024 boundary of Coventry North East in West Midlands

- Location of West Midlands within England
- County: West Midlands
- Electorate: 74,870 (December 2010)
- Major settlements: Coventry

1974–2024
- Seats: One
- Created from: Coventry North, Coventry East
- Replaced by: Coventry East; Coventry South (minor part)

Coventry North East was a constituency (Note: A borough constituency (for the purposes of election expenses and type of returning officer)) represented in the House of Commons of the UK Parliament.

Further to the completion of the 2023 review of Westminster constituencies, the seat will be subject to boundary changes. As a consequence, it will be renamed Coventry East, to be first contested at the 2024 general election.

== Constituency profile ==
In the seat is a wide demographic mix: across it is scattered an above UK average level of social housing and unemployment claimants. However, income is close to the UK average. The constituency has a large ethnic minority population, consisting mainly of Sikhs and Muslims; one ward, Foleshill, has a majority ethnic minority population.

== Boundaries ==
Map of boundaries 1997–2024

Based entirely within the borough of Coventry, the seat of Coventry North East includes the Stoke, Walsgrave-on-Sowe, Wyken, Longford, and Foleshill areas of the cathedral city.

1974–1983: The County Borough of Coventry wards of Foleshill, Henley, Longford, Upper Stoke, and Wyken.

1983–1997: The City of Coventry wards of Foleshill, Henley, Longford, Upper Stoke, and Wyken.

1997–2024: The City of Coventry wards of Foleshill, Henley, Longford, Lower Stoke, Upper Stoke, and Wyken.

== History ==
Since its 1974 creation, the area has been a Labour Party stronghold and their safest seat in Coventry, with the Conservative Party finishing second. The Liberal Democrats (including their two predecessor parties) amassed their largest shares of the vote in 1983 and in 2010, on 16.6% of the vote. In 2010, between 2% and 5% of the vote went to British National Party, Socialist and UKIP candidates. Completing the choice of seven was a Christian party candidate, who attracted the fewest votes.

== Members of Parliament ==
Election	Member	Party
Feb 1974	George Park	Labour
1987	John Hughes	Labour
1992	Bob Ainsworth	Labour
2015	Colleen Fletcher	Labour
2024	Constituency abolished	

== Election results 1974–2024 ==
=== Elections in the 1970s ===
February 1974 general election: Coventry North East
Party	Candidate	Votes	%	±%
Labour	George Park	30,496	63.9	
Conservative	Nigel Forman	15,069	31.6	
PEOPLE	Alan Pickard	1,332	2.8	
Communist	John Hosey	838	1.8	
Majority		15,427	32.3	
Turnout		47,735	75.5	
Labour win (new seat)				

October 1974 general election: Coventry North East
Party	Candidate	Votes	%	±%
Labour	George Park	26,489	59.5	−4.4
Conservative	Ian Clarke	10,520	23.6	−8.0
Liberal	Roy Dredge	6,846	15.4	New
Workers Revolutionary	Alan Wilkins	352	0.8	New
Communist	John Hosey	309	0.7	−1.1
Majority		15,969	35.9	+3.6
Turnout		44,516	70.0	−5.5
Labour hold		Swing	+1.8	

1979 general election: Coventry North East
Party	Candidate	Votes	%	±%
Labour	George Park	27,010	57.3	−2.2
Conservative	Charles Petty-Fitzmaurice	16,487	35.0	+11.4
Liberal	Raj-Mal Singh	2,291	4.9	−10.5
National Front	H. Robbins	546	1.2	New
Communist	Paul Corrigan	390	0.8	+0.1
Workers Revolutionary	S. Perkin	378	0.8	0.0
Majority		10,523	22.3	−13.6
Turnout		47,062	72.7	+2.7
Labour hold		Swing	−6.8	

=== Elections in the 1980s ===
1983 general election: Coventry North East
Party	Candidate	Votes	%	±%
Labour	George Park	22,190	47.8	−9.5
Conservative	David Weeks	13,415	28.9	−6.1
SDP	David Simmons	10,251	22.1	+18.1
Workers Revolutionary	Robert Prince	342	0.7	−0.1
Communist	John Meacham	193	0.4	−0.4
Majority		8,775	18.9	−3.4
Turnout		46,389	69.2	+1.3
Labour hold		Swing		

1987 general election: Coventry North East
Party	Candidate	Votes	%	±%
Labour	John Hughes	25,832	54.3	+6.5
Conservative	Charles Prior	13,965	29.3	+0.4
Liberal	Stephen Woods	7,502	15.8	−6.3
Communist	Michael McNally	310	0.7	+0.3
Majority		11,867	25.0	+6.1
Turnout		47,573	70.5	+1.3
Labour hold		Swing		

=== Elections in the 1990s ===
1992 general election: Coventry North East
Party	Candidate	Votes	%	±%
Labour	Bob Ainsworth	24,896	52.5	−1.8
Conservative	Keith R. Perrin	13,220	27.9	−1.4
Liberal Democrats	Vincent J. McKee	5,306	11.2	−4.6
Independent Labour	John Hughes	4,008	8.5	New
Majority		11,676	24.6	−0.4
Turnout		47,430	73.2	+2.7
Labour hold		Swing	−0.2	

1997 general election: Coventry North East
Party	Candidate	Votes	%	±%
Labour	Bob Ainsworth	31,856	66.3	+16.6
Conservative	Michael Burnett	9,287	19.3	−8.7
Liberal Democrats	Geoffrey Sewards	3,866	8.0	−2.5
Liberal	Nick Brown	1,181	2.5	New
Referendum	Ron Hurrell	1,125	2.3	New
Socialist Labour	Hanna Khamis	597	1.2	New
Rainbow Dream Ticket	Christopher Sidwell	173	0.4	New
Majority		22,569	47.0	+25.3
Turnout		48,085	64.8	
Labour hold		Swing		

=== Elections in the 2000s ===
2001 general election: Coventry North East
Party	Candidate	Votes	%	±%
Labour	Bob Ainsworth	22,739	61.0	−5.3
Conservative	Gordon Bell	6,988	18.8	−0.5
Liberal Democrats	Geoffrey Sewards	4,163	11.2	+3.2
Socialist Alliance	Dave Nellist	2,638	7.1	New
BNP	Edward Sheppard	737	2.0	New
Majority		15,751	42.2	−4.8
Turnout		37,265	50.3	−14.5
Labour hold		Swing		

2005 general election: Coventry North East
Party	Candidate	Votes	%	±%
Labour	Bob Ainsworth	21,178	56.94	−4.1
Conservative	Jaswant Singh Birdi	6,956	18.70	−0.1
Liberal Democrats	Russell Field	6,123	16.46	+5.3
Socialist	Dave Nellist	1,874	5.04	−2.1
UKIP	Paul Sootheran	1,064	2.9	New
Majority		14,222	38.24	+4.0
Turnout		37,195	52.97	+2.61
Labour hold		Swing	−2.0	

=== Elections in the 2010s ===
2010 general election: Coventry North East
Party	Candidate	Votes	%	±%
Labour	Bob Ainsworth	21,384	49.3	−7.6
Conservative	Hazel Noonan	9,609	22.1	+3.3
Liberal Democrats	Russell Field	7,210	16.6	+0.1
BNP	Tom Gower	1,863	4.3	New
Socialist	Dave Nellist	1,592	3.7	−1.2
UKIP	Chris Forbes	1,291	3.0	−0.1
Christian Movement for Great Britain	Ron Lebar	434	1.0	New
Majority		11,775	27.2	−11.0
Turnout		43,383	59.4	+6.0
Labour hold		Swing	−5.5	

2015 general election: Coventry North East
Party	Candidate	Votes	%	±%
Labour	Colleen Fletcher	22,025	52.2	+2.9
Conservative	Michelle Lowe	9,751	23.1	+1.0
UKIP	Avtar Taggar	6,278	14.9	+11.9
Liberal Democrats	Russell Field	2,007	4.8	−11.8
Green	Matthew Handley	1,245	2.9	New
TUSC	Nicky Downes	633	1.5	New
Christian Movement for Great Britain	William Sidhu	292	0.7	−0.3
Majority		12,274	29.1	+1.9
Turnout		42,231	55.3	−4.1
Labour hold		Swing		

2017 general election: Coventry North East
Party	Candidate	Votes	%	±%
Labour	Colleen Fletcher	29,499	63.4	+11.2
Conservative	Timothy Mayer	13,919	29.9	+6.8
UKIP	Avtar Taggar	1,350	2.9	−12.0
Liberal Democrats	Russell Field	1,157	2.5	−2.3
Green	Matthew Handley	502	1.1	−1.8
Independent	Afzal Mahmood	81	0.2	New
Majority		15,580	33.5	+4.4
Turnout		46,508	61.4	+6.1
Labour hold		Swing	+2.25	

2019 general election: Coventry North East
Party	Candidate	Votes	%	±%
Labour	Colleen Fletcher	23,412	52.7	−10.7
Conservative	Sophie Richards	15,720	35.4	+5.5
Brexit Party	Iddrisu Sufyan	2,110	4.7	New
Liberal Democrats	Nukey Proctor	2,061	4.6	+2.1
Green	Matthew Handley	1,141	2.6	+1.5
Majority		7,692	17.3	−16.2
Turnout		44,444	58.5	−2.9
Labour hold		Swing		

== See also ==
- List of parliamentary constituencies in the West Midlands (county)
