= Consett (constituency) =

Parliamentary constituency in the United Kingdom, 1918–1983

- Former county constituency for the House of Commons
- Boundary of Consett in County Durham, boundaries 1974–1983

1918–1983
- Seats: one
- Created from: North West Durham
- Replaced by: North Durham and North West Durham

Consett was a county constituency, centred on the town of Consett in County Durham. It returned one Member of Parliament (MP) to the House of Commons of the Parliament of the United Kingdom, elected by the first past the post voting system from 1918 to 1983.

== History ==
=== Creation ===
Consett was created under the Representation of the People Act 1918 for the 1918 general election. It succeeded the abolished North West Division of Durham, comprising the whole of that seat, excluding Tanfield, which was included in the new constituency of Blaydon, and Lanchester, which was transferred to Barnard Castle.

=== Boundaries ===
==== 1918–1950 ====
- The Urban Districts of Annfield Plain, Benfieldside, Consett, Leadgate, and Stanley; and
- in the Rural District of Lanchester, the parishes of Craghead, Ebchester, Healeyfield, Knitsley, and Medomsley.

==== 1950–1983 ====
- The Urban Districts of Consett and Stanley.

Only minor changes - the Urban Districts of Annfield Plain and Tanfield (transferred back from Blaydon) had been merged with Stanley; and Benfieldside and Leadgate with Consett, along with the parishes of Ebchester and Medomsley.

=== Abolition ===
The seat was abolished for the 1983 general election as a result of the periodic review of parliamentary constituencies following the re-organisation of local government under the Local Government Act 1972. On abolition, eastern areas, comprising the former Urban District of Stanley, were included in the newly created constituency of North Durham, and eastern areas, comprising the former Urban District of Consett, were transferred back to North West Durham (which had been re-established in 1950).

== Members of Parliament ==
Election	Member	Party
1918	Aneurin Williams	Liberal
1922	Herbert Dunnico	Labour
1931	John Dickie	Liberal National
1935	David Adams	Labour
1943	James Glanville	Labour
1955	William Stones	Labour
1966	David Watkins	Labour
1983	constituency abolished	

== Election results ==
=== Elections in the 1910s ===
Aneurin Williams

General election 1918: Consett
Party		Candidate	Votes	%	±%
	Liberal	Aneurin Williams	7,576	34.3	
C	National Democratic	Robert Gee	7,283	32.9	
	Labour	G. H. Stuart-Bunning	7,268	32.8	
Majority			293	1.4	
Turnout			22,127	64.3	
	Liberal win (new seat)				
C indicates candidate endorsed by the coalition government.

=== Elections in the 1920s ===
General election 1922: Consett
Party	Candidate	Votes	%	±%
Labour	Herbert Dunnico	14,469	46.5	+13.7
Liberal	Aneurin Williams	9,870	31.8	−2.5
Unionist	Sydney Erskine Dare Wilson	6,745	21.7	New
Majority		4,599	14.7	N/A
Turnout		31,084	82.0	+17.7
Registered electors		37,886		
Labour gain from Liberal		Swing	+8.1	

Ursula Williams

General election 1923: Consett
Party	Candidate	Votes	%	±%
Labour	Herbert Dunnico	15,862	52.0	+5.5
Liberal	Ursula Williams	14,619	48.0	+16.2
Majority		1,243	4.0	−10.7
Turnout		30,481	78.2	−3.8
Registered electors		38,989		
Labour hold		Swing	−5.4	

General election 1924: Consett
Party	Candidate	Votes	%	±%
Labour	Herbert Dunnico	18,842	55.9	+3.9
Constitutionalist	James E Davies	14,836	44.1	New
Majority		4,006	11.8	+7.8
Turnout		33,678	83.4	+5.2
Registered electors		40,363		
Labour hold		Swing		

General election 1929: Consett
Party	Candidate	Votes	%	±%
Labour	Herbert Dunnico	22,256	56.5	+0.6
Liberal	John Dickie	10,772	27.3	New
Unionist	John William Watts	6,400	16.2	N/A
Majority		11,484	29.2	+17.4
Turnout		39,428	80.1	−3.3
Registered electors		49,233		
Labour hold		Swing		

=== Elections in the 1930s ===
General election 1931: Consett
Party	Candidate	Votes	%	±%
National Liberal	John Dickie	22,474	53.0	+25.7
Labour	Herbert Dunnico	19,927	47.0	−9.5
Majority		2,547	6.01	N/A
Turnout		42,401	83.24	+3.1
National Liberal gain from Labour		Swing	+17.6	

General election 1935: Consett
Party	Candidate	Votes	%	±%
Labour	David Adams	25,419	58.7	+11.7
National Liberal	John Dickie	17,897	41.3	−11.7
Majority		7,522	17.4	+11.4
Turnout		43,316	83.8	+0.6
Labour gain from National Liberal		Swing		

General Election 1939–40: Another General Election was required to take place before the end of 1940. The political parties had been making preparations for an election to take place and by the Autumn of 1939, the following candidates had been selected;

- Labour: David Adams

=== Elections in the 1940s ===
1943 Consett by-election
Party	Candidate	Votes	%	±%
Labour	James Glanville	Unopposed	N/A	N/A
Labour hold				

General election 1945: Consett
Party	Candidate	Votes	%	±%
Labour	James Glanville	28,617	70.1	+11.4
National Liberal	James Aloysius McGilley	12,198	29.9	−11.4
Majority		16,419	40.2	+22.8
Turnout		40,815	77.4	−6.4
Labour hold		Swing		

=== Elections in the 1950s ===
General election 1950: Consett
Party	Candidate	Votes	%	±%
Labour	James Glanville	34,907	66.79	
Conservative	Philip Goodhart	12,634	24.17	
Liberal	Norman Dees	4,721	9.03	New
Majority		22,273	42.62	
Turnout		52,262	86.84	
Labour hold		Swing		

General election 1951: Consett
Party	Candidate	Votes	%	±%
Labour	James Glanville	35,705	69.24	
Conservative	George Frederick H Walker	15,861	30.76	
Majority		19,844	38.48	
Turnout		51,566	85.06	
Labour hold		Swing		

General election 1955: Consett
Party	Candidate	Votes	%	±%
Labour	William Stones	30,979	67.05	
Conservative	Fergus Montgomery	15,224	32.95	
Majority		15,755	34.10	
Turnout		46,203	77.51	
Labour hold		Swing		

General election 1959: Consett
Party	Candidate	Votes	%	±%
Labour	William Stones	32,307	66.83	
Conservative	Denis Alan Orde	16,037	33.17	
Majority		16,270	33.66	
Turnout		48,344	81.65	
Labour hold		Swing		

=== Elections in the 1960s ===
General election 1964: Consett
Party	Candidate	Votes	%	±%
Labour	William Stones	29,676	68.10	
Conservative	Denis W Stokoe	13,901	31.90	
Majority		15,775	36.20	
Turnout		43,577	76.73	
Labour hold		Swing		

General election 1966: Consett
Party	Candidate	Votes	%	±%
Labour	David Watkins	29,753	73.26	
Conservative	Robert William G Sanderson	10,858	26.74	
Majority		18,895	46.52	
Turnout		40,611	73.51	
Labour hold		Swing		

=== Elections in the 1970s ===
General election 1970: Consett
Party	Candidate	Votes	%	±%
Labour	David Watkins	28,985	70.87	
Conservative	Neville Trotter	11,914	29.13	
Majority		17,071	41.74	
Turnout		40,899	70.17	
Labour hold		Swing		

General election February 1974: Consett
Party	Candidate	Votes	%	±%
Labour	David Watkins	27,401	61.10	
Conservative	T Wilkinson	9,058	20.20	
Liberal	R McClure	8,384	18.70	New
Majority		18,343	40.90	
Turnout		44,843	76.50	
Labour hold		Swing		

General election October 1974: Consett
Party	Candidate	Votes	%	±%
Labour	David Watkins	27,123	66.98	
Conservative	M Lycett	7,677	18.96	
Liberal	J Gillinder	5,695	14.06	
Majority		19,446	48.02	
Turnout		40,495	68.62	
Labour hold		Swing		

General election 1979: Consett
Party	Candidate	Votes	%	±%
Labour	David Watkins	26,708	61.26	
Conservative	M Lycett	10,841	24.87	
Liberal	R Kennedy	6,048	13.87	
Majority		15,867	36.39	
Turnout		43,597	75.76	
Labour hold		Swing		

== See also ==
- History of parliamentary constituencies and boundaries in Durham
