= David Adams (Labour politician) =

British politician

Member of Parliament for Consett
- In office 14 November 1935 – 16 August 1943
- Preceded by: John Dickie
- Succeeded by: James Glanville

Member of Parliament for Newcastle upon Tyne West
- In office 15 November 1922 – 6 December 1923
- Preceded by: Edward Shortt
- Succeeded by: Cecil Ramage

Personal details
- Born: 27 June 1871
- Died: 16 August 1943 (aged 72) Jesmond, England
- Party: Labour
- Spouse: Elizabeth Havelock Patterson (m. 1897)
- Children: 3
- Education: Armstrong College

David Adams (27 June 1871 – 16 August 1943) was a British Labour politician who served as the Member of Parliament (MP) for Newcastle upon Tyne West from 1922 to 1923, and Consett from 1935 until his death in 1943. A major figure in northern governance, he also served as the Lord Mayor of Newcastle upon Tyne and was an active housing reformer inspired by the garden city movement.

== Career ==
He was educated at the School of Art and Science at Newcastle's Armstrong College. He took up a career as an engineer with the local shipping company of D. Adams and Company and the Anglo-Scottish Trading Company. He was elected to Newcastle City Council in 1902, and held the office of Sheriff from 1922 to 1923 and Lord Mayor from 1930 to 1931.

At the 1918 general election, he was an unsuccessful candidate in the new Newcastle upon Tyne West constituency, losing to the Liberal Party cabinet minister Edward Shortt. Shortt stood down at the 1922 general election, and Adams won the seat with a majority of only 156 over the National Liberal candidate Cecil Ramage. At the 1923 general election, Ramage took the seat from Adams with a majority of over 3,500.

Adams unsuccessfully contested City of York at the 1924 general election and Barrow-in-Furness at the 1931 contest. He returned to the House of Commons following the 1935 general election as the MP for Consett, County Durham, gaining a majority of 7,522 over the National Liberals. Following his death, Adams was succeeded by James Glanville in the 1943 Consett by-election.

During the Spanish Civil War, Adams emerged as an increasingly overt supporter of the anti-fascist Spanish Republican cause. As the only Catholic Labour MP from the North-East of England, his stance was considered highly significant. He ultimately signed a high-profile letter in early 1938 calling upon Catholic bishops to denounce the Francisco Franco rebellion. By January 1939, his support had grown to the point of speaking at the North-East International Brigade memorial meeting, and he was one of only four regional Labour MPs to sign the Brigade's Memorial Fund appeal.

In 1940, Adams was included in the Sonderfahndungsliste G.B. ("Special Search List G.B."), a secret list compiled by the SS. Commonly known as "The Black Book", it detailed prominent British figures slated for immediate arrest by the Gestapo in the event of a successful German invasion of the United Kingdom.

=== Housing reform and the Walkerville Exhibition ===
Adams's election to Newcastle City Council in 1902 aligned with growing regional concern over substandard housing conditions and municipal intervention. He became one of the prime political campaigners driving local housing reform, strongly influenced by the Garden city movement.

Under the auspices of the National Housing Reform Council, Councillor Adams spearheaded the development of the Walkerville model housing exhibition in 1908 on the Corporation estate in Walker. The exhibition served as an early framework for small-scale British town planning prior to the passage of the Housing, Town Planning, &c. Act 1909. It showcased a variety of innovative "model cottages" containing two to three bedrooms designed for working-class families, providing them with ample green space. Adams widely documented the progression and philosophy behind the planning of the Walker and Willington estates in a series of articles written for The Northern Echo.

== Personal life ==
Adams married Elizabeth Havelock Patterson in 1897; the couple had two sons and a daughter. During Adams's term as Lord Mayor, she "ably assisted" him as lady mayoress.

Elizabeth was originally from Blyth and was the only child of Captain John Patterson. Elizabeth's father started his seafaring career on the old Blyth windjammers before commanding steamships. He died suddenly on shipboard in the Black Sea and was buried in Odessa. The Patterson family were close associates of shipping magnate and Liberal politician Lord Runciman, with John Patterson serving as his first ever captain and his brother "Harry" Henry Patterson as Runciman's closest friend. Her uncle George Dobson Patterson was a government architect who designed some of the largest post offices in the United Kingdom. Henry Patterson of Gosforth was a "well-known" temperance reformer described as a "wonder-man in vigour" after living past the age of 80. He worked closely at the North of England Temperance League with its president, the "Radical Countess" of Carlisle, serving as the honorary secretary of the league's executive committee.

== Death ==
He died at his home at Jesmond, Newcastle on 16 August 1943, aged 72.

Parliament of the United Kingdom
Preceded by Edward Shortt	Member of Parliament for Newcastle upon Tyne West; 1922–1923	Succeeded by Cecil Ramage
Preceded by John Purcell Dickie	Member of Parliament for Consett; 1935–1943	Succeeded by James Edward Glanville
