= Ted Garrett =

British politician

Member of Parliament for Wallsend
- In office 15 October 1964 – 16 March 1992
- Preceded by: John McKay
- Succeeded by: Stephen Byers

Personal details
- Born: William Edward Garrett; 21 March 1920
- Died: 30 May 1993 (aged 73)
- Party: Labour
- Education: London School of Economics

William Edward Garrett (21 March 1920 – 30 May 1993) was a British Labour Party politician.

Garrett was educated at the London School of Economics and was an engineer and maintenance fitter. He was a councillor on Northumberland County Council and Prudhoe Urban District Council.

Garrett contested Hexham in 1955 and Doncaster in 1959. He was Member of Parliament for Wallsend from 1964 until he retired in 1992. His successor was Stephen Byers. Garrett died the following year, aged 73.

Parliament of the United Kingdom
Preceded by John McKay	Member of Parliament for Wallsend; 1964–1992	Succeeded by Stephen Byers
