= George Park (politician) =

British politician

George MacLean Park (27 September 1914 – 8 May 1994) was a British Labour Party politician.

Born in Glasgow, Park was educated at Onslow Drive School and Whitehill Secondary School in the Dennistoun area of the city, then moved to Coventry, where he studied at Coventry Technical College. He worked in the motor industry in Coventry, where he was the Amalgamated Engineering Union convenor at the Ryton Plant of the (then) Rootes Group. He was a councillor in the Holbrooks Ward and later leader of Coventry City Council and the West Midlands County Council.

Park was the member of parliament (MP) for Coventry North East from the February 1974 general election to 1987. He was a TGWU-sponsored MP and was parliamentary private secretary to Eric Varley. He was also sponsored by the Amalgamated Engineering Union.

He decided not to stand for re-election in the run-up to the 1987 general election, after the left wing won control of his Constituency Labour Party. His successor was John Hughes.

Parliament of the United Kingdom
New constituency	Member of Parliament for Coventry North East; February 1974–1987	Succeeded by John Hughes
