= Modern Records Centre, University of Warwick =

Archive centre of the University of Warwick

The Modern Records Centre and the library extension

The Modern Records Centre (MRC) is the specialist archive service of the University of Warwick in Coventry, England, located adjacent to the Central Campus Library. It was established in October 1973 and holds the world's largest archive collection on British industrial relations, as well as archives relating to many other aspects of British social, political and economic history.

The BP corporate archive is located next to the MRC, but has separate staff and facilities.

== Holdings ==
=== Trade unions ===
The Modern Records Centre holds by far the largest collection of archives of British trade unions in the country. The largest collection held in the centre is the archive of the Trades Union Congress (TUC).

Other significant collections of archives relating to British trade unions include:

- Amalgamated Engineering Union / Amalgamated Society of Engineers
- Amalgamated Slaters' and Tilers' Provident Society
- Amalgamated Society of Carpenters and Joiners
- Amalgamated Society of Lithographic Printers and Auxiliaries
- Amalgamated Society of Woodworkers
- Amalgamated Union of Building Trade Workers
- Associated Blacksmiths', Forge and Smithy Workers' Society / Associated Blacksmiths' Society
- Associated Society of Locomotive Engineers and Firemen (ASLEF)
- Association of Assistant Mistresses
- Association of Building Technicians / Association of Architects, Surveyors and Technical Assistants
- Association of Engineering and Shipbuilding Draughtsmen
- Association of Executive Officers / Second Division Clerks' Association
- Association of Head Mistresses
- Association of Professional, Executive, Clerical and Computer Staff (APEX)/ Clerical and Administrative Workers' Union / National Union of Clerks
- Association of Scientific, Technical and Managerial Staffs (ASTMS)
- Association of Scientific Workers
- Association of Supervisory Staffs, Executives and Technicians (ASSET) / National Foremen's Association
- Association of Teachers in Colleges and Departments of Education
- Association of Teachers in Technical Institutions
- Association of University Teachers
- Barclays Bank Staff Association
- British Airline Pilots' Association
- Civil and Public Services Association / Civil Service Clerical Association
- Communication Managers' Association / Post Office Management Staffs Association / Association of Post Office Controlling Officers
- Community and Youth Workers' Union
- Confederation of Health Service Employees (COHSE)
- Connect
- Constructional Engineering Union
- Electrical Trades Union
- Fire Brigades Union
- Friendly Society of Iron Founders
- Friendly Society of Operative Stonemasons
- General Union of Carpenters and Joiners
- Guild of Insurance Officials
- Headmasters' Association / Incorporated Association of Headmasters
- Inland Revenue Staff Federation
- Iron and Steel Trades Confederation
- London Society of Compositors
- London Typographical Society
- Manchester Unity of Operative Bricklayers' Society
- Mental Hospital and Institutional Workers' Union / National Asylum Workers' Union
- Midland Bank Staff Association
- Monotype Casters' and Typefounders' Society / Amalgamated Typefounders' Trade Society
- National Amalgamated Stevedores and Dockers
- National and Local Government Officers' Association (NALGO)
- National Association of Operative Plasterers
- National Association of Schoolmasters
- National Association of Teachers in Further and Higher Education
- National Graphical Association
- National League of the Blind and Disabled / National League of the Blind
- National Society of Metal Mechanics / National Society of Brass and Metal Mechanics / National Society of Amalgamated Brassworkers
- National Society of Operative Printers and Assistants (Natsopa)
- National Society of Painters / National Amalgamated Society of Operative House and Ship Painters and Decorators / National Amalgamated Society of Operative House Painters and Decorators
- National Union of Bank Employees / Bank Officers' Guild
- National Union of Boot and Shoe Operatives
- National Union of County Officers
- National Union of Enginemen, Firemen, Mechanics and Electrical Workers / National Amalgamated Union of Enginemen
- National Union of Foundry Workers / Amalgamated Union of Foundry Workers
- National Union of General and Municipal Workers
- National Union of Glovers and Leather Workers
- National Union of Hosiery and Knitwear Workers
- National Union of Journalists
- National Union of Mineworkers
- National Union of Printing, Bookbinding and Paper Workers
- National Union of Public Employees (NUPE) / National Union of Corporation Workers
- National Union of Railwaymen / Amalgamated Society of Railway Servants
- National Union of Seamen
- National Union of Sheet Metal Workers and Braziers
- National Union of Sheet Metal Workers, Coppersmiths, Heating and Domestic Engineers
- National Union of Teachers
- National Union of Vehicle Builders / United Kingdom Society of Coachmakers
- National Union of Wallcoverings, Decorative and Allied Trades / Wallpaper Workers' Union
- Operative Bricklayers' Society
- Plumbing Trades Union / United Operative Plumbers' Association
- Postmen's Federation
- Post Office Controlling Officers' Association
- Post Office Engineering Union
- Printing Machine Managers' Trade Society
- Prospect
- Prudential Staff Union
- Royal London Staff Association
- Scottish Sheet-Metal Workers' and Braziers' Friendly and Protective Society
- Sign and Display Trade Union / National Union of Sign, Glass and Ticket Writers and Kindred Trades
- Society of Chiropodists
- Society of Civil and Public Servants / Society of Civil Servants
- Society of Graphical and Allied Trades (SOGAT)
- Society of Lithographic Artists, Designers, Engravers and Process Workers (SLADE)
- Society of Radiographers
- Society of Telecommunication Engineers / Society of Post Office Engineering Inspectors
- Steel Industry Management Association
- Tobacco Workers' Union
- Training College Association
- Transport and General Workers' Union
- Transport Salaried Staffs' Association / Railway Clerks' Association
- Typographical Association
- Union of Bookmakers' Employees
- Union of Communication Workers / Union of Post Office Workers
- Unison
- Unite
- United Commercial Travellers' Association
- United Kingdom Association of Professional Engineers
- United Patternmakers' Association
- United Society of Boilermakers, Shipbuilders and Structural Workers / United Society of Boilermakers and Iron Shipbuilders
- Wallpaper Trades Superannuation Society
- Workers' Union

Significant collections relating to trade union federations include the Confederation of Employee Organisations, the Confederation of Shipbuilding and Engineering Unions, the Council of Civil Service Unions, the Federation of Post Office Supervising Officers, the General Federation of Trade Unions, the National Federation of Construction Unions (formerly the National Federation of Building Trade Operatives), the National Federation of Professional Workers, the National Joint Committee of Postal and Telegraph Associations, the Post Office Engineering Federation, and the Printing and Kindred Trades Federation.

International trade union federations are represented by major collections of the International Transport Workers' Federation and the World Federation of Scientific Workers.

Collections relating to joint trade union committees include those of the Alcan Foils Wembley Factory trade union committees, the British Leyland Trade Union Committee, Coventry Chain Shop Stewards' Committee, Coventry Trades Council, the GCHQ Trade Union Campaign Committee, and the London Transport Aldenham Bus Overhaul Works trade union committees.

The centre also holds significant collections relating to leaders of trade unions, including:

- Ernest Bevin, general secretary of the Transport and General Workers' Union, Minister of Labour and Foreign Secretary
- Rodney Bickerstaffe, general secretary of NUPE and Unison
- Frank Chapple, Baron Chapple of Hoxton, general secretary of the Electrical Trades Union and Electrical, Electronic, Telecommunication and Plumbing Union
- Percy Collick, assistant general secretary of ASLEF and Labour MP
- Frank Cousins, general secretary of the Transport and General Workers' Union and Minister of Technology
- Frank Crump, general secretary of the National Amalgamated Union of Life Assurance Workers
- Brenda Dean, Baroness Dean of Thornton-le-Fylde, general secretary of SOGAT '82
- R. A. W. Emerick, general secretary of the Amalgamated Society of Lithographic Printers
- Alan Fisher, general secretary of NUPE
- Sir Joseph Hallsworth, general secretary of the Amalgamated Union of Co-operative Employees, National Union of Distributive and Allied Workers, and Union of Shop, Distributive and Allied Workers
- Clive Jenkins, general secretary of ASSET, ASTMS and the MSF
- Jack Jones, general secretary of the Transport and General Workers' Union
- Bill Morris, Baron Morris of Handsworth, general secretary of the Transport and General Workers' Union
- Ron Todd, general secretary of the Transport and General Workers' Union
- Paul Tofahrn, assistant general secretary of the International Transport Workers' Federation and general secretary of Public Services International
- Bob Willis, general secretary of the London Society of Compositors, London Typographical Society, and National Graphical Association
- George Woodcock, general secretary of the Trades Union Congress

Large collections of papers of more junior trade unionists include:

- Jon Appleton, of NALGO and Unison
- Alfred Best, of the National Amalgamated Union of Life Assurance Workers
- Cyril Collard, of the Association of Teachers in Technical Institutions
- John Dore, of the Association of Scientific Workers, ASTMS and the MSF
- David and Tamar Edwards, of the Amalgamated Engineering Union and the Transport and General Workers' Union respectively
- Dick Etheridge, of the Amalgamated Engineering Union
- R. Leonard Fagg, of the Post Office Engineering Union
- Monty Hughes, of the Iron and Steel Trades Confederation
- Norman Jacobs, of the Civil and Public Services Association
- J. C. McLauchlan, of the Institution of Professional Civil Servants
- David Michaelson, of the Amalgamated Engineering Union
- Peter Morgan, of NALGO
- Peter Nicholas, of the Amalgamated Engineering Union
- Aaron Rapoport Rollin, of the National Union of Tailors and Garment Workers
- William Henry Stokes, of the Amalgamated Engineering Union
- Alan Thornett, of the Transport and General Workers' Union
- Arthur Willitt, of the Post Office Engineering Union, Society of Post Office Engineering Inspectors, Society of the Post-Office Engineering Inspectorate, Society of Telecommunication Engineers, Association of Post Office Executives, and Society of Post Office Executives
- Amicia Young, of the Association of Scientific Workers

=== Industrial relations ===
The Modern Records Centre holds some collections of archives relating to joint employer/employee industrial relations negotiating committees. Significant among these are the Inland Revenue Departmental Whitley Council, the Joint Industry Board for the Electrical Contracting Industry, the Local Authorities' Conditions of Service Advisory Board (LACSAB), the National Joint Council for the Engineering Construction Industry, the National Maritime Board, and the National Whitley Council for the Civil Service.

Papers of various academics and/or conciliators concerned with industrial relations include those of Sir George Bain, William Brown, Colleen Chesterman, Hugh Clegg, Bob Fryer, Geoffrey Goodman, Richard Hyman, Grigor McClelland, Arthur Marsh, Sir Jack Scamp, and Bert Turner.

Archives of the British Universities Industrial Relations Association, Incomes Data Services and Industrial Relations Research Unit are also held.

=== Employers' and trade associations ===
The Modern Records Centre also collects archives of employers' associations and trade associations. The largest of these are the archives of the Confederation of British Industry (CBI) and its predecessor, the Federation of British Industries (FBI).

Other major association employers' and trade association collections include:

- Apparel and Fashion Industry Association
- Association of Professional Recording Services
- Biscuit, Cake, Chocolate and Confectionery Alliance
- Brewers' Society
- British Electrotechnical and Allied Manufacturers' Association
- British Employers' Confederation / National Confederation of Employers' Organisations
- British Independent Steel Producers' Association
- British Iron and Steel Consumers' Council
- British Iron and Steel Federation
- Chamber of Shipping
- Coventry and District Engineering Employers' Association
- Cycle and Motor Cycle Association / Cycle and Motor Cycle Manufacturers' and Traders' Union
- Engineering Employers' East Midlands Association
- Engineering Employers' Federation / Engineering and Allied Employers' National Federation
- Engineering Employers' West Midlands Association
- Iron and Steel Trades Employers' Association
- Knitting Industries' Federation
- National Association of British Manufacturers
- National Engineering Construction Employers' Association
- National Federation of Building Trades Employers / Association of Master Builders
- National Industrial Organisation
- Oil and Chemical Plant Constructors' Association
- Refractory Users' Federation
- Road Haulage Association
- Scottish Steel Makers' Association
- Shipping Federation
- Shirt, Collar and Tie Manufacturers' Federation
- Society of British Gas Industries
- Tea Council of Great Britain
- UK Fashion and Textile Association
- Wholesale Clothing Manufacturers' Federation

Archives of related organisations include those of the Dollar Exports Council, India, Pakistan and Burma Association, Iron and Steel Board and Trade Board (Employers') Consultative Council, as well as those of Richard Wood, an official of the Construction Industry Training Board and the National Federation of Building Trades Employers.

=== Pressure and campaigning groups ===
A second part of the Modern Records Centre's collecting base is the archives of pressure and campaigning groups. Significant among these are the archives of the:

- All Britain Anti-Poll Tax Federation
- Amnesty International
- Anti-Nazi League
- Campaign for Nuclear Disarmament (CND)
- Campaign for the Advancement of State Education
- Christian Campaign for Nuclear Disarmament
- Council for Educational Advance
- Economic League
- Family Service Units
- Howard League for Penal Reform
- Industrial Society / Industrial Welfare Society
- Involvement and Participation Association / Industrial Co-partnership Association / Labour Co-partnership Association
- Make Poverty History
- National Association for the Care and Resettlement of Offenders (NACRO) / National Association of Discharged Prisoners' Aid Societies
- National Federation of the Blind of the United Kingdom
- National Postgraduate Committee
- National Union of Students
- Release
- West Midlands Campaign for Nuclear Disarmament
- World University Service

Papers of individuals associated with campaigning and pressure groups include those of Marjory Allen, Lady Allen of Hurtwood, landscape architect, campaigner for pre-school education and child welfare, Sir Ernest Benn, publisher, libertarian and individualist, Mary Brennan, peace activist and prominent member of CND, William Driscoll, chief training officer of the Economic League, Sir Victor Gollancz, publisher and activist, Sir Leslie Scott, Conservative MP, judge and prominent member of the Council for the Preservation of Rural England, and Dame Eileen Younghusband, social worker.

=== Business ===
The Modern Records Centre holds some archives relating to business, especially the motor industry.

Archives relating to the motor industry include Jensen Motors, the Rover Company, Rubery Owen, the Standard Motor Company, and the Triumph Engineering Company.

Archives relating to other firms include Birmingham Small Arms, the British Steel Corporation, Victor Gollancz Ltd, Wallpaper Manufacturers Ltd, and J. Parnell & Son Ltd, builders, of Rugby.

The centre also holds the archives of the Transport Development Group and of Arthur Primrose Young, manager of the Rugby works of the British Thomson-Houston Company.

=== Professional associations ===
The Modern Records Centre holds a growing collection of the archives of professional associations, especially those associated with social work. Major collections in the latter area include the Association of Child Care Officers, the Association of Social Workers, the British Association of Social Workers, the Institute of Medical Social Workers, the National Association of Social Workers in Education, and the National Institute for Social Work.

Other professional associations with significant representation are the Association of Teachers of Domestic Science, the British Association for Commercial and Industrial Education, the British Institute of Management, the Headmasters' and Headmistresses' Conference, the Institute of Administrative Management, the Institute of Management Services, and the Institute of Personnel Management.

=== Politics ===
One of the collecting specialities of the Modern Records Centre is Trotskyist politics. Significant collections of papers relating to Trotskyist organisations include Bookmarks Publications, the International Marxist Group, the International Socialism Group, the Militant tendency, the Revolutionary Socialist League, the Socialist Party, Socialist Reproduction, the Socialist Vanguard Group, and the Spartacist League.

Papers of individuals associated with Trotskyist organisations include those of Chris Bambery, Colin Barker, Alan Clinton, Jimmy Deane, Reg Groves, Alistair Mutch, Geoff Pugh, Bob Purdie, Tony Whelan, and Harry Wicks.

The centre also holds the papers of several Labour Members of Parliament: Richard Crossman, Maurice Edelman, Terry Fields, William Hamling, Pat Wall, and William Wilson.

Other political holdings include the papers of former general secretary of the Labour Party Jim Mortimer, Conservative MP Derek Coombs, National Front activist Wayne Ashcroft, and the Warwick and Leamington Constituency Labour Party.

=== Education ===
A further specialisation of the Modern Records Centre is in archives concerned with education. As well as the archives of the teachers' trade unions, the Centre holds significant archive collections of the Association of Technical Institutions, the Committee of Directors of Polytechnics, the Committee of Vice-Chancellors and Principals, the Council for National Academic Awards, the Joint University Council for Social Studies, the National Council for Diplomas in Art and Design, the National Council for Technological Awards, REPLAN, the Society for Research into Higher Education, and the Universities Association for Lifelong Learning.

=== Cycling ===
The Modern Records Centre holds the National Cycle Archive, the principal archive covering all aspects of cycling history in the United Kingdom. This includes the archives of the Auto-Cycle Union, the Cyclists' Touring Club, and the National Cyclists' Union, as well as archives of many other cycling organisations and clubs, manufacturers of bicycles and accessories, and individuals connected with cycling, such as Eric Claxton, Tony Hadland, Alex Josey, Derek Roberts and Frank Rowland Whitt.

=== Operational research ===
A significant collection of material relating to operational research includes the archives of the Operational Research Branches of British Coal and the British Overseas Airways Corporation, the Department of Operational Research of the British Steel Corporation, the Institute for Operational Research, the International Federation of Operational Research Societies, the Local Government Operational Research Unit, and the Operational Research Society, as well as the papers of prominent operational researchers Ken Bowen and Stephen Cook.

=== University of Warwick ===
The Centre holds the organisational archives of the University of Warwick itself and also Coventry College of Education, which amalgamated with it in 1971. It also holds the papers of some individuals connected with the university, notably the sociologists Gillian Rose and Meg Stacey, and Sir Arthur Vick, who was the university's chairman of council and pro-chancellor.

=== Miscellaneous ===
Other significant collections include the Bristol Unity Players' Club, the Certification Office for Trade Unions and Employers' Associations, the Commercial Vehicle and Road Transport Club, the Low Pay Commission, the Royal Commission on Legal Services, the Royal Commission on the National Health Service, the Social Workers' Benevolent Trust, the Social Workers' Educational Trust, the Society for the Study of Labour History, and the Young Women's Christian Association. Papers of individuals include those of management consultant John Goddard, Catherine Hoskyns, an expert on gender politics and the European Union, and Sir George Pope, general manager of The Times.
