= Ernest Hives, 1st Baron Hives =

Chairman of Rolls-Royce Ltd.

The Right Honourable The Lord Hives CH MBE

Member of the House of Lords
- In office 7 July 1950 – 24 April 1965
- Preceded by: New peerage
- Succeeded by: John Harwick Hives

Personal details
- Born: 21 April 1886 Reading, Berkshire, England
- Died: 24 April 1965 (aged 79) London, England
- Occupation: Engineer
- Known for: Rolls-Royce Merlin

Ernest Walter Hives, 1st Baron Hives CH MBE (21 April 1886 – 24 April 1965), was the one-time head of the Rolls-Royce Aero Engine division and chairman of Rolls-Royce Ltd.

Hives was born in Reading, Berkshire to John and Mary Hives, living at 31 Christchurch Road from at least 1891 to 1901. During the Second World War he was closely involved with the design of the Merlin engine as well as numerous later Rolls-Royce jet engines. He began his working life in a local garage. However, in 1903 he got a job working at C.S. Rolls' car company, after fixing Rolls' car. He was widely known as "Hs", and signed thus.

== Achievements ==
After becoming a chief test driver in 1908, he was sent as a mechanic to tune up the car—a Rolls-Royce Silver Ghost belonging to Carlos de Salamanca—for the first-ever Spanish Grand Prix on June 15, 1913. Afterwards, he led the Rolls-Royce team in the Austrian Alpine Trialwhich began on June 22 of that same year.

During the 1914-18 First World War the company designed its first aero-engine, the Eagle, and Hives was involved in its development. In 1916 he was Head of the Experimental Department.

In 1919 the Eagle powered the twin-engined Vickers Vimy bomber on the first direct flight across the Atlantic. In 1920 Hives was appointed MBE.

Other engines were later developed under Hives' lead. Of these the Buzzard was the most important, leading to the ‘R’ series, which powered the Supermarine S.6 seaplanes that won the Schneider Trophy in 1929 and 1931 for Rolls-Royce, and most importantly the Merlin engine.

In 1936 he became the general works manager of the factory and a year later was elected to the board.

He lived at 37, St. Chads Rd., Derby until around 1937, then at 'Hazeldene', Duffield. about 5 miles north of Derby.

In 1937 he prepared the firm for a production increase in Merlin engines by splitting facilities between engineering and production and developing shadow factories. As the Merlin powered Hurricanes, Spitfires and Lancasters (as well as the best forgotten Fairey Battle), this was a vitally strategic decision when war did come, and no less than a hundred and sixty thousand Merlins were produced by 1945.

His team directive was "Work till it hurts' and W. A. Robotham said that when he was attached to "this remarkable man for a few (wartime) days I became completely exhausted and made absolutely no contribution towards easing his load. After visiting the Hillington Merlin factory, the night train arrived at Trent at the unearthly hour of 5.20 a.m. so (if you couldn't sleep on the train like Hives) walking with him round the Derby factory before breakfast was a gruelling experience. Robotham was responsible to Hives for the Car Division, and Hives supported Robotham in developing and manufacturing the Meteor tank engine.

In 1941-42 Hives had decided 'to go all out for the gas turbine', to ensure the company a leading role in developing jet engines for civil and military aviation. In December 1942 when Rover was having problems with Frank Whittle and his company Power Jets in developing their first gas turbine engine, the Rolls-Royce Welland, Hives met with Spencer Wilks of Rover and arranged to exchange Rover's gas turbine business for Rolls-Royce's Nottingham factory producing Rolls-Royce Meteor tank engines (which Rover were already producing). This exchange (effective 1 April 1943) gave Rolls-Royce (whose major product was piston aero engines) an entry into jet engine manufacture.

Vice-Chief of Air Staff Sir Wilfrid Freeman, one of the masterminds behind the dramatic advances in British aircraft production before and during World War II, paid tribute to Hives's dedication in a letter to his wife:

That man Hives is the best man I have ever come across for many a year. God knows where the RAF would have been without him. He cares for nothing except the defeat of Germany and he does all his work to that end, living a life of unending labour.

Hives became managing director in 1946 and chairman of Rolls-Royce from 1950 till 1957. He was Chairman of the National Council for Technological Awards from 1955 to 1960. He was appointed to the Order of the Companions of Honour in the 1943 Birthday Honours and on 7 July 1950 he was raised to the peerage as Baron Hives, of Duffield in the County of Derby.

Robotham has a chapter on Hives (Chapter 21) in his own biography.

At a Derby works lunch, Hives was asked by an American airline executive to what did he attribute the success of Rolls-Royce and replied "I suppose it’s because we are a little better at putting our mistakes right than most of the other people."

He played a critical role in the UK Nuclear Submarine programme. When the highly irascible but utterly pivotal U.S. Admiral Rickover visited the UK in 1957 to inspect the British nuclear design team at Rolls-Royce, Rickover was "at his obnoxious worst". After one particularly difficult morning he was introduced to Lord Hives.

'A lord eh? Chairman eh? And what are you then, a banker or a lawyer or what?’ said Rickover. 'What me? No, no, no, no, no! Me, I’m just a mechanic, just a bloody plumber.' said Hives, with a big broad smile on his face. Rickover was thrown, he had not expected that kind of answer. When Hives explained that he had known Henry Royce himself, had worked for him, and had absorbed from him his passion for engineering excellence Rickover’s mood and attitude started to improve. Hives spent much of the lunch telling a captivated Rickover about Royce’s obsession with achieving perfection. He then took Rickover on a personal tour of the works, not in a Rolls-Royce or Bentley but in a very modest Hillman. When Hives returned after showing Rickover around, the Admiral was a changed man, subdued, pleasant, cooperative, uncritical, and no further put-downs or denigrations of British engineering escaped his lips. That hour of dialogue… changed everything in the British nuclear submarine programme.

== Personal life ==
He married Gertrude E Warwick (born 9 December 1890) in 1913.

He retired in 1957 and died on 24 April 1965, aged 79, at the National Hospital for Nervous Diseases in Queen Square, London.

He was succeeded in the barony by his son John.

Another son, Pilot Officer Edward Ernest Hives, was killed in action flying with RAF Coastal Command in October 1940.

Another son was Group Captain Benjamin (Benjy) Hives who was a pilot in the Royal Air Force , amongst other appointments was a Flying Instructor at the RAF College, Cranwell, and training students, some of whom later became Air Marshals. He died in November 2019.

His younger daughter, Philippa Ann Hives, married Judge Alexander Morrison in 1978.

== Arms ==
Coat of arms of Ernest Hives, 1st Baron Hives
Crest In front of a sun in splendour Or an eagle rising Proper. Escutcheon Or on a chevron Sable three bee hives of the field. Supporters Dexter the figure of a mechanic Proper overalls Azure holding in the exterior hand a micrometer sinister the figure of a draughstman Proper coat Argent holding under the exterior arm a set square and a T square also Proper. Motto (Thus You Make Honey Not For Yourselves You Denizens Of The Hives)

Peerage of the United Kingdom
New creation	Baron Hives; 1950–1965	Succeeded by John Warwick Hives
