= Clive Jenkins =

British trade union leader

David Clive Jenkins (2 May 1926 – 22 September 1999) was a British trade union leader. "Organising the middle classes", his stated recreation in Who's Who, sums up both his sense of humour and his achievements in the British trade union movement.

== Early life ==
Jenkins was born at 4, Maesycwrt Terrace, Port Talbot, Glamorgan, Wales, to David Samuel Jenkins and Miriam Harris, née Hughes. His father worked as a clerk for the Great Western Railway; the family lived in "austerity" in "a small terraced house with an outside toilet and 'no carpet, just coconut matting'"- it was only after his paternal grandfather died, leaving £40, that the family gained hot water and a bathroom, having previously shared the water used in an old zinc tub placed in front of the fire once a week. Jenkins's brother, Tom, became leader of the Transport Salaried Staffs' Association. On leaving Port Talbot County School in 1940 at the age of 14, when his father died, he started work in the laboratory at a metalworks and continued his education by taking evening classes at Swansea Technical College. Three years later, he was in charge of the lab. Two years after that, he was a night shift foreman.

== Union career ==
Jenkins had early involvement in his trade union, the Association of Scientific Workers (AScW), and become a lay official in 1944, when he was elected as secretary of his branch. In 1946, at the age of 20, he left Port Talbot to become a full-time official at the Birmingham office of the Association of Supervisory Staff, Executives and Technicians (ASSET), where he was appointed assistant divisional secretary. He was at that time a member of the Communist Party of Great Britain.

In 1951, he organised his first major national dispute, a strike at Heathrow Airport that caused British European Airways to cancel more than 800 flights.

Moving almost immediately to the head office, he received rapid promotion: as national officer in 1954, deputy general secretary in 1957, and general secretary in 1961.

Then, ASSET had 23,000 members, which later increased to 50,000 by 1969, when ASSET merged with AScW, to form ASTMS (the Association of Scientific, Technical and Managerial Staffs). ASSET and Jenkins were the senior partner. In the new union, he was joint general secretary (with John Dutton) of AScW, but by 1970, he was sole general secretary with a vision of what "his" union could become.

By the use of advertising (billboard posters were previously unheard of in the movement), he brought trades unionism to the middle classes. Within 15 years, ASTMS grew from an initial membership of 65,000 to a figure approaching 500,000.

Jenkins kept himself (and ASTMS) in the public eye, with frequent appearances on television chat shows and his own regular newspaper columns. His wit and turn of phrase ensured that even his opponents would certainly remember him.

However, his reckless behavior ensured that more professional trade union leaders kept him off the General Council of the TUC. until 1974. He became its chairman from 1987 to 1988.

== Involvement in politics ==
A Labour government, under Harold Wilson, was elected in 1974. Jenkins was then appointed to the National Research and Development Council (NRDC), from 1974 to 1980. He sat on the committee that produced the Bullock Report (Industrial democracy) (1975–1977) as well as on the board of the British National Oil Corporation (1979–1982).

During the 1975 referendum on Britain's membership of the EEC, Jenkins campaigned for Britain to leave the EEC.

Following the Labour Party's heavy defeat in the 1983 election, Jenkins was instrumental in getting Neil Kinnock nominated to the leadership of the party. In 1988, shortly after ASTMS merged with TASS (the Technical, Administrative and Supervisory Section) to form MSF (Manufacturing, Science and Finance), Jenkins unexpectedly announced his retirement. He wrote an autobiography, All Against The Collar (1990).

== Personal life ==
In 1963 Jenkins married Moira McGregor Hilley; they had a son and a daughter before their divorce in 1989.

== Retirement ==
Upon retiring, Jenkins- by then having divorced- went to Tasmania with "a beautiful girl friend" to run a hotel and restaurant, which proved "a foolish decision" as "within a year, the business and the affair collapsed" leaving him "back in London trying to pick up the threads of his life." He subsequently bought a house in the Cotswolds, but "maintained his villa in Tasmania".

== Bibliography ==
- British Airlines: a study of nationalised civil aviation (1953). Fabian Research Series, no 158. London: Victor Gollancz.
- Power at the Top: a critical survey of the nationalised industries (1959). London: MacGibbon & Kee.
- Germany’s Balance of Influence: the changing situation in NATO (1960). London: Union of Democratic Control.
- Power behind the Screen: ownership control and motivation in British commercial television (1961). London: MacGibbon & Kee.
- British Trade Unions today (1965). Oxford: Pergamon Press (with James Edward Mortimer)
- Collective bargaining: what you always wanted to know about trade unions and never dared to ask (1977). London: Routledge and Kegan Paul. ISBN 0-7100-8691-1. (with Barrie Sherman).
- Computers and the unions (1977). London: Longman. ISBN 0-582-45017-9 (with Barrie Sherman).
- White-collar unionism: the rebellious salariat (1979). London: Routledge and Kegan Paul. ISBN 0-7100-0237-8 (with Barrie Sherman).
- The collapse of work (1979). London : Eyre Methuen. ISBN 0-413-45760-5 (with Barrie Sherman).
- The leisure shock (1981). London : Eyre Methuen. ISBN 0-413-48210-3 (with Barrie Sherman).
- All against the collar: struggles of a white collar union leader (1990). London: Methuen. ISBN 0-413-39930-3

== Sources ==
- Taylor, Robert (2004). "Jenkins, (David) Clive". Oxford Dictionary of National Biography (online ed.). Oxford University Press. doi:10.1093/ref:odnb/72859. (Subscription, Wikipedia Library access or UK public library membership required.)

Trade union offices
Preceded by Harry Knight	General Secretary of the Association of Supervisory Staff, Executives and Technicians; 1961–1969	Succeeded by Position abolished
Preceded by New position	General Secretary of the Association of Scientific, Technical and Managerial Staffs; 1969–1988; With: John Dutton (1969–70)	Succeeded by Position abolished
Preceded by George Doughty	Technical, Engineering and Scientific Group representative on the General Council of the TUC; 1974–1982; With: Ken Gill	Succeeded by Council reorganised
Preceded by New position	General Secretary of the Manufacturing, Science and Finance Union; 1988 with Ken Gill	Succeeded by Ken Gill
Preceded by Fred Jarvis	President of the Trades Union Congress; 1988	Succeeded by Tony Christopher
