= M&O =

M&O may refer to:

- Mobile and Ohio Railroad in the American South
- Managers' and Overlookers' Society, a former British trade union
- Mason and Oceana Railroad in Michigan
- Management & Operation
