= John Dutton (trade unionist) =

British trade unionist

John K. Dutton (11 June 1909 – 21 April 1985) was a British trade union leader.

Dutton began his working life in a socialist bookshop. During World War II, he served with the London Fire Brigade, and became active in the Fire Brigades Union.

In 1949, Dutton began working for the Association of Scientific Workers (AScW), and two years later he was appointed the union's deputy general secretary. He was elected as general secretary of the union in 1955.

Clive Jenkins was elected as secretary of the Association of Supervisory Staffs, Executives and Technicians in 1960, and Dutton began negotiating a merger between the two unions. This was completed in 1969, forming the Association of Scientific, Technical and Managerial Staffs, with Dutton and Jenkins as joint general secretaries. Dutton retired in 1970, and became general secretary of the World Federation of Scientific Workers (WFSW). In 1985, he visited Moscow as part of his WSFW role, and died while he was there.

Trade union offices
Preceded by Ben Smith	General Secretary of the Association of Scientific Workers; 1955–1968	Succeeded by Position abolished
Preceded by New position	General Secretary of the Association of Scientific, Technical and Managerial Staffs; 1969–1970; With: Clive Jenkins	Succeeded by Clive Jenkins
