= Barbara Switzer =

Barbara Switzer (née McMinn; born 26 November 1940) is a former British trade unionist.

She grew up in Manchester, attending Chorlton Central School and Stretford Technical College, where she completed a City & Guilds certificate as an electrical technician. After an engineering apprenticeship with Metropolitan-Vickers, she became a draughtsperson, initially with GEC at Trafford Park. She joined the Association of Engineering and Shipbuilding Draughtsmen, and became increasingly involved as she campaigned for equal pay with male colleagues. Although this challenge failed, she became the first woman to serve on the union's national executive, in 1973.

In 1976, Switzer became the first female full-time divisional officer for the union, by then known as the "Technical, Administrative and Supervisory Section" (TASS). That year, she also received the Trades Union Congress (TUC) Gold Badge. In 1979, she became the union's National Organiser then, in 1983, its Deputy General Secretary, a feat described by The Times as "the first appointment to a senior union job of a woman who has risen through the ranks".

During the 1980s, Switzer was associated with the left wing of the Labour Party. She narrowly missed out on election to the women's section of the party's National Executive Committee (NEC), and from 1985 served on the management committee of the Morning Star. As such, she worked closely with the union's general secretary, Ken Gill, who was a member of the Communist Party of Great Britain.

The TASS became part of the new MSF union in 1988, with Switzer serving as one of its five assistant general secretaries. In 1990, the union appointed her to the trade union section of the Labour NEC, the first woman ever to represent the section. With Gill's retirement imminent, she stood in the election to succeed him, but was defeated 42,209 to 73,158 by the more right-wing candidate, Roger Lyons.

In 1993, Switzer joined the General Council of the Trades Union Congress, and from 1995 she additionally served as president of the Confederation of Shipbuilding and Engineering Unions. She retired from her union posts in 1997, serving on the Employment Appeal Tribunal, the National Assembly of Women and the council of the Women of the Year Lunch.

Trade union offices
Preceded by Eric Winterbottom	Deputy General Secretary of TASS; 1983–1988	Succeeded by Position abolished
