= George Doughty =

George Doughty may refer to:

- George Doughty (politician)
- George Doughty (trade unionist)
