= James Lamond =

British politician

James Alexander Lamond (29 November 1928 – 20 November 2007) was a British Labour Member of Parliament who represented Oldham East from 1970 to 1983 and then Oldham Central and Royton from 1983 until he retired at the 1992 general election.

== Biography ==
Lamond was born in Burrelton, Perthshire. His father worked for the London and North Eastern Railway. He was educated at schools in Burrelton and Coupar Angus, before becoming an apprentice draughtsman at the Hall and Company shipyard in Aberdeen in 1942, aged 14. He could not afford the fees to study naval architecture in Newcastle, and worked as a draughtsman for the North-east Scotland Regional Hospital Board.

He was an active member of the Draughtsmen's and Allied Technicians' Association (Data; later successively renamed as AUEW-Tass, MSF, Amicus and Unite). He joined the Labour party in 1950, and was elected to the council of the County of the City of Aberdeen in 1959, serving as a councillor until 1971. He became leader of the local Labour group in 1967, and served as Lord Provost and Lord Lieutenant of Aberdeen in 1970–71. After he failed to be selected for the safe Labour seat of Aberdeen North, losing out to Robert Hughes, he found favour instead in Oldham East, where he was elected in June 1970.

He was on the left wing of the Labour party, alongside Tony Benn and Eric Heffer. He opposed the plans for devolution in Scotland, voting against the Scotland Bill in 1977. Also in 1977, he was upbraided by the Speaker after making some forthright remarks about Prince Philip. Lamond supported Tony Benn in his unsuccessful bid to become the Labour party's deputy leader in 1981.

He was a vice-president of the World Peace Council, president of the British Peace Assembly, founder chairman of the British-East German Society. In the 1980s, he was criticised as an apologist of the Communist regime in the Soviet Union, particularly after he provided justifications for the Soviet invasion of Afghanistan in 1979. In a debate in the House of Commons in July 1980, the World Peace Council was criticised by Conservative Foreign Office minister Peter Blaker as a "disguised instrument of Soviet policy", a charge that Lamond rejected (although he later accepted that much of its funding did indeed come from the Soviet Union).

After constituency boundaries were redrawn for the 1983 election, he moved to the new seat of Oldham Central and Royton, selected ahead of Joel Barnett. He opposed the location of US cruise missiles and Pershing missiles in the UK in December 1983. He supported the declining textile industry in his constituency. He served on the Public Accounts Committee from 1975 to 1983, and served on the Speaker's panel from 1979 until he retired at the 1992 general election.

== Local politics again ==
Lamond returned to local politics after leaving Parliament, serving as a member of Grampian Regional Council from 1994 to 1996. He became a Deputy lieutenant of Aberdeen in 1995. He was elected to the new unitary authority Aberdeen City Council in 1995, serving alongside his wife, before both retired in May 2007. He was chairman of the Royal Aberdeen Workshops for the Blind and Disabled from 2002 to 2004.

With his wife June Wellburn in 1954, Lamond had three daughters, all of whom survived him. He suffered from pneumonia in later life.

Parliament of the United Kingdom
| Preceded by Charles Mapp | Member of Parliament for Oldham East; 1970–1983 | Constituency abolished |
| New constituency | Member of Parliament for Oldham Central and Royton; 1983–1992 | Succeeded by Bryan Davies |
Civic offices
| Preceded by Robert Lennox | Lord Provost of Aberdeen; 1970–1971 | Succeeded by John Farquharson Smith |
