= John Forrester (trade unionist) =

Scottish trade unionist (1921–1978)

John McKay Forrester (December 1921 – 4 September 1978) was a Scottish trade union official, who served on the National Executive Committee of the Labour Party.

He was born in Clydebank and attended Clydebank High School, then undertook an engineering apprenticeship. Through the apprentices' movement, he became interested in socialism, and joined the Labour Party, later becoming the chairperson of the Clydebank Constituency Labour Party. He also joined the Association of Engineering and Shipbuilding Draughtsmen (AESD). At age 24, he began working full-time for the AESD as its youngest ever official. He spent much of his career in Manchester, focusing on building up trade unionism among clerical workers in the engineering industry, while maintaining close links with manual workers.

At the 1955 United Kingdom general election, Forrester stood unsuccessfully for the Labour Party in the City of Chester. He was recognised as being on Labour's left wing. Over the next twenty years, he held a number of positions: honorary vice president of the Campaign Against Youth Unemployment; on the executive of the Chile Solidarity Campaign; member of the National Peace Council; and union delegate to the National Committee of the Anti-Apartheid Movement.

Forrester served on the National Executive of the AESD, and in 1973 he was elected deputy general secretary of Technical, Administrative and Supervisory Section (TASS), the engineering staff section of the AESD's successor, the Amalgamated Union of Engineering Workers. He was also elected to represent the union on the National Executive Committee (NEC) of the Labour Party.

On 4 September 1978, John Forrester died in West Middlesex Hospital. He was 56. The Times noted that his death would "rob the left [of the NEC] of one of its strongest supporters".

Trade union offices
Preceded by Ken Gill	Deputy General Secretary of TASS; 1973–1978	Succeeded by Eric Winterbottom
