= Technical, Administrative and Supervisory Section =

Former trade union of the United Kingdom

TASS
- Technical, Administrative and Supervisory Section
- Merged into: Manufacturing Science and Finance
- Founded: 21 May 1913
- Dissolved: 1988
- Headquarters: Onslow Hall, Richmond upon Thames
- Location: United Kingdom
- Members: 170,751 (1980)
- Publication: The Draughtsman; TASS News and Journal
- Parent organization: Amalgamated Union of Engineering Workers (1970–1985)
- Affiliations: TUC, CSEU, IMF, LMTU, Labour

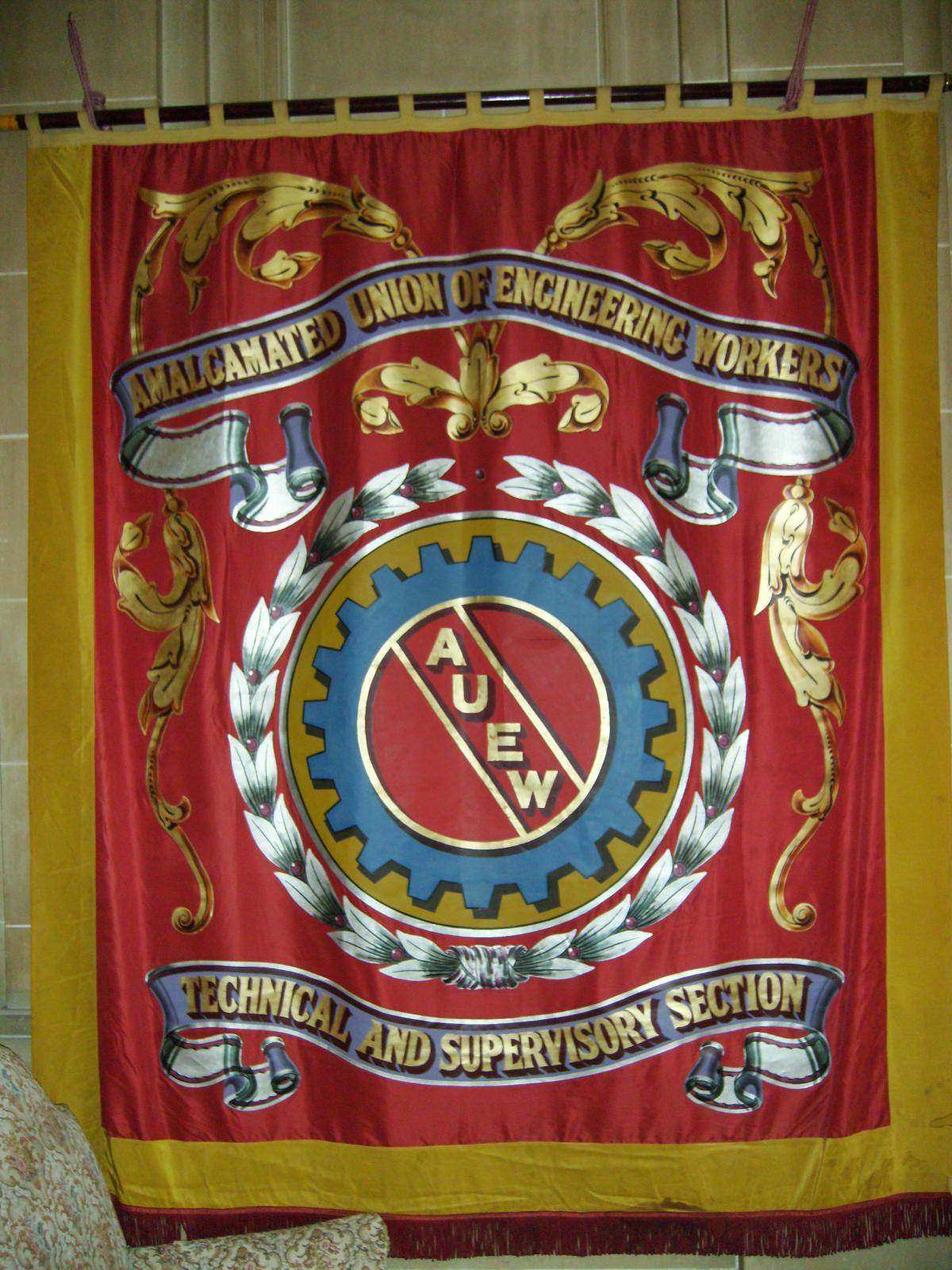
Banner of AUEW-TASS

The Technical, Administrative and Supervisory Section (TASS) was a British trade union.

== History ==
The union was founded in 1913 by 200 draughtsmen, as the Association of Engineering and Shipbuilding Draughtsmen (AESD). It expanded rapidly, and had more than 14,000 member by the end of the decade. Although it declined during the Great Depression, it retained most of its members by offering unemployment benefit, and by 1939 established a new high of 23,000 members, this rising to 44,000 by the end of World War II and over 75,000 by 1968. From 1960, it accepted technicians in ancillary roles, changing its name to the Draughtsmen's and Allied Technicians' Association (DATA).

In 1970, DATA amalgamated with the Amalgamated Union of Engineering and Foundry Workers (AUEFW) and Constructional Engineering Union (CEU) to form the Amalgamated Union of Engineering Workers (AUEW). The former members of DATA formed the Technical and Supervisory Section of the new union. At the 1973 Representative Council Conference it was agreed to rename it the Technical, Administrative and Supervisory Section (TASS).

In 1985, after considerable problems within the AUEW, TASS broke away to become an independent union.

TASS absorbed the National Union of Gold, Silver and Allied Trades (NUGSAT) in 1981, the National Union of Sheet Metal Workers, Coppersmiths, Heating and Domestic Engineers in 1983, the Association of Patternmakers and Allied Craftsmen in 1984, the Tobacco Workers' Union in 1986, and the National Society of Metal Mechanics in 1987.

In 1988, it merged with the Association of Scientific, Technical and Managerial Staffs (ASTMS) to become the Manufacturing Science and Finance Union (MSF). MSF in turn merged with the AEEU to form Amicus in 2002. This resulted in TASS and the former AUEW (by then part of the AEEU) being re-united within one union.

== Election results ==
The union sponsored Labour Party candidates in each Parliamentary election from 1950 onwards.

Election	Constituency	Candidate	Votes	Percentage	Position
1950 general election	Bristol West	Edward Bishop	12,677	30.0	2
1950 general election	South Buckinghamshire	Cyril Dee	11,389	23.9	2
1951 general election	Exeter	Edward Bishop	18,576	40.7	2
1951 general election	South Buckinghamshire	Cyril Dee	14,170	31.4	2
1955 general election	Bromsgrove	Lester George	22,287	44.8	2
1955 general election	South Gloucestershire	Edward Bishop	20,034	47.4	2
1959 general election	Glasgow Cathcart	James Jarvie	21,169	40.8	2
1959 general election	Wembley South	Edward Mackenzie	12,166	32.6	2
1964 general election	Chislehurst	Ronald Huzzard	20,736	41.2	2
1964 general election	Newark	Edward Bishop	26,171	54.4	1
1964 general election	Tynemouth	Albert Booth	25,894	43.7	2
1966 general election	Barrow-in-Furness	Albert Booth	23,485	60.3	1
1966 general election	Newark	Edward Bishop	27,402	56.7	1
1968 by-election	Bassetlaw	Joe Ashton	21,394	49.6	1
1970 general election	Barrow-in-Furness	Albert Booth	22,400	56.1	1
1970 general election	Bassetlaw	Joe Ashton	28,959	54.9	1
1970 general election	Newark	Edward Bishop	26,455	51.2	1
1970 general election	Oldham East	James Lamond	17,020	51.1	1
Feb 1974 general election	Barrow-in-Furness	Albert Booth	19,925	46.1	1
Feb 1974 general election	Bassetlaw	Joe Ashton	33,724	60.0	1
Feb 1974 general election	Newark	Edward Bishop	31,586	53.8	1
Feb 1974 general election	Oldham East	James Lamond	18,548	48.2	1
Oct 1974 general election	Barrow-in-Furness	Albert Booth	21,607	51.4	1
Oct 1974 general election	Bassetlaw	Joe Ashton	28,663	53.7	1
Oct 1974 general election	Newark	Edward Bishop	26,598	47.9	1
Oct 1974 general election	Oldham East	James Lamond	19,054	52.8	1
1979 general election	Barrow-in-Furness	Albert Booth	22,687	53.2	1
1979 general election	Bassetlaw	Joe Ashton	29,426	50.2	1
1979 general election	Dundee West	Ernie Ross	23,654	47.3	1
1979 general election	Newark	Edward Bishop	25,960	43.0	2
1979 general election	Oldham East	James Lamond	18,248	50.7	1
1983 general election	Barrow-in-Furness	Albert Booth	17,707	34.7	2
1983 general election	Bassetlaw	Joe Ashton	22,231	45.6	1
1983 general election	Chorley	Ivan Taylor	17,586	30.5	2
1983 general election	Dundee West	Ernie Ross	20,288	43.4	1
1983 general election	Oldham Central and Royton	James Lamond	18,611	41.4	1
1983 general election	Preston	Stan Thorne	21,810	46.7	1
1983 general election	Stockport	Peter R. Ward	12,731	29.0	2
1983 general election	Stockton North	Frank Cook	18,339	37.1	1
1987 general election	Bassetlaw	Joe Ashton	25,385	48.1	1
1987 general election	Dundee West	Ernie Ross	24,916	53.4	1
1987 general election	Glasgow Springburn	Michael Martin	25,617	73.6	1
1987 general election	Oldham Central and Royton	James Lamond	21,759	48.1	1
1987 general election	Stockton North	Frank Cook	26,043	49.2	1

== Leadership ==
=== General Secretaries ===
1913: L. Blair
1918: Peter Doig
1945: James Young
1952: George Doughty
1974: Ken Gill

=== Assistant General Secretaries ===
1919: David Manteklow
1920: David Manteklow and James Young
1929: Post vacant
1946: John Holland
1956: J. Dickinson

=== Deputy General Secretaries ===
1968: Ken Gill
1973: John Forrester
1979: Eric Winterbottom
1983: Barbara Switzer
