= National Council for Diplomas in Art and Design =

- Abbreviation: NCDAD
- Predecessor: Ministry of Education
- Merged into: Council for National Academic Awards (1974)
- Successor: Council for National Academic Awards
- Formation: 1961
- Type: Qualification awarding body
- Legal status: Dissolved
- Purpose: Accreditation and awarding of further education art and design diplomas
- Headquarters: Park Crescent London
- Fields: Education
- Members: 20 on Board
- Chairman: Sir John Summerson (from1961); Stuart C Mason (from August 1970)

The National Council for Diplomas in Art and Design was a UK statutory body responsible for awarding Diplomas in Art and Design undertaken in further education colleges. It operated from 1961 to 1974 when its responsibilities were merged into the Council for National Academic Awards.

== History ==
The Minister of Education had established the National Advisory Council on Art Education (NACAE) in 1958 to advise the Minister on aspects of art education within further education. The council was Chaired by Sir William Coldstream, the painter and art teacher. One of the council's remits was to establish Diploma courses that would replace the art examinations then administered by the Ministry. The Advisory Council's first report in 1960 recommended the setting up of an independent body to administer the new Diploma in Art and Design. The National Council for Diplomas in Art and Design (NCDAD) was appointed by the Minister in May 1961. The Council comprised a chairman, the architectural historian Sir John Summerson and 19 members. These included the directors and senior lecturers of major art colleges, manufacturers, editors of prestigious magazines, artists, education officers, etc.

The then existing four year Art and Design scheme was replaced by a one-year pre-diploma course (subsequently called the Foundation Course) plus a three-year Diploma in Art and Design (Dip AD). Entry to the course required five O levels – including three ‘academic’ subjects – and a minimum age of 18.

The NCDAD set up panels to visit and accredit colleges of art. Their remit was wide: they considered the curriculum and syllabus, arrangements for selecting students, standards of work, the quality and experience of staff, accommodation, equipment, amenities, arrangements for examinations, and the constitution and operation of governing bodies. In the first round of accreditation 73 colleges submitted 201 art and design courses. Of these, only 61 courses in 29 colleges were approved to run the Dip AD. The first courses started in September 1963.

A further NACAE report in 1964 recommended the provision of post Diploma studies leading to a higher Diploma in art and design. These were to be administered by the National Council for Diplomas in Art and Design. Higher Diploma courses were available from September 1966.

In 1974 the responsibilities of NCDAD were assumed by the Council for National Academic Awards. Students could therefore study for an honours and a master's degree in Art and Design.

== Other aspects ==
The records of the NCDAD are held at The National Archives (TNA) and at the Modern Records Centre (MRC). TNA holds Council minutes and reports (Reference: DB 4). The MRC at the University of Warwick holds correspondence and miscellaneous papers (Reference: NCD).
