= National Council for Technological Awards =

- Successor: Council for National Academic Awards
- Formation: July 1955
- Dissolved: 1964
- Type: Qualification awarding body
- Legal status: Dissolved
- Purpose: Accreditation and awarding of further education technological qualifications
- Headquarters: 24 Park Crescent London W1
- Location: United Kingdom
- Chairman: Baron Hives 1955-60; Sir Harold Roxbee Cox 1960-64
- Parent organization: Ministry of Education

The National Council for Technological Awards was a UK statutory body responsible for awarding Diplomas in Technology and Engineering undertaken in higher education colleges. It operated from 1955 to 1964 when its responsibilities devolved to the newly established Council for National Academic Awards.

== History ==
The National Advisory Council on Education for Industry and Commerce (NACEIC) had recommended the establishment of a body for accrediting the curriculum for technology and engineering courses, and for awarding diplomas in these subjects. The Minister for Education, Sir David Eccles, accepted the recommendations and the National Council for Technological Awards (NCTA) was established in July 1955.

The Council comprised a Governing Body and two Boards of Study. One Board was for Engineering and the other for Technology other than engineering. The Minister appointed Baron Hives, the Chairman of Rolls-Royce, as the first Chairman of the NCTA. In addition to the chairman, the Governing Body comprised five members appointed by the Minister, and three members appointed by each of the Boards of Studies. Baron Hives retired in January 1960 and was succeeded as chairman by Sir Harold Roxbee Cox.

The council was financed jointly by industry and central government.

The success of the Diploma in Technology depended on its recognition as equivalent to a degree by industry, government, professional institutions and colleges. The NCTA emphasised and ensured the very high standards required of courses for the Diploma. For accreditation a college had to provide adequate resources, high quality academic staff, a well-stocked library, and facilities for research. What distinguished the Diploma from academic degrees was the integration of industrial experience and academic education. Most courses were three years full time or four years for sandwich courses, where the student received a period of industrial/ professional training.

== Awards ==
The council was empowered to create and administer Diplomas in Technology, designated ‘Dip. Tech. (Eng.)’ for engineering and ‘Dip. Tech.’ for other technologies. The Diploma was equivalent to an honours degree. The Diploma had two honours classes, first and second class. It was intended that most students who completed a course would gain second-class honours. For those not reaching this standard a Diploma at pass level was awarded.

== Other details ==
In the year ended 31 March 1963: 927 Diplomas were awarded; there were 7,310 students, studying 117 courses at 28 colleges, and there were 350 industrial organisations providing training.

The National Council for Technological Awards had a Coat of Arms. Gules, in chief an open book proper, clasped Or, on the dexter page a representation of the atomic structure of crystal and on the sinister page a cogwheel, both sable, and in base a dexter hand couped at the wrist grasping a thunderbolt gold. The motto was: With mind and hands.

The responsibilities of NCTA were taken over by the Council for National Academic Awards when it was established in 1964.

The records of the NCTA are held at The National Archives (TNA) and at the Modern Records Centre (MRC). TNA holds Council reports, minutes and papers (Reference: DB 1). The MRC at the University of Warwick holds minutes of the Board and the Boards of Study, and records on individual institutions.
