= National Union of Scalemakers =

- Merged into: Manufacturing, Science and Finance
- Founded: 1909
- Dissolved: 1993
- Headquarters: Queensway House, 57 Livery Street, Birmingham
- Location(s): United Kingdom and Ireland
- Members: 2,500 (1949)
- Affiliations: TUC, ITUC, CSEU

The National Union of Scalemakers was a trade union representing workers involved in making weighing scales in the United Kingdom and Ireland.

== History ==
In 1909, a strike occurred among scalemakers at Messrs Hodgson and Stead, in Manchester. Following the strike, many employees decided to found a union, the Amalgamated Society of Scale Beam and Weighing Machine Makers. Initially very small, the union expanded steadily, opening branches in Liverpool and Sheffield in 1910, and expanding into Wales in 1911, Scotland in 1912, and Ireland in 1918. That year, membership reached 600, and in 1920 it peaked at 1,000. Wage reductions in the industry and poor organisation led to financial difficulties, which culminated in 1923 with the London branch splitting away.

The London branch claimed to represent the continuation of the union, and it was moderately successful, reaching 150 members by 1927. The remainder of the union struggled to survive, making its general and financial secretary post part-time, and renaming itself as the Society of Scale Beam and Weighing Machinists. It registered as a trade union in 1924 and affiliated to the Trades Union Congress (TUC), but declined to only 150 members.

The TUC was concerned about the conflict between the two unions, and brokered a merger, which took place at the start of 1928, although the union still had a membership of only 282. A ballot saw the union's headquarters move to London, and membership began increasing rapidly. In 1939, it was able to make the general and financial secretary position full-time again, and by 1949 it had a membership of 2,500.

In 1935, the union affiliated with the Scottish Trades Union Congress, with the Irish Trades Union Congress in 1945, and the Confederation of Shipbuilding and Engineering Unions in 1948. In 1938, it began describing itself as an industrial union, representing all workers connected with the scalemaking trade, and the first woman joined the union in 1941.

The union repeatedly considered merging into the Amalgamated Engineering Union, but feared that its members interests would be neglected by the much larger union. In 1993, the union merged into Manufacturing, Science and Finance.

== Leadership ==
=== General and Financial Secretary ===
1909: J. Cope
1915: J. P. Wadsworth
1924: G. Hatfield
1928: Harry Bending
1963: S. W. Parfitt
1980: A. F. Smith

=== President ===
1909: Andrew Leslie
1913: T. Richardson
1914: D. Donaldson
1918: Harry Walker
1920: J. A. Hodson
1921: J. Maxwell
1922: J. C. Turnbull
1925: J. Maxwell
1926: Andrew Leslie Jr
1928: Thomas Knight
1937: Albert Jackson
