= Make UK =

Organization

Make UK, formerly the Engineering Employers' Federation, represents manufacturers in the United Kingdom.

== Purpose ==
Make UK provides businesses with advice, guidance and support in employment law, employee relations, health, safety, climate and environment, information and research and occupational health. The original purpose of the EEF was to enable "collective action to protect individual firms and local associations, the preservation of the 'power to manage', and the maintenance of industrial peace through established procedure".

Through offices in London and Brussels, Make UK provides political representation on behalf of UK business in the engineering, manufacturing and technology-based sectors: lobbying government, MPs, regional development agencies, MEPs and European institutions.

Make UK Defence, which is part of Make UK, undertakes a similar role within the defence industry.

== History ==
EEF was formed in 1896 as the Engineering Employers' Federation and merged in 1918 with the National Employers' Federation.

The EEF functioned as a 'Union' of Employers and negotiated from this stance with trade unions, for instance "twice, in 1897-8 and 1922, the Federation organised nationwide lock-outs. Procedural agreements for the avoidance of disputes were made with the unions at the conclusion of each of these lock-outs. These agreements provided for local and national joint conferences on disputed matters".

In November 2003 the EEF rebranded itself from the 'Engineering Employers' Federation' to 'EEF The Manufacturers' Organisation'. In February 2019 EEF rebranded to Make UK.

The EEF archive is curated by Warwick University's Modern Records Centre. The archive collection also includes records from the Federated Admiralty Contractors (covering the period 1911–1965), the Bridgebuilding and Constructional Engineering Employers' Association (1921–1927), the Gas Meter Making Employers' Federation (1908–1921) and the Grimsby Engineering Employers' Association (1919–1925).
