= Alexander Morrison (judge) =

British judge (1927–2012)

Alexander John Henderson Morrison
- Born: 16 November 1927
- Died: 28 June 2012 (aged 84)
- Occupation: Judge

Alexander John Henderson Morrison (16 November 1927 – 28 June 2012) was a British judge, president of the Mental Health Review Tribunal between 1983 and 1998.

== Early life ==
The younger son of Dr Alexander Morrison of Derby, he was educated at Derby School and Emmanuel College, Cambridge, graduating BA, MA, and LLB, and then trained as a barrister at Gray's Inn, London.

== Career ==
Called to the Bar in 1951, Morrison became a member of the Midland Circuit. He was Deputy Chairman of the Derbyshire Quarter Sessions from 1964 to 1971, then regional Chairman of Industrial Tribunals, Sheffield, and a Recorder of the Crown Court from 1971 to 1980. He was a Circuit Judge from 1980 to 1998 and President of the Mental Health Review Tribunals from 1983 to 1998, when he retired.

He hit the headlines in 1995, when he said to an all white jury at Derby Crown Court "I have before me photographs of twelve Asian men, all of whom look exactly the same."

== Family ==
In 1978, Morrison married the Hon. Philippa Ann (1928–2019), younger daughter of Ernest Hives, 1st Baron Hives, CH. They had no children. He died in 2012, survived by his widow.

== Honours ==
- President of the Derbyshire Union of Golf Clubs, 1977–79
- President of the Old Derbeian Society, 1998-2000
