= Bryan Davies, Baron Davies of Oldham =

British politician (1939–2026)

The Right Honourable The Lord Davies of Oldham PC
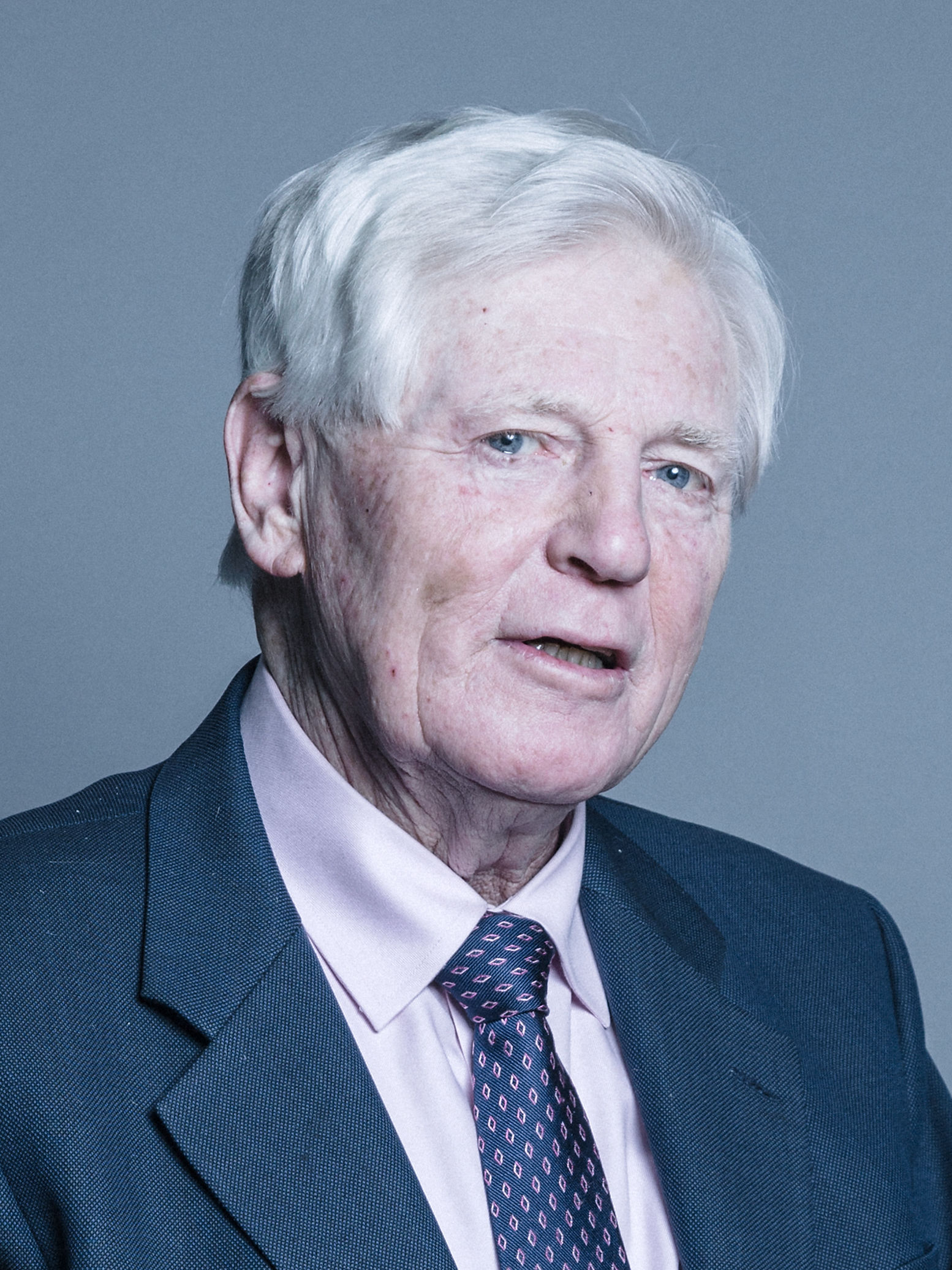
- Official portrait, 2018

Deputy Chief Whip of the House of Lords Captain of the Yeomen of the Guard
- In office 13 June 2003 – 6 May 2010
- Prime Minister: Tony Blair; Gordon Brown
- Preceded by: The Lord McIntosh of Haringey
- Succeeded by: The Lord Shutt of Greetland

Lord-in-waiting Government Whip
- In office 1 July 2000 – 13 June 2003
- Prime Minister: Tony Blair
- Preceded by: The Lord Burlison
- Succeeded by: The Lord Evans of Temple Guiting

Member of the House of Lords
- Lord Temporal
- Life peerage 3 October 1997 – 9 July 2024

Member of Parliament for Oldham Central and Royton
- In office 9 April 1992 – 8 April 1997
- Preceded by: James Lamond
- Succeeded by: constituency abolished

Member of Parliament for Enfield North
- In office 28 February 1974 – 7 April 1979
- Preceded by: constituency established
- Succeeded by: Tim Eggar

Personal details
- Born: 9 November 1939 Tredegar, Wales
- Died: 27 October 2026 (aged 86)
- Party: Labour
- Education: University College London

Bryan Davies, Baron Davies of Oldham, PC (9 November 1939 – 27 October 2026) was a British Labour politician who was a member of the House of Commons and the House of Lords. He served as Government Deputy Chief Whip in the House of Lords from 2003 to 2010, and as usual for a holder of that position, also held the position of Captain of the Yeomen of the Guard.

== Early life and education ==
Davies was born in Tredegar, Wales, on 9 November 1939. He was educated at Redditch County High School, Worcestershire, at University College London, graduating with a Bachelor of Arts in history 1961, the Institute of Education (PGCE 1962) and at the London School of Economics, graduating with a Bachelor of Science in economics in 1968.

He worked as a history teacher at The Latymer School from 1962 to 1965 and as a history and social science lecturer at Middlesex Polytechnic, Enfield from 1965 to 1974, during which time he served as a trade union official in the National Association for Teachers in Further and Higher Education (NATFHE). He was member of the Transport and General Workers Union from 1979.

== Political career ==
Davies was Member of Parliament (MP) for Enfield North from February 1974 until he lost the seat in 1979 to the Conservative Tim Eggar. Davies later served as MP for Oldham Central and Royton from 1992 until the seat was abolished by boundary changes in 1997. He was defeated for the Labour selection in the new constituency of Oldham West and Royton by Michael Meacher (then incumbent MP for the old seat of Oldham West). He had also fought Central Norfolk in 1966 and Newport West in 1983.

On 3 October 1997 Davies was created a life peer as Baron Davies of Oldham, of Broxbourne in the County of Hertfordshire.

He served as Secretary to the Parliamentary Labour Party and Shadow Cabinet from 1979 until 1992. He also served as a member of the Medical Research Council from 1977 to 1979 and chaired the Further Education Funding Council from 1998 until 2000. In 2006, he was appointed to the Privy Council.

Davies ceased to be a member of the House of Lords on 9 July 2024 under the House of Lords Reform Act 2014 because of non-attendance in the preceding session of Parliament.

== Death ==
Davies died in 27 October 2026, aged 86.

Parliament of the United Kingdom
| New constituency | Member of Parliament for Enfield North; February 1974–1979 | Succeeded by Timothy Eggar |
| Preceded by James Lamond | Member of Parliament for Oldham Central and Royton; 1992–1997 | Constituency abolished |
Political offices
| Preceded by The Lord McIntosh of Haringey | Captain of the Yeomen of the Guard; 2003–2010 | Succeeded by The Lord Shutt of Greetland |
