= Roxbee Cox, Baron Kings Norton =

British aeronautical engineer

The Right Honourable The Lord Kings Norton FEng, FIMechE, Hon FRAeS
- Born: (Harold) Roxbee Cox; 6 June 1902; Kings Norton, England
- Died: 21 December 1997 (aged 95)
- Education: Imperial College (PhD, 1926)
- Occupation: Aeronautical engineer
- Known for: Contributions to British industry, particularly aeronautical engineering, including the establishment of Cranfield University
- Spouses: Marjorie Withers (m. 1927; died 1980) Joan Pascoe (m. 1982)
- Awards: Knighthood (1953); Life peerage (1965)

Harold Roxbee Cox, Baron Kings Norton (6 June 1902 – 21 December 1997) was a British aeronautical engineer. He was notable for his contributions to British industry, particularly aeronautical engineering, and for his part in the establishment of Cranfield University.

== Life ==
Cox was the son of jeweller William John Roxbee Cox, of Handsworth, Staffordshire, and Amelia (née Stern). The statistician David Cox is a distant cousin. Born Harold Roxbee Cox, he was known as 'Roxbee' to his friends. As a child, his father took him to early air shows and air races, and his imagination was fuelled by pilots of the time such as Claude Grahame-White, B. C. Hucks and Gustav Hamel, beginning a lifelong fascination with aircraft.

Cox left Kings Norton Grammar School (now King's Norton Boys' School) at the age of 16 and joined the Aircraft Design Department of the Austin Motor Company at Longbridge, which was at that time, designing and building light aircraft such as the Whippet and Kestrel. Guided by the chief designer, he was responsible for the design of the tail unit of the single-seat Whippet. When Austin's aviation interests failed in 1920, Cox was transferred to the workshops to work with the apprentices, and worked towards an external University of London BSc, which he gained with first class honours.

In 1922 he left Longbridge for London, where he began studying for both a PhD and a DIC (Diploma of the Imperial College) at Imperial College London in the aerodynamics and instabilities of wings.

As soon as he had graduated, he joined the state-financed Airship R101 engineering team at the Royal Airship Works, Cardington.

After the R101 tragedy, the work that had been planned for the R100 was cancelled, and Cox began working on the development of aeroplanes at the Royal Aircraft Establishment at Farnborough. It was here that he contributed to aircraft safety with his studies on the problem of wing flutter and the stability of structures.

By 1936 relations between Britain and Nazi Germany were steadily deteriorating, and there was a need to prepare for a possible war. An Air Defence Department was founded at the Royal Aircraft Establishment, and Cox became its head. Much of the work carried out there was with barrage balloons. There were two aims to this research. Allied balloons needed to be able to bring down enemy aircraft, and conversely friendly aircraft needed to get through any barrages unscathed.

In 1936 the Government created the Air Registration Board (ARB), a new body that would examine civil aircraft and issue certificates of airworthiness. With his experience in air safety from the Royal Aircraft Establishment, Cox became their Chief Technical Officer in 1938.

Immediately war was declared, Cox was transferred back to Farnborough as Superintendent of Scientific Research and was then moved to the new Ministry of Aircraft Production in May 1940, as Deputy Director of Scientific Research. He dealt with a whole range of wartime projects, and was promoted to become Director of Special Projects in 1943. Cox had the special responsibility to work on jet engines. It was now Cox's job not to be the engineer, but the facilitator.

The major aircraft and engine companies had each been conducting their own research into combining gas turbines and jet propulsion, but only Group Captain Frank Whittle's jet engine design worked. However, collaboration was now more important than trade secrets, with the government encouraging any efforts that could give the Allies any edge in conflict. Cox founded, and chaired, the Gas Turbine Collaboration Committee, helping to pool ideas and experience. In 1944 the Minister of Aircraft Production, Sir Stafford Cripps, nationalised Power Jets, making Roxbee both chairman and managing director. Power Jets was restyled again in 1946 as the National Gas Turbine Establishment (NGTE) with Roxbee as its director.

In 1948 Cox moved from the National Gas Turbine Establishment to become Chief Scientist at the Ministry of Fuel and Power, where he applied his gas turbine knowledge for the benefit of power generation.

In 1954 Cox left the civil service to begin a second career in industry, and over the next twenty years he served on the boards of companies as diverse as the British Printing Corporation, the engineers Ricardo, and chemicals company Hoechst UK. He also chaired the packaging company Metal Box and the paint-makers Bergers, Jenson and Nicholson (now Berger Paints India), and was President of the Campden and Chorleywood Food Research Association for 33 years.

Playing a wider role in business, Cox was involved with a number of industry bodies. He was the Chairman of the Council for Scientific and Industrial Research, and President of both the National Council for Quality and Reliability and the Institute of Marketing. He was Chairman of the National Council for Technological Awards from 1960 until 1964 then Chairman of its successor the Council for National Academic Awards (CNAA) from its inception in 1964 until 1971. His autobiography "A Wrack Behind", was published posthumously in 1999.

== College of Aeronautics and Cranfield Institute of Technology ==
In the summer of 1943, as the vice-president of the Royal Aeronautical Society, Cox chaired two open meetings to discuss the education and training of aeronautical engineers. The Minister of Aircraft Production, Sir Stafford Cripps soon commissioned Sir Roy Fedden, a speaker at the meetings, to report on the state of aeronautical education. His 1944 report "A College of Aeronautics" was the blueprint for Cranfield. The College of Aeronautics opened in October 1946, and was truly a unique establishment. The concept of hands-on learning with access to aircraft and an airfield was completely revolutionary. In 1953, Roxbee was appointed one of three new Deputy Chairmen on the Board of Governors, and in 1962, on the death of Sir Frederick Handley Page, he became the Board's chairman. Years of negotiation followed, and university status and a royal charter were granted in 1969 with the college now officially renamed Cranfield Institute of Technology, and eventually - in 1993 - Cranfield University.

Cox was awarded a knighthood in the 1953 New Year Honours.

When Cox was honoured with a life peerage on 22 June 1965, he took the title Baron Kings Norton, of Wotton Underwood in the County of Buckinghamshire and his chosen motto, "Precision and Tolerance", was highly appropriate. He specifically intended these words to have a double meaning and they summed him up perfectly. They were to be interpreted in both their narrow engineering context, and also their broader, social context. He was a man with great skills in science. He was also a man whose success lay in his tolerance. It wasn't only that he was a good with people; he was also a diplomat. He believed that there shouldn't be divisions between disciplines: the arts and sciences, technology and management, commerce and education. It was an ethos that he lived by, successfully having careers in aviation, education and industry.

== Personal life ==
In July 1927 Cox married (Doris) Marjorie (1902–1980), eldest daughter of Ernest Edward Withers, an electrical engineer, of Northwood, Middlesex (now part of the London Borough of Hillingdon). They had two sons, Christopher (1928–2018) and Jeremy (b. 1932). He married his second wife, Joan Ruth, daughter of William George Pack, of Torquay, Devon (and formerly wife of K. A. Pascoe) in 1982. He died on 21 December 1997 at the age of 95.

== Arms ==
Coat of arms of Roxbee Cox, Baron Kings Norton
| Coronet Coronet of a Baron Crest A Rabbit sejant erect proper in front of two Sceptres in saltire each terminating in a Fleur-de-lys Or Escutcheon Azure a Chevron Or between in chief two Jet Engines palewise flames downward and in base a Balloon with Car proper Supporters On either side a Cock standing on a Rock proper Motto Precision and Tolerance |
