= Managers' and Overlookers' Society =

Former trade union of the United Kingdom

- Merged: Association of Scientific, Technical and Managerial Staffs
- Founded: 1912
- Dissolved: 1977
- Headquarters: Textile Hall, Westgate, Bradford
- Location: United Kingdom
- Members: 3,475 (1925)
- Affiliations: NAUTT, TUC

The Managers' and Overlookers' Society was a trade union in England, principally representing managers in the textile industry in Yorkshire.

The union's origins lay in three friendly societies in Bradford. The oldest, the Bradford No.1 Overlookers' Provident Society, was founded in 1827, while the Bradford No.2 Managers' and Overlookers' Society was formed in 1833, and the Bradford Overlookers' Provident Society No.3 in 1862. Nos.1 and 3 merged in 1906, and No.2 joined in 1911, becoming the Bradford and District Managers' and Overlookers' Society. In 1912, this merged with similar societies from Halifax, Keighley and Wakefield, forming the Yorkshire Managers' and Overlookers' Society; it dropped "Yorkshire" from its name in 1921.

Membership of the union was 3,475 in 1925, but gradually fell, dropping below 2,000 in 1977, and to only 1,185 in 1977, when it merged into the Association of Scientific, Technical and Managerial Staffs.

== General Secretaries ==
1912: W. J. Riley
1940s: W. H. Bannister
1962: David Kirkbright
1969: L. Smith
