= Association of Building Technicians =

Former trade union of the United Kingdom

- Merged into: Amalgamated Society of Woodworkers and Painters
- Founded: 1919
- Dissolved: 1970
- Headquarters: 5 Ashley Place, Victoria, London
- Location: United Kingdom
- Affiliations: TUC

The Association of Building Technicians (ABT) was a trade union representing architects, surveyors and related workers in the United Kingdom.

== History ==
The union was founded in 1919 as the Architects' and Surveyors' Assistants' Professional Union. In 1924, it changed its name to the Association of Architects, Surveyors and Technical Assistants, and its membership and influence increased into the 1930s, as it became associated with left-wing ideas in architecture. Its membership included some prominent members of the Communist Party of Great Britain, such as Francis Skinner and Graeme Shankland, and the union's leadership was also composed of party members.

In 1942, the union renamed itself again, this time as the Association of Building Technicians. It gradually declined in membership until 1970, when it merged with the Amalgamated Society of Woodworkers and the Amalgamated Society of Painters and Decorators, forming the Amalgamated Society of Woodworkers and Painters.

== General Secretaries ==
1936: Cleve Barr
1940s: Virginia Penn
1948: F. E. Shosbree
