= Baron Hives =

Barony in the Peerage of the United Kingdom

Baron Hives, of Duffield in the County of Derby, is a title in the Peerage of the United Kingdom. It was created 7 July 1950 for the Ernest Hives, Chairman of Rolls-Royce Ltd. As of 2010 the title is held by his grandson, the third Baron, who succeeded his uncle in 1997.

== Baron Hives (1950) ==
- Ernest Walter Hives, 1st Baron Hives (1886–1965)
- John Warwick Hives, 2nd Baron Hives (1913–1997)
- Matthew Peter Hives, 3rd Baron Hives (b. 1971)

The heir apparent is the present holder's son, the Hon. Henry Peter David Hives (born 2024).

=== Title succession chart ===
Title succession chart, Barons Hives

Ernest Hives; 1st Baron Hives; 1886–1965
John Hives; 2nd Baron Hives; 1913–1997	Flt.Off. Edward Hives; 1916–1940	Hon. Peter Hives; 1921–1974	Hon. Michael Hives; 1926–2018
Matthew Hives; 3rd Baron Hives born 1971	Robert Hives born 1953
Hon. Henry Hives born 2024	William Hives born 1977

== Arms ==
Coat of arms of Baron Hives
Crest In front of a sun in splendour Or an eagle rising Proper. Escutcheon Or on a chevron Sable three bee hives of the field. Supporters Dexter the figure of a mechanic Proper overalls Azure holding in the exterior hand a micrometer sinister the figure of a draughstman Proper coat Argent holding under the exterior arm a set square and a T square also Proper. Motto (Thus You Make Honey Not For Yourselves You Denizens Of The Hives)
