= Communication Managers' Association =

Former trade union of the United Kingdom

The Communication Managers' Association (CMA) was a trade union representing managers in the United Kingdom, principally those working for the Post Office.

The union was founded in 1952 with the merger of the Post Office Controlling Officers' Association, the London Postal Superintending Officers' Association, and the Central Telegraph Superintending Officers' Association, the three unions have co-operated since 1916 in the Federation of Post Office Supervisory Officers. Initially named the Association of Post Office Controlling Officers (APOCO), it was joined by the Postal Inspectors' Association in 1959, and in 1968 decided to rename itself as the Post Office Management Staff Association (POMA), to reflect its broader membership.

The union affiliated to the Trades Union Congress in 1966. It was also affiliated to the Federation of Post Office Unions, the National Federation of Professional Workers, and the Postal Telegraph and Telephone International. In 1981, it took its final name, the "Communication Managers' Association".

By 1982, the union had 19,500 members, and published a monthly journal, New Management. In 1998, it merged into the Manufacturing, Science and Finance union.

== General Secretaries ==
1952: L. F. Pratt

1980-1989 Robert Cowley

1980s: Terry Deegan
