= National Union of Commercial Travellers =

- Merged into: Association of Scientific, Technical and Managerial Staffs
- Founded: 1921
- Dissolved: 1970
- Headquarters: 103 Southwark Street, London
- Location: United Kingdom
- Members: 600 (1948)
- Publication: The Commercial Traveller
- Affiliations: TUC

The National Union of Commercial Travellers was a trade union representing travelling salespeople in the United Kingdom.

The union was founded in 1921 as the United Kingdom Commercial Travellers. Three years later, it had 279 members. While it remained a small organisation, the union funded a school in Pinner, the Royal Commercial Travellers School, and organised numerous social activities.

Membership of the union peaked at 600 in 1948. J. F. Denning had become general secretary the previous year, and membership steadily fell under his leadership. By 1969, it had fewer than 200 members, and so the following year, it merged into the Association of Scientific, Technical and Managerial Staffs.

== General Secretaries ==
1921: C. J. Kebbell
1941: J. F. Denning
1968: J. McCabe
