= Union of Insurance Staffs =

Former trade union of the United Kingdom

The Union of Insurance Staffs (UIS) was a trade union in the United Kingdom for workers in the insurance industry.

The union was founded in 1919 as the Guild of Insurance Officials (GIO), and had 14,551 members by 1921. Membership remained at a similar level for many years, peaking at 21,000 in 1963. The union affiliated to the Trades Union Congress and the Confederation of Insurance Trade Unions, and became the "Union of Insurance Staffs" in 1969. The following year, it merged with the Association of Scientific, Technical and Management Staffs.
