= Oldham Central and Royton =

UK Parliament constituency (1983–1997)

- Former borough constituency for the House of Commons
- Oldham Central and Royton in Greater Manchester, showing boundaries used from 1983–1997
- County: Greater Manchester

1983–1997
- Seats: One
- Created from: Heywood & Royton, Oldham East and Oldham West
- Replaced by: Oldham East and Saddleworth and Oldham West and Royton

Oldham Central and Royton was a parliamentary constituency centred on the Oldham and Royton areas in the north-west of Greater Manchester, England. It returned one Member of Parliament (MP) to the House of Commons of the Parliament of the United Kingdom.

The constituency was created for the 1983 general election, and abolished for the 1997 general election, when it was largely replaced by the new constituency of Oldham West & Royton.

== Boundaries ==
The Metropolitan Borough of Oldham wards of Alexandra, Coldhurst, Royton North, Royton South, St James's, St Mary's, St Paul's, and Waterhead.

== Members of Parliament ==
Election	Member	Party
1983	James Lamond	Labour
1992	Bryan Davies	Labour
1997	constituency abolished: see Oldham West and Royton	

== Elections ==
=== Elections in the 1980s ===
General election 1983: Oldham Central and Royton
Party	Candidate	Votes	%	±%
Labour	James Lamond	18,611	41.4	
Conservative	Joseph Farquhar	15,299	34.1	
SDP	Martin Jackson	11,022	24.5	
Majority		3,312	7.3	
Turnout		44,932	66.9	
Labour win (new seat)				

General election 1987: Oldham Central and Royton
Party	Candidate	Votes	%	±%
Labour	James Lamond	21,759	48.1	+6.7
Conservative	Joseph Farquhar	15,480	34.3	+0.2
SDP	Ann Dunn	7,956	17.6	−6.9
Majority		6,279	13.8	+6.5
Turnout		45,195	69.2	+2.3
Labour hold		Swing		

=== Elections in the 1990s ===
General election 1992: Oldham Central and Royton
Party	Candidate	Votes	%	±%
Labour	Bryan Davies	23,246	51.1	+3.0
Conservative	Patricia Morris	14,640	32.2	−2.1
Liberal Democrats	Ann Dunn	7,224	15.9	−1.7
Natural Law	Ian Dalling	403	0.9	New
Majority		8,606	18.9	+5.1
Turnout		45,513	74.2	+5.0
Labour hold		Swing	+2.5	
