= Manufacturing, Science and Finance =

Former trade union of the United Kingdom

MSF
- Manufacturing, Science and Finance
- Merged into: Amicus
- Founded: 1988
- Dissolved: 2001
- Location: United Kingdom
- Members: 604,000 (1991)
- Key people: Clive Jenkins, Ken Gill, Roger Lyons
- Affiliations: TUC, CSEU

Manufacturing, Science and Finance (or the Manufacturing, Science and Finance Union; almost exclusively known as MSF) was a trade union in Britain. Over eighty members of Parliament (primarily members of the Labour Party) were members.

== History ==
The MSF was the result of a merger in January 1988 between the Association of Scientific, Technical and Managerial Staffs (ASTMS) and the Technical, Administrative and Supervisory Section (TASS). In 1991, it had 604,000 members, but this fell to 446,000 in 1996, the most rapid decline of any major British union.

In 2001 the MSF merged with the Amalgamated Engineering and Electrical Union to form Amicus. The General Secretary of MSF from 1992 until the merger with Amicus was Roger Lyons, who continued as Joint General Secretary of Amicus's MSF section. In 2007 Amicus merged with the TGWU to form Unite.

== Amalgamations ==
Several unions amalgamated with the MSF:

- 1988: Church of England Children's Society Staff Association, Imperial Supervisors' Association, United Friendly Field Management Staff Association
- 1989: Imperial Group Staff Association
- 1990: Health Visitors' Association
- 1991: Australian Mutual Provident Society
- 1993: Hospital Physicists Association, National Union of Scalemakers
- 1994: Ceron Research Staff Association
- 1997: College of Health Care Chaplains
- 1998: Communication Managers' Association
- 1999: Britannic Supervisory Union, Corporation of London Staff Association, National Union of Insurance Workers, Neilson Staff Association
- 2000: Lloyds Registry Staff Association, Union of Textile Workers
- 2001: Leicester Housing Association Staff Association

== Leadership ==
=== General Secretaries ===
1988: Clive Jenkins and Ken Gill
1988: Ken Gill
1992: Roger Lyons

=== Assistant General Secretaries ===
1988: Roger Lyons and Barbara Switzer
1992: John Chowcat and Barbara Switzer
1997: John Chowcat
1999: Post vacant
