= Oldham East =

Parliamentary constituency in the United Kingdom, 1950–1983

- Former borough constituency for the House of Commons

1950–1983
- Seats: one
- Created from: Oldham
- Replaced by: Oldham Central & Royton and Littleborough & Saddleworth

Oldham East was a parliamentary constituency centred on the town of Oldham in the north-east of Greater Manchester. It returned one Member of Parliament (MP) to the House of Commons of the Parliament of the United Kingdom.

The constituency was created at the 1950 general election, succeeding the former two-seat Oldham constituency, and was abolished at the 1983 general election. The constituency since 1997 is Oldham East and Saddleworth (UK Parliament constituency).

== Boundaries ==
Oldham East in Lancashire, boundaries used 1974-83

1950–1955: The County Borough of Oldham wards of Clarksfield, Mumps, St James', St Mary's, St Paul's, St Peter's, and Waterhead, and the Urban District of Lees.

1955–1983: As above plus Bardsley ward.

== Members of Parliament ==
Election	Member	Party
1950	Frank Fairhurst	Labour
1951	Sir Ian Horobin	Conservative
1959	Charles Mapp	Labour
1970	James Lamond	Labour
1983	constituency abolished	

== Elections ==
=== Elections in the 1950s ===
General election 1950: Oldham East
Party	Candidate	Votes	%	±%
Labour	Frank Fairhurst	21,510	45.0	
Conservative	William H L Richmond	21,117	44.2	
Liberal	Winifred Carrodus Kirkman	5,206	10.9	
Majority		393	0.8	
Turnout		47,833	84.1	
Labour win (new seat)				

General election 1951: Oldham East
Party	Candidate	Votes	%	±%
Conservative	Ian Horobin	24,621	52.2	+8.0
Labour	James Avery Joyce	22,564	47.8	+2.8
Majority		2,057	4.4	N/A
Turnout		47,185	83.0	−1.1
Conservative gain from Labour		Swing		

General election 1955: Oldham East
Party	Candidate	Votes	%	±%
Conservative	Ian Horobin	19,185	44.1	−8.1
Labour	Charles Mapp	18,805	43.2	−2.6
Liberal	Roy Francis Leslie	5,506	12.7	New
Majority		380	0.9	−3.5
Turnout		43,496	77.7	−5.3
Conservative hold		Swing		

General election 1959: Oldham East
Party	Candidate	Votes	%	±%
Labour	Charles Mapp	19,329	44.4	+1.2
Conservative	Ian Horobin	17,499	40.2	−3.9
Liberal	Dennis I. Wrigley	6,660	15.3	+2.6
Majority		1,830	4.2	N/A
Turnout		43,488	79.8	+2.1
Labour gain from Conservative		Swing		

=== Elections in the 1960s ===
General election 1964: Oldham East
Party	Candidate	Votes	%	±%
Labour	Charles Mapp	18,112	45.4	+1.0
Conservative	Harold Nutting	14,181	35.6	−4.6
Liberal	Muriel E Burton	7,574	19.0	+3.7
Majority		3,931	9.8	+5.6
Turnout		39,867	76.8	−3.0
Labour hold		Swing		

General election 1966: Oldham East
Party	Candidate	Votes	%	±%
Labour	Charles Mapp	18,431	50.5	+5.1
Conservative	Paul Michael Beard	12,796	35.1	−0.5
Liberal	Derek E Mann	5,262	14.4	−4.6
Majority		5,635	15.4	+5.6
Turnout		36,489	72.2	−4.6
Labour hold		Swing		

=== Elections in the 1970s ===
General election 1970: Oldham East
Party	Candidate	Votes	%	±%
Labour	James Lamond	17,020	51.1	+0.6
Conservative	Hugh P Holland	16,260	48.9	+13.8
Majority		760	2.2	−13.2
Turnout		33,280	65.2	−7.0
Labour hold		Swing		

General election February 1974: Oldham East
Party	Candidate	Votes	%	±%
Labour	James Lamond	18,548	48.2	−2.9
Conservative	Leith McGrandle	12,246	31.8	−17.1
Liberal	Chris Hilyer	7,667	19.9	New
Majority		6,302	16.4	+14.2
Turnout		38,461	76.4	+11.2
Labour hold		Swing		

General election October 1974: Oldham East
Party	Candidate	Votes	%	±%
Labour	James Lamond	19,054	52.8	+4.6
Conservative	Leith McGrandle	10,917	30.2	−1.6
Liberal	Chris Hilyer	6,142	17.0	−2.9
Majority		8,137	22.6	+6.2
Turnout		36,113	71.2	−5.2
Labour hold		Swing		

General election 1979: Oldham East
Party	Candidate	Votes	%	±%
Labour	James Lamond	18,248	50.7	−2.1
Conservative	R. Walker	13,616	37.8	+7.6
Liberal	Chris Hilyer	4,149	11.5	−5.5
Majority		4,632	12.9	−9.7
Turnout		36,013	68.7	−2.5
Labour hold		Swing		
