= Connect (British trade union) =

Former trade union of the United Kingdom

- Merged into: Prospect
- Founded: 1912
- Dissolved: 1 January 2010
- Headquarters: 102–104 Sheen Road, Richmond upon Thames
- Location: United Kingdom
- Members: 20,000 (2010)
- Key people: Adrian Askew, final general secretary
- Publication: The Review
- Affiliations: TUC
- Website: www.connectuk.org

Connect was a British trade union representing workers in the communications industry.

== History ==
The union was founded in 1912 as the Society of Post Office Engineering Inspectors. In 1947, the Society of Chief Inspectors merged in, and it adopted the new name of the Society of Telecommunication Engineers. Another merger took place in 1969, when the Telecommunication Traffic Officers' Association joined, with the name changing to the Society of Post Office Engineers, and in 1975 the Telecommunications Sales Superintendents' Association merged in, and it became the Society of Post Office Executives (SPOE), by which point it had more than 20,000 members.

Around the turn of 1983, the union became the Society of Telecom Executives, then finally it became Connect in 2000.

Connect's final president was Denise McGuire, while its final general secretary was Adrian Askew. In 2010, Connect merged into Prospect, the union for managers and engineers.

== Overview ==
Certain employers formally recognised Connect, for example, companies like BT Group, O2 plc, Yell Group, Guernsey Telecoms, HP, Vodafone UK and Kingston Communications. In these companies Connect negotiates on members' behalf.

In companies where there is growing membership but no formal recognition as yet, such as T-Mobile or Energis, employees still can access union services.

== Disputes ==
Connect Members in BT undertook industrial action in 2008.

== General Secretaries ==
1960: Kenneth Glynn
1983: Simon Petch
c.1999: Adrian Askew

== Branches ==
- Connect in Vodafone Blog for Vodafone members
- Connect South Non BT - Covers Southern England outside the M25
