= International Alpine Trial =

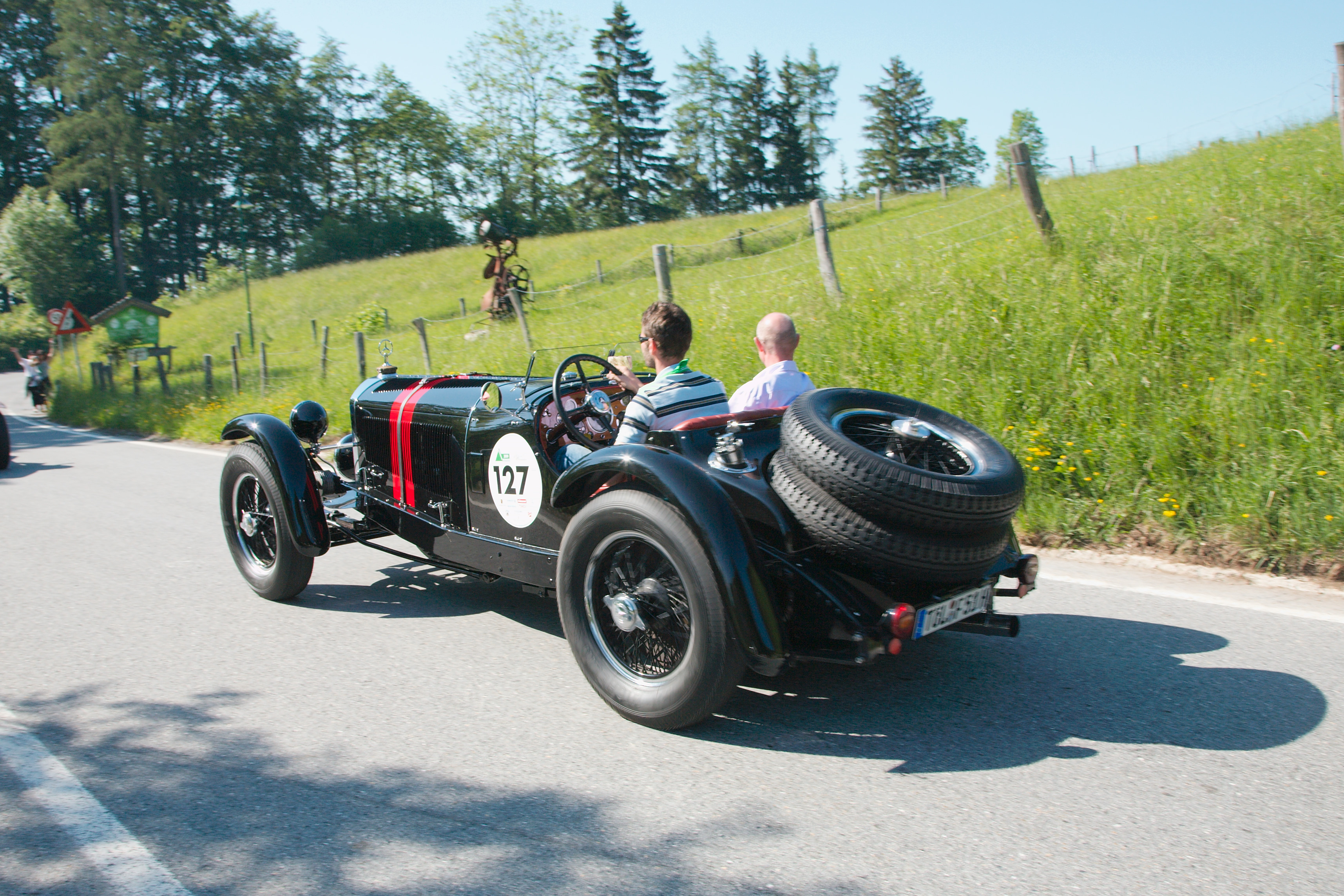
A surviving 1929 Mercedes-Benz SSK reliving the "International Alpine Trial" eighty years on Matthias Kabel, 2009

The International Alpine Trial ("Coupe Internationale des Alpes") was a "Time-Speed-Distance" motor sport rally held annually (with exceptions) between 1928 and 1936. It was one of the earliest international motorsport event of its kind and covered a distance of approximately 2,000 kilometers over an Alpine route, usually including Italy, France, Switzerland and, till 1933, Austria and Germany.

== History ==
The event took place eight times between 1928 and 1936, over seven different routes.

- No race was organised in 1930 due to the Wall Street crash in October 1929 that caused bank and business closures across Europe. Other sporting events were also cancelled in 1930.
- The 1935 event was cancelled because of the rapidly deteriorating political situation, notably between France and Italy. Mussolini's invasion of Abyssinia had led to League of Nations sanctions against Italy. On the northern side of the Alps, the German government had for its own reasons recently introduced transit and currency restrictions which made it impractical to include Germany on the route.

=== 1928 ===
Approximately 100 crews registered for the 1928 event which was held during the third week in August. Of these, 86 started from Milan and 44 crossed the finishing line in Munich after covering a notional 1,964 kilometers over 7 days. There were no prizes for drivers/crews: the four champion constructors were Adler, Brennabor, Minerva and O.M.

=== 1929 ===
36 crews arrived at the finishing post in Como without attracting penalty points, having completed a course of 2,518 kilometers. They were all rewarded with "Alpine cups". 80 teams (out of 95 who had registered) departed from Munich: 48 of these completed the course without exceeding the permitted quota of penalty points. Two "Alpine cups" were awarded to manufacturers: Hansa and BMW. Georg Kimpel, driving one of the two Mercedes-Benz SSKs won the two special hillclimbing sections – trials of pure performance – which covered the Stelvio Pass and the Pordoi Pass. The other SSK, driven by Wilhelm Merck, finished second on the Stelvio section. Second place on the Pordoi section went to Emilio Ricchetti in a Bugatti.

=== 1930 ===
No event
