= George Doughty (trade unionist) =

British trade union leader

George Henry Doughty (17 May 1911 – 25 July 1998) was a British trade union leader.

== Early life and career ==
Born in Birmingham to parents George Doughty (1884) and Selina Francis Ellis (1890), Doughty was educated at Brookfields School, Handsworth Technical School and Aston Technical College. He left school at the age of sixteen and joined the General Electric Company, where he trained as a draughtsman, and joined the Association of Engineering and Shipbuilding Draughtsmen (AESD).

== Prominent positions in the Trade Unions ==
Doughty became prominent in the AESD through his contributions at its annual conference, in particular in convincing the union to campaign for a national minimum wage for under 25-year-olds in the field. In 1946, Doughty began working full-time for the union as a divisional officer, and in 1952 he was elected as its general secretary, defeating the sitting assistant general secretary.

As leader, Doughty was associated with the union's left-wing, leading a number of strikes, with a particular focus on improving members' pay. Doughty also served on the executive of the Confederation of Shipbuilding and Engineering Unions, and as its president from 1961 to 1963, and from 1968 on the General Council of the Trades Union Congress.

Doughty negotiated a merger between the union, by then known as the Draughtsmen's and Allied Technicians' Association (DATA), and the Amalgamated Engineering Union, DATA becoming its largely autonomous Technical and Supervisory Section, and Doughty continuing as the section's general secretary.

== Retirement ==
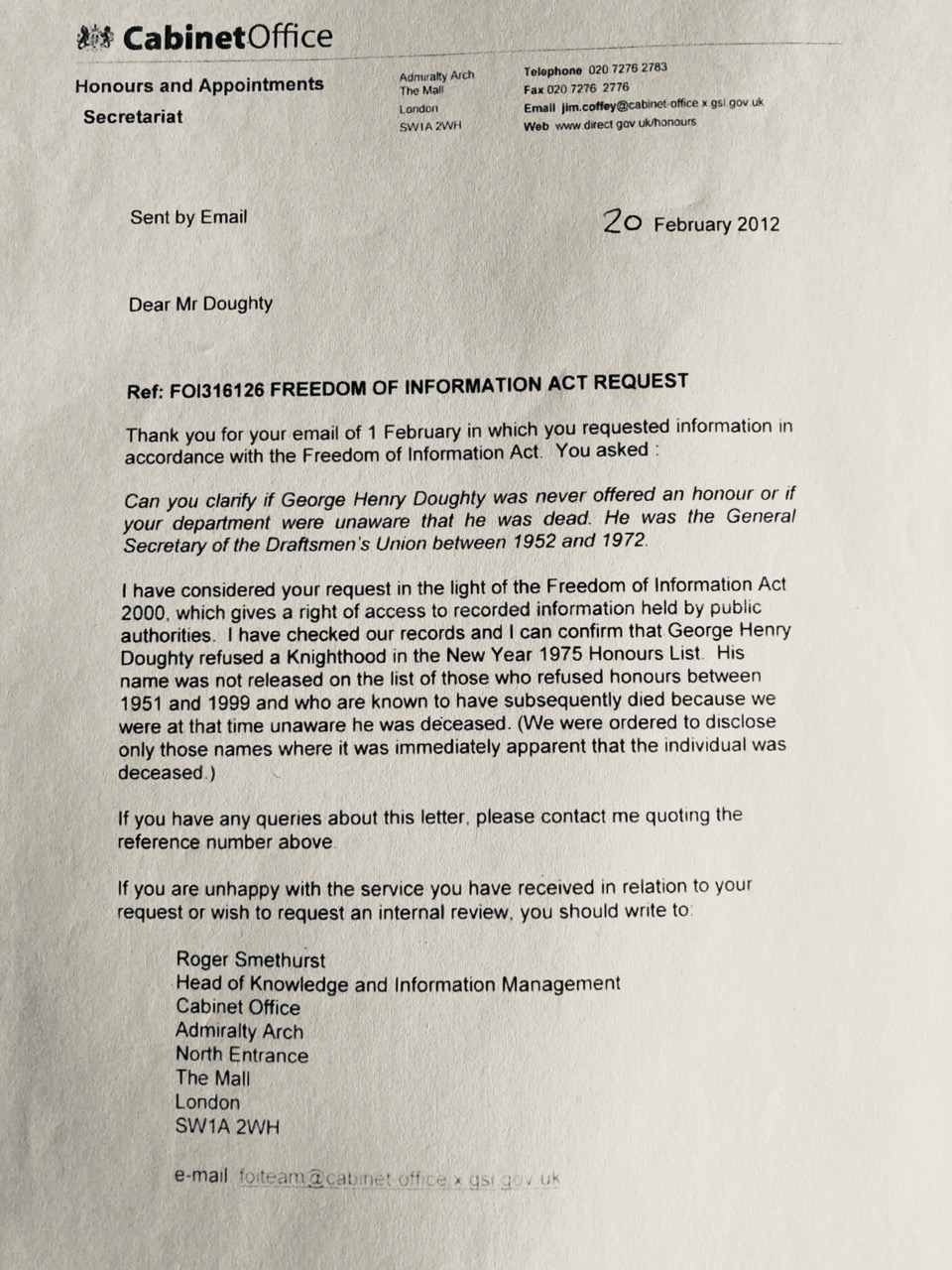
A response to a 2012 freedom of information act request confirming that Doughty declined a Knighthood (Knight Bachelor) in 1975

Doughty retired from his union posts in 1974, becoming chairman of the Economic Development Committee for Electrical Engineering, and serving on the Royal Commission on the Distribution of Income and Wealth. In this same year he was awarded a TUC gold Badge at the Brighton Congress. In 1975 he declined a Knighthood (Knight Bachelor) in the New Years Honours list.

Doughty joined the Central Arbitration Committee in 1976 and he served as the industrial relations adviser for SIAD from 1977 until 1988, when he retired completely.

== Personal life ==
Doughty married Mildred Dawson in 1941 and they later had 2 sons, Royston and Peter.

In 1979 he wrote a short book called Inventions and How to Patent Them.

Trade union offices
Preceded by James Young	General Secretary of the Draughtsmen's and Allied Technicians' Association; 1952–1974	Succeeded by Ken Gill
Preceded by Harold Poole	President of the Confederation of Shipbuilding and Engineering Unions; 1962–1963	Succeeded by John McFarlane Boyd
Preceded by New position	Technical, Engineering and Scientific Group representative on the General Council of the TUC; 1968–1974	Succeeded by Ken Gill and Clive Jenkins
