= Sign and Display Trades Union =

Former trade union of the United Kingdom

- Sign and Display Trades Union
- Merged into: National Society of Operative Printers, Graphical and Media Personnel
- Founded: 1917
- Dissolved: 1972
- Headquarters: 67 Albert Road, London
- Location: United Kingdom
- Members: 3,100 (1968)
- Affiliations: TUC, P&KTF

The Sign and Display Trades Union (SDTU) was a British trade union that existed between 1917 and 1972.

Formed in 1917 as the National Union of Sign, Glass and Ticket Writers and Kindred Trades it represented workers engaged as a sign, glass, poster or ticket writer, or in any branch of subsidiary and allied trades.

The union remained active during World War II. Between 1939-44, correspondence covered general union matters such as wage claims and holiday allowances and a Cinema Poster Trade Joint Agreement was negotiated.

In 1944, the Sign and Display Trades Union signed an agreement of mutual recognition with the National Association of Theatrical and Kine Employees (NATKE), acknowledging the demarcation between the two unions in the cinema industry.

The National Union of Sign, Glass and Ticket Writers and Kindred Trades changed its name to the Sign and Display Trades Union in 1945.

In 1949 two other unions, the Northern Glass Workers' Employees' Association and the National Society of Decorative Glass Workers of the United Kingdom, transferred their engagements to the Sign and Display Trades Union.

In 1958 the SDTU was involved in a dispute with Glasgow neon sign manufacturers; Laird Neon. Glasgow University Principal, Hector Hetherington, was appointed as arbitrator.

In 1972 the union transferred its engagements to the National Society of Operative Printers, Graphical and Media Personnel. At this point, it had fewer than 500 members.

== General Secretaries ==
1923–1938: J. G. Copeland
1937–1972: A. C. Torode
