= Ken Gill =

British trade unionist and activist

Ken Gill (30 August 1927 – 23 May 2009) was a British trade union leader. He was the General Secretary of the Technical, Administrative and Supervisory Section (TASS), from 1974 to 1988, when it merged with ASTMS to form the Manufacturing, Science and Finance Union (MSF). He was General Secretary of the MSF, 1988–1992, initially jointly with Clive Jenkins. A committed Communist, he was elected to the TUC General Council in 1974, and was a prominent figure in the militant industrial relations of the 1970s. From 1981 to 1987 he was a member of the Commission for Racial Equality.

== Background ==
Ken Gill was born in Melksham, Wiltshire, in 1927. Gill was politicised when young, having experienced poverty in his childhood during the Great Depression. He attended a grammar school and was offered officer training during the Second World War, but refused this owing to a political opposition to the officer class. In 1943, aged 15, he became an apprentice draughtsman. During the war his family took in a lodger, a cobbler and communist who convinced the young Gill of the cause of socialism. In 1945 he was a prominent campaigner for the local Labour candidate, who was elected as the first local Labour MP.

In 1949, at the end of his apprenticeship, he moved to London. As a young communist at the height of the Cold War, he travelled to East Germany for the 1951 World Youth Festival, and was briefly arrested while journeying there by the US military police. By his early thirties Gill had become a director of a successful small engineering firm.

== Trade union career ==
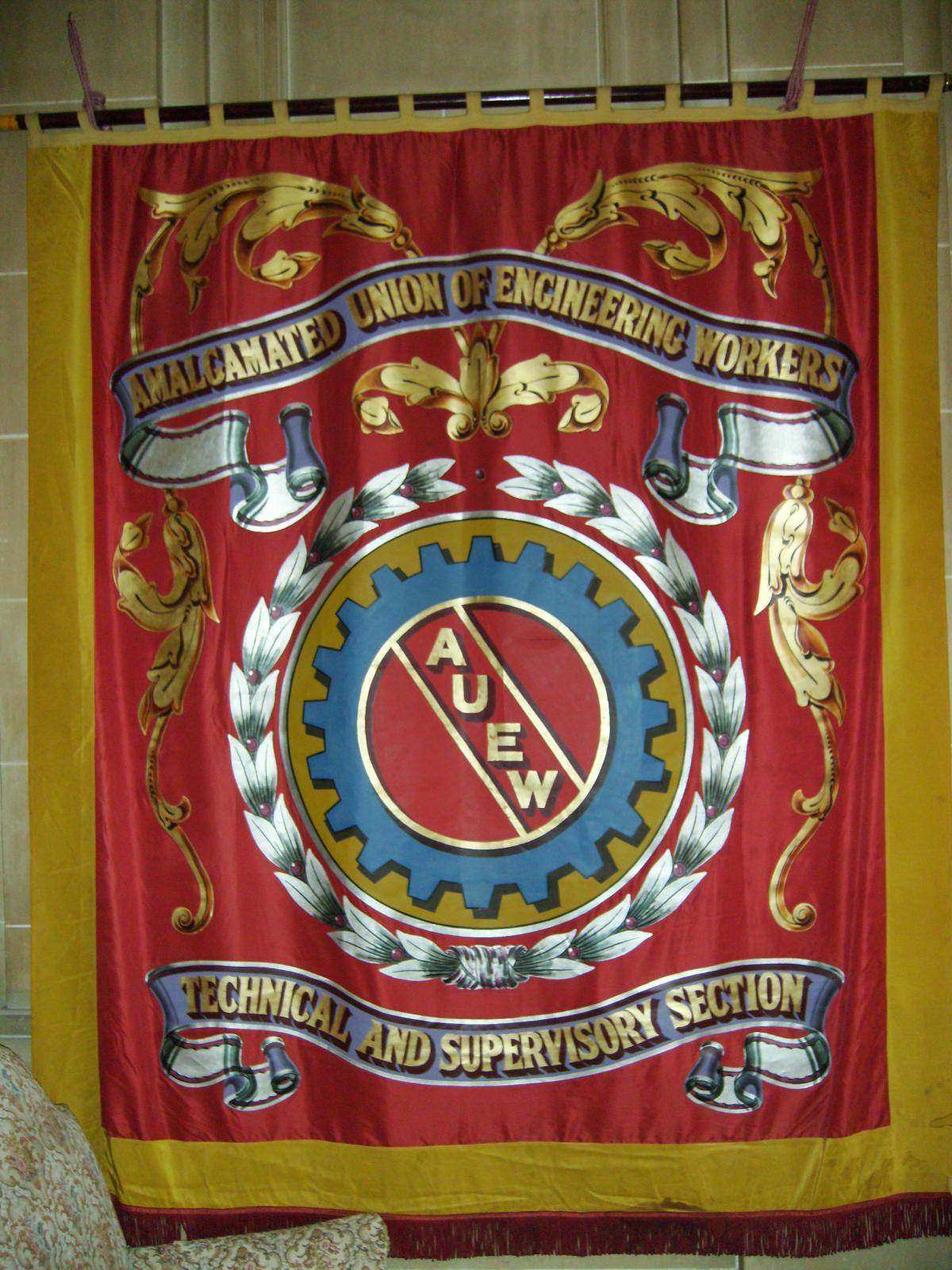
Banner of AUEW-TASS

In 1962 Gill stood for office in the Draughtsmen's and Allied Technicians' Association (DATA), being elected a regional official. The militancy of his Merseyside and Northern Ireland region saw Gill leading workers in a series of industrial battles over pay and conditions. As a result of his success in this, he was elected as deputy general secretary of the union in 1968, bringing him back to London. "As former colleagues attest, Ken was widely respected as a leader, winning people by persuasion rather than using his authority." DATA's successor, the Technical, Administrative and Supervisory Section (TASS), became part of the Amalgamated Union of Engineering Workers (AUEW) in 1971, although it remained quasi-autonomous. During the merger talks MI5 broke into Gill's South London home to bug discussions going on there.

Gill became the General Secretary of TASS in 1974, and that same year was the third communist to be elected on to the TUC General Council, with over 7 million votes. With the support of other left-wingers on the Council he helped lead a militant broad left grouping, which played a key role in the ideological and economic battles of the time. He was a leading member of the 'awkward squad' of trade union leaders which made the industrial relations of the nineteen seventies so difficult for successive governments, not least by consistently opposing an enforced incomes policy. He was a leading figure in union opposition to Barbara Castle's contentious 1969 bill on industrial relations, In Place of Strife.

From the mid-1970s Gill used his position on the TUC Council to push for more radical policies in support of equal opportunities. In 1976 he "famously told the TUC Woman's Conference ... that Britain was still a 'socially backward' country," since despite the 1975 Sex Discrimination Act women would still need a 50 per cent pay increase to achieve parity with men. In 1982 he warned against racial prejudice within trade unions, saying that black workers would form their own trade unions if prejudice prevented them from being elected to union posts. Gill was also an internationalist, pushing within the TUC for more progressive positions internationally. Gill and his union were among the earliest active supporters of the fight against South Africa's apartheid. On Gill's initiative, the union guaranteed the deposit for the 1988 stadium concert that celebrated Nelson Mandela's 70th birthday. When Mandela later visited the UK after his release from Robben Island, he chose the union's conference hall to meet and thank African National Congress exiles and activists.

In 1984 Gill became chairman of the People's Press Printing Society, the cooperative which publishes The Morning Star. Gill, along with a group of so-called "Tankie" members, was later expelled from the Communist Party of Great Britain when the paper's editor refused to follow the new Eurocommunist party line. In 1985/86 Gill became the only communist ever to become President of the Trades Union Congress, although by then, following the defeat of the 1984 miners' strike, militancy was in retreat.

TASS demerged from the AUEW in 1985, and in 1988 merged with ASTMS to form the Manufacturing, Science and Finance Union (MSF), then Britain's fifth-largest union, with 600,000 members. Gill was General Secretary of the MSF, 1988–1992, initially jointly with Clive Jenkins. Gill retired as a full-time trade union official in 1992. "Despite being among the most prominent communists in the country, Gill always saw himself first of all as a trade unionist." In 1993 he was voted the "Trade Unionists' Trade Unionist" in a survey carried out by The Observer newspaper. "Ken never fitted the cliché image of a communist. While he could be forceful and committed, he was never dogmatic or unnecessarily aggressive." He believed that the Labour Party was central to radical social change.

A lifetime supporter of the Soviet Union, he was expelled from the British Communist Party in 1985, when it broke with Moscow.

== Retirement and death ==
After his retirement, Gill continued campaigning, including against the 2003 Iraq war. He also played a key role in the 1993 founding of the Cuba Solidarity Campaign in the UK, becoming its first chair, only stepping down in 2008.

Gill was also known for his caricatures of fellow trade unionists, and often made on scraps of paper during meetings and conferences. An exhibition of his work was held at Congress House in 2007, and a book of his caricatures was published in April 2009.

Gill died on 23 May 2009, at the age of 81.

== Books ==
- Ken Gill (Author), John Green and Michal Boncza (Editors), 2009 – Hung, Drawn and Quartered, Artery Publications, ISBN 978-0-9558228-2-7. The book is a selection of Gill's caricatures.

== The Ken Gill Memorial Fund ==
A non-charitable trust was established in 2010 by Ken's family and close friends to commemorate Ken's life and to continue his life's work. Among its objectives are supporting the Morning Star newspaper, supporting the trade union movement and workers' rights through co-operation with the Institute of Employment Rights and to support solidarity with Cuba, working alongside the Cuba Solidarity Campaign. Trustees included Rodney Bickerstaffe, former general secretary of Unison, the UK's largest public services union.

Trade union offices
| Preceded by George Doughty | General Secretary of the Technical, Administrative and Supervisory Section; 1974–1988 | Succeeded by Merged with ASTMS to form MSF |
| Preceded by George Doughty | Technical, Engineering and Scientific Group representative on the General Council of the TUC; 1974–1982; With: Clive Jenkins | Succeeded by Council reorganised |
| Preceded by New position | General Secretary of the MSF; 1988–1992 with Clive Jenkins 1988 | Succeeded by Roger Lyons |
| Preceded by Jack Eccles | President of the Trades Union Congress; 1986 | Succeeded by Fred Jarvis |
| Preceded by Todd Sullivan | President of the Confederation of Shipbuilding and Engineering Unions; 1988–1989 | Succeeded by Jack Whyman |
