= Association of Scientific, Technical and Managerial Staffs =

Former trade union of the United Kingdom

ASTMS
- Association of Scientific, Technical and Managerial Staffs
- Merged into: Manufacturing, Science and Finance
- Founded: 1969
- Dissolved: 1988
- Headquarters: 10/26A Jamestown Road, London
- Location: United Kingdom
- Members: 441,000 (1977)
- Key people: Clive Jenkins
- Publication: ASTMS Journal
- Affiliations: TUC, Labour

The Association of Scientific, Technical and Managerial Staffs (ASTMS) was a British trade union which existed between 1969 and 1988.

== History ==
The ASTMS was created in 1969 when ASSET (the Association of Supervisory Staffs, Executives and Technicians) merged with the AScW (the Association of Scientific Workers) under the leadership of joint general secretaries: Clive Jenkins of ASSET and John Dutton of the AScW.

ASSET, the larger of the two unions, began as the National Foremen's Association and chiefly represented supervisors in metal working and transport. Covering both the public and private sectors, AScW largely represented laboratory and technical workers in universities, the National Health Service and in chemical and metal manufacturing. The AScW could name half-a-dozen Nobel Prize winners amongst its membership.

By the end of 1970, Clive Jenkins had become sole general secretary of the union. With advertising and personal appearances on television he kept ASTMS in the public's eye, within 15 years the union had expanded from 65,000 members to a figure approaching 500,000. This was achieved both by individual recruitment and by merging with small unions and staff associations, such as the Managers' and Overlookers' Society, Medical Practitioners' Union, the United Commercial Travellers' Association of Great Britain and Ireland, the Union of Insurance Staffs and the Prudential Assurance Staff Association. The number of mergers was eventually to exceed 30.

In 1976, trade union activist Sheila McKechnie was appointed as the full-time Health and Safety Director of ASTMS. McKechnie remained with ASTMS until her appointment as Chief Executive of the homeless charity Shelter.

In 1988, ASTMS merged with TASS (Technical, Administrative and Supervisory Section), the federated white collar section of the AUEW (Amalgamated Union of Engineering Workers) to form MSF (Manufacturing, Science and Finance). On 1 January 2002 MSF was to amalgamate with the AEEU (Amalgamated Engineering and Electrical Union, a successor to AUEW) to form Amicus.

On 1 May 2007, Amicus merged with the TGWU to form Unite, which is the second biggest trade union in the UK by membership.

== Amalgamations ==
A large number of smaller unions merged into the ASTMS:

- 1970: Medical Practitioners' Union
- 1971: Union of Insurance Staffs
- 1972: Dundee College of Technology Staff Association, Duncan of Jordanstone College of Art Staff Association
- 1973: Assurance Representatives Organisation
- 1974: Engineer Surveyors' Association, Kodak Senior Staff Association, Midland Bank Technical and Services Staff Association, National Union of Insurance Workers (London and Manchester Section), Union of Speech Therapists
- 1976: Health Service Chiropodists' Association, National Association of Liverpool Victoria Managers, Royal Society for the Prevention of Cruelty to Animals Staff Association, United Commercial Travellers' Association of Great Britain and Ireland
- 1977: Group One Staff Association, Managers' and Overlookers' Society
- 1978: Excess Insurance Group Staff Association, National Union of Insurance Workers (Pearl Federation)
- 1979: Colonial Mutual Life Assurance Society Field Staff Association, Management Association of Reckitt and Colman, National Union of Insurance Workers (Refuge Section)
- 1980: Australia and New Zealand Group Ltd London Staff Association, Britannic Assurance Chief Office Staff Association, Telephone Contract Officers' Association
- 1982: Commonwealth and Overseas Service Employees Staff Association
- 1983: Youth Hostels Association Staff Association
- 1985: Bank of New Zealand London Staff Association, Clerical and Secretarial Staffs Association of the University of Liverpool, Grindlays Staff Association
- 1986: Sun Alliance and London Staff Association

== Leadership ==
=== General Secretaries ===
1969: John Dutton and Clive Jenkins
1970: Clive Jenkins

=== Presidents ===
1969: Ian Mikardo
1973: Len Wells
1977: Doug Hoyle
1981: Len Wells
1985: Doug Hoyle
