= Association of Scientific Workers =

Former trade union of the United Kingdom

- Merged into: Association of Scientific, Technical and Managerial Staffs
- Founded: 1918
- Dissolved: 1969
- Headquarters: 15 Half Moon Street, London
- Location: United Kingdom
- Publication: Association of Scientific Workers Journal
- Affiliations: WFSW, ITUC

The Association of Scientific Workers (AScW) was a trade union in the United Kingdom. It was founded as the National Union of Scientific Workers in 1918, changing its name to the Association of Scientific Workers in 1927.

The union largely represented laboratory and technical workers in universities, the National Health Service and in chemical and metal manufacturing. It was the union for scientists with a conscience, and could name half-a-dozen Nobel Prize winners amongst its membership. The former Prime Minister of the United Kingdom Margaret Thatcher was also a member.

In 1969 AScW merged with the ASSET (Association of Supervisory Staff, Executives and Technicians) to form ASTMS (the Association of Scientific, Technical and Managerial Staffs)

== General Secretaries ==
1918: Norman Campbell
1920: Archibald Church
1931:
1935: William Alfred Wooster
1945: Roy Innes
1949: Ted Ainley
1951: Ben Smith
1954: John Dutton

== Literature ==
- Roy MacLeod, Kay MacLeod: The Contradictions of Professionalism: Scientists, Trade Unionism and the First World War, in: Social Studies of Science, Vol. 9, No. 1, European Issue (Feb., 1979), pp. 1–32
