= Association of Supervisory Staffs, Executives and Technicians =

Former trade union of the United Kingdom

- Merged into: Association of Scientific, Technical and Managerial Staffs
- Founded: 1917
- Dissolved: 1969
- Headquarters: 2-4 Homerton High Street, London
- Location: United Kingdom
- Members: 50,435 (1967)
- Key people: Clive Jenkins (Gen Sec)
- Publication: Asset
- Affiliations: TUC, Labour

The Association of Supervisory Staffs, Executives and Technicians (ASSET), was a British trade union, chiefly representing supervisors in the metal working and transport industries. It was formed from the National Foremen's Association, founded in 1918.

== History ==
In 1929 the National Foremen's Association merged with the Amalgamated Managers' and Foremen's Association, which was active in the mining industry. In 1942 the union changed its name to the Association of Supervisory Staff and Engineering Technicians and in 1946 it changed again to the Association of Supervisory Staff, Executives and Technicians.

In 1969 ASSET merged with the AScW (the Association of Scientific Workers) to form ASTMS (The Association of Scientific, Technical and Managerial Staffs).

ASSET's final General Secretary was Clive Jenkins.

== Election results ==
The union sponsored Labour Party candidates at two general elections, and both were elected.

Election	Constituency	Candidate	Votes	Percentage	Position
1964 general election	Birkenhead	Edmund Dell	23,994	57.0	1
1966 general election	Birkenhead	Edmund Dell	24,188	60.1	1
1966 general election	Feltham	Russell Kerr	22,389	54.0	1

== General Secretaries ==
1918: H. W. Reid
1939: Tom W. Agar
1945: Bob Bretherton
1946: Harry Knight
1960: Clive Jenkins
