= Awkward squad (trade unionists) =

Informal group of UK trade unionists

The awkward squad was an informal grouping of socialist trade unionists in the United Kingdom.

The group arose in the early 2000s when seven leaders of smaller trade unions who held membership of the General Council of the Trades Union Congress began meeting to discuss common positions with respect to larger unions. The group shared left-wing views and began co-operating on broader political and industrial matters, opposing what they regarded as the economically liberal policies of the ruling New Labour faction of the Labour Party. It included such figures as Bob Crow of the RMT, Mark Serwotka of the PCS and Jeremy Dear of the NUJ. The term was coined by journalist Kevin Maguire in an article in The Guardian in 2001.

The awkward squad was split between those who wish to "reclaim" the Labour Party for socialism, and those who want to break with Labour and try to build a new socialist movement. Some of the latter supported other parties, including the Scottish Socialist Party and the Respect Party. The group soon became less closely knit, with two members losing their union posts: in July 2003, Mick Rix of ASLEF was ousted by the moderate Shaun Brady, while two years later, Andy Gilchrist, a member of the "reclaim Labour" grouping, was ousted by Matt Wrack, who is more inclined towards building a new party.

In an article published in the British Journal of Industrial Relations, Andy Charlwood noted that the "awkward squad" represented a generational change of leadership in the union movement, with the union leaders who had guided the movement through the era of Thatcherism and the building of New Labour stepping down at the start of the 21st century and being replaced by a new cohort who were dissatisfied with New Labour due to a variety of factors: what they saw as New Labour's lack of guiding political principles, absence of a vision for the role of trade unions in civil society, privileging of employers and employers' organisations in policy making, adoption of a political economy which was hostile to organised labour, concerns regarding restricting public spending growth whilst investing in public services, and the failure of Labour Party leaders to provide more than rhetorical support for the strategy of industrial partnership advocated by the previous moderate generation of leaders such as John Monks, Ken Jackson and John Edmonds.

Gilchrist has said that "It's a well-known secret that many of us meet up to discuss. We'll support each other on specific issues and follow each other's lead."

However, several of leaders characterised as members of the "awkward squad" rejected the label, such as Derek Simpson, Kevin Curran (who described his views as "sensible left"), and Billy Hayes, who described the phrase as "condescending, inaccurate and unhelpful".

== Members ==
- Bob Crow (RMT)
- Kevin Curran (GMB)
- Jeremy Dear (NUJ)
- Andy Gilchrist (FBU)
- Billy Hayes (CWU)
- Paul Mackney (NATFHE)
- Dave Prentis (UNISON)
- Mick Rix (ASLEF)
- Mark Serwotka (PCS)
- Derek Simpson (Amicus)
- Tony Woodley (T&G)

Other trade union leaders associated with the group included:

- Matt Wrack (FBU)
