= Derek Simpson (trade unionist) =

British trade unionist (born 1944)

Joint-General Secretary of Unite the Union
- In office 1 July 2007 – 31 December 2010 Serving with Tony Woodley
- Preceded by: Position established
- Succeeded by: Len McCluskey

General Secretary of Amicus
- In office 1 May 2004 – 30 June 2007
- Preceded by: Roger Lyons
- Succeeded by: Position abolished

Personal details
- Born: 23 December 1944 (age 81) Sheffield, England
- Party: Labour
- Education: Open University

Derek Simpson (born 23 December 1944) is a British trade unionist who was the Joint-General Secretary of the UK's biggest private-sector trade union, Unite, from 2007 until 2010. He was previously the General Secretary of Amicus from 2002 until its merger with the Transport and General Workers' Union to form Unite in 2007.

== Early life ==
Derek Simpson was born and educated in Sheffield. He was an only child with an absent father. He attended Sheffield Central Technical School (a technical school, which transferred to the Ashleigh School in Gleadless and was then demolished having merged to become Myrtle Springs School which is now Sheffield Springs Academy).

In 1987 he received an Open University BSc in computing and mathematics. He was appointed an honorary fellow of Sheffield Hallam University in 1999.

== Career ==
From 1960 to 1966 he worked for Firth Brown Tools, then Balfour Darwin from 1966 to 1981, then working full-time as a union official.

=== AEU ===
He joined the Amalgamated Engineering Union (AEU) on becoming an apprentice at the age of 15. He became an AEU shop steward at Balfour Darwin in 1967 and held a number of increasingly senior union positions in workplaces where he was employed, learning his politics in what described as "the socialist republic of South Yorkshire". In 1981 he became a full-time union official, becoming the AEU's District Secretary for Sheffield. He was still working for the union in that city when he stood for the position of Joint General Secretary in 2002.

=== General Secretary of Amicus ===
Simpson was the surprise winner of the June 2002 election for the position of Joint General Secretary of the AEEU Section of Amicus. He beat Tony Blair's 'favourite trade unionist' – Sir Ken Jackson. He assumed the position of General Secretary in May 2004 following the departure of the MSF Section's JGS, Roger Lyons.

In the above election, Simpson was seen as the left candidate, and was backed by the broad left in the AEEU, now known as Amicus Unity Gazette. During this election campaign he appeared at fringe meetings of the Amicus MSF section conference in Blackpool, defying an instruction from Jackson not to attend. He was still identified with the Unity Gazette and appeared at their national meetings until 2008, when he helped launch a rival "Workers Uniting Group".

Simpson has repeatedly denied press claims that he was part of the "Awkward Squad" of trade union leaders opposed to New Labour policies, that they perceive to be against the interests of working people. Simpson stated that he is not in the awkward squad: "I get named as such, but it's astonishing that nobody's able to back that up with any fact".

Since becoming General Secretary, he has been supportive of the links between Amicus and the Labour Party. A member of the Communist Party of Great Britain until its disbanding in 1991, he joined the Labour Party in 1994. He was involved in the negotiation that let to the 2004 Warwick Agreement, in which the Labour Party agreed to implement some of the trade unions' policies during their third term. He favoured the early departure of Tony Blair as Labour Party Leader and Prime Minister.

=== Joint General Secretary of Unite ===
On 9 October 2008, the Executive Council of Unite decided that there would be an election for the General Secretary (Amicus section), with a timetable of January/February 2009 for the election, the results to be announced in March 2009. This election was for a fixed term until December 2010. The Executive council also postponed the merger of the union and adoption of the new rule book until May 2009.

In May 2010, during confidential negotiations with British Airways under the chairmanship of conciliation service Acas to resolve an ongoing dispute, Simpson was found to be using his BlackBerry to update his Twitter account with progress of the confidential negotiations.

== Personal life ==
Simpson met his first wife Freda when working at a greyhound track, parading the dogs and setting the traps. They married on 23 December 1967 in Sheffield. They divorced in 1974, and in 1976 Simpson married Linda Gilliver; they have two sons (born 1980 and September 1986) and a daughter (born 1982). Simpson then divorced Linda, and remarried Freda, who has two sons (born 1979 and August 1984) and a daughter (born 1977) from her previous marriage.

Non-profit organization positions
Preceded by Roger Lyons	General Secretary of Amicus; 2004–2007	Succeeded by Office abolished
Preceded by Office created	General Secretary of Unite; 2007–2010; With: Tony Woodley	Succeeded by Len McCluskey
