= ATU =

Atu may refer to:

- Atu, a character in Samoan mythology
- Atu Bosenavulagi, an Australian rules footballer
- Atu, Iran, a village in Iran
- Atu Moli, New Zealand rugby union player
- Atu'u, a village on Tutuila Island, American Samoa

ATU may refer to:

== Organizations ==
=== Universities ===
- Allameh Tabataba'i University, Iran
- Arkansas Tech University, United States
- Atlantic Technological University, Ireland

=== Other organizations ===
- African Telecommunications Union
- Amalgamated Transit Union, trade union in Canada and the US
- ATU Network, a caucus group within the Amicus trade union
- Autoridad de Transporte Urbano or Urban Transport Authority, Lima, Peru
- Anti-Terrorist Unit (Liberia)
- Lučko Anti-Terrorist Unit, Croatia
- Asian Taekwondo Union, the official governing body for Taekwondo in Asia

== Other uses ==
- Aarne–Thompson–Uther Index, a catalogue of folktale types
- Abstract Tribe Unique, rap musicians using #ATU hashtag
- Amphibious Task Unit
- Antenna tuning unit
- Autonomous territorial unit, an autonomous type of administrative division in Moldova
