= Roger Lyons =

Roger Lyons (born 14 September 1942) was the General Secretary of the MSF trade union from 1992 and re-elected leader of the union in 1997. When the union merged with the Amalgamated Engineering and Electrical Union to form Amicus in 2002 he subsequently became one of the Joint General Secretaries of Amicus.

Lyons studied for a degree in economics at University College London. His union career began in 1966 as a full-time union official for the North West England region of ASSET, one of the unions which later became ASTMS.

In 1970 he became a National Officer of ASTMS and in 1987 Assistant General Secretary. In 1988, ASTMS merged with TASS to form MSF. In 1992 Lyons became General Secretary of MSF. He was re-elected to that position in 1997 by 67% of the members voting (turnout was 12%).

Lyons was the first General Secretary of a major trade union to be removed from office by the Trades Union Certification Officer: Under the agreement to form Amicus, Lyons became Joint General Secretary of Amicus's MSF section. Amicus's other Joint General Secretary was Derek Simpson, who was responsible for the AEEU section. Lyons planned to remain as JGS of the MSF section until 2007, which would result in his being a General Secretary for seven years without re-election, as opposed to the normal legally mandated limit of five years. He and his supporters maintained that the requirement for an election was waived because he was within 5 years of retirement, but a legal challenge resulted in a ruling in May 2004 that he should "cease forthwith to hold office as Joint General Secretary of Amicus". Lyons was therefore forced to leave over two years earlier than he had originally intended. Derek Simpson thus became the sole General Secretary seven months earlier than anticipated.

After the North Sea Piper Alpha disaster in which 167 men died, Lyons gave evidence to the Cullen Inquiry, which led to new safety legislation to protect off-shore workers.

Lyons was a founder member of the Anti-Apartheid Movement and nominated Nelson Mandela for his first international honour as honorary president of University College London Union (UCLU). Lyons organised the first South African Scholarship at a British university (UCL). Lyons was an observer for the European Union in the first ever free elections in South Africa.

Lyons was President of the Trades Union Congress (TUC) from September 2003 to September 2004, after which he retired. During this time he visited Israel and Palestine in November 2003 on behalf of the TUC. Lyons is a long-standing member of the Trade Union Friends of Israel. He addressed a TUFI fringe meeting at the 2005 Congress of the TUC.

In February 2004 he took part in a fact-finding visit to Colombia organised by the group Justice for Colombia.

== See also ==
- MSF
- Amicus
- ATU Network

Trade union offices
Preceded by Ken Gill	General Secretary of the MSF; 1992–2001	Succeeded by Position abolished
Preceded by New position	General Secretary of Amicus; 2001–2004 with Ken Jackson 2001–02; Derek Simpson 2002–04	Succeeded by Derek Simpson
Preceded by Nigel de Gruchy	President of the Trades Union Congress; 2004	Succeeded by Jeannie Drake
