= Unity Gazette =

Unity Gazette is a broad left caucus group in the Amicus trade union in the United Kingdom. It includes activists from the former Manufacturing, Science and Finance (MSF) and Amalgamated Engineering and Electrical Union (AEEU) trade unions which merged to form Amicus. The broad left of AEEU was also known as Unity Gazette or Engineering Gazette. Recent mergers between Amicus and UNIFI and GPMU have resulted in new members from those unions.

Unity Gazette is often known as "the Gazette" or "the Left" by supporters and opponents alike.

Membership of Unity Gazette is open to any lay member or employee of Amicus who shares its aims, regardless of any position they may hold within the union.

Grass-roots activity of the Gazette is organised on a regional basis, each region being permitted a high degree of autonomy in how it organises its own activities. In some regions, candidates for membership must be proposed, seconded and approved by the attendees at the regional meeting, while other regions grant membership immediately on request.

National Gazette policy is decided at National Meetings, which normally take place every three months in Preston, Lancashire. At all other times the Editorial Committee are empowered to run the affairs of the national Gazette.

Activities of Unity Gazette include:

- Regular national and regional meetings to decide policy and lists of candidates, which all members are then mandated to support.
- Encouragement of members who belong to the Labour Party to stand for election to the Amicus Political Committees, which are only open to Labour Party members.
- Publicising and encouraging support for Amicus campaigns and industrial disputes.

The Gazette was instrumental in campaigning for two rule changes which were approved by the union's 2005 Policy and Rules Conference. The first introduced area committees, consisting of workplace representatives from a given geographical area. Such structures existed in the AEEU. The second, much more controversial rule change, introduced election of full-time officers rather than appointment; although an election was held for the Regional Secretary of the Yorkshire and Humberside, it is highly unlikely that any more elections of officers will take place in Amicus, and there is no provision for election of officers within the new union formed by the merger of Amicus and the Transport and General Workers' Union.

At the Unity Gazette Annual General Meeting held on 2007-03-10, members voted to support a statement of intent to merge with the TGWU Broad Left organisation at the earliest opportunity, to maximise the role of both organisations' activists in the new union.

Unity Gazette is completely self-financing, by means of members' donations.

The name Unity Gazette derives from a newspaper of the same name which had a regular print run and was circulated within AEEU workplaces. This paper was not printed for many years except as a special edition for conferences and in response to industrial disputes. In April 2006 the Unity Gazette was revived as a monthly newsletter which is available on the website and is delivered to supporters by email or post.

Another caucus group within the union, with different aims, is ATU Network. That group seeks to attract Labour-supporting members of Amicus who are sympathetic to Blairism. It is currently smaller than the Gazette, with a much lower profile. However it is believed to have opposed the Gazette's campaign for election of full-time officers.

== See also ==
- ATU Network
