= Tony Woodley, Baron Woodley =

British trade unionist

The Right Honourable The Lord Woodley
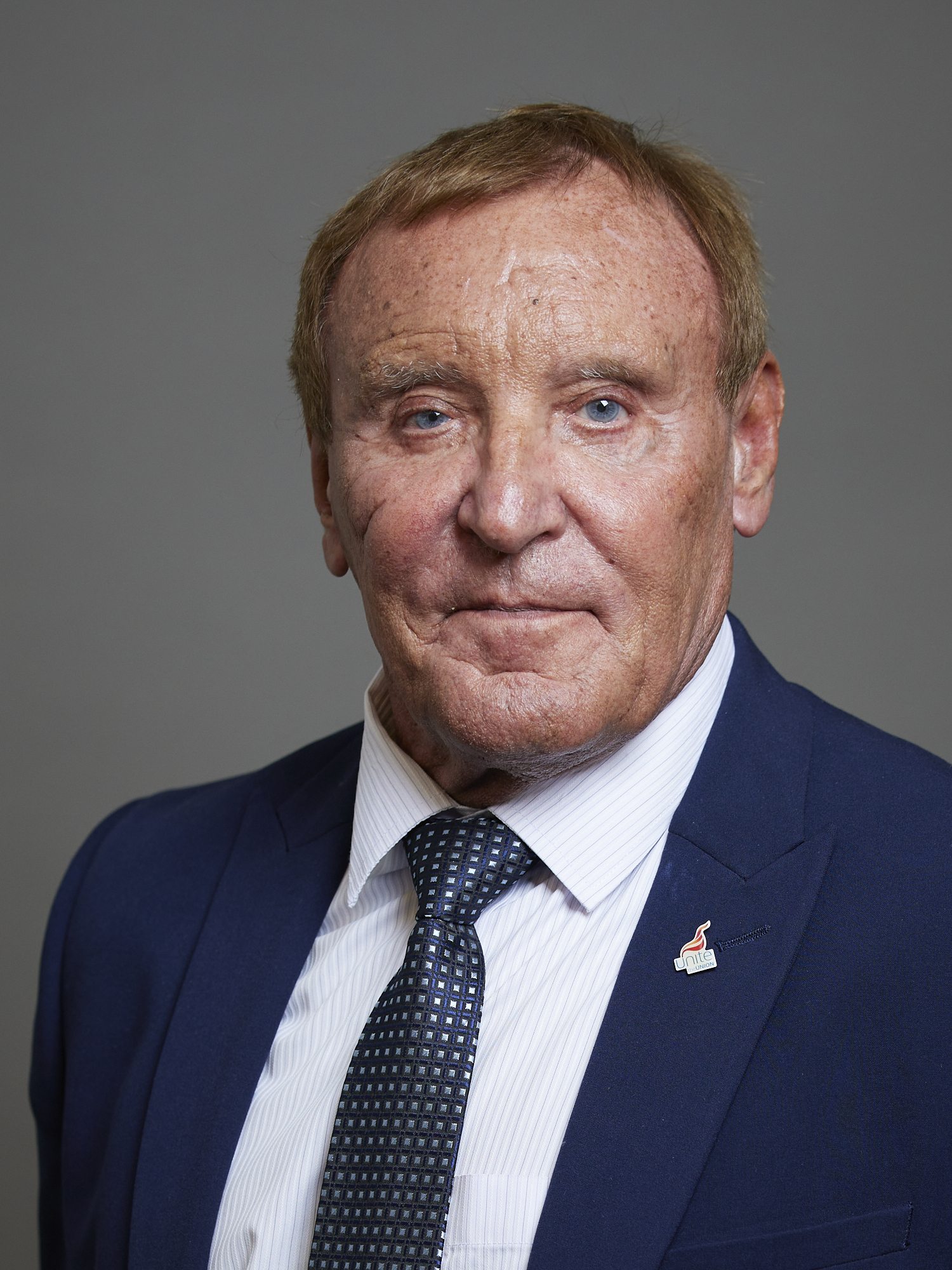
- Official portrait, 2022

Joint-General Secretary of Unite the Union
- In office 1 July 2007 – 31 January 2011 Serving with Derek Simpson
- Preceded by: Position established
- Succeeded by: Len McCluskey

General Secretary of the TGWU
- In office 1 May 2004 – 30 June 2007
- Preceded by: Bill Morris
- Succeeded by: Position abolished

Member of the House of Lords
- Lord Temporal
- Life peerage 2 November 2020

Personal details
- Born: 2 January 1948 (age 78) Wallasey, England
- Party: Labour

Anthony Woodley, Baron Woodley (born 2 January 1948) is a British trade unionist who was the Joint-General Secretary of Unite, a union formed through the merger of Amicus and the Transport and General Workers' Union, from 2007 to 2011. Despite stepping down as Joint-General Secretary, he remained as the Head of Organising for Unite until December 2013 and is still a consultant to the union. He was previously the General Secretary of the Transport and General Workers union (T&G) from 2004 to 2007.

He was created a Labour life peer in November 2020 with the title Baron Woodley, of Wallasey in the Metropolitan Borough of Wirral, after initially declining the peerage.

== Early life ==
Born in Wallasey, Cheshire (now Merseyside), he was educated at a secondary modern school on the Wirral. At the age of 15, he was taken on by the Ocean Steam Ship Company, working as a steward for four years. In 1967, he started working for Vauxhall Motors at Ellesmere Port, where he first joined the TGWU.

== Trade unionist ==
In 1980, he was elected as a full-time union convenor; his father George had also been a union convenor at the plant for the National Union of Vehicle Builders. He was also appointed as a full-time district official of the TGWU in 1989, later becoming the National Officer of the Vehicle Building and Automotive Group, and was elected as TGWU Deputy General Secretary in 2002.

=== General Secretary ===
He first came to national prominence when, on 30 May 2003, he was elected to succeed Bill Morris as General Secretary of the TGWU. He received 66,958 votes, 21,822 more than the second-placed candidate Jack Dromey, who was widely perceived as the Blairite candidate. He was considered to be a member of the so-called "Awkward Squad" of trade union leaders opposed to New Labour policies that they perceived to be against the interests of working people.

After his election he said in an interview with The Independent newspaper:

"A priority for stronger unions in the workplace must be a repeal of the anti-union laws ... British employment laws make it easier and cheaper to sack workers than on the Continent. I will campaign to stop the scandal of British workers being the cannon fodder of Europe."

He later served as one of the two Joint-General Secretaries of Unite, which was formed after a merger between the TGWU and Amicus. He stepped down from this role in January 2011.

== The Sun newspaper ==
At the 2009 Labour Party Conference, Woodley tore up a copy of The Sun newspaper as he made a speech. This was following the paper's announcement that they would be supporting the Conservative Party at the subsequent general election, having backed the winning Labour Party at the previous three elections.

On tearing up the paper, he said:

"In Liverpool, we learnt a long time ago what to do [tear the paper]. I suggest the rest of the country does the same thing."

This was a reference to The Sun's controversial reporting of the Hillsborough Disaster 20 years earlier, which had caused widespread public outrage, particularly in Liverpool, as the disaster claimed the lives of 96 Liverpool fans, who mostly lived in or near the city. Many people on Merseyside still refuse to buy the newspaper and a number of newsagents still refuse to stock it.

== Personal life ==
Woodley is also the President of Football Conference North side Vauxhall Motors F.C. despite being a childhood supporter of Everton FC. He lives in Ellesmere Port. He married Janet Timmis and they have a son (born September 1990).

Trade union offices
Preceded by Margaret Prosser	Deputy General Secretary of the Transport and General Workers' Union; 2002–2003	Succeeded by Jack Dromey
Preceded by Bill Morris	General Secretary of the Transport and General Workers' Union; 2003–2007	Succeeded by Office Abolished
Preceded by Office Created	General Secretary of Unite; 2007–2011; With: Derek Simpson	Succeeded by Len McCluskey
Orders of precedence in the United Kingdom
Preceded by The Lord Johnson of Marylebone	Gentlemen; Baron Woodley	Followed by The Lord Bellingham
