= Amicus (trade union) =

British trade union (2001–2007)

- Predecessor: MSF and AEEU
- Merged into: Unite
- Founded: January 2001
- Dissolved: 1 May 2007
- Headquarters: London, England
- Location(s): United Kingdom & Ireland
- Members: 1.2 million
- Affiliations: TUC, ICTU, STUC

Amicus was a trade union in Great Britain and Ireland, primarily representing workers in the private sector. The union was established in January 2002 by the merger of Manufacturing, Science and Finance Union and the Amalgamated Engineering and Electrical Union. Amicus was enlarged by the amalgamation of two unions, UNIFI in 2004 and the Graphical, Paper and Media Union in 2005.

Amicus was affiliated to the Trades Union Congress of England and Wales, the Irish Congress of Trade Unions and the Scottish Trades Union Congress.

On 1 May 2007, Amicus voted to merge with the Transport and General Workers' Union to form Unite the Union, which became the biggest trade union in the UK at the time. It retained that status until late 2018, when it was overtaken in membership numbers by Unison.

== History ==
Amicus was established in January 2001 by the merger of Manufacturing, Science and Finance Union (MSF) and the Amalgamated Engineering and Electrical Union (AEEU). 'Amicus' was chosen from the suggestion of Peter Skinner MEP for the name of this new union for its Latin meaning: friend, comrade (m).

With the formation of Amicus, Roger Lyons, the General Secretary of MSF, Ken Jackson, the General Secretary of the AEEU, both became Joint General Secretaries of Amicus. The AEEU section held an election in July 2002, and Sir Ken Jackson was replaced by Derek Simpson who took office in January 2003. In May 2003, Simpson became the only General Secretary following the departure of Lyons.

In late 2004 two other unions joined Amicus – UNIFI (the union for the finance industry) and the Graphical, Paper and Media Union.

== Industry representation ==
Amicus organised workers in almost every industry, predominantly in the private sector. At the 2005 TUC Congress it was reported that Amicus had 1,200,000 members of whom 266,986 were female and 933,014 male.

== Political affiliations ==
Amicus was affiliated to the Labour Party in Britain, and to the Irish Labour Party. The Amicus UK Parliamentary Group included about 120 MPs.

== Merger with the Transport and General Workers' Union ==
During 2005 discussions started between Amicus, the Transport and General Workers' Union (T&G) and the GMB regarding a merger the three unions into one, with potentially 2.5 million members covering almost every segment of the economy. On 14 June 2006 the GMB Conference voted not to continue with discussions although the other two unions pursued merger talks.

The T&G and Amicus proceeded without GMB involvement, with delegates from the two unions approving the proposed 'Instrument of Amalgamation' at a special conference on 18 December 2006. The ballot of both unions' membership during February and early March 2007, approved the merger. The result of the ballot was announced on 8 March 2007: 86.4 per cent of T&G members and 70.1 per cent of Amicus members voted to support the merger, from a turnout of 27% in both cases.

The press release announced that the resulting union had the working title "New Union" and the name would be decided by a ballot of the membership. The press release announced that the resulting union had the working title "New Union" and the name would be decided by a ballot of the membership. On 2 April 2007, The Times reported that the name Unite had been chosen. and that full merger of rule books and governing bodies may soon follow the existing merger of personnel and finance departments.

In early April 2007, the Amicus was to began discussions with a North American union, United Steelworkers (USW), about establishing a trans-atlantic union. If successful this would create an international "super union" with more than 3 million members, more able to pressure multinational companies and their managers. In 2008 these talks resulted in the creation of Workers Uniting, a union which Unite and the USW are constituent members of.

Unite was officially established on 1 May 2007. It was negotiated that both Derek Simpson, General Secretary of Amicus, and Tony Woodley General Secretary of T&G, would serve as Joint-General Secretaries of Unite until December 2010 and that Tony Woodley would serve alone until January 2012. Despite this Woodley resigned January 2011, a year earlier than planned.

== Organisation ==
The supreme decision-making body of Amicus was its Policy Conference, which convened every two years. At other times the National Executive Council, which met every two months, was responsible for governance of the union. However, the General Secretary was empowered to make executive decisions in the periods between meetings of the NEC.

Amicus had a corporate office at 35 King Street in London's Covent Garden, and its main administrative centre, Hayes Court, is at Bromley in south-east London. The union ran two of its own colleges, Esher Place at Esher in Surrey, and Quorn Grange at Loughborough in Leicestershire, and was a major user of Wortley Hall near Sheffield. A further facility, Whitehall College in Bishop's Stortford, Hertfordshire, is currently inactive, following a survey which revealed the presence of large amounts of asbestos that would be expensive to remove. For many years Amicus also owned and operated its own Technical Training Department which was based at Cudham Hall in Kent.

The union operated many other offices across Britain and Ireland to support activity in each of the union's 12 regions. The four unions forming Amicus each had a fully developed network of offices to support their own operations; there was an ongoing exercise to co-locate staff from geographically adjacent offices in order to reduce the property portfolio.

=== Sectors ===
Amicus was primarily a sector-based union. The industrial sectors were responsible for electing the majority of National Executive Committee members, and had the right to submit the majority of motions to the Policy and Rules Conferences. The remainder of NEC positions were regional and women's seats.

=== Regions ===
Amicus had 12 regions – Scotland, Wales, and the island of Ireland, together with nine English regions corresponding to the British government's then regional development agencies. Each region had a Regional Council which met every two months and was composed of about 35 delegates, elected by regional Sector, Women's, Equalities and Branch Conferences.

An Amicus region typically contained several hundred branches, each of which represent a smaller group of members, running local campaigns on their behalf and providing a means for members to socialise with one another and increase their involvement in Amicus and the wider union movement. Nationally, there were about 1900 branches. Branches were typically organised on a workplace, geographical or sectoral basis, and varied in size from a few dozen to several thousand members. One reason for the wide variation in branch size and type was that, during the numerous union mergers which culminated in the formation of Amicus, branches were often not forced to merge. For this reason many branches were still based on the structures that existed in long-disappeared unions such as TASS. Some branches were inactive, for example because the workplace they represented no longer exists. In 2005, Amicus began a consultation on reorganisation of branches, primarily intended to close inactive branches or merge them with neighbouring ones which are more active. Not surprisingly this reorganisation was of some concern to branch activists, and prompted a number of neighbouring branches to voluntarily merge in order to pre-empt any action from the centre. Other branches, for example those in the voluntary sector, were by their nature small, and made representations to the NEC and the General Secretary in which they pointed out that a small branch is not necessarily an inactive one. As of October 2006 the results of the branch consultation had not been published.

=== Elections and local control ===
The sectoral nature of Amicus contrasts with MSF where branches and regions held the majority of control and where branches were entitled to directly elect delegates to national policy and rules conferences. In Amicus, all conference delegates must be elected by a National Sector, Women's or Equalities Conference or a Regional Branch Conference.

In general, committees of the union from branch level upwards must be composed of lay members elected by the group of members they represent, as per MSF custom and practice. A notable exception is for the secretary of a regional or national committee, who is usually a Full-Time Officer employed by the union. However, within the AEEU, branches were often chaired by Officers.

In the 2002 General Secretary election, several officials of the AEEU section admitted to double-voting at different branches after a The Guardian exposure of the practice. In June 2002, The AEEU section London and south-east regional secretary, Roger Maskell, resigned following complaints by candidate Derek Simpson of tampering of computer voting records. Roger Maskell subsequently started a constructive dismissal action at an employment tribunal. In a legal statement the union's head of information systems said he was instructed by a senior official to amend voting software to allow 730,000 members to vote rather than the correct figure of 618,000, by including former members who had left the union in the preceding two years.

A rule change in 2005 provided for the establishment of Area Activist Quarterlies (also known as Area Committees) consisting of workplace representatives and branch officers from a given geographical area, to be smaller than the existing Regions. These resemble the AEEU's District Committees. The first Quarterlies took place in April 2006, and will be convened four times per year. The primary purpose of the Quarterlies is to allow local activists to share information on local issues such as redundancies and industrial disputes, and co-ordinate local campaigns.

=== Conferences and committees ===
As a general rule any candidate for a position on a committee of the union also had to be a workplace representative, in order to retain the connection with workplaces. However, retired members could hold branch positions; until a rule change in 2005, retired members wishing to hold a position other than Branch Secretary needed the NEC's consent. A further exception was made for the equalities committees, where a committee member was expected to be in employment but did not need to be a representative.

Amicus conferences are organised on a two-yearly cycle with national Policy Conferences taking place in odd-numbered years, and sectoral, national equality and regional branch conferences being held in the intervening years. This differs with MSF and AEEU arrangements where national conferences took place on an annual basis. Similarly, Regional Councils meet every two months as opposed to monthly under MSF.

Due to the two-yearly cycle, Amicus does not have a President, because legislation requires the position to be elected annually – either by delegates to annual conference, or the entire membership. In view of the cost of a national postal ballot, the Chair of the NEC was given the role of chairing the 2005 Policy and Rules Conferences.

The only Rules Conference of Amicus took place in 2005. The next Rules Conference was planned to take place in 2009, but following the merger with the T+G it is now likely to take place in 2010, as part of the wider Unite union.

== Caucus groups ==
A variety of caucus groups exist. The Amicus Unity Gazette has broad left aims and objectives. There was an attempt to launch an "Amicus The Union Network" or ATU Network, whose political position is disputed, but this never really took off. Right of centre groups from the old MSF (MSF For Labour) and AEEU (AEEU United) still operate. Lay members and Amicus employees participate in all these caucuses.

Amicus wrote and created the role of the Trade Union Disability Champion@Work. Funded initially by a European grant under the Year of Disabled People 2003 there are now over a thousand Champions from nearly 40 trade unions operating in workplaces across the UK and Ireland.

== General Secretaries ==
2001–2002: Ken Jackson and Roger Lyons
2003–2004: Derek Simpson and Roger Lyons
2004–2007: Derek Simpson
