= People Demand Democracy =

British electoral activism group

- Purpose: Democracy activism
- Location: United Kingdom
- Methods: Civil resistance, direct action

People Demand Democracy (PDD) is a British activist group that campaigns for electoral reform, including the replacement of the House of Lords with a "permanent citizens' assembly" called the "House of Citizens" and proportional representation in elections for the House of Commons. The group is best known for a protest on 10 October 2023, in which a member of the group poured glitter onto Labour Party Leader Keir Starmer at the Labour Party Conference, and is associated with Just Stop Oil.

== Views ==
People Demand Democracy opposes the House of Lords, and has stated that it wants to replace it with a "House of Citizens," which it states would be a "permanent citizens' assembly". A statement on the PDD website reads that:

A House of Citizens will force politicians to listen to people, it dismantles their relationships with the rich, it would create meaningful change in our economy and fix inequality. It would address the climate and ecological emergency and transform our country. It would listen to scientists and communities and unearth consensus, not profit off conflict and division.

— People Demand Democracy

Furthermore, the group campaigns for proportional representation in elections, which would replace the United Kingdom's current first-past-the-post system.

== Labour Party Conference protest ==
In September 2023, the group sent open letters to both the Conservative Party and Labour Party, demanding they commit to holding "new national elections with a proportional voting system" and to "set up a House of Citizens within six months of getting into office", and that if they did not do so by 30 September, the group would "take proportionate action". The Labour letter also noted that the party's members had voted in favour of proportional representation in 2022, which had been rejected by Starmer.

At 3pm on the day of the protest, the group had only 40 followers on Twitter. On 10 October 2023, during Labour Party leader Keir Starmer's speech at the Labour Party Conference, 28 year-old Yaz Ashmawi, who wore a "People Demand Democracy" t-shirt, stormed the stage and poured glitter over Starmer. Ashmawi stated that "true democracy is citizen-led" that “politics needs an update, we demand a people’s house," and "we are in crisis - our whole future is in jeopardy.” Following the action, the protester was removed from the stage by conference security. Starmer stated directly following the incident that "if he thinks that bothers me, he doesn’t know me. Protest or power, that’s why we changed our party." Ashmawi was removed from the conference building through a rear exit by two police officers after shouting "democracy first." He was arrested on suspicion of S39 assault, breach of the peace and causing public nuisance, and was driven away from the site in a police van. Following his speech, Starmer made the decision not to walk off the stage and through the crowd, as was usually the norm for party leader speeches at the conference. The Big Issue noted that Just Stop Oil had distributed information to journalists about the group in a press release.

== See also ==
- Electoral reform in the United Kingdom
- Reform of the House of Lords
