= ATU Network =

ATU Network was a caucus group within the Amicus trade union that sought to attract members and employees of Amicus who support the Labour Party and who are sympathetic to Blairism. It announced its formation in January 2005.

The group's name probably derives from Amicus the union, the union's campaigning slogan.

The founders of ATU Network, who signed the group's founding statement, are:

- Les Bayliss, Assistant General Secretary of Amicus
- Cath Speight, a full-time officer who is Regional Secretary for Amicus's Wales Region and a member of the Labour Party's National Executive Committee
- Kevin Coyne, a full-time national officer who was then the Regional Secretary of the North West Region

ATU Network competed with the larger and more established Unity Gazette grouping. That group pursues broad left aims and objectives.

== Activities ==
ATU Network is believed to have campaigned against the rule change that introduced the requirement to elect new Full-Time Officers. That rule change was approved at the June 2005 Amicus Policy and Rules Conference, after a campaign by the Unity Gazette.

However, ATU's greatest success to date, where it emerged as a serious opponent to the Gazette, was at the North West Regional Branch Conference, held on 2006-01-21. At that conference, almost all the candidates on the ATU slate were elected. North West England was the main power-base of MSF for Labour, but the vast majority of the ATU's recommended candidates were relatively young and unknown, with many being drawn from the former UNIFI finance union, and the older activists from the MSF days were almost all absent from the slate. Apart from indicating that ATU has had some success within the finance sector, it could suggest that ATU wants to be seen to be making a clean start and to avoid being associated with the political machinations of the MSF era.

== Current status ==
The current status of ATU Network is unknown. Its domain name now points to a holding site. The election literature circulated by Kevin Coyne, when he stood for the position of Joint General Secretary (Amicus Section) in February 2009, made no mention of his role as a co-founder of the network.

== Response of the Unity Gazette ==
A number of senior Gazette members expressed the opinion that Gazette and ATU membership were mutually incompatible.

In its founding statement, the ATU Network published a tariff of membership fees for the various grades of union employees, a maximum of £10/month. However, the nominal fee for lay members of ATU is only £1/year. In contrast, Gazettee membership is free for lay members and employees alike, although the Gazette solicits voluntary donations to fund its activities. This has led some members of the Gazette to conclude that the ATU Network is, in effect, a self-preservation society for Full-Time Officers who feel threatened by the introduction of elections for officers.

== Earlier organizations ==
MSF for Labour, the equivalent group in the MSF union which merged to form Amicus, was more influential than ATU Network. Its supporters included MSF's General Secretary Roger Lyons, and several prominent members of that union's National Executive Committee, many of whom (including Lyons) have since left Amicus or are no longer active at the national level. Its most visible activity was the distribution of "crib sheets" at MSF National Conferences, advising delegates how they should vote on particular motions.

At the time of the merger to form Amicus, MSF for Labour held a meeting with its counterpart in the AEEU, known as AEEU United, to discuss forming a joint organization. However, the cooperation achieved from these discussions appears to have been limited and undoubtedly benefitted the Unity Gazette which had been more successful in uniting its own supporters from the two unions. This was borne out by results in the 2003 NEC elections were candidates on the Gazette slate did well.

During 2004, at least some of the members from MSFfL were using the name Amicus First with other members using Amicus Members 1st.

The formation of ATU Network can therefore be seen as an attempt to unite Blairite members of Amicus within one group.

== See also ==
- Amicus Unity Gazette
