= Labour Party Conference =

Annual gathering of the British Labour Party

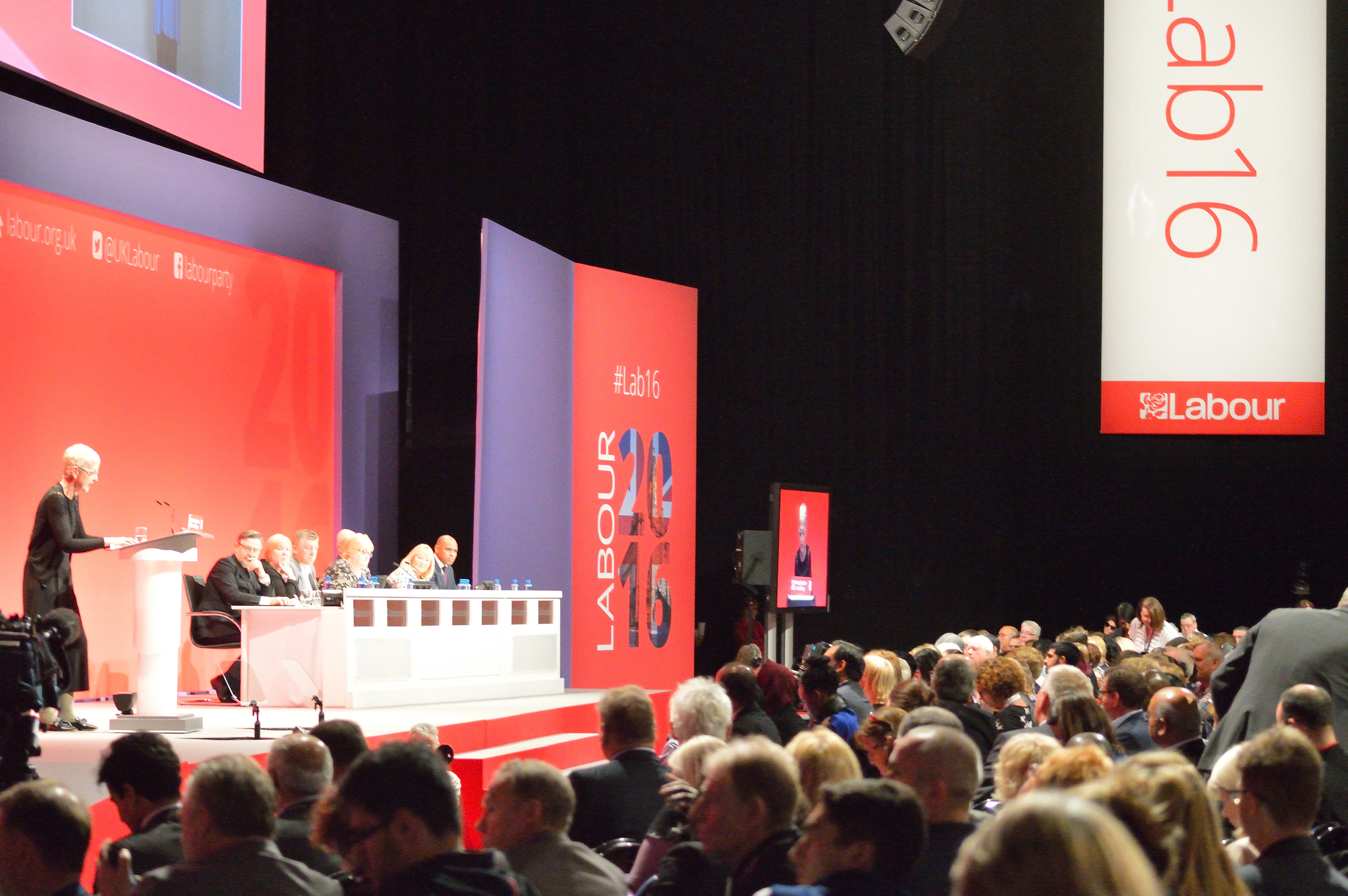
The 2016 Labour Party Conference at ACC Liverpool

The Labour Party Conference is the annual conference of the British Labour Party. It is formally the supreme decision-making body of the party and is traditionally held in the final week of September, during the party conference season when the House of Commons is in recess, after each year's second Liberal Democrat Conference and before the Conservative Party Conference. The Labour Party Conference opens on a Sunday and finishes the following Wednesday, with an address by the Deputy Leader of the Labour Party; the Leader's address is usually on the Tuesday. In contrast to the Liberal Democrat Conference, where every party member attending its Conference, either in-person or online, has the right to vote on party policy, under a one member, one vote system, or the Conservative Party Conference, which does not hold votes on party policy, at the Labour Party Conference, 50% of votes are allocated to affiliated organisations (such as trade unions), and the other 50% to Constituency Labour Parties, but all voting in both categories is restricted to nominated representatives (known as delegates). Conference decisions are not binding on the party leadership, even if carried unanimously.

== Conference ==
=== Delegates ===
Delegates to the conference are elected by Constituency Labour Parties (CLPs), affiliated trade unions and socialist societies. Currently, affiliated trade unions hold 50% of the votes at the conference, down from 80% in the era before Tony Blair. Some 40% of the votes are wielded by the three largest trade unions (Unite, GMB, Unison).

=== Resolutions ===
Resolutions for debate are put forward by CLPs and unions before the conference begins. Each CLP, Trade Union and Socialist Society may make one submission to Annual Conference, either a constitutional amendment (rule change) or a motion.

CLPs, Trade Unions and Socialist Societies may submit emergency motions for consideration for debate by the Conference Arrangements Committee on urgent matters that have arisen since the deadline for motions.

=== Role of the NEC ===
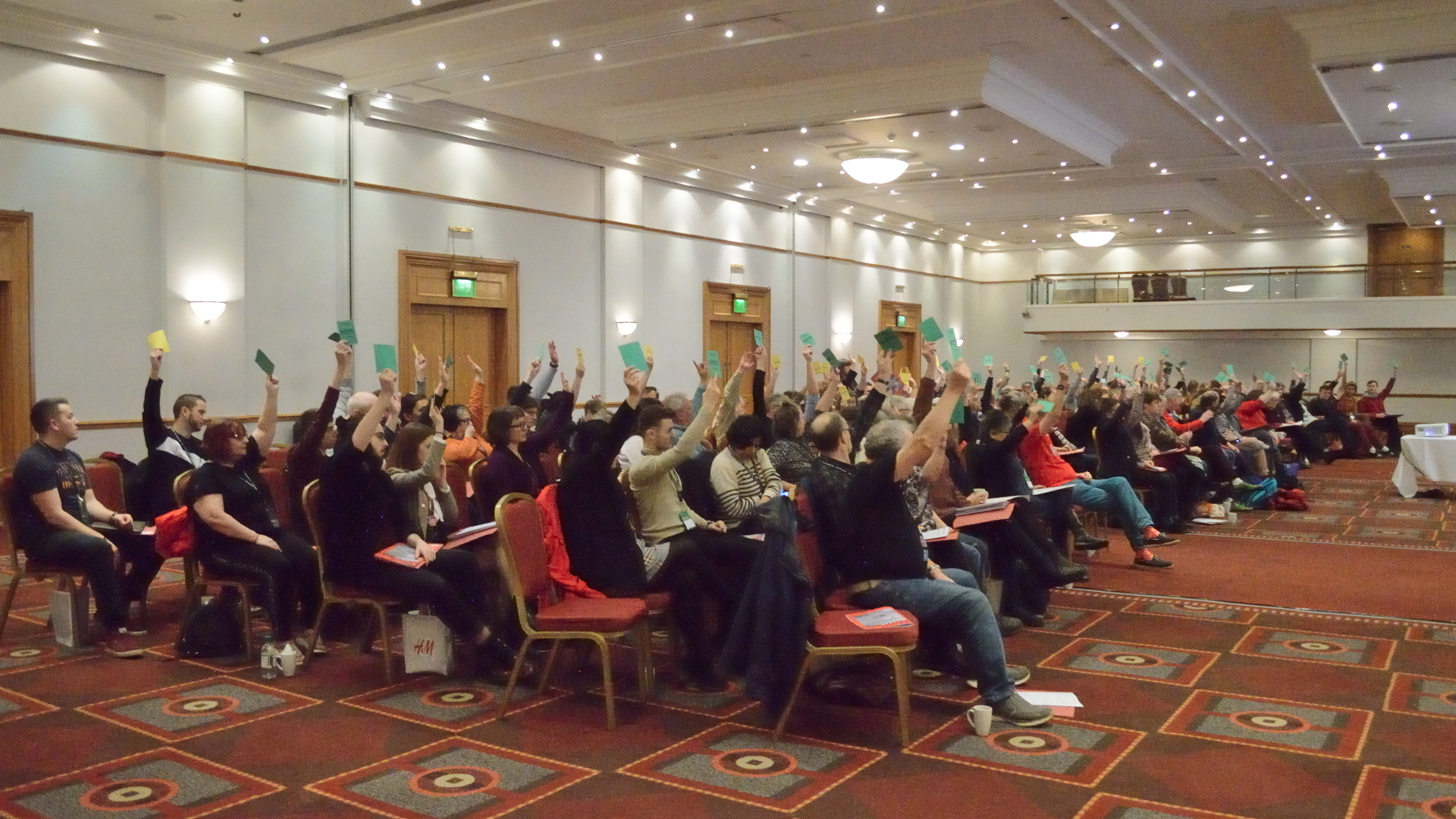
The party also has smaller Scottish, Welsh and regional conferences; the 2019 Labour South West Regional Conference shown here

The National Executive Committee leads the conference (although the details of the conference, including what is debated, are managed by the Conference Arrangements Committee) and if it does not agree with a resolution, the committee may put pressure on the backers to withdraw or remit it. Remittance means that the resolution's backers agree to "send back" the resolution to the National Executive so that it can consider the matter in more detail; this is viewed by some as a mere delaying tactic. The resolutions voted upon are normally composites, meaning that they have been compiled by combining several resolutions put forward by different bodies into a single wording agreed beforehand.

=== Conference Fringe ===
Alongside the official business of Conference, there is an extensive fringe programme. The programme consists of a range of events including seminars, debates, workshops and receptions across the conference site and the host city. These events are run by different organisations with many differing themes and topics of discussion.

== List of conferences ==
Annual conference locations (1975 to 2025)
City	Occasions
Brighton	20
Blackpool	14
Liverpool	7
Manchester	5
Bournemouth	4

=== Of the Labour Representation Committee ===
Date	Location	Chair	Ref
27–28 February 1900	London	W. C. Steadman	
1 February 1901	Manchester	John Hodge	
20–23 February 1902	Birmingham	William John Davis	
19–21 February 1903	Newcastle	Joseph Nicholas Bell	
4–5 February 1904	Bradford	John Hodge	
26–29 January 1905	Liverpool	Arthur Henderson	
15–17 February 1906	London	Arthur Henderson	

=== Of the Labour Party ===
Date	Location	Chair	Party leader	Notes	Ref
24–26 January 1907	Belfast	J. J. Stephenson	Keir Hardie		
20–22 January 1908	Hull	Walter Hudson	Keir Hardie		
27–29 January 1909	Portsmouth	J. R. Clynes	Arthur Henderson		
9–11 February 1910	Newport	Keir Hardie	Arthur Henderson		
1–3 February 1911	Leicester	William C. Robinson	George Barnes		
24–26 January 1912	Birmingham	Ben Turner	Ramsay MacDonald		
29–31 January 1913	London	George Roberts	Ramsay MacDonald		
27–30 January 1914	Glasgow	Tom Fox	Ramsay MacDonald		
1915	No conference		Ramsay MacDonald		
26–28 January 1916	Bristol	William Anderson	Arthur Henderson		
23–26 January 1917	Manchester	George Wardle	Arthur Henderson		
23–25 January 1918	Nottingham	Frank Purdy	William Adamson	Adjourned, resumed in London on 26 February.	
26–28 June 1918	London	Frank Purdy	William Adamson		
25–27 June 1919	Southport	John McGurk	William Adamson		
22–25 June 1920	Scarborough	William Harold Hutchinson	William Adamson		
1921	No conference		J. R. Clynes		
1922	No conference		J. R. Clynes		
26–29 June 1923	London	Sidney Webb	Ramsay MacDonald		
7–10 October 1924	London	Ramsay MacDonald	Ramsay MacDonald	First ever conference as governing party.	
29 September – 2 October 1925	Liverpool	Charlie Cramp	Ramsay MacDonald		
11–15 October 1926	Margate	Robert Williams	Ramsay MacDonald		
3–7 October 1927	Blackpool	Frederick Roberts	Ramsay MacDonald		
1–5 October 1928	Birmingham	George Lansbury	Ramsay MacDonald		
30 September – 4 October 1929	Brighton	Herbert Morrison	Ramsay MacDonald		
6–10 October 1930	Llandudno	Susan Lawrence	Ramsay MacDonald		
5–8 October 1931	Scarborough	Stanley Hirst	Arthur Henderson		
3–7 October 1932	Leicester	George Lathan	Arthur Henderson		
2–6 October 1933	Hastings	Joseph Compton	George Lansbury		
1–5 October 1934	Southport	Walter Smith	George Lansbury		
30 September – 4 October 1935	Brighton	William Albert Robinson	George Lansbury		
5–9 October 1936	Edinburgh	Jennie Adamson	Clement Attlee		
4–8 October 1937	Bournemouth	Hugh Dalton	Clement Attlee		
1938	No conference		Clement Attlee		
29 May – 2 June 1939	Southport	George Dallas	Clement Attlee		
13–16 May 1940	Bournemouth	Barbara Ayrton-Gould	Clement Attlee		
2–4 June 1941	London	James Walker	Clement Attlee		
25–28 May 1942	London	Walter Green	Clement Attlee		
14–18 June 1943	London	Alfred Dobbs	Clement Attlee		
11–15 December 1944	London	George Ridley	Clement Attlee		
21–25 May 1945	Blackpool	Ellen Wilkinson	Clement Attlee		
10–14 June 1946	Bournemouth	Harold Laski	Clement Attlee		
26–30 May 1947	Margate	Philip Noel-Baker	Clement Attlee		
17–21 May 1948	Scarborough	Manny Shinwell	Clement Attlee		
6–10 June 1949	Blackpool	Jim Griffiths	Clement Attlee		
2–6 October 1950	Margate	Sam Watson	Clement Attlee		
1–3 October 1951	Scarborough	Alice Bacon	Clement Attlee		
29 September – 3 October 1952	Morecambe	Harry Earnshaw	Clement Attlee		
28 September – 2 October 1953	Margate	Arthur Greenwood	Clement Attlee		
27 September – 1 October 1954	Scarborough	Wilfrid Burke	Clement Attlee		
10–14 October 1955	Margate	Edith Summerskill	Clement Attlee		
1–5 October 1956	Blackpool	Edwin Gooch	Hugh Gaitskell		
30 September – 4 October 1957	Brighton	Peggy Herbison	Hugh Gaitskell		
29 September – 3 October 1958	Scarborough	Tom Driberg	Hugh Gaitskell		
28–29 November 1959	Blackpool	Barbara Castle	Hugh Gaitskell		
3–7 October 1960	Scarborough	George Brinham	Hugh Gaitskell		
2–6 October 1961	Blackpool	Richard Crossman	Hugh Gaitskell		
2–5 October 1962	Brighton	Harold Wilson	Hugh Gaitskell		
30 September – 4 October 1963	Scarborough	Dai Davies	Harold Wilson		
12–13 December 1964	Brighton	Tony Greenwood	Harold Wilson		
27 September – October 1965	Blackpool	Ray Gunter	Harold Wilson		
3–7 October 1966	Brighton	Walter Padley	Harold Wilson		
2–6 October 1967	Scarborough	John Boyd	Harold Wilson		
30 September – 4 October 1968	Blackpool	Jennie Lee	Harold Wilson		
29 September – 3 October 1969	Brighton	Eirene White	Harold Wilson		
28 September – 2 October 1970	Blackpool	Arthur Skeffington	Harold Wilson		
4–8 October 1971	Brighton	Ian Mikardo	Harold Wilson		
2–6 October 1972	Blackpool	Tony Benn	Harold Wilson		
1–5 October 1973	Blackpool	William Simpson	Harold Wilson		
27–30 November 1974	London	James Callaghan	Harold Wilson		
26 April 1975	London	Fred Mulley	Harold Wilson	Special Conference on the Common Market.	
29 September – October 1975	Blackpool	Fred Mulley	Harold Wilson		
27 September – 1 October 1976	Blackpool	Tom Bradley	James Callaghan		
3–7 October 1977	Brighton	Joan Lestor	James Callaghan		
2–6 October 1978	Blackpool	Joan Lestor	James Callaghan	Last conference with Labour in government for 19 years.	
1–5 October 1979	Brighton	Frank Allaun	James Callaghan		
29 September – 3 October 1980	Blackpool	Lena Jeger	James Callaghan		
24 January 1981	Wembley	Alec Kitson	Michael Foot	Special Conference to set up the electoral college for the election of party leader, Michael Foot.	
27 September – 2 October 1981	Brighton	Alec Kitson	Michael Foot	Denis Healey defeats Tony Benn in the deputy leadership election.	
27 September – 1 October 1982	Blackpool	Judith Hart	Michael Foot		
3–8 October 1983	Brighton	Sam McCluskie	Neil Kinnock		
1–5 October 1984	Blackpool	Eric Heffer	Neil Kinnock		
29 September – 4 October 1985	Bournemouth	Alan Hadden	Neil Kinnock	Kinnock rails against Militant-led Liverpool Council	
28 September – 3 October 1986	Blackpool	Neville Hough	Neil Kinnock		
27 September – 2 October 1987	Brighton	Syd Tierney	Neil Kinnock		
2–7 October 1988	Blackpool	Neil Kinnock	Neil Kinnock		
1–6 October 1989	Brighton	Dennis Skinner	Neil Kinnock		
30 September – 5 October 1990	Blackpool	Jo Richardson	Neil Kinnock		
29 September – 4 October 1991	Brighton	John Evans	Neil Kinnock		
27 September – 2 October 1992	Blackpool	Tony Clarke	John Smith		
26 September – 1 October 1993	Brighton	David Blunkett	John Smith	Trade union block vote replaced with one member, one vote.	
3–7 October 1994	Blackpool	David Blunkett	Tony Blair	"New Labour" rebranding officially unveiled.	
29 April 1995	London	Gordon Colling	Tony Blair	Special Conference on the Party Constitution.	
2–6 October 1995	Brighton	Gordon Colling	Tony Blair		
30 September – 4 October 1996	Blackpool	Diana Jeuda	Tony Blair		
29 September – 3 October 1997	Brighton	Robin Cook	Tony Blair	First conference after Labour's general election victory.	
28 September – 2 October 1998	Blackpool	Richard Rosser	Tony Blair		
27 September – 1 October 1999	Bournemouth	Brenda Etchells	Tony Blair		
24–28 September 2000	Brighton		Tony Blair		
30 September – 3 October 2001	Brighton		Tony Blair	Ended early due to parliament recall for updates on the September 11 attacks	
30 September – 3 October 2002	Blackpool		Tony Blair		
28 September – 2 October 2003	Bournemouth	Ian McCartney	Tony Blair		
26–30 September 2004	Brighton	Ian McCartney	Tony Blair		
26–29 September 2005	Brighton	Ian McCartney	Tony Blair		
24–28 September 2006	Manchester		Tony Blair		
23–27 September 2007	Bournemouth		Gordon Brown		
20–24 September 2008	Manchester		Gordon Brown		
27 September – 1 October 2009	Brighton		Gordon Brown		
26–30 September 2010	Manchester		Ed Miliband		
25–29 September 2011	Liverpool		Ed Miliband		
30 September – 4 October 2012	Manchester		Ed Miliband		
22–25 September 2013	Brighton		Ed Miliband		
1 March 2014	London		Ed Miliband	Special conference on party reform	
21–24 September 2014	Manchester		Ed Miliband		
12 September 2015	London		Jeremy Corbyn	Special conference for leadership elections	
27–30 September 2015	Brighton		Jeremy Corbyn		
25–28 September 2016	Liverpool		Jeremy Corbyn		
24–27 September 2017	Brighton		Jeremy Corbyn		
23–26 September 2018	Liverpool		Jeremy Corbyn		
21–25 September 2019	Brighton	Wendy Nichols	Jeremy Corbyn		
4 April 2020	London		Keir Starmer	Special conference for leadership elections	
19–22 September 2020	Online		Keir Starmer	Originally to be hosted in Liverpool. Took place online as "Labour Connected" due to COVID-19 pandemic	
25–29 September 2021	Brighton		Keir Starmer		
25–28 September 2022	Liverpool	Anneliese Dodds	Keir Starmer		
8–11 October 2023	Liverpool	Anneliese Dodds	Keir Starmer		
21–25 September 2024	Liverpool	Ellie Reeves	Keir Starmer	First conference after Labour's general election victory.	
28 September–1 October 2025	Liverpool	Anna Turley	Keir Starmer		
17 July 2026	London		Andy Burnham	Special conference for the leadership election	
27 – 30 September 2026	Liverpool		Andy Burnham		

== Conferences ==
=== Hugh Gaitskell leadership ===
==== 1957 Brighton ====
Aneurin Bevan made a speech disavowing unilateral nuclear disarmament, claiming that it would send the government "naked into the conference chamber".

=== Harold Wilson leadership ===
==== 1966 Brighton ====
Nicolas Walter shouted "hypocrite" at Wilson in protest against support given by the government to US behaviour in the Vietnam War. Walter was bundled out of the venue, arrested, charged with "indecency in church" under the 1860 Ecclesiastical Courts Jurisdiction Act because Wilson was speaking in a church, and imprisoned for two months.

=== James Callaghan leadership ===
==== 1976 Blackpool ====
Chancellor of the Exchequer Denis Healey announced his plans for a $3.9 billion loan from the IMF to tackle inflation, as well as continuing existing pay policies and public spending restraints.

=== Michael Foot leadership ===
==== September 1981 Brighton ====
There was a minute's silence at the Conference in memory of Bill Shankly, former Liverpool FC manager and lifelong Labour supporter. The deputy leadership election took place, with incumbent deputy Denis Healey narrowly defeating challenger Tony Benn.

=== Neil Kinnock leadership ===
==== 1983 Brighton ====
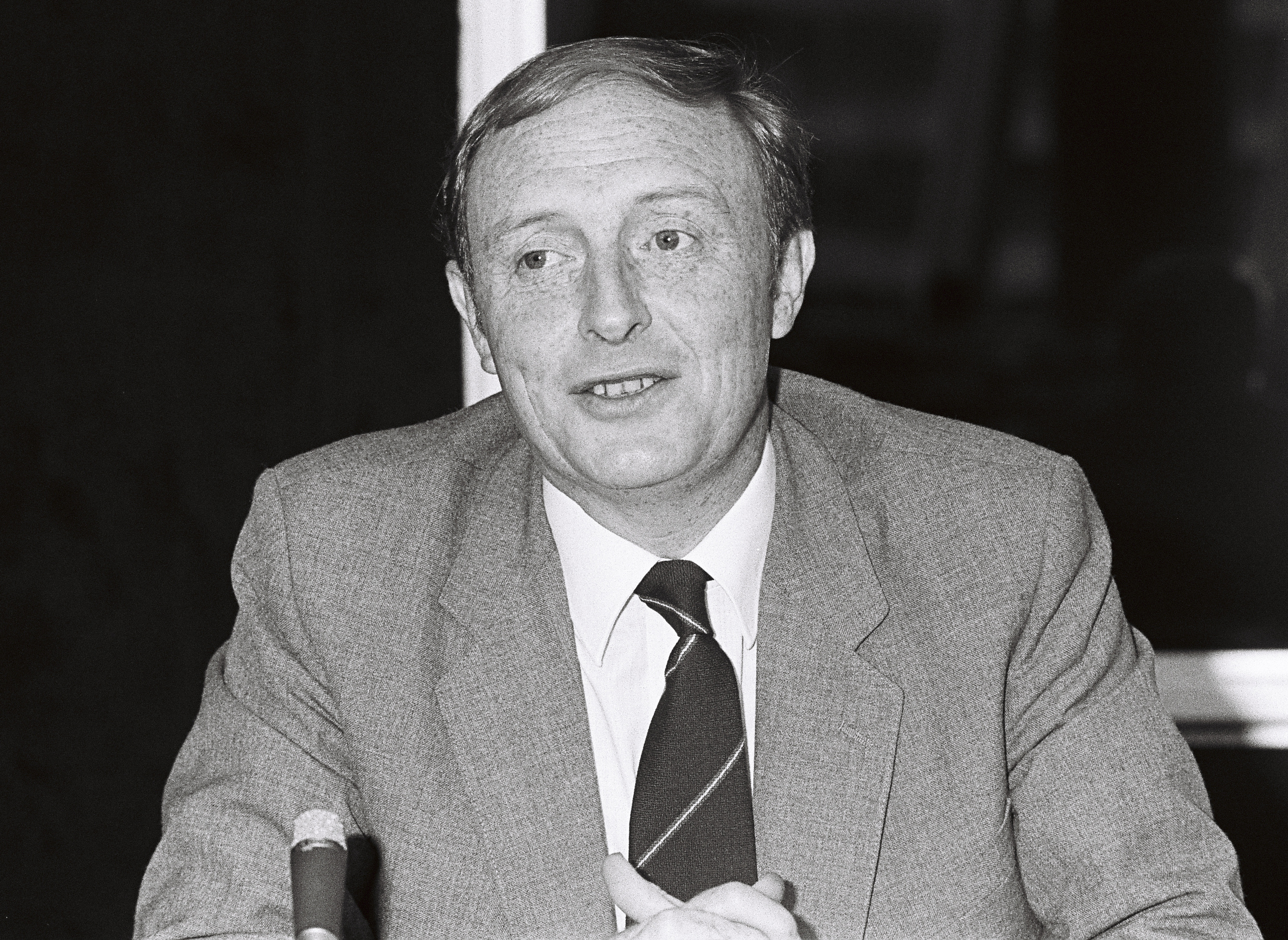
Neil Kinnock was the first Labour leader to be elected by the party's Electoral College. He led the party from 1983 to 1992

Neil Kinnock was elected party leader with 71% of the vote, following Labour's defeat in the June general election, succeeding Michael Foot. Roy Hattersley joined him as deputy leader. In his speech, Kinnock stated that "we can enjoy fraternity between socialists and we must enjoy fidelity to socialism." The editorial board of Militant were expelled.

==== 1985 Bournemouth ====
In his speech, Kinnock attacked Militant and their record in the leadership of Liverpool City Council, leading to a walkout led by Eric Heffer.

==== 1989 Brighton ====
The rules for the election of the Parliamentary Committee were changed, expanding it to 18 seats, at least three of which were to be filled by women.

=== John Smith leadership ===
==== 1992 Blackpool ====
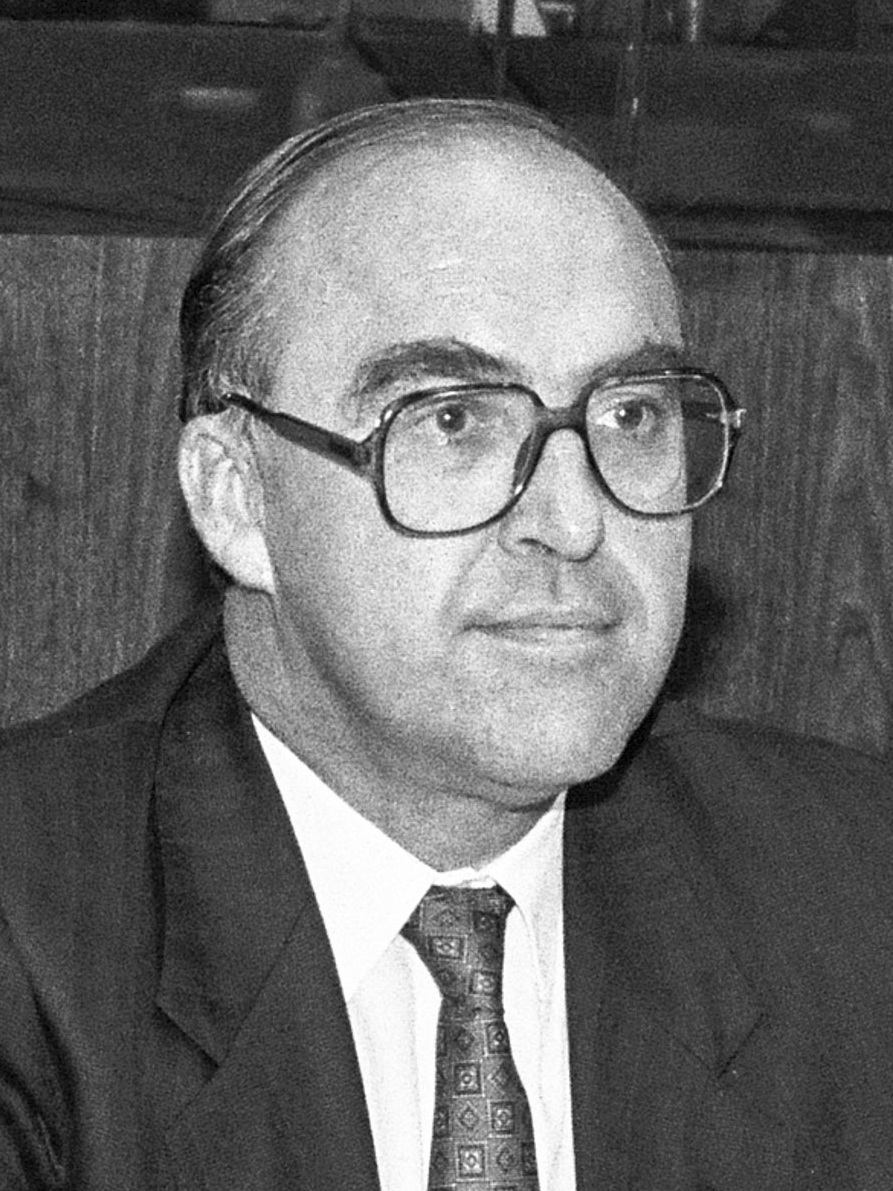
John Smith won the leadership of the party after its third consecutive General Election defeat. He led the party from 1992 until his death in 1994

In July 1992, John Smith succeeded Neil Kinnock, by winning the party's leadership contest with 91% of the vote, against his only remaining leadership opponent, Bryan Gould. Margaret Beckett was elected as the party's deputy leader. The contest followed Labour's defeat in the April general election.

==== 1993 Brighton ====
For 1993, the rules for the Parliamentary Committee were amended again so four of its seats were to be filled by women. Smith abolished the trade union block vote at Conference and replaced it with the one member, one vote method. He was praised by John Prescott for "putting his head on a block" in pushing the reforms through.

=== Tony Blair leadership ===
==== 1994 Blackpool ====
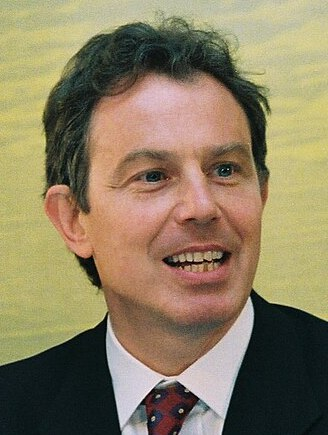
Tony Blair was elected Labour leader in 1994. He subsequently won three consecutive general elections, two of which were by a large majority of seats. He is Britain's longest-serving Labour Prime Minister, leaving office and the party leadership in 2007

Tony Blair won the 1994 Labour Leadership Contest, with 57% of the overall votes, following the death of the former leader, John Smith. His opponents were John Prescott and Margaret Beckett. Prescott was elected as the party's deputy leader.

The "New Labour" rebranding was officially unveiled.

==== October 1995 Brighton ====
Featured Blair's "Young Country" speech.

==== 1996 Blackpool ====
Featured Blair's "Education, Education and Education" speech.

==== 2000 Brighton ====
The 2000 conference was held in Brighton from 24 to 28 September.

On 25 September, John Prescott, Deputy Prime Minister, made a speech stating that Labour would "take the Tories to the cleaners" in the next election, and called William Hague a "drunk in charge of a bandwagon." On 27 September, delegates voted by a majority of nearly three-to-two in favour of a motion calling for the basic state pension to be linked to average earnings. Blair said that the government would not change its pension policies despite the vote. The international guest speaker was Nelson Mandela, the former President of South Africa. Closing the conference on 28 September, he made a speech condemning poverty and inequality and made an appeal concerning AIDS in South Africa.

==== 2001 Brighton ====
The 2001 conference took place in Brighton and began on 30 September. On 25 September, Blair had stated he would recall Parliament from the recess for a day in order to keep MPs updated following the September 11 attacks, meaning the conference was rescheduled to end a day earlier than initially planned, on 3 October. The event was protected by a large security operation, including a five-mile air exclusion zone. The international guest speaker was Gerhard Schröder, the Chancellor of Germany.

The conference began with a two-minute silence, an address from the Chief Fire Officers Association praising firefighters in New York, and a speech from culture secretary Tessa Jowell. Deputy Prime Minister John Prescott also gave a speech, with The Guardian noting that he "dropped his usual party conference knock-about routine."

Blair's speech on 2 October focused mostly upon the fallout of September 11 and plans for the war in Afghanistan, while also paying some focus to a potential referendum on the introduction of the Euro. It was praised by most U.S. newspapers, while European papers were less supportive; The New York Times stated that Blair was "America's most passionate and steadfast ally in the fight against terrorism," while Italian paper La Stampa said that "in some phases Blair has seemed to be tugging at Bush's jacket, so as to appear not so much the trusted friend but more the petulant friend, or even the irritating friend." Blair also spoke of an international "Partnership for Africa", giving the private sector a larger role in public services, and a potential review of student funding and tuition fees.

==== 2002 Blackpool ====
The 2002 event took place in the Winter Gardens complex in Blackpool, and ran from 30 September to 3 October. Attendees included: pressure groups such as the Countryside Alliance, League Against Cruel Sports, and Anti-Nazi League; big business such as BNFL, BP, and BAE Systems; think tanks including the Fabian Society, 50 people from the Institute for Public Policy Research, and the Adam Smith Institute; the Confederation of British Industry; various media organisations; and observers from other political parties including the Iraqi National Congress, though the Socialist Workers Party claimed they were not let in.

In Blair's speech on 1 October, he pledged to "quicken the march of progress" in reforming the UK's public services, and said that Labour was "best at its boldest - and so far we've made a good start, but we've not been bold enough." He told the trade unions to "work with us," and said that the welfare state had led to a "monolithic provision of services," arguing for the use of private finance. He argued for the possibility of war with Iraq, and reiterated that there would be a referendum on joining the euro if economic tests were met. It ended with a four minute standing ovation.

The international guest speaker was Bill Clinton, former President of the United States of America, who spoke in a 50 minute address on 2 October. He used the speech to tell both President George W. Bush and Labour to continue working with the United Nations to solve the Iraq disarmament crisis. The speech was followed by a 2.5 minute standing ovation.

==== 2003 Bournemouth ====
2003 was Blair's tenth conference as leader, held in Bournemouth from 28 September to 2 October. It was chaired by Ian McCartney.

On 28 September, Blair stated that he would continue pushing for foundation hospitals and university top-up fees, though a potential deal between the government and Unison concerning foundation hospitals, which was due to be announced in Blair's keynote speech, collapsed that night. Delegates initially voted to leave the Iraq War off the conference agenda entirely, instead staging emergency debates on the NHS, employment rights and pensions. On 29 September at a fringe event, former House of Commons leader Robin Cook made a speech criticising Blair's rejection of plans for a partly elected House of Lords. On 30 September, Gordon Brown was seen to put pressure on Blair in a speech, promising extra spending on public services, without directly attacking him. Culture secretary Tessa Jowell, announced plans to commemorate the 60th anniversary of the Normandy D-Day landings, and deputy prime minister John Prescott announced that 1,600 houses were to be built in the South East.

Blair also made his speech on the 30th, which received a record 7.5 minute standing ovation. During the speech, he listed Labour's achievements, dismissed a new top rate of income tax, stated that it "wouldn't be fair" if education funding came from the taxpayer, attacked those opposed to foundation hospitals, advocated pluralism in the public sector, and defended his decision to go to war in Iraq.

On 1 October, the National Union of Rail, Maritime and Transport Workers (RMT) attempted to force an emergency vote on the Iraq War onto the agenda which called "for the withdrawal of coalition troops", but this failed. The party leadership allowed a vote to go ahead concerning a section in a party policy document that recorded the Iraq War's chronology instead, with RMT stating that "the proposed vote will be meaningless". Blair's side won the Iraq vote, but lost two votes on foundation hospitals and the NHS among delegates. Over 86% of delegates also voted in favour of allowing people in Northern Ireland to become party members. The international guest speaker to address conference on the 1st was Hamid Karzai, the first President of the Islamic Republic of Afghanistan.

To end the conference on 2 October, Prescott told the party in a speech to stop "tearing ourselves apart," after unions forced ministers to accept a motion on compulsory employer pension contributions. The Red Flag was sung for the first time at the conference since 1999, alongside Jerusalem.

==== 2004 Brighton ====
The 2004 party conference was held in Brighton and ran from 26 to 30 September, again chaired by Ian McCartney. The conference rejected a call for withdrawal from Iraq, but accepted a resolution calling for renationalisation of the railways; the leadership declared that it would ignore this.

During his speech on 29 September, Blair was interrupted shortly after he started speaking by anti-war protester Hector Christie, who shouted "you've got blood on your hands," speaking of the Iraq War. Blair stated that the protester was lucky to be free to voice the protest. Around 15 to 20 minutes later, about six pro-hunting demonstrators shouted and set off rape alarms on the balcony above. All protesters were escorted away by police.

The conference was addressed on 30 September by the Irish rock star Bono who called for more action to combat the spread of AIDS and the debt problems African countries.

==== 2005 Brighton ====
The 2005 conference was held in Brighton from 26 until 29 September and followed Labour's success in the 2005 general election. Over the course of the conference, over 600 people were held under Section 44 of the Terrorism Act 2000, which allows for stop and search to be carried out by the police. This included Walter Wolfgang, an 82-year-old peace activist and refugee from Nazi Germany who was removed from the conference for shouting the word "nonsense" at a speech on Iraq by Jack Straw, and later detained under the Act when he tried to get back in. None of those held were arrested nor charged. Labour issued an apology to Wolfgang, and he was cheered when he returned the next day.

==== 2006 Manchester ====
In 2006 the conference was held in Manchester at the G-Mex and Manchester International Conference Centre from 24 to 28 September. It was the first time since 1974 that the main Labour conference was not held at a seaside town and the first time since 1917 the Labour conference had been held in Manchester. This followed Labour's Spring 2004 conference which was held at the G-Mex for the first time. The conference was Blair's last as leader after he stated this would be the case just before the conference and at the conference itself. The start of the conference was marked with protests against the Iraq War.

St Johns C.E. Primary School's steel band performed before Blair came on stage for his last speech to conference as party leader and prime minister. In the speech, he praised the work of the Chancellor of the Exchequer, Gordon Brown, though did not explicitly support him as a potential successor.

The conference was addressed in a joint session by Labour's Mayor of London, Ken Livingstone and the Mayor of Los Angeles Antonio Villaraigosa on the subject of climate change. Bob Geldof and Monica Naggaga from Oxfam (Uganda) spoke together about Africa. The main international guest speaker was the former US President Bill Clinton on 27 September. Another international visitor – but not a speaker to the conference – was Shimon Peres, the former Prime Minister of Israel.

=== Gordon Brown leadership ===
==== 2007 Bournemouth ====
The 2007 conference was held in the Bournemouth International Centre from 23 to 27 September. The conference was the first with Gordon Brown as leader of the Labour Party and Prime Minister, and he laid out his plans for his premiership. It was a first conference for Harriet Harman as Deputy Leader.

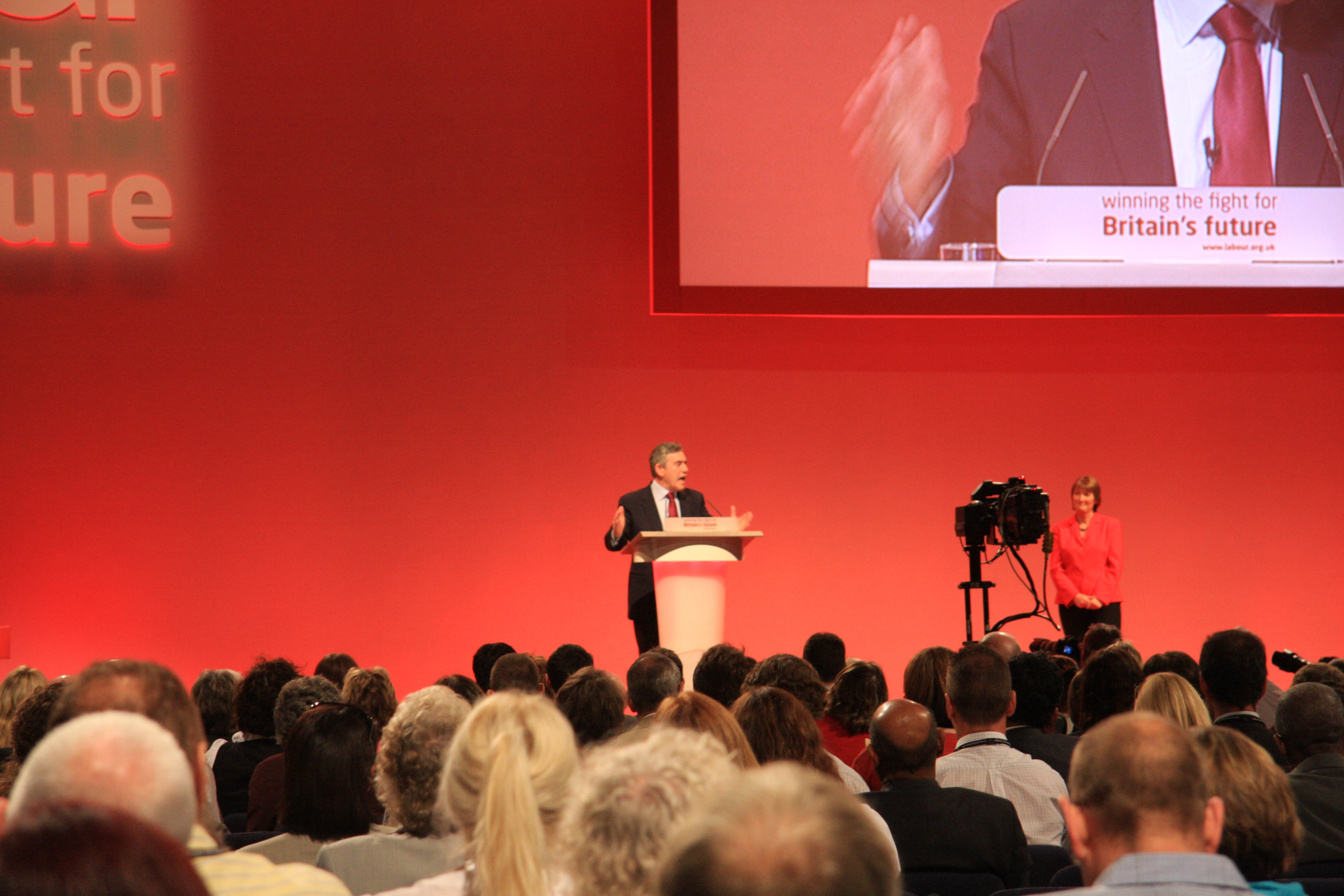
Gordon Brown speaks at the 2008 labour conference

==== 2008 Manchester ====
The 2008 conference was held between 20 and 24 September in Manchester at Manchester Central (formerly G-Mex). The opening day of conference was moved from Sunday to Saturday to allow people who work during the week to attend. The Labour leader and Prime Minister, Gordon Brown, delivered his keynote address on 23 September.

==== 2009 Brighton ====
The 2009 conference was held in Brighton from 27 September to 1 October 2009. It saw an address from Peter Mandelson, given on 28 September, in which he claimed that Labour was in "the fight of our lives" as the next general election approached. Gordon Brown gave his keynote address to the conference on the afternoon of 29 September, saying that Labour was "not done yet". Shortly afterwards, The Sun announced it would withdraw its support for Labour, and gave its backing to the Conservatives. Union leader and Labour supporter Tony Woodley responded by tearing up a copy of that edition of The Sun, telling the audience that "in Liverpool, we learnt a long time ago what to do. I suggest the rest of the country should do exactly the same thing", in reference to the hostility felt in Liverpool towards The Sun following its controversial allegations about the behaviour of Liverpool FC supporters in the Hillsborough disaster 20 years earlier.

=== Ed Miliband leadership ===
==== 2010 Manchester ====
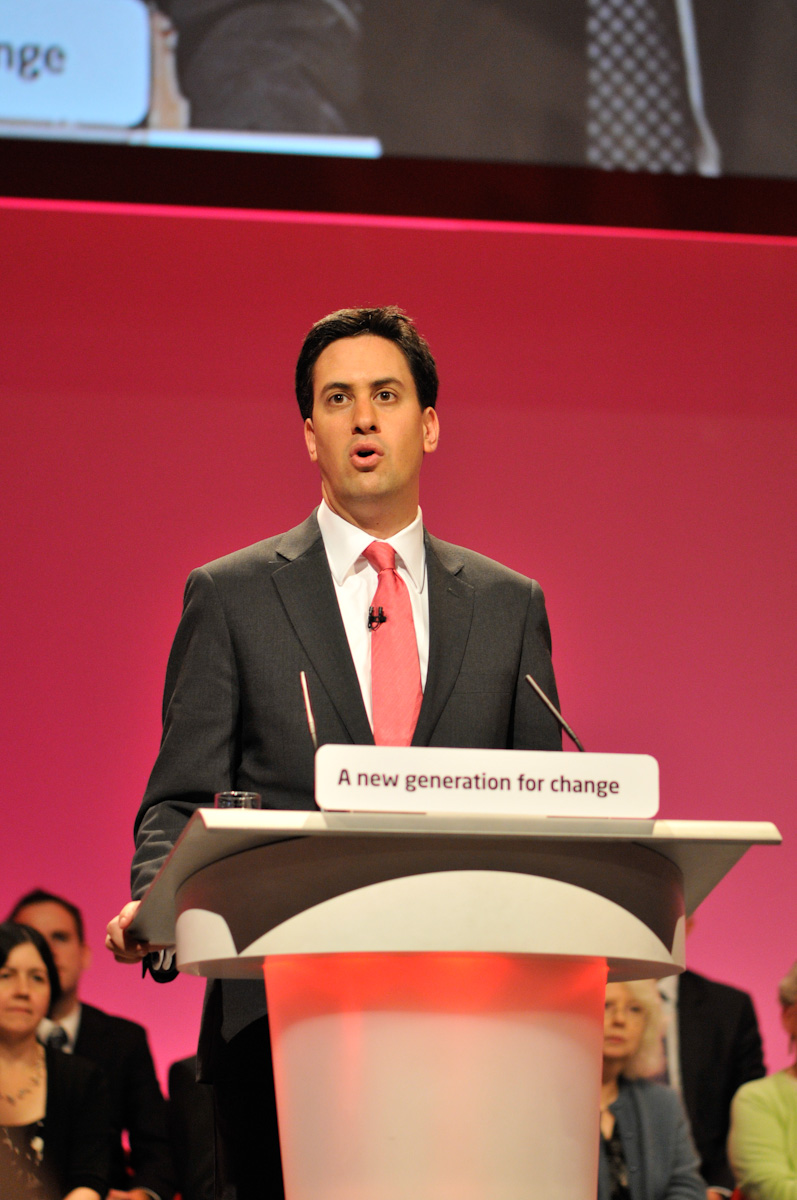
Ed Miliband gives his first keynote conference speech as leader of the Labour Party

Shortly after losing the 2010 general election to the Conservatives, following a Liberal Democrat coalition, the 2010 Conference took place at Manchester Central conference centre between 26 and 30 September. The conference started with the announcement of the results of the 2010 leadership election and was Ed Miliband's first conference as leader. In his first major speech as leader on 28 September, Miliband told delegates that his "new generation" would return the party to power. The following day David Miliband announced he would not be serving in his brother's shadow cabinet, although he would continue as an MP. Other highlights of the conference included activists condemning the coalition government's proposed public spending cuts as "obscene" on 27 September, and a close of conference address from Harriet Harman in which she told delegates that Ed Miliband would "fortify" the party.

==== 2011 Liverpool ====
The 2011 Conference took place in Liverpool from 25 to 29 September. It was the first time since 1925 that Labour had held its conference there. On 26 September delegates voted to scrap the tradition of Shadow Cabinet elections. Miliband's keynote speech on 27 September suffered a five-minute blackout after all media communications were lost.

==== 2012 Manchester ====
The 2012 Conference was held at Manchester Central conference centre, from 30 September to 4 October.

On 30 September, Miliband was interviewed on The Andrew Marr Show, with Marr particularly questioning his image, leadership appeal and popularity. Harvard professor Michael Sandel delivered a lecture to conference on predistribution as an economic goal, which Miliband had mentioned in his 2011 conference speech. He attended at least 30 fringe events on 1 October, including a Friends of Europe event with Eddie Izzard.

On 2 October, Miliband made his keynote speech themed around the new One Nation Labour branding. It was the first speech in around twenty years to be delivered by a Labour leader without the use of an autocue, enabling him to walk up and down the stage while maintaining audience eye contact, replicating the style of David Cameron's Conservative leadership bid in 2005. Miliband also made use of humour in approximately 20% of the speech, more than in his previous speeches. It received an overwhelmingly positive reaction from the press.

On 3 October, Miliband led a question and answer session for about 3,000 delegates and members.

==== 2013 Brighton ====
The 2013 Conference took place in Brighton from 22 to 25 September at the Brighton Centre.

==== 2014 London (Special Conference) ====
A special conference was held at ExCeL London on 1 March to approve rule changes arising from former general-secretary Ray Collins review of party reform. The changes included replacing the electoral college system for selecting new leaders with a "one member, one vote" system. Mass membership would be encouraged by allowing "registered supporters" to join at a low cost, as well as full membership. Members from the trade unions would also have to explicitly "opt in" rather than "opt out" of paying a political levy to Labour.

==== 2014 Manchester ====
The 2014 Conference was held in Manchester from 21 to 24 September at Manchester Central conference centre. Ed Miliband was criticised by his colleagues for not mentioning the deficit and immigration in his Conference address, despite having promised to do so in his pre-speech press release.

=== Jeremy Corbyn leadership ===
==== 2015 London (Special Conference) ====
The results of the leadership and deputy leadership elections were announced prior to the annual conference on 12 September at a short Special Conference in Westminster, London, in which Jeremy Corbyn was elected leader of the party.

==== 2015 Brighton ====
The 2015 conference took place in Brighton between 27 September and 30 September. Corbyn reinstated the use of the Autocue, three years after it had been abandoned by Miliband. It was the first time that Corbyn had used one to deliver a speech.

==== 2016 Liverpool ====
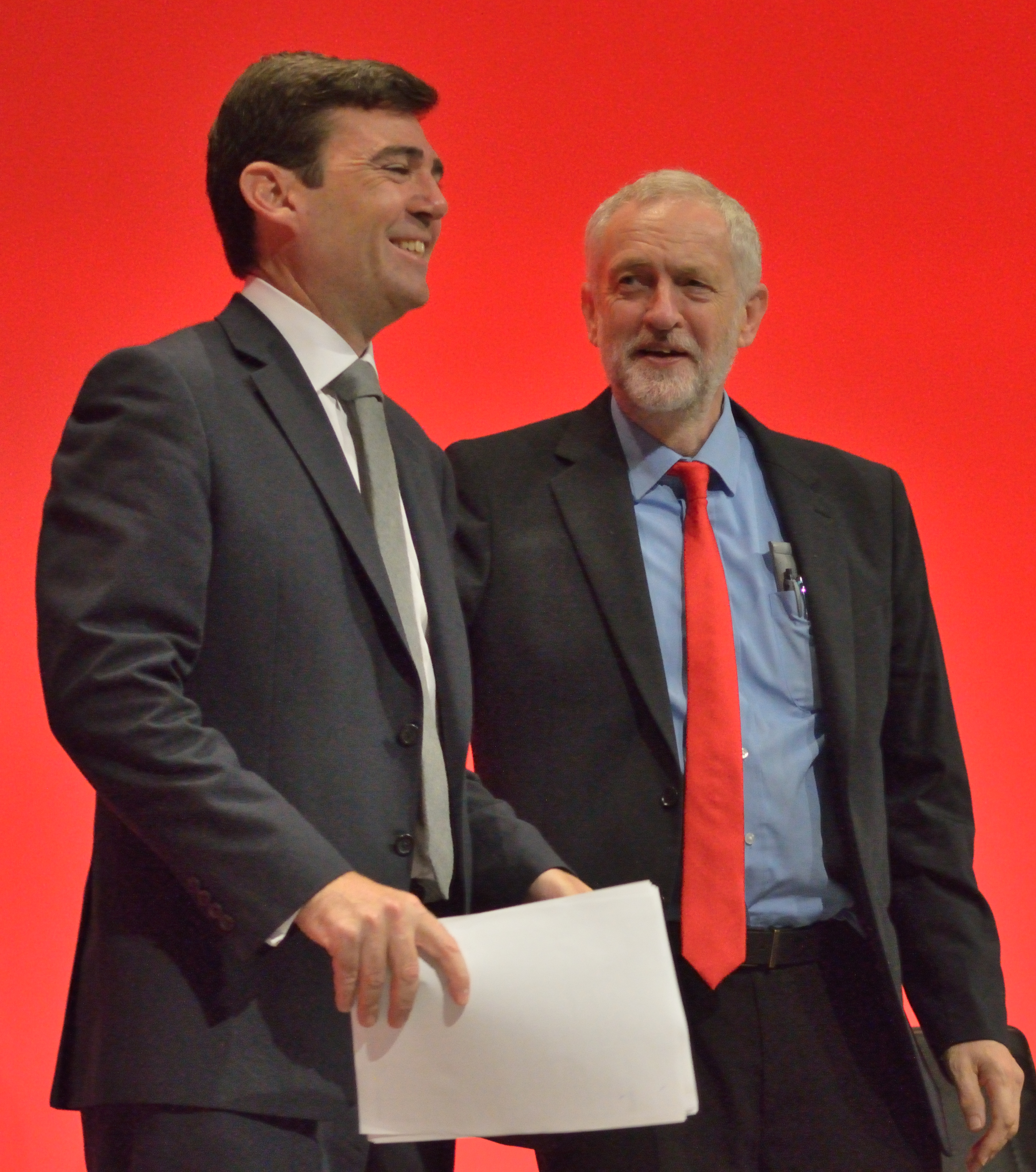
Andy Burnham (left), Shadow Home Secretary, and Jeremy Corbyn (right) re-elected as Leader of the Party at the 2016 Labour Party Conference

The 2016 Conference took place at ACC Liverpool; it started on 25 September and ran until Wednesday 28 September. The result of the 2016 leadership election was announced the previous day, with Jeremy Corbyn being re-elected. The conference heard impassioned pleas from Deputy Leader Tom Watson and Mayor of London Sadiq Khan for unity and a need for the party to gain power. Because of the second leadership election in two years and the divisive ideological discussions, there was concern about a fraught atmosphere at the conference. However, delegates and elected representatives came together in harmony on many issues, including opposition to plans for grammar school expansions, a 'hard Brexit' and on accepting more unaccompanied child refugees into Britain. Part of Corbyn's platform for the second leadership election was accepting the result of the EU referendum that year, though there were motions and debates on Europe and the prospect of a second referendum. The first year of The World Transformed, a festival hosted by the left-wing grassroots campaigning group Momentum, took place in the city at the same time as the conference.

==== 2017 Brighton ====
The 2017 Conference took place at the Brighton Centre in Brighton and had 13,000 attendees from Sunday 24 September to Wednesday 27 September 2017. The conference atmosphere was regarded as positive, following the relative successes of the party at the 2017 general election.

Labour deputy leader Tom Watson announced a number of policy plans concerning gambling, including forcing gambling companies to pay a levy to fund research, NHS treatment to help problem gamblers deal with their addiction, and banning football clubs from signing shirt sponsorship deals with betting companies. The conference cut the number of politicians from the program in order to let more regular party members to have slots. One example that received media attention was a speech by Lauren Stocks, a 16-year-old student from Greater Manchester. Commentators quickly drew parallels with William Hague's 1977 Conservative conference, which he delivered when he was also 16. Stocks spoke about the effects of recent changes to exams, and argued that:

There's a statistic we were shown when I was about 13 or 14 that told me 3 in 10 people in every classroom suffer with a mental illness. Now I'm going to be a bit frank here conference. That is bollocks! It's a good half ... I could've walked into any food tech, history, art, maths classroom and just watched seas of spaced-out, stressed-out, depressed kids, in a battlefield where they can't afford pens and paper! ... It is a disgusting sight and we cannot sit on our hands any longer!

Corbyn's keynote speech lasted 75 minutes and included a number of jokes at the expense both of the Conservatives and the Daily Mail. In terms of policy, Corbyn pledged that a Labour government would give cities the power to bring in rent controls and introduce restrictions on gentrification projects, citing the then recent Grenfell Tower fire.

Fringe events at the conference included the second year of The World Transformed, at which former party leader Ed Miliband hosted a political pub quiz, focusing on Labour history and current affairs. Centre for Cities, a think tank focused on cities in the UK, hosted a "the future of urban leadership" event, chaired by Andrew Carter with a panel consisting of Andy Burnham, Steve Rotheram, Michelle Dix (Managing Director of Crossrail 2), Francesca Gains (Head of Politics at University of Manchester) and David Orr (Chief Executive of the National Housing Federation).

==== 2018 Liverpool ====
The 2018 Conference took place at the Arena and Convention Centre Liverpool (ACC Liverpool) from 23 to 26 September, with 13,000 delegates at the event.

On 23 September, Angela Rayner announced a range of education reforms: that Labour would scrap the Free School program, democratise Academy schools, give local authorities the power to take control of badly performing Academies and remove the ability to shape their own admission policies. On 24 September, it was announced that private property tenants would be given more protections, as landlords couldn't evict them without reason. John McDonnell announced that workers in companies with more than 250 employees would become joint share holders in a structure that the law would oblige to adopt, with each employee receiving a payout at the end of each year.

The prospect of a second referendum on the UK's relationship with the European Union was a heavily discussed topic at the conference. Both Leader Jeremy Corbyn and Deputy Leader Tom Watson had said should the conference vote for a second referendum they would support it. The motion was discussed by delegates on the Sunday, including MPs and representatives from People's Vote and other delegates, and after five hours they had written a two-paged motion stating that "If we cannot get a general election Labour must support all options remaining on the table, including campaigning for a public vote". The vote on motion took place on the Tuesday.

Party delegates voted on the Member of Parliament reselection process. They lowered the threshold required of local branches and local union branches to express dissatisfaction in an MP's performance from 50% to 33%.

Fringe Events also took place at the conference included The World Transformed, at which 2017 French presidential candidate Jean-Luc Mélenchon was a key-note speaker, as well as Corbyn, Katja Kipping (leader of Die Linke), Ralf Stegner (SPD), Zitto Kabwe (leader of Alliance for Change and Transparency) and Ash Sarkar. Councils against Austerity also took place, organised by a group of 24 Labour council leaders and 12 local Labour group leaders who had signed an open letter sent to Prime Minister Theresa May, criticising austerity's effect on local government. Real Britain, an event hosted by The Mirror, was chaired by Kevin Maguire and had speakers such as John McDonnell, Len McCluskey and former footballer Neville Southall. At this event McCluskey stated Unite's interest in supporting Labour Party candidates in Northern Ireland, instead of the SDLP.

==== 2019 Brighton ====
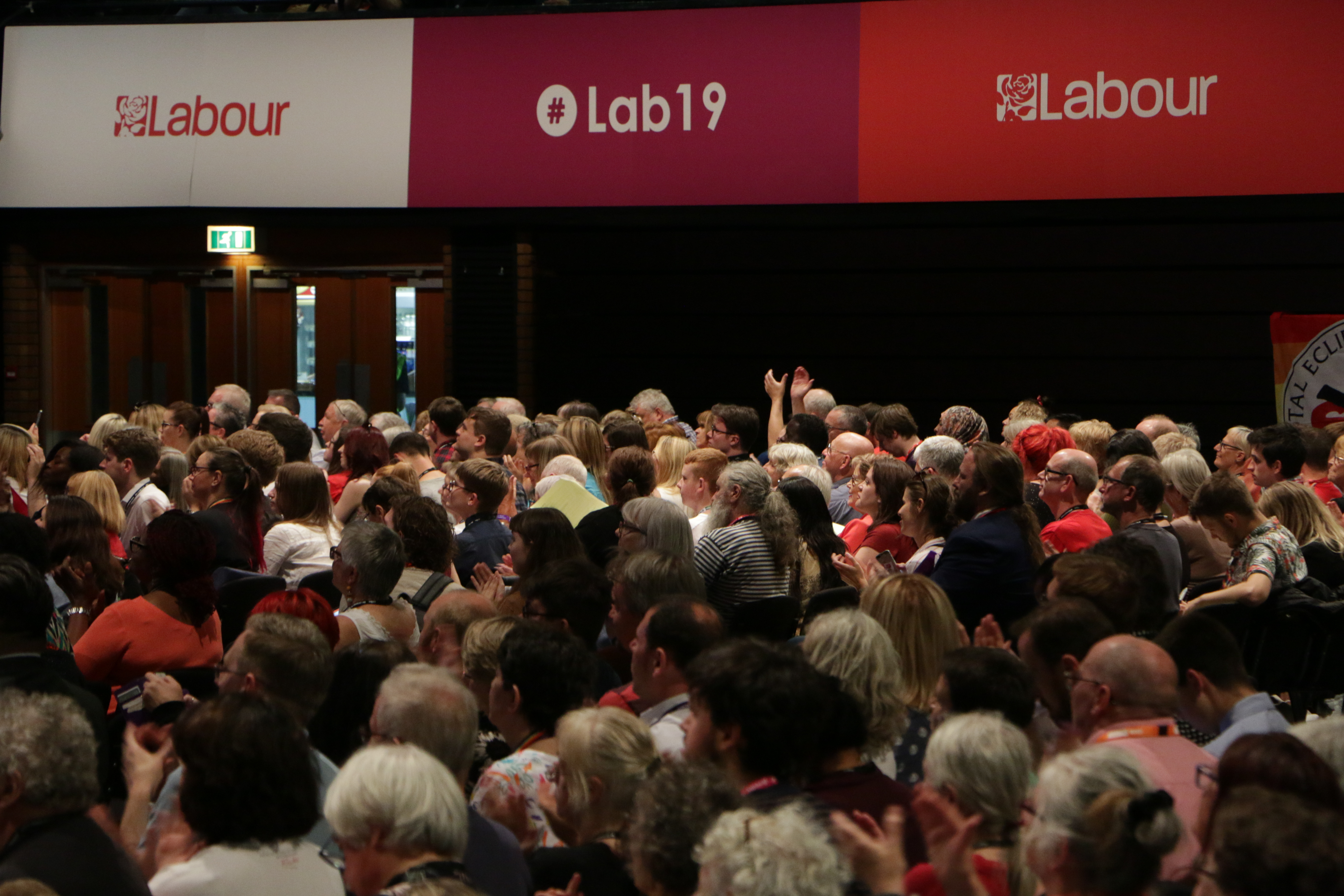
Audience at the 2019 Labour conference

The 2019 Conference took place at the Brighton Centre from 21 to 25 September, and was chaired by Wendy Nichols. Earlier in the year, there was talk of hosting a special conference on a resolution to the deadlock on whether Labour should back a second referendum on Britain's relationship with the European Union. However, in July 2019 Labour's affiliated trade unions agreed a joint position on Brexit, in which any finalised Brexit deal would be subject to a referendum, with the party to back a Remain vote if a Conservative government had negotiated the deal, and the party’s position to be decided if it was a Labour government's deal. Conference delegates voted on whether Labour should fully support remain in a second referendum, or support the leadership's position of hosting a special conference after securing a majority government of how to campaign in the referendum. A majority of delegates supported the leadership's position.

Conference delegates voted on and supported several policy motions, including: supporting a Green New Deal - which included large investments in windfarms and making the country carbon neutral by 2030, reducing working hours to 32-hour workweek within a decade, abolish private schools, free prescriptions in England, the creation of a National Care Service (a care-focused counterpart to the National Health Service), an extension of voting rights to all residents of the UK regardless of their citizenship, and a large expansion of mental healthcare services aimed at preventing adolescent suicide.

Jeremy Corbyn brought his speech forward by a day due to the Supreme Court ruling that the prorogation of Parliament by Prime Minister Boris Johnson was unlawful.

=== Keir Starmer leadership ===
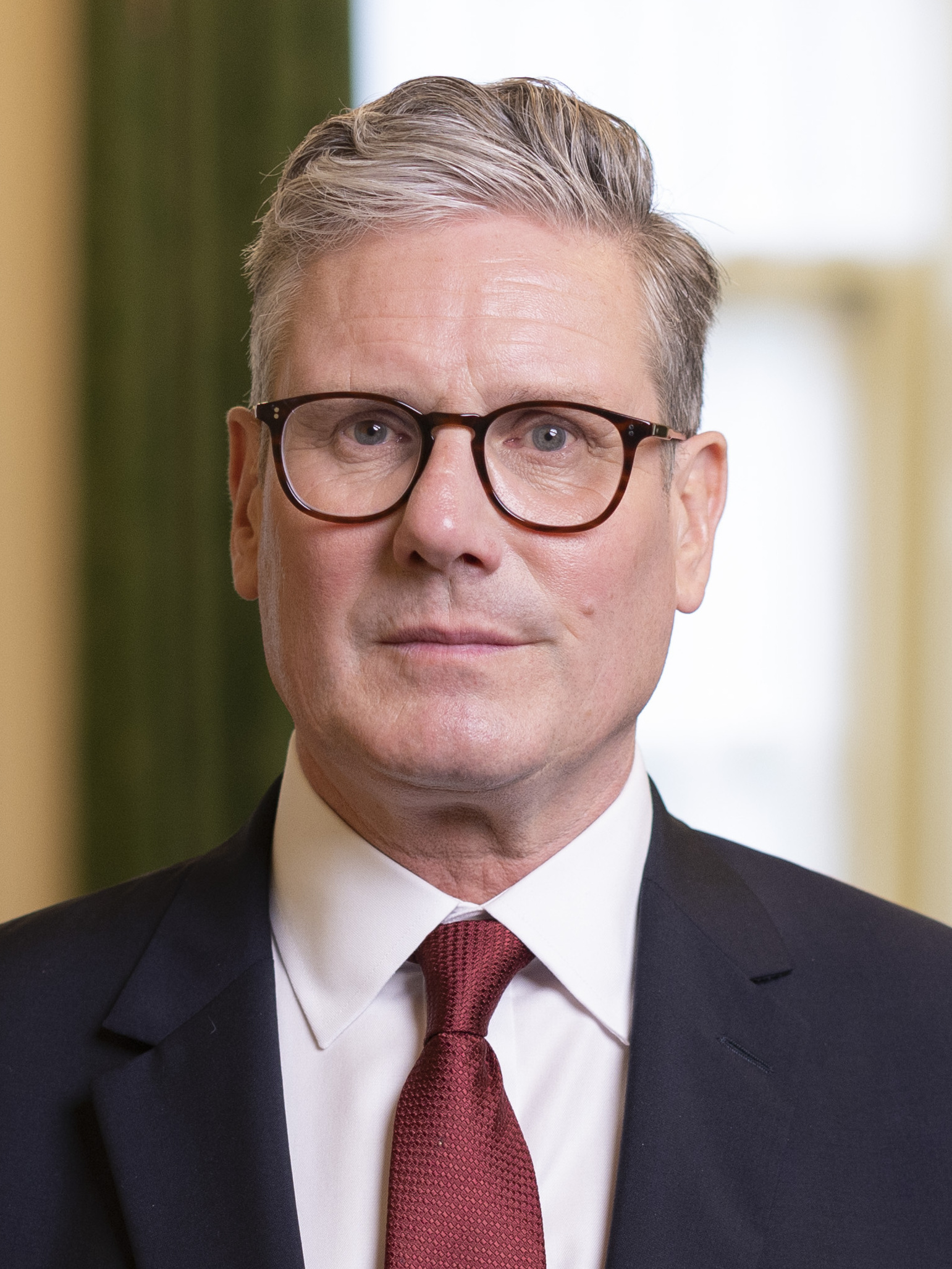
Keir Starmer was elected Labour leader in 2020. He subsequently won the 2024 general election, returning Labour to government

==== 2020 London (cancelled Special Conference) ====
On 4 April, a special conference was due to take place in London in order to announce the results of the leadership election, the deputy leadership election and by-elections for two membership election NEC positions, as well as a BAME (Black, Asian and Minority Ethnic) place on the National Executive Committee. The conference was cancelled due to the Coronavirus pandemic, and results were subsequently announced via the Labour Party social media feeds. Keir Starmer was announced as the 19th leader of the Labour Party.

==== 2020 Connected (Online Conference) ====
The 2020 Labour Party Conference would have taken place in Liverpool from Saturday 19 September to Wednesday 23 September, however it was moved to an online format due to the COVID-19 outbreak. It was Keir Starmer's first conference as leader. Taking place from 19 to 22 September, the virtual conference was renamed Labour Connected and described by the party as focused on "people coming together, to create a fairer and better society". Speakers included deputy leader Angela Rayner and Shadow Chancellor Anneliese Dodds.

Starmer's speech took place on 22 September, during which he criticised the government's handling of COVID-19, commenting that "just when the country needs leadership, we get serial incompetence". Starmer also focused on how Labour had changed since his election as party leader earlier that year, emphasising that the party was "under new leadership".

==== 2021 Brighton ====
The 2021 Labour Party conference took place between Saturday 25 September to Wednesday 29 September. It saw members attend in-person for the first time since the 2019 Conference.

Prior to the conference, motions were blocked by the Conference Arrangement Committee and party staff which were seen as too "broad". This included both the Labour for a 'Green Jobs Revolution' motion and the 'Build Back Fairer' motion, both backed by the party's left. Instead, less radical but similar motions were allowed to remain. The decision was quickly reversed after an appeal.

Controversy emerged due to Starmer wishing to change the voting system for leadership elections. He proposed reverting from a one member, one vote system, in which each Labour party member and supporter has an equal vote back to the electoral college where MPs, the membership and trade unions have a third of the vote each. The plan was accused of being anti-democratic, inappropriately timed and lacking consultation. Media speculated that this change in voting system was an attempt to continue an internal struggle with the left wing of the party, and to stop another left-wing candidate like Jeremy Corbyn from winning the election. Prior to the conference, the media reported opposition from Unite the Union, TSSA, CWU, and Momentum, and uncertainty from Unison, GMB and Usdaw.

Starmer gave up on the electoral college after it failed to gain the support of trade unions. However, the party's executive committee agreed to send a series of more modest reforms to conference, including increasing the percentage of Labour MPs a candidate would need the support of to get on the leadership election ballot, banning the party's newest members from voting, and making it harder for members to deselect MPs. These changes were later passed by a small margin.

At the conference party members voted in favour of a £15 an hour minimum wage. The motion calling for a £15 an hour minimum wage was put forward by the Unite union. Starmer and his leadership team did not indicate a preference either in favour or against the motion.

==== 2022 Liverpool ====
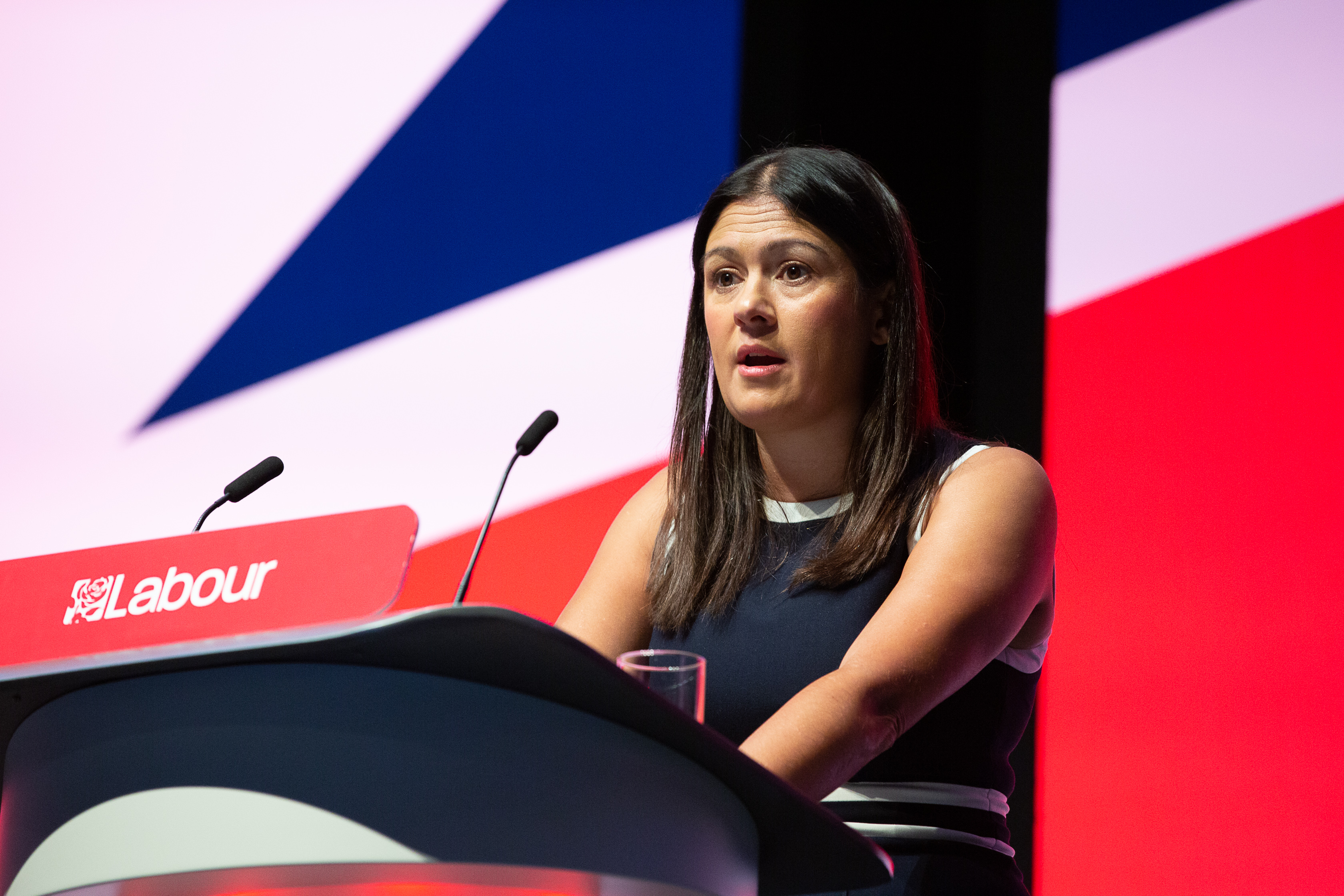
Lisa Nandy, Shadow Levelling Up Secretary, speaking at the 2022 conference, showing the strong Union Jack theming at the conference

The 2022 conference took place in Liverpool from Sunday 25 to Wednesday 28 September 2022 at ACC Liverpool, King's Dock, and was chaired by Anneliese Dodds.

To open the conference, Labour held a minute's silence following the death of Queen Elizabeth II, and sang God Save the King for the first time at a Labour conference. Former leader Jeremy Corbyn criticised the decision, stating that it was "very, very odd," and "excessively nationalist," arguing that there was no precedent for doing so.

Keir Starmer was introduced by Satvir Kaur. Delegates voted in favour of a motion on proportional representation, which is supported by major trade unions associated with the Labour Party, including Unite, Unison and the Communication Workers Union (CWU). However, Starmer said that electoral reform is not a priority and ruled out putting electoral reform in the Labour Party's next election manifesto.

==== 2023 Liverpool ====
Unusually, the 2023 conference took place in the same city as it did the previous year, Liverpool, from Sunday 8 October to Wednesday 11 October. It was also unusually held after the Conservative Party conference. The conference saw an increase in stalls from large companies, including for Google, Ineos, Specsavers, with fringe events sponsored by Deliveroo and Goldman Sachs. There was an increase in the number of "observers" sent by the Conservative Party to at least eight, up from the two usually sent between conferences at both parties.

Shadow Chancellor Rachel Reeves made her speech on 9 October, and spoke of a stance of "securonomics," which The Guardian stated was similar to U.S. President Joe Biden's language on economic nationalism. She announced the creation of a "Covid corruption commissioner", enforcement of the ministerial code on the use of private jets, and a fiscal lock on ministerial spending. Also on 9 October, Labour MP Apsana Begum left the conference due to safety concerns after she tweeted a photograph of herself supporting the Palestine Solidarity Campaign during the Gaza war.

Starmer gave his speech on 10 October, but was interrupted before he began when Yaz Ashmawi, a protester from the new campaign group People Demand Democracy, poured glitter over him, calling for a "people's house" and for proportional representation, which Starmer had rejected since the previous conference. During his speech, Starmer repeated the phrase "getting Britain building again," and repeated a pledge to build 1.5 million new houses. Starmer did not walk off the stage and through the crowd following his speech, as was usually the norm for party leader speeches at the conference. Labour sold limited edition "sparkle with Starmer" t-shirts for £20 following the incident, and the party launched a security review.

==== 2024 Liverpool ====
The 2024 Conference took place in Liverpool, on 22 September to 25 September for the third time in a row.

==== 2025 Liverpool ====
The 2025 Conference took place in Liverpool, from 28 September to 1 October.

=== Andy Burnham leadership ===
==== 2026 Liverpool ====
In December 2025, the Labour Party chose to ban transgender women from the 2026 Labour Women's Conference. Several major unions will boycott the 2026 Women's Conference because of the decision to ban transgender women. These unions boycotting and not sending a delegation to the 2026 Labour Women's Conference are Unison, Usdaw, ASLEF and the Musicians' Union.

== See also ==
- Conservative Party Conference
- Liberal Democrat Conference
- Party conference season
- Sheffield Rally, just before the 1992 general election
