= Collaborative bargaining =

Negotiation tactic

Collaborative bargaining is a style of negotiation which recognises the interests of the other party and emphasises cooperation between them. It was especially promoted, practised and studied in the negotiations between school districts and teaching unions in the United States in the 1990s. It is compared and contrasted with more adversarial models of collective bargaining in which the parties may regard each other as enemies.
