= Ken Jackson (trade unionist) =

British trade unionist (1937–2024)

Sir Kenneth Joseph Jackson (3 March 1937 – 25 July 2024) was a British trade unionist who was the General Secretary of the Amalgamated Engineering and Electrical Union (AEEU) from 1995 until that union's merger with the Manufacturing Science and Finance (MSF) union to form Amicus in 2001. He subsequently became one of the Joint General Secretaries (JGS) of Amicus.

== Life and career ==
Jackson was born and educated in Wigan, Lancashire. He joined the Royal Air Force in 1956 as an electrical technician, and continued in the same profession after re-entering civilian life. In 1966, he was elected as a Branch Secretary in the Electrical Trades Union, later the Electrical, Electronic, Telecommunications and Plumbing Union (EETPU). He became an executive councillor of EETPU in 1987 and its president in 1992. In 1995, following EETPU's incorporation into the AEEU, he became AEEU General Secretary.

Following the merger of AEEU and the Manufacturing, Science and Finance Union (MSF) to form Amicus, Jackson automatically assumed the role of Joint General Secretary of the AEEU Section of Amicus. This position came up for re-election in June 2002 and he was defeated by the then relatively unknown Derek Simpson, who went on to become Amicus General Secretary.

Throughout his career, Jackson was on the right wing of the union movement. He was a vice-president of the Trade Union Committee for European and Transatlantic Understanding (TUCETU), an organisation with close links to NATO. He became a close associate of Labour's then-prime minister Tony Blair, often being described as "Tony Blair's favourite trade unionist", and received a knighthood in 1999, an unusual honour for a trade union leader. His defeat in 2002 occurred at a time when the trade union movement was moving to the left: he found himself at odds with his counterparts in the movement due to his support of issues such as private-public partnerships and the American conduct of the war on terror. Six union officials had admitted to attempting to rig the election nominating process, but Jackson denied any involvement.

Jackson became chairman of Nirex, a company which formerly managed disposal of nuclear waste, in December 2001, while he was still a JGS of Amicus.

Jackson died on 25 July 2024, at the age of 87.

Trade union offices
Preceded by New position	President of the Amalgamated Engineering and Electrical Union; 1992–1994; With: Bill Jordan	Succeeded by Bill Jordan
Preceded by Paul Gallagher	General Secretary of the AEEU; 1995–2001	Succeeded by Position abolished
Preceded by New position	General Secretary of Amicus; 2001–2002 with Roger Lyons	Succeeded by Derek Simpson
