= Broad left =

Political coalition in the United Kingdom

Broad Left is a coalition of leftist members, usually involving independents, members of the Labour Party (UK) (although some people deny that the Labour Party still constitute as "broad left"), and members of organised revolutionary leftist movements within a trade union, or members of a political party that appeals to a wide range of leftist ideologies, such as Left Unity (UK).

== Sources ==
- J. David Edelstein, Malcolm Warner (1979). Comparative Union Democracy: Organisation and Opposition in British and American Unions. Transaction Publishers. p. 365. ISBN 0-87855-623-0.
- McIlroy, John (1 January 1995). Trade Unions in Britain Today (illustrated ed.). Manchester University Press. p. 175. ISBN 9780719039836.
